= 2010 Idaho elections =

- November 2, 2010
- Registered: 790,676
- Turnout: 57.9%

A general election was held in the U.S. state of Idaho on November 2, 2010. All of Idaho's executive offices were up for election, as well as a United States Senate seat and Idaho's two seats in the United States House of Representatives. Primary elections were held on May 25, 2010.

== Federal offices ==
=== United States Senate ===
One of the two United States Senators representing Idaho was up for election. Incumbent Republican Mike Crapo was re-elected to a third term with 71% of the votes.

United States Senate election in Idaho, 2010
Party	Candidate	Votes	%
Republican	Mike Crapo (incumbent)	319,953	71.2
Democratic	Tom Sullivan	112,057	24.9
Constitution	Randy Bergquist	17,429	3.9
Write-in		91	0.0
Total votes		449,530	100%

=== United States House of Representatives ===
Idaho has two representatives in the United States House of Representatives. While incumbent Republican Mike Simpson comfortably won re-election, Democrat Walt Minnick was seen as one of the most vulnerable incumbents heading into election day as he worked to build a moderate profile. Republican state representative Raúl Labrador won the Republican primary and eventually defeated Minnick, flipping his district.

United States House of Representatives elections in Idaho, 2010
Party	Votes	Percentage	Seats	+/–
Republican	263,699	58.97%	2	+1
Democratic	150,884	33.74%	0	-1
Independents	27,865	6.23%	0	—
Libertarian	4,696	1.05%	0	—
Totals	447,144	100.00%	2	—

== Governor ==
Incumbent Republican governor Butch Otter won re-election, defeating Democrat Keith Allred.

Idaho gubernatorial election, 2010
Party	Candidate	Votes	%
Republican	Butch Otter (incumbent)	267,483	59.1
Democratic	Keith Allred	148,680	32.9
Independent	Jana Kemp	26,655	5.9
Libertarian	Ted Dunlap	5,867	1.3
Independent	Pro-Life	3,850	0.8
Total votes		452,535	100%

== Lieutenant governor ==
2010 Idaho lieutenant gubernatorial election
- November 2, 2010
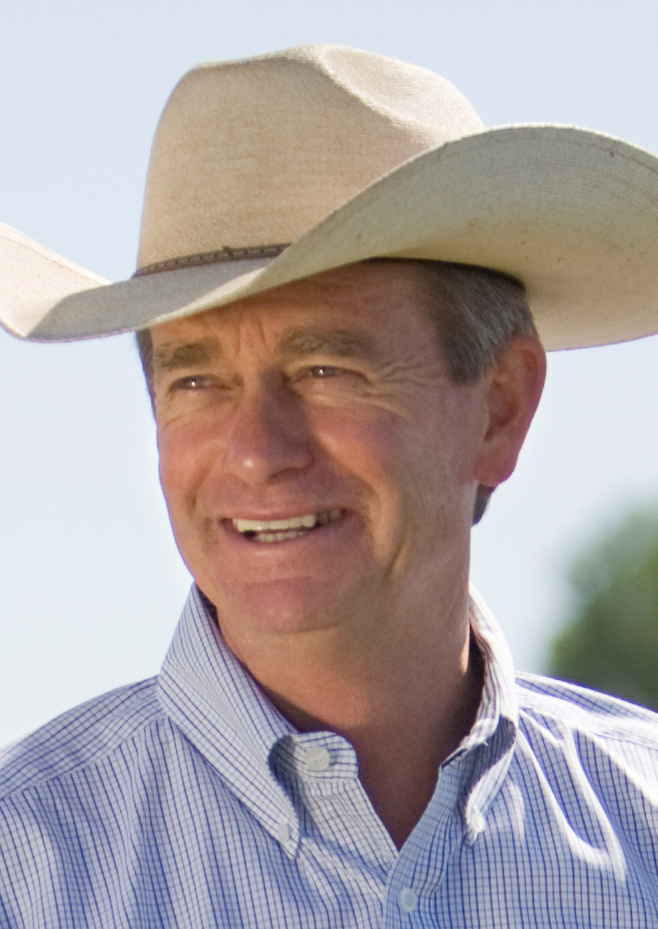

Nominee	Brad Little	Eldon Wallace
Party	Republican	Democratic
Popular vote	299,979	120,174
Percentage	67.8%	27.2%
- County results Little: 50–60% 60–70% 70–80% 80–90% Wallace: 50–60%
Lieutenant Governor before election
Brad Little
Republican
Elected Lieutenant Governor
Brad Little
Republican

Republican Brad Little was appointed to the office of lieutenant governor by Butch Otter in 2009 to fill the vacancy left by Jim Risch following his election to the United States Senate in 2008. Little ran for a full term and easily won both the Republican primary and then the general election, defeating Democrat Eldon Wallace.

=== Republican primary ===
==== Candidates ====
- Brad Little, incumbent.
- Joshua Blessinger, media director.
- Steven Dana Pankey

==== Primary results ====
Republican primary results
Party	Candidate	Votes	%
Republican	Brad Little (incumbent)	95,758	67.6
Republican	Joshua Blessinger	26,808	18.9
Republican	Steven Dana Pankey	19,096	13.5
Total votes		141,662	100%

=== Democratic Nominee ===
- Eldon Wallace

==== Primary results ====
Democratic primary results
Party	Candidate	Votes	%
Democratic	Eldon Wallace	23,960	100%
Total votes		23,960	100%

=== Third party candidates ===
- Paul Venable (Constitution Party)

=== General election ===
Idaho lieutenant gubernatorial election, 2010
Party	Candidate	Votes	%
Republican	Brad Little (incumbent)	299,979	67.8
Democratic	Eldon Wallace	120,174	27.2
Constitution	Paul Venable	22,007	5.0
Total votes		442,160	100%
Republican hold			

== Attorney general ==
Incumbent Republican attorney general Lawrence Wasden won re-election to a third term unopposed as no other candidate filed to run.

=== Republican Nominee ===
- Lawrence Wasden, incumbent.

==== Primary results ====
Republican primary results
Party	Candidate	Votes	%
Republican	Lawrence Wasden (incumbent)	134,842	100%
Total votes		134,842	100%

=== General election ===
Idaho Attorney General election, 2010
Party	Candidate	Votes	%
Republican	Lawrence Wasden (incumbent)	367,737	100%
Total votes		367,737	100%
Republican hold			

== Secretary of state ==
Incumbent Republican secretary of state Ben Ysursa won re-election to a third term with a landslide victory over Democrat Mack Sermon.

Idaho Secretary of State election, 2010
Party	Candidate	Votes	%
Republican	Ben Ysursa (incumbent)	326,453	74.3
Democratic	Mack Sermon	113,164	25.7
Total votes		439,617	100%

== Treasurer ==
Incumbent Republican state treasurer Ron Crane won re-election to a fourth term unopposed as no other candidate filed to run.

=== Republican Nominee ===
- Ron Crane, incumbent.

==== Primary results ====
Republican primary results
Party	Candidate	Votes	%
Republican	Ron Crane (incumbent)	132,919	100%
Total votes		132,919	100%

=== General election ===
Idaho State Treasurer election, 2010
Party	Candidate	Votes	%
Republican	Ron Crane (incumbent)	367,260	100%
Total votes		367,260	100%
Republican hold			

== Controller ==
2010 Idaho state controller election
- November 2, 2010
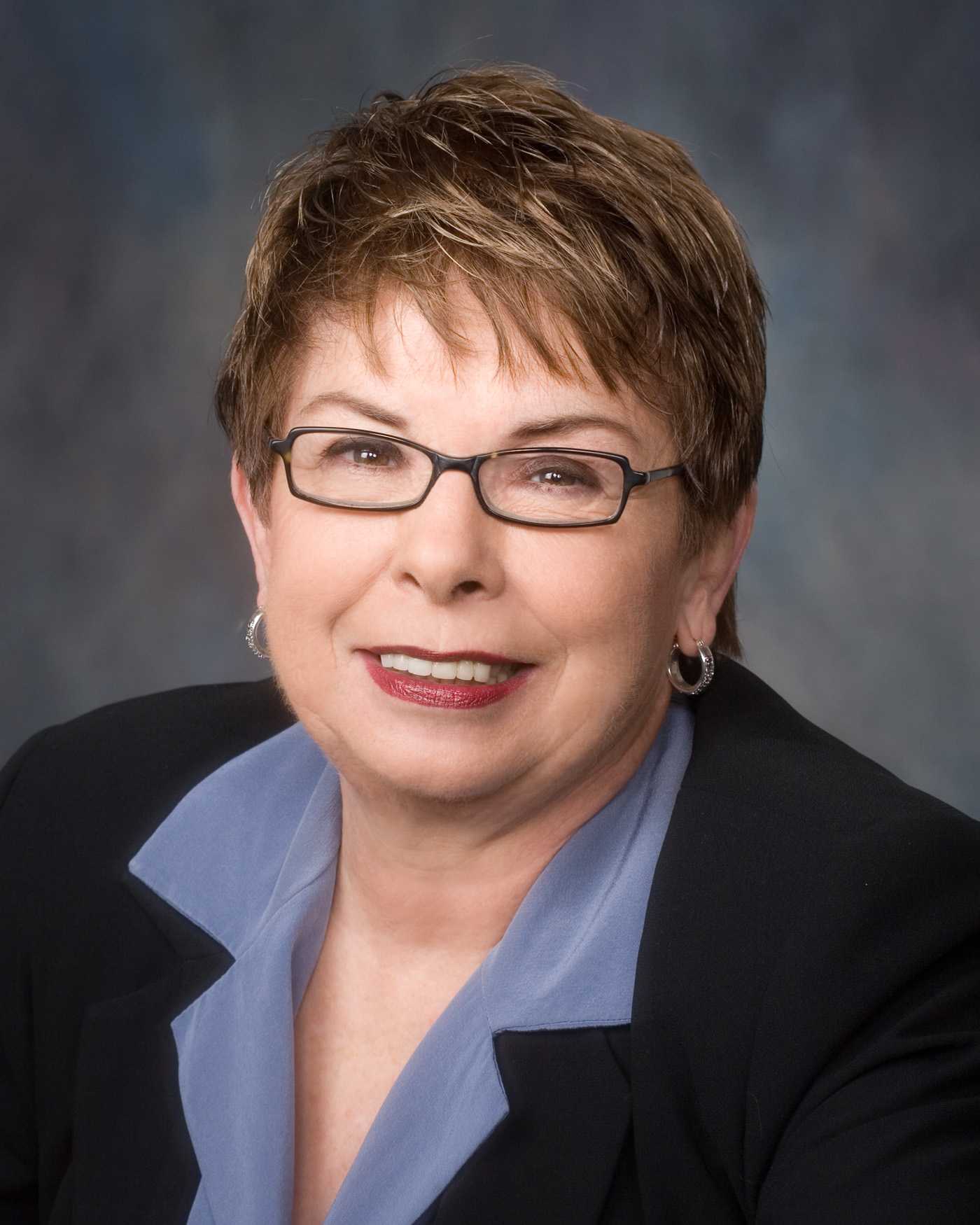

Nominee	Donna Jones	Bruce Robinett
Party	Republican	Democratic
Popular vote	308,207	125,571
Percentage	71.1%	28.9%
- County results Jones: 50–60% 60–70% 70–80% 80–90% Robinett: 50–60%
Controller before election
Donna Jones
Republican
Elected Controller
Donna Jones
Republican

Incumbent Republican state controller Donna Jones won re-election to a second term, defeating Democrat Bruce Robinett.

=== Republican Primary ===
==== Candidates ====
- Donna Jones, incumbent.
- Todd Hatfield

==== Primary results ====
Republican primary results
Party	Candidate	Votes	%
Republican	Donna Jones (incumbent)	80,569	56.4
Republican	Todd Hatfield	62,206	43.6
Total votes		142,775	100%

=== Democratic Nominee ===
- Bruce Robinett, finance manager.

Democratic primary results
Party	Candidate	Votes	%
Democratic	Bruce Robinett	23,721	100
Total votes		23,721	100%

=== General election ===
Idaho State Controller election, 2010
Party	Candidate	Votes	%
Republican	Donna Jones (incumbent)	308,207	71.1
Democratic	Bruce Robinett	125,571	28.9
Total votes		433,778	100%
Republican hold			

== Superintendent of Public Instruction ==
2010 Idaho superintendent of public instruction election
- November 2, 2010

Nominee	Tom Luna	Bruce Robinett
Party	Republican	Democratic
Popular vote	270,081	176,098
Percentage	60.5%	39.5%
- County results Luna: 50–60% 60–70% 70–80% Olson: 50–60%
Superintendent before election
Tom Luna
Republican
Elected Superintendent
Tom Luna
Republican

Incumbent Republican superintendent Tom Luna won re-election to a second term, defeating Democrat Stan Olson.

=== Republican Nominee ===
- Tom Luna, incumbent.

==== Primary results ====
Republican primary results
Party	Candidate	Votes	%
Republican	Tom Luna (incumbent)	126,659	100
Total votes		126,659	100%

=== Democratic Nominee ===
- Stan Olson, educator.

==== Primary results ====
Democratic primary results
Party	Candidate	Votes	%
Democratic	Stan Olson	24,152	100
Total votes		24,152	100%

=== General election ===
Idaho Superintendent of Public Instruction election, 2010
Party	Candidate	Votes	%
Republican	Tom Luna (incumbent)	270,081	60.5
Democratic	Stan Olson	176,098	39.5
Total votes		446,179	100%
Republican hold			

== State legislature ==
All 35 seats of the Idaho Senate and 70 seats of the Idaho House of Representatives were up for election.

=== Idaho Senate ===
Party	Before	After	Change
Republican	28	28	Steady
Democratic	7	7	Steady
Total	35	35	

=== Idaho House of Representatives ===
Party	Before	After	Change
Republican	52	57	▲5
Democratic	18	13	▼5
Total	70	70	

== Judicial seats ==
=== Supreme Court ===
Two incumbent justices on the Idaho Supreme Court sought re-election.

Justice Jim Jones who has been serving since 2005 ran unopposed and won another term. However, justice Roger Burdick faced a challenger in his bid for re-election.

==== Burdick's seat ====
2010 Idaho Supreme Court Justice election
- May 25, 2010

Nominee	Roger Burdick	John Bradbury
Party	Nonpartisan	Nonpartisan
Popular vote	99,788	71,160
Percentage	58.4%	41.6%
- County results Burdick: 50–60% 60–70% 70–80% 80–90% Bradbury: 50–60% 60–70% 70–80%
Justice before election
Roger Burdick
Nonpartisan
Elected Justice
Roger Burdick
Nonpartisan

Burdick was challenged by John Bradbury, a district judge from Idaho's second judicial district.

===== Candidates =====
- Roger Burdick, incumbent.
- John Bradbury, district judge.

===== Results =====
2010 Idaho Supreme Court election
Party	Candidate	Votes	%
Nonpartisan	Roger Burdick (incumbent)	99,788	58.4
Nonpartisan	John Bradbury	71,160	41.6
Total votes		170,948	100%

=== Court of Appeals ===
Incumbent Idaho Court of Appeals judge Karen Lansing ran unopposed and secured another term.

== Ballot measures ==
Four statewide ballot measures appeared on the ballot.

2012 Idaho ballot measures
Name	Description	Votes				Type
Name	Description	Yes	%	No	%	Type
SJR 101	Imposes rates of tuition and fees on students in the University of Idaho.	279,317	64.06	156,681	35.94	Legislatively referred constitutional amendment
HJR 4	Allows public medical facilities to enter debt to upgrade facilities.	276,255	63.48	158,921	36.52	Legislatively referred constitutional amendment
HJR 5	Allows airports to issue revenue and special facility bonds.	227,492	53.36	198,868	46.64	Legislatively referred constitutional amendment
HJR 7	Allows cities to reserve bonds in order to increase power capacity.	241,266	57.00	182,014	43.00	Legislatively referred constitutional amendment

Results by county

SJR 101 results by county
Yes:
- 50–60%
- 60–70%
- 70–80%
No:
- 50–60%

HJR 4 results by county
Yes:
- 50–60%
- 60–70%
- 70–80%
No:
- 50–60%

HJR 5 results by county
Yes:
- 50–60%
- 60–70%
No:
- 50–60%
- 60–70%

HJR 7 results by county
Yes:
- 50–60%
- 60–70%
- 70–80%
No:
- 50–60%

== See also ==
- Elections in Idaho
- Political party strength in Idaho
