= John Stegner =

American judge (born 1953)

Justice of the Idaho Supreme Court
- In office May 22, 2018 – October 31, 2023
- Appointed by: Butch Otter
- Preceded by: Warren Jones
- Succeeded by: Cynthia Meyer

Personal details
- Born: November 8, 1953 (age 72) Grangeville, Idaho, U.S.
- Party: Republican (before 2026); Independent (2026–present)
- Spouse: Laurie Stegner
- Children: 3
- Relatives: Joe Stegner (brother)
- Education: Whitman College (BA); University of Idaho (JD)
- Website: Campaign website

John R. Stegner (born November 8, 1953) is an American attorney and a former justice of the Idaho Supreme Court, having served from 2018 to 2023. He was previously a state district court judge for over two decades.

== Early life and education ==
Born and raised in Grangeville, Idaho, Stegner is the youngest of four sons of Charles and June Stegner. He earned his Bachelor of Arts degree in 1977 from Whitman College and his Juris Doctor from the University of Idaho College of Law in 1982.

== Career ==
Stegner was in private practice in Lewiston for twelve years with Clements, Brown & McNichols. He clerked for the late U.S. District Judge Harold L. Ryan for two years and worked for the family business, Stegner Grain & Seed Co.

=== State judicial service ===
Stegner was previously a judge of the state's second judicial district, based in Moscow. Appointed by Phil Batt to succeed John Judge in November 1996, he served on the court from 1997 to 2018.

=== Idaho Supreme Court ===
In 2017, Stegner was considered for a vacancy on the state supreme court created by the retirement of Dan Eismann, but Governor Butch Otter appointed Richard Bevan in late August. Another vacancy soon arose with the sudden retirement of Warren Jones, and Otter appointed Stegner on May 22, 2018. He was selected from among four finalists named by the Idaho Judicial Council after public interviews with 14 applicants, including six sitting judges. Stegner was the only justice on the state's highest court from northern Idaho, and the first in several decades. He ran unopposed in the 2020 election, held during the state primary in the spring.

In May 2023, Stenger sent a letter to Governor Brad Little, announcing his upcoming retirement from the court on October 31 and his return to private practice.

== Politics ==
Although a Republican for much of his life, in early 2026 Stegner announced that he was to contest the 2026 Idaho gubernatorial election as an independent.

Legal offices
Preceded by Warren Jones	Justice of the Idaho Supreme Court; 2018–2023	Succeeded by Cynthia Meyer
