= G. Richard Bevan =

American judge (born 1959)

Richard Bevan

Chief Justice of the Idaho Supreme Court
- In office January 1, 2021 – October 1, 2026
- Preceded by: Roger S. Burdick
- Succeeded by: Robyn Brody

Justice of the Idaho Supreme Court
- In office September 27, 2017 – October 30, 2026
- Appointed by: Butch Otter
- Preceded by: Daniel T. Eismann
- Succeeded by: Jason Scott

Personal details
- Born: George Richard Bevan; May 5, 1959 (age 67) Twin Falls, Idaho, U.S.
- Education: Brigham Young University (BS, JD)

George Richard Bevan (born May 5, 1959) is an American attorney and jurist who served as a justice the of the Idaho Supreme Court from 2017 to 2026 and as the court's chief justice from 2021 to 2026. He previously served as an Idaho district court judge from 2003 until 2017, when he was appointed to the supreme court.

== Early life and education ==
Born and raised in Twin Falls, Idaho, Bevan graduated from Twin Falls High School in 1977, and then attended Brigham Young University in Provo, Utah. He earned a Bachelor of Science in business management and finance in 1984, and completed a Juris Doctor at the J. Reuben Clark Law School in 1987.

== Career ==
Bevan served as the Twin Falls County prosecuting attorney from 1993 to 1997 as a Republican. He was a partner in the law firm Hillifield & Bevan from 1997 to 2003.

=== Idaho District Court ===
In 2003, Governor Dirk Kempthorne appointed Bevan as a state judge on the Idaho District Court for the 5th judicial district, which covers the south central portion of the state. He was re-elected in 2006, 2010, and 2014.

Bevan was considered by Idaho's Senators Mike Crapo and Jim Risch for a possible nomination as a federal judge, but David Nye was selected in 2016.

=== Idaho Supreme Court ===
In April 2017, Idaho Supreme Court justice Dan Eismann announced that he would retire on August 31. The Idaho Judicial Council provided Governor Butch Otter with four replacement candidates to choose from: Bevan, then-state district judges John Stegner and Greg Moeller, and attorney Rebecca Rainey. Otter announced on August 29 that he had selected Bevan for the vacancy. Later, both Stegner and Moeller joined Bevan on the Court.

Bevan was sworn in as a justice of the supreme court on September 27, 2017. Unopposed in the 2018 election, his current term expires in January 2025; the nonpartisan election is held within the statewide primary election in May. Through a vote of his peers on the supreme court, he was elected chief justice in November 2020 and began serving in that capacity on January 1, 2021. His term as chief justice ended on October 1, 2026, and he retired from the court on October 30, 2026.

Legal offices
Preceded by Daniel T. Eismann	Justice of the Idaho Supreme Court; 2017–2026	Succeeded by Jason Scott
Preceded by Roger S. Burdick	Chief Justice of the Idaho Supreme Court; 2021–2026	Succeeded by Robyn Brody
