= Concordia University (Oregon) =

Defunct private university in Portland, Oregon, U.S.

- Concordia University Portland logo
- Motto: Christi Crux Est Mihi Lux
- Motto in English: The Cross of Christ Is Light to Me
- Type: Private
- Active: 1905–2020
- Religious affiliation: Lutheran Church – Missouri Synod
- Endowment: $7.2 million (2009)
- Students: 5,342 (2019)
- Undergraduates: 1,501 (2019)
- Location: Portland, Oregon, U.S. 45°34.097′N 122°38.218′W
- Campus: Urban, 13 acres (5.3 ha)
- Colors: Navy & white
- Nickname: Cavaliers
- Sporting affiliations: NCAA Division ll
- Website: www.cu-portland.edu

Concordia University was a private Lutheran Church – Missouri Synod (LCMS) university in Portland, Oregon, that closed in spring 2020. One remaining program, the accelerated bachelor's degree in nursing, continues to operate under another Concordia University System school.

Opened in 1905 as a university-preparatory school, the institution added college classes in 1950 and the high school formally split from the college in 1977. The school of approximately 5,400 undergraduate and graduate students was affiliated with the LCMS and the Concordia University System. Located in northeast Portland, the school had branch campuses across Oregon and operated the Concordia University School of Law in Boise, Idaho. The university had four colleges and eighteen majors. Its athletic teams, known as the Cavaliers, competed in NCAA's Great Northwest Athletic Conference at the Division II level.

The university closed most of its schools after the completion of the spring 2020 semester when its parent, the LCMS, withdrew major financial support. Concordia University of St. Paul, Minnesota, now operates the School of Nursing and offers a program with an accelerated bachelor's degree.

In June 2022, the University of Oregon finalized its purchase of the campus. The university announced the campus would be known as UO Portland and house The Ballmer Institute for Children’s Behavioral Health.

== History ==
Concordia Academy was founded in 1905 by a growing Lutheran community in the Pacific Northwest to meet the need for pastors and parochial school teachers. The school added a junior college by 1950 and women were first admitted to then Concordia High School in 1962. Concordia became accredited by the Northwest Association of Schools and Colleges in 1968.

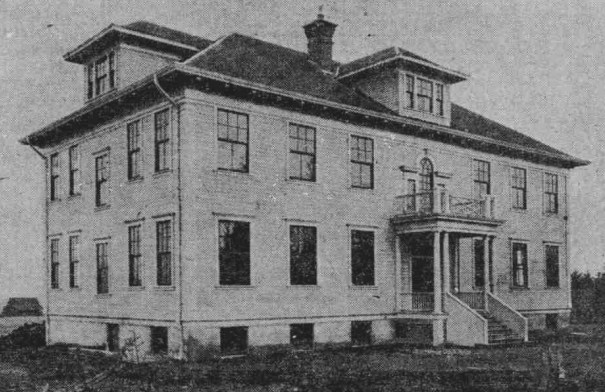
Concordia Academy, circa 1907

In 1977, an association of local Lutheran churches, the Portland Lutheran Association for Christian Education, assumed ownership and management of the high school as Portland Lutheran High School. At that time, Concordia separated from the high school and became a four-year institution, graduating its first baccalaureate students in 1980. Concordia College became Concordia University in 1995 and converted to the semester calendar. The next year the school added master's degrees in teaching and education, followed by a Master of Business Administration program in 2001. In 2002, the master's degree in education became Concordia's first program to also be fully online.

The university added a bachelor's degree in nursing in 2005 and then started the College of Health and Human Services in 2007. The nursing program was the first new such program in the state in 40 years. In 2009, Concordia started a program for conferring a bachelor's degree in music. By 2012, enrollment at the private school was about 3,100, almost doubling its enrollment over the past five years.

In the early 2010s, the enrollment in the university's online programs, particularly its Master of Education, grew rapidly. In the fall of 2009, the university enrolled approximately 1,100 undergraduate and 800 graduate students; five years later, the university enrolled approximately 1,300 undergraduate and 5,400 graduate students. In 2016, The Oregonian reported that Concordia University awarded "more Master of Education degrees than any other public or private nonprofit school in the country". The university expanded its online programs through an agreement with HotChalk, a private contractor. The university's $160 million deal with HotChalk drew scrutiny, including a two-year investigation by the U.S. Department of Education and a federal lawsuit that was settled for $1 million.

The Concordia University School of Law was located in Boise, Idaho, and graduated its first class of students in August 2015. Former Idaho Supreme Court Justice Cathy Silak was the dean of the law school.

In February 2020, Concordia University's parent entity, the Lutheran Church – Missouri Synod, decided not to provide continued financial support, and the university announced its plan to close after the completion of the spring 2020 semester, with a shut down as of April 25. The university's board of trustees voted to close the university "after years of mounting financial challenges, and a challenging and changing educational landscape".

In 2022, the University of Oregon opened The Ballmer Institute for Children’s Behavioral Health with its first students enrolling in fall 2023.

== Campus ==
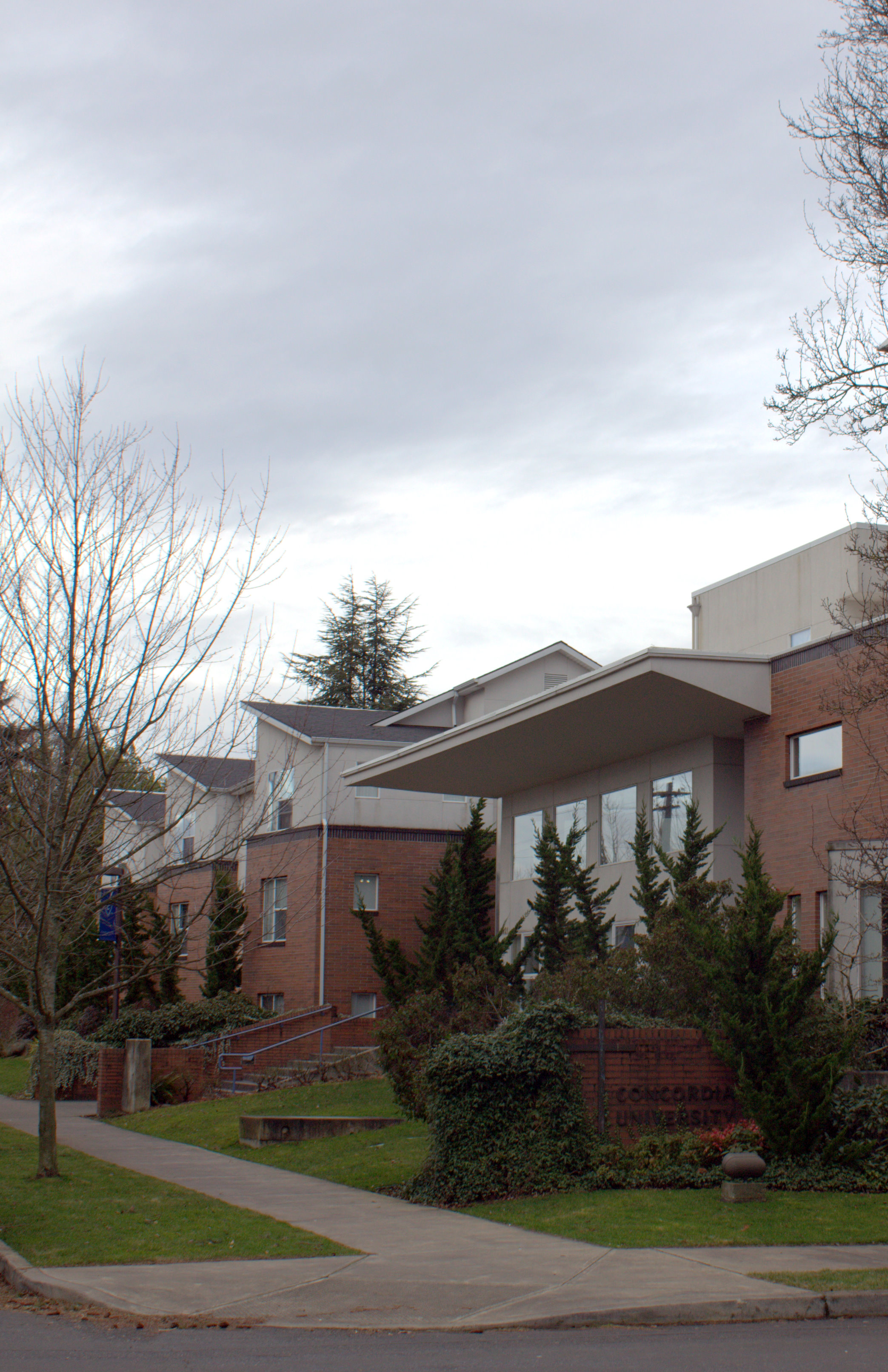
East residence hall

Located in Northeast Portland in the Concordia neighborhood, the university sat on a 13-acre (5.3 ha) campus near U.S. Route 30 Bypass (Lombard Street). The George R. White Library & Learning Center, a $15 million, 75,000 square feet (7,000 m^{2}) structure, opened across from the campus green in 2009. Other amenities on the campus included a 60-foot (18 m) tall bell tower and the 50,000-square-foot (4,600 m^{2}) Concordia Place Apartments, a residence hall.

== Academics ==
Concordia University contained four undergraduate colleges: College of Education, School of Management, College of Health and Human Services, and College of Arts and Sciences. Through these colleges the university offered a total of 18 majors and 20 concentrations. Additionally, the university offered graduate degrees in education and business administration and developed a law school, the Concordia University School of Law, in Boise, Idaho. Concordia had a dual enrollment agreement with Portland Community College.

In 2013, U.S. News & World Report ranked Concordia as 80th best among the regional universities in the west. Concordia University was accredited by the Northwest Commission on Colleges and Universities.

== Athletics ==
The Concordia athletic teams were called the Cavaliers. The university was a member of the Division II level of the National Collegiate Athletic Association (NCAA), primarily competing in the Great Northwest Athletic Conference (GNAC) from 2015–16 to 2019–20. The Cavaliers previously competed in the Cascade Collegiate Conference (CCC) of the National Association of Intercollegiate Athletics (NAIA) from 1993–94 to 2014–15. The official school colors were navy and white.

Concordia competed in 14 intercollegiate varsity sports: Men's sports included baseball, basketball, cross country, golf, soccer and track & field (indoor and outdoor); while women's sports included basketball, soccer, cross country, golf, softball, track & field (indoor and outdoor) and volleyball.

=== Accomplishments ===
Concordia was known for the consistent success of its athletic teams over the last several decades. Both men's and women's soccer established their programs with titles at the conference, regional and national level. Dan Birkey had coached the men's program for over 30 years and Grant Landy led the women's team for more than 22 years. Along with the successful soccer teams, the Cavaliers golf team dominated their former conference at the NAIA level, with the men winning 13 of 13 Cascade Collegiate Conference (CCC) titles since its inception in 1997. They were also champions of the 2016 inaugural Cavalier Invite. The track and field program included throwing (discus, hammer throw, javelin, and shot put) coach Jarred Rome, a two-time U.S. national champion and two-time Olympian, who ran the Throw Center.

=== Facilities ===
In 2012, Concordia opened a new athletic complex, Hilken Community Stadium, which was built at a cost of $7.5 million. The stadium was referred to as "Tuominen Yard" (for NAIA All-American Jarkko Tuominen) when set up for soccer usage and as "Porter Park" for baseball and softball.

== Notable alumni ==
- Don Benton - former member of the Washington State Senate; former Director of the Selective Service System
- Dave Reichert - former representative from Washington's 8th congressional district; former King County sheriff
- Charles Sams director of the National Park Service and member of the North West Power Planning Council
- Paul Simon - late U.S. Senator from Illinois
- Gregory N. Todd - 20th Chaplain of the Marine Corps
- Jay Ellis - actor, Insecure
