= Larry Monroe Boyle =

American judge

Larry M. Boyle

Justice of the Idaho Supreme Court
- In office August 1989 – March 1992
- Appointed by: Cecil Andrus
- Preceded by: Robert C. Huntley
- Succeeded by: Linda Copple Trout

Personal details
- Born: June 23, 1943 (age 82) Seattle, Washington
- Died: November 23, 2017 (aged 74)
- Spouse: Beverly Rigby Boyle
- Children: 5 sons, 1 daughter
- Education: Brigham Young University, B.A. 1968; University of Idaho, J.D., 1972

Larry Monroe Boyle (June 23, 1943 – November 23, 2017) was a justice of the Idaho Supreme Court from 1989 to 1992.

Born in Seattle, Washington, and raised in Pocatello, Idaho, Boyle graduated from Pocatello High School in 1961 and was a missionary in Ireland for the Church of Jesus Christ of Latter-day Saints from 1964 to 1966. He then graduated from Brigham Young University in 1968 with a degree in economics, served in the U.S. Army, and received his J.D. from the University of Idaho College of Law in 1972.

Boyle entered the practice of law in Idaho Falls with the law firm of Hanson, Boyle, Beard and Martin, until 1986, when he was appointed to a seat on Idaho's 7th District bench. He also served as president of the 7th District Bar Association, and as a member of the Idaho Judicial Council, which made recommendations on the appointment of judges. While serving as a district judge, Boyle was called up to fill in on the Idaho Supreme Court on several occasions. In 1989, Governor Cecil Andrus appointed Boyle to the state supreme court, which was well-received even by political opponents of the governor.

Boyle resigned from the court in March 1992 to become a U.S. magistrate judge, and retired in 2008.

== See also ==
- List of justices of the Idaho Supreme Court

Political offices
Preceded by Robert C. Huntley	Justice of the Idaho Supreme Court; 1989–1992	Succeeded by Linda Copple Trout
