= Robyn Brody =

American judge (born 1970)

Chief Justice of the Idaho Supreme Court
- Incumbent
- Assumed office October 1, 2026
- Preceded by: G. Richard Bevan

Justice of the Idaho Supreme Court
- Incumbent
- Assumed office January 5, 2017
- Preceded by: Jim Jones

Personal details
- Born: February 13, 1970 (age 56) Wayne, Michigan, U.S.
- Spouse: Jonathan Brody
- Children: 2 sons
- Education: University of Denver (BA, JD)

Robyn Michelle Maddox Brody (born February 13, 1970) is an American justice of the Idaho Supreme Court, since 2017. Elected to an open seat in November 2016, she is the third woman to serve on the state's highest court, and the first elected rather than appointed by the governor. Prior to her election, Brody was in private practice for nineteen years in south central Idaho, in Twin Falls and Rupert.

== Early years ==
Brody was born on February 13, 1970, in Wayne, Michigan, Brody's parents worked for United Airlines, her father as a ramp agent and her mother in kitchen operations. When Brody was 12, her family relocated to Denver, Colorado, and after graduation from Aurora's Rangeview High School in 1988, she accepted a scholarship at the University of Denver. Brody earned a bachelor's degree in international and Russian studies in 1992.

== Career ==
After graduating, Brody traveled to Russia and spent a year in Saint Petersburg, teaching tenth grade English and studying Russian. She returned to Denver in 1993 and entered Sturm College of Law in a dual-degree program in law (J.D.) and international management, graduating in 1997.

Brody joined a private firm in Twin Falls and stayed for thirteen years, the last ten as a partner. She left the firm in 2010 to begin her own firm in Rupert, where she and her family had moved.

== Election ==
Following Chief Justice Jim Jones' retirement announcement in March 2016, Brody entered the election race for the high court's open seat. She finished first in the field of four in May with 30.3%, and won the run-off in November over state senator Curt McKenzie of Nampa, with 53.8% of the vote.

On January 5, 2017, Brody was sworn into office by retired Chief Justice Linda Copple Trout, the first woman to serve on the court, from 1992 to 2007. She ran unopposed in May 2022 for her second term.

== Personal ==
Brody's husband is Jonathan P. Brody, a district judge in Rupert since 2010. Also a graduate of the University of Denver, he received his Juris Doctor degree from the University of Colorado. The couple was married in 1997, and they have two sons.

Legal offices
Preceded by Jim Jones	Justice of the Idaho Supreme Court; 2017–present	Incumbent
Preceded by G. Richard Bevan	Chief Justice of the Idaho Supreme Court; 2026–present	Incumbent
