= Wayne Kidwell =

American judge and politician (1938–2025)

Justice of the Idaho Supreme Court
- In office January 1999 – January 2005
- Appointed by: Election
- Preceded by: Byron J. Johnson
- Succeeded by: Jim Jones

Idaho Attorney General
- In office January 1975 – January 1979
- Governor: Cecil Andrus; John Evans
- Preceded by: W. Anthony Park
- Succeeded by: David Leroy

Member of the Idaho Senate
- In office January 13, 1969 – January 10, 1972

Prosecuting Attorney of Ada County, Idaho
- In office 1966

Personal details
- Born: Wayne LeRoy Kidwell; June 15, 1938 Council, Idaho, U.S.
- Died: November 7, 2025 (aged 87) Boise, Idaho, U.S.
- Party: Republican
- Spouse: Cheryl Ann "Shari" Linn Kidwell
- Children: 3 sons
- Education: University of Idaho (BS, JD)
- Profession: Attorney

Military service
- Allegiance: United States
- Branch/service: U.S. Army
- Years of service: 1961–1963
- Rank: Captain
- Unit: Military Police
- Battles/wars: Cold War

Wayne LeRoy Kidwell (June 15, 1938 – November 7, 2025) was an American lawyer and jurist who served as an Associate Justice on the Idaho Supreme Court, Idaho Attorney General, and Majority Leader of the Idaho Senate. He was also an associate deputy attorney general in the administration of President Ronald Reagan.

== Early life and education ==
Born in Council, Idaho, Kidwell graduated from Boise High School in 1956. He attended the University of Idaho in Moscow, was a member of the Sigma Chi fraternity, and graduated in 1960 with a degree in pre-law. He spent a year in law school and then went on active duty with the U.S. Army, as an officer in the military police in New Jersey and South Korea. After his military service, Kidwell returned to the UI and earned a J.D. from its College of Law. During law school, he served for a summer as an aide to U.S. Senator Len Jordan.

== Career ==
After a few years representing insurance companies in Boise, Kidwell ran successfully for Ada County prosecutor. Two years later, Kidwell won a race for a seat in the Idaho Senate, and a year later became the majority leader. He ran for the congressional seat in 1972 that Jim McClure was vacating for the U.S. Senate, but lost in the Republican primary to Steve Symms and returned private legal practice for several years.

=== Idaho Attorney General ===
In 1974, Kidwell defeated incumbent Idaho Attorney General Tony Park. He served one four-year term and considered a run for governor in 1978, but withdrew from the race in August 1977; he returned campaign donations, telling Idaho voters that he was taking a sabbatical to travel with his family.

Kidwell tried again for the congressional seat in 1980 vacated by Symms, but lost the primary to state senator Larry Craig, and then moved his family to Hawaii.

=== Federal service ===
After joining a notable firm in Hawaii as a partner, Kidwell in 1982 was appointed U.S. associate deputy attorney general, and he represented the Republic of the Marshall Islands as its appointed attorney general.

=== Idaho Supreme Court ===
After returning to Idaho and working in private practice for close to a decade, Kidwell ran for the Idaho Supreme Court in May 1994 against incumbent Justice Cathy Silak and lost. Four years later, Kidwell ran again for an open seat and won a three-way race in May and the run-off in November; he was the second in Idaho history to win elections in all three branches of state government (after former Chief Justice Allan Shepard), and was sworn in on January 4, 1999.

Kidwell served one full six-year term on the court and retired at age 66 in January 2005, succeeded by Jim Jones.

== Death ==
Kidwell died on November 7, 2025, at the age of 87.
