= Cynthia Meyer (judge) =

American judge

Justice of the Idaho Supreme Court
- Incumbent
- Assumed office December 2023
- Appointed by: Brad Little
- Preceded by: John Stegner

Personal details
- Born: c. 1960 (age 65–66) Mountain Home, Idaho, U.S.
- Education: College of Idaho (BA); University of Utah (JD)

Cynthia K.C. Meyer (born c. 1960) is an American lawyer who has served as an associate justice of the Idaho Supreme Court since 2023 after being appointed by Governor Brad Little. She previously served as a judge of the Idaho 1st Judicial District Court from 2015 to 2023.

== Education ==
Born in Idaho at Mountain Home, Meyer later lived in Pocatello and graduated from Pocatello High School. She received a Bachelor of Arts in political science from the College of Idaho in 1982 and a Juris Doctor from the S.J. Quinney College of Law of the University of Utah in 1987.

== Career ==
Meyer practiced law for over thirty years in Salt Lake City and Coeur d'Alene, the latter as a partner at James, Vernon, and Weeks, P.A. She also served as an adjunct professor at North Idaho College from 2005 to 2009. On May 1, 2015, she was appointed by Governor Butch Otter to serve as a judge of the 1st Judicial District Court to fill the vacancy left by the retirement of Judge Benjamin Simpson.

=== Idaho Supreme Court ===
In 2017, Meyer was one of multiple applicants who applied to fill the vacancy left by the retirement of Justice Warren Jones. In October 2023, Meyer was one of four candidates submitted to the governor for appointment to the Idaho Supreme Court. On November 6, 2023, Governor Brad Little announced the appointment of Meyer to serve as an associate justice of the Idaho Supreme Court, to fill the vacancy left by the retirement of John Stegner. Meyer was sworn into office in December 2023. On January 5, 2024, a public investiture was held where she was ceremoniously sworn-in. She ran unopposed in the 2026 election, held during the state primary in the spring.

Legal offices
Preceded by John Stegner	Justice of the Idaho Supreme Court; 2023–present	Incumbent
