= Cynthia Meyer =

Cynthia Meyer may refer to:

- Cynthia Meyer (sport shooter)
- Cynthia Meyer (judge)
