= Robert M. Robson =

American politician, Attorney General of Idaho

Robert Robson

25th Attorney General of Idaho
- In office 1969–1971
- Governor: Don Samuelson
- Preceded by: Allan Shepard
- Succeeded by: W. Anthony Park

Personal details
- Born: Robert Morgan Robson; November 28, 1921 Kellogg, Idaho, U.S.
- Died: September 5, 2006 (aged 84) Hayden, Idaho, U.S.
- Party: Republican
- Spouse: Catherine Penelope Agee (m. 1944–2006) (his death)
- Children: 4 (2 daughters, 2 sons)
- Education: University of Idaho (LLB)

Military service
- Branch/service: United States Navy
- Years of service: 1941–1944
- Unit: Naval Air Training Command
- Battles/wars: World War II

Robert Morgan Robson (November 28, 1921 – September 5, 2006) was an American attorney and politician who was the 25th attorney general of Idaho, from 1969 to 1971.

== Early life and education ==
Robson was born and raised in Kellogg, Idaho. After graduating from its high school, he studied pre-med at the University of Idaho in Moscow. He later earned a law degree from the UI College of Law.

== Career ==
Robson joined the United States Navy in 1941 and was assigned to the Naval Air Training Command. After graduating from law school, he served as district attorney for the Trust Territory of the Pacific Islands. He also held positions in the Idaho Republican Party, including state finance chair and member of the executive committee.

He served as Idaho's 25th attorney general from 1969 to 1971, appointed by Governor Don Samuelson following the election of predecessor Allan Shepard to the Idaho Supreme Court. In 1970, Robson argued on behalf of Idaho in Oregon v. Mitchell; later that year in the November election, he was defeated by Democrat Tony Park.

After leaving office in 1971, he practiced law in Boise and Phoenix, Arizona.

== Personal life ==
Robson and his wife, Catherine Penelope Agee, were married from 1944 until his death in 2006. They had four children and lived in Hayden, Idaho.
