= Gerald F. Schroeder =

American judge (born 1939)

Chief Justice of Idaho
- In office September 1, 2004 – July 31, 2007
- Preceded by: Linda Copple Trout
- Succeeded by: Daniel Eismann

Justice of the Idaho Supreme Court
- In office January 20, 1995 – July 31, 2007
- Appointed by: Phil Batt
- Preceded by: Stephen Bistline
- Succeeded by: Warren Jones

Personal details
- Born: September 13, 1939 (age 87) Boise, Idaho, U.S.
- Education: College of Idaho (BA); Harvard University (JD)
- Profession: Attorney

Gerald Frank Schroeder (born September 13, 1939) is a former American attorney and jurist who served as chief justice of Idaho. He was appointed to the court in 1995 by Governor Phil Batt, and was elected chief justice by his peers in 2004. He served on the court for over a dozen years and retired in July 2007.

== Early life and education ==
Born in Boise, Idaho, Schroeder attended public schools in Caldwell, Idaho and Baker, Oregon, where he was salutatorian at Baker High School in 1957. He earned a Bachelor of Arts in History from the College of Idaho in Caldwell in 1961, and initially planned on becoming a history professor. He took the Law School Admission Test (LSAT) on a whim and was accepted to Harvard Law School, earning his J.D. in 1964.

== Career ==
After graduating from law school, Schroeder returned to Idaho and worked for several firms in Boise for three years. He was then appointed a deputy U.S. attorney in 1967, became a county probate judge in 1969, and a magistrate two years later. He became a state judge in 1975 in the fourth district (Boise), a position he held for two decades, until his appointment to the state supreme court in January 1995. Schroeder retained his seat in 1996 and 2002, running unopposed in both statewide elections.

As a district judge, Schroeder made headlines in 1987 as he ruled that the state lottery initiative, approved by voters the previous November, was unconstitutional. His decision was upheld 4-1 by the state supreme court, and resulted in an amendment to the state constitution. Voters approved that in November 1988, and the lottery was launched in July 1989.

Schroeder ordered the execution of double-murderer Keith Wells in 1992. Carried out in January 1994, it was Idaho's first execution in over 36 years and the tenth in state history. He was among the officials that witnessed the execution by lethal injection at the Idaho State Correctional Institution.

Political offices
Preceded by Linda Copple Trout	Chief Justice of the Idaho Supreme Court; 2004–2007	Succeeded by Daniel Eismann
