= Concordia University School of Law =

Coordinates: 43.612°N 116.202°W

- Parent school: Concordia University; Portland, Oregon
- Established: 2011, 15 years ago
- School type: Private
- Parent endowment: $7.2 million
- Location: Boise, Idaho, United States
- USNWR ranking: (defunct)
- Website: law.cu-portland.edu

Concordia University School of Law was a private law school in Boise, Idaho. It admitted its first class of 75 students in August 2012. The school was part of Concordia University, a private Lutheran university based in Portland, Oregon. It was the second law school in Idaho and the first in Boise, residing in a university-owned campus at 501 West Front Street near the Idaho State Capitol.

Concordia Law closed at the end of the Summer 2020 term in connection with the closure of its parent institution.

== History ==
Concordia University announced it would open a law school in 2007, with the school looking at locations in Washington, California, and Idaho. In November of that year the small Lutheran school announced they were looking at Boise as the location under consideration in Idaho. Boise is the state’s most populous city and one of the largest metropolitan areas in the United States that did not have a law school. Proposed locations included using the Carnegie Public Library on a temporary basis.

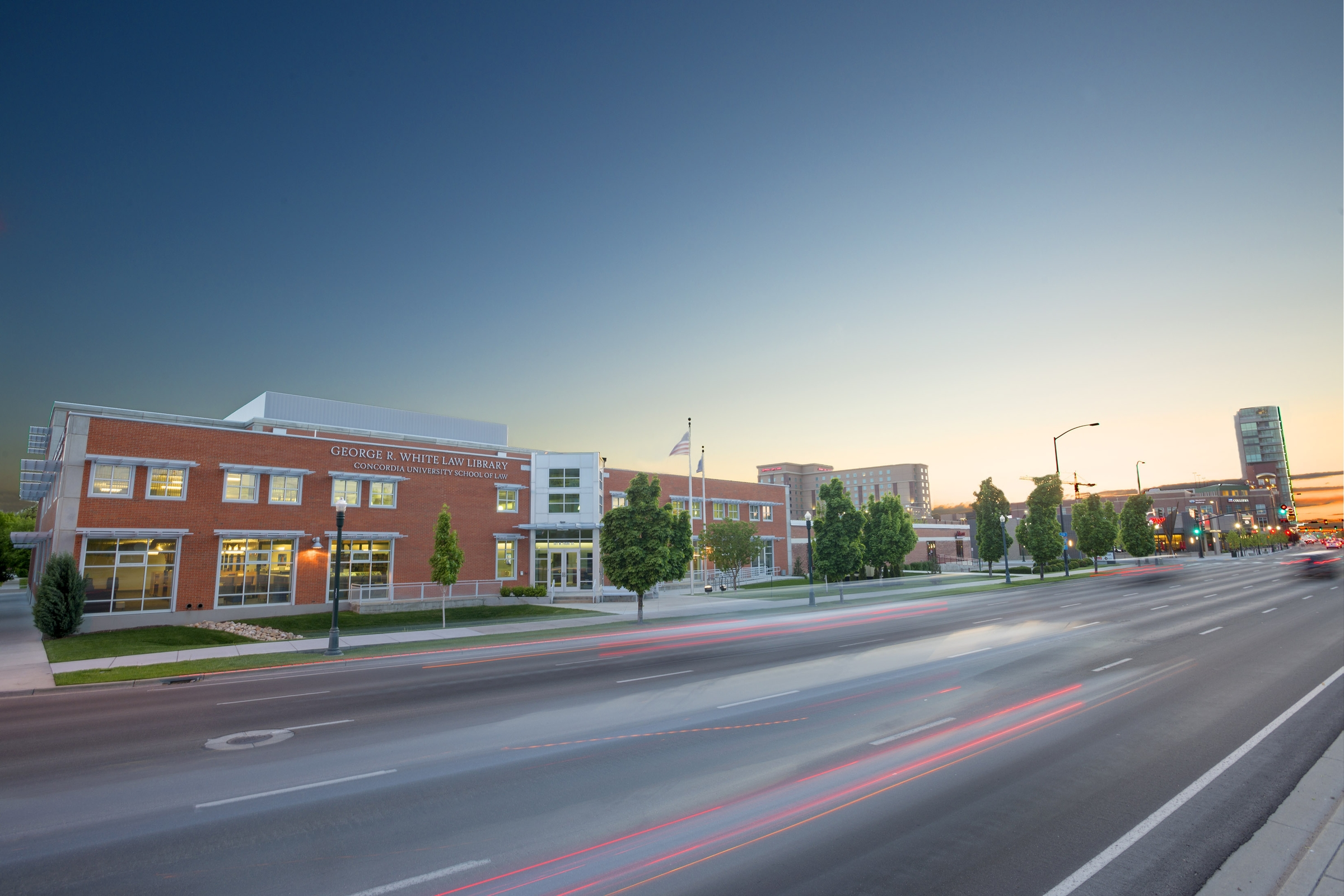

The law school was originally scheduled to open in 2009, but an increase in the start-up costs from $4 million to $7 million delayed the planned opening to allow for additional fund-raising. Idaho's only law school, the University of Idaho's (UI) College of Law in Moscow, 300 miles (480 km) north, also had plans to open a campus in the city at that time. In August 2008, Concordia announced the school would be delayed until the fall of 2010, and Idaho’s Board of Education decided against allowing UI to add a full three-year program in Boise. Instead, UI would be allowed to open a program for third-year students, also to open in fall 2010.

Concordia narrowed its search for a dean of the law school to two people by August 2008, and in December 2008 choose former Idaho Court of Appeals judge and Idaho Supreme Court justice Cathy Silak to lead the school. Expected to cost $7 million and take 18-months to open, the original plan called for an entering class of 70 students in fall 2010 with a faculty of 15. By December 2008 Concordia had raised $1.5 million for the law school and by 2009 had pushed the opening back to fall 2011. Concordia announced plans to buy a building at 501 Front Street in Boise in January 2010 to house the campus. The purchase was expected to close in April and be for about $2 million.

Concordia announced in January 2010 it planned to open in fall 2012 with 75-95 students and an annual tuition of around $28,500, with enrollment projected to later increase to 250. The school planned to apply for provisional accreditation by the American Bar Association (ABA) after its first year of operation (fall 2013). The school opened in August 2012 with 75 students. In July 2014, the ABA withheld provisional accreditation from the school, with 48 of 102 students at the school then transferring, taking a leave of absence, or withdrawing from Concordia. The ABA planned to seek additional information, and the school hoped to gain provisional accreditation later in 2014. In August 2014, the ABA continued Concordia’s application for provisional approval. The ABA sent a fact-finding team to Boise in September 2014 and the Council granted ABA Provisional Approval on June 6, 2015.

On June 8, 2015, Concordia announced that the law school had received provisional accreditation from the ABA. On August 8, 2015, Concordia graduated its first law school class. On May 14, 2016, Boise State University and Concordia Law launched a joint law degree program that allows students to complete their undergraduate and law school education in six years: three years at Boise State, followed by the three-year juris doctor program at Concordia Law. Concordia Law currently has similar 3+3 partnerships with its main campus in Portland, along with Concordia University Texas and Concordia University St. Paul.

After founding dean Cathy R. Silak was promoted to vice president of community engagement in June 2016, Concordia University launched a nationwide search for a dean of the School of Law, which led to the appointment of Elena Langan as the new dean of the law school beginning in January 2017.

The Council of the Section of Legal Education and Admissions to the Bar of the American Bar Association granted full ABA approval to Concordia University School of Law at its meeting on February 21, 2019. On March 1, 2019, Concordia University School of Law announced its full ABA approval.

In early 2020, Concordia University in Portland announced that it would close at the end of the spring semester as it faced significant financial challenges. The law school subsequently announced its plans to affiliated with Concordia University in St. Paul, Minnesota. However, the law school was unable to reach a final agreement with Concordia-St. Paul and announced in June 2020 that it would close at the end of the summer term.

== Campus ==
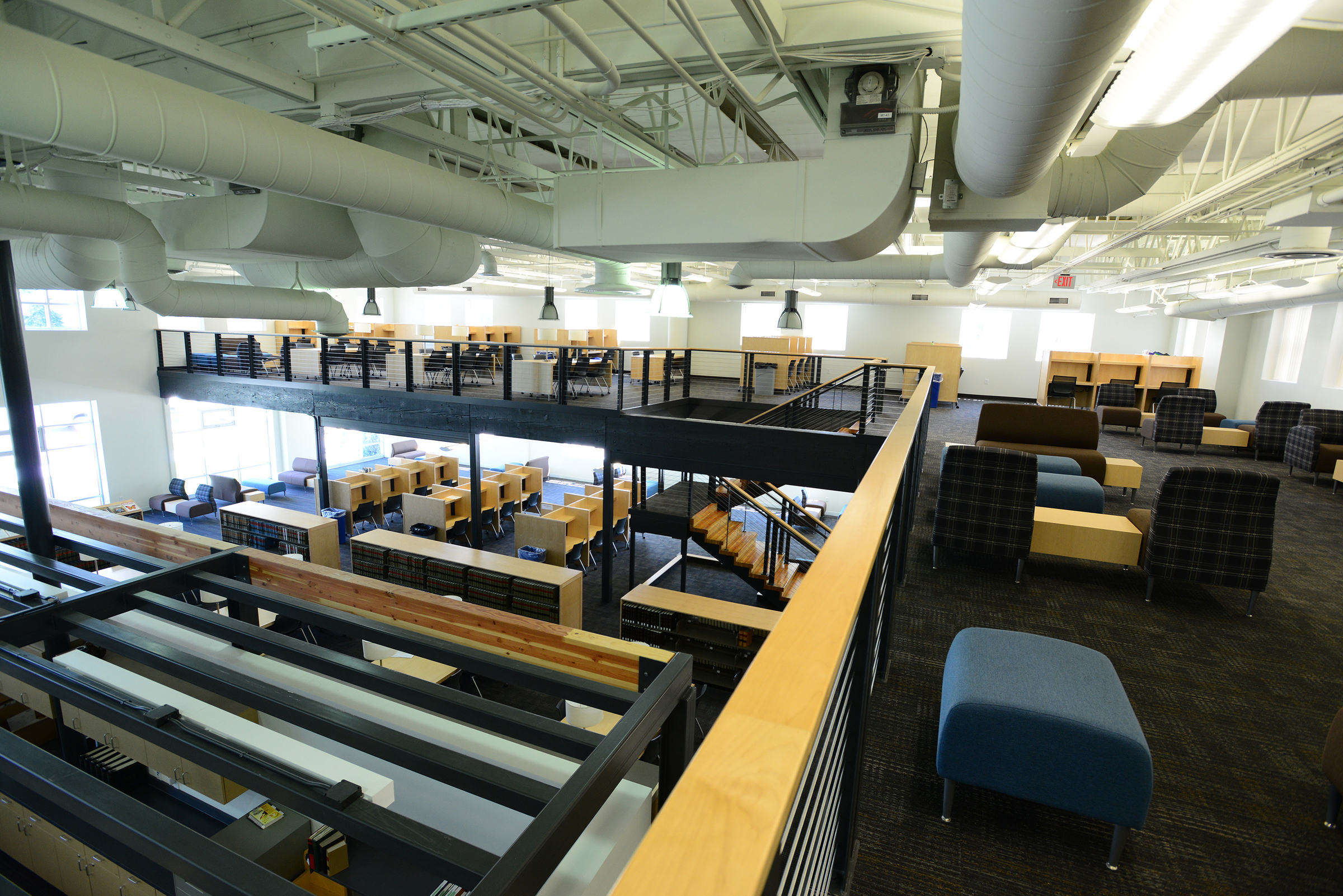

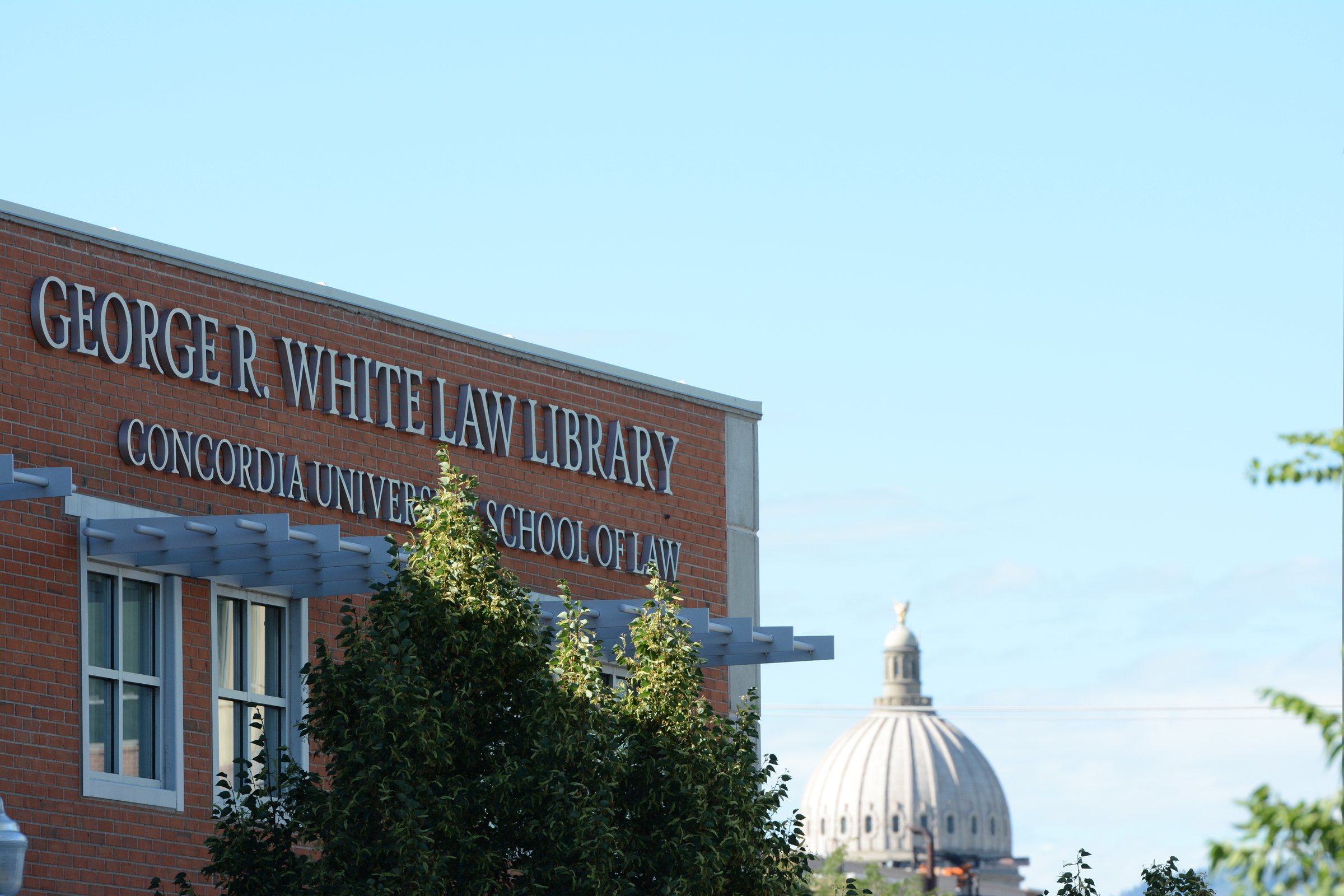

The law school building was in downtown Boise at 501 West Front Street near the Idaho State Capitol, the Ada County Courthouse and the Idaho Supreme Court buildings. Concordia chose to add a law school in Boise over its main Portland campus primarily since Portland already has one law school with Lewis & Clark Law School and Salem just south of Portland has Willamette University College of Law. Additionally, Concordia has strong ties to the Boise area with students, donors, and several board of trustees coming from Boise, plus Boise was one of the largest metropolitan areas lacking a law school, yet is home to the state supreme court and about half of all the lawyers in Idaho. The first building on the campus was a two-story brick building with 17,000 square feet (1,600 m^{2}) of space. The law school completed construction in 2010 of a three-story extension of the original building located directly south of the existing structure to add 30,000 square feet (2,800 m^{2}) for more offices and classrooms. The school's library was known as the George R. White Law Library. The library occupied the largest part of the building and was located in the north wing. The library housed a collection of electronic and print resources, and provided its law students with study carrels, group study rooms, a popular reading and conversation room, and a copy center.

The Concordia University School of Law campus was certified as a Leadership in Energy and Environmental Design (LEED) building.

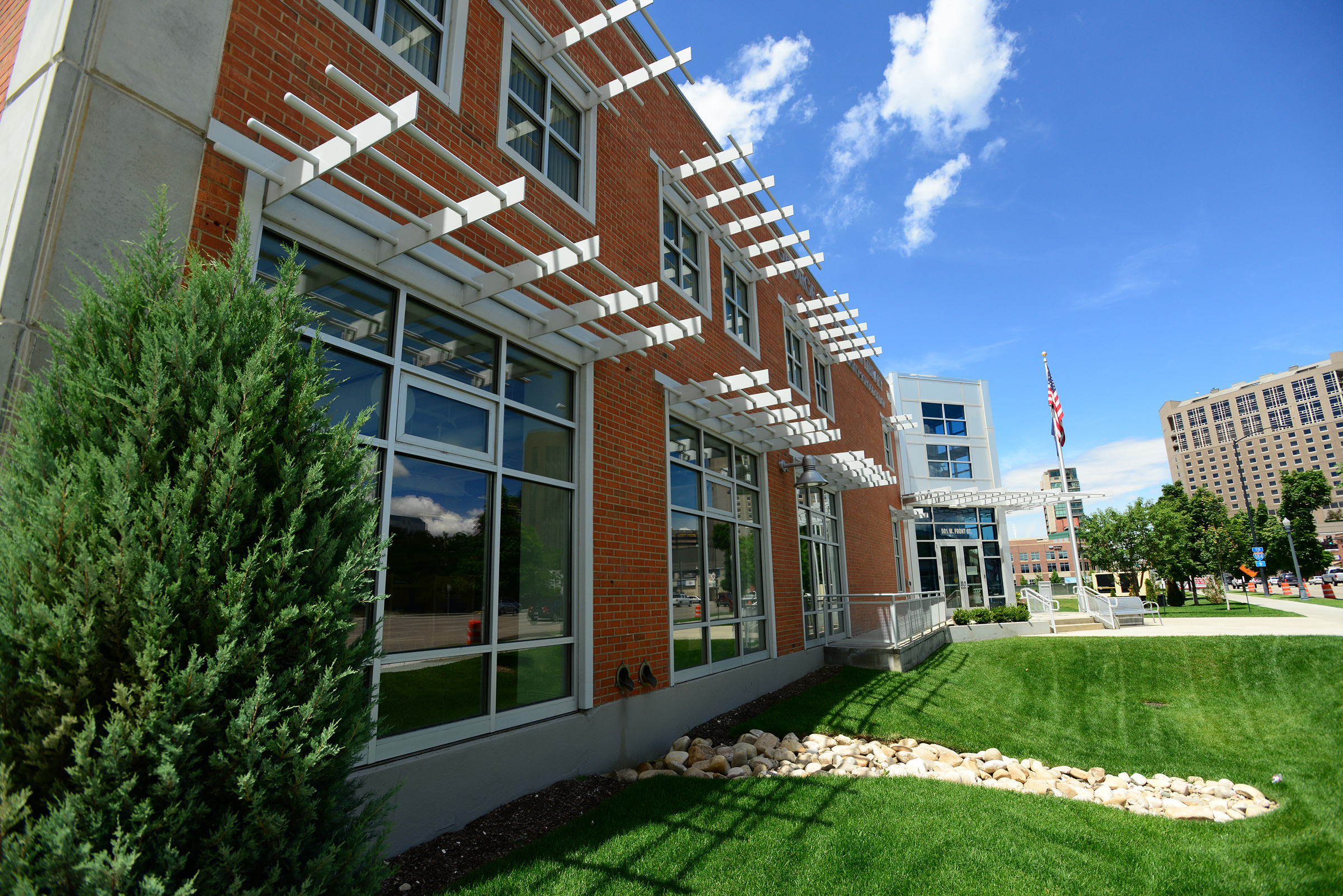

== 5th & Front ==
The Concordia University School of Law launched 5th & Front to provide pro-bono legal services to the community, and house legal clinic and mentorship opportunities for its students. 5th & Front provided access to legal services for underserved populations – such as juveniles, veterans, immigrants, refugees, and families living in poverty. Clinics covered a wide range of issues, such as housing, asylum and citizenship, domestic violence, wills and estate planning, and more.

== Grants and scholarships ==
Each student at the law school received a service grant of $15,000 ($5,000 per year for full-time students and prorated based on the number of credits taken each term for part-time students). Merit-based scholarships ranged from $3,000 to $14,000 each year and were renewable for students who remained in good academic standing.

== Law journal ==
The inaugural issue of the school’s law journal, Concordia Law Review, was published from March 2016 to April 2020.

== See also ==
- List of defunct law schools in the United States
