= 1972 United States Senate election in Idaho =

- November 7, 1972
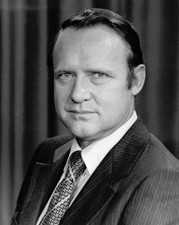

Nominee	Jim McClure	Bud Davis
Party	Republican	Democratic
Popular vote	161,804	140,915
Percentage	52.26%	45.52%
- County results McClure: 50–60% 60–70% Davis: 40–50% 50–60% 60–70%
U.S. senator before election
Len Jordan
Republican
Elected U.S. Senator
Jim McClure
Republican

The 1972 United States Senate election in Idaho took place on November 7; incumbent Len Jordan did not run for re-election. Republican U.S. Representative Jim McClure was elected to succeed him over Democrat Bud Davis.

== Republican primary ==
=== Candidates ===
- George Hansen, congressman from Pocatello
- Jim McClure, congressman from Payette
- Robert Smylie, former three-term governor (1955–1967)
- Glenn Wegner, physician-attorney from Kendrick

=== Results ===
1972 Republican U.S. Senate primary
Party	Candidate	Votes	%
Republican	Jim McClure	46,522	36.06%
Republican	George Hansen	35,412	27.45%
Republican	Glenn Wegner	24,582	19.05%
Republican	Robert Smylie	22,497	17.44%
Total votes		129,013	100.00%

== Democratic primary ==
=== Candidates ===
- Rose Bowman, activist from Boise
- Bud Davis, president of Idaho State University
- Byron Johnson, attorney from Boise
- Tony Park, attorney general

=== Results ===
1972 Democratic U.S. Senate primary
Party	Candidate	Votes	%
Democratic	Bud Davis	23,953	36.05%
Democratic	Tony Park	17,636	26.54%
Democratic	Byron Johnson	15,526	23.37%
Democratic	Rose Bowman	9,327	14.04%
Total votes		66,442	100.00%

== General election ==
=== Results ===
General election results
Party	Candidate	Votes	%	±%
Republican	Jim McClure	161,804	52.26%	▼3.12
Democratic	Bud Davis	140,915	45.52%	▲0.90
American	Jean L. Stoddard	6,885	2.22%	N/A
Total votes		309,604	100.00%	

== See also ==
- 1972 United States Senate elections
