= Charles Donaldson =

Charles Donaldson may refer to:

- Charles R. Donaldson (1919–1987), Idaho Supreme Court justice
- Charles Edward McArthur Donaldson (1903–1964), Scottish Unionist Party politician
- Charles Donaldson-Hudson (1840–1893), English Conservative politician, born "Charles Donaldson"
