= Byron J. Johnson =

American judge (1937–2012)

Associate Justice of the Idaho Supreme Court
- In office January 1988 – January 1999
- Preceded by: Charles R. Donaldson
- Succeeded by: Wayne Kidwell

Personal details
- Born: August 2, 1937 Boise, Idaho, U.S.
- Died: December 9, 2012 (aged 75) Boise, Idaho
- Cause of death: Mandibular cancer
- Party: Democratic
- Spouse(s): Patricia G. Young (1984–2012, his death); Marie E. Rauseo (1960–1980, divorce)
- Children: 4 – (2 sons, 2 daughters)
- Education: Harvard College (BA); Harvard Law School (LLB)
- Occupation: jurist, attorney

Byron Jerald Johnson (August 2, 1937 – December 9, 2012) was an attorney and an associate justice of the Idaho Supreme Court from 1988 to 1999.

== Biography ==
Johnson graduated from Boise High School in 1955 then attended Harvard College, where he was a pitcher for the Crimson baseball team. After earning his bachelor's degree in history in 1959, he attended Harvard Law School, graduated in 1962, and returned to Boise to work in private practice.

In 1980, Johnson served on a committee assembled at the request of the Idaho Supreme Court to recommend revisions to the state's criminal sentencing statutes, for which Johnson wrote standards that came to by used by judges in the state in sentencing in capital cases.

On December 17, 1987, Governor Cecil Andrus announced Johnson's appointment to the state supreme court, having selected Johnson from a list of candidates recommended by the Idaho Judicial Council. Andrus cited Johnson's experience and status as a practicing attorney in making the decision. He ran unopposed in the 1992 election, served out the six-year term, and retired at age 61 in January 1999. His successor was former state attorney general Wayne Kidwell, elected in November.

Johnson died at age 75 at his home in Boise following complications of mandibular cancer.

Political offices
Preceded by Charles R. Donaldson	Justice of the Idaho Supreme Court; 1988–1999	Succeeded by Wayne Kidwell
