= Charles McDevitt =

Charles McDevitt may refer to:

- Charles F. McDevitt (1932–2021), Justice of the Idaho Supreme Court
- Chas McDevitt (born 1934), Scottish musician
