= Byron Johnson =

Byron Johnson may refer to:

- Ban Johnson (Byron Bancroft Johnson, 1864–1931), American baseball executive, founder of the American League
- Boss Johnson (Byron Ingemar Johnson, 1890–1964), Premier of British Columbia, Canada
- Byron F. Johnson (1894–1980), United States Marine Corps general
- Byron Johnson (baseball) (1911–2005), American baseball player in the Negro leagues
- Byron L. Johnson (1917–2000), U.S. Representative from Colorado
- Byron J. Johnson (1937–2012), justice of the Idaho Supreme Court
