= Frank L. Benson =

American attorney

23rd Attorney General of Idaho
- In office 1959–1963
- Governor: Robert E. Smylie
- Preceded by: Graydon W. Smith
- Succeeded by: Allan Shepard

Personal details
- Political party: Democratic

Frank L. Benson is an American attorney and politician who served as the 23rd attorney general of Idaho from 1959 to 1963.

== Career ==
Benson was elected as attorney general of Idaho in 1958 and assumed office in 1959. Benson soon developed a tense relationship with Governor Robert E. Smylie and became known for his erratic behavior. He also alleged that Smylie was bugging his office. During his tenure, Benson initiated an investigation into gasoline prices in Southern Idaho.

Benson's legal advice was often viewed as irrational and government departments began the practice of hiring their own attorneys. Benson also caused physical damage to his office while searching for listening devices. Benson left office in 1963 and was succeeded by Allan Shepard.
