= 2026 Idaho gubernatorial election =

- November 3, 2026
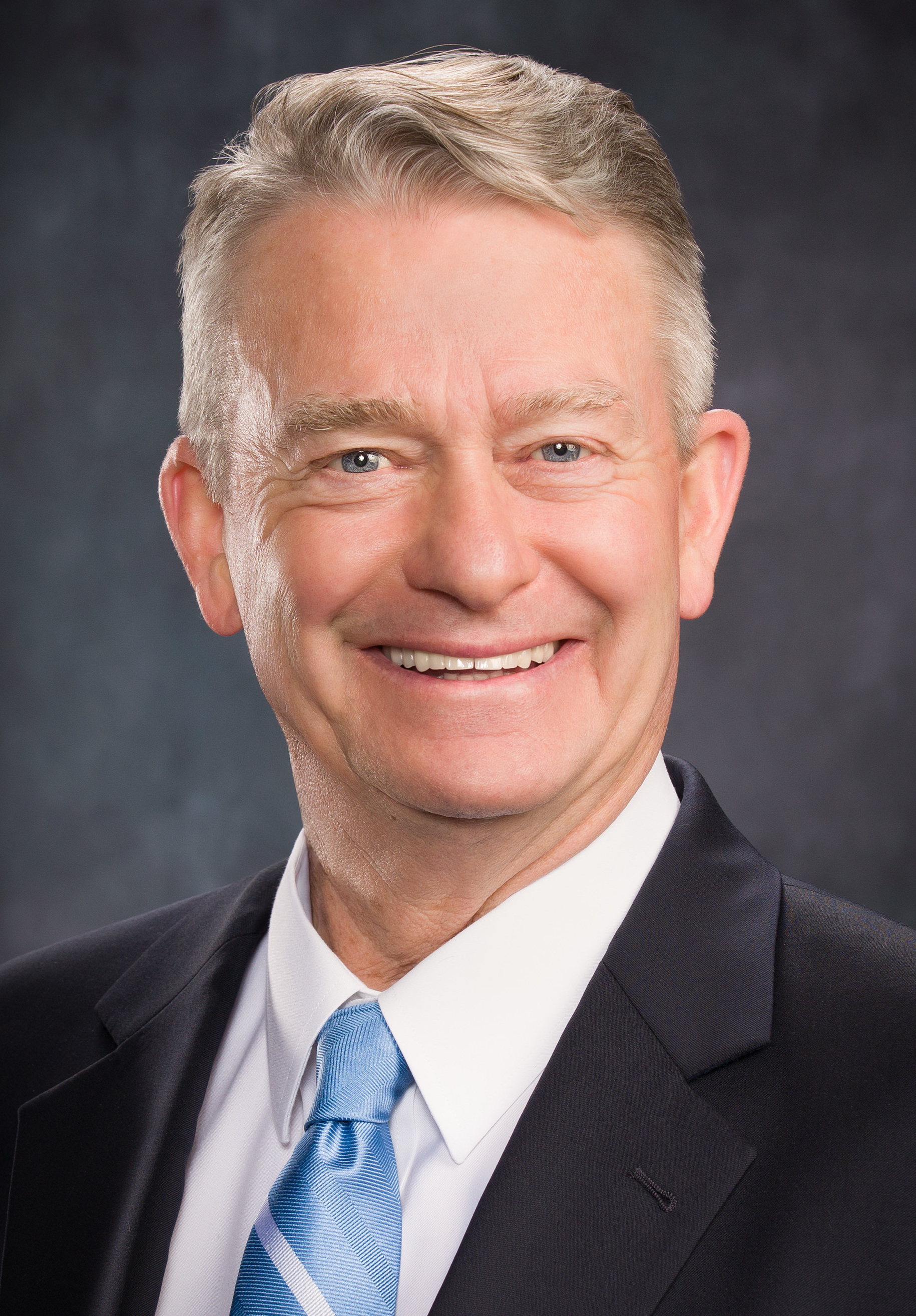

Nominee	Brad Little	Terri Pickens	John Stegner
Party	Republican	Democratic	Independent
Popular vote	408,410	231,475	54,867
Percentage	57.03%	32.33%	7.66%
- Little: 40–50% 50–60% 60–70% 70–80% 80–90% Pickens: 50–60% 60–70%
Governor before election
Brad Little
Republican
Elected Governor
Brad Little
Republican

The 2026 Idaho gubernatorial election was held on November 3, 2026, to elect the governor of Idaho. Republican incumbent Brad Little was elected to a third term. He was challenged by Democratic attorney Terri Pickens.

Primary elections took place on May 19, 2026.

== Republican primary ==
=== Candidates ===
==== Nominee ====
- Brad Little, incumbent governor (2019–present)

==== Eliminated in primary ====
- Sean Calvert Crystal, candidate for Idaho's 32nd legislative district in 2024
- Mark Fitzpatrick, former police officer and owner of Old State Saloon
- Daniel Fowler
- Ethan Giles
- Ron James, Teton County commissioner
- Lisa Marie, perennial candidate
- Justin Plante, mechanic

=== Endorsements ===
Brad Little

Executive branch officials

- Donald Trump, president of the United States (2017–2021, 2025–present)

Labor unions

- ~~Idaho Education Association~~ (endorsement rescinded)
- Idaho Fraternal Order of Police
- Professional Firefighters of Idaho

=== Fundraising ===
Campaign finance reports as of March 31, 2026
Candidate	Contributions	Cash Balance
Brad Little (R)	$1,928,267	$1,162,552
Mark Fitzpatrick (R)	$185,753	$35,959
Source: Idaho Sunshine

=== Primary results ===
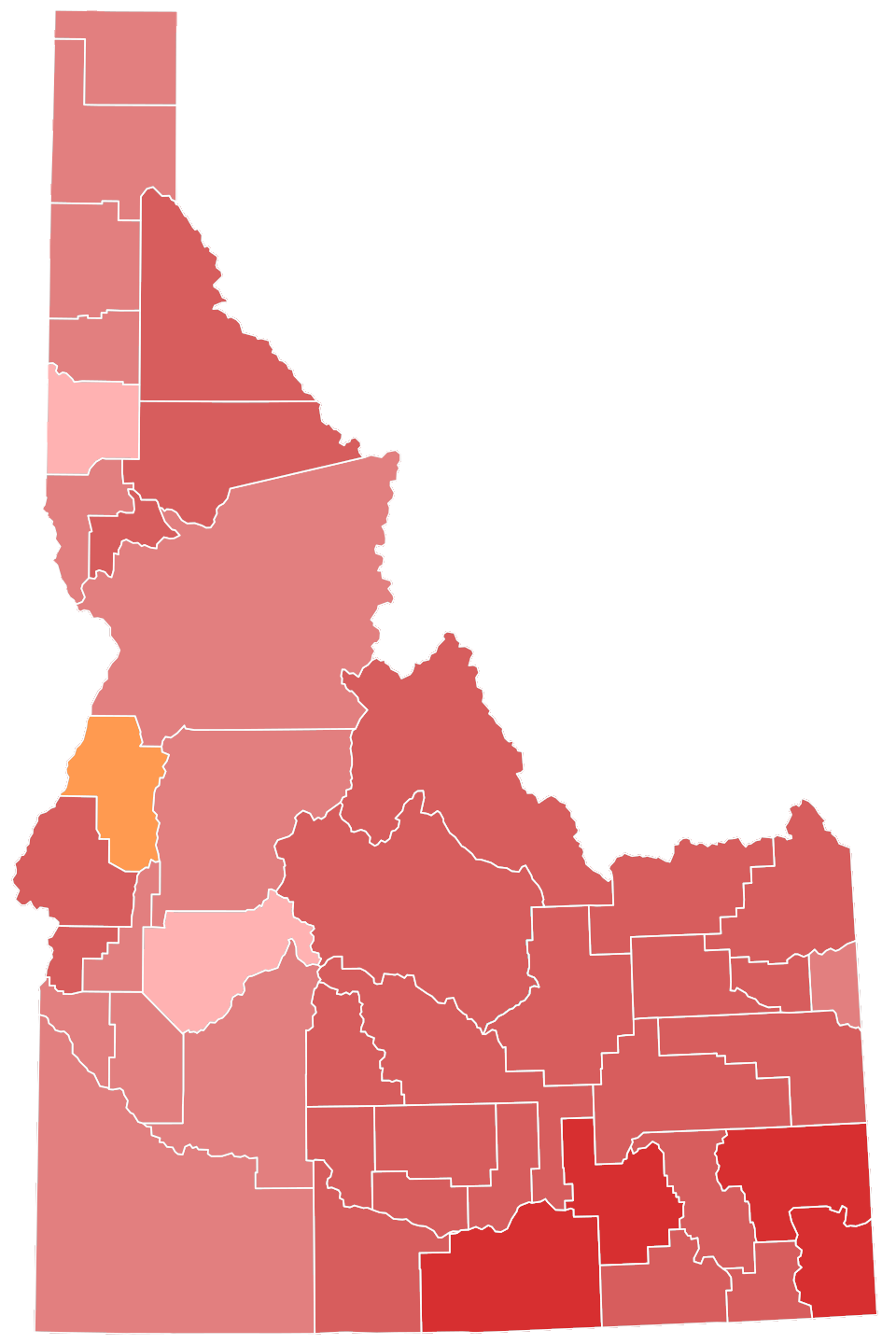
Results by county Little: 40–50%; 50–60%; 60–70%; 70–80%; Fitzpatrick: 40–50%

Results by precinct: Little: 30–40%; 40–50%; 50–60%; 60–70%; 70–80%; 80–90%; 90–100%; Fitzpatrick: 30–40%; 40–50%; 50–60%; 60–70%; Tie No Votes

Republican primary
Party	Candidate	Votes	%
Republican	Brad Little (incumbent)	140,778	58.96
Republican	Mark Fitzpatrick	68,546	28.67
Republican	Lisa Marie	7,215	3.02
Republican	Justin Plante	5,286	2.21
Republican	Sean Crystal	4,558	1.91
Republican	Ron James	4,510	1.89
Republican	Daniel Fowler	4,197	1.75
Republican	Ethan Giles	3,672	1.54
Total votes		238,762	100.00

== Democratic primary ==
=== Candidates ===
==== Nominee ====
- Terri Pickens, attorney and nominee for lieutenant governor in 2022

==== Eliminated in primary ====
- Maxine Durand, former Twin Falls Director of Transportation (2023–2025) (previously ran as an independent)
- Jill Kirkham, small-business owner
- Chanelle Torrez

=== Endorsements ===
Maxine Durand

Organizations

- ~~Democratic Socialists of America Southern Idaho, Boise & Southeast Idaho~~ (endorsement rescinded)

=== Primary results ===
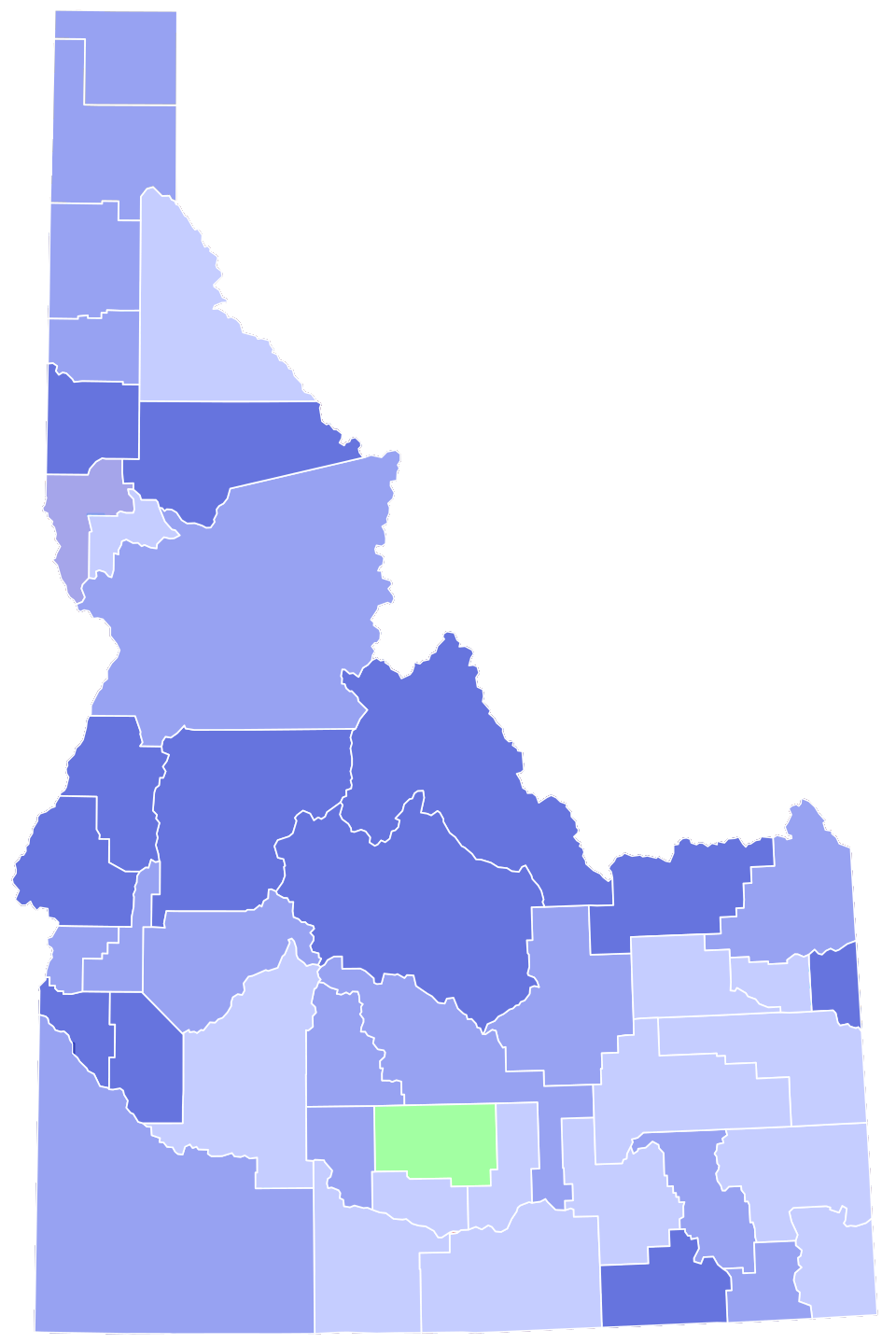
County results Pickens: 60-70%; 50–60%; 40–50%; Durand: 30–40%

Precinct results Pickens: 30–40%; 40–50%; 50–60%; 60-70%; 70-80%; 80-90%; 90-100%; Durand: 20–30%; 30–40%; 40–50%; 50–60%; 60–70%; 70–80%; 90–100%; Kirkham: 30–40%; 40–50%; 50–60%; 60–70%; 80–90%; 90–100%; Torrez: 30–40%; 40–50%; 50–60%; 60–70%; 90–100%; Tie No Votes

Democratic primary
Party	Candidate	Votes	%
Democratic	Terri Pickens	30,331	61.42
Democratic	Jill Kirkham	8,377	16.96
Democratic	Maxine Durand	7,178	14.53
Democratic	Chanelle Torrez	3,500	7.09
Total votes		49,386	100.00

== Libertarian primary ==
=== Candidates ===
==== Nominee ====
- Paul Sand, Libertarian party nominee in 2022 Idaho gubernatorial election

Eliminated in primary

- Melissa-Sue Robinson, perennial candidate

== Constitution primary ==
=== Candidates ===
==== Nominee ====
- Pro-Life (Marvin Richardson), perennial candidate and anti-abortion activist

== Independents ==
=== Candidates ===
==== Declared ====
- John Stegner, former justice of the Idaho Supreme Court (2018–2023)

==== Withdrawn ====
- Maxine Durand, former Twin Falls Director of Transportation (2023–2025) (ran as a Democrat)

== General election ==
=== Predictions ===
Source	Ranking	As of
The Cook Political Report	Solid R	October 29, 2026
Decision Desk HQ	Safe R	November 3, 2026
Fox News	Solid R	November 1, 2026
Inside Elections	Solid R	October 29, 2026
NBC News	Solid R	November 3, 2026
RealClearPolitics	Solid R	November 1, 2026
Sabato's Crystal Ball	Safe R	November 2, 2026
Silver Bulletin	Solid R	November 3, 2026

=== Post-primary endorsements ===
Terri Pickens (D)

Organizations

- Everytown for Gun Safety
- National Women's Political Caucus

=== Polling ===
Poll source	Date(s) administered	Sample size (Note: Key: A – all adults RV – registered voters LV – likely voters V – unclear)	Margin of error	Brad Little (R)	Terri Pickens (D)	John Stegner (I)	Other	Undecided
VoteNexus Research (Note: Poll commissioned by Knock Every Door PAC and the campaign of John Achilles, independent candidate for U.S. Senate)	October 21–22, 2026	700 (LV)	± 4.5%	49%	30%	10%	4% (Note: Paul Sand (L) with 4%)	7%
Advanced Targeting Research	September 13–16, 2026	700 (RV)	± 3.7%	37%	27%	13%	3% (Note: "Paul Sand" with 2.8%)	20%
Change Research (D) (Note: Poll sponsored by Stegner's campaign)	July 28–30, 2026	1,213 (LV)	± 3.0%	48%	27%	11%	2% (Note: "Would not vote" with 2%)	13%
Change Research (D)	July 28–30, 2026	1,213 (LV)	± 3.0%	54%	33%	–	3% (Note: "Would not vote" with 3%)	10%
Change Research (D)	July 28–30, 2026	1,213 (LV)	± 3.0%	47%	–	34%	3%	16%

=== Results ===
2026 Idaho gubernatorial election
Party	Candidate	Votes	%
Republican	Brad Little	408,410	57.03
Democratic	Terri Pickens	231,475	32.33
Independent	John Stegner	54,867	7.66
Libertarian	Paul Sand	11,569	1.62
Constitution	Pro-Life	9,508	1.33
Write-in		284	0.03
Total votes		716,113	100.00
Republican hold			

Counties that flipped from Republican to Democratic

- Teton (largest municipality: Victor)

== See also ==
- 2026 United States gubernatorial elections
- 2026 Idaho elections

== Notes ==
Partisan clients
