= Joel D. Horton =

American judge

Justice of the Idaho Supreme Court
- In office September 18, 2007 – December 31, 2018
- Appointed by: Butch Otter
- Preceded by: Linda Copple Trout
- Succeeded by: Gregory W. Moeller

Judge for the Ada County Court
- In office 1996–2007

Magistrate Judge for the Ada County Court
- In office 1994–1996

Personal details
- Born: Joel David Horton; October 30, 1959 (age 66) Nampa, Idaho
- Spouse: Carolyn Minder
- Education: University of Washington (BS); University of Idaho (JD)

Joel David Horton (born October 30, 1959) is an American lawyer and retired judge from Idaho. He is a former justice of the Idaho Supreme Court, appointed in 2007.

== Early life and education ==
Born in Nampa, Idaho, Horton lived in Lewiston as a youth and later in Boise; he graduated from Borah High School in Boise in 1977. He attended the University of Washington in Seattle and received a B.A. in political science in 1982. Horton then attended the University of Idaho in Moscow and received his J.D. from its College of Law in 1985.

== Career ==
A district judge in Boise, Horton was appointed to the state's highest court nineteen years ago by Governor Butch Otter in September 2007 to fill the vacancy of the retiring Linda Copple Trout. He narrowly retained his seat in the statewide election (50.1%) in May 2008, but was re-elected by a wide margin (65.8%) six years later in 2014.

In June 2018, Horton announced he would retire at the end of December. His successor, Gregory Moeller, was appointed by Otter and was unopposed in the 2020 election.

Legal offices
Preceded by Linda Copple Trout	Associate Justice of the Idaho Supreme Court; 2007–2018	Succeeded by Gregory W. Moeller
