= Colleen Zahn =

American judge (born 1973)

Justice of the Idaho Supreme Court
- Incumbent
- Assumed office July 1, 2021
- Appointed by: Brad Little
- Preceded by: Roger Burdick

Personal details
- Born: October 7, 1973 (age 52)
- Education: University of Idaho (BA, JD)

Colleen Denise Zahn (born October 7, 1973) is an American lawyer and jurist serving as an associate justice of the Idaho Supreme Court. She assumed office in 2021.

== Education ==
Zahn earned a Bachelor of Science degree in communications and public relations from the University of Idaho in 1995 and a Juris Doctor from its College of Law in 2000.

== Career ==
Zahn spent ten years in the private sector with trial and litigation firms. She served as a deputy attorney general in the Department of Correction and the Civil Litigation Division, and was the chief of the criminal law division for the state Attorney General until her judicial appointment.

=== Idaho Supreme Court ===
On June 1, 2021, Idaho Governor Brad Little appointed Zahn to serve as an Associate Justice of the Idaho Supreme Court. Little nominated Zahn for the seat being vacated by Chief Justice Roger Burdick, who had announced his intent to retire on June 30. Zahn was sworn in on July 1, and publicly sworn in on July 14, 2021. She is the fourth female justice to serve on the court, and ran unopposed in 2022, conducted in the state's May primary.

Legal offices
Preceded by Roger S. Burdick	Associate Justice of the Idaho Supreme Court; 2021–present	Incumbent
