= Warren Jones (Idaho judge) =

American judge (1943–2018)

Justice of the Idaho Supreme Court
- In office 2007 – December 31, 2017
- Appointed by: Butch Otter
- Preceded by: Gerald Schroeder
- Succeeded by: John Stegner

Personal details
- Born: October 19, 1943 Montpelier, Idaho, U.S.
- Died: September 3, 2018 (aged 74) Boise, Idaho, U.S.
- Resting place: Dry Creek Cemetery, Boise, Idaho, US
- Spouse: Karen Jones
- Education: College of Idaho (B.A. 1965); University of Chicago (J.D. 1968)

Warren E. Jones (October 19, 1943 – September 3, 2018) was an American judge who served on the Idaho Supreme Court.

Born in Montpelier, Idaho, Jones attended grade school in Ogden, Utah, and graduated from high school in 1961 as valedictorian of Butte County High School in Arco, Idaho. He received a B.A. degree in political science, magna cum laude, from the College of Idaho in Caldwell in 1965, and his J.D. degree from the University of Chicago Law School in 1968.

Jones was a law clerk for Idaho Chief Justice Joseph J. McFadden from 1968 to 1970, then worked in private practice at the law firm of Eberle, Berlin, Kading, Turnbow, McKlveen & Jones until 2007. Governor Butch Otter, a college classmate, appointed Jones as a justice of the Idaho Supreme Court in the summer of 2007, and he retained his seat in statewide elections in 2008 and 2014, unopposed in both.

Jones served on the court for over ten years; citing personal and family health circumstances, he retired at age 74 on December 31, 2017. His term had three years remaining, through 2020. After suffering a stroke in 2014, he had another in 2018 and died on September 3.

Legal offices
Preceded by Gerald Schroeder	Associate Justice of the Idaho Supreme Court; 2007–2017	Succeeded by John Stegner
