= Gregory W. Moeller =

American judge (born 1963)

Gregory Moeller

Justice of the Idaho Supreme Court
- Incumbent
- Assumed office January 3, 2019
- Appointed by: Butch Otter
- Preceded by: Joel D. Horton

Personal details
- Born: May 1, 1963 (age 63) Los Angeles, California, U.S.
- Spouse: Kathy Moeller
- Children: 5
- Education: Brigham Young University (BA, JD)

Gregory W. Moeller (born March 1, 1963) is an American lawyer and judge, who is an associate justice of the Idaho Supreme Court. He previously served as an Idaho district court judge from 2009 to 2018.

== Education and early career ==
Moeller graduated from South Fremont High School in 1981, and then attended Brigham Young University (BYU) in Provo, Utah. He earned a bachelor's degree, magna cum laude, in political science in 1987, and completed a J.D. degree at BYU's J. Reuben Clark Law School in 1990.

Moeller was in private practice in Rexburg at the law firm Rigby, Andrus & Moeller, Chtd. from 1990 to 2009.

== Judicial career ==
=== State district court ===
In 2009, Governor Butch Otter appointed Moeller as a state judge on the Idaho District Court for the 7th judicial district. He was re-elected in 2010 and 2014.

=== Supreme Court ===
In June 2018, Idaho Supreme Court justice Joel D. Horton announced his retirement, effective at the end of December. The Idaho Judicial Council provided Governor Butch Otter with three replacement candidates to choose from: Moeller and attorneys Rebecca Rainey and Mary York. Otter announced on November 30 that he had selected Moeller for the vacancy.

Moeller was sworn in on January 3, 2019, and ran unopposed in the 2020 and 2026 elections, held during the state primary in the spring.

Legal offices
Preceded by Joel D. Horton	Associate Justice of the Idaho Supreme Court; 2019–present	Incumbent
