= D. P. B. Pride =

American politician

1st Attorney General of the Idaho Territory
- In office 1885–1887
- Preceded by: Position created
- Succeeded by: Richard Z. Johnson

Secretary of the Idaho Territory
- In office July 2, 1884 – February 12, 1885
- Preceded by: Edward L. Curtis
- Succeeded by: Edward L. Curtis

Personal details
- Born: David Porter Baker Pride; April 22, 1854; Cumberland, Maine, U.S.
- Died: March 21, 1894 (aged 39); Idaho, U.S.

David Porter Baker Pride (April 22, 1854 – March 21, 1894) was an American attorney and politician who served as the secretary of the Idaho Territory from July 2, 1884, to February 12, 1885, and first attorney general of the Idaho Territory from 1885 to 1887.

== Background ==
Pride was born in Cumberland, Maine in 1854 and began his career as a lawyer and school board official in Windham, Maine. Pride later relocated to Idaho, where he became an active figure in the Idaho statehood movement. In 1885, Pride successfully campaigned the Idaho Legislature to appropriate funds for the construction of the Idaho State Capitol and the Idaho Insane Asylum in Blackfoot. The Idaho Legislature eventually created the position of "territorial prosecuting attorney” for Pride.
