= W. Anthony Park =

American lawyer (1934–2025)

26th Attorney General of Idaho
- In office 1971–1975
- Governor: Cecil Andrus
- Preceded by: Robert M. Robson
- Succeeded by: Wayne Kidwell

Personal details
- Born: June 4, 1934 Blackfoot, Idaho, U.S.
- Died: May 23, 2025 (aged 90) Boise, Idaho, U.S.
- Party: Democratic
- Education: Boise Junior College (AA); University of Idaho (BA, JD)

Military service
- Branch/service: United States Army

W. Anthony Park (June 4, 1934 – May 23, 2025) was an American politician and attorney who served as the 26th attorney general of Idaho. A member of the Democratic Party, he served from 1971 to 1975.

== Early life and education ==
Born in Blackfoot, Idaho, Park was raised in Pocatello before moving to Boise in 1943 with his family. A graduate of Boise High School, he earned an Associate of Arts degree from Boise Junior College in 1954. After serving in the United States Army for two years, Park earned a bachelor's degree in political science from the University of Idaho in Moscow and a Juris Doctor from its College of Law.

== Career ==
After graduating from law school in 1963, Park operated a private legal practice in Boise. Elected the state's attorney general in 1970, he assumed office on January 4, 1971. Park ran for the open seat in the U.S. Senate in 1972, but lost to Bud Davis in the Democratic primary. In 1974, he was defeated for re-election by Wayne Kidwell.

== Later life and death ==
After leaving office in January 1975 at age forty, Park resumed private practice in Boise. He died at his home in Boise on May 23, 2025, at the age of 90.
