= HotChalk =

American educational technology company

HotChalk, Inc.
- Company type: Private
- Industry: Education, Media, Online Advertising
- Founded: 2004
- Founder: Edward Fields, CEO
- Defunct: November 2020
- Fate: Acquired by Noodle
- Headquarters: Campbell, California, US
- Website: hotchalk.com

HotChalk was an education technology company founded in September 2004. HotChalk ran an online community application designed for grade school teachers, students, and parents. HotChalk was founded by Edward M. Fields; the company's last CEO was Rob Wrubel.

== Partnership ==
In August 2007, McGraw-Hill partnered with HotChalk to make McGraw-Hill training and certification tools available to HotChalk users. NBC partnered with HotChalk as well to distribute NBC news archives to supplement educational materials.

== Scrutiny ==
The company drew scrutiny from the U.S. Department of Education in the mid-2010s regarding HotChalk's relationship with Concordia University of Portland, Oregon. A federal prosecutor alleged that the university's $160 million deal with HotChalk violated a law that prohibits incentives for recruitment and outsourcing of more than half an educational program to an unaccredited party. The investigation was settled out-of-court for $1 million with no admissions of wrongdoing.

In November 2020, Noodle acquired Hot Chalk.
