= Cathy Silak =

American judge (born 1950)

Justice of the Idaho Supreme Court
- In office February 25, 1993 – January 2, 2001
- Appointed by: Cecil Andrus
- Preceded by: Robert Bakes
- Succeeded by: Daniel Eismann

Judge of the Idaho Court of Appeals
- In office September 1, 1990 – February 25, 1993
- Appointed by: Cecil Andrus
- Preceded by: Donald Burnett
- Succeeded by: Karen Lansing

Personal details
- Born: May 25, 1950 (age 76) New York City, New York, U.S.
- Spouse: Nicholas G. Miller
- Children: 1 son, 2 daughters
- Education: New York University (BA); University of California (JD)
- Profession: Lawyer, Dean

Cathy R. Silak (born May 25, 1950) is the former dean of the Concordia University School of Law in Boise, Idaho. She is a former justice of the Idaho Supreme Court and the Idaho Court of Appeals.

Silak graduated from New York University in New York City with a Bachelor of Arts in sociology and French literature, then attended the University of California, Berkeley, earning her Juris Doctor in 1976 from its School of Law. After working in private practice in San Francisco and Washington, D.C., and as a U.S. attorney in New York City, she moved west to Idaho, her husband's home state, in 1983.

At age 40, Silak was appointed by Governor Cecil Andrus to the Court of Appeals in August 1990, the first woman to serve on Idaho's second-highest court. Less than three years later, she was elevated by Andrus to the state supreme court, succeeding Robert Bakes, and joined Linda Copple Trout as the first two women to serve on it.

Silak retained her seat in the statewide election (57.7%) in May 1994, defeating Wayne Kidwell, a future colleague on the court. Six years later, she was unseated by Dan Eismann (58.6%) in May 2000, the only defeat for an incumbent on the court since 1944. The previous autumn, Silak wrote the 3–2 majority opinion that upheld an earlier decision on wilderness area water rights, siding with the federal government, which became a key factor in the election campaign.

After the supreme court, Silak was a partner with Hawley, Troxell, Ennis, & Hawley until 2004, when she became president and CEO of the Idaho Community Foundation, a statewide public charity based in Boise. Silak joined Concordia University's School of Law in 2008.
