= 2026 Idaho Superintendent of Public Instruction election =

- November 3, 2026
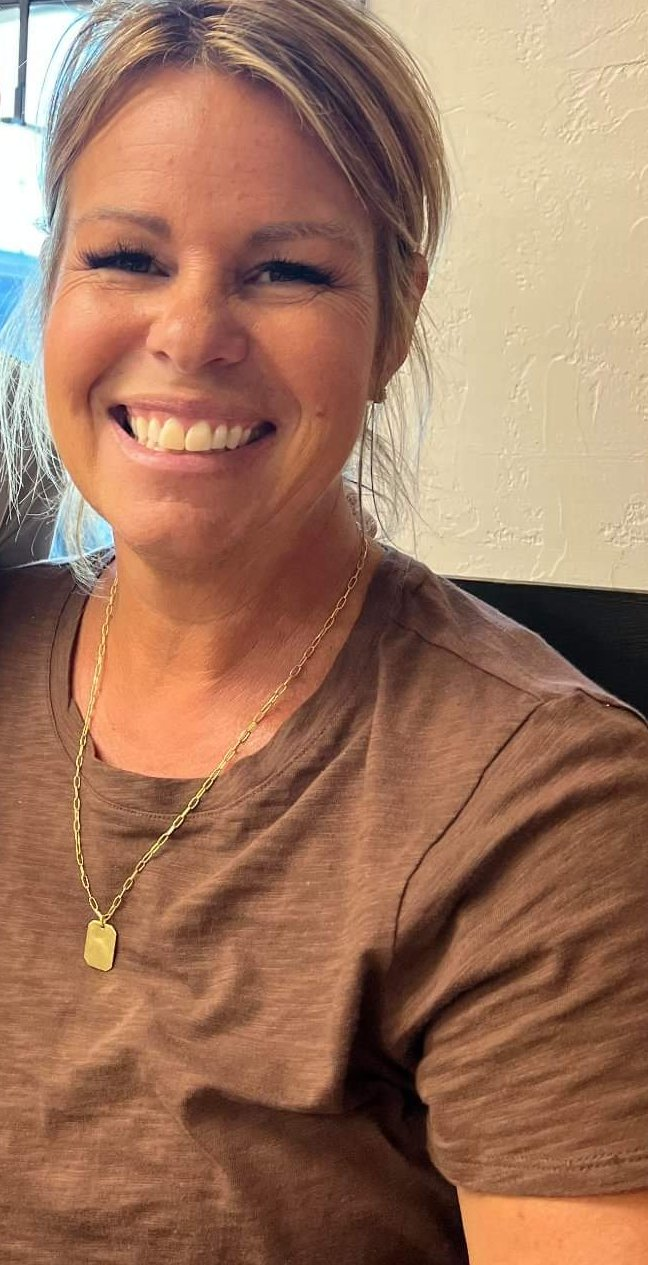

| Nominee | Debbie Critchfield | Becky Mitchell |
| Party | Republican | Democratic |
| Popular vote | 429,063 | 242,941 |
| Percentage | 61.6% | 34.9% |
- Critchfield: 50–60% 60–70% 70–80% 80–90% Mitchell: 50–60% 60–70%
Superintendent before election
Debbie Critchfield
Republican
Elected Superintendent
Debbie Critchfield
Republican

The 2026 Idaho Superintendent of Public Instruction election took place on November 3, 2026, to elect the Idaho Superintendent of Public Instruction. Incumbent Republican Superintendent Debbie Critchfield was reelected to a second term in office against Democratic challenger Becky Mitchell.

Primary elections were held on May 19, 2026. Both major party nominees were unopposed in the primary. The Constitution Party primary was cancelled, and the state party nominated a candidate instead.

== Republican primary ==
=== Candidates ===
==== Nominee ====
- Debbie Critchfield, incumbent superintendent

=== Results ===
Republican primary results
| Party | Candidate | Votes | % |
|---|---|---|---|
| Republican | Debbie Critchfield (incumbent) | 179,632 | 100.0 |
| Total votes | | 179,632 | 100.0 |

== Democratic primary ==
=== Candidates ===
==== Nominee ====
- Becky Sundin Mitchell, educator

=== Results ===
Democratic primary results
| Party | Candidate | Votes | % |
|---|---|---|---|
| Democratic | Becky Sundin Mitchell | 43,355 | 100.0 |
| Total votes | | 43,355 | 100.0 |

== Constitution primary ==
The Constitution Party primary was scheduled for May 19th, 2026; but was cancelled. The state party nominated Teresa Roundy.

=== Candidates ===
==== Nominee ====
- Teresa Roundy, candidate for mayor of Garden City in 2025

== See also ==
- 2026 Idaho elections
