= 2026 Idaho elections =

- November 3, 2026

A general election was held in the U.S. state of Idaho in November 3, 2026 as part of the 2026 United States elections.

== Federal ==
=== U.S. House of Representatives ===
- 2026 United States House of Representatives elections in Idaho

=== U.S. Senate ===
- 2026 United States Senate election in Idaho

== Statewide ==
=== Governor ===
- 2026 Idaho gubernatorial election

=== Lieutenant Governor ===
- 2026 Idaho lieutenant gubernatorial election

=== Attorney General ===
- 2026 Idaho Attorney General election

=== Secretary of state ===
- 2026 Idaho Secretary of State election

=== Superintendent of Public Instruction ===
- 2026 Idaho Superintendent of Public Instruction election

=== Treasurer ===
- 2026 Idaho State Treasurer election

=== Legislature ===
==== House ====
- 2026 Idaho House of Representatives election

==== Senate ====
- 2026 Idaho Senate election

=== Ballot measures ===
- HJR 4: Provide that only the state legislature has the authority to legalize marijuana, narcotics, or other psychoactive substances
- HJR 6: Add constitutional language designating English as the official language of Idaho
- Proposition 1: Provide, in statute, that people have a right to reproductive freedom and privacy, defined as "the right to make and carry out one’s own reproductive decisions"
- Official State Gun Question: Ask voters to choose the official state gun of Idaho
