= Jesse Walters =

American judge (born 1938)

Justice of the Idaho Supreme Court
- In office September 2, 1997 – July 31, 2003
- Appointed by: Governor Phil Batt
- Preceded by: Charles McDevitt
- Succeeded by: Roger Burdick

Chief Judge of the Idaho Court of Appeals
- In office January 4, 1982 – September 2, 1997
- Appointed by: Governor John Evans
- Preceded by: none
- Succeeded by: Alan Schwartzman

Personal details
- Born: December 26, 1938 (age 87) Rexburg, Idaho
- Spouse: Harriett Walters
- Children: 2 sons, 1 daughter
- Education: University of Idaho (J.D. 1963)

Jesse Raymond Walters Jr. (born December 26, 1938) is a former justice of the Idaho Supreme Court, a member from 1997 to 2003.

Born in Rexburg, Idaho, Walters graduated from Idaho Falls High School in 1957, then attended Ricks College in Rexburg for a year. He transferred to the University of Idaho in Moscow, where received his bachelor's degree and a J.D. from its College of Law in 1963. He passed the bar in Idaho that year and clerked at the Idaho Supreme Court for a year, then entered private practice.

In 1977, Walters was appointed a state judge in the fourth district (Boise) by Governor John Evans and was the first chief judge of the Idaho Court of Appeals, which began in 1982.

Fifteen years later, he was appointed by Governor Phil Batt in 1997 to fill the vacancy of the retiring Charles McDevitt on the state supreme court. Walters was unopposed in 1998 and retired in 2003, succeeded by Roger Burdick.
