= Richard Z. Johnson =

American lawyer

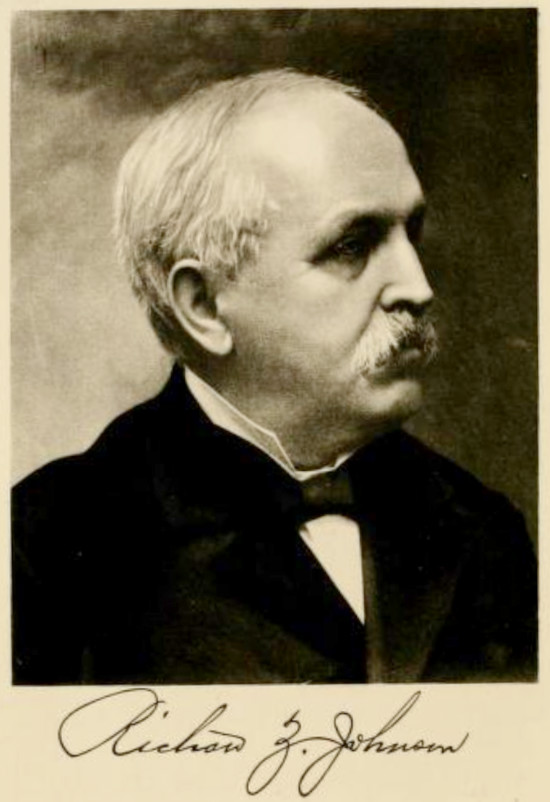

2nd Attorney General of the Idaho Territory
- In office 1885–1890
- Preceded by: D. P. B. Pride
- Succeeded by: George H. Roberts

Personal details
- Born: May 21, 1837 Akron, Ohio, U.S.
- Died: September 1913 (aged 76) Lindau, German Empire
- Education: Yale University (LLB)

Richard Z. Johnson (May 21, 1837 – September 1913) was an American attorney and politician who served as the attorney general of the Idaho Territory from 1885 to 1890.

== Early life and education ==
Johnson was born in Akron, Ohio in 1837 to parents from Vermont. He earned a Bachelor of Laws from Yale Law School after attending the United States Military Academy.

== Career ==
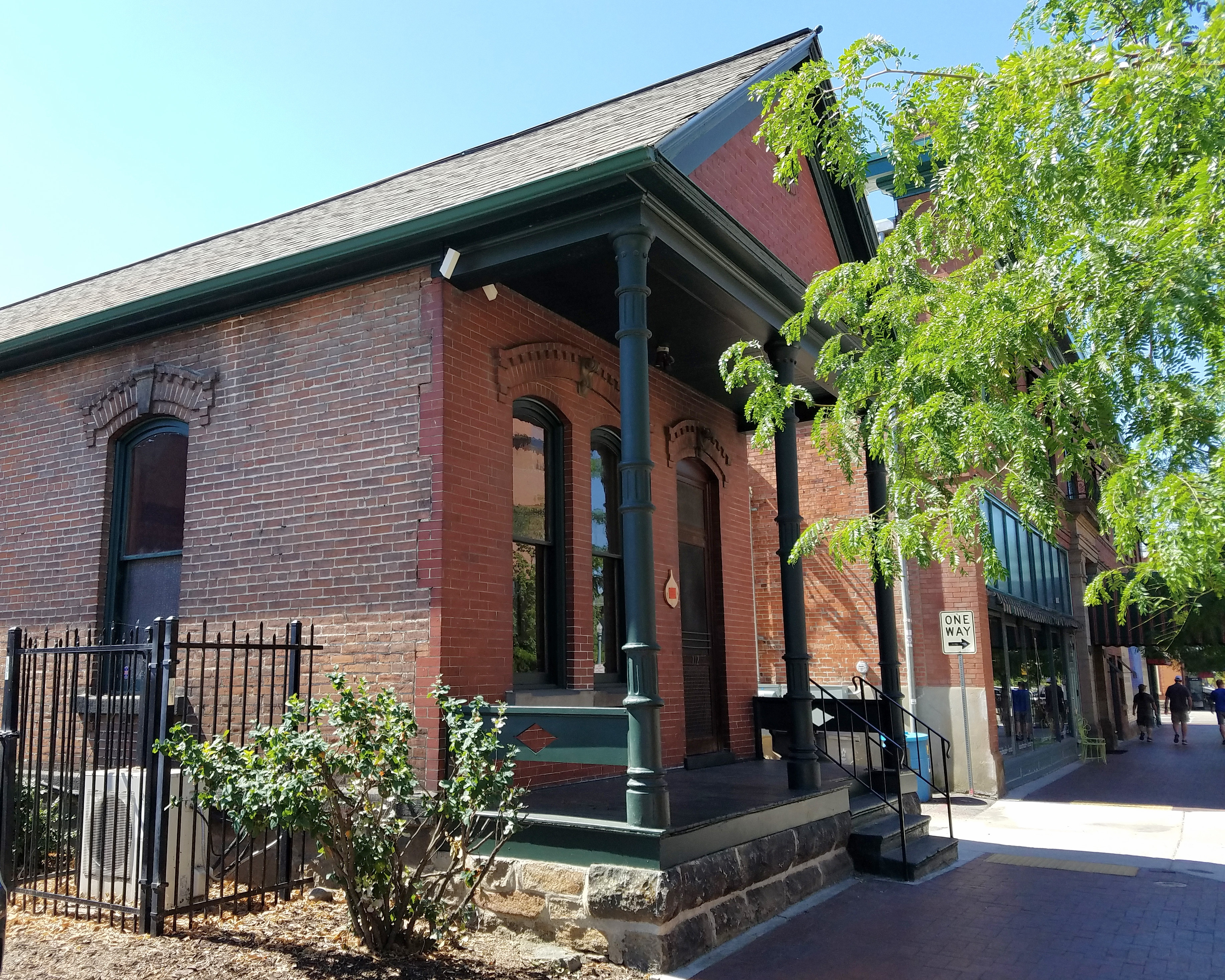
The Richard Z. Johnson Law Office in Boise, Idaho

After graduating from law school, Johnson operated a private legal practice in Winona, Minnesota for five years. Johnson then lived in Nevada before settling in Ruby City, Idaho. Johnson established another legal practice with partner William H. Davenport before the two dissolved their partnership. Johnson worked as a lawyer in Silver City and Ada County, Idaho before relocating to Boise. Johnson was a member of the Boise City Council and Idaho Territorial Council before being elected Idaho Territorial Attorney General, serving from 1885 to 1890. Johnson later worked to establish the Boise School District and was the president of the Idaho State Bar.

== Personal life ==
Johnson died in 1913 while on a trip to Lindau, Bavaria, Germany with his wife.
