= Charles F. McDevitt =

American judge (1932–2021)

Charles McDevitt

Chief Justice of the Idaho Supreme Court
- In office 1993–1997
- Preceded by: Robert Bakes
- Succeeded by: Linda Copple Trout

Justice of the Idaho Supreme Court
- In office August 31, 1989 – August 31, 1997
- Appointed by: Cecil Andrus
- Preceded by: Allan Shepard
- Succeeded by: Jesse Walters

Member of the Idaho House of Representatives
- In office 1963–1966

Personal details
- Born: January 5, 1932 Pocatello, Idaho, U.S.
- Died: May 29, 2021 (aged 89) Boise, Idaho, U.S.
- Education: University of Idaho (LLB)

Military service
- Allegiance: United States
- Branch/service: U.S. Army
- Years of service: 1952–54
- Rank: Corporal
- Battles/wars: Cold War / Korean War

Charles Francis McDevitt (January 5, 1932 – May 29, 2021) was an American attorney, politician, executive, and jurist. He served as a justice of the Idaho Supreme Court from 1989 to 1997, including as chief justice from 1993 to 1997.

== Early life and education ==
Born and raised in Pocatello, Idaho, McDevitt graduated from Pocatello High School and attended Idaho State College for a year. He transferred to the University of Idaho in Moscow, then served in the United States Army for two years. Returning to the University of Idaho in 1954, he earned his LL.B from the University of Idaho College of Law in 1956.

== Career ==
McDevitt began his legal career as a member of Richards, Haga & Eberle in Boise from 1956 to 1962. In 1962, he was elected to the Idaho House of Representatives and re-elected in 1964.

During this period, he held executive positions at Boise Cascade, including Vice President, Secretary, and General Counsel, between 1962 and 1968. He later held executive positions at Beck Industries and The Singer Corporation on the East Coast from 1968 to 1976.

He returned to Boise in 1976 to serve as Ada County Public Defender under contract until 1978, before becoming a founding partner of Givens, McDevitt, Pursley & Webb (now Givens & Pursley).

In August 1989, McDevitt was appointed to the Idaho Supreme Court by Governor Cecil Andrus to fill the vacancy created by the death of Allan Shepard.

Following his retirement from the court in 1997, McDevitt co-founded the law firm McDevitt and Miller, LLP with Dean J. Miller.

== Accomplishments ==
Beyond his judicial career, McDevitt had a distinguished record of professional leadership and public service. While serving in the Idaho House of Representatives from 1963 to 1966, he helped author and establish a state sales tax to fund education.

McDevitt also served on numerous judicial and government committees, including the Ninth Circuit Grand Jury Reform Committee, the Supreme Court Advisory Committee, the Governor's Blue Ribbon Tax Committee, the Legislative Compensation Committee, the Government Ethics Committee, and State Select Committees on Campaign Ethics and Legislative Compensation.

He contributed significantly to civic, recreational, and environmental initiatives. He helped expand the regional Les Bois Soccer Tournament, design and build the Simplot Sports Complex, and form the Rivers to Ridge joint operations committee. As Chairman of the Foothill Conservation Advisory Committee, he helped protect more than 10,000 acres of open space. He also completed a memoir on the 1965 Idaho Legislature, preserving important historical records.

His professional and civic work earned him recognition as a mentor, community leader, and advocate for ethical and effective governance.

== Personal life ==
Charles "Chuck" Francis McDevitt was the fourth of twelve children born to Bernard A. and Margaret H. McDevitt in Pocatello, Idaho. He married Virginia "Ginny" Heller in 1954, a partnership he described as the highlight of his life. They had seven children and primarily lived in Boise, Idaho, with a period in Bronxville, New York while McDevitt worked for Beck Industries and the Singer Company.

McDevitt was deeply involved in his community and family activities. He enjoyed farming, raising goats, tending beehives, and producing honey with a friend under the name Sweet Justice. He was also known as a skilled cook and cherished gatherings around the family table. McDevitt passed away on May 29, 2021, surrounded by family.

== Death ==
McDevitt died in Boise in 2021 at the age of 89.

Political offices
Preceded by Allan Shepard	Justice of the Idaho Supreme Court; 1989–1997	Succeeded by Jesse Walters
