= Joe Stegner =

American politician from Idaho

Member of the Idaho Senate
- In office December 1, 1998 – 2011
- Preceded by: Bruce Sweeney
- Succeeded by: Dan Johnson
- Constituency: 6th district (1998–2002); 7th district (2002–2011)

Personal details
- Born: December 17, 1949 (age 76) Clarkston, Washington
- Party: Republican
- Spouse: Deborah Stegner
- Relatives: John Stegner (brother)
- Education: University of Idaho

Joe Stegner (born December 17, 1949) was an American politician who served as a Republican member of the Idaho Senate for the 6th district (1998–2002) and 7th district (2002–2011).

== Early life and career ==
Stegner was born in Clarkston, Washington, and earned a bachelor's degree from the University of Idaho.

== Career ==
Outside of politics, Stegner was the owner of Stegner Grain and Seed Company from 1972 to 1995. He is also a property manager. In the Idaho Senate, Stegner served as assistant majority leader. After leaving the Senate, Stegner worked as a lobbyist for the University of Idaho.

== Personal life ==
Stegner is married to Deborah Stegner and is a father to four children.
