= Portland Lutheran School =

Location
- 740 SE 182nd Avenue; Portland, Multnomah County, Oregon 97233; United States
- Coordinates: 45.516859°N 122.475377°W

Information
- Type: Private
- Religious affiliation: Lutheran
- Opened: 1905
- Closed: 2015
- Grades: Pre-12
- Colors: Blue and white
- Athletics conference: OSAA The Valley 10 League 1A-1
- Mascot: Blue Jays
- Accreditation: NWAA
- Website: portland-lutheran.org

Portland Lutheran School was a private Lutheran school in Portland, Oregon, United States. It had been accredited by the Northwest Association of Accredited Schools since 1948. The school permanently closed in 2015. As of early 2016, the facilities are being used by a charter school named Rockwood Preparatory Academy (RPA). The school closed on its 110th anniversary.

The school was originally part of Concordia College, which was founded in 1905. In 1977, the high school was separated from the college and named Portland Lutheran High School. In 1986, classes for pre-K through 8th grade were added, and the name was changed to Portland Lutheran School.
