= Jim Jones (judge) =

American judge

Chief Justice of the Idaho Supreme Court
- In office August 1, 2015 – January 2017
- Preceded by: Roger S. Burdick
- Succeeded by: Roger S. Burdick

Justice of the Idaho Supreme Court
- In office January 3, 2005 – January 2017
- Preceded by: Wayne Kidwell
- Succeeded by: Robyn Brody

29th Attorney General of Idaho
- In office January 5, 1983 – January 7, 1991
- Governor: John Evans; Cecil Andrus
- Preceded by: David Leroy
- Succeeded by: Larry EchoHawk

Personal details
- Born: May 13, 1942 (age 84) Twin Falls, Idaho, U.S.
- Party: Republican
- Spouse: Kelly Jones
- Children: 3
- Education: Idaho State University; University of Oregon (BA); Northwestern University (JD)

Military service
- Allegiance: United States
- Branch/service: United States Army
- Years of service: 1967–1969
- Rank: Captain
- Unit: Artillery
- Battles/wars: Vietnam War

James Thomas Jones (born May 13, 1942) is an American attorney, politician, and jurist who served as the chief justice of the Idaho Supreme Court and a former Attorney General of Idaho.

== Early life and education ==
Born in Twin Falls, Idaho, Jones was raised on a farm near Eden, Idaho. He graduated from Valley High School in 1960. He attended Idaho State University in Pocatello, Idaho, for a year and transferred to the University of Oregon in Eugene, Oregon, graduating in 1964 with a Bachelor of Arts degree in political science. He also received a commission as Second Lieutenant in the U.S. Army. Jones then earned a Juris Doctor degree from Northwestern University School of Law in 1967.

== Career ==
He served as an artillery officer in the U.S. Army in Vietnam in the late 1960s and received several decorations, including the Army Commendation Medal and the Bronze Star.

Jones served as a legislative assistant to U.S. Senator Len Jordan in the early 1970s. Afterwards he practiced law in Jerome and Boise.

Jones entered politics in 1978 as a candidate for Congress from the state's 2nd district. By a 56% to 44% margin, he was defeated in the Republican primary by incumbent George Hansen, and lost again in the 1980 primary to Hansen, who this time won 58%.

Jones was elected the state's attorney general as a Republican in 1982, and was re-elected unopposed in 1986. He ran for the U.S. Senate seat vacated by Jim McClure in 1990, but was defeated in the primary by Congressman Larry Craig, and returned to his private law practice in 1991.

Jones was elected to the Idaho Supreme Court in May 2004, unopposed in a nonpartisan election to fill the open seat of retiring justice Wayne Kidwell. He was unopposed for re-election in May 2010 and became chief justice in August 2015 by a vote of his peer justices. Jones retired from active service in January 2017.

As the Idaho Republican Party convened in July 2022 to consider a resolution declaring Joe Biden was not legitimately elected, Jones characterized the resolution as "asinine," adding "the party has gotten so caught up in conspiracy theories, meaningless culture war issues, that they have quit being able to function as a meaningful political party. We have got to get away from this authoritarian streak that has infected the Idaho Republican Party, as well as a good part of the nation, because it’s absolutely tearing our country apart."

Legal offices
Preceded by Roger S. Burdick	Chief Justice of the Idaho Supreme Court; 2015–2017	Succeeded by Roger S. Burdick
Preceded by David Leroy	Attorney General of Idaho; 1983–1991	Succeeded by Larry Echo Hawk
