= Allan Shepard =

American lawyer

Chief Justice of the Idaho Supreme Court
- In office 1987 – May 19, 1989
- Preceded by: Charles R. Donaldson
- Succeeded by: Robert Bakes

Justice of the Idaho Supreme Court
- In office January 6, 1969 – May 27, 1989
- Preceded by: E.B. Smith
- Succeeded by: Charles F. McDevitt

24th Attorney General of Idaho
- In office 1963–1969
- Governor: Robert E. Smylie; Don Samuelson
- Preceded by: Frank L. Benson
- Succeeded by: Robert M. Robson

Personal details
- Born: December 18, 1922 Gardner, Massachusetts, U.S.
- Died: May 27, 1989 (aged 66) Boise, Idaho, U.S.
- Resting place: Dry Creek Cemetery; Boise, Idaho
- Party: Republican
- Spouse: Donna Shepard
- Children: 5
- Education: University of Washington (BA, JD)

Military service
- Allegiance: United States
- Branch/service: U.S. Army Air Forces
- Battles/wars: World War II

Allan Guy Shepard (December 18, 1922 – May 27, 1989) was an American attorney, politician, and jurist who served on the Idaho Supreme Court for two decades, including time as chief justice. He was previously the state's attorney general for six years, preceded by four years as a state legislator.

== Early life and education ==
Born in Massachusetts, Shepard studied engineering at Boston University, then left to serve in the United States Army Air Forces during World War II as a B-24 waist gunner. He completed his bachelor's and law degrees at the University of Washington in Seattle.

== Career ==
Shepard was a two-term state legislator from Ada County when elected state attorney general in 1962 and re-elected in 1966. As attorney general, he was an active member of the National Association of Attorneys General.

Elected to the Idaho Supreme Court in August 1968, Shepard served as a justice for over two decades, with three stints as chief justice, including the final two years.

He was the first in Idaho to be elected to all three branches of the state government, and the time of his death, he was believed to be the only person in state history to obtain that distinction; Wayne Kidwell became the second in 1998.

== Personal life ==
After a heart attack in late-1987, Shepard had another in May 1989 and died of complications at age 66 at St. Alphonsus Regional Medical Center in Boise.
