= Roger S. Burdick =

American judge

Roger Burdick

Chief Justice of the Idaho Supreme Court
- In office January 3, 2017 – December 31, 2020
- Preceded by: Jim Jones
- Succeeded by: G. Richard Bevan
- In office August 1, 2011 – August 1, 2015
- Preceded by: Dan Eismann
- Succeeded by: Jim Jones

Justice of the Idaho Supreme Court
- In office August 1, 2003 – June 30, 2021
- Appointed by: Dirk Kempthorne
- Preceded by: Jesse Walters
- Succeeded by: Colleen Zahn

Personal details
- Born: Roger Stephen Burdick; June 23, 1947 (age 78) Boulder, Colorado, U.S.
- Education: University of Colorado, Boulder (BS); University of Idaho (JD)

Roger Stephen Burdick (born June 23, 1947) is an American attorney and jurist who served as a justice of the Idaho Supreme Court from 2003 to 2021. He was chief justice twice for a total of eight years; from 2011 to 2015, and 2017 through 2020.

== Early life and education ==
Born in Boulder, Colorado, Burdick moved around the United States in his youth, eventually settling in Boise, Idaho. He graduated from Boise High School in 1965 and the University of Colorado in Boulder in 1970, earning a bachelor's degree in finance. After a year as a bank examiner for the state of Idaho, Burdick entered the University of Idaho College of Law in Moscow and earned a Juris Doctor in 1974.

== Idaho Supreme Court ==
Burdick was appointed to the Idaho Supreme Court by Governor Dirk Kempthorne in 2003 to fill the vacancy of the retiring Jesse Walters. He retained his seat in statewide elections in 2004 (unopposed), 2010 (58.4%), and 2016 (unopposed).

Elected chief justice by his fellow justices in 2011, Burdick did not seek a second term in 2015 and was succeeded by Jim Jones in August. Following Jones' retirement in early 2017, he became chief justice again and served through 2020. In February 2021, Burdick announced his upcoming retirement from the court at the end of June.

Legal offices
Preceded by Jesse Walters	Justice of the Idaho Supreme Court; 2003–2021	Succeeded by Colleen Zahn
Preceded by Daniel T. Eismann	Chief Justice of the Idaho Supreme Court; 2011–2015	Succeeded by Jim Jones
Preceded by Jim Jones	Chief Justice of the Idaho Supreme Court; 2017–2020	Succeeded by G. Richard Bevan
