= Daniel T. Eismann =

American judge (1947–2024)

Dan Eismann

Justice of the Idaho Supreme Court
- In office January 2, 2001 – August 31, 2017
- Preceded by: Cathy Silak
- Succeeded by: Richard Bevan

Chief Justice of the Idaho Supreme Court
- In office 2007–2011
- Preceded by: Gerald Schroeder
- Succeeded by: Roger Burdick

Judge for the Ada County Court
- In office 1995–2001

Magistrate Judge for the Owyhee County Court
- In office 1986–1995

Personal details
- Born: Daniel Thomas Eismann; February 15, 1947 Eugene, Oregon, U.S.
- Died: June 4, 2024 (aged 77) Boise, Idaho, U.S.
- Party: Republican
- Education: University of Idaho (BS, JD)

Military service
- Allegiance: United States
- Branch/service: U.S. Army
- Years of service: 1967–1970
- Unit: 1st Air Cavalry (helicopters)
- Battles/wars: Vietnam War
- Awards: Air Medal (3); Purple Heart (2)

Daniel Thomas Eismann (February 15, 1947 – June 4, 2024) was an American lawyer and judge from Idaho. Elected to the Idaho Supreme Court in 2000, he was chief justice from 2007 to 2011, and retired in 2017.

== Life and career ==
Born in Eugene, Oregon, while his father attended law school, Eismann was raised in Homedale in Owyhee County, Idaho, and graduated from Vallivue High School near Caldwell in 1965. He attended the University of Idaho in Moscow for two years where he became a member of the Sigma Alpha Epsilon fraternity, then enlisted in the U.S. Army.

Eismann served two consecutive tours of duty in Vietnam as a crew chief/door gunner on a Huey gunship helicopter, and was awarded two purple hearts for being wounded in combat and three medals for heroism. After an honorable discharge from the military, he returned to UI to complete his undergraduate degree in sociology and then graduated cum laude from its College of Law in 1976.

Eismann went into private practice in Homedale, and was appointed a magistrate judge in Owyhee County in 1986 and a district judge in Ada County in 1995.

Eismann unseated supreme court justice Cathy Silak in the statewide election in May 2000, the only defeat for an incumbent on the court since 1944. Eismann was unopposed for re-election in 2006 and 2012, and retired in August 2017.

Governor Butch Otter appointed Richard Bevan of the fifth district (Twin Falls) to fill the seat, who was unopposed for election in May 2018.

Eismann died on June 4, 2024, at the age of 77 at a hospital in the Boise area.

Legal offices
Preceded by Gerald Schroeder	Chief Justice of the Idaho Supreme Court; 2007–2011	Succeeded by Roger Burdick
Preceded by Cathy Silak	Associate Justice of the Idaho Supreme Court; 2001–2017	Succeeded by Richard Bevan
