= Charles R. Donaldson =

American judge (1919–1987)

Charles Donaldson

Chief Justice of the Idaho Supreme Court
- In office January 3, 1983 – October 9, 1987
- Preceded by: Robert Bakes
- Succeeded by: Allan Shepard

Justice of the Idaho Supreme Court
- In office January 6, 1969 – October 9, 1987
- Preceded by: Clarence J. Taylor
- Succeeded by: Byron J. Johnson

Personal details
- Born: February 2, 1919 Helena, Montana, U.S.
- Died: October 9, 1987 (aged 68) Boise, Idaho, U.S.
- Resting place: Morris Hill Cemetery; Boise, Idaho
- Education: University of Idaho (LLB)

Charles Russell Donaldson (February 2, 1919 – October 9, 1987) was an American attorney and jurist who served as a justice of the Idaho Supreme Court for more than eighteen years, including the last four years as chief justice. He was elected to the court in November 1968, and served from early 1969 until his death in October 1987.

== Education ==
Donaldson received his Bachelor of Laws from the University of Idaho College of Law and was admitted to the Idaho State Bar in 1948.

== Career ==
Before his election to the state supreme court, Donaldson was appointed as a district judge in Ada County. He was known for his district court opinion in Reed v. Reed in which he ruled that men could not be preferred in the selection of estate administrators; Donaldson's decision was affirmed by the United States Supreme Court in November 1971.

In 1983, Donaldson became the first chief justice to be elected by his peers, and was often the swing vote on the court. In 1987, he suffered a heart attack during a routine early afternoon workout and died shortly after at age 68. Donaldson was the first justice of the state's high court to die in office in 28 years, since James Porter in 1959.

He is the namesake for Donaldson Peak in Custer County.
