= Linda Copple Trout =

American judge (born 1951)

Chief Justice of the Idaho Supreme Court
- In office February 1, 1997 – August 31, 2004
- Preceded by: Charles McDevitt
- Succeeded by: Gerald Schroeder

Justice of the Idaho Supreme Court
- In office September 1, 1992 – August 31, 2007
- Appointed by: Cecil Andrus
- Preceded by: Larry Boyle
- Succeeded by: Joel Horton

Personal details
- Born: September 1, 1951 (age 75) Tokyo, Japan
- Spouse: Kim J. Trout (div.)
- Education: University of Idaho (BA, JD)

Linda Jayne Copple Trout (born September 1, 1951) is an American lawyer and retired judge from Idaho. She is a former chief justice of the Idaho Supreme Court, the only female to hold that position. Appointed by Governor Cecil Andrus as an associate justice in 1992, she was the first of four women to serve on the court.

Born in Tokyo, Japan, Trout was adopted by a Boise pediatrician, Dr. B.I. "Bing" Copple, and graduated from Boise High School in 1969. She attended the University of Idaho in Moscow, and was a member of Pi Beta Phi sorority. Trout earned a bachelor's degree in 1973, and a J.D. from the UI College of Law in 1977.

Trout passed the bar in Idaho in 1977 and was in private practice in Lewiston for six years. She was appointed a county magistrate judge in 1983 and was elected in 1990 as a state judge in the second district, based in Lewiston.

Trout was appointed to the state's supreme court in 1992 and took office on her 41st birthday. She retained her seat in statewide elections in 1996 (unopposed) and 2002. Trout became the chief justice in February 1997, elected unanimously by the other justices, and served two terms in that capacity, over seven years. She was on the state's highest court for fifteen years and retired with over a year left in her term in August 2007, succeeded by Joel Horton.

She was married to attorney Kim J. Trout (B.S. 1976, J.D. 1979, Idaho).

== See also ==
- List of female state supreme court justices

Legal offices
Preceded by Charles McDevitt	Chief Justice of the Idaho Supreme Court; 1997–2004	Succeeded by Gerald Schroeder
