= Idaho Attorney General =

Elected office in Idaho, United States

Attorney General of Idaho
- Great Seal of the State of Idaho

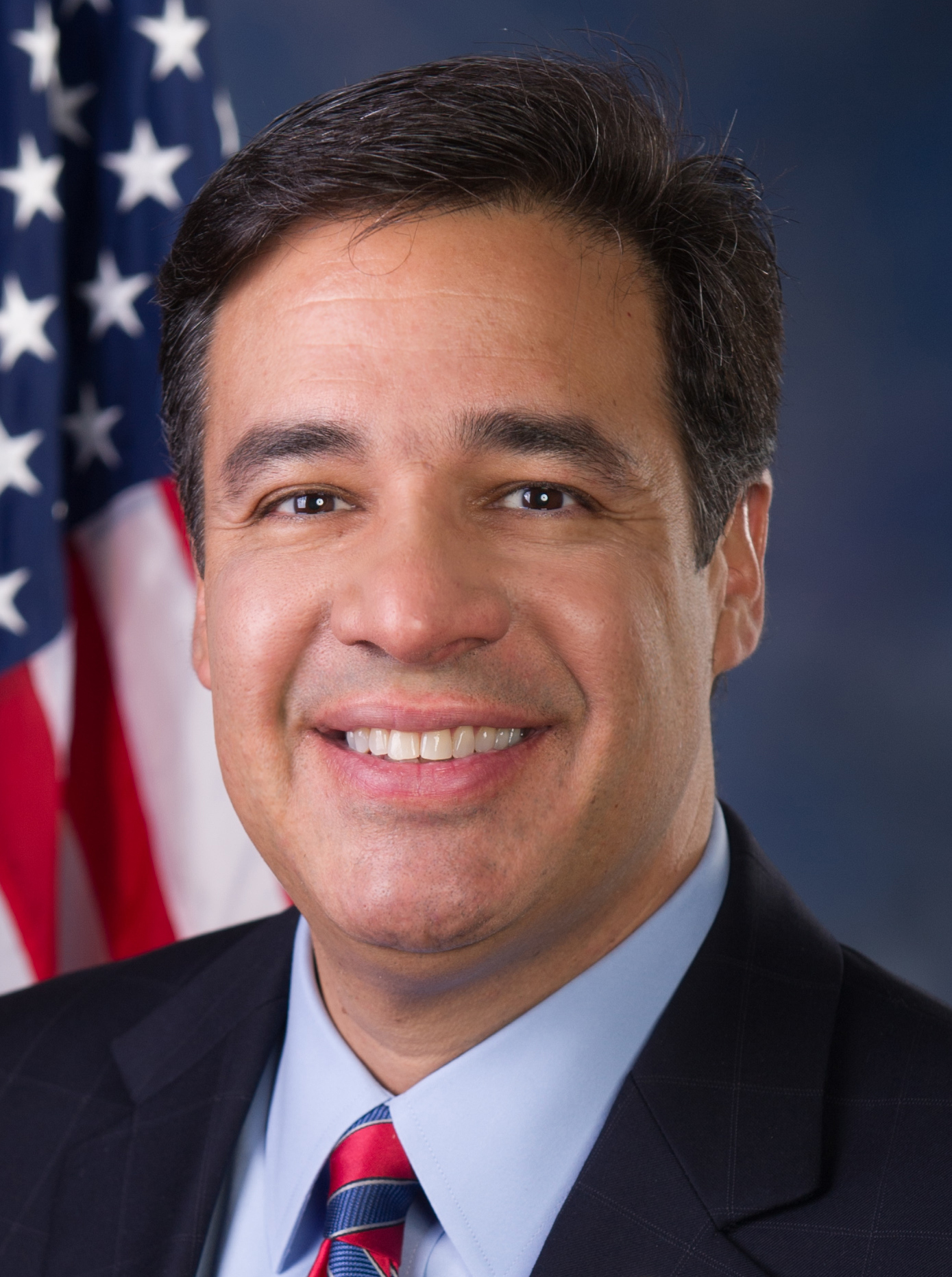
- Incumbent; Raúl Labrador since January 2, 2023
- Term length: Four years
- Inaugural holder: D. P. B. Pride
- Website: Attorney General of Idaho

The attorney general of Idaho is an elected office that assists local law enforcement agencies in the state of Idaho. They provide legal representation for state agencies, state corporations and any persons holding ownership of property, as well as enforcing consumer protection laws. They advise state officials and entities in relation to the law. The incumbent attorney general is Raúl Labrador, who was first elected in 2022. Although the attorney general has a four-year term, there are no limits on how many attempts that an incumbent can run for office.

Idaho was admitted to the Union on July 3, 1890. The Office of Attorney General of the State of Idaho was created by the Constitution of Idaho, 1889, Art. IV, Sec. 1.

== Qualifications ==
Candidates for attorney general must be members in good-standing with the Idaho State Bar, a U.S. citizen, at least 30 years of age, and a resident of Idaho for at least two years prior to the election.

== Attorneys general of the Territory of Idaho ==
Idaho Territory was created from Dakota Territory, Nebraska Territory, and Washington Territory on March 4, 1863.

The Office of Territorial Attorney General was created in 1885 (Laws of the Territory of Idaho, 1885, p. 31).

Attorneys general of the Territory of Idaho
#	Image	Name	Term of service	Political party
1		D. P. B. Pride	1885–1887	
2		Richard Z. Johnson	1885–1890	

== Officeholders ==
Attorneys general by party affiliation
Party	Attorneys general
Republican	22
Democratic	10
Populist	1

Attorneys general of the State of Idaho
#	Image	Name	Term of service	Political party
1		George H. Roberts	1891–1893	Republican
2		George M. Parsons	1893–1897	Republican
3		Robert McFarland	1897–1899	Populist
4		S. H. Hays	1899–1901	Democratic
5		Frank Martin	1901–1903	Democratic
6		John A. Bagley	1903–1905	Republican
7		John Guheen	1905–1909	Republican
8		D. C. McDougall	1909–1913	Republican
9		Joseph H. Peterson	1913–1917	Republican
10		T. A. Walters	1917–1919	Democratic
11		Roy L. Black	1919–1923	Republican
12		A. H. Conner	1923–1927	Republican
13		Frank L. Stephan	1927–1929	Republican
14		W. D. Gillis	1929–1931	Republican
15		Fred J. Babcock	1931–1933	Republican
16		Bert Miller	1933–1937	Democratic
17		J. W. Taylor	1937–1941	Democratic
18		Bert Miller	1941–1945	Democratic
19		Frank Langley	1945–1947	Democratic
20		Robert Ailshie	1947	Republican
21		Robert Smylie	1947–1955	Republican
22		Graydon W. Smith	1955–1959	Republican
23		Frank Benson	1959–1963	Democratic
24		Allan Shepard	1963–1969	Republican
25		Robert Robson	1969–1971	Republican
26		W. Anthony Park	1971–1975	Democratic
27		Wayne Kidwell	1975–1979	Republican
28		David Leroy	1979–1983	Republican
29		Jim Jones	1983–1991	Republican
30		Larry Echo Hawk	1991–1995	Democratic
31		Allan Lance	1995–2003	Republican
32		Lawrence Wasden	2003–2023	Republican
33		Raúl Labrador	2023–present	Republican

== See also ==
- Full list of Idaho statewide elected officials below
