= Courts of Idaho =

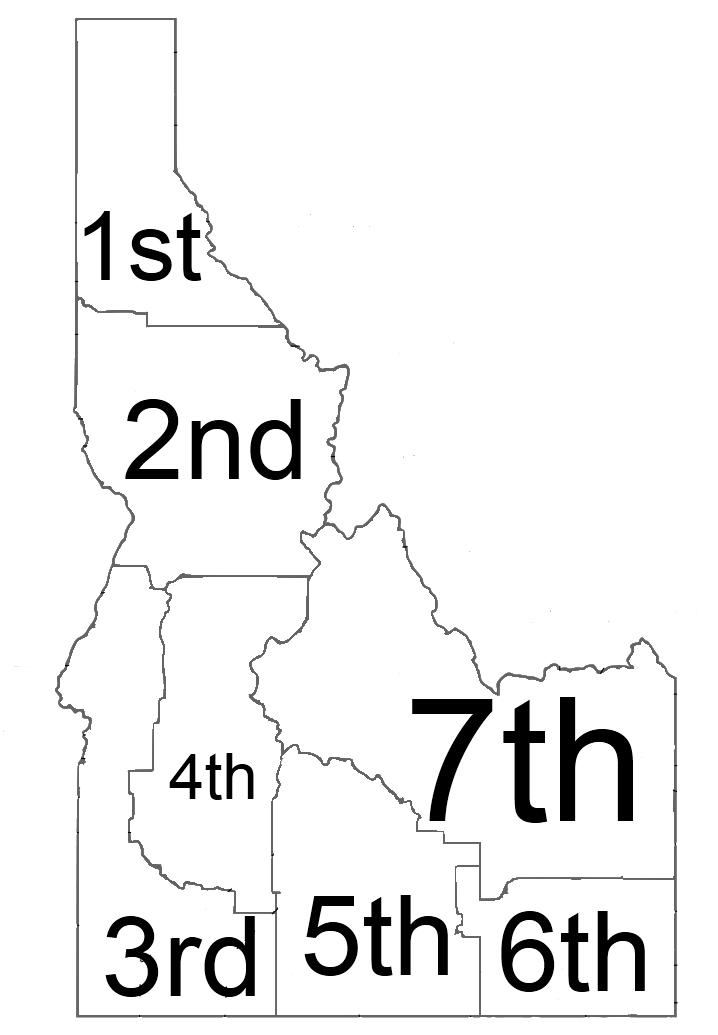
Judicial districts map

Courts of Idaho include:

State courts of Idaho

- Idaho Supreme Court
  - Idaho Court of Appeals
    - Idaho District Courts (7 judicial districts)
      - Idaho Drug Court
      - Idaho Mental Health Court

Federal courts located in Idaho

- United States District Court for the District of Idaho
