= Idaho Supreme Court =

Highest court in the U.S. state of Idaho

Coordinates: 43.616°N 116.197°W

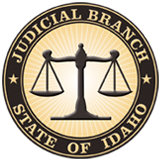

- The Idaho Supreme Court building in 2026
- Interactive map of Idaho Supreme Court
- Established: 1863 - Territorial; 1890 - State
- Location: 451 W. State Street; Boise, Idaho, U.S.
- Composition method: non-partisan state-wide staggered elections
- Authorised by: Idaho State Constitution
- Appeals to: Supreme Court of the United States (for matters involving federal law or the U.S. Constitution only)
- Judge term length: 6 years 4 years (Chief Justice)
- Number of positions: 5
- Website: Official website

Chief Justice
- Currently: Robyn Brody
- Since: October 1, 2026

The Idaho Supreme Court is the state supreme court of Idaho and is composed of the chief justice and four associate justices.

The decisions of the Idaho Supreme Court are binding on all other Idaho state courts. The only court that may reverse or modify its decisions is the Supreme Court of the United States.

The court moved into its present building 56 years ago in 1970; it was previously housed in the nearby state capitol building.

== Justices ==
Justices are elected in non-partisan statewide elections and serve staggered six-year terms. Elections are held in the state primary, now in May, with run-off elections in November. The Chief Justice is selected by an election among the five justices and term length for that office is four years. Prior to 1983, the position went to the justice with the least time remaining in his term.

The court originally had three justices; it was expanded to five in 1921.

=== Current justices ===
Name	Born	Start	Chief term	Term ends	Appointer	Law school
Robyn Brody, Chief Justice	February 13, 1970 (age 56)	January 2, 2017	2026–present	2028	—N/a (Note: Not appointed, won nonpartisan election for open seat)	Denver
Gregory W. Moeller	May 1, 1963 (age 63)	January 3, 2019	–	2032	Butch Otter (R)	BYU
Colleen Zahn	October 7, 1973 (age 53)	July 1, 2021	–	2028	Brad Little (R)	Idaho
Cynthia Meyer	c. 1960 (age 65–66)	December 2023	–	2032	Brad Little (R)	Utah
Jason Scott		November 2, 2026	–	2030	Brad Little (R)	Duke

=== Women on the Supreme Court ===
The first female justice on the Idaho Supreme Court was Linda Copple Trout, appointed in 1992 by Governor Cecil Andrus and elected in 1996 and 2002; she was also the state's first female chief justice (1997–2004). The second female justice was Cathy Silak, appointed by Andrus in 1993 and elected in 1994. She lost her reelection bid in 2000 to Dan Eismann and became the first incumbent justice from the court to be defeated since 1944.

After Trout's retirement in 2007, no women were on the court until the election of Robyn Brody in 2016 to a vacant seat, the first by a female; she is the only justice on the current court not first appointed. Colleen Zahn joined the court in 2021, appointed by Governor Brad Little; Brody and Zahn ran unopposed in 2022. With Little's appointment of Cynthia Meyer in 2023, the court currently has a female majority; Meyer ran unopposed in 2026 and Brody became chief justice in October 2026.

=== List of chief justices ===
Name	Years
Robyn Brody	2026–present
G. Richard Bevan	2021–2026
Roger Burdick (2)	2017–2020
Jim Jones	2015–2017
Roger Burdick	2011–2015
Dan Eismann	2007–2011
Gerald Schroeder	2004–2007
Linda Copple Trout	1997–2004
Charles McDevitt	1993–1997
Robert Bakes	1989–1993
Allan Shepard	1987–1989
Charles Donaldson	1983–1987

- Election by peers began in 1983.

== Video coverage ==
The Idaho Supreme Court first permitted live video and audio coverage from its chambers in late 1978.

== See also ==
- Courts of Idaho
