= 2022 Idaho elections =

- November 8, 2022
- Registered: 1,048,263
- Turnout: 57.2%

A general election was scheduled in the U.S. state of Idaho on November 8, 2022. All of Idaho's executive officers were up for election as well as both of Idaho's two seats in the United States House of Representatives and one United States Senate seat. Primary elections elections were held on May 17, 2022.

== Federal offices ==
=== United States Senate ===
One of the two United States Senators representing Idaho was up for election. Incumbent Republican Mike Crapo was re-elected to a fifth term with 60.68% of the votes.

=== United States House of Representatives ===
Idaho had two representatives in the United States House of Representatives who were up for election. Both the incumbent Republican congressmen were re-elected.

== Governor ==
Incumbent Republican governor Brad Little ran for re-election and won with 60% of the votes.

2022 Idaho Gubernatorial election
Party	Candidate	Votes	%
Republican	Brad Little (incumbent)	358,598	60.5%
Democratic	Stephen Heidt	120,160	20.3%
Independent	Ammon Bundy	101,835	17.2%
Libertarian	Paul Sand	6,714	1.1%
Constitution	Chantyrose Davison	5,250	0.9%
Write-in candidate	Lisa Marie	67	0.0%
Total votes		592,624	100%

== Lieutenant governor ==
Incumbent Republican Janice McGeachin chose not to run for re-election and instead unsuccessfully ran for governor. Former speaker of the Idaho House of Representatives Scott Bedke won the general election.

2022 Idaho Lieutenant Gubernatorial election
Party	Candidate	Votes	%
Republican	Scott Bedke	376,269	64.4%
Democratic	Terri Pickens Manweiler	178,147	30.5%
Constitution	Pro-Life	29,989	5.1%
Total votes		584,405	100%
Republican hold			

== Attorney general ==
Incumbent Republican Lawrence Wasden sought a sixth term in office, but was defeated in the primary by former congressman Raúl Labrador who won the election with 62% of the votes.

2022 Idaho Attorney General election
Party	Candidate	Votes	%
Republican	Raúl Labrador	367,579	62.6%
Democratic	Tom Arkoosh	219,405	37.4%
Total votes		586,984	100%
Republican hold			

== Secretary of state ==
Incumbent Republican Lawerence Denney was eligible to seek re-election but declined to run for a third term. Ada County clerk Phil McGrane won the election with 72% of the votes.

2022 Idaho Secretary of State election
Party	Candidate	Votes	%
Republican	Phil McGrane	418,945	72.1%
Democratic	Shawn Keenan	159,819	27.4%
Independent	Garth G. Gaylord (write-in)	2,778	0.5%
Total votes		580,912	100%
Republican hold			

== Treasurer ==
Incumbent Republican Julie Ellsworth was re-elected with 71% of the votes.

2022 Idaho State Treasurer election
Party	Candidate	Votes	%
Republican	Julie Ellsworth (incumbent)	412,502	71.1%
Democratic	Deborah Silver	167,596	28.9%
Total votes		580,098	100%

== Controller ==
2022 Idaho state controller election
- November 8, 2022

Nominee	Brandon Woolf	Dianna David
Party	Republican	Democratic
Popular vote	405,075	156,232
Percentage	69.53%	26.82%
- Woolf: 50–60% 60–70% 70–80% 80–90% David: 40–50% 60–70%
Controller before election
Brandon Woolf
Republican
Elected Controller
Brandon Woolf
Republican

Incumbent Republican controller Brandon Woolf won re-election to a third full term with 69% of the votes, defeating Democratic challenger Dianna David.

=== Republican Primary ===
==== Nominee ====
- Brandon Woolf, incumbent controller.

==== Primary results ====
Republican primary results
Party	Candidate	Votes	%
Republican	Brandon Woolf (incumbent)	220,254	100%
Total votes		220,254	100%

=== Democratic Primary ===
==== Nominee ====
- Dianna David

==== Primary results ====
Democratic primary results
Party	Candidate	Votes	%
Democratic	Dianna David	31,652	100%
Total votes		31,652	100%

=== Constitution Primary ===
==== Nominee ====
- Miste Gardner, news personality.

==== Primary results ====
Constitution primary results
Party	Candidate	Votes	%
Constitution	Miste Gardner	503	100%
Total votes		503	100%

=== General election ===
2022 Idaho State Controller election
Party	Candidate	Votes	%
Republican	Brandon Woolf (incumbent)	405,075	69.5%
Democratic	Dianna David	156,232	26.8%
Constitution	Miste Gardner	21,298	3.7%
Total votes		582,605	100%

== Superintendent of public instruction ==
2022 Idaho Superintendent of public instruction election
- November 8, 2022

Nominee	Debbie Critchfield	Terry Gilbert
Party	Republican	Democratic
Popular vote	404,549	175,076
Percentage	69.79%	30.21%
- Critchfield: 50–60% 60–70% 70–80% 80–90% >90% Gilbert: 50–60% 60–70%
Superintendent before election
Sherri Ybarra
Republican
Elected Superintendent
Debbie Critchfield
Republican

Incumbent Republican Sherri Ybarra sought a third term in office but faced a tough challenge in the primary. Former State Board of Education president and Cassia County School Board member Debbie Critchfield won the Republican primary, finishing ahead of former state legislator Branden Durst while Ybarra slumped to third place.

Critchfield would go on to win the general election with nearly 70% of the votes.

=== Democratic Primary ===
==== Nominee ====
- Terry Gilbert, teacher.

==== Primary results ====
Democratic primary results
Party	Candidate	Votes	%
Democratic	Terry Gilbert	31,868	100%
Total votes		31,868	100%

=== Republican Primary ===
==== Candidates ====
- Sherri Ybarra, incumbent Superintendent.
- Branden Durst, former Democratic state legislator.
- Debbie Critchfield, former State Board of Education president and Cassia County School Board member.

==== Primary results ====
Primary results by county: Critchfield: 70–80%; 60–70%; 50–60%; 40–50%; 30–40%; Durst: 60–70%; 50–60%; 40–50%; 30–40%; Ybarra: 40–50%

Republican primary results
Party	Candidate	Votes	%
Republican	Debbie Critchfield	105,070	39.6%
Republican	Branden Durst	89,451	33.8%
Republican	Sherri Ybarra (incumbent)	70,431	26.6%
Total votes		264,952	100%

=== General Election ===
==== Debate ====
2022 Idaho superintendent of public instruction election debate
No.	Date	Host	Moderator	Link	Republican	Democratic
Key: P Participant A Absent N Not invited I Invited W Withdrawn						
Key: P Participant A Absent N Not invited I Invited W Withdrawn					Debbie Critchfield	Terry Gilbert
1	October 24, 2022	IdahoPTV	Melissa Davlin	Idaho PBS	P	P

==== Results ====
2022 Idaho Superintendent of Public Instruction election
Party	Candidate	Votes	%
Republican	Debbie Critchfield	404,549	69.8%
Democratic	Terry Gilbert	175,076	30.2%
Total votes		579,625	100%
Republican hold			

== State legislature ==
All 35 seats in the Idaho Senate and 70 seats in the Idaho House of Representatives were up for election.

=== Idaho Senate ===
Party	Before	After	Change
Republican	28	28	Steady
Democratic	7	7	Steady
Total	35	35	

=== Idaho House of Representatives ===
Party	Before	After	Change
Republican	58	59	▲1
Democratic	12	11	▼1
Total	70	70	

== Judicial seats ==
=== Supreme Court ===
Two justices on the Idaho Supreme Court ran for election.

Justice Colleen Zahn was appointed by Governor Brad Little in 2021 to succeed Roger Burdick, while Robyn Brody was elected to the seat vacated by Jim Jones in 2016. Both of them ran unopposed and secured another term.

=== Court of Appeals ===
Incumbent Idaho Court of Appeals judge Molly Huskey won re-election unopposed.

== Ballot measures ==
Two statewide ballot measures appeared on the ballot. Both were approved.

=== Advisory Question ===
Results by county: Yes: 60–70%; 70–80%; 80–90%

The Idaho Advisory Question, if approved, would advise the Legislature on a bill to enact a flat income and corporate tax structure, send tax rebates to qualifying taxpayers, and dedicate an annual $400 million to the state's education.

Idaho Advisory Question
Choice	Votes	%
For	454,746	79.76
Against	115,381	20.24
Total	570,127	100.00

=== Constitutional Amendment SJR 102 (2022) ===
Results by county: Yes: 50-60%; 60-70%; No: 50-60%

The Idaho Constitutional Amendment SJR 102, if approved, would allow the Senate president (lieutenant governor) and House speaker to convene a special legislative session upon receiving a joint written request from 60% of each chamber's legislators.

Idaho Constitutional Amendment SJR 102
Choice	Votes	%
For	287,194	51.76
Against	267,623	48.24
Total	554,817	100.00

== See also ==
- Elections in Idaho
- Politics of Idaho
- Political party strength in Idaho
