= 2018 Idaho elections =

- November 6, 2018
- Registered: 917,612
- Turnout: 66.8%

A general election was held in the U.S. state of Idaho on November 6, 2018. All of Idaho's executive officers were up for election as well as both of Idaho's two seats in the United States House of Representatives. Primary elections were held on May 15, 2018.

== Federal offices ==
=== United States House of Representatives ===
Both of Idaho's two seats in the United States House of Representatives were up for election in 2018.

In the first congressional district, Raúl Labrador did not seek reelection and unsuccessfully ran for governor. Former state senator and fellow Republican Russ Fulcher was elected to represent the district.

In the second congressional district, Mike Simpson ran for reelection and won comfortably.

== Governor ==
Incumbent Republican governor Butch Otter chose not to seek a fourth term. He was succeeded by lieutenant governor Brad Little.

Idaho gubernatorial election, 2018
Party	Candidate	Votes	%
Republican	Brad Little	361,661	59.8%
Democratic	Paulette Jordan	231,081	38.2%
Libertarian	Bev Boeck	6,551	1.1%
Constitution	Walter Bayes	5,787	1.0%
Write-in	Lisa Marie	51	0.0%
Total votes		605,131	100%
Republican hold			

== Lieutenant governor ==
Incumbent Republican lieutenant governor Brad Little did not run for re-election to a third full term, and instead ran for governor. Former state representative Janice McGeachin won the general election with nearly 60% of the votes.

Idaho lieutenant gubernatorial election, 2018
Party	Candidate	Votes	%
Republican	Janice McGeachin	356,512	59.7%
Democratic	Kristin Collum	240,355	40.3%
Total votes		596,867	100%
Republican hold			

== Attorney general ==
2018 Idaho Attorney General election
- November 6, 2018

Nominee	Lawrence Wasden	Bruce Bistline
Party	Republican	Democratic
Popular vote	384,791	203,283
Percentage	65.4%	34.6%
- Wasden: 50–60% 60–70% 70–80% 80–90% Bistline: 50–60% 60–70%
Attorney General before election
Lawrence Wasden
Republican
Elected Attorney General
Lawrence Wasden
Republican

Incumbent Republican attorney general Lawrence Wasden won re-election to a fifth term.

=== Republican primary ===
==== Nominee ====
- Lawrence Wasden, incumbent.

==== Primary results ====
Republican primary results
Party	Candidate	Votes	%
Republican	Lawrence Wasden (incumbent)	157,064	100.0
Total votes		157,064	100.0

=== Democratic primary ===
==== Nominee ====
- Bruce Bistline, attorney and Democratic nominee in 2014.

==== Primary results ====
Democratic primary results
Party	Candidate	Votes	%
Democratic	Bruce Bistline	47,637	100.0
Total votes		47,637	100.0

=== General election ===
==== Predictions ====
Source	Ranking	As of
Governing magazine	Safe R	June 4, 2018

==== Results ====
Idaho Attorney General election, 2018
Party	Candidate	Votes	%
Republican	Lawrence Wasden (incumbent)	384,791	65.4%
Democratic	Bruce Bistline	203,283	34.6%
Total votes		588,074	100%

== Secretary of state ==
2018 Idaho Secretary of State election
- November 6, 2018

Nominee	Lawerence Denney	Jill Humble
Party	Republican	Democratic
Popular vote	370,654	222,073
Percentage	62.5%	37.5%
- Denney: 50–60% 60–70% 70–80% 80–90% Humble: 50–60% 60–70%
Secretary of State before election
Lawerence Denney
Republican
Elected Secretary of State
Lawerence Denney
Republican

Incumbent Republican secretary of state Lawerence Denney won re-election to a second term.

=== Republican primary ===
==== Nominee ====
- Lawerence Denney, incumbent.

==== Primary results ====
Republican primary results
Party	Candidate	Votes	%
Republican	Lawerence Denney (incumbent)	157,014	100.0
Total votes		157,014	100.0

=== Democratic primary ===
==== Candidates ====
- Jill Humble, nurse.
- Joseph Chastain, tech consultant.

==== Primary results ====
Democratic primary results
Party	Candidate	Votes	%
Democratic	Jill Humble	42,611	74.8
Democratic	Joseph Chastain	14,361	25.2
Total votes		56,972	100.0

=== General election ===
==== Predictions ====
Source	Ranking	As of
Governing magazine	Safe R	June 4, 2018

==== Debate ====
2018 Idaho secretary of state election debate
No.	Date	Host	Moderator	Link	Republican	Democratic
Key: P Participant A Absent N Not invited I Invited W Withdrawn						
Key: P Participant A Absent N Not invited I Invited W Withdrawn					Lawerence Denney	Jill Humble
1	October 11, 2018	IdahoPTV	Melissa Davlin	Idaho PBS	P	P

==== Results ====
Idaho Secretary of State election, 2018
Party	Candidate	Votes	%
Republican	Lawerence Denney (incumbent)	370,654	62.5%
Democratic	Jill Humble	222,073	37.5%
Total votes		592,727	100%

== Treasurer ==
2018 Idaho state treasurer election
- November 6, 2018
Nominee	Julie Ellsworth
Party	Republican
Popular vote	465,109
Percentage	100%
Treasurer before election
Ron Crane
Republican
Elected Treasurer
Julie Ellsworth
Republican

Incumbent Republican state treasurer Ron Crane did not run for re-election to a sixth term. Former state representative Julie Ellsworth won the election unopposed as no Democrats filed to run for the race.

=== Republican primary ===
==== Candidates ====
- Julie Ellsworth, former state representative.
- Tom Kealey, Chicago Connection Restaurant Group owner and former certified public accountant.
- Vicky McIntyre, Ada County Treasurer.

==== Debate ====
2018 Idaho treasurer election Republican primary candidate debate
No.	Date	Host	Moderator	Link	Republican	Republican	Republican
Key: P Participant A Absent N Not invited I Invited W Withdrawn							
Key: P Participant A Absent N Not invited I Invited W Withdrawn					Julie Ellsworth	Tom Kealey	Vicky McIntyre
1	April 19, 2018	KCTS	Melissa Davlin	Cascade PBS	P	P	P

==== Primary results ====
Primary results by county: Ellsworth: 30–40%; 40–50%; 50–60%; Kealey: 30–40%; McIntyre: 30–40%

Republican primary results
Party	Candidate	Votes	%
Republican	Julie Ellsworth	60,482	36.8
Republican	Tom Kealey	55,657	33.8
Republican	Vicky McIntyre	48,310	29.4
Total votes		164,449	100.0

=== General election ===
Idaho State Treasurer election, 2018
Party	Candidate	Votes	%
Republican	Julie Ellsworth	465,109	100%
Total votes		465,109	100%
Republican hold			

== Controller ==
2018 Idaho state controller election
- November 6, 2018
Nominee	Brandon Woolf
Party	Republican
Popular vote	465,105
Percentage	100%
- County results Woolf: 90–100%
Controller before election
Brandon Woolf
Republican
Elected Controller
Brandon Woolf
Republican

Incumbent Republican Controller Brandon Woolf was unopposed in both the Republican primary and in the general election.

=== Republican primary ===
==== Nominee ====
- Brandon Woolf, incumbent.

==== Primary results ====
Republican primary results
Party	Candidate	Votes	%
Republican	Brandon Woolf (incumbent)	154,375	100.0
Total votes		154,375	100.0

=== General election ===
Idaho State Controller election, 2018
Party	Candidate	Votes	%
Republican	Brandon Woolf (incumbent)	465,105	100%
Total votes		465,105	100%
Republican hold			

== Superintendent of public instruction ==
2018 Idaho superintendent of public instruction election
- November 6, 2018
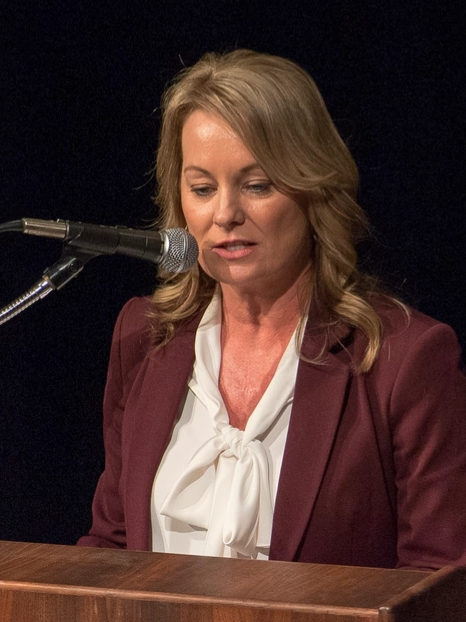

Nominee	Sherri Ybarra	Cindy Wilson
Party	Republican	Democratic
Popular vote	305,977	288,488
Percentage	51.5%	48.5%
- Ybarra: 50–60% 60–70% 70–80% 80–90% >90% Wilson: 50–60% 60–70% 70–80% 80–90% >90%
Superintendent before election
Sherri Ybarra
Republican
Elected Superintendent
Sherri Ybarra
Republican

Incumbent Republican superintendent Sherri Ybarra won a second term by a 3% margin. As of 2026, this is the last time a statewide race in Idaho was decided by margin of less than 20%.

=== Democratic primary ===
==== Candidates ====
- Cindy Wilson, teacher.
- Allen Humble, retired hospital surveyor.

==== Primary results ====
Democratic primary results
Party	Candidate	Votes	%
Democratic	Cindy Wilson	49,565	86.0
Democratic	Allen Humble	8,051	14.0
Total votes		57,616	100.0

=== Republican primary ===
==== Candidates ====
- Sherri Ybarra, incumbent.
- Jeff Dillon, Wilder School Superintendent.

==== Debate ====
2018 Idaho superintendent of public instruction Republican primary debate
No.	Date	Host	Moderator	Link	Republican	Republican
Key: P Participant A Absent N Not invited I Invited W Withdrawn						
Key: P Participant A Absent N Not invited I Invited W Withdrawn					Sherri Ybarra	Jeff Dillon
1	April 27, 2018	IdahoPTV	Melissa Davlin	Idaho PBS	P	P

==== Primary results ====
Republican primary results
Party	Candidate	Votes	%
Republican	Sherri Ybarra (incumbent)	103,071	58.9
Republican	Jeff Dillon	71,856	41.1
Total votes		174,927	100.0

=== General election ===
==== Endorsements ====
Sherri Ybarra (R)

Statewide officials

- Butch Otter, governor of Idaho.
- Brad Little, lieutenant governor of Idaho.
- Lawrence Denney, Idaho secretary of state.
- Brandon Woolf, Idaho state controller.
- Ron Crane, Idaho state treasurer.
- Lawrence Wasden, Idaho attorney general.
- Dave Leroy, former Idaho lieutenant governor and attorney general.
Cindy Wilson (D)

Organizations

- Idaho Education Association
- Idaho AFL-CIO

Statewide Officials

- Jim Jones, former Idaho attorney general and Idaho Supreme Court chief justice. (Republican)

Individuals

- Frank VanderSloot, businessman. (Republican)

Newspapers

- Idaho Statesman

==== Debate ====
2018 Idaho superintendent of public instruction election debate
No.	Date	Host	Moderator	Link	Republican	Democratic
Key: P Participant A Absent N Not invited I Invited W Withdrawn						
Key: P Participant A Absent N Not invited I Invited W Withdrawn					Sherri Ybarra	Cindy Wilson
1	October 12, 2018	IdahoPTV	Melissa Davlin	Idaho PBS	P	P

==== Results ====
Idaho superintendent of public instruction election, 2018
Party	Candidate	Votes	%
Republican	Sherri Ybarra (incumbent)	305,977	51.5%
Democratic	Cindy Wilson	288,488	48.5%
Total votes		594,465	100%
Republican hold			

===== By congressional district =====
Despite losing the election, Wilson won the second congressional district.

District	Ybarra	Wilson	Representative
1st	58%	42%	Raúl Labrador (115th Congress)
1st	58%	42%	Russ Fulcher (116th Congress)
2nd	44%	56%	Mike Simpson

== State legislature ==
All 35 seats in the Idaho Senate and 70 seats in the Idaho House of Representatives were up for election.

=== Idaho Senate ===
Party	Before	After	Change
Republican	29	28	▼1
Democratic	6	7	▲1
Total	35	35	

=== Idaho House of Representatives ===
Party	Before	After	Change
Republican	59	56	▼3
Democratic	11	14	▲3
Total	70	70	

== Judicial seats ==
=== Supreme Court ===
Incumbent Idaho Supreme Court Justice G. Richard Bevan was appointed by Governor Butch Otter in 2017 to succeed Daniel Eismann. He ran unopposed and secured a full term.

=== Court of Appeals ===
Two judges on the Idaho Court of Appeals ran for election.

Incumbent judge David Gratton has been serving since 2009 while Jessica Lorello was appointed by Governor Otter in 2017 to succeed John Melanson. Both of them ran unopposed and secured another term.

== Ballot measures ==
Two statewide ballot measures appeared on the ballot.

=== Proposition 1 ===
If approved, Proposition 1 would have authorized the usage of video terminals for betting on historical horse races. It was defeated 54%-46%.

=== Proposition 2 ===
Idaho Proposition 2 was an initiative to expand Medicaid to those under sixty-five years old in the state. It was approved 61%-39%.

== See also ==
- Elections in Idaho
- Politics of Idaho
- Political party strength in Idaho
