= 2014 Idaho elections =

- November 4, 2014
- Registered: 703,709
- Turnout: 56.1%

A general election was held in the U.S. state of Idaho on November 4, 2014. All of Idaho's executive offices were up for election as well as a United States Senate seat, and both of Idaho's two seats in the United States House of Representatives. Primary elections were held on May 20, 2014.

== Federal ==
=== United States Senate ===
Incumbent Republican senator Jim Risch ran for re-election to a second term in office.

Boise attorney Nels Mitchell won the Democratic nomination.

United States Senate election in Idaho, 2014
Party	Candidate	Votes	%
Republican	Jim Risch (incumbent)	285,596	65.3
Democratic	Nels Mitchell	151,574	34.7
Total votes		437,170	100.0
Republican hold			

=== United States House of Representatives ===
Both of Idaho's two seats in the United States House of Representatives were up for election in 2014. Both incumbents, Raúl Labrador and Mike Simpson won re-election handily.

== Governor ==
Incumbent Republican Governor Butch Otter won a third term in office.

He was challenged in the Republican primary by State Senator Russ Fulcher. Otter defeated Fulcher 51% to 44%. Perennial candidate Walt Bayes and candidate for Idaho's 1st congressional district in 2000 and 2010 and candidate for Mayor of Boise in 2001 Harley Brown took 2% and 3%, respectively.

A.J. Balukoff, a businessman and President of the Boise School District Board of Trustees comfortably defeated Terry Kerr, a former Republican candidate for local office, for the Democratic nomination.

Idaho gubernatorial election, 2014
Party	Candidate	Votes	%
Republican	Butch Otter (incumbent)	235,405	53.52
Democratic	A.J. Balukoff	169,556	38.55
Libertarian	John Bujak	17,884	4.07
Independent	Jill Humble	8,801	2.00
Constitution	Steven Pankey	5,219	1.19
Independent	Pro-Life	2,870	0.65
Write-in		95	0.02
Total votes		439,830	100.0
Republican hold			

== Lieutenant governor ==
2014 Idaho lieutenant gubernatorial election
- November 4, 2014
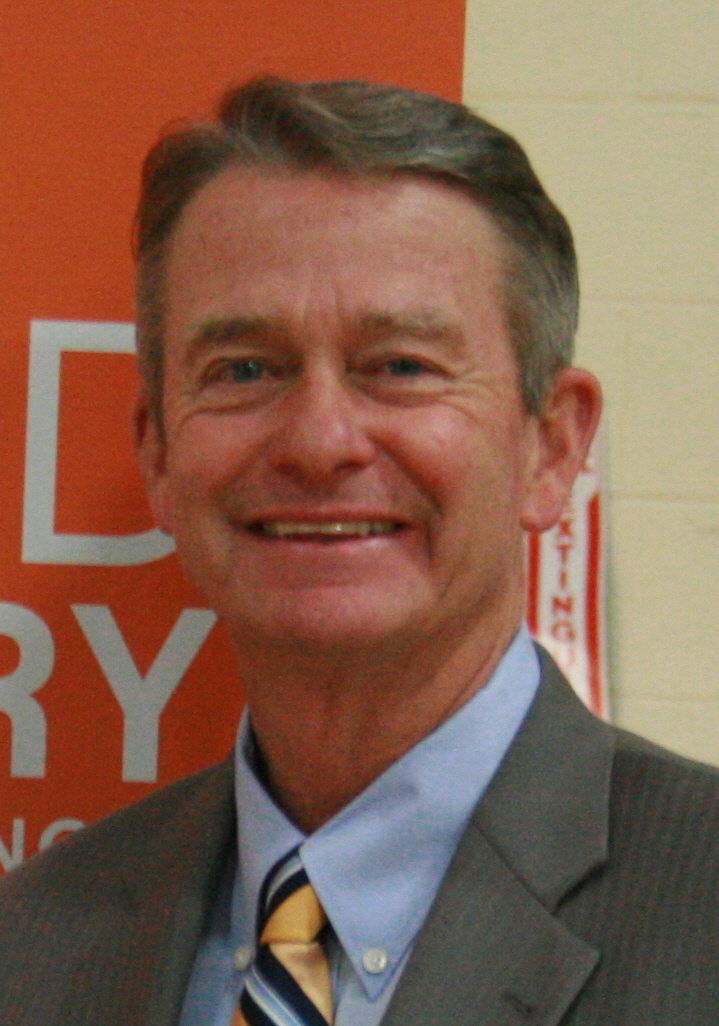

Nominee	Brad Little	Bert Marley
Party	Republican	Democratic
Popular vote	271,268	141,917
Percentage	62.8%	32.9%
- Little: 50–60% 60–70% 70–80% 80–90% Marley: 40–50% 50–60%
Lieutenant Governor before election
Brad Little
Republican
Elected Lieutenant Governor
Brad Little
Republican

Incumbent Republican lieutenant governor Brad Little was elected to a second term in office.

=== Republican primary ===
==== Candidates ====
- Brad Little, incumbent lieutenant governor.
- Jim Chmelik, Idaho County Commissioner.

==== Primary debate ====
2018 Idaho lieutenant gubernatorial Republican primary debate
No.	Date	Host	Moderator	Link	Republican	Republican
Key: P Participant A Absent N Not invited I Invited W Withdrawn						
Key: P Participant A Absent N Not invited I Invited W Withdrawn					Brad Little	Jim Chmelik
1	May 8, 2014	IdahoPTV	Aaron Kunz	PBS	P	P

==== Primary results ====
Republican primary results
Party	Candidate	Votes	%
Republican	Brad Little (incumbent)	96,780	66.8
Republican	Jim Chmelik	48,099	33.2
Total votes		144,879	100.0

=== Democratic primary ===
==== Nominee ====
- Bert Marley, former state senator and candidate for Superintendent of Public Instruction in 2006.

==== Primary results ====
Democratic primary results
Party	Candidate	Votes	%
Democratic	Bert Marley	23,987	100.0
Total votes		23,987	100.0

=== Constitution nominee ===
- David Hartigan

=== General election ===
==== Polling ====
Poll source	Date(s) administered	Sample size	Margin of error	Brad Little (R)	Bert Marley (D)	David Hartigan (C)	Undecided
Public Policy Polling	October 30–November 2, 2014	1,001	± 3.1%	56%	30%	7%	8%
Public Policy Polling	October 9–12, 2014	522	± 4.3%	42%	25%	12%	20%

==== Debate ====
2018 Idaho lieutenant gubernatorial election debate
No.	Date	Host	Moderator	Link	Republican	Democratic
Key: P Participant A Absent N Not invited I Invited W Withdrawn						
Key: P Participant A Absent N Not invited I Invited W Withdrawn					Brad Little	Bert Marley
1	October 29, 2014	IdahoPTV	Aaron Kunz	PBS	P	P

==== Results ====
Idaho lieutenant gubernatorial election, 2014
Party	Candidate	Votes	%
Republican	Brad Little (incumbent)	271,268	62.8
Democratic	Bert Marley	141,917	32.9
Constitution	David Hartigan	18,705	4.3
Total votes		431,890	100.0
Republican hold			

== Attorney general ==
2014 Idaho attorney general election
- November 4, 2014

Nominee	Lawrence Wasden	Bruce Bistline
Party	Republican	Democratic
Popular vote	289,672	136,081
Percentage	68.0%	32.0%
- Wasden: 50–60% 60–70% 70–80% 80–90% Bistline: 50–60%
Attorney general before election
Lawrence Wasden
Republican
Elected Attorney general
Lawrence Wasden
Republican

Incumbent Republican attorney general Lawrence Wasden was elected to a fourth term in office.

=== Republic primary ===
==== Candidates ====
- Lawrence Wasden, incumbent attorney general.
- C.T. "Chris" Troupis, attorney.

==== Primary debate ====
2014 Idaho attorney general Republican primary debate
No.	Date	Host	Moderator	Link	Republican	Republican
Key: P Participant A Absent N Not invited I Invited W Withdrawn						
Key: P Participant A Absent N Not invited I Invited W Withdrawn					Lawrence Wasden	Chris Troupis
1	April 30, 2014	IdahoPTV	Aaron Kunz	PBS	P	P

==== Primary results ====
Republican primary results
Party	Candidate	Votes	%
Republican	Lawrence Wasden (incumbent)	83,850	59.1
Republican	Chris Troupis	58,025	40.9
Total votes		141,875	100

=== Democratic Nominee ===
==== Nominated ====
- Bruce Bistline, attorney.

Democratic primary results
Party	Candidate	Votes	%
Democratic	Bruce Bistline	23,345	100
Total votes		23,345	100

=== General election ===
==== Polling ====
Poll source	Date(s) administered	Sample size	Margin of error	Lawrence Wasden (R)	Bruce Bistline (D)	Undecided
Public Policy Polling	October 30–November 2, 2014	1,001	± 3.1%	64%	27%	9%
Public Policy Polling	October 9–12, 2014	522	± 4.3%	52%	26%	22%

==== Results ====
Idaho Attorney General election, 2014
Party	Candidate	Votes	%
Republican	Lawrence Wasden (incumbent)	289,762	68.0
Democratic	Bruce Bistline	136,081	32.0
Total votes		425,843	100.0
Republican hold			

== Secretary of State ==
Incumbent Republican Secretary of State Ben Ysursa did not run for re-election to a fourth term in office. Former Speaker of the Idaho House of Representatives Lawerence Denney won the Republican primary and would go on to win in November.

Idaho Secretary of State election, 2014
Party	Candidate	Votes	%
Republican	Lawerence Denney	241,851	56.2
Democratic	Holli Woodings	188,353	43.8
Total votes		430,204	100.0
Republican hold			

== Treasurer ==
2014 Idaho state treasurer election
- November 4, 2014

Nominee	Ron Crane	Deborah Silver
Party	Republican	Democratic
Popular vote	260,044	166,487
Percentage	61.0%	39.0%
- County results Crane: 50–60% 60–70% 70–80% 80–90% Silver: 50–60% 60–70%
Treasurer before election
Ron Crane
Republican
Elected Treasurer
Ron Crane
Republican

Incumbent Republican treasurer Ron Crane won a fifth term in office.

=== Republican Nominee ===
==== Nominated ====
- Ron Crane, incumbent treasurer.

==== Primary results ====
Republican primary results
Party	Candidate	Votes	%
Republican	Ron Crane (incumbent)	124,426	100.0
Total votes		124,426	100.0

=== Democratic primary ===
==== Candidates ====
- Deborah Silver, accountant.
- W. Lane Startin, freelance writer and Green Party nominee for Nevada's 1st congressional district in 2002.

==== Primary debate ====
2014 Idaho attorney general Democratic primary debate
No.	Date	Host	Moderator	Link	Democratic	Democratic
Key: P Participant A Absent N Not invited I Invited W Withdrawn						
Key: P Participant A Absent N Not invited I Invited W Withdrawn					Deborah Silver	W. Lane Startin
1	May 1, 2014	IdahoPTV	Aaron Kunz	PBS	P	P

==== Primary results ====
Democratic primary results
Party	Candidate	Votes	%
Democratic	Deborah Silver	19,987	84.0
Democratic	W. Lane Startin	3,803	16.0
Total votes		23,790	100.0

=== General election ===
==== Polling ====
Poll source	Date(s) administered	Sample size	Margin of error	Ron Crane (R)	Deborah Silver (D)	Undecided
Public Policy Polling	October 30–November 2, 2014	1,001	± 3.1%	55%	36%	9%
Public Policy Polling	October 9–12, 2014	522	± 4.3%	46%	32%	22%

==== Debate ====
2014 Idaho state treasurer election debate
No.	Date	Host	Moderator	Link	Republican	Democratic
Key: P Participant A Absent N Not invited I Invited W Withdrawn						
Key: P Participant A Absent N Not invited I Invited W Withdrawn					Ron Crane	Deborah Silver
1	October 14, 2014	IdahoPTV	Aaron Kunz	PBS	P	P

==== Results ====
Idaho state treasurer election, 2014
Party	Candidate	Votes	%
Republican	Ron Crane (incumbent)	260,044	61.0
Democratic	Deborah Silver	166,487	39.0
Total votes		426,531	100.0
Republican hold			

== Controller ==
2014 Idaho state controller election
- November 4, 2014
Nominee	Brandon Woolf
Party	Republican
Popular vote	342,013
Percentage	100%
Controller before election
Brandon Woolf
Republican
Elected Controller
Brandon Woolf
Republican

Incumbent Republican controller Brandon Woolf was appointed by Governor Otter in 2012 after Donna Jones resigned following an automobile accident. No Democrat filed to run for this race.

=== Republican primary ===
==== Candidates ====
- Brandon Woolf, incumbent controller.
- Todd Hatfield, former vice chairman of the Idaho Republican Party and candidate for controller in 2010.

==== Primary debate ====
2014 Idaho state controller Republican primary debate
No.	Date	Host	Moderator	Link	Republican	Republican
Key: P Participant A Absent N Not invited I Invited W Withdrawn						
Key: P Participant A Absent N Not invited I Invited W Withdrawn					Brandon Woolf	Todd Hatfield
1	May 1, 2014	IdahoPTV	Melissa Davlin	PBS	P	P

==== Primary results ====
Republican Primary results by county: Woolf: 50–60%; 60–70%; 70–80%; Hatfield: 50–60%; 60–70%; 70–80%

Republican primary results
Party	Candidate	Votes	%
Republican	Brandon Woolf (incumbent)	68,609	50.9
Republican	Todd Hatfield	66,126	49.1
Total votes		134,735	100.0

=== General election ===
Idaho State Controller election, 2014
Party	Candidate	Votes	%
Republican	Brandon Woolf (incumbent)	342,013	100.0
Total votes		342,013	100.0
Republican hold			

== Superintendent of Public Instruction ==
2014 Idaho Superintendent of Public Instruction election
- November 4, 2014
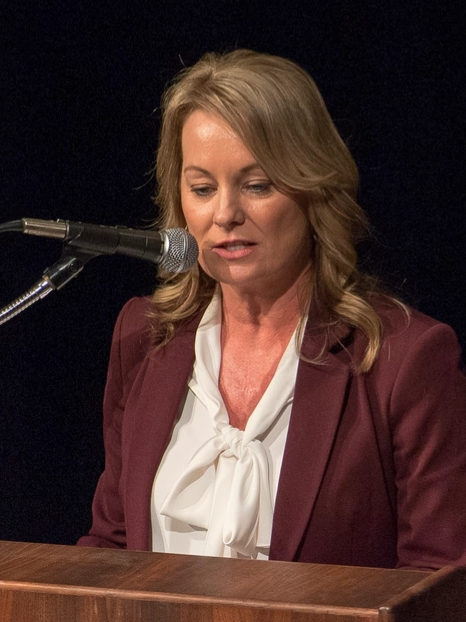

Nominee	Sherri Ybarra	Jana Jones
Party	Republican	Democratic
Popular vote	217,049	211,483
Percentage	50.6%	49.4%
- Ybarra: 50–60% 60–70% 70–80% 80–90% >90% Jones: 50–60% 60–70% 70–80% 80–90% Tie: 50%
Superintendent of Public Instruction before election
Tom Luna
Republican
Elected Superintendent of Public Instruction
Sherri Ybarra
Republican

Incumbent Republican Superintendent of Public Instruction Tom Luna did not run for re-election to a third term in office.

=== Republican Primary ===
==== Declared candidates ====
- John Eynon, teacher.
- Andrew Grover, Melba School District Superintendent.
- Randy Jensen, middle school principal from American Falls.
- Sherri Ybarra, educator.

==== Declined ====
- Roger Quarles, former chief deputy superintendent.
- Steve Smylie, former state representative.
- Melinda Smyser, former state senator.
- Steven Thayn, state representative.
- Jeffrey Thompson, state representative.
- Heather Williams, Gooding School District Superintendent.

==== Primary debate ====
2014 Idaho Superintendent of Public Instruction Republican primary debate
No.	Date	Host	Moderator	Link	Republican	Republican	Republican	Republican
Key: P Participant A Absent N Not invited I Invited W Withdrawn								
Key: P Participant A Absent N Not invited I Invited W Withdrawn					Sherri Ybarra	Randy Jensen	Andrew Grover	John Eynon
1	May 7, 2014	IdahoPTV	Aaron Kunz	PBS	P	P	P	P

==== Primary results ====
Republican primary results
Party	Candidate	Votes	%
Republican	Sherri Ybarra	38,604	28.7
Republican	Randy Jensen	32,948	24.5
Republican	John Eynon	32,521	24.1
Republican	Andrew Grover	30,569	22.7
Total votes		134,642	100.0

=== Democratic Nominee ===
==== Nominated ====
- Jana Jones, former chief deputy superintendent and Democratic nominee in 2006.

==== Primary results ====
Democratic primary results
Party	Candidate	Votes	%
Democratic	Jana Jones	24,814	100.0
Total votes		24,814	100.0

=== General election ===
==== Polling ====
Poll source	Date(s) administered	Sample size	Margin of error	Sherri Ybarra (R)	Jana Jones (D)	Undecided
Public Policy Polling	October 30–November 2, 2014	1,001	± 3.1%	46%	45%	9%
Public Policy Polling	October 9–12, 2014	522	± 4.3%	41%	38%	21%

==== Debate ====
2014 Idaho Superintendent of Public Instruction election debate
No.	Date	Host	Moderator	Link	Republican	Democratic
Key: P Participant A Absent N Not invited I Invited W Withdrawn						
Key: P Participant A Absent N Not invited I Invited W Withdrawn					Sherri Ybarra	Jana Jones
1	October 20, 2014	IdahoPTV	Aaron Kunz	PBS	P	P

==== Results ====
Idaho Superintendent of Public Instruction election, 2014
Party	Candidate	Votes	%
Republican	Sherri Ybarra	217,049	50.6
Democratic	Jana Jones	211,483	49.4
Total votes		428,532	100.0
Republican hold			

===== By congressional district =====
Despite losing the election, Jones won the second congressional district.

District	Ybarra	Jones	Representative
1st	56%	44%	Raúl Labrador
2nd	45%	55%	Mike Simpson

== Judicial seats ==
=== Supreme Court ===
Two incumbent justices on the Idaho Supreme Court were up for election.

Justice Warren Jones who has been serving since 2007 ran unopposed and won another term. On the other hand, justice Joel Horton faced a challenger.

==== Horton's seat ====
2014 Idaho Supreme Court Justice election
- May 20, 2014

Nominee	Joel Horton	William Seiniger
Party	Nonpartisan	Nonpartisan
Popular vote	104,339	54,155
Percentage	65.83%	34.17%
- County results Horton: 50–60% 60–70% 70–80%
Justice before election
Joel Horton
Nonpartisan
Elected Justice
Joel Horton
Nonpartisan

Horton was challenged by Boise attorney William "Breck" Seiniger in his bid for re-election. He won with 65% of the votes, allowing him to serve another six-year term on the court.

===== Candidates =====
- Joel Horton, incumbent justice.
- William "Breck" Seiniger, attorney.

===== Debate =====
2014 Idaho Supreme Court election debate
No.	Date	Host	Moderator	Link	Nonpartisan	Nonpartisan
Key: P Participant A Absent N Not invited I Invited W Withdrawn						
Key: P Participant A Absent N Not invited I Invited W Withdrawn					Joel Horton	William Seiniger
1	May 8, 2014	IdahoPTV	Melissa Davlin	PBS	P	P

===== Results =====
2014 Idaho Supreme Court Justice election
Party	Candidate	Votes	%
Nonpartisan	Joel D. Horton (incumbent)	104,339	65.8%
Nonpartisan	William Seiniger	54,155	34.2%
Total votes		158,494	100%

=== Court of Appeals ===
Incumbent Idaho Court of Appeals judge Sergio Gutierrez ran unopposed and secured another term.

== State legislature ==
All 35 seats of the Idaho Senate and 70 seats of the Idaho House of Representatives were up for election.

=== Idaho Senate ===
Party	Before	After	Change
Republican	28	28	Steady
Democratic	7	7	Steady
Total	35	35	

=== Idaho House of Representatives ===
Party	Before	After	Change
Republican	57	56	▼1
Democratic	13	14	▲1
Total	70	70	

== Ballot measure ==
=== HJR 2 (2014) ===
Results by county: Yes: 50–60%; 60–70%; No: 50–60%

The Idaho Legislative Delegation of Rulemaking Amendment, HJR 2 sought to empower the state legislature to delegate rulemaking authorities to executive agencies and to approve or reject the administrative rules devised by those agencies. It was narrowly defeated by a margin of four thousand votes.

Idaho HJR 2 (2014)
Choice	Votes	%
For	201,231	49.42
Against	205,936	50.58
Total	407,167	100.00

== See also ==
- Elections in Idaho
- Politics of Idaho
- Political party strength in Idaho
