= 2022 Idaho Attorney General election =

- November 8, 2022
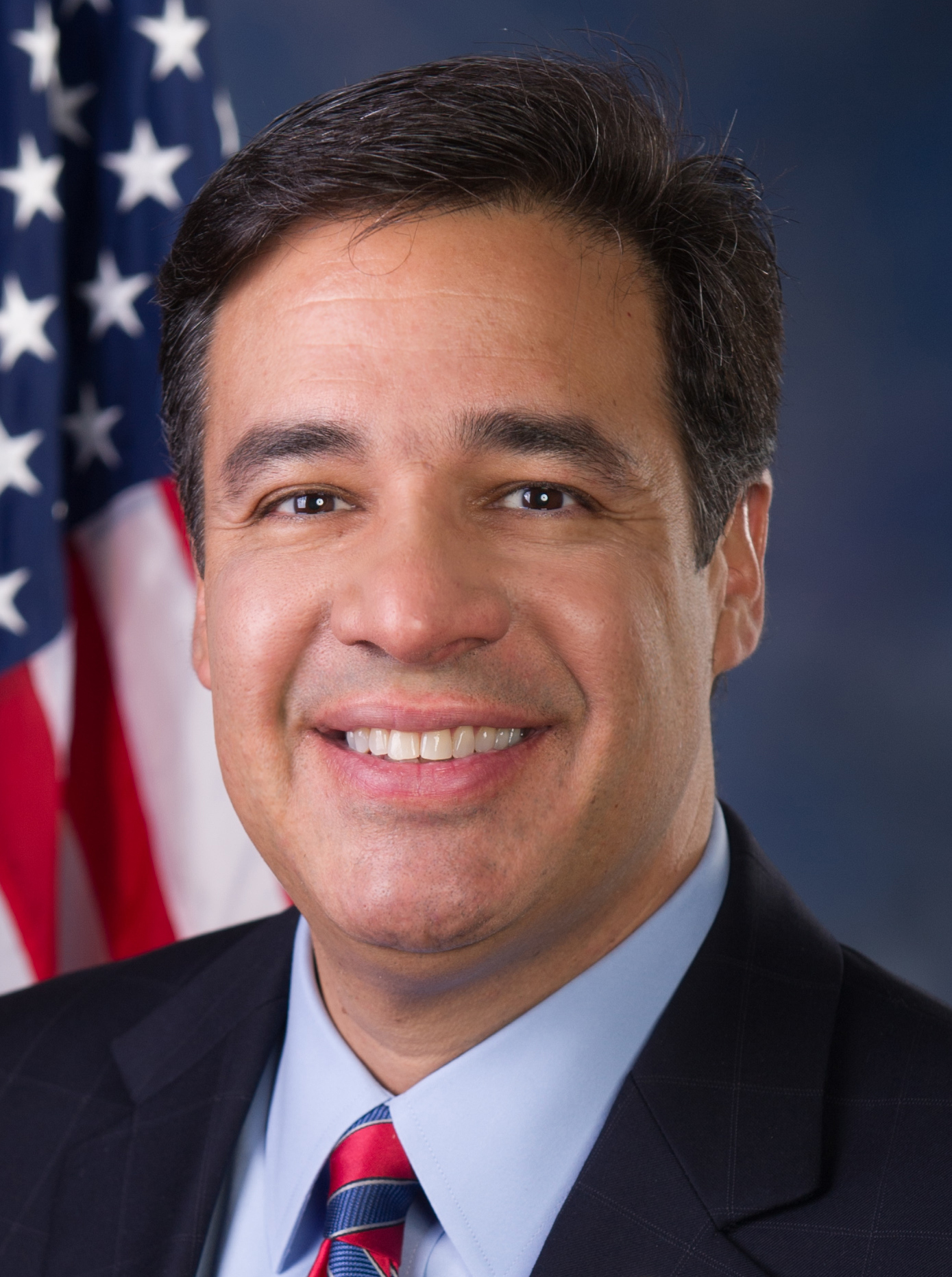

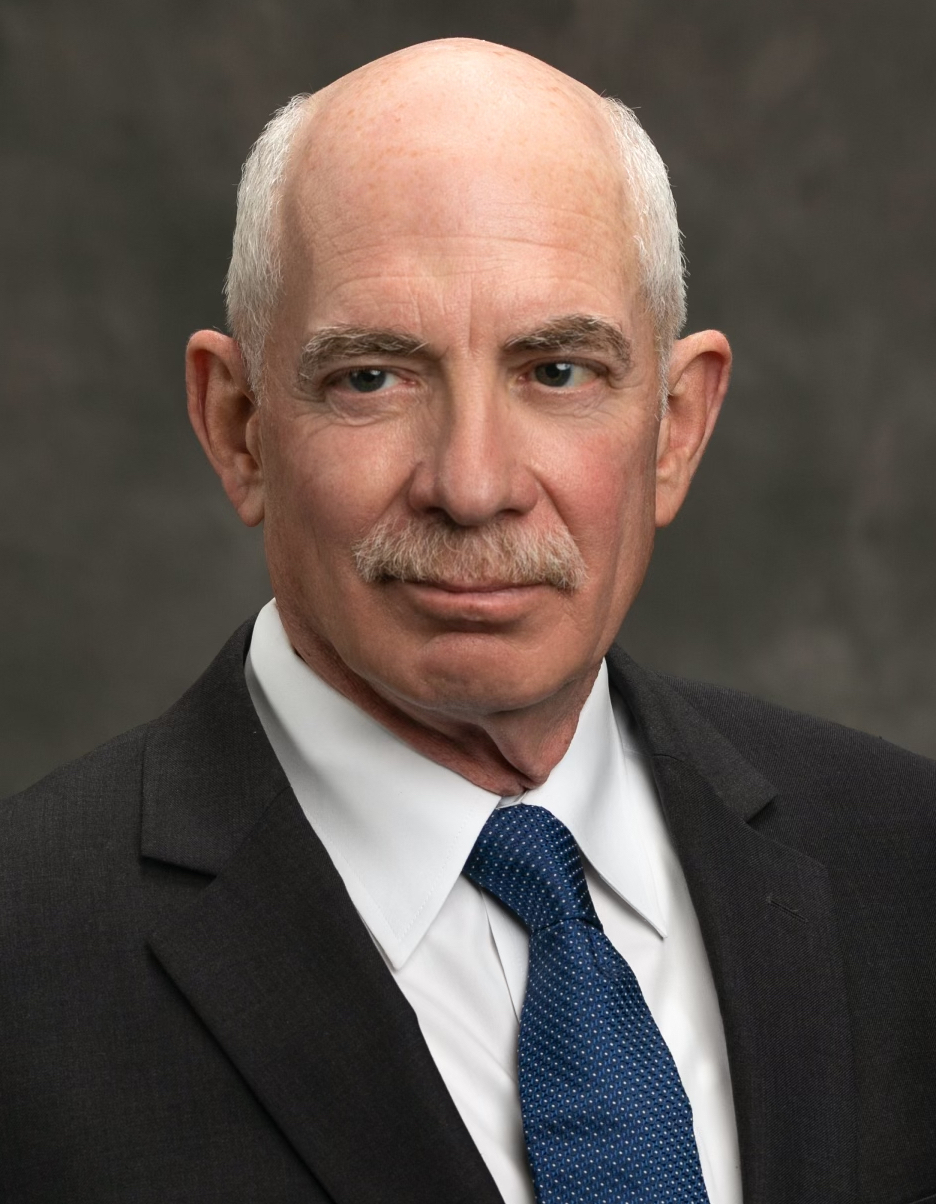
| Nominee | Raúl Labrador | Tom Arkoosh |
| Party | Republican | Democratic |
| Popular vote | 367,579 | 219,401 |
| Percentage | 62.62% | 37.38% |
- Labrador: 50–60% 60–70% 70–80% 80–90% Arkoosh: 50–60% 70–80%
Attorney General before election
Lawrence Wasden
Republican
Elected Attorney General
Raúl Labrador
Republican

The 2022 Idaho Attorney General election took place on November 8, 2022, to elect the next Attorney General of Idaho. Incumbent Republican Attorney General Lawrence Wasden sought a sixth term in office, but was defeated in the Republican primary on May 17. Former Republican congressman Raúl Labrador won the general election, defeating Democratic candidate Tom Arkoosh.

Although Labrador comfortably won, with a victory margin of only 25.24%, this was the weakest performance by a Republican, and the strongest performance a Democrat performed since 2014. This was also the first time since 2002 Ada County voted for the Democratic candidate in an Attorney General election.

== Republican primary ==
=== Candidates ===
==== Nominated ====
- Raúl Labrador, U.S. Representative for Idaho's 1st congressional district (2011–2019) and candidate for governor in 2018

==== Eliminated in primary ====
- Arthur Macomber, attorney
- Lawrence Wasden, incumbent attorney general

==== Failed to file ====
- Dennis Boyles, attorney

==== Endorsements ====
Raúl Labrador

Executive branch officials

- Mike Pompeo, former Secretary of State (2018–2021), former Director of the CIA (2017–2018), former U.S. Representative from Kansas's 4th congressional district (2011–2017)

U.S. Senators

- Ted Cruz, U.S. Senator from Texas (2013–present) and candidate for president in 2016

Organizations

- Conservative Political Action Conference (CPAC)
- Conservatives of Idaho
Lawerence Wasden

U.S. Representatives

- Mike Simpson, U.S. Representative from Idaho's 2nd congressional district (1999–)

Governors

- Phil Batt, former governor of Idaho (1995–1999)
- Dirk Kempthorne, former governor of Idaho (1999–2006)
- Brad Little, Governor of Idaho (2019–present)
- C.L. "Butch" Otter, former governor of Idaho (2007–2019)

Attorneys general

- Jim Jones, former attorney general of Idaho (1983–1991), former justice of the Idaho Supreme Court (2005–2017)

Organizations

- NRA Political Victory Fund

==== Polling ====
| Poll source | Date(s) administered | Sample size (Note: Key: A – all adults RV – registered voters LV – likely voters V – unclear) | Margin of error | Raul Labrador | Art Macomber | Lawrence Wasden | Undecided |
|---|---|---|---|---|---|---|---|
| Remington Research Group (R) | May 2–3, 2022 | 1,033 (LV) | ± 3.0% | 43% | 6% | 34% | 17% |
| Zoldak Research (R) | April 9–12, 2022 | 549 (LV) | ± 4.0% | 36% | 4% | 33% | 27% |
| WPA Intelligence (R) (Note: Poll sponsored by Club for Growth Action) | March 7–9, 2022 | 500 (LV) | ± 4.4% | 35% | 2% | 14% | 49% |

=== Results ===
Results by county Labrador: 40–50%; 50–60%; 60–70%; 70–80%; Wasden: 40–50%; 50–60%

Republican primary results
| Party | Candidate | Votes | % |
|---|---|---|---|
| Republican | Raúl Labrador | 140,576 | 51.6 |
| Republican | Lawrence Wasden (incumbent) | 103,390 | 37.9 |
| Republican | Arthur Macomber | 28,757 | 10.5 |
| Total votes | | 272,723 | 100.0 |

== Democratic primary ==
=== Candidates ===
==== Replacement nominee ====
- Tom Arkoosh, attorney

==== Withdrew after nomination ====
- Steven Scanlin, attorney

=== Results ===
Democratic primary results
| Party | Candidate | Votes | % |
|---|---|---|---|
| Democratic | Steven Scanlin | 31,620 | 100.0 |
| Total votes | | 31,620 | 100.0 |

On July 18, Scanlin withdrew from the race. Boise attorney Tom Arkoosh took his place on the general election ballot for November.

== General election ==
=== Debate ===
2022 Idaho Attorney General debate
| No. | Date | Host | Moderator | Link | Republican | Democratic |
| Key: P Participant A Absent N Not invited I Invited W Withdrawn | | | | | | |
| Key: P Participant A Absent N Not invited I Invited W Withdrawn | | | | | Raúl Labrador | Tom Arkoosh |
|---|---|---|---|---|---|---|
| 1 | Oct. 25, 2022 | Idaho Public Television | Melissa Davlin | YouTube | P | P |

=== Predictions ===
| Source | Ranking | As of |
|---|---|---|
| Sabato's Crystal Ball | Lean R | November 3, 2022 |
| Elections Daily | Safe R | November 1, 2022 |

=== Endorsements ===
Raúl Labrador

Executive branch officials

- Mike Pompeo, former Secretary of State (2018–2021), former Director of the CIA (2017–2018), former U.S. Representative from Kansas's 4th congressional district (2011–2017)

U.S. Senators

- Ted Cruz, U.S. Senator from Texas (2013–present) and candidate for President in 2016

State officials

- David Leroy, former Lieutenant Governor of Idaho (1983–1987) and former Idaho Attorney General (1979–1983)

Organizations

- Conservative Political Action Conference (CPAC)
- Conservatives of Idaho
Tom Arkoosh

State officials

- Phil Batt, former Governor of Idaho (1995–1999) (Republican)
- Jerry Evans, former Superintendent of Public Instruction (1979–1995) (Republican)
- Dave High, former deputy Idaho Attorney General
- Jim Jones, former attorney general of Idaho (1983–1991), former justice of the Idaho Supreme Court (2005–2017) (Republican)
- Lydia Justice-Edwards, former Treasurer of Idaho (1987–1999) (Republican)
- W. Anthony Park, former Idaho Attorney General (1971–1975)
- Ben Ysursa, former Idaho Secretary of State (2003–2015) (Republican)

State legislators

- Pam Ahrens, former state representative (Republican)
- Max Black, former state representative (1993–2012) (Republican)
- Cherie Buckner-Webb, former state senator (2012–2020)
- Charles Coiner, former state senator (2004–2010) (Republican)
- Judi Danielson, former Republican state senator (1995–2001) (Independent)
- Denton Darrington, former state senator (1982–2012) (Republican)
- Jerry Deckard, former state representative (Republican)
- Bob Fry, former state representative (Republican)
- Cindy Haagenson, former state representative (Republican)
- Dean Haagenson, former state representative (Republican)
- Patti Anne Lodge, state senator for Idaho's 11th legislative district (Republican)
- Fred Martin, state senator for Idaho's 15th legislative district (Republican)
- Beverly Montgomery, former state representative (1998–2002) (Republican)
- Kathleen Noh, former state senator
- Laird Noh, former state senator
- Bill Ringert, former state senator (1982–1988) (Republican)
- Joe Stegner, former state senator (1998–2011)
- Scott Syme, seat A representative for Idaho's 11th legislative district (Republican)
- Rich Wills, former state representative (2012–2016) (Republican)
- Fred Wood, seat B representative for Idaho's 27th legislative district (Republican)

Organizations

- Idaho Education Association

Individuals

- Lori Otter, former First Lady of Idaho (2007–2019) (Republican)
- Eric Peterson, former chair of the Nez Perce County Republicans (Republican)
- Gary Raney, former Ada County sheriff (Republican)

=== Results ===
Idaho Attorney General election, 2022
| Party | Candidate | Votes | % |
|---|---|---|---|
| Republican | Raúl Labrador | 367,579 | 62.6% |
| Democratic | Tom Arkoosh | 219,405 | 37.4% |
| Total votes | | 586,984 | 100% |
| Republican hold | | | |

==== By county ====
| County | Raul Labrador Republican | | Tom Arkoosh Democratic | |
| County | # | % | # | % |
|---|---|---|---|---|
| Ada | 88,131 | 48.00% | 95,467 | 52.00% |
| Adams | 1,476 | 74.32% | 510 | 25.68% |
| Bannock | 14,198 | 56.06% | 11,130 | 43.94% |
| Bear Lake | 1,959 | 87.81% | 272 | 12.19% |
| Benewah | 2,823 | 82.91% | 582 | 17.09% |
| Bingham | 9,428 | 77.15% | 2,792 | 22.85% |
| Blaine | 2,837 | 29.28% | 6,851 | 70.72% |
| Boise | 2,455 | 72.08% | 951 | 27.92% |
| Bonner | 14,525 | 70.17% | 6,174 | 29.83% |
| Bonneville | 23,062 | 68.13% | 11,042 | 31.87% |
| Boundary | 4,212 | 81.33% | 967 | 18.67% |
| Butte | 807 | 82.52% | 171 | 17.48% |
| Camas | 338 | 65.89% | 175 | 34.11% |
| Canyon | 39,380 | 68.23% | 18,339 | 31.77% |
| Caribou | 1,681 | 80.70% | 402 | 19.30% |
| Cassia | 4,590 | 79.47% | 1,186 | 20.53% |
| Clark | 160 | 80.40% | 39 | 19.60% |
| Clearwater | 2,420 | 78.22% | 674 | 21.78% |
| Custer | 1,490 | 75.18% | 492 | 24.82% |
| Elmore | 4,551 | 69.88% | 1,962 | 30.12% |
| Franklin | 3,821 | 89.36% | 455 | 10.64% |
| Fremont | 3,379 | 79.94% | 848 | 20.06% |
| Gem | 5,757 | 76.58% | 1,761 | 23.42% |
| Gooding | 2,732 | 68.16% | 1,276 | 31.84% |
| Idaho | 6,020 | 81.04% | 1,408 | 18.96% |
| Jefferson | 7,510 | 83.19% | 1,517 | 16.81% |
| Jerome | 3,367 | 69.78% | 1,458 | 30.22% |
| Kootenai | 46,424 | 74.73% | 15,696 | 25.27% |
| Latah | 7,223 | 48.32% | 7,725 | 51.68% |
| Lemhi | 2,716 | 75.30% | 891 | 24.70% |
| Lewis | 1,059 | 77.81% | 302 | 22.19% |
| Lincoln | 902 | 68.39% | 417 | 31.61% |
| Madison | 6,649 | 80.80% | 1,580 | 19.20% |
| Minidoka | 3,592 | 76.69% | 1,092 | 23.31% |
| Nez Perce | 8,567 | 63.99% | 4,821 | 36.01% |
| Oneida | 1,378 | 86.56% | 214 | 13.44% |
| Owyhee | 2,586 | 79.20% | 679 | 20.80% |
| Payette | 5,847 | 77.57% | 1,691 | 22.43% |
| Power | 1,337 | 68.25% | 622 | 31.75% |
| Shoshone | 2,914 | 71.47% | 1,163 | 28.53% |
| Teton | 2,078 | 44.86% | 2,554 | 55.14% |
| Twin Falls | 15,009 | 66.31% | 7,625 | 33.69% |
| Valley | 2,680 | 51.61% | 2,513 | 48.39% |
| Washington | 2,969 | 76.36% | 919 | 23.64% |
| Totals | 367,579 | 62.62% | 219,405 | 37.38% |

Counties that flipped from Republican to Democratic

- Ada (largest municipality: Boise)

==== By congressional district ====
Labrador won both congressional districts.

| District | Labrador | Arkoosh | Representative |
|---|---|---|---|
| 1st | 69% | 31% | Russ Fulcher |
| 2nd | 56% | 44% | Mike Simpson |

== See also ==
- Idaho Attorney General

== Notes ==
Partisan clients
