= Idaho State Department of Education =

Executive agency of the Idaho state education system

Idaho Department of Education

Agency overview
- Headquarters: Boise, Idaho
- Agency executive: Debbie Critchfield, Idaho Superintendent of Public Instruction
- Parent agency: Idaho State Board of Education
- Website: https://www.sde.idaho.gov/

The Idaho Department of Education is an executive agency of the Idaho state education system. The department is responsible for public elementary and secondary school matters as provided by Title 33, Idaho Code, or as determined by the Idaho State Board of Education. It is headquartered in the state capital, Boise, Idaho.

The Idaho Department of Education is helmed by the Idaho Superintendent of Public Instruction, an elected official.

Each year the Idaho Department of Education serves more than 300,000 students, at 736 schools, across 115 districts.

== Superintendents of Public Instruction ==
The Idaho Superintendent of Public Instruction is an elected official and chief executive officer of the Idaho Department of Education responsible for carrying out the policies, procedures, and duties authorized by law or established by the Board for all public elementary and secondary school matters.

The office of superintendent is established in the Idaho Constitution Article IV, Section 1; "The executive department shall consist of a governor, lieutenant governor, secretary of state, state controller, state treasurer, attorney general and superintendent of public instruction, each of whom shall hold his office for four years beginning on the first Monday in January next after his election, commencing with those elected in the year 1946..."

Before 1946, Idaho superintendents of public instruction were elected every two years.

Idaho Superintendent of Public Instruction

State Government (1890–present)
Name	Party affiliation	Tenure	Notes
Critchfield, Debbie	R	01/02/2023 to present	Elected 2022
Ybarra, Sherri	R	01/05/2015 to 01/02/2023	Elected 2014; reelected 2018
Luna, Tom	R	01/01/2007 to 1/04/2015	Elected 2006; reelected 2010
Howard, Marilyn	D	01/04/1999 to 01/01/2007	Elected 1998; reelected 2002
Fox, Anne C.	R	01/02/1995 to 01/04/1999	Elected 1994
Evans, Jerry L.	R	01/01/1979 to 01/02/1995	Elected 1978; reelected 1982, 1986, 1990
Truby, Roy F.	D	01/06/1975 to 01/01/1979	Elected 1974
Engelking, D.F.	D	01/05/1959 to 01/06/1975	Elected 1958; reelected 1962, 1966, 1970
Jones, Alton B.	R	01/06/1947 to 01/05/1959	Elected 1946; reelected 1950, 1954
Sullivan, G.C.	D	01/01/1945 to 01/06/1947	Elected 1944
Chatburn, Acel H.	R	03/13/1944 to 01/01/1945	Appointed to fill vacancy
Roberts, C.E.	D	01/06/1941 to 03/13/1944	Elected 1940; reelected 1942; resigned 3/13/1944
Condie, John W.	D	01/02/1933 to 01/06/1941	Elected 1932; reelected 1934, 1936, 1938
Davis, Myrtle R.	R	01/07/1929 to 01/02/1933	Elected 1928; reelected 1930
Lyman, Mabelle McConnell	R	01/03/1927 to 01/07/1929	Elected 1926
Russum, Elizabeth	R	01/01/1923 to 01/03/1927	Elected 1922; reelected 1924
Redfield, Ethel E.	R	01/01/1917 to 01/01/1923	Elected 1916; reelected 1918, 1920
McCoy, Bernice	R	01/04/1915 to 01/01/1917	Elected 1914
Shepherd, Grace M.	R	01/02/1911 to 01/04/1915	Elected 1910; reelected 1913
Chamberlain, S. Belle	R	01/07/1907 to 01/02/1911	Elected 1906; reelected 1908
Scott, May L.	R	01/05/1903 to 01/07/1907	Elected 1902; reelected 1904
French, Permeal	D	01/01/1899 to 01/05/1903	Elected 1898; reelected 1900
Anderson, Louis N.B.	P-D	01/04/1897 to 01/02/1899	Elected 1896
Foresman, C.A.	R	01/07/1895 to 01/04/1897	Elected 1894
Lower, B.B.	R	01/02/1893 to 01/07/1895	Elected 1892
Harroun, Joseph	R	01/05/1891 to 01/02/1893	Elected 1890

Territorial Government (1863–1890)
Name	Start date
Stevenson, Charles C.	11 February 1889
Moody, Silas W.	11 February 1887
Bishop, W.R.	25 July 1866
Chittenden, J.R.	23 December 1864

== Organization ==
Following is the management hierarchy for the Idaho Department of Education.

Office of the Superintendent

- Superintendent of Public Instruction
  - Chief Deputy Superintendent
    - Deputy Superintendent, Operations
    - Deputy Superintendent, Communications and Policy

Communications and Policy

- Deputy Superintendent, Communications and Policy

Operations

- Deputy Superintendent, Operations
  - Director, Accountability
  - Director, Assessment
  - Director, Federal Programs
  - Director, Content and Curriculum
  - Director, Special Education
  - Coordinator, School Choice
  - Coordinator, Indian Education

Management and Educational Services

- Chief Deputy Superintendent
  - Management Assistant
  - Chief Financial Officer, Public School Finance
  - Associate Deputy, Chief Financial Officer
  - Contracts and Procurement Officer
  - Director, Certification and Professional Standards
  - Director, Student Engagement and Safety Coordination
  - Director, Child Nutrition Programs
  - Director, Student Transportation
  - Director, Human Resources and Employment

== Responsibilities ==
The Idaho Department of Education implements policies, distributes funds, administers statewide assessments, licenses educators, and provides accountability data for all kindergarten through grade-12 public instruction.

Idaho K-12 charter schools are managed by the Idaho Public Charter School Commission and abide by independent reporting and funding procedures, however, the Idaho Department of Education works closely with the commission to ensure access, equability, and accountability across all Idaho education efforts. This extends to the inclusion of charter schools in the Idaho Schools "report card" tool, which aggregates performance, progress, and enrollment data for all Idaho public schools.

== Programs ==
The Idaho Department of Education supports Idaho schools and students through its work in fourteen areas.

- Accounting
- Assessment & Accountability
  - Idaho Reading Indicator
  - ISAT Comprehensive Assessment System
- Certification and Professional Standards
- Child Nutrition Programs
  - Child and Adult Care Food Program
  - School Meals Programs
  - Summer Food Service Program
- Content & Curriculum
  - Idaho Content Standards
- Federal Programs
  - Educator Effectiveness
  - English Learner Program/Title III
  - Title I, Title II, Title IV, Title V, Title IX
- Idaho Indian Education
- Mastery Education
- Public School Finance
- School Choice
  - Alternative Schools
  - Home School
  - Magnet School
- Special Education
  - Results Driven Accountability Monitoring System
- Student Engagement & Safety Coordination
  - Advanced Opportunities
  - Driver Education
  - Idaho Lives Project (in collaboration with the Idaho Department of Health and Welfare)
  - School Health Services Program
- Student Transportation
- Technology Services
  - E-rate
  - Broadband Program

== Challenges ==
Of the 44 counties in Idaho, seven are urban and 37 are rural as classified by the Idaho Department of Labor. That translates to three quarters of the school districts in Idaho being recognized as rural, per the Idaho statute definition. The schools in these rural areas are regularly challenged to find and retain effective teachers to meet the needs of all of their students, transport students quickly and safely to and from school, and respond to unexpected personnel or technology needs in order to deliver uninterrupted instruction.

In 2021, the statewide high school graduation rate was 80.1 percent while the college enrollment rate was 37 percent. In rural schools, these rates tend to be lower.

== Idaho State Board of Education ==
The general supervision, governance, and control of the state educational institutions and public school system of the State of Idaho, as with the education system's executive agencies, are vested in the Idaho State Board of Education (SBOE). State statute requires that this Board "...shall consist of the state superintendent of public instruction, who shall be an ex officio voting member and who shall serve as executive secretary of the board for all elementary and secondary school matters..."

The Idaho State Board of Education is the State Educational Agency.

Board Members may be contacted through the Office of the State Board of Education. Current members of the Board include:

- Dr. Linda Clark
- Bill Gilbert
- Shawn Keough
- Kurt Liebich
- David Turnbull
- Cally Roach
- Cindy Siddoway
- Debbie Critchfield
