= Debbie Critchfield =

American politician (born 1970)

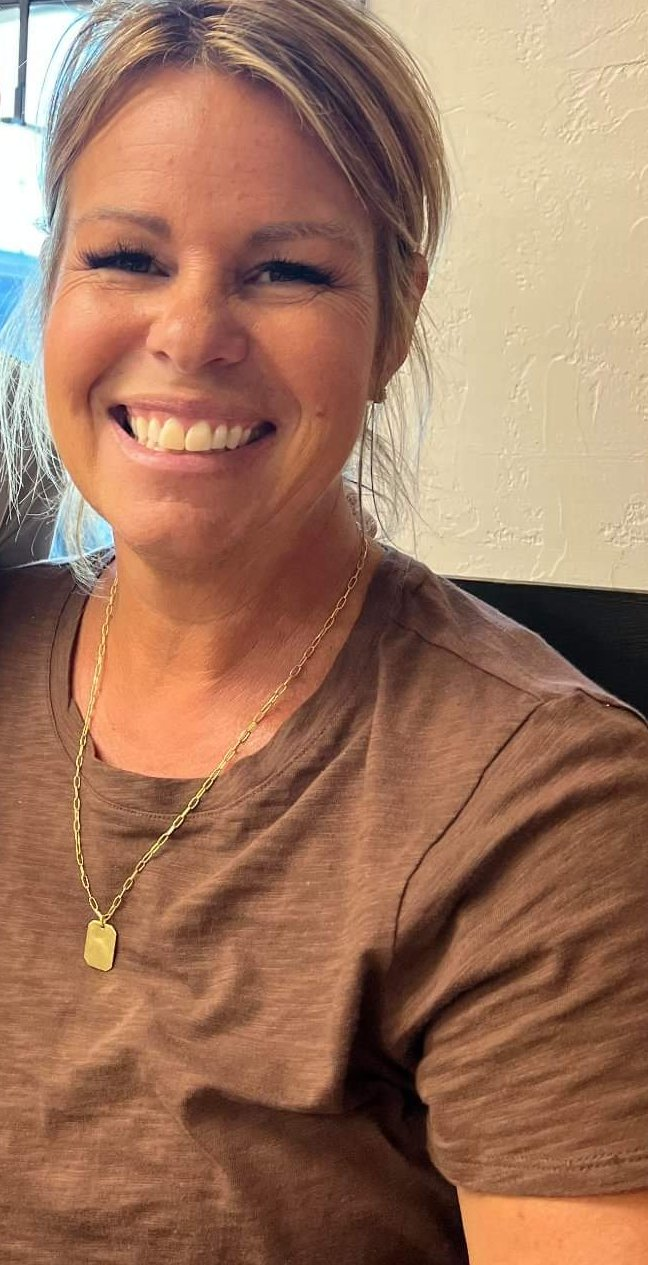

Idaho Superintendent of Public Instruction
- Incumbent
- Assumed office January 2, 2023
- Governor: Brad Little
- Preceded by: Sherri Ybarra

Personal details
- Born: April 9, 1970 (age 56) Ogden, Utah, U.S.
- Party: Republican
- Spouse: Dave Critchfield
- Education: Brigham Young University (BA)
- Website: Campaign website

Debbie Critchfield (born April 9, 1970) is an American politician. She has served as the superintendent of public instruction of Idaho since 2023. Critchfield was previously the president of the Idaho State Board of Education. She is a member of the Republican Party.

== Early life and career ==
Critchfield was born in Ogden, Utah on April 9, 1970. She was raised in San Diego, California, and attended Brigham Young University, earning a Bachelor of Arts in Political Science. She married Dave Critchfield, a native of Oakley, Idaho, and moved to Idaho with him, where they raised four children in Cassia County.

In Oakley, Critchfield worked as a substitute teacher for six years. She won a seat on the school board and served for ten years, including five as chair. Governor of Idaho Butch Otter appointed her to the state board of education in 2014. She served as the president of the board from 2019 to 2021.

== State Superintendent of Public Instruction ==
Critchfield ran for superintendent of public instruction in the 2022 elections. She won the primary election in May, defeating Branden Durst and Sherri Ybarra, the incumbent superintendent. She won the general election against Terry Gilbert, the Democratic Party nominee.

In 2023, Critchfield worked alongside James Petzke, a member of the Idaho House of Representatives, on legislation to require Idaho high school students to take financial literacy classes.

== 2022 State Superintendent Election ==
Critchfield ran for the Republican Primary and won on May 17, 2022

Candidate	Vote Share	Votes
Debbie Critchfield	39.7%	105,070
Branden Durst	33.8%	89,451
Sherri Ybarra	26.6%	70,431

Critchfield ran in the General Election and won on November 8, 2022

Candidate	Vote Share	Votes
Debbie Critchfield	69.8%	404,549
Terry Gilbert	30.2%	175,076

Political offices
Preceded by Sherri Ybarra	Idaho Superintendent of Public Instruction; 2023–present	Incumbent
