= Sherri Ybarra =

American politician

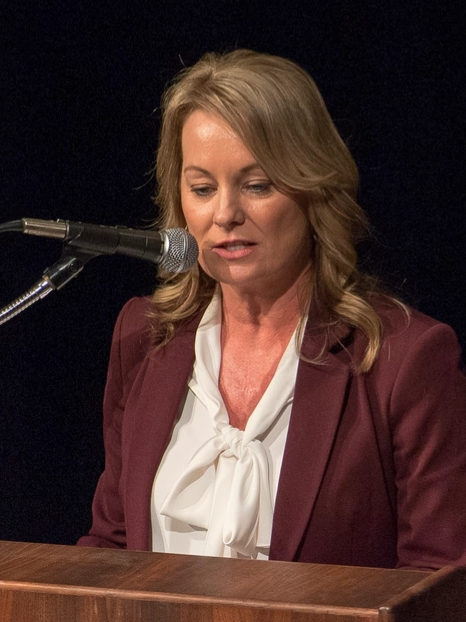

Idaho Superintendent of Public Instruction
- In office December 1, 2014 – January 2, 2023
- Governor: Butch Otter; Brad Little
- Preceded by: Tom Luna
- Succeeded by: Debbie Critchfield

Personal details
- Party: Republican
- Education: West Liberty University (BA); University of Idaho (MEd)
- Website: Campaign website

Sherri Ybarra is an American politician and educator who served as superintendent of public instruction of Idaho from 2014 to 2023. She was first elected to the position in 2014. Ybarra lost renomination in 2022, placing third in the Republican primary.

== Early life and education ==
Ybarra earned a Bachelor of Arts degree in elementary education from West Liberty University and Master of Arts in educational leadership from the University of Idaho.

== Career ==
Ybarra worked as a teacher and a high school principal in Mountain Home, Idaho area before becoming superintendent. A supporter of Donald Trump, Ybarra criticized the Trump administration’s 2017 proposal that would have reduced the United States Department of Education's budget by 13.5 percent.

== Elections ==
In the 2014, Ybarra defeated John R. Eynon, Andrew Grover, and Randy Jensen, earning 28.7% of the vote in the Republican primary. Ybarra defeated former chief deputy superintendent of public instruction Jana Jones, earning 50.6% of the vote, in the general election.

On December 16, 2015 she announced that she intended to seek a second term. On October 11, 2017 she launched her official reelection campaign. She defeated Jeff Dillon, superintendent of the Wilder School District in the Republican primary with 58.9% of the vote.

In 2018, Ybarra narrowly defeated Cindy Wilson, former Capital High School teacher, in the general election with 51.4% of the vote.

In 2022, Ybarra faced former state legislator Branden Durst as well as former State Board of Education member and Cassia County School Board member Debbie Critchfield in the Republican primary. Ybarra placed last, earning approximately 27% of the vote, with Critchfield emerging the victor.

== Personal life ==
Ybarra is married and has one child. Ybarra's husband is of Basque descent.

Political offices
Preceded by Tom Luna	Idaho Superintendent of Public Instruction; 2014–2023	Succeeded by Debbie Critchfield
