= Tom Luna =

American politician

Chair of the Idaho Republican Party
- In office June 27, 2020 – July 16, 2022
- Preceded by: Raúl Labrador
- Succeeded by: Dorothy Moon

Idaho Superintendent of Public Instruction
- In office January 1, 2007 – January 5, 2015
- Governor: Butch Otter
- Preceded by: Marilyn Howard
- Succeeded by: Sherri Ybarra

Personal details
- Born: 1958 (age 67–68) Santa Ana, California, U.S.
- Party: Republican
- Spouse: Cindy
- Children: 6, including Camille
- Education: Thomas Edison State University (BA)

Thomas Luna (born 1958) is an American politician who served as Idaho superintendent of public instruction from 2006 to 2014. He is a member of the Republican Party.

Luna was the chair of Idaho Republican Party from June 2020 to July 2022, when he lost re-election to State Representative Dorothy Moon.

== Early life and education ==
Luna was born in Santa Ana, California. He moved to Idaho to attend Ricks College (now Brigham Young University, Idaho) in 1981 and later attended Boise State University, but did not graduate from either.

Luna was initially prevented from serving as Idaho superintendent of public instruction because he lacked a college degree. To satisfy the requirement, Luna earned a Bachelor of Arts degree in Liberal Arts from Thomas Edison State College, a majority-online university based in Trenton, New Jersey.

== Career ==
=== Business ===
Luna is the former owner of Scales Unlimited, an industrial truck scale service company which he started in 1982 and sold in 2010. He was later appointed to be President of The International Society of Weights and Measurement (ISWM) and as a voting member of National Type Evaluation Program (NTEP).

=== Education ===
Luna served on the Nampa School Board for seven years, three of those as chairman. As a member of the Nampa School Board, Luna supported school vouchers and tax credits for private schools as a means to increase competition in education.

From 2003 to 2005 Luna worked for the United States Department of Education as an adviser to then-Secretary of Education, Rod Paige. He served as executive director for the White House Initiative of Tribal Colleges and Universities and as the director of the US Rural Education Task Force.

Running for the superintendent of public instruction in Idaho in 2006, Luna focused on promoting charter schools. Columnist William McGurn stated that he found Luna's business experience and lack of education degree, "refreshing".

In 2006, Luna was elected as Idaho superintendent of public instruction. He was re-elected to a second term in 2010. He was also appointed commissioner of Idaho Achievement Standards Committee and chairman of the Idaho Assessment and Accountability Committee.

The centerpiece of education reforms spearheaded by Luna following his 2006 election as superintendent is a package of legislation known as Students Come First. Among the reforms in the Students Come First package, passed by the Idaho Legislature in 2011, are new limits to the collective bargaining rights of Idaho teachers, an increased annual minimum pay for new teachers by $345, a performance-based merit pay system for teachers, an increased classroom size in grades 4 through 12, a performance-based merit pay system for teachers, the phasing out of tenure and implementation of rolling contracts for teachers and administrators, mandatory online course credit as a high school graduation requirement, and providing laptop computers for all high school teachers and students.

While serving as Idaho superintendent, Luna was Named president-elect of Chief State School Officers (2010) and was appointed to the National Assessment Governing Board (NAGB) to help set policy for the National Assessment of Educational Progress (NAEP).

=== Later career ===
Luna expressed interest in running for Idaho's 1st congressional district in 2017. On June 7, 2017, he announced that he would not seek the office or any other for 2018 Idaho elections. Part of his statement read, "At this time, I want to continue to focus on my passion for education versus serving in Congress." Luna also publicly supported Tommy Ahlquist, who ran against Lieutenant Governor Brad Little in the Republican primary for governor, and donated $2,500 to his campaign.

Luna is the Senior Vice President and Chief Government Relations Officer of Project Lead The Way.

=== Idaho Republican Party ===
Luna served the Idaho Republican Party as the financial chair of the executive committee.

Luna ran for chairman of the Idaho Republican Party in the summer of 2019 to fill the vacancy left by the February 2019 resignation of Jonathan Parker. Luna lost to Raul Labrador by a margin of just two votes, 111–109.

In 2020, Luna was again a candidate for chairman of the Idaho Republican Party after Raul Labrador announced that he would not seek re-election and would instead return to his law career. Luna defeated Mark Fuller, the chair of the Bonneville County Republican Central Committee in a 274–262 vote in June 2020.

Luna had Tyler Kelly as Executive Director.

Luna was defeated for reelection in July 2022 by State Representative Dorothy Moon, who most recently was the runner up in the May 2022 Primary for Secretary of State.

Luna (while Chair), along with Ada County Republicans Chair Victor Miller, hosted a weekly radio show called Red Wave Radio since January 2021.

Luna ran for (and lost) Idaho Republican Party National Committeeman at the 2024 Summer Convention against incumbent Bryan Smith only getting 200 votes compared to Bryan Smith's 390 votes.

== Personal life ==
Luna and his wife Cindy have six children and twenty grandchildren. Luna is a member of the LDS Church.

Political offices
Preceded by Marilyn Howard	Idaho Superintendent of Public Instruction; 2006–2014	Succeeded by Sherri Ybarra
Party political offices
Preceded by Raúl Labrador	Chair of the Idaho Republican Party; 2020–2022	Succeeded by Dorothy Moon
