= Marilyn Howard =

American politician (1939–2020)

23rd Idaho Superintendent of Public Instruction
- In office January 4, 1999 – January 1, 2007
- Preceded by: Anne C. Fox
- Succeeded by: Tom Luna

Personal details
- Born: April 18, 1939 Mackay, Idaho, U.S.
- Died: July 13, 2020 (aged 81) Eagle, Idaho, U.S.
- Party: Democratic
- Children: 2
- Education: University of Idaho (BA, MA); Brigham Young University (EdD)

Marilyn Lenore Howard (April 18, 1939 – July 13, 2020) was an American politician from Idaho who served as the 23rd Idaho Superintendent of Public Instruction from 1999 to 2007. She is the last Democrat to hold or be elected to statewide office in Idaho.

== Early life ==
Marilyn Lenore Howard was born on April 18, 1939, in Mackay, Idaho. In 1960, Howard graduated with a bachelor's degree in education from the University of Idaho and later with a master's degree in 1966. In 1986, she graduated with a doctorate in education from Brigham Young University. She completed postgraduate work at Idaho State University.

== Career ==
=== Education ===
In 1960, Howard became a history and language arts teacher in Lewiston, Idaho. In 1988, she became the principal of the West Park Elementary School in Moscow, Idaho. In 1992, she became the supervisor of the Moscow school district's developmental preschool.

=== Superintendent of Public Instruction ===
In 1997, Howard announced that she would seek the Democratic nomination for Idaho Superintendent of Public Instruction and defeated Wally Hedrick in the Democratic primary. In the general election she defeated incumbent Republican Superintendent Anne C. Fox. On January 29, 2002, she announced that she would seek reelection and won in the general election after defeating Republican nominee Tom Luna.

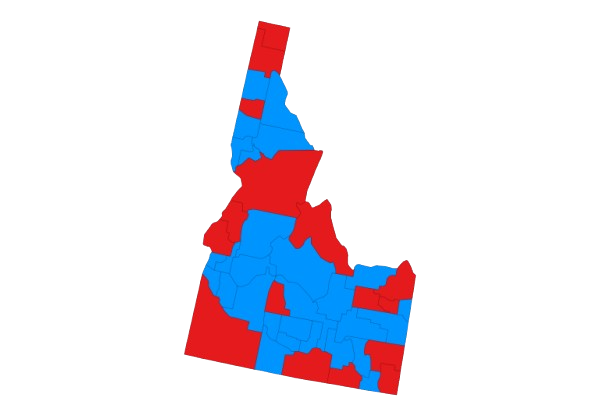
1998 State Superintendent Election, which is when she was elected.

In 2000, Howard was listed as the 26th most influential Idahoan. In 2002, she was listed as the 12th most influential Idahoan. During her tenure she and Governor Dirk Kempthorne attempted to create a position in the state Department of Education to oversee the education of Native American students, but the Idaho Legislature voted against it. However, the position would be later created by Tom Luna in 2007. In December 2006, she was criticized for distributing $120,098 in merit bonuses to 135 of her employees.

On October 25, 2005, Howard announced that she would not seek reelection. When she left office in 2007 she was the last member of the Democratic Party to hold statewide office in Idaho.

== Later life ==
In 2006, Howard underwent surgery for breast cancer. On July 13, 2020, Howard died in Eagle, Idaho, at age 81.

== Electoral history ==
1998 Idaho Superintendent of Public Instruction election
Primary election
Party	Candidate	Votes	%
Democratic	Marilyn Howard	14,150	50.67%
Democratic	Wally Hedrick	13,778	49.33%
Total votes		27,928	100.00%
General election
Democratic	Marilyn Howard	202,978	54.13%
Republican	Anne C. Fox (incumbent)	171,976	45.87%
Total votes		374,954	100.00%

2002 Idaho Superintendent of Public Instruction election
Primary election
Party	Candidate	Votes	%
Democratic	Marilyn Howard (incumbent)	36,813	100.00%
Total votes		36,813	100.00%
General election
Democratic	Marilyn Howard (incumbent)	211,566	52.17%
Republican	Tom Luna	184,018	45.37%
Libertarian	Robbi L. Kier	9,984	2.46%
Total votes		405,568	100.00%
