= Melinda Smyser =

American politician from Idaho

Member of the Idaho Senate from the 11th district
- In office January 16, 2009 – December 1, 2012
- Preceded by: Brad Little
- Succeeded by: Patti Anne Lodge

Personal details
- Born: October 29, 1958 (age 67) Caldwell, Idaho, U.S.
- Party: Republican
- Education: University of Idaho (BA); College of Idaho (MEd)

Melinda S. Smyser (born October 29, 1958) is an American politician who served as a member of the Idaho Senate from 2009 to 2012, representing District 11. Smyser previously served as Director of the Idaho Department of Labor and currently serves as the director of the Idaho Office of Drug Policy.

== Early life and education ==
Smyser was born in Caldwell, Idaho and raised in Middleton, where she graduated from Middleton High School.

Smyser received a Bachelor of Science with a double major in C/T/Design and Education and Extension from the University of Idaho. She also received a master's degree in Education and Counseling from the College of Idaho.

== Career ==
Smyser began her career a teacher in the Wilder School District. She worked as a counselor at the Parma School District from 1984 to 1989, and at Caldwell Alternative High School Counselor from 1989 to 1997. She served as the Public Relations coordinator for the Caldwell School District from 1998 to 2000.

Smyser was an Idaho elector for the 2008 United States presidential election for John McCain. She also served as the Canyon County Republican Party Chair.

In 2014, she managed Jim Risch's Senate re-election campaign. She worked in his Senate office as Southwest Regional Director from 2012 to 2017.

She was one of Idaho's four GOP presidential electors in the 2016 United States presidential election until December 15, 2016, when she was informed that, as a federal employee, she is constitutionally barred from serving as an elector. (She at the time worked for Senator Jim Risch.) She was replaced by her husband C. A. "Skip" Smyser.

=== Senate ===
In 2009, Smyser was appointed to represent Idaho's 11th legislative district, which encompasses both Gem and Canyon counties, after Brad Little was appointed lieutenant governor.

In 2010 she was elected with 10,386 votes (73.3%) against Democrat Shannon L. Forrester and independent Kirsten Faith Richardson.

On March 5, 2012, Smyser announced that she would not be seeking re-election; redistricting would have forced a primary contest with fellow Republican Senator Patti Anne Lodge in the newly redrawn District 11. She said: "I have every intention to stay involved and I will announce my future plans soon."

=== Later career ===
Smyser was seen as a potential candidate in the 2018 Idaho election for lieutenant governor.

On September 29, 2017, Governor Butch Otter announced that Smyser would replace Ken Emmunds as Director of the Idaho Department of Labor. In 2019, she was appointed by Governor Brad Little to serve as Director of the Idaho Office of Drug Policy.

Since June 2020 Smyser has served as a Canyon County Republican Party committeewoman.

Although she was disqualified as a presidential elector in 2016, Smyser was an elector in 2020, voting for Donald Trump.

== Personal life ==
Smyser is married to C. A. "Skip" Smyser, an attorney and businessman who serves as the founder and CEO of Lobby Idaho, LLC, a lobbying firm based in Boise. They have four children.
