= Lawrence Wasden =

American politician

32nd Attorney General of Idaho
- In office January 6, 2003 – January 2, 2023
- Governor: Dirk Kempthorne; Jim Risch; Butch Otter; Brad Little
- Preceded by: Al Lance
- Succeeded by: Raúl Labrador

Personal details
- Born: Lawrence Garth Wasden; November 3, 1957 (age 68)
- Party: Republican
- Spouse: Tracey Wasden
- Children: 4
- Education: Brigham Young University (BA); University of Idaho (JD)

Lawrence Garth Wasden (born November 3, 1957) is an American attorney and politician who served as the Idaho Attorney General from 2003 to 2023. First elected in 2002, he was the longest-serving attorney general in Idaho history. Wasden was re-elected four more times before being defeated in the 2022 Republican primary by Raúl Labrador.

== Education ==
Wasden earned a Bachelor of Arts degree from Brigham Young University in 1982 and a Juris Doctor from the University of Idaho College of Law in 1985.

== Career ==
Wasden was admitted to the Idaho State Bar in 1985. He served as deputy prosecuting attorney in Canyon County, Idaho and prosecuting attorney in Owyhee County, Idaho. Wasden later served as chief of staff and deputy chief of staff to the Idaho attorney general and as a deputy attorney general for the Idaho State Tax Commission.

=== Attorney general of Idaho ===
In July 2017, Texas Attorney General Ken Paxton led a group of Republican Attorneys General from nine other states, including Wasden, plus Idaho Governor Butch Otter, in threatening the Donald Trump administration that they would litigate if the president did not terminate the Deferred Action for Childhood Arrivals policy that had been implemented by President Barack Obama. Tennessee Attorney General Herbert Slatery subsequently reversed his position and withdrew his participation from the proposed suit. Slatery went further to urge passage of the DREAM Act. The other attorneys general who joined in making the threats against Trump included Steve Marshall of Alabama, Leslie Rutledge of Arkansas, Derek Schmidt of Kansas, Jeff Landry of Louisiana, Doug Peterson of Nebraska, Alan Wilson of South Carolina, and Patrick Morrisey of West Virginia.

In 2019, Wasden and 16 other A.G. declined to join a letter in support of the Secure and Fair Enforcement (SAFE) Banking Act (H.R. 1595), sponsored by U.S. Rep. Ed Perlmutter (D-Colo.), which would permit marijuana-related businesses in states and territories to use the banking system.

In 2020, Wasden declined to join the Texas v. Pennsylvania, saying "Idaho is a sovereign state and should be free to govern itself without interference from any other state. Likewise, Idaho should respect the sovereignty of its sister states."

=== 2022 primary election ===
Results by county Labrador: 40–50%; 50–60%; 60–70%; 70–80%; Wasden: 40–50%; 50–60%

In 2022, Wasden faced heavy opposition from the right. Attorney Arthur Macomber and former Congressman Raúl Labrador both filed to run against Wasden. Wasden lost the May 17 primary to Labrador by over thirteen points.

== Personal ==
Wasden is married and has four children.

== Electoral history ==
Idaho Attorney General Republican Primary Election, 2002
Party	Candidate	Votes	%
Republican	Lawrence Wasden	39,917	32.20
Republican	Michael Bogert	37,862	30.50
Republican	Todd Lakey	29,154	23.50
Republican	Myron Dan Gabbert	17,071	13.80

Idaho Attorney General Election, 2002
Party	Candidate	Votes	%
Republican	Lawrence Wasden	231,851	58.10
Democratic	R. Keith Roark	167,353	41.90

Idaho Attorney General Republican Primary Election, 2006
Party	Candidate	Votes	%
Republican	Lawrence Wasden (inc.)	89,327	73.70
Republican	Myron Dan Gabbert	31,795	26.30

Idaho Attorney General Election, 2006
Party	Candidate	Votes	%
Republican	Lawrence Wasden (inc.)	267,700	61.75
Democratic	Robert "Bob" Wallace	165,857	38.25

Idaho Attorney General Election, 2010
Party	Candidate	Votes	%
Republican	Lawrence Wasden (inc.)	367,737	100.00

Idaho Attorney General Republican Primary Election, 2014
Party	Candidate	Votes	%
Republican	Lawrence Wasden (inc.)	83,850	59.10
Republican	"Chris" Troupis	58,025	40.90

Idaho Attorney General Election, 2014
Party	Candidate	Votes	%
Republican	Lawrence Wasden (inc.)	289,762	68.00
Democratic	Bruce Bistline	136,081	32.00

Idaho Attorney General Republican Primary Election, 2018
Party	Candidate	Votes	%
Republican	Lawrence Wasden (inc.)	157,064	100.00

Idaho Attorney General Election, 2018
Party	Candidate	Votes	%
Republican	Lawrence Wasden (inc.)	384,791	65.40
Democratic	Bruce Bistline	203,283	34.60

Idaho Attorney General Republican Primary Election, 2022
Party	Candidate	Votes	%
Republican	Raúl Labrador	140,585	51.60
Republican	Lawrence Wasden	103,393	37.90
Republican	Arthur B. Macomber	28,700	10.50

Legal offices
Preceded by Al Lance	Attorney General of Idaho; 2003–2023	Succeeded by Raúl Labrador
