= Raúl Labrador =

American politician (born 1967)

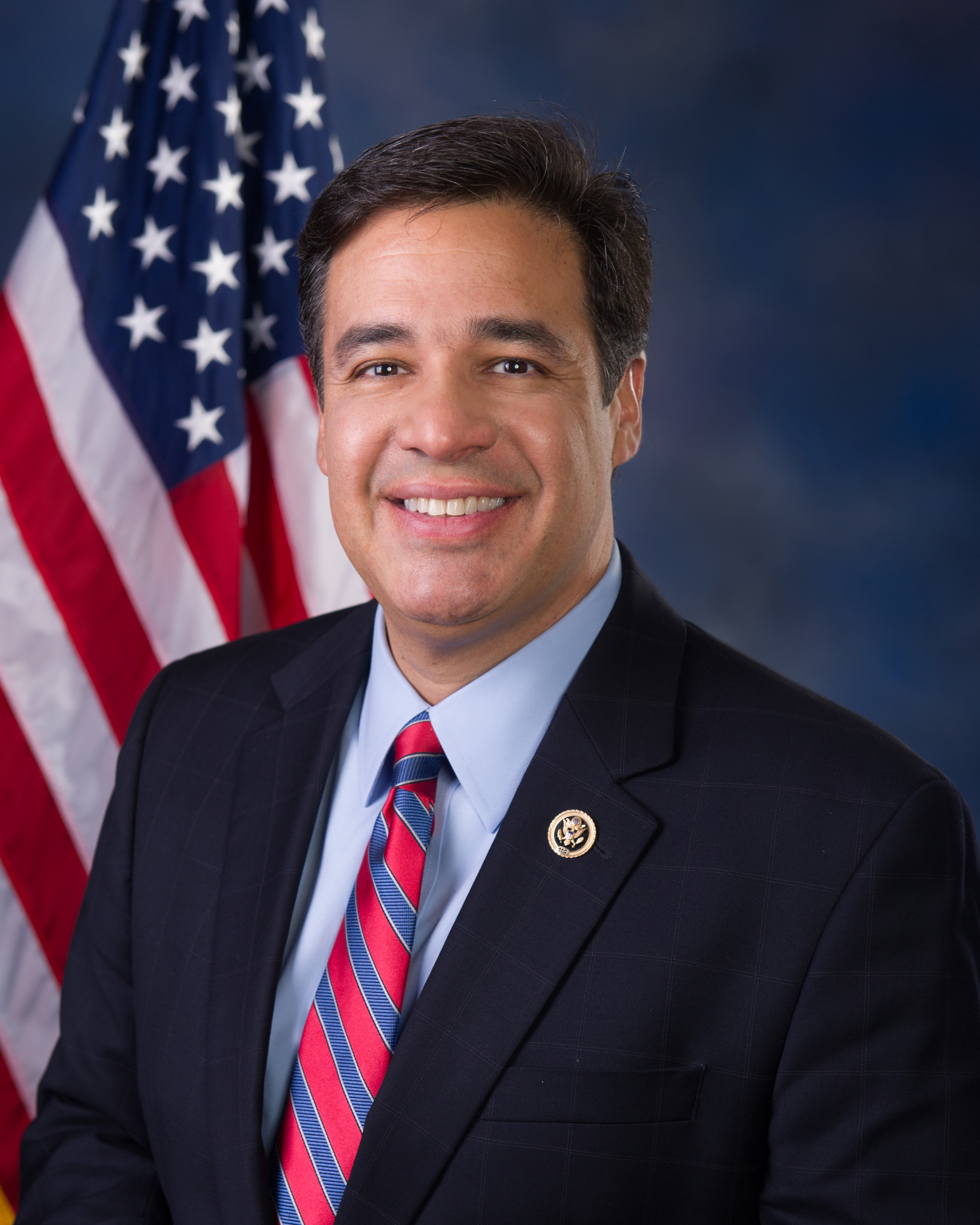
- Official portrait, 2016

33rd Attorney General of Idaho
- Incumbent
- Assumed office January 2, 2023
- Governor: Brad Little
- Preceded by: Lawrence Wasden

Chair of the Idaho Republican Party
- In office June 29, 2019 – June 27, 2020
- Preceded by: Jennifer Locke (acting)
- Succeeded by: Tom Luna

Member of the U.S. House of Representatives from Idaho's 1st district
- In office January 3, 2011 – January 3, 2019
- Preceded by: Walt Minnick
- Succeeded by: Russ Fulcher

Member of the Idaho House of Representatives from the 14th district Seat B
- In office December 1, 2006 – November 30, 2010
- Preceded by: Stan Bastian
- Succeeded by: Reed DeMordaunt

Personal details
- Born: Raúl Rafael Labrador; December 8, 1967 (age 58) Carolina, Puerto Rico
- Party: Republican
- Spouse: Rebecca Johnson (m. 1991)
- Children: 5
- Education: Brigham Young University (BA); University of Washington (JD)
- Labrador's voice Labrador on the immigration policy of the Barack Obama administration. Recorded November 30, 2012

Raúl Rafael Labrador (born December 8, 1967) is an American lawyer and politician who has served as the 33rd attorney general of Idaho since 2023. Previously, he was the U.S. representative for Idaho's 1st congressional district from 2011 to 2019, and a member of the Idaho House of Representatives from 2006 to 2010. He is a member of the Republican Party, chairing the Idaho Republican Party from 2019 to 2020.

Labrador was first elected to Congress in 2010, winning the Republican primary with the support of Tea Party activists and defeating Democratic incumbent Walt Minnick in the general election. In 2014, he mounted an unsuccessful challenge to Kevin McCarthy for the position of House Majority Leader, running as a more conservative alternative. In 2015, Labrador became one of the nine inaugural members of the House Freedom Caucus.

Labrador ran for governor of Idaho in 2018, finishing second in the Republican primary to Lieutenant Governor Brad Little. He later chaired the Idaho Republican Party from 2019 to 2020. In 2022, he was elected attorney general after defeating longtime incumbent Lawrence Wasden in the Republican primary.

== Early life and education ==
Born on December 8, 1967, in Carolina, Puerto Rico, Labrador relocated to Las Vegas, Nevada, as a child and graduated from Las Vegas High School in 1985. He was raised by a single mother who struggled financially.

He attended Brigham Young University in Provo, Utah, and spent two years as a missionary for the Church of Jesus Christ of Latter-day Saints in Santiago Chile from 1987 to 1989. Labrador returned to BYU and received a Bachelor of Arts degree in Spanish in 1992 with an emphasis in Latin American literature. He was admitted to the University of Washington School of Law in Seattle and received his Juris Doctor in 1995.

== Early career ==
Married in 1991, Labrador relocated to his wife's home state of Idaho and practiced law and immigration law in private practice from 1995 until his election to the state legislature in 2006.

=== Idaho House of Representatives ===
==== 2006 ====
Labrador ran for and won the Republican nomination for Idaho House Seat B against two other challengers. He won the general election with 65.55% against Daniel S. Weston.

==== 2008 ====
He was unopposed in the May 2008 Republican primary. Labrador defeated Glida Bothwell in the general election, winning 69.1% of the vote.

==== Committee assignments ====
Labrador served on the Environment, Energy, and Technology Committee in 2007, Judiciary, Rules, and Administration Committee from 2007 to 2010, the State Affairs Committee from 2007 to 2010, and the Transportation and Defense Committee from 2009 to 2010.

== U.S. House of Representatives ==
=== Elections ===
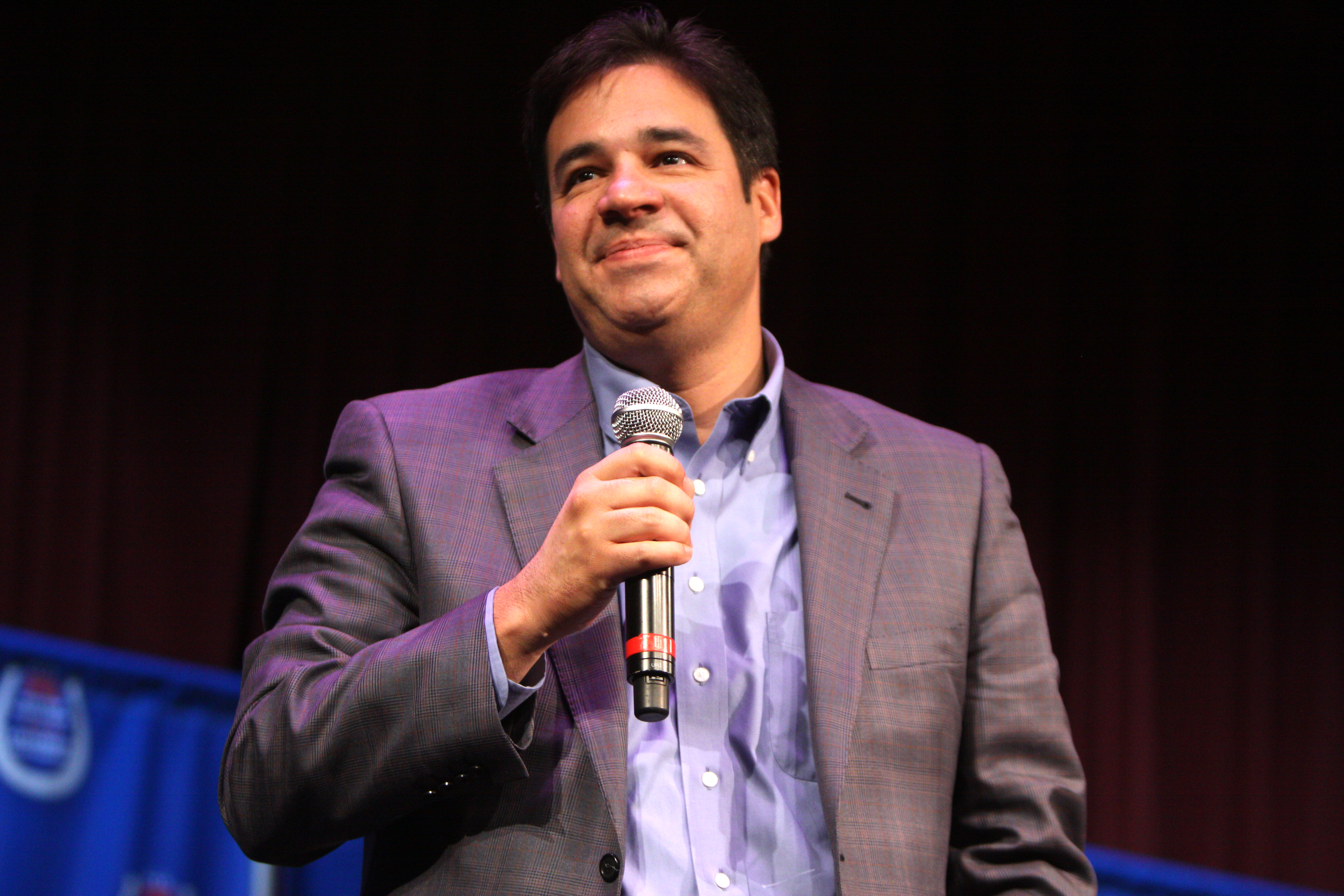
Labrador in Las Vegas, 2011

==== 2010 ====
In 2010, Labrador defeated Vaughn Ward in the Republican primary 48%–39% on May 10, in what was widely considered a major upset. Labrador credited his victory in the Republican primary to support from activists affiliated with the Tea Party movement. In the general election, Labrador defeated first-term Democratic incumbent Walt Minnick 51% to 41%.

==== 2012 ====
Labrador supported Mitt Romney for president.

==== 2014 ====
On August 14, 2013, Labrador decided not to challenge incumbent Idaho Governor Butch Otter in the Republican primary, instead running for reelection to Congress for a third term.

On August 19, 2013, Democratic State Representative Shirley Ringo decided to challenge Labrador instead of running for an eighth term in the Idaho state legislature.

Labrador announced on June 13 that he would challenge Majority Whip Kevin McCarthy for the leadership position. Labrador sought to challenge McCarthy from the right. In a vote held June 19, 2014, the House selected McCarthy. In January 2015, he was one of nine Republicans who launched the House Freedom Caucus.

Labrador won both the Republican primary (78.6%) and the general election (65%).

==== 2016 ====
A supporter of Donald Trump in the 2016 election, Labrador won the Republican primary (81%) in May, and the general election (68.2%) in November. Labrador had initially supported Ted Cruz's 2016 presidential campaign.

=== Tenure ===
Town halls

Labrador was one of the few Republicans to host a town hall after the election of Donald Trump and the only member of the state's congressional delegation to host one.

=== Committee assignments ===
- Committee on Natural Resources
  - Federal Lands
  - Oversight and Investigations- Chair
- Committee on the Judiciary
  - Subcommittee on Immigration and Border Security- Vice Chair
  - Crime, Terrorism, Homeland Security, and Investigations

=== Caucus memberships ===
- Liberty Caucus
- Freedom Caucus
- Congressional Western Caucus

== Political positions ==
=== Domestic issues ===
==== Health care ====
On April 20, 2017, Labrador said he does not believe healthcare is a human right. Labrador supports the full repeal of the Affordable Care Act because he believes it will raise costs and eliminate jobs.

Labrador supports requiring those illegally residing in the United States to be responsible for their own healthcare costs.

He voted for the American Health Care Act of 2017, which passed the House May 4, 2017. One of the few Republican lawmakers who hosted a town hall after this vote, Labrador received national attention for stating during the meeting at Lewis-Clark State College that "Nobody dies because they don't have access to healthcare." The statement caused a huge outcry from the audience present and on social media for several days.

=== Economic issues ===
==== Elections ====
Labrador has stated that he supports the repeal of the 17th Amendment to the U.S. Constitution which provides for the direct election of US senators by the voters in each state. Before the amendment was ratified in 1913, senators were selected by the legislatures of their respective states. With regard to this position, Labrador has stated "I have a consistent philosophy about government and the importance of states' rights."

==== Tax reform ====
Labrador is in favor of tax reform, specifically reform that rids of loopholes, lowers "overall rates," and reduces government spending so the national debt does not increase.

Labrador voted in favor of the Tax Cuts and Jobs Act of 2017. He says the bill will "allow hard-working Idahoans to keep more of their money," including helping them "meet their expenses and make crucial investments."

=== International issues ===
==== Energy and oil ====
Labrador is seen by many in eastern Idaho, which is not in his congressional district, as an opponent of the Idaho National Laboratory.

==== Immigration ====
On the July 6, 2014, episode of Meet the Press, Labrador stated that the Obama administration needed to "immediately deport" young illegal immigrants. The comment came as part of a discussion about the estimated 52,000 unaccompanied minors from Central America who had tried to cross the border since October 2013.

Labrador was a member of the "Gang of Eight," a bipartisan group of House members working on immigration reform legislation, but on June 5, 2013, he left the negotiations because he wanted language in the bill requiring that illegal immigrants be responsible for their own health care costs. Labrador said he would use his position on the House Judiciary Committee to pass immigration reform legislation.

=== Social issues ===
==== Abortion ====
Labrador opposes late termination of pregnancy and believes "life begins at conception". Labrador voted in favor of the Pain-Capable Unborn Child Protection Act in 2017.

==== Family Rights ====
Idaho is one of the states that has a faith-healing exemption. In a debate, Labrador said he would not change it.

==== LGBT issues ====
In June 2015, Labrador introduced HR 2802, titled the "First Amendment Defense Act" (FADA) which was said to protect those who oppose same-sex marriage based on their religious beliefs from action by the federal government. Critics, such as Ian Thompson of the American Civil Liberties Union claimed that the bill would "open the door to unprecedented taxpayer-funded discrimination against LGBT people, single mothers, and unmarried couples."

== Elections ==
District 14 House Seat B - Part of Ada County
Year	Candidate	Votes	Pct	Candidate	Votes	Pct	Candidate	Votes	Pct
2006 primary	Raúl Labrador	2,448	46.4%	John Tomkinson	1,535	29.1%	Jim Borton	1,292	24.5%
2006 general	Raúl Labrador	13,208	65.5%	Daniel Weston	6,943	34.5%			
2008 primary	Raúl Labrador (incumbent)	4,945	100%						
2008 general	Raúl Labrador (incumbent)	22,093	69.1%	Glida Bothwell	9,869	30.9%			

== 2018 gubernatorial campaign ==
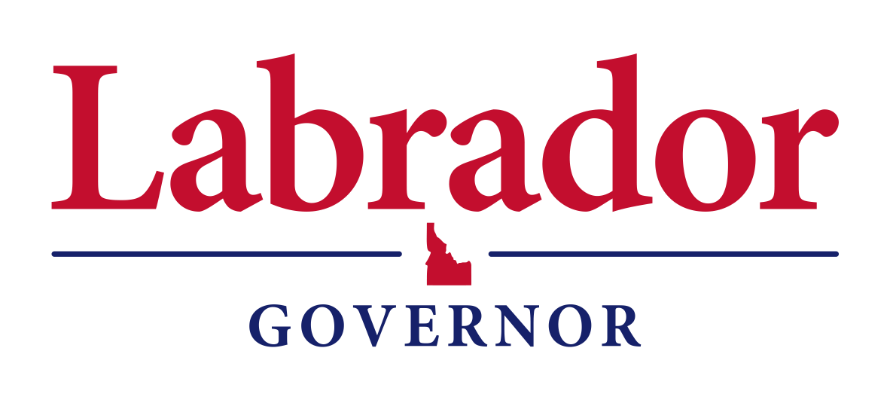
Labrador's gubernatorial campaign logo

On May 9, 2017, Labrador filed to run in the 2018 Idaho gubernatorial race, and embarked on a kick-off tour several weeks later with stops in Boise, Post Falls, and Idaho Falls. He was not able to run for his current congressional seat and governor at the same time; leaving CD-1 an open seat in 2018.

In November 2017, Senator Ted Cruz of Texas endorsed Labrador.

Labrador placed second in the Republican gubernatorial primary to Lieutenant Governor Brad Little, winning 32.6% of the vote.

== Chair of the Idaho Republican Party (2019–2020) ==
In June 2019, Labrador announced that he would run for chairman of the Idaho Republican Party at its next State Central Committee meeting, having already received the backing and support of most IDGOP officers.

On June 29, 2019, Labrador won Idaho Republican Party Chair by two votes, defeating former Superintendent of Education Tom Luna. A year later in June 2020, Labrador resigned from his position as party chair and joined a local law firm; he was succeeded by Luna. He had Frank Terraferma and Tyler Kelly as Executive Director.

== Idaho Attorney General ==
Results by county

=== 2022 election ===
Labrador filed as a candidate in the 2022 Idaho attorney general election on November 17, 2021. He challenged 20-year incumbent Lawrence Wasden for the Republican nomination; in the primary on May 17, Labrador won with 51.6% of the vote.

In the general election on November 8, he received 62.6% of the vote to easily defeat Democrat Tom Arkoosh.

=== Tenure ===
Labrador was sworn in as Idaho's attorney general on January 2, 2023. Four days later, he filed a motion to dismiss charges against Sara Walton Brady, a Meridian woman who was arrested in 2020 for trespassing during the COVID-19 lockdown.

== Personal life ==
Labrador lives in Eagle with his wife Rebecca and their five children; he is a member of the Church of Jesus Christ of Latter-day Saints.

== See also ==
- List of Hispanic and Latino Americans in the United States Congress

U.S. House of Representatives
Preceded by Walt Minnick	Member of the U.S. House of Representatives from Idaho's 1st congressional district 2011–2019	Succeeded by Russ Fulcher
Party political offices
Preceded by Jennifer Locke; Acting	Chair of the Idaho Republican Party; 2019–2020	Succeeded by Tom Luna
Preceded by Lawrence Wasden	Republican nominee for Attorney General of Idaho; 2022, 2026	Most recent
Legal offices
Preceded by Lawrence Wasden	Attorney General of Idaho; 2023–present	Incumbent
U.S. order of precedence (ceremonial)
Preceded by Denny Heck as Former U.S. Representative	Order of precedence of the United States as Former U.S. Representative	Succeeded by David Daniel Marriott as Former U.S. Representative
