= Idaho Public Television =

PBS member network in Idaho

- Type: Non-commercial educational broadcast television network
- Branding: Idaho Public Television PBS
- Country: United States
- First air date: September 6, 1965
- Availability: Statewide Idaho
- TV stations: see § Stations
- Broadcast area: Statewide Idaho
- Owner: State of Idaho
- Parent: State Board of Education
- Affiliation: PBS
- Former affiliations: KUID-TV: NET (1965–1970)
- Official website: www.idahoptv.org

Idaho Public Television (also known as IdahoPTV and Idaho Public TV) is a Public Broadcasting Service (PBS) member network serving the U.S. state of Idaho. Consisting of five television stations, it is operated and funded by the Idaho State Board of Education, an agency of the Idaho state government that holds the licenses to all PBS member stations in the state. The network is headquartered in Boise, with satellite studios at the University of Idaho in Moscow and Idaho State University in Pocatello.

Broadcast and online programs produced by Idaho Public Television include Outdoor Idaho, Idaho Reports, Idaho Experience, Dialogue, Idaho in Session, Science Trek and The 180 with Marcia Franklin.

== History ==
The network's first station, KUID-TV, signed on from the University of Idaho campus in September 1965. KBGL-TV signed on in July 1971 from Idaho State University in Pocatello, followed that December by KAID-TV in Boise, licensed to Boise State University. After a decade, KBGL changed its call letters to KISU-TV in 1981. The three stations shared many programs, but were largely operated independently at first. However, in 1981, two KUID-produced documentaries—one about logging practices, another about lead exposure—caused such an outcry that the state legislature yanked nearly all funding for public television. Citing budget restrictions in early 1981, the state legislature cut 90% of the state funding for public television, and the stations relied on federal funding and private donations.

A year later, the legislature ordered the merger of the three stations into a single network. The licenses for all three stations were transferred to the state board of education. Two other stations were added in 1992 at Coeur d'Alene and Twin Falls, the respective cities of North Idaho College and the College of Southern Idaho.

In 2001, Idaho PTV began broadcasting its HD channel, KAID HD, using the default PBS HD schedule. Once the digital switchover had occurred in July 2009 and after a two-year acclimation process, the main HD channel became the home of the regular IdahoPTV schedule in August 2011, and the second standard definition channel was converted from the regular IdahoPTV schedule into a "Plus" subchannel, featuring an alternate schedule of programming.

== Stations ==
Combined, the five stations and their extensive translator network reach almost all of Idaho, as well as parts of Washington, Montana, and Oregon. The north Idaho stations of Coeur d'Alene and Moscow are in the Pacific Time Zone, while the south Idaho stations of Boise, Twin Falls, and Pocatello are in the Mountain Time Zone.

Station	City of license (Note: Aside from their transmitters, KCDT and KIPT do not maintain any physical presence in their cities of license.)	Channels (RF / VC)	First air date	Call letters' meaning	ERP	HAAT	Facility ID	Transmitter coordinates	Public license information
KAID (Flagship station)	Boise	21 (UHF); 4	December 31, 1971	Ada County, Idaho (county where Boise is based)	725 kW	858 m (2,815 ft)	62442	43°45′20.8″N 116°5′57″W	Public file LMS
KCDT	Coeur d'Alene	18 (UHF); 26	September 22, 1992	"Coeur D'Alene Television"	54.7 kW; 50 kW (CP)	465 m (1,526 ft)	62424	47°43′53.6″N 116°43′50.6″W	Public file LMS
KIPT	Twin Falls	22 (UHF); 13	January 1992 (Note: The Broadcasting and Cable Yearbook says KIPT signed on January 18, while the Television and Cable Factbook says it signed on January 17.)	"Idaho Public Television"	77.98 kW	181.9 m (597 ft)	62427	42°43′45.9″N 114°24′56.5″W	Public file LMS
KISU-TV (Note: KISU-TV used the call sign KBGL-TV from its 1971 sign-on until December 7, 1981. (The ISU athletic teams are the Bengals.))	Pocatello	17 (UHF); 10	July 7, 1971	Idaho State University	172 kW	464.8 m (1,525 ft)	62430	43°30′3.6″N 112°39′43.9″W	Public file LMS
KUID-TV	Moscow	12 (VHF) (Note: KUID-TV was on analog channel 12 until its digital channel signed on; the analog signal was moved to channel 35, which had previously been assigned as KUID's digital allocation.); 12	September 6, 1965	University of Idaho	78 kW	339.7 m (1,115 ft)	62382	46°40′54″N 116°58′17″W	Public file LMS

== Digital television ==
=== Subchannels ===
The digital signals of IdahoPTV's stations are multiplexed:

Idaho Public Television multiplex
Subchannel	Res.	Short name	Programming
xx.1	1080i	IDPTVHD	PBS
xx.2	1080i	PLUS	IdahoPTV Plus
xx.3	480i	LEARN	Create / Idaho PTV Learn
xx.4	480i	WORLD	World Channel
xx.5	480i	KIDS	PBS Kids

=== Analog-to-digital conversion ===
IdahoPTV's stations ended regular programming on their analog signals on June 12, 2009, the official date on which full-power television stations in the United States transitioned from analog to digital broadcasts under federal mandate, with the exception of KAID, which was part of the Analog Nightlight Program and was shut off on June 15, 2009. The station's digital channel allocations post-transition are as follows:

- KAID ended regular programming on its analog signal on June 15, 2009, over VHF channel 4; the station's digital signal remained on its pre-transition UHF channel 21, using virtual channel 4. As part of the SAFER Act, KAID kept its analog signal on the air until June 15 to inform viewers of the digital television transition through a loop of public service announcements from the National Association of Broadcasters.
- KCDT shut down its analog signal, over UHF channel 26; the station's digital signal remained on its pre-transition UHF channel 45, using virtual channel 26.
- KIPT shut down its analog signal, over VHF channel 13; the station's digital signal remained on its pre-transition UHF channel 22, using virtual channel 13.
- KISU-TV shut down its analog signal, over VHF channel 10; the station's digital signal remained on its pre-transition UHF channel 17, using virtual channel 10.
- KUID-TV shut down its analog signal, over UHF channel 35; the station's digital signal broadcasts on its pre-transition VHF channel 12.

== Translators ==
- KAID (DTS) Boise Front (translates KAID)
- K24NO-D Bonners Ferry (translates KCDT)
- K14IC-D Burley (translates KIPT)
- K11PB-D Cambridge (translates KAID)
- K09LO-D Cascade (translates KAID)
- KAID (DRT) Cascade (translates KAID)
- K12LS-D Challis (translates KISU-TV)
- K11WR-D Council (translates KAID)
- K13QE-D Driggs (translates KISU-TV)
- KAID (DTS) Emmett (translates KAID)
- K26OW-D Garden Valley (translates KAID)
- K15GO-D Georgetown (translates KISU-TV)
- KAID (DRT) Glenns Ferry (translates KAID)
- K35MJ-D Grangeville (translates KUID-TV)
- K25OX-D Hagerman (translates KIPT)
- KAID (DTS) Harris Ranch (translates KAID)
- K25PO-D Holbrook (translates KISU-TV)
- KAID (DRT) Idaho City (translates KAID)
- K22NX-D Juliaetta (translates KUID-TV)
- K11KO-D Kamiah (translates KUID-TV)
- K25OP-D Kellogg (translates KUID-TV)
- K05GQ-D Kooskia (translates KUID-TV)
- K14MC-D Lava Hot Springs (translates KISU-TV)
- K14IJ-D Leadore (translates KISU-TV)
- K25NZ-D Lewiston (translates KUID-TV)
- K15HR-D Mackay (translates KISU-TV)
- K22NV-D Malad City (translates KISU-TV)
- K23DO-D Malta (translates KISU-TV)
- K11WT-D McCall (translates KAID)
- K25OR-D McCall (translates KAID)
- K20NT-D McDermitt, NV (translates KAID)
- K23BV-D Montpelier (translates KISU-TV)
- K27GM-D Preston (translates KISU-TV)
- K36PW-D Priest Lake (translates KCDT)
- K20MQ-D Rexburg (translates KISU-TV)
- K19CY-D Rockland (translates KISU-TV)
- K23HT-D St. Maries (translates KUID-TV)
- K29LY-D Salmon (translates KISU-TV)
- K30LS-D Sandpoint (translates KCDT)
- K31PT-D Soda Springs (translates KISU-TV)
- K13QH-D Swan Valley/Irwin (translates KISU-TV)
