= Brad Little =

Governor of Idaho since 2019

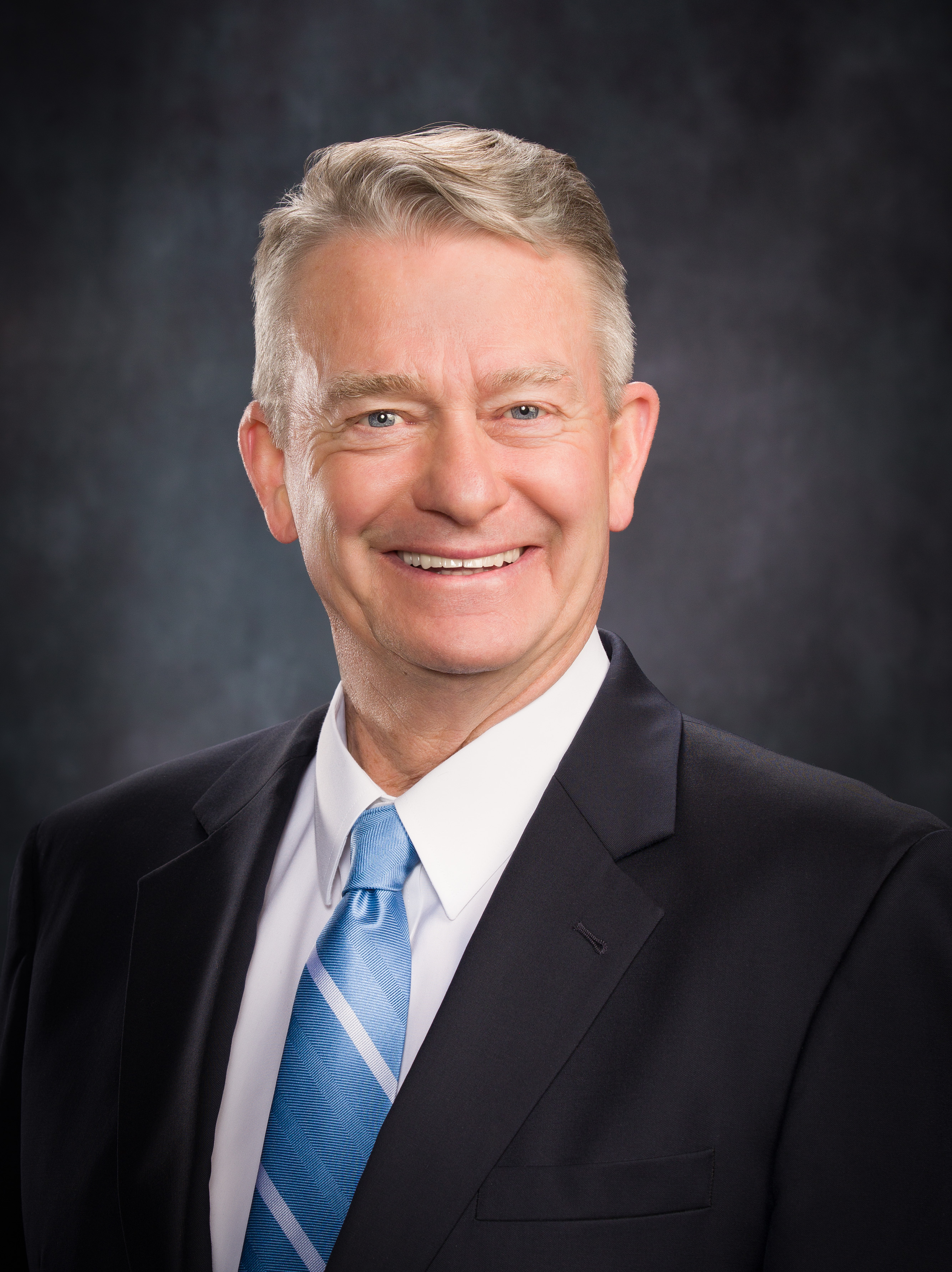
- Official portrait, 2019

33rd Governor of Idaho
- Incumbent
- Assumed office January 7, 2019
- Lieutenant: Janice McGeachin; Scott Bedke
- Preceded by: Butch Otter

42nd Lieutenant Governor of Idaho
- In office January 6, 2009 – January 7, 2019
- Governor: Butch Otter
- Preceded by: Jim Risch
- Succeeded by: Janice McGeachin

Member of the Idaho Senate
- In office May 24, 2001 – January 6, 2009
- Preceded by: Judy Danielson
- Succeeded by: Melinda Smyser
- Constituency: 8th district (2001–2003); 11th district (2003–2009)

Personal details
- Born: Bradley Jay Little; February 15, 1954 (age 72) Emmett, Idaho, U.S.
- Party: Republican
- Spouse: Teresa Soulen (m. 1978)
- Children: 2
- Education: University of Idaho (BS)
- Website: Office website Campaign website
- Little's voice Little on deregulation and telehealth Recorded July 16, 2020

Bradley Jay Little (born February 15, 1954) is an American politician serving since 2019 as the 33rd governor of Idaho. A member of the Republican Party, he served as the 42nd lieutenant governor of Idaho from 2009 to 2019 and as an Idaho state senator from 2001 to 2009.

Little is a graduate of the University of Idaho, having earned a Bachelor of Science degree in 1976. Little ran his family's ranching operation and served on various business and civic boards, including 20 years with the Idaho Association of Commerce and Industry, before being appointed Idaho state senator by Governor Dirk Kempthorne in 2001. In 2009, Governor Butch Otter appointed Little as lieutenant governor after Jim Risch resigned to become a United States senator.

Little was elected governor in 2018 after winning a crowded Republican primary with 37.3% of the vote. He won renomination with 52.8% of the vote, and was reelected in 2022, defeating Democratic nominee Stephen Heidt and independent candidate Ammon Bundy.

== Early life and education ==
Little was born and raised in Emmett, Idaho and graduated from Emmett High School in 1972. He attended the University of Idaho in Moscow, was a member of the Idaho Alpha chapter of Phi Delta Theta fraternity, and earned a B.S. in agribusiness in 1977.

== Career ==
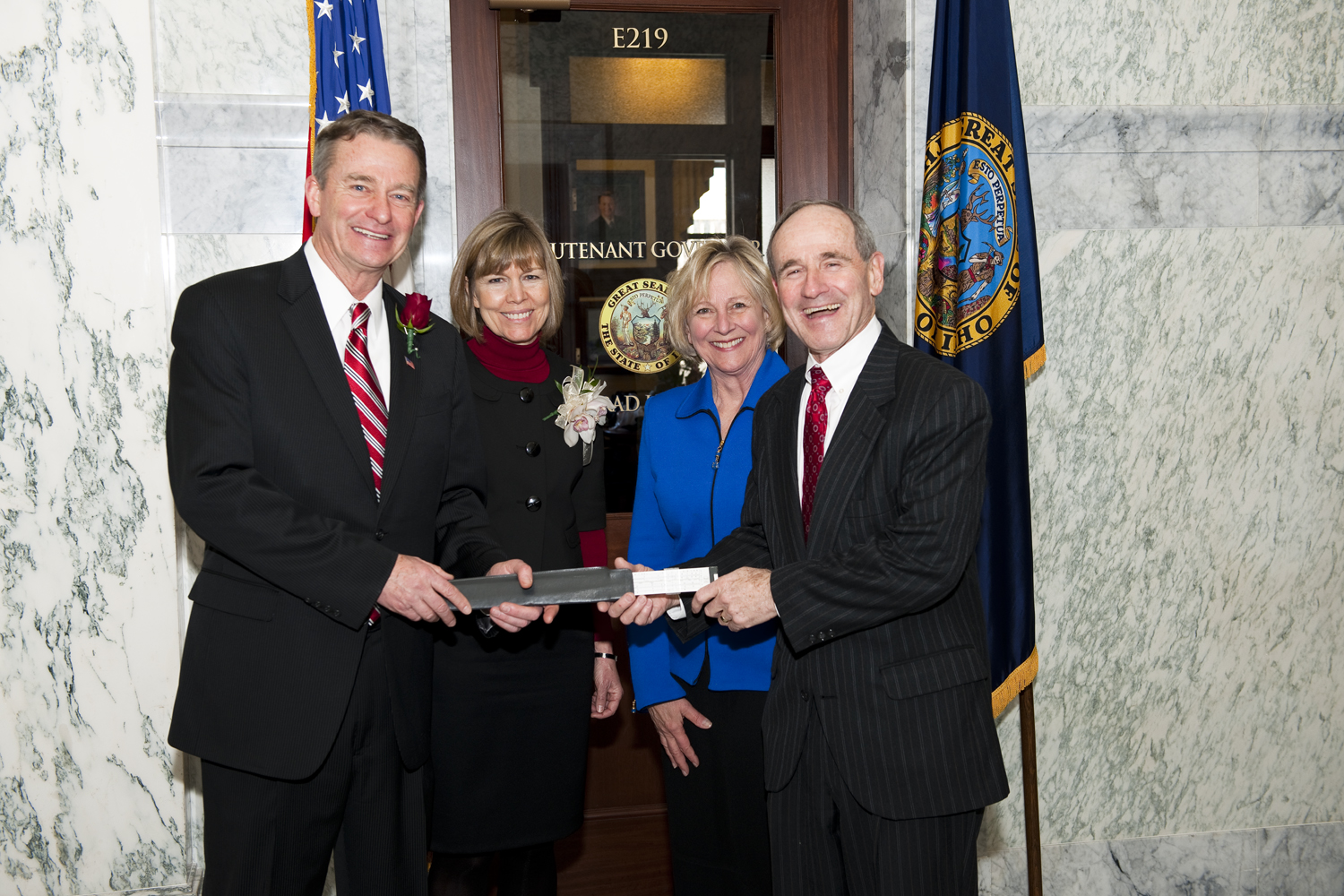
Little at his 2011 inauguration, with U.S. Senator Jim Risch and their wives

Little has had an extensive dual career tending to his family's ranching interests (his grandfather was the "Idaho Sheep King") and in public service. During the 1981 and 1985 legislative sessions, Little represented his father, David Little, in the Senate on a temporary appointment due to illness, during which time he served on the Finance and Resources Committees. Little also managed his family's ranching operation, Little Land and Livestock, for almost 30 years until his son, David, became manager in 2009 when Little was appointed lieutenant governor. He continues to work as the head of Little Enterprises, Inc. (a diversified farming and cattle operation), and is a member of the board of directors of Performance Design Inc., a small Boise-based manufacturing company.

Little has also been involved in a variety of private organizations and companies based in Idaho and the Mountain West. He is a former chairman of the Idaho Association of Commerce and Industry (IACI), "The Voice of Business in Idaho", and was a member of its board for 20 years (1981–2001). Little is also the former vice-chairman of the Idaho Community Foundation and the Emmett Public School Foundation, and the former director of the Idaho Wool Growers Association and the University of Idaho Foundation. He has also served in the past on the boards of directors of High Country News, Home Federal Bank, a small Idaho-based regional bank recently acquired by Bank of the Cascades, and the Idaho Foundation for Excellence in Education.

=== State senator (2001–2009) ===
Governor Dirk Kempthorne appointed Little to fill a state Senate vacancy in May 2001. He represented what was at the time District 8, which covered a part of Gem County surrounding and north of Emmett, all of Boise, Valley, and Adams Counties, and the southern portion of Idaho County.

After a change in district boundaries due to redistricting in 2001–02, Little was elected in the fall of 2002 to District 11, which then encompassed all of Gem County and the northern portion of Canyon County, including the communities of Middleton and Parma. He was reelected senator from the 11th legislative district four times. Little was also elected in 2003 by his Republican peers to the party leadership position of Majority Caucus Chair, which he held until 2009.

==== Committee assignments ====
- Agricultural Affairs 2002
- Resources and Environment 2002
- State Affairs 2003–2009
- Resources & Environment 2003–2009
- Transportation 2003–2009
- Economic Outlook
- Revenue Assessment

State Senator from District 11: 2002 results

Republican Party	Votes	Pct	Republican Party	Votes	Pct
Brad Little	3,865	72.1	Mike Pullin	1,498	27.9

Republican Party	Votes	Pct	Independent	Votes	Pct
Brad Little	8,478	76.2	John Steinebach	2,646	23.8

State Senator from District 11: 2004 results

Republican Party	Votes	Pct	Republican Party	Votes	Pct	Republican Party	Votes	Pct
Brad Little	3,402	65.00	Steven Thayn	1,398	26.71	Walter Bayes	434	8.29

Republican Party	Votes	Pct
Brad Little	13,533	100.00

State Senate from District 11: 2006 results

Republican Party	Votes	Pct	Constitution Party	Votes	Pct
Brad Little	10,090	77.05	Jared Eastley	3,006	22.95

State Senate from District 11: 2008 results

Republican Party	Votes	Pct	Independent	Votes	Pct
Brad Little	14,870	77.5	Kirsten Faith Richardson	4,309	22.5

=== Lieutenant governor of Idaho (2009–2019) ===
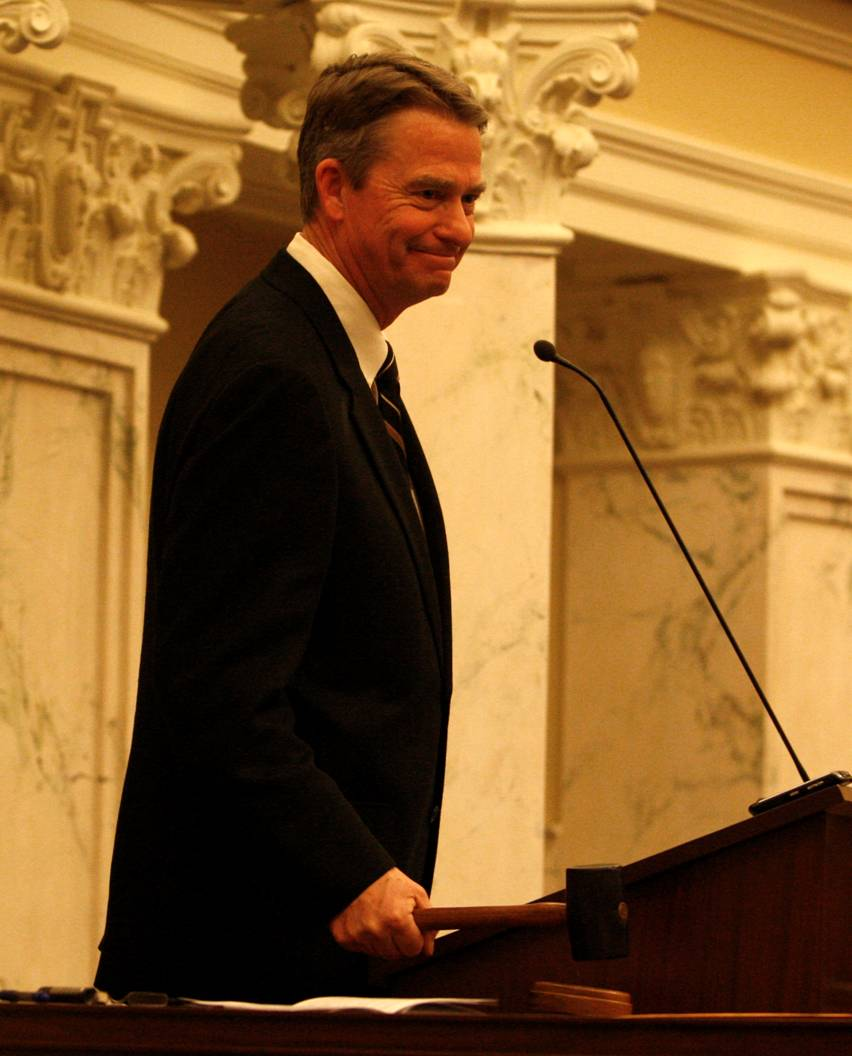
Little presiding over the Idaho Senate in 2011

==== Appointment, election and reelection ====
In January 2009, Governor Butch Otter appointed Little to the office of lieutenant governor to fill the vacancy left by former Lieutenant Governor Jim Risch's election to the U.S. Senate in 2008. Little was sworn in by Otter on January 6, 2009, and confirmed by unanimous consent when the Idaho Senate convened on January 12.

Little was elected lieutenant governor in 2010, defeating two opponents in the primary election and two opponents from the Democratic and Constitution parties in the general election. He was reelected in 2014.

Lieutenant Governor of Idaho: 2010 results: Republican Party / Votes / Pct / Republican Party / Votes / Pct / Republican Party / Votes / Pct; Brad Little / 95,758 / 67.6 / Joshua Blessinger / 26,808 / 18.9 / Steven Dana Pankey / 19,096 / 13.5
Republican Party	Votes	Pct	Democratic Party	Votes	Pct	Constitution Party	Votes	Pct
Brad Little	299,979	67.8%	Eldon Wallace	120,174	27.2%	Paul Venable	22,007	5.0%

Lieutenant Governor of Idaho: 2014 results: Republican Party / Votes / Pct / Republican Party / Votes / Pct; Brad Little / 96,780 / 66.8 / Jim Chmelik / 48,099 / 33.2
Republican Party	Votes	Pct	Democratic Party	Votes	Pct	Constitution Party	Votes	Pct
Brad Little	271,268	62.8%	Bert Marley	141,917	32.9%	David Hartigan	18,705	4.3%

==== Economic development and trade missions ====
Little focused on economic development as lieutenant governor, helping persuade energy bar producer Clif Bar to build a new food manufacturing plant in Idaho in 2013.

Little also took part in and led several trade missions. He led a Friendship Mission to the Basque Country in Spain in 2010, during which he met the President of the Basque Government Patxi López. During this meeting, Little and López agreed to establish a Basque Economic Development Office in Boise that "would provide resources and services for Idaho and Basque companies to ease collaboration on research, sales and collaborative programs." Little later signed the Euskadi-Idaho Friendship Agreement, which affirms the friendship and cultural affinity between the Basque Country and Idaho, which has the largest Basque community outside Spain.

Little was also a member of a 2011 Idaho trade delegation that traveled to Mexico and Brazil. After the trade mission, he said, "we found tremendous interest and opportunities in both countries for Idaho products and services … This trip strengthened key trade relationships and established new customers for Idaho businesses." The Idaho Department of Commerce estimated that the mission resulted in sales of more than $30 million.

==== Legislation ====
In the 2014 legislative session, Little sponsored Senate Bill 1354, an anti-"patent troll" bill. The bill protects companies from abusive or "bad faith assertions of patent infringement" to collect an extortionate licensing fee.

=== Governor of Idaho (2019–present) ===
==== 2018 election ====
In June 2016, Little announced his candidacy for the Idaho gubernatorial election in 2018. He said that Idaho National Laboratory would be a priority if he became governor.

Little was endorsed by incumbent Governor Otter, former governors Dirk Kempthorne and Phil Batt, and U.S. Senator Jim Risch.

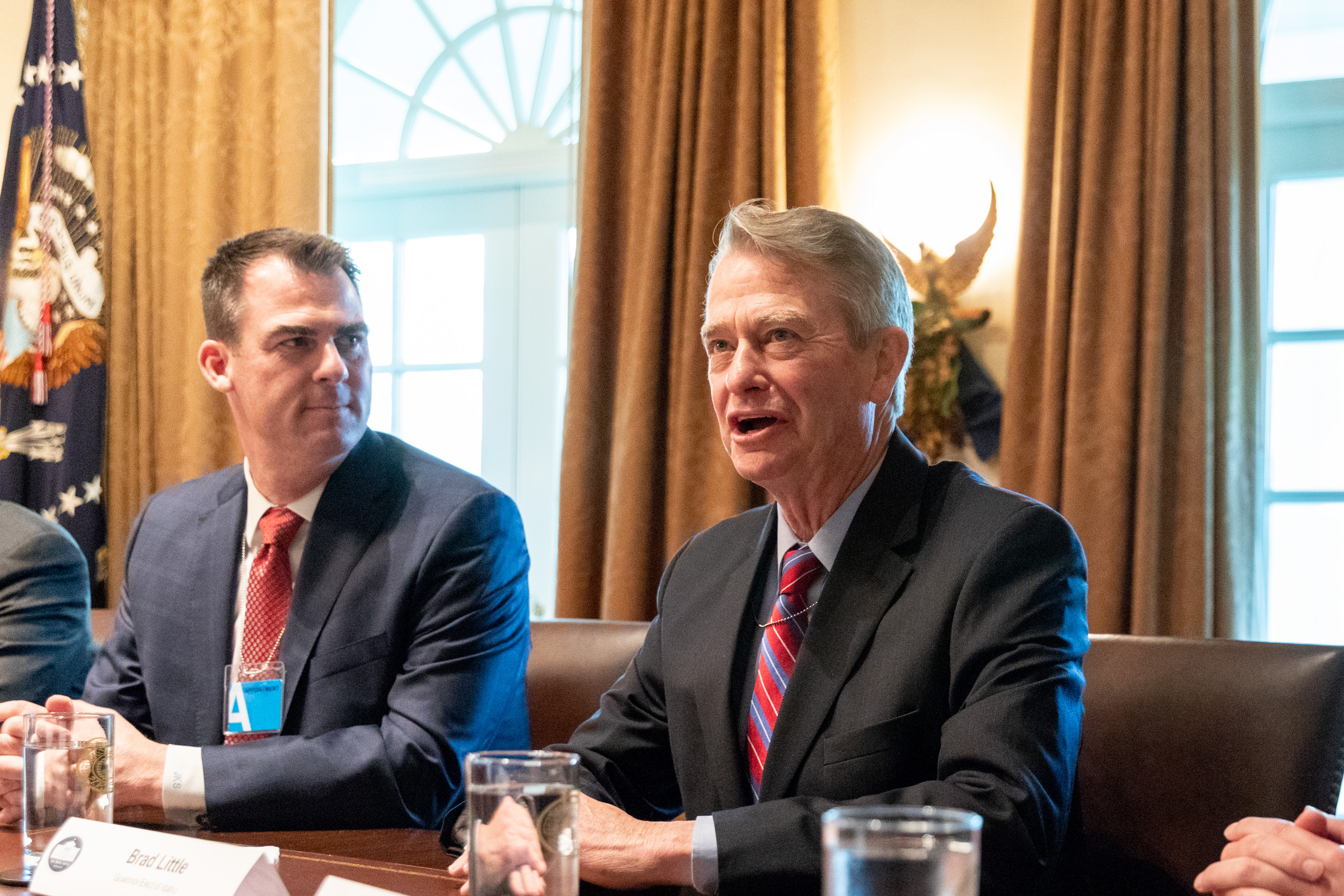
Little speaks during a meeting at the White House with President Trump and Vice President Pence and fellow governors-elect.

During his campaign, Little called for a phased-in $350 million reduction in the state income tax and the elimination of the Idaho grocery tax.

Little won the Idaho Republican Party primary, beating both U.S. Representative Raúl Labrador and businessman Tommy Ahlquist with 37.3% of the vote. In the general election in November, he defeated state Representative Paulette Jordan, the Idaho Democratic Party nominee, by over 130,000 votes.

==== 2022 reelection ====
In March 2022, Little filed papers to run for a second term in office, having announced his intention to run the previous month. He won the Republican nomination in May, defeating Lieutenant Governor Janice McGeachin.

The Democratic nominee in the race was Stephen Heidt. At the same time, an anti-government activist, Ammon Bundy, ran in the race as an independent. Little easily won the November 8 election, certifying the win in every county except Blaine County, which Heidt won.

==== Tenure ====
In March 2020, Little gained attention for signing two bills into law that addressed transgender people. The first bans transgender women and girls from competing in women's sports, citing possible unfair physical advantages. The second bill, HB 509, bans transgender people from changing the sex on their birth certificates.

In 2021, Little signed legislation that raised signature requirements for ballot initiatives. That year, he also signed legislation that would permit killing up to 90% of the state's estimated 1,500 wolves to the minimum level of 150 as set by Idaho's wolf conservation and management plan; the legislation was backed by the ranching sector of Idaho, but strongly opposed by environmental advocates.

== Political positions ==
=== Abortion ===
In late April 2021, Little signed House Bill 366, effectively prohibiting abortions after about six weeks of pregnancy, making exceptions for victims of rape, incest, and for medical emergencies. He also said, "We should never relent in our efforts to protect the lives of the preborn" and "Hundreds and hundreds of babies lose their lives every year in Idaho due to abortion, an absolute tragedy."

In March 2022, Little signed Senate Bill 1309 modeled after the Texas Heartbeat Act that prohibited abortions after about six weeks of pregnancy. The bill made exceptions for victims of rape, incest, and for medical emergencies. The Idaho Supreme Court later temporarily blocked the law.

In April 2023, Little signed State House Bill 242, which prohibits "recruiting, harboring, or transporting" minors across state lines for abortions without explicit parental consent. It also makes it illegal to obtain abortion pills for a minor. A conviction for "abortion trafficking" carries a minimum sentence of two years in state prison and a maximum of five years. This is the first anti-abortion bill to prosecute people who travel to states where abortions are legal to undergo the procedure.

=== Gun control ===
Little opposes gun control. In May 2021, he signed a bill that would thwart nearly a half-dozen of executive orders from President Joe Biden combating gun control. Little has an A+ grade from the NRA Political Victory Fund for his record on Second Amendment rights and was endorsed in the 2022 election.

=== LGBT rights ===
In March 2020, Little signed both House Bill 500 and House Bill 509, which ban transgender women from playing on women's athletic teams and prohibit people from changing their gender mark on their birth certificate.

In April 2023, Little signed House Bill 71 into law, banning anyone under the age of 18 from receiving puberty blockers, hormone therapy, or gender-affirming surgery beginning in 2024. Doctors who violate the law face up to ten years in prison. It offers no exemptions for minors currently taking puberty blockers or undergoing hormone therapy.

=== Marijuana ===
In a January 2019 interview, Little expressed opposition to legalizing recreational marijuana. He had expressed skepticism about legalizing medical marijuana for patients.

When being asked about marijuana legalization in April 2019, Little said: “If Idahoans want legal marijuana, they elected the wrong guy as governor.” NORML, a group advocating the legalization of marijuana, gave Little an F rating for his policies about reforming marijuana laws.

In February 2021, Little signed Senate Bill 1017, which raises the legal THC limit in cannabidiol (CBD) products from 0% to 0.1% THC. The law went into effect on July 1, 2021.

In April 2021, Little signed a bill that would legalize the cultivation and transportation of hemp in Idaho with up to 0.3% THC in it, making Idaho the final state to do so, but the bill would prohibit the sale of hemp products containing any THC.

=== Capital punishment ===
In March 2023, Little, who supports capital punishment, signed House Bill 186, which adds a firing squad as an alternative form of execution when lethal injection is not available. Idaho is the fifth state to pass such a bill. In March 2025, he signed a bill making firing squads the state's primary execution method. Idaho became the first state with such a policy.

Also in March 2025, Little signed a bill into law that permits the death penalty for rape and sexual abuse of children younger than 12. The law became effective on July 1, 2025. It could ultimately challenge the precedent of Kennedy v. Louisiana.

== Electoral history ==
Idaho gubernatorial elections: 2018
Year	Democratic	Votes	Pct	Republican	Votes	Pct	3rd Party	Party	Votes	Pct
2018	Paulette Jordan	231,081	38.2%	Brad Little	361,661	59.8%				
2022	Stephen Heidt	120,160	20.3%	Brad Little	358,598	60.5%	Ammon Bundy	Independent	101,835	17.2%

Idaho Gubernatorial Republican primary election, 2018
Party	Candidate	Votes	%
Republican	Brad Little	72,518	37.3
Republican	Raúl Labrador	63,460	32.6
Republican	Tommy Ahlquist	50,977	26.2
Republican	Lisa Marie	3,390	1.7
Republican	Steve Pankey	2,701	1.4
Republican	Harley Brown	874	0.4
Republican	Dalton Cannady	528	0.3
Total votes		194,448	100.0

Idaho Gubernatorial Republican primary election, 2022
Party	Candidate	Votes	%
Republican	Brad Little (incumbent)	148,831	52.8
Republican	Janice McGeachin	90,854	32.2
Republican	Ed Humphreys	30,877	11.0
Republican	Steve Bradshaw	5,470	1.9
Republican	Ashley Jackson	3,172	1.1
Republican	Lisa Marie	1,119	0.4
Republican	Ben Cannady	804	0.3
Republican	Cody Usabel	680	0.2
Total votes		281,807	100.0

== Personal life ==
Little married Teresa Soulen of Weiser in May 1978; they have two sons and six grandchildren.

Idaho Senate
Preceded by Judy Danielson	Member of the Idaho Senate from the 8th district 2001–2002	Succeeded by Skip Brandt
Preceded by Patti Anne Lodge	Member of the Idaho Senate from the 11th district 2002–2009	Succeeded by Melinda Smyser
Political offices
Preceded by Jim Risch	Lieutenant Governor of Idaho; 2009–2019	Succeeded by Janice McGeachin
Preceded by Butch Otter	Governor of Idaho; 2019–present	Incumbent
Party political offices
Preceded by Butch Otter	Republican nominee for Governor of Idaho; 2018, 2022, 2026	Most recent
U.S. order of precedence (ceremonial)
Preceded by JD Vance as Vice President	Order of precedence of the United States; Within Idaho	Succeeded by Mayor of city in which event is held
Preceded by JD Vance as Vice President	Order of precedence of the United States; Within Idaho	Succeeded by Otherwise Mike Johnson as Speaker of the House
Preceded by Bob Ferguson as Governor of Washington	Order of precedence of the United States; Outside Idaho	Succeeded by Mark Gordon as Governor of Wyoming
