= List of University of Idaho College of Law alumni =

Famous University of Idaho College of Law graduates
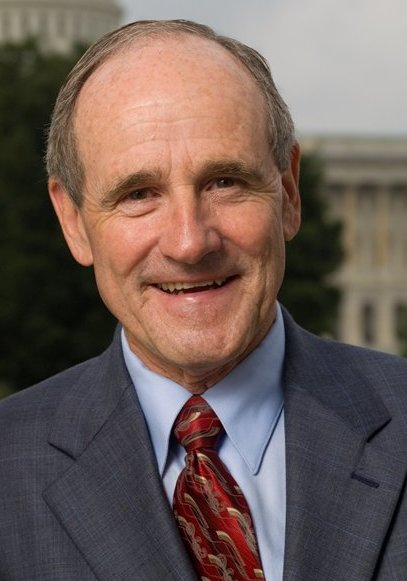
Jim Risch '68, U.S. Senator

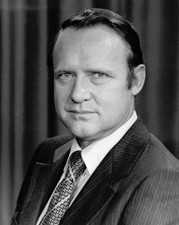
Jim McClure '50, U.S. Senator

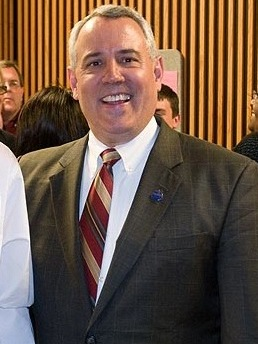
Dave Bieter '86, Mayor of Boise

Notable alumni of the University of Idaho College of Law.

== Federal judges ==
=== U.S. Circuit judges ===
- Blaine Anderson, class of 1949, United States Court of Appeals for the Ninth Circuit (1976–88), District Court Judge for the District of Idaho (1971–76)
- Danielle Forrest, class of 2004, United States Court of Appeals for the Ninth Circuit (2019–present)
- Thomas Nelson, class of 1962 (LL.B.), United States Court of Appeals for the Ninth Circuit (1990–2003), senior judge (2003–11)

=== U.S. District judges ===
- Amanda Brailsford, class of 1993, District of Idaho (2023–present), Idaho Court of Appeals (2019–23)
- Edward Lodge, class of 1961 (LL.B), District of Idaho (1989–2015), senior judge (2015–19), bankruptcy judge (1988–89)
- Ray McNichols, class of 1950 (LL.B), District of Idaho (1964–85), senior judge (1981–85)
- Harold L. Ryan, class of 1950 (LL.B), District of Idaho (1981–92), senior judge (1992–95)
- Fred Taylor, class of 1926 (LL.B), District of Idaho (1954–71), senior judge (1971–88)

== State judges ==
=== Supreme Court justices ===
- Donald Anderson, class of 1927 (LL.B), Idaho Supreme Court (1955–56)
- Robert Bakes, class of 1956 (LL.B), Idaho Supreme Court (1971–93); Chief Justice (198x–83, 1989–93)
- Stephen Bistline, class of 1949, Idaho Supreme Court (1976–94)
- Larry Boyle, class of 1972, Idaho Supreme Court (1989–92), U.S. Magistrate Judge (1992–2008)
- Roger Burdick, class of 1974, Idaho Supreme Court (2003–21); Chief Justice (2011–15, 2017–20)
- Charles Donaldson, class of 1948 (LL.B), Idaho Supreme Court (1969–87); Chief Justice (1983–87)
- Dan Eismann, class of 1976, Idaho Supreme Court (2001–17); Chief Justice (2007–11)
- Joel Horton, class of 1985, Idaho Supreme Court (2007–18)
- Robert Huntley, class of 1959, Idaho Supreme Court (1982–89)
- Paul Hyatt, class of 1927 (LL.B), Idaho Supreme Court (1947–49)
- Wayne Kidwell, class of 1964, Idaho Supreme Court (1999–2004), Attorney General of Idaho (1975–79)
- Emery Knudson, class of 1921 (LL.B), Idaho Supreme Court (1959–65)
- Robert Leeper, class of 1913 (LL.B), Idaho Supreme Court (1932)
- Charles McDevitt, class of 1956 (LL.B), Idaho Supreme Court (1989–97); Chief Justice (1993–97)
- Joseph McFadden, Idaho Supreme Court (1959–82); Chief Justice
- Henry McQuade, class of 1943, Idaho Supreme Court (1956–76); Chief Justice
- John Stegner, class of 1982, Idaho Supreme Court (2018–23)
- Clarence Taylor, class of 1919 (LL.B), Idaho Supreme Court (1949–69), Chief Justice
- Darwin Thomas, class of 1925 (LL.B), Idaho Supreme Court (1951–54)
- Linda Copple Trout, class of 1977, Idaho Supreme Court (1992–2007); Chief Justice (1997–2004)
- Jesse Walters, class of 1963, Idaho Supreme Court (1997–2003), judge on the Idaho Court of Appeals (1982–97)
- Colleen Zahn, class of 2000, Idaho Supreme Court (2021–present)

=== Court of Appeals judges ===
- Michael Gibbons, class of 1980, Nevada Court of Appeals (2015–present)
- Molly Huskey, class of 1993, Idaho Court of Appeals (2015–present)

== Politicians ==
=== Executive Branch ===
==== Governor ====
- Jim Risch, class of 1968, Governor (2006–07), U.S. Senator (2009–present), Lieutenant Governor (2003–06, 2007–09)

==== Lieutenant governor ====
- David Leroy, class of 1971, Lieutenant Governor (1983–87), Idaho Attorney General (1979–83)

==== Attorneys general ====
- Tony Park, class of 1963, Idaho Attorney General (1971–75)
- Bob Robson, class of 194x (LL.B), Idaho Attorney General (1969–71)
- Lawrence Wasden, class of 1985, Idaho Attorney General (2003–23)

==== United States attorneys ====
- Bart Davis, class of 1980, United States Attorney for Idaho (2017–21)
- Thomas E. Moss, United States Attorney for Idaho (2001–2010)

==== Other Executive Branch officials ====
- Dave Bieter, class of 1986, Mayor of Boise (2004–2020)
- Hamer Budge, class of 1936, chairman of the Securities and Exchange Commission (1969–71), U.S. Representative from 2nd district (1951–61)
- Abe Goff, class of 1924 (LL.B), commissioner on the Interstate Commerce Commission, U.S. Representative from 1st district (1947–49)

=== Legislative Branch ===
==== U.S. Senator ====
- Jim McClure, class of 1950 (LL.B.), U.S. Senator from Idaho (1973–91), U.S. Representative from Idaho's first congressional district (1967–73)
- Herman Welker, class of 1929 (LL.B), U.S. Senator from Idaho (1951–57)

==== U.S. House of Representatives ====
- Bill Sali, class of 1984, U.S. Representative from Idaho's first congressional district (2007–09)

== Business Leaders ==
- Frank Shrontz, class of 1954 (LL.B), chairman and chief executive officer of Boeing
