= LGBTQ rights in Idaho =

- Idaho (US)
- Legal status: Legal since 2003
- Gender identity: Case law in the state requires the state to change birth certificates for transgender people
- Discrimination protections: Protections in employment; some municipalities have passed further protections

Family rights
- Recognition of relationships: Same-sex marriage since 2014
- Adoption: Same-sex couples may adopt jointly

Lesbian, gay, bisexual, transgender, and queer (LGBTQ) people in the U.S. state of Idaho face some legal challenges not experienced by non-LGBTQ people. Same-sex sexual activity in Idaho was made legal through the 2003 Lawrence v. Texas decision, and same-sex marriage has been legal in the state since October 2014. In 2022, Idaho's defunct sodomy statute was formally repealed. State statutes do not address discrimination based on sexual orientation and gender identity; however, the U.S. Supreme Court's ruling in Bostock v. Clayton County established that employment discrimination against LGBTQ people is illegal under federal law. A number of cities and counties provide further protections, namely in housing and public accommodations. A 2019 Public Religion Research Institute opinion poll showed that 71% of Idahoans supported anti-discrimination legislation protecting LGBTQ people, and a 2016 survey by the same pollster found majority support for same-sex marriage.

== History ==
Sodomy laws were enacted during the time of the creation of the Idaho Territory in the mid-19th century. Settlement by a large number of European-American immigrants introduced Christianity to the region, resulting in negative attitudes towards homosexuality. Prior to this, several Native American tribes inhabited the area. These people groups had perceptions of gender and sexuality different from that of the Western world. For instance, the Kootenai people recognize individuals who act, behave and perform tasks typically associated with the opposite gender. The kupatke'tek are male-bodied individuals who act as women, while the titqattek are female-bodied individuals who act as men and would become skilled hunters and warriors. In stories, they were regarded as supernatural beings, being able to see into the future and cure illnesses. Similarly, the Coeur d'Alene people recognize the term st'amia, which refers to female-bodied individuals who live as men. There were no known legal or social punishments for engaging in homosexual activity among these tribes.

The Idaho Territory enacted a sodomy statute in 1864, punishing anal intercourse, whether heterosexual or homosexual, with five years' to life imprisonment. It was extended to include fellatio (oral sex) in 1916 in State v. Altwatter. In 1925, the state passed a sterilization law, providing for the possible forced vasectomy or salpingectomy of "habitual criminals, moral degenerates and sexual perverts". The legislation was repealed in 1972, having only been used on the "mentally retarded". The sodomy statute criminalized consensual acts as well, a point noted in numerous court cases including State v. Moore and State v. Wilson (both decided in 1956), in which two men were independently imprisoned for consensual same-sex sexual activity.

Homosexuality entered increasingly more into the public eye from the 1950s onwards, especially after the Boise homosexuality scandal, at which time it was commonly regarded as a mental illness. In 1971, Idaho passed a law repealing the sodomy statute, to take effect on January 1, 1972, but following opposition by Catholic and Mormon groups, the state overturned the new law and reinstated the original law on April 1, 1972. Starting in the late 20th century and into the 21st century, acceptance and tolerance of LGBTQ people grew significantly. Consensual sodomy would remain illegal in Idaho for married heterosexual couples until 1995 (State v. Holden) and for same-sex couples and unmarried heterosexual couples until 2003 (Lawrence v. Texas).

== Laws regarding same-sex sexual activity ==
The U.S. Supreme Court's 2003 decision in Lawrence v. Texas rendered laws banning consensual sexual activity unenforceable, including Idaho's.

In September 2020, an Idaho man, who was forced to register as a sex offender after having had consensual oral sex with his wife 20 years prior in another state, filed suit against the state.

In April 2021 a Montana man appealed a sex offender registration requirement for violating Idaho's crimes against nature law in 1993 with two 16-year-old males when he was 18 at Pratt ranch in Gem County, he had served a lengthy 7-year prison term in Idaho before having to register as a sex offender for the consensual sex with the two males. Heterosexual sex between a 16 year old and an 18 year old is legal in Idaho as long as it does not violate the crime against nature statute which bans same sex activity generally.

In March 2022, the Idaho Legislature passed a bill to formally repeal the "reinstalled" 1972 sodomy law from the Idaho code. The Governor of Idaho signed the bill into law, which took effect on July 1, 2022.

== Recognition of same-sex relationships ==
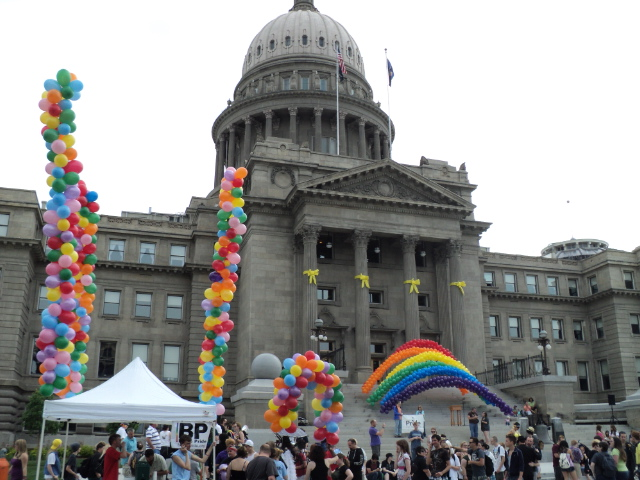
Boise Pride 2011 at the Idaho State Capitol

Idaho voters adopted a constitutional amendment in November 2006 stating that "A marriage between a man and a woman is the only domestic legal union that shall be valid or recognized in this state." Similar restrictions had been incorporated in the state's statutes in the 1990s. A ruling in the case of Latta v. Otter on May 13, 2014, found these prohibitions unconstitutional. Enforcement of the ruling in that case had been stayed while the case was appealed to the Ninth Circuit Court of Appeals.

On October 7, 2014, the Ninth Circuit upheld the district court ruling that found the state's denial of marriage rights to same-sex couples unconstitutional. State officials failed to receive a stay from the U.S. Supreme Court while they pursued further appeals, and Idaho Governor Butch Otter announced the state would no longer attempt to preserve its denial of marriage rights to same-sex couples. On October 15, 2014, approximately 100 same-sex couples obtained marriage licenses at the Ada County clerk's offices.

== Adoption and parenting ==
Idaho permits adoption by "any adult person". There are no explicit prohibitions on adoption by same-sex couples or on second-parent adoptions. On February 11, 2014, the Idaho Supreme Court unanimously overturned a lower court ruling and held that an adoptive parent need not be married. It returned to the lower court the adoption petition of an Idaho woman who had married another woman in California and sought to adopt her wife's two teenage sons.

Lesbian couples can access assisted reproduction services, such as in vitro fertilization. State law recognizes the non-genetic, non-gestational mother as a legal parent to a child born via donor insemination, but only if the parents are married.

Idaho law does not regulate the practice of surrogacy. State courts have generally been favorable to couples, same-sex or opposite-sex, who have used the gestational or traditional surrogacy process.

== Discrimination protections ==
Map of Idaho counties and cities that had sexual orientation and/or gender identity anti–employment discrimination ordinances prior to Bostock Sexual orientation and gender identity with anti–employment discrimination ordinance Sexual orientation and gender identity solely in public employment Sexual orientation in public employment Does not protect sexual orientation and gender identity in employment

=== Local laws ===
The following Idaho counties and cities have ordinances prohibiting discrimination on the basis of sexual orientation and gender identity (representing about 40% of the state population): Ada County, Bellevue, Boise, Coeur d'Alene, Driggs, Hailey, Idaho Falls, Ketchum, Lewiston, Meridian, Moscow, Pocatello, Sandpoint, and Victor. The city of Twin Falls has an ordinance prohibiting city employment discrimination on the basis of sexual orientation only. Latah County bans discrimination against county employees on account of their sexual orientation and gender identity.

On May 20, 2014, the voters of Pocatello, by a 50.41% to 49.59% vote, rejected Proposition 1, an initiative that would have repealed the city's ordinance that prohibits discrimination with regard to housing, employment and public accommodations based on a person's sexual orientation or gender identity and gender expression.

=== State laws ===
No provision of Idaho law explicitly addresses discrimination on the basis of sexual orientation or gender identity.

On November 8, 1994, the voters of Idaho, by a 50.38% to 49.62% vote, rejected Initiative 1, an initiative that would have forbid state and local governments from granting minority status and rights based on homosexual behavior.

On February 10, 2012, the Senate State Affairs Committee, by a 7–2 vote, rejected a bill that would have banned discrimination based on sexual orientation and gender identity in jobs, housing, educational opportunities and public accommodations.

In April 2014, a series of protests collectively known as Add The Words, Idaho resulted in numerous arrests.

In 2015, a bill to add sexual orientation and gender identity nondiscrimination language made some progress, after having been denied a hearing in each of the preceding nine years. On January 15, 2015, the House Ways and Means Committee voted 6–1 to hold a hearing, but on January 29, the House State Affairs Committee voted 13–4 against the bill.

In January 2021, a similar nondiscrimination bill was again introduced to the Idaho Legislature.

=== Bostock v. Clayton County ===
On June 15, 2020, the U.S. Supreme Court ruled in Bostock v. Clayton County, consolidated with Altitude Express, Inc. v. Zarda, and in R.G. & G.R. Harris Funeral Homes Inc. v. Equal Employment Opportunity Commission that discrimination in the workplace on the basis of sexual orientation or gender identity is discrimination on the basis of sex, and Title VII therefore protects LGBT employees from discrimination.

== Hate crime law ==
Idaho law does not address hate crimes based on gender identity or sexual orientation. However, since the Matthew Shepard and James Byrd, Jr. Hate Crimes Prevention Act was signed into law in October 2009, U.S. federal law has addressed crimes motivated by the victim's actual or perceived sexual orientation or gender identity. Hate crimes against LGBTQ people can be prosecuted in federal court.

== Transgender rights ==
In January 2026, a 2018 birth certificate implementation law was allowed to go into legal effect - banning any change of sex whatsoever on a birth certificate within Idaho. Only biological sex as either male or female at the time you were born at birth is permitted.

In September 2024, transgender prisoners within Idaho are permitted to have hormone therapy - under a court ruling by a federal judge. The 1997 law banning hormone therapy on prisoners is nullified and void.

In August 2024, the Idaho Governor signed an executive order on banning any/all federal laws, regulations and guidelines regarding gender identity/ideology from applying within Idaho’s state borders.

Poe v. Labrador
- Court: District of Idaho
- Started: May 31, 2023
- Docket nos.: 1:23-cv-00269 (D. Idaho); 24-142 (9th Cir.); 23A763 (SCOTUS)

Case history
- Appealed to: Ninth Circuit
- Subsequent action: district ruling stayed by supreme court via shadow docket

Court membership
- Judge sitting: B. Lynn Winmill

In April 2024, the US Supreme Court upheld the ban on puberty blockers, gender-affirming healthcare and sexual reassignment surgery on children and minors (that overturned a lower court decision) - the Idaho law was passed, signed and implemented back in 2020.

=== Pronoun restrictions ===
In February 2024, a bill passed the Idaho House of Representatives to "exclusively recognise male and female, not others" - throughout the Idaho Code only. The bill is pending within the Idaho Senate.

In April 2024, the Governor of Idaho signed a bill into law banning usage of pronouns which are not based on birth certificate - on students and pupils - by teachers and education agencies within schools and classrooms.

=== Identity documents ===
From April 6, 2018, onwards, transgender people in Idaho were allowed to change their birth certificate to accurately reflect their gender identity. The ruling was labelled "a huge win" by transgender activists, who in 2017 had filed a lawsuit challenging the state law. While arguing that transgender people "already face disproportionately high levels of discrimination", the judge asserted that such discrepancies "can create risks to the health and safety of transgender people" and that said discrepancies were "archaic, unjust and discriminatory". On March 30, 2020, Governor Brad Little, attempting to overturn the court ruling, signed legislation (HB 509) barring transgender individuals from changing the sex marker on their birth certificate and prohibiting transgender athletes from competing in sports teams in public school and university settings.

The law went into preliminary effect on July 1, 2020, but arguments against it were heard in court on July 22, 2020. On August 7, 2020, before it took permanent effect, District Court Judge David C. Nye said it was moot and unenforceable. The state planned to appeal. In June 2022, the court awarded attorneys' fees to the winning side, and in August 2022, the Idaho Board of Examiners approved the amount of $321,000. It will be paid with taxpayer funds to the civil rights group Lambda Legal.

Since March 2019, Idaho allows for a third gender option (known as "X") on driver's licenses and state ID cards. The outcome of the August 7, 2020 ruling is that anyone applying to change gender markers on driver's licenses and state IDs must submit to the Idaho Department of Transportation a letter from a physician certifying that sex reassignment surgery has been performed.

In November 2019, the Idaho Board of Health and Welfare abolished a rule that required a doctor's approval for a gender change for transgender minors but retained parental permission, the minor being emancipated, or a court order.

=== Gender-affirming care ===
On July 1st 2024, HB668 came into force and severely restricted gender affirming care for minors and adults within the state of Idaho. It banned gender affirming care if:

1. It was provided by any state, local or county health care professionals or
2. It was provided by Idaho Medicaid (~16% of Idahoans use Idaho's Medicaid) or
3. It was provided on state property (including hospitals, public colleges and prisons).

It does not restrict counselling or mental health services but severely limits medical gender affirming care (mainly HRT & GAS) in the state of Idaho. Opponents, namely the ACLU call it discriminatory, a threat to parental rights and contradictory to legal precedents. There is also evidence to suggest it violates the ACA and contradicts with existing state and federal Medicaid rules. The bill also prevents the medical care from being tax-deductible.

On April 4, 2023, Governor Brad Little signed HB 71, banning puberty blockers, hormones and surgeries for minors and making it a felony for any doctor to help a child seek gender-affirming care. The previous month had also seen legislation governing pronouns in schools and bathroom use in all public places.

Previously, in March 2022, HB 675 had passed the Idaho House of Representatives. The bill would have made it a felony to provide gender-affirming medical care to transgender youth, and parents who brought their children out-of-state to receive it would have faced life in prison. The Idaho Senate blocked the bill, citing parents rights' and government overreach.

=== Sports ===
On March 30, 2020, Governor Brad Little, attempted to overturn the court ruling, signed legislation (HB 509) barring transgender individuals from changing the sex marker on their birth certificate and prohibiting transgender athletes from competing in sports teams in public school and university settings.

=== Forced outing ===
Under state law passed in March 2026, schools, childcare providers, and medical professionals are required to out transgender minors to their parents within three days of learning of the minor's trans status.

=== Segregated facilities ===
In March 2026, the Idaho House of Representatives passed a law making it a felony for a trans person to use a bathroom, changing room, or other gender-segregated facility not matching their assigned sex in any publicly owned building or private business. It passed the Idaho Senate later that month. The bathroom bill received criticism for being difficult to enforce, and Democratic lawmakers accused their Republican colleagues of legislating against the existence of trans people, but Senate sponsor Ben Toews defended the bill, saying that it was meant to target sexual predators. On June 16, two weeks before the law was set to take effect, U.S. District Judge Amanda Brailsford ruled that it could not be enforced against a person using a single-stall restroom, nor a person using a multi-user restroom when there is no unoccupied single-user restroom on the same floor. This means the law can still be enforced against someone who chooses a multi-user restroom when they have the immediate, nearby option of a single-user restroom.

== Public opinion ==
Recent opinion polls have shown that support for LGBTQ people across the U.S. state of Idaho is increasing and opposition is decreasing.

A 2017 Public Religion Research Institute (PRRI) opinion poll found that 56% of Idaho residents supported same-sex marriage, while 32% opposed it and 13% were unsure.The same poll found that 68% of Idahoans supported an anti-discrimination law covering sexual orientation and gender identity. 24% were opposed. Furthermore, 51% were against allowing public businesses to refuse to serve LGBTQ people due to religious beliefs, while 40% supported allowing such religiously based refusals.

A 2022 Public Religion Research Institute (PRRI) poll found that 64% of Idaho residents supported same-sex marriage, while 36% opposed. Additionally, 80% of Idaho residents supported discrimination protections covering sexual orientation and gender identity. 19% were opposed.

Public opinion for LGBTQ anti-discrimination laws in Idaho
Poll source	Date(s) administered	Sample size	Margin of error	% support	% opposition	% no opinion
Public Religion Research Institute	January 2-December 30, 2019	381	?	71%	23%	6%
Public Religion Research Institute	January 3-December 30, 2018	359	?	68%	25%	7%
Public Religion Research Institute	April 5-December 23, 2017	461	?	68%	24%	8%
Public Religion Research Institute	April 29, 2015-January 7, 2016	471	?	70%	25%	5%

== Summary table ==
Same-sex sexual activity legal	Yes (Since 2003; codified in 2022)
Equal age of consent (16)	Yes (Since 2003)
Anti-discrimination laws in employment	Yes (Since 2020)
Anti-discrimination laws in housing	No / Yes (In some cities and counties only)
Anti-discrimination laws in public accommodations	No / Yes (In some cities and counties only)
Anti-discrimination laws in schools and colleges	No / Yes (In some cities and counties only)
Same-sex marriages	Yes / No (Since 2014; banned in the Nez Perce Reservation since 2019)
Joint and stepchild adoption by same-sex couples	Yes
Lesbian, gay and bisexual people allowed to serve openly in the military	Yes (Since 2011)
Transgender people allowed to serve openly in the military	No (Since 2025)
Intersex people allowed to serve openly in the military	(Current DoD policy bans "hermaphrodites" from serving or enlisting in the military)
Transgender athletes allowed to participate in sports	No (Since 2020; enforcement currently stayed by federal judge)
Third gender option	No / Yes (Not available for birth certificates, but available for driver's licenses and state IDs)
Conversion therapy banned on minors	No
Gay panic defense abolished	No
Right to change legal gender on driver's licenses and state ID cards	Yes
Right to change legal gender on birth certificates	Yes
Equal access to IVF for lesbian couples	Yes
Surrogacy arrangements legal for gay male couples	Yes
MSMs allowed to donate blood	Yes

== See also ==
- LGBTQ rights in the United States
- Politics and LGBTQ in the US
- LGBT rights by country or territory
