= List of first women lawyers and judges in Idaho =

This is a list of the first women lawyer(s) and judge(s) in Idaho. It includes the year in which the women were admitted to practice law (in parentheses). Also included are women who achieved other distinctions such becoming the first in their state to graduate from law school or become a political figure.

== Firsts in Idaho's history ==
=== Lawyers ===
- First female: Helen Young (1895)
- First female prosecutor: Kate E. Nevile Feltham (1914) in 1926
- First female to practice before the U.S. Supreme Court: Mazellah (M.) Pearl McCall (1919) in 1924
- First female to argue a case before the Supreme Court of Idaho: Adelyne Martha Burrus Champers (1927) in 1929
- First Japanese American female: Rei Kihara Osaki (1943)
- First Hispanic American female: Joanne P. Rodriguez (1983)
- First African American female: Ida Leggett (1986)
- First Native American (Cherokee/Shoshone) female: Cassandra Lee Furr Dunn (1974)

=== Law Clerks ===
- First female to clerk for the Supreme Court of Idaho: Mary Schmitt (1940) in 1941
- First female to clerk for the U.S. District Court in Idaho: Ina Mae Wheeler Hanford (1952) in 1952

=== State judges ===
- First female (non-attorney judge): Margaret Geisler in 1939
- First female: Mary Jensen Smith Oldham (1935) in 1945
- First female (youngest at time of her appointment): Zoe Ann Warberg Shaub (1960) in 1961
- First female (state magistrate): Linda Cook (1973) in 1976
- First female (district court): Deborah A. Bail (1975) in 1983
- First female (Third Judicial District Court): Juneal Kerrick (1981) in 1987
- First female (Idaho Court of Appeals): Cathy Silak (1976) in 1990
- First African American (female): Ida Leggett (1986) in 1992
- First female (Idaho Supreme Court): Linda Copple Trout (1977) in 1992
- First female (Idaho Supreme Court; Chief Justice): Linda Copple Trout (1977) in 1997

=== Federal judges ===
- First female (federal level–magistrate judge; United States District Court for the District of Idaho): Candy Dale in 2008
- First female (judge; United States District Court for the District of Idaho): Amanda Brailsford in 2023

=== Deputy Attorney General ===
- First female (Deputy Assistant): Susan Maria Flandro (1968) in 1968

=== United States Attorney ===
- First female: Betty H. Richardson (1982) from 1993-2001

=== Assistant United States Attorney ===
- First female: Mary Hobson in 1978

=== Prosecuting Attorney ===
- First female: Kate E. Nevile Feltham (1914) in 1926

=== Idaho State Bar Association ===
- First female president: Kaye O'Riordan in 1988

== Firsts in local history ==
- Mary Elizabeth Schmitt (1940): First female lawyer in south-central Idaho (specifically Canyon County, Idaho)
- Karen Jean Orndorff Vehlow (1975): First female appointed as a Deputy Prosecutor (1975) and magistrate (1977) in Ada County, Idaho
- Jan M. Bennetts: First female Prosecuting Attorney for Ada County, Idaho (2014)
- Barbara Buchanan: First female district court judge in Bonner County, Idaho (2013)
- Stacey DePew: First female judge in Jerome County, Idaho (2018)
- Megan Marshall: First female judge in Latah County, Idaho (2018)
- Alberta Morton Phillips (1941): First female to teach law at the University of Idaho [Latah County, Idaho]
- Mary Jensen Smith Oldham (1935): First female lawyer in Rexburg, Idaho [Madison County, Idaho]
- Kate E. Nevile Feltham (1914): First female Prosecuting Attorney for Washington County, Idaho (1926)

== See also ==
- List of first women lawyers and judges in the United States
- Timeline of women lawyers in the United States
- Women in law

== Other topics of interest ==
- List of first minority male lawyers and judges in the United States
- List of first minority male lawyers and judges in Idaho
