= List of first minority male lawyers and judges in Idaho =

This is a list of the first minority male lawyer(s) and judge(s) in Idaho. It includes the year in which they were admitted to practice law (in parentheses). Also included are other distinctions, such as the first minority men in their state to graduate from law school or become a political figure.

== Firsts in Idaho's history ==
=== Lawyers ===
- First African American male to pass bar exam: Joseph R. Mitchem in 1908
- First African American male (admitted to Idaho State Bar): Reginald Ray Reeves (1952)
- First Latino American male: Ernesto G. Sanchez (1973)

=== State judges ===
- First Latino American male: Sergio A. Gutierrez in 1993
- First Latino American male (Idaho Court of Appeals): Sergio A. Gutierrez in 2002
- First African American male: Dayo O. Onanubosi (1993) in 2009

=== Attorney General of Idaho ===
- First Native American male (Pawnee Nation): Larry Echo Hawk from 1991-1995
- First Hispanic American male: Raúl Labrador in 2023

== Firsts in local history ==
- Dayo O. Onanubosi (1993): First African American male appointed as a magistrate judge for Canyon County, Idaho (2009)
- Reginald Ray Reeves (1952): First African American male to graduate from the University of Idaho College of Law (1952) [Moscow County, Idaho]

== See also ==
- List of first minority male lawyers and judges in the United States

== Other topics of interest ==
- List of first women lawyers and judges in the United States
- List of first women lawyers and judges in Idaho
