= Rei Kihara Osaki =

American lawyer

Rei Kihara
- Born: December 16, 1918; Wapato, Washington, U.S
- Died: November 15, 2006 (aged 87); Pasadena, California, U.S.
- Education: Washington State University; University of Idaho College of Law
- Occupation: Lawyer

Rei Kihara Osaki (December 16, 1918 – November 15, 2006) was the first Japanese American female lawyer in Idaho.

Osaki was born on December 16, 1918, in Wapato, Washington, and raised on a farm in Harrah. She graduated with a political science degree from the Washington State University in 1940. Upon attending the University of Idaho College of Law, Osaki narrowly avoided being interned at a Japanese internment camp during World War II. Her immediate family members were not so fortunate, and a disheartened Osaki still pursued her law studies due to the encouragement of her father.

In 1943, Osaki became the first Japanese American female to graduate from the University of Idaho College of Law and to be admitted to the Idaho State Bar. She then worked as an attorney in Wisconsin and the Office of Price Administration in Chicago. She appeared before the U.S. Court of Appeal during her employment with the office. She settled in California with her husband, Harry Osaki, (a goldsmith) thereafter and permanently retired from law practice. Osaki instead became politically active, and became a member of the Nikkei for Civil Rights and Redress (NCRR). The group's lobbying efforts ultimately led to the passing of the Civil Liberties Act of 1988.

Osaki died on November 15, 2006, in Pasadena, California.

== See also ==
- List of first women lawyers and judges in Idaho
