= Patti Anne Lodge =

American politician and educator

Member of the Idaho Senate
- In office December 1, 2000 – November 30, 2022
- Preceded by: Atwell Parry
- Succeeded by: Chris Trakel (redistricting)
- Constituency: 11th district (2000–2002); 13th district (2002–2012); 11th district (2012–2022)

Personal details
- Born: July 29, 1942 (age 83) Pittsburgh, Pennsylvania
- Party: Republican
- Spouse: Edward Lodge
- Profession: Consultant
- Website: pattiannelodge.net

Patti Anne Lodge (born July 29, 1942) is an American politician who served as a Republican Idaho State Senator representing District 11 from 2012 to 2022. She previously represented District 13 of the Idaho Senate from 2002 to 2012 and District 11 from 2000-2002.

== Early life and career ==
Born in Pittsburgh, Pennsylvania, Lodge moved to Idaho at age four, where she attended Boise State University, Idaho State University, Northwest Nazarene University, and the University of Idaho. She received her BA in 1964, at Marylhurst University in Oregon.

She has been a consultant at Saint Paul’s School, Our Lady of the Valley since 1999, and president of Wind Ridge Vineyards since 1988.

She was previously a media educator at Caldwell School District from 1968 to 1999 and media coordinator at Caldwell School District from 1982 to 1997.

She was in the Legislative Council from 2002 to 2006.

She is a member of the American Legislative Exchange Council (ALEC), serving as Idaho state leader.

== Elections ==
District 11 Senate - Part of Canyon County
Year	Candidate	Votes	Pct	Candidate	Votes	Pct	Candidate	Votes	Pct	Candidate	Votes	Pct
2000 Primary	Patti Anne Lodge	3,193	57.7%	Sid Sagers	1,093	19.7%	Earl Maggard	764	13.8%	Larry Smith	485	8.8%
2000 General	Patti Anne Lodge	11,556	72.3%	Dale Wheeler	4,420	27.7%						

District 13 Senate - Part of Canyon County
Year	Candidate	Votes	Pct	Candidate	Votes	Pct	Candidate	Votes	Pct
2002 Primary	Patti Anne Lodge (incumbent)	3,057	65.1%	Wendall Cass	1,642	34.9%			
2002 General	Patti Anne Lodge (incumbent)	8,886	70.0%	Corrine Tafoya Fisher	3,803	30.0%			
2004 Primary	Patti Anne Lodge (incumbent)	3,746	70.6%	Ronald Harriman	1,559	29.4%			
2004 General	Patti Anne Lodge (incumbent)	15,734	100%						
2006 Primary	Patti Anne Lodge (incumbent)	5,032	100%						
2006 General	Patti Anne Lodge (incumbent)	11,101	71.2%	Rohn Webb	3,807	24.4%	Bryant Neal	679	4.4%
2008 Primary	Patti Anne Lodge (incumbent)	5,181	100%						
2008 General	Patti Anne Lodge (incumbent)	16,269	73.0%	Dan Romero	6,028	27.0%			
2010 Primary	Patti Anne Lodge (incumbent)	5,178	100%						
2010 General	Patti Anne Lodge (incumbent)	12,711	78.5%	Chris Breshears	3,487	21.5%			

District 11 Senate - Part of Canyon County
Year	Candidate	Votes	Pct	Candidate	Votes	Pct	Candidate	Votes	Pct
2012 Primary	Patti Anne Lodge (incumbent)	3,469	59.8%	Maurice Clements	2,331	40.2%			
2012 General	Patti Anne Lodge (incumbent)	12,872	75.9%	Victoria Brown	4,092	24.1%			
2014 Primary	Patti Anne Lodge (incumbent)	3,046	63.3%	Gregory Collett	1,767	36.7%			
2014 General	Patti Anne Lodge (incumbent)	9,673	77.5%	Rita Burns	2,814	22.5%			
2016 Primary	Patti Anne Lodge (incumbent)	2,429	52.9 %	Zach Brooks	2,166	47.1%			
2016 General	Patti Anne Lodge (incumbent)	14,206	72.6%	Pat Day Hartwell	3,302	16.9%	Gregory Collett	2,048	10.5%
2018 Primary	Patti Anne Lodge (incumbent)	3,407	51.6%	Zach Brooks	3,192	48.4%			
2018 General	Patti Anne Lodge (incumbent)	13,834	77.8%	Edward Savala	3,949	22.2%			
2020 Primary	Patti Anne Lodge (incumbent)	3,694	44.9%	Zach Brooks	2,916	35.4%	Scott Brock	1,622	19.7%
2020 General	Patti Anne Lodge (incumbent)	20,631	100%						

== Committees ==
Lodge serves on the following committees:

- Health and Welfare
- Judiciary and Rules
- Millennium Fund (co-chair)
- State Affairs (chair)

== Organizations ==
Outside of her legislative duties, Lodge has the following positions:

- Advisory Board of Boise State University since 2002
- State Finance Chair of Idaho Republican Party since 2001
- Member of Idaho Catholic Foundation since 1992

== Personal life ==
She is married to Edward Lodge, a United States federal judge for the United States District Court for the District of Idaho and is a mother to three children.
