= Helen Young =

Helen Young may refer to:

- Helen Young (weather forecaster) (born 1969), English weather forecaster and presenter
- Helen Young (radio manager) (1926–2019), New Zealand radio manager and advocate for New Zealand music performers and composers
- Helen Young (lawyer) (1862–1951), first female admitted to practice law in Ohio
- Helen Binkerd Young (1877–1959), New York architect
- Helen Young Hayes (born 1962), an American investment fund manager

== See also ==
- Helene Young, an Australian author of romantic suspense novels
- Helen Mason Young (1938–1989), a British journalist and children's author, known as Helen Mason
- Mary Helen Young (1883–1945), a Scottish nurse and resistance fighter who helped British servicemen escape from Nazi-occupied France during World War II
- Ellen Young (disambiguation)
