= Molly Huskey =

American judge

Judge of the Idaho Court of Appeals
- Incumbent
- Assumed office July 2015
- Appointed by: Butch Otter

Personal details
- Education: University of Idaho (BA, JD); Duke University (LLM)

Molly Jeanne Huskey is an American lawyer and jurist serving as a judge of the Idaho Court of Appeals. Appointed by Governor Butch Otter, she assumed her role in July 2015.

== Education ==
Huskey graduated from Moscow High School in 1984. She earned a Bachelor of Arts degree in public relations from the University of Idaho in 1989 and a Juris Doctor from the University of Idaho College of Law in 1993. In 2020, she earned a Master of Laws in judicial studies from the Duke University School of Law. During her time at Duke, Huskey's roommate was Judge Susan Oki Mollway.

== Career ==
Prior to her appointment as a judge, Huskey served as a public defender and prosecutor in Bonneville County, Idaho. In 1998, she joined the Office of the Idaho Appellate Public Defender. She was appointed to serve as the state appellate public defender by Governor Dirk Kempthorne in 2002.
