= Louise Young =

Louise Young may refer to:

- Louise Young (historian), historian of modern Japanese history
- Louise Nichols Young (1862–1951), first female admitted to practice law in the state of Idaho
- Louise Young, former owner of The Grove
- Louise Young, a character on Misfits
- Louise Young, astronomer who collaborated with James Whitney Young in 1969 on hypersensitization
- Louise Young, camogie player for Tipperary, see 2006 All-Ireland Senior Camogie Championship
- N. Louise Young (1907–1997), first African-American woman physician in the state of Maryland
