= Frank Sigel Dietrich =

American judge (1863–1930)

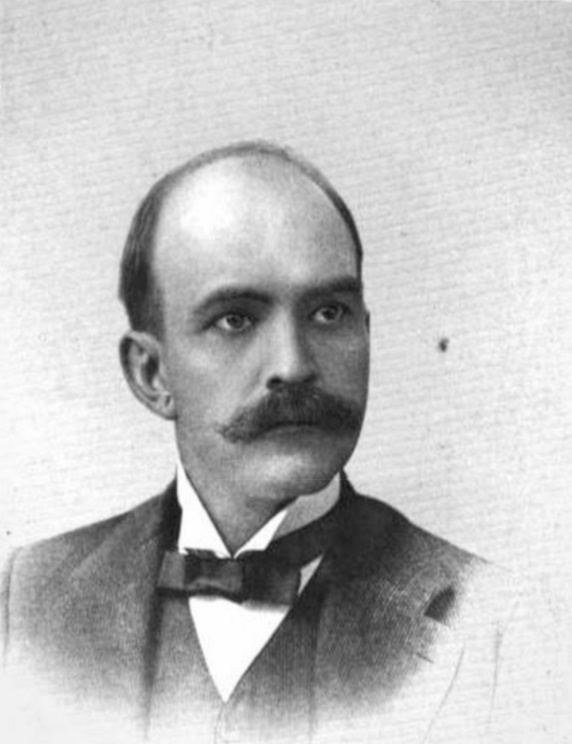

Judge of the United States Court of Appeals for the Ninth Circuit
- In office January 3, 1927 – October 2, 1930
- Appointed by: Calvin Coolidge
- Preceded by: Wallace McCamant
- Succeeded by: William Henry Sawtelle

Judge of the United States District Court for the District of Idaho
- In office March 19, 1907 – January 18, 1927
- Appointed by: Theodore Roosevelt
- Preceded by: James H. Beatty
- Succeeded by: Charles Cheatham Cavanah

Personal details
- Born: Frank Sigel Dietrich; January 23, 1863 Ottawa, Kansas, U.S.
- Died: October 2, 1930 (aged 67) Boise, Idaho, U.S.
- Resting place: Morris Hill Cemetery; Boise, Idaho
- Education: Brown University (AB, AM) read law

Frank Sigel Dietrich (January 23, 1863 – October 2, 1930) was a United States circuit judge of the United States Court of Appeals for the Ninth Circuit and previously was a United States district judge of the United States District Court for the District of Idaho.

== Education and career ==
Dietrich was born near Ottawa, Franklin County, Kansas in 1863, at the Dietrich Cabin. His parents had immigrated to the United States from the German Confederation (now Germany) in 1855, and his father, Jacob Dietrich, became a farmer. Jacob Dietrich died less than one year after the birth of his son Frank, whose name was chosen to honor American Civil War general Franz Sigel. Dietrich received an Artium Baccalaureus degree from Brown University in 1887 and an Artium Magister degree from that institution in 1890. He taught Latin, history, and political science at Ottawa University in Kansas, and read law to enter the bar in 1891, and was an attorney for the Union Pacific Railroad from 1899 to 1907.

== Federal judicial service ==
Dietrich received a recess appointment from President Theodore Roosevelt on March 19, 1907, to a seat on the United States District Court for the District of Idaho vacated by Judge James H. Beatty. He was nominated to the same position by President Roosevelt on December 3, 1907. He was confirmed by the United States Senate on December 17, 1907, and received his commission the same day. His service terminated on January 18, 1927, due to his elevation to the Ninth Circuit.

Dietrich was nominated by President Calvin Coolidge on December 22, 1926, to a seat on the United States Court of Appeals for the Ninth Circuit vacated by Judge Wallace McCamant. He was confirmed by the Senate on January 3, 1927, and received his commission the same day. His service terminated on October 2, 1930, due to his death of a heart attack in Boise, Idaho. Dietrich and his wife Martha (1873–1958) are buried at Morris Hill Cemetery in Boise.

== Honor ==
The town of Dietrich in rural Lincoln County, Idaho was named after him shortly after he became a federal judge.

Legal offices
Preceded by James H. Beatty	Judge of the United States District Court for the District of Idaho; 1907–1927	Succeeded by Charles Cheatham Cavanah
Preceded by Wallace McCamant	Judge of the United States Court of Appeals for the Ninth Circuit; 1927–1930	Succeeded by William Henry Sawtelle
