= Ellen Young =

Ellen Young may refer to:

- Ellen Young (poet) (1810–1872), Australian poet, feminist, fighting for the rights of women and bringing attention to the lifestyle via poems
- Ellen Young (politician) (born 1952), American politician, representative in the New York State Assembly

== See also ==
- Martha Ellen Young Truman (1852–1947), the mother of U.S. president Harry Truman
- Helen Young (disambiguation)
