= Edward Lodge =

American judge (born 1933)

Edward J. Lodge
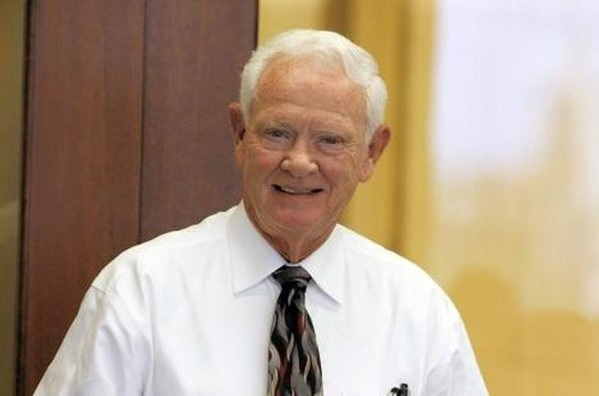
- circa 2014

Senior Judge of the United States District Court for the District of Idaho
- Incumbent
- Assumed office July 3, 2015

Chief Judge of the United States District Court for the District of Idaho
- In office 1992–1999
- Preceded by: Harold L. Ryan
- Succeeded by: B. Lynn Winmill

Judge of the United States District Court for the District of Idaho
- In office November 27, 1989 – July 3, 2015
- Appointed by: George H. W. Bush
- Preceded by: Marion Callister
- Succeeded by: David Nye

Bankruptcy Judge of the United States District Court for the District of Idaho
- In office January 7, 1988 – November 27, 1989

Judge of the Third Judicial District of Idaho
- In office January 20, 1965 – January 6, 1988
- Appointed by: Robert E. Smylie

Judge of the Canyon County Probate Court
- In office June 1963 – January 19, 1965

Personal details
- Born: Edward James Lodge; December 3, 1933 (age 92) Caldwell, Idaho
- Spouse: Patti Anne Lodge
- Education: Boise Junior College (AA); College of Idaho (BA); University of Idaho College of Law (LLB)

Edward James Lodge (born December 3, 1933) is an American jurist who is an inactive senior United States district judge of the United States District Court for the District of Idaho in Boise, Idaho.

== Education ==
Born in Caldwell, Idaho, Lodge graduated from Caldwell High School and briefly attended the University of Notre Dame in South Bend, Indiana. He was a two-time junior college All-American quarterback at Boise Junior College in 1953 and 1954.

Lodge earned his Bachelor of Arts degree from the College of Idaho in Caldwell in 1957, and graduated from the University of Idaho's College of Law in Moscow with a Bachelor of Laws in 1961.

== Early career ==
Following law school, Lodge practiced law in Idaho from 1962 to 1963. He began his long judicial career in 1963 as a Probate Judge in Canyon County, and in 1965 became the youngest ever appointed to a district court in Idaho, at age 31.

Lodge served for nearly a quarter century as a district judge for the state's Third District in Canyon County, and presided at the double-murder trial of mountainman Claude Dallas in 1982, a case which received national notoriety. He was later appointed as a U.S. Bankruptcy Judge for the District of Idaho from 1988 to 1989.

== Federal judicial service ==
When Judge Marion Jones Callister of the U.S. District Court in Boise took senior status in 1989, Lodge was recommended by Senator James A. McClure to fill the seat. President George H. W. Bush nominated Lodge on October 30, 1989; he was confirmed by a unanimous consent by the Senate on November 21, 1989, and received his commission on November 27, 1989.

He served a term as chief judge for the District of Idaho from 1992 to 1999, and was succeeded as chief judge by B. Lynn Winmill. Lodge assumed senior status on July 3, 2015.

=== Notable cases ===
==== Ruby Ridge ====
In the spring of 1993, Lodge was the presiding judge in the trial of Randy Weaver and Kevin Harris, defendants in the previous August's Ruby Ridge standoff in northern Idaho.

Five years later in 1998, Lodge was also the presiding judge in the case of Idaho v. Lon T. Horiuchi, which involved the indictment of the FBI sniper who shot three people at Ruby Ridge, killing one. Lodge cited the Supremacy Clause of the U.S. Constitution and dismissed the charges against Horiuchi, which angered many who felt the leniency was unmerited. It was narrowly overturned on appeal (6–5) by the Ninth Circuit in 2001, but the Boundary County prosecutor opted not to pursue the charges brought by his predecessor in 1997.

==== Sami Al-Hussayen ====
In 2004, Lodge presided over the trial of Sami Omar Al-Hussayen—accused of recruiting Islamic fanatics into participating in Jihad against the United States. On May 13, he ruled to disallow a defense witness to refer to a blood drive that Hussayen had run after September 11th to help the victims, nor that he had widely condemned the attacks.

==== Sackett v. EPA ====
In 2019, Lodge ruled that the Sacketts' property included wetlands that were protected by the Clean Water Act. The 9th circuit affirmed Lodge's ruling in 2021, but the 9th circuit was reversed by the Supreme Court in Sackett v. Environmental Protection Agency (2023), which held that only wetlands with a "continuous surface connection" to waters of the United States were protected by the Clean Water Act.

== Personal ==
Lodge was the target of a foiled murder plot in 1998. He is married to Patti Anne Lodge, a state senator from Huston in Canyon County. He is the president of the Caldwell Night Rodeo.

Legal offices
Preceded by Marion Jones Callister	Judge of the United States District Court for the District of Idaho; 1989–2015	Succeeded by David Nye
Preceded by Harold L. Ryan	Chief Judge of the United States District Court for the District of Idaho; 1992–1999	Succeeded by B. Lynn Winmill
