= 2006 Idaho Amendment 2 =

Amendment 2
- November 7, 2006
- Idaho Marriage Definition Amendment

Results
Choice	Votes	%
Yes	282,386	63.35%
No	163,384	36.65%
Valid votes	445,770	97.13%
Invalid or blank votes	13,157	2.87%
Total votes	458,927	100.00%
Registered voters/turnout	764,880	58.27%
- Yes: 50–60% 60–70% 70–80% 80–90% 90%+ No: 50–60% 60–70% 70–80% 80–90% 90%+ Tie: 50%

Idaho Amendment 2 of 2006 is an amendment to the Idaho Constitution that made it unconstitutional for the state to recognize or perform same-sex marriages or civil unions.

The text of the amendment states:

A marriage between a man and a woman is the only domestic legal union that shall be valid or recognized in this state.

The amendment was passed 53–17 by the Idaho House of Representatives on February 6, 2006, and 26–9 by the Idaho Senate on February 15, 2006. It was subsequently approved by 63% of voters in a referendum.

On May 13, 2014, a United States magistrate judge struck down Amendment 2 as unconstitutional, but enforcement of that ruling was stayed pending appeal. The Ninth Circuit Court of Appeals affirmed that ruling on October 7, 2014, though the U.S. Supreme Court issued a stay of the ruling, which was not lifted until October 15, 2014.

On June 26, 2015, the United States Supreme Court ruled in Obergefell v. Hodges that state bans on same-sex marriage violated the 14th Amendment's guarantees of Equal Protection and Due Process, making same-sex marriage permanently legal in Idaho.

== Result ==
Option	Votes	
Option	Num.	%
Yes	282,386	63.35
No	163,384	36.65
Total	445,770	100.00
Source: Idaho Secretary of State

=== Results by county ===
County	Yes	Yes %	No	No %
Ada	62,215	51.62%	58,311	48.38%
Adams	1,066	63.53%	612	36.47%
Bannock	15,580	63.26%	9,050	36.74%
Bear Lake	1,865	83.97%	356	16.03%
Benewah	1,891	66.73%	943	33.27%
Bingham	9,669	76.19%	3,021	23.81%
Blaine	2,426	33.69%	4,775	66.31%
Boise	1,759	61.25%	1,113	38.75%
Bonner	8,272	60.52%	5,397	39.48%
Bonneville	21,235	69.84%	9,172	30.16%
Boundary	2,204	69.72%	957	30.28%
Butte	797	72.65%	300	27.35%
Camas	294	66.22%	150	33.78%
Canyon	29,672	70.09%	12,665	29.91%
Caribou	1,719	69.18%	766	30.82%
Cassia	4,494	79.12%	1,186	20.88%
Clark	245	75.85%	78	24.15%
Clearwater	1,941	66.07%	997	33.93%
Custer	1,197	64.39%	662	35.61%
Elmore	3,651	65.94%	1,886	34.06%
Franklin	3,357	85.18%	584	14.82%
Fremont	3,369	77.88%	957	22.12%
Gem	3,923	70.02%	1,680	29.98%
Gooding	2,836	70.08%	1,211	29.92%
Idaho	4,463	70.56%	1,862	29.44%
Jefferson	5,877	80.11%	1,459	19.89%
Jerome	3,362	70.48%	1,408	29.52%
Kootenai	24,816	67.20%	12,114	32.80%
Latah	5,412	44.95%	6,629	55.05%
Lemhi	2,116	68.72%	963	31.28%
Lewis	985	70.66%	409	29.34%
Lincoln	949	66.88%	470	33.12%
Madison	7,081	89.07%	869	10.93%
Minidoka	3,828	75.37%	1,251	24.63%
Nez Perce	7,229	60.48%	4,723	39.52%
Oneida	1,231	83.63%	241	16.37%
Owyhee	2,048	73.75%	729	26.25%
Payette	4,145	72.21%	1,595	27.79%
Power	1,473	69.88%	635	30.12%
Shoshone	2,423	65.42%	1,281	34.58%
Teton	1,624	54.13%	1,376	45.87%
Twin Falls	13,258	69.65%	5,778	30.35%
Valley	2,023	53.46%	1,761	46.54%
Washington	2,366	70.25%	1,002	29.75%

Source: Idaho Secretary of State

== See also ==
- LGBTQ rights in Idaho
