= Ryan D. Nelson =

American judge (born 1973)

Ryan Nelson

Judge of the United States Court of Appeals for the Ninth Circuit
- Incumbent
- Assumed office October 18, 2018
- Appointed by: Donald Trump
- Preceded by: N. Randy Smith

Personal details
- Born: Ryan Douglas Nelson; June 23, 1973 (age 53) Idaho Falls, Idaho, U.S.
- Education: Brigham Young University (BA, JD)

Ryan Douglas Nelson (born June 23, 1973) is a judge on the United States Court of Appeals for the Ninth Circuit. He was previously nominated to become solicitor of the United States Department of the Interior, but was never confirmed.

== Early life and education ==
Nelson earned a BA in English literature from Brigham Young University (BYU) in 1996. He then attended BYU's J. Reuben Clark Law School, where he was lead articles editor of the BYU Law Review. During law school, he was a clerk for then–Senate legal counsel Thomas B. Griffith during the impeachment of President Bill Clinton in 1999, assisting with preparation for Clinton's trial in the Senate. He graduated with his JD that same year.

== Legal career ==
After law school, Nelson clerked for Judge Karen L. Henderson of the United States Court of Appeals for the District of Columbia Circuit and for Richard M. Mosk and Charles N. Brower of the Iran–United States Claims Tribunal in The Hague, Netherlands. Nelson then worked as an associate at Sidley Austin, where he argued thirteen federal court of appeals cases on environmental and constitutional issues before becoming a judge.

From 2006 to 2008, Nelson served as a deputy assistant attorney general in the Environment and Natural Resources Division of the United States Department of Justice and served as deputy general counsel for the Office of Management and Budget from 2008 to 2009. He has also served as special counsel on the Senate Judiciary Committee.

From 2009 to 2018, Nelson was general counsel of Melaleuca, Inc. In July 2017, he was nominated to be solicitor of the United States Department of the Interior. In September 2017, Nelson appeared before the Committee on Energy and Natural Resources. His nomination was then placed on the Senate executive calendar, but was never confirmed by the full Senate.

== Federal judicial service ==
On May 10, 2018, President Donald Trump withdrew Nelson's nomination to be solicitor of the Department of the Interior and announced his intent to instead nominate him to serve as a judge on the United States Court of Appeals for the Ninth Circuit. On May 15, 2018, his nomination was sent to the Senate. Nelson was nominated to the seat vacated by Judge N. Randy Smith, who subsequently assumed senior status on August 11, 2018. On July 11, 2018, a hearing on his nomination was held before the Senate Judiciary Committee. On September 13, 2018, his nomination was reported out of committee by an 11–10 vote. On October 11, 2018, the United States Senate confirmed his nomination by a 51–44 vote. He received his judicial commission on October 18, 2018.

In 2025, amid deployments of National Guard into cities across the United States by the second Trump administration, Nelson questioned whether the judiciary could restrain the president from deploying the National Guard in this manner.

== Memberships ==
Nelson has been a member of the Federalist Society since 1997. He has served as a council member and co-chair of the General Counsel Committee for the American Bar Association Administrative Law and Regulatory Practice since 2012. Nelson has been a member of the Idaho Chapter of the Federal Bar Association and the Eagle Rock Inns of Court since 2010. He was a member of the Republican National Lawyers Association from 2005 until 2018.

== Personal life ==
Nelson was born and raised in Idaho Falls, Idaho. Nelson is married to Barbara Baer and they have seven children.

In April 2026, Nelson was charged with misdemeanor battery and malicious injury to property in Idaho state court following a confrontation in a parking lot during which Nelson allegedly grabbed eyeglasses off a man's face and stomped on them during a dispute over a parking space. Two judicial misconduct complaints were filed in response, one by Mary Murguia, chief judge of the Ninth ‌Circuit Court of Appeals, and another by Fix the Court, a court reform advocacy group.

Legal offices
Preceded by N. Randy Smith	Judge of the United States Court of Appeals for the Ninth Circuit; 2018–present	Incumbent
