= C. C. Cavanah House =

Historic building in Boise, Idaho

- U.S. National Register of Historic Places
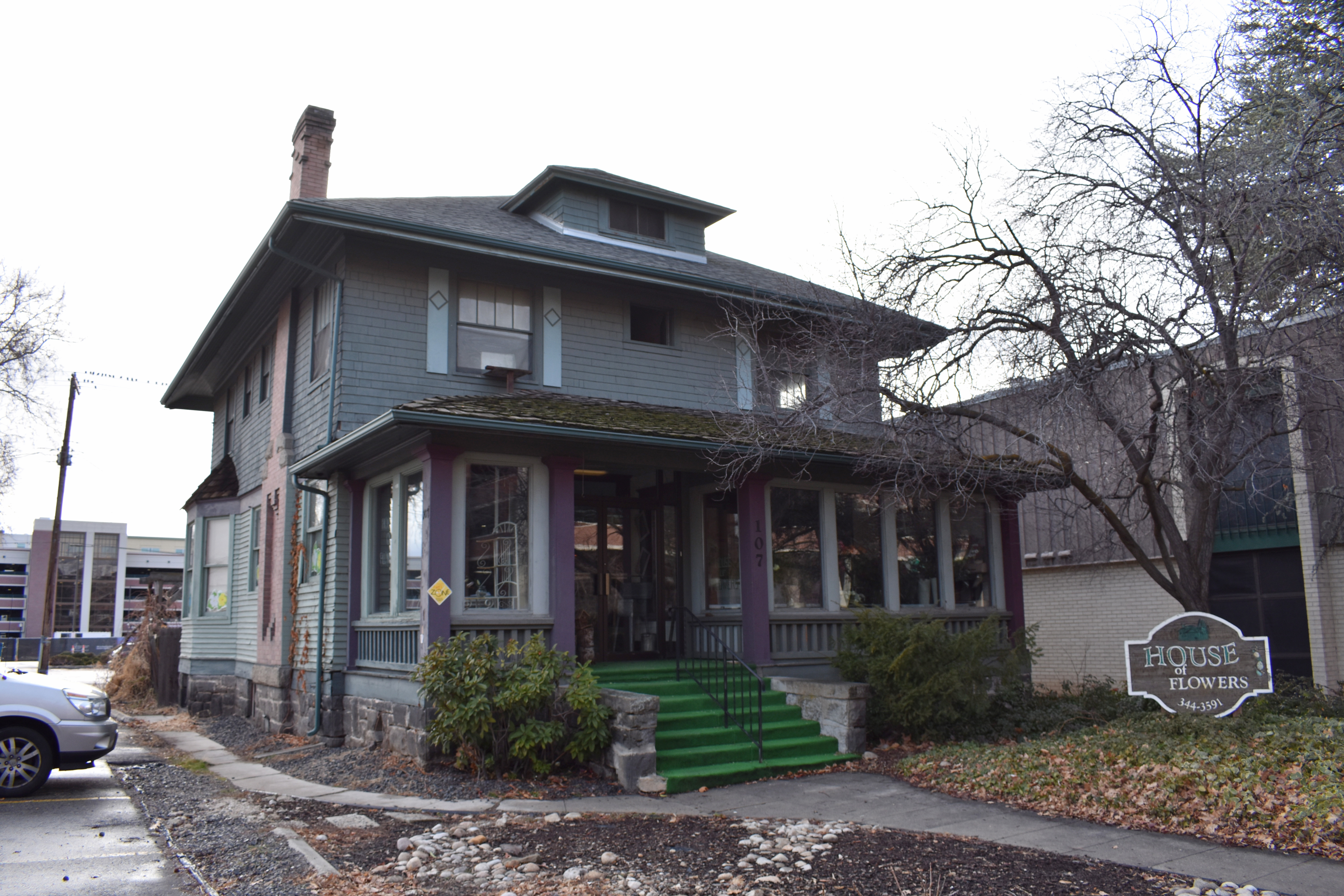
- The C.C. Cavanah House in 2019

- Location within Idaho Location within the United States
- Location: 107 E. Idaho St., Boise, Idaho
- Coordinates: 43°36′43″N 116°11′36″W
- Area: less than one acre
- Built: 1906
- Built by: W.D. Stevens
- Architect: Toutellotte, John E. & Company
- Architectural style: Colonial Revival
- MPS: Tourtellotte and Hummel Architecture TR
- NRHP reference No.: 82000185
- Added to NRHP: November 17, 1982

The C.C. Cavanah House in Boise, Idaho, is a 2-story Colonial Revival structure designed by Tourtellotte & Co. and built by W.D. Stevens in 1906 for Charles Cavanah. The house was added to the National Register of Historic Places (NRHP) in 1982.

The original design featured eight rooms, including four bedrooms, and a "broad porch" that was divided and enclosed sometime after construction. Tourtellotte & Co. intended an exterior of brick veneer with stone trimmings, but the NRHP nomination form described an exterior of clapboard siding below square shingles.

Charles Cavanah served as Boise City Attorney, and in 1906 he was elected to represent Ada County in the Idaho State Legislature. Later he was appointed a federal district judge. In 1925 Charles F. Hummel designed a more stately house for Cavanah, the Charles C. Cavanah house (1925), also known as the Angell house, now part of the Warm Springs Avenue Historic District.

== See also ==
- National Register of Historic Places listings in Ada County, Idaho
