= Ida Leggett =

American judge

Ida Leggett is Idaho’s first African American female lawyer and judge.

Leggett was born in a small Alabama town where her father worked at a sawmill and her mother as an educator. The Jim Crow laws were still prevalent during Leggett's youth, and she attended the Tuskegee University after graduating from her segregated high school. She dropped out a year later and decided to marry and raise a family. By the time she continued her higher education, Leggett was a single mother to three children. She graduated from the University of South Florida in Tampa, Florida and earned her J.D. degree at Gonzaga University School of Law in Spokane, Washington. It was during her time in Washington that Leggett worked for the U.S. Attorney's Office and clerked for a Washington Supreme Court Justice.

In 1986, Leggett became the first African American female admitted to practice law in Idaho. Despite encountering racial discrimination, she set up a law practice in Coeur d’Alene. In 1992, she became the first African American female to become a judge upon her appointment to the Second District Court in Lewiston, Idaho. Prior to her judgeship, Leggett served as a member of the Idaho Commission of Pardons and Parole. She resigned from the bench in 1998 in order to relocate closer to her children in Seattle and lead a more serene life.

== See also ==
- List of first women lawyers and judges in Idaho
