= Charles Cheatham Cavanah =

American judge

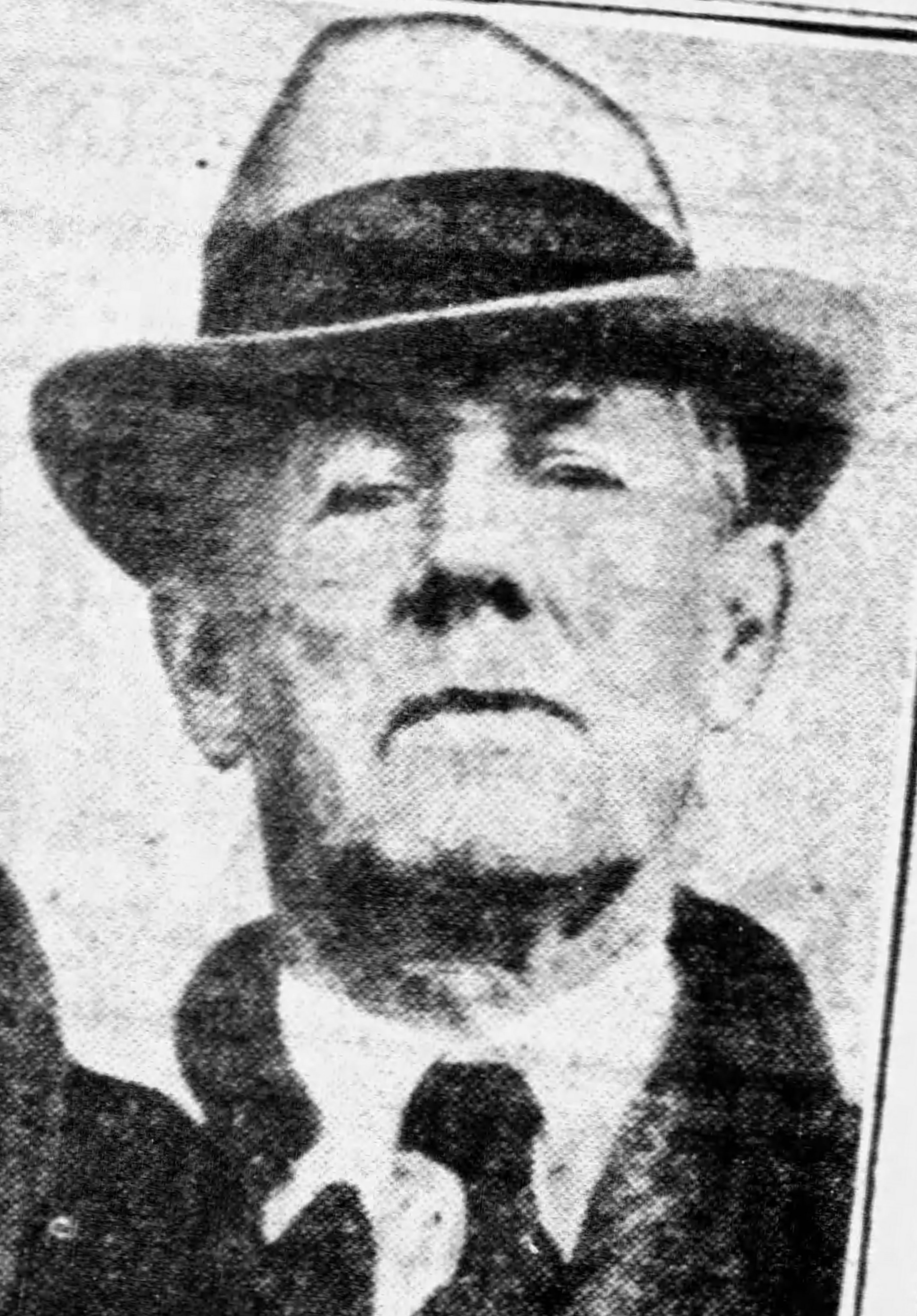

Senior Judge of the United States District Court for the District of Idaho
- In office January 3, 1942 – June 30, 1953

Judge of the United States District Court for the District of Idaho
- In office January 3, 1927 – January 3, 1942
- Appointed by: Calvin Coolidge
- Preceded by: Frank Sigel Dietrich
- Succeeded by: Chase A. Clark

Personal details
- Born: Charles Cheatham Cavanah; September 26, 1871 Greensboro, North Carolina, US
- Died: June 30, 1953 (aged 81) Boise, Idaho, US
- Resting place: Morris Hill Cemetery, Boise
- Education: read law

Charles Cheatham Cavanah (September 26, 1871 – June 30, 1953) was a United States district judge of the United States District Court for the District of Idaho.

== Education and career ==
Cavanah was born on September 26, 1871, in Greensboro, North Carolina, to parents Frank and Larue (Cheatham) Cavanah. Frank Cavanah traveled to Idaho Territory that year to pursue mining interests in Rocky Bar and Hailey, and he remained in Idaho until his death in 1897. Larue Cavanah died in 1872, leaving the infant Charles in the care of family members. Cavanah attended public schools in North Carolina and in Texas, where he also worked as a store clerk. In 1892, he moved to Boise, Idaho, and became court crier of the Idaho Supreme Court. Cavanah read law in the office of William Borah, and he lived at the home of Judge Joseph W. Houston. After admission to the bar in 1895, Cavanah joined the partnership of Borah, Cavanah & Blake. Later, Cavanah became senior partner in Cavanah, Blake & McLane. In 1897, Cavanah was elected Boise city attorney, and in 1906 he was elected to represent Ada County, Idaho in the Idaho State Legislature.

== Federal judicial service ==
Cavanah was nominated by President Calvin Coolidge on December 22, 1926, to a seat on the United States District Court for the District of Idaho vacated by Judge Frank Sigel Dietrich. He was confirmed by the United States Senate on January 3, 1927, and received his commission the same day. He assumed senior status on January 3, 1942. His service terminated on June 30, 1953, due to his death in Boise. He was married to Mildred Benzel Cavanah.

== See also ==
- C. C. Cavanah House

Legal offices
Preceded by Frank Sigel Dietrich	Judge of the United States District Court for the District of Idaho; 1927–1942	Succeeded by Chase A. Clark
