= Harold L. Ryan =

American judge

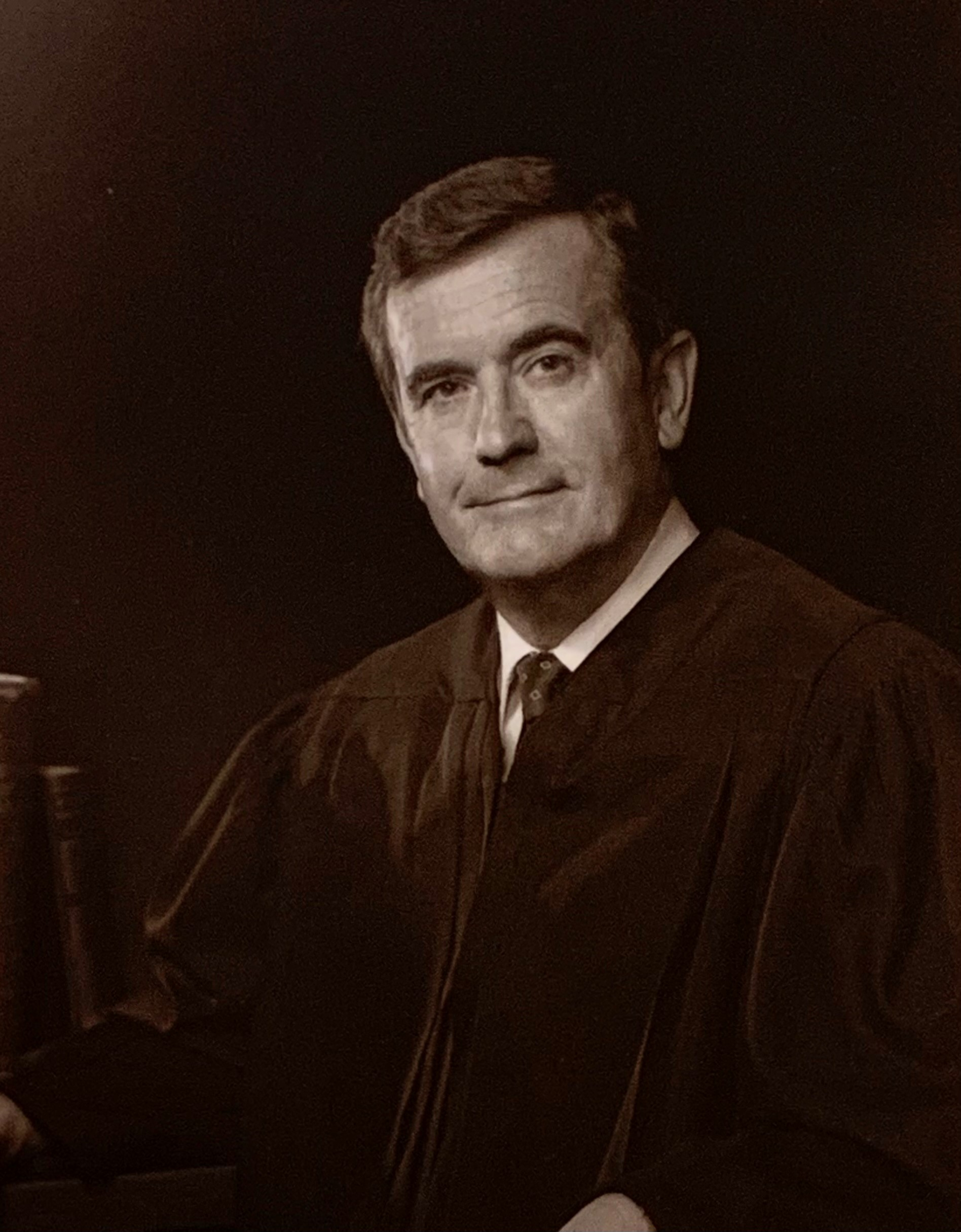
- Ryan in 1981

Senior Judge of the United States District Court for the District of Idaho
- In office December 30, 1992 – April 10, 1995

Chief Judge of the United States District Court for the District of Idaho
- In office 1988–1992
- Preceded by: Marion Callister
- Succeeded by: Edward Lodge

Judge of the United States District Court for the District of Idaho
- In office December 17, 1981 – December 30, 1992
- Appointed by: Ronald Reagan
- Preceded by: Raymond McNichols
- Succeeded by: B. Lynn Winmill

Personal details
- Born: Harold Lyman Ryan; June 17, 1923 Weiser, Idaho
- Died: April 10, 1995 (aged 71) Boise, Idaho
- Resting place: Morris Hill Cemetery; Boise, Idaho
- Party: Republican
- Spouse: Ann (Dagres) Ryan (b.1926, m.1961)
- Children: 3 sons
- Education: University of Idaho; College of Law (LL.B., 1950)

Military service
- Allegiance: United States
- Branch/service: U.S. Navy
- Years of service: 1943–1946
- Rank: Ensign
- Unit: USS Merrick
- Battles/wars: World War II (Pacific Theater)

Harold Lyman Ryan (June 17, 1923 – April 10, 1995) was an attorney and United States district judge of the United States District Court for the District of Idaho.

== Education ==
Born and raised in Weiser, Idaho, Ryan graduated from Weiser High School in 1941, and attended the University of Idaho in Moscow from 1941 to 1943, then enlisted in the U.S. Navy.

He attended the University of Washington in Seattle under the V-12 Navy College Training Program, completed midshipmen's school at the University of Notre Dame in South Bend, Indiana, and graduated with a commission as an ensign in 1944. Ryan served the remainder of World War II in the Pacific Theater aboard the USS Merrick.

Ryan returned to the University of Idaho in 1946, and entered its College of Law, graduating in January 1950 with a Bachelor of Laws.

== Early career ==
Ryan was admitted to the Idaho State Bar in 1950, and returned to Weiser to practice law with his father, Frank D. Ryan. He served as a deputy prosecutor of Washington County from 1951 to 1952, and was elected to the Idaho state senate in 1962 and served from 1963 to 1966.

While in the state senate, Ryan took a particular interest in modernizing the Idaho judiciary and served as Chairman of the Joint Commission of the Idaho Legislature which instituted sweeping reform by reorganizing and modernizing the state judicial system, creating a court administration, and forming the Idaho Judicial Council. He also served as president of the Idaho state bar from 1967 to 1969.

== Federal judicial service ==
After serving as campaign director for Senator Jim McClure in 1978, McClure recommended Ryan to President Ronald Reagan in July 1981 to fill a seat on the U.S. District Court vacated by Judge Raymond McNichols. He was nominated by President Reagan on December 7, confirmed by the Senate on December 16, and received commission on December 17, 1981.

Ryan served as Chief Judge from 1988 to 1992, then assumed senior status on December 30, 1992, and continued until his death from cancer on April 10, 1995. He is buried at Morris Hill Cemetery in Boise.

=== Notable cases ===
- In the spring of 1982, recaptured fugitive spy Christopher Boyce was sentenced by Ryan to three years for his escape and to 25 years for bank robbery, conspiracy, and breaking federal gun laws.
- In the mid-1980s, Ryan ruled in favor of inmate Walter "Bud" Balla and others that conditions in the state prison violated their constitutional rights. He imposed a cap on inmate population which necessitated the construction of a new maximum security facility.
- In early 1991, Ryan issued the bench warrant for Randy Weaver, which led to the Ruby Ridge standoff in August 1992.

Legal offices
Preceded by Raymond Clyne McNichols	Judge of the United States District Court for the District of Idaho; 1981–1992	Succeeded by B. Lynn Winmill
Preceded by Marion Jones Callister	Chief Judge of the United States District Court for the District of Idaho; 1988–1992	Succeeded by Edward Lodge
