= David Nye (judge) =

American judge (born 1958)

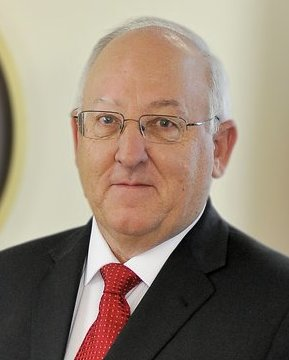
- Nye in September 2017

Chief Judge of the United States District Court for the District of Idaho
- In office January 2, 2019 – January 2, 2026
- Preceded by: B. Lynn Winmill
- Succeeded by: Amanda Brailsford

Judge of the United States District Court for the District of Idaho
- Incumbent
- Assumed office July 12, 2017
- Appointed by: Donald Trump
- Preceded by: Edward Lodge

Personal details
- Born: David Charles Nye; 1958 (age 67–68) Lynwood, California, U.S.
- Education: Brigham Young University (BA, JD)

David Charles Nye (born 1958) is an American lawyer and jurist who is a United States district judge of the United States District Court for the District of Idaho. He was a state court judge for Idaho's Sixth District Court from 2007 to 2017, and before that spent twenty years in private practice in Idaho.

== Early life and education ==
Nye was born in 1958 in Lynwood, California. He graduated from Brigham Young University (BYU) in 1982 with a Bachelor of Arts in English literature. He worked for Swire's Coca-Cola bottling plant in Salt Lake City, then attended BYU's J. Reuben Clark Law School, graduating in 1986 with a Juris Doctor degree.

== Career ==
Nye began his legal career in 1986 in Burley, Idaho as a law clerk to Judge George G. Granata of the state's Fifth District Court. The following year, he joined the law firm of Merrill & Merrill in Pocatello as an associate. He became a partner in 1989, specialized in medical malpractice and insurance law, and stayed with the firm until 2007.

Nye served a judge in the Sixth Judicial District from June 6, 2007 to July 12, 2017, preceded by and succeeded N. Randy Smithby Rick Carnaroli.

== Federal judicial service ==
=== Expired nomination under Obama ===
On the recommendation of U.S. Senators Mike Crapo and Jim Risch, President Barack Obama nominated Nye on April 5, 2016, to serve as a judge of the U.S. District Court for the District of Idaho. Nye was nominated to the seat vacated by Judge Edward Lodge, who assumed senior status on July 3, 2015.

The Senate Judiciary Committee held a hearing on his nomination on June 21, 2016, and his nomination was reported out of committee by voice vote on July 14. The nomination expired on January 3, 2017, with the end of the 114th Congress.

Shortly after the 2016 election, Senators Crapo and Risch indicated that if Nye was not confirmed by year's end, they would recommend him to incoming President Donald Trump for renomination in the 115th Congress.

=== Renomination under Trump ===
On April 27, 2017, Senators Crapo and Risch indicated that President Trump would renominate Nye to the same seat, and his renomination was announced on May 8, 2017. Nye was unanimously rated as "well qualified" by the American Bar Association, as he had been from his previous nomination in 2016. On June 15, 2017, his nomination was reported out of committee by a voice vote. On July 10, 2017, the Senate invoked cloture on his nomination by a 97–0 vote. On July 12, 2017, his nomination was confirmed by a 100–0 vote. Nye received his commission the same day. He was sworn in on August 1, 2017 in a private ceremony. He became chief judge on January 2, 2019, succeeding B. Lynn Winmill, serving in that capacity until January 2, 2026.

== See also ==
- Barack Obama judicial appointment controversies

Legal offices
Preceded by Edward Lodge	Judge of the United States District Court for the District of Idaho; 2017–present	Incumbent
Preceded by B. Lynn Winmill	Chief Judge of the United States District Court for the District of Idaho; 2019–2026	Succeeded by Amanda Brailsford
