= Trenton, Utah =

- Town
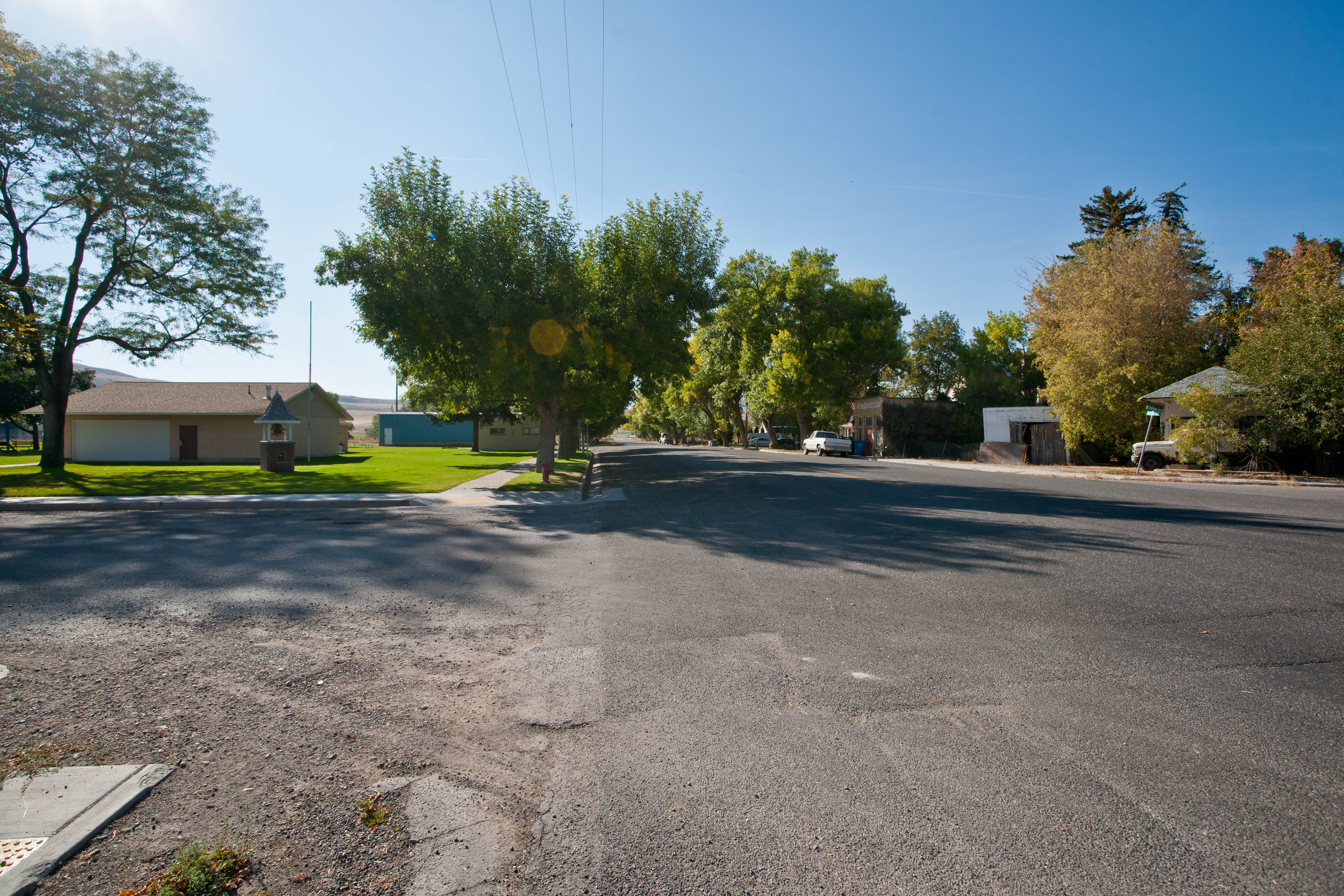
- Looking south across Main Street (Utah State Route 142) and along Center Street in Trenton, September 2012

- Location in Cache County and the state of Utah.
- Coordinates: 41°54′41″N 111°56′08″W
- Country: United States
- State: Utah
- County: Cache
- Settled: 1870
- Named for: Trenton, New Jersey

Area
  - Total: 8.29 sq mi (21.47 km^{2})
  - Land: 8.21 sq mi (21.26 km^{2})
  - Water: 0.081 sq mi (0.21 km^{2})
- Elevation: 4,459 ft (1,359 m)

Population (2020)
  - Total: 512
  - Estimate (2019): 552
  - Density: 67.3/sq mi (25.97/km^{2})
- Time zone: UTC-7 (Mountain (MST))
  - Summer (DST): UTC-6 (MDT)
- ZIP code: 84338
- Area code: 435
- FIPS code: 49-77230
- GNIS feature ID: 2413399
- Website: trenton-ut.gov

Trenton is a town in Cache County, Utah, United States. The population was 512 at the 2020 census. It is included in the Logan, Utah-Idaho (partial) Metropolitan Statistical Area.

== Geography ==
According to the United States Census Bureau, the town has a total area of 7.3 square miles (19.0 km^{2}), of which 7.2 square miles (18.8 km^{2}) is land and 0.1 square mile (0.2 km^{2}) (1.23%) is water.

=== Climate ===
This climatic region is typified by large seasonal temperature differences, with warm to hot summers and cold (sometimes severely cold) winters. According to the Köppen Climate Classification system, Trenton has a humid continental climate, abbreviated "Dsb" on climate maps.

Climate data for Trenton, Utah, (1991–2020 normals, extremes 1944–1948 and 1976–present)
Month	Jan	Feb	Mar	Apr	May	Jun	Jul	Aug	Sep	Oct	Nov	Dec	Year
Record high °F (°C)	60 (16)	64 (18)	76 (24)	85 (29)	94 (34)	100 (38)	103 (39)	102 (39)	99 (37)	87 (31)	74 (23)	62 (17)	103 (39)
Mean maximum °F (°C)	46.6 (8.1)	50.9 (10.5)	66.7 (19.3)	77.2 (25.1)	85.0 (29.4)	92.2 (33.4)	97.1 (36.2)	96.6 (35.9)	90.3 (32.4)	79.2 (26.2)	63.5 (17.5)	51.1 (10.6)	98.1 (36.7)
Mean daily maximum °F (°C)	31.7 (−0.2)	37.0 (2.8)	49.9 (9.9)	59.1 (15.1)	68.9 (20.5)	79.3 (26.3)	88.8 (31.6)	87.6 (30.9)	77.2 (25.1)	62.7 (17.1)	47.1 (8.4)	33.8 (1.0)	60.3 (15.7)
Daily mean °F (°C)	21.9 (−5.6)	26.8 (−2.9)	37.7 (3.2)	45.4 (7.4)	53.9 (12.2)	62.3 (16.8)	70.1 (21.2)	68.1 (20.1)	58.5 (14.7)	46.6 (8.1)	34.8 (1.6)	24.1 (−4.4)	45.9 (7.7)
Mean daily minimum °F (°C)	12.1 (−11.1)	16.7 (−8.5)	25.6 (−3.6)	31.7 (−0.2)	39.0 (3.9)	45.3 (7.4)	51.4 (10.8)	48.6 (9.2)	39.8 (4.3)	30.5 (−0.8)	22.6 (−5.2)	14.4 (−9.8)	31.5 (−0.3)
Mean minimum °F (°C)	−5.0 (−20.6)	0.1 (−17.7)	11.6 (−11.3)	22.8 (−5.1)	28.5 (−1.9)	35.8 (2.1)	43.6 (6.4)	39.5 (4.2)	30.5 (−0.8)	20.5 (−6.4)	9.4 (−12.6)	−3.5 (−19.7)	−9.8 (−23.2)
Record low °F (°C)	−32 (−36)	−36 (−38)	−11 (−24)	10 (−12)	21 (−6)	28 (−2)	34 (1)	26 (−3)	19 (−7)	3 (−16)	−17 (−27)	−29 (−34)	−36 (−38)
Average precipitation inches (mm)	1.51 (38)	1.42 (36)	1.70 (43)	2.04 (52)	2.19 (56)	1.20 (30)	0.56 (14)	0.83 (21)	1.26 (32)	1.54 (39)	1.25 (32)	1.40 (36)	16.90 (429)
Average snowfall inches (cm)	13.6 (35)	10.4 (26)	4.2 (11)	1.9 (4.8)	0.1 (0.25)	0.0 (0.0)	0.0 (0.0)	0.0 (0.0)	0.0 (0.0)	0.4 (1.0)	4.9 (12)	13.5 (34)	49.0 (124)
Average precipitation days (≥ 0.01 in)	10.2	8.9	9.0	10.5	11.0	6.0	4.0	4.3	5.4	7.4	7.4	10.1	94.2
Average snowy days (≥ 0.1 in)	7.1	5.8	2.8	1.0	0.1	0.0	0.0	0.0	0.0	0.4	2.9	7.1	27.2
Source: NOAA

== Demographics ==
Historical population
Census	Pop.	Note	%±
1880	209		—
1890	246		17.7%
1900	227		−7.7%
1910	248		9.3%
1920	551		122.2%
1930	531		−3.6%
1940	553		4.1%
1950	451		−18.4%
1960	448		−0.7%
1970	390		−12.9%
1980	447		14.6%
1990	464		3.8%
2000	449		−3.2%
2010	464		3.3%
2020	512		10.3%
U.S. Decennial Census

As of the census of 2000, there were 449 people, 135 households, and 110 families residing in the town. The population density was 62.0 inhabitants per square mile (23.9/km^{2}). There were 145 housing units at an average density of 20.0 per square mile (7.7/km^{2}). The racial makeup of the town was 95.55% White, 0.22% African American, 0.89% Native American, 0.45% Asian, 2.45% from other races, and 0.45% from two or more races. Hispanic or Latino of any race were 5.35% of the population.

There were 135 households, out of which 51.1% had children under the age of 18 living with them, 74.1% were married couples living together, 5.9% had a female householder with no husband present, and 18.5% were non-families. 16.3% of all households were made up of individuals, and 8.1% had someone living alone who was 65 years of age or older. The average household size was 3.33 and the average family size was 3.79.

In the town, the population was spread out, with 36.7% under the age of 18, 11.6% from 18 to 24, 25.4% from 25 to 44, 17.8% from 45 to 64, and 8.5% who were 65 years of age or older. The median age was 26 years. For every 100 females, there were 112.8 males. For every 100 females age 18 and over, there were 110.4 males.

The median income for a household in the town was $31,250, and the median income for a family was $40,139. Males had a median income of $31,023 versus $20,833 for females. The per capita income for the town was $11,910. About 6.3% of families and 9.1% of the population were below the poverty line, including 10.8% of those under age 18 and 11.8% of those age 65 or over.

== Notable people ==
- J. Blaine Anderson, federal judge
- Don Campora, professional football player

== See also ==
- List of cities and towns in Utah
