= Montgomery Oliver Koelsch =

American judge (1912–1992)

Senior Judge of the United States Court of Appeals for the Ninth Circuit
- In office January 31, 1976 – September 1, 1992

Judge of the United States Court of Appeals for the Ninth Circuit
- In office September 23, 1959 – January 31, 1976
- Appointed by: Dwight D. Eisenhower
- Preceded by: James Alger Fee
- Succeeded by: J. Blaine Anderson

Personal details
- Born: Montgomery Oliver Koelsch; March 5, 1912 Boise, Idaho, US
- Died: September 1, 1992 (aged 80) Seattle, Washington, US
- Education: University of Washington (BA); University of Washington School of Law (LLB)

Montgomery Oliver Koelsch (March 5, 1912 – September 1, 1992) was a United States circuit judge of the United States Court of Appeals for the Ninth Circuit.

== Education and career ==
Born in Boise, Idaho, Koelsch received a Bachelor of Arts degree in history from the University of Washington in Seattle, Washington, in 1932 and a Bachelor of Laws from the University of Washington School of Law in 1935. He was an attorney in private practice in Idaho in Boise from 1936 to 1950 and served as assistant prosecutor for Ada County, Idaho from 1939 to 1945. Koelsch then served as a state judge in the third district from 1951 to 1959, filling a vacancy after his father Charles (1872–1965) retired from the bench.

== Federal judicial service ==
Koelsch was nominated by President Dwight D. Eisenhower on September 12, 1959, to a seat on the United States Court of Appeals for the Ninth Circuit vacated by Judge James Alger Fee. He was confirmed by the United States Senate on September 14, 1959, and received his commission on September 23, 1959. He assumed senior status due to a certified disability on January 31, 1976. His service terminated on September 1, 1992, due to his death in Seattle. His ashes were scattered in Idaho.

Legal offices
Preceded by James Alger Fee	Judge of the United States Court of Appeals for the Ninth Circuit; 1959–1976	Succeeded by J. Blaine Anderson
