= List of United States federal courthouses in Idaho =

Following is a list of current and former courthouses of the United States federal court system located in Idaho. Each entry indicates the name of the building along with an image, if available, its location and the jurisdiction it covers, the dates during which it was used for each such jurisdiction, and, if applicable the person for whom it was named, and the date of renaming. Dates of use will not necessarily correspond with the dates of construction or demolition of a building, as pre-existing structures may be adapted or court use, and former court buildings may later be put to other uses. Also, the official name of the building may be changed at some point after its use as a federal court building has been initiated.

== Courthouses ==
Courthouse	City	Image	Street address	Jurisdiction	Dates of use	Named for
Federal Bldg & U.S. Courthouse	Boise		750 West Bannock Street	D. Idaho	1905–1967; Still a U.S. Post Office and federal offices. Location of Bankruptcy Court through 1995.	n/a
James A. McClure Federal Bldg & U.S. Courthouse^{†}	Boise		550 West Fort Street	D. Idaho	1967–present	U.S. Senator James A. McClure
Coeur d'Alene Federal Building^{†}	Coeur d'Alene		221 North 4th Street	D. Idaho	1928–2009; Now Kootenai County Juvenile Justice Center.	n/a
U.S. Courthouse	Coeur d'Alene		6450 North Mineral Drive	D. Idaho	2009–present	n/a
Moscow City Hall^{†} (Formerly Moscow Post Office & Courthouse and Moscow Federal Building)	Moscow		206 East 3rd Street	D. Idaho	1911–1973; Now Moscow City Hall.	n/a
Moscow Federal Building	Moscow		220 East 5th Street	D. Idaho	1973–present Purchased by local hospital in 2012.	n/a
Pocatello Federal Building^{†}	Pocatello		150 South Arthur Avenue	D. Idaho	1916–1977; Now private office space.	n/a
U.S. Courthouse	Pocatello		801 East Sherman Street	D. Idaho	1999–present	n/a

== Key ==
^{†}	Listed on the National Register of Historic Places (NRHP)
^{††}	NRHP-listed and also designated as a National Historic Landmark
