= J. Blaine Anderson =

American judge (1922–1988)

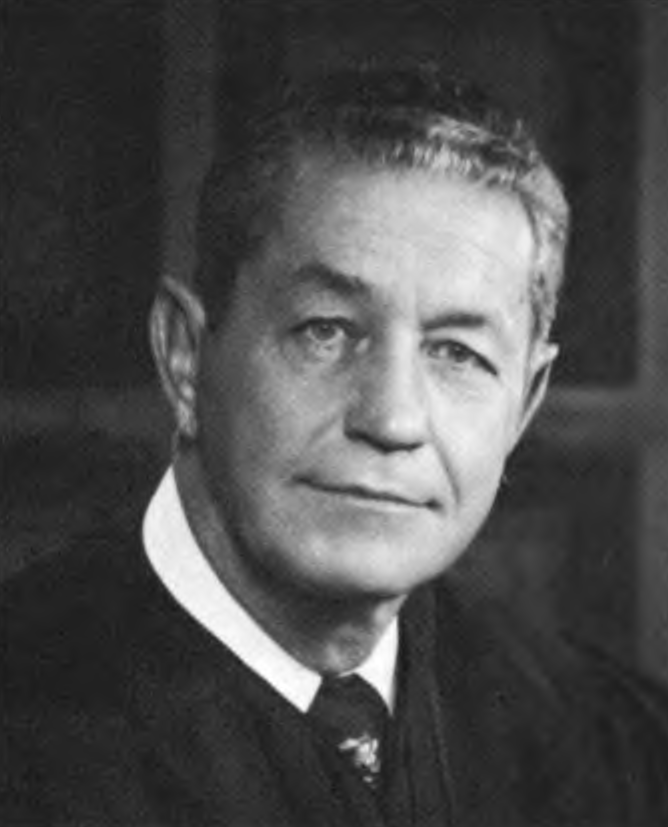

Judge of the United States Court of Appeals for the Ninth Circuit
- In office July 2, 1976 – April 16, 1988
- Appointed by: Gerald Ford
- Preceded by: M. Oliver Koelsch
- Succeeded by: Thomas G. Nelson

Judge of the United States District Court for the District of Idaho
- In office December 9, 1971 – July 23, 1976
- Appointed by: Richard Nixon
- Preceded by: Frederick M. Taylor
- Succeeded by: Marion J. Callister

Personal details
- Born: January 19, 1922 Trenton, Utah, U.S.
- Died: April 16, 1988 (aged 66) Boise, Idaho, U.S.
- Resting place: Morris Hill Cemetery; Boise, Idaho
- Education: University of Washington; University of Idaho College of Law (JD)

J. Blaine Anderson (January 19, 1922 – April 16, 1988) was a United States circuit judge of the United States Court of Appeals for the Ninth Circuit and previously was a United States district judge of the United States District Court for the District of Idaho.

== Education and career ==
Born in Trenton, Utah, Anderson was raised in Pocatello, Idaho. He attended Idaho State College in Pocatello and completed his bachelor's degree at the University of Washington in Seattle. Anderson then attended the University of Idaho in Moscow and received a Juris Doctor from its College of Law in 1949. He was admitted to the bar and was in private practice from 1949 to 1971 in Blackfoot, Idaho.

== Federal judicial service ==
Anderson was nominated by President Richard Nixon on December 1, 1971, to a seat on the U.S. District Court in Idaho vacated by Judge Frederick M. Taylor. He was confirmed by the U.S. Senate on December 4, and received his commission on December 9. His service was terminated on July 23, 1976, due to elevation to the Ninth Circuit.

Anderson was nominated by President Gerald Ford on June 18, 1976, to a seat on the United States Court of Appeals for the Ninth Circuit vacated by Judge M. Oliver Koelsch. He was confirmed by the Senate on July 2 and received his commission the same day; he served until his death in Boise on April 16, 1988, due to a brain aneurysm. He and his wife Grace are buried at Morris Hill Cemetery in Boise.

== Sources ==
Legal offices
Preceded by Fredrick Monroe Taylor	Judge of the United States District Court for the District of Idaho; 1971–1976	Succeeded by Marion Jones Callister
Preceded by Montgomery Oliver Koelsch	Judge of the United States Court of Appeals for the Ninth Circuit; 1976–1988	Succeeded by Thomas G. Nelson
