= Raymond Clyne McNichols =

American judge

Ray McNichols

Senior Judge of the United States District Court for the District of Idaho
- In office July 1, 1981 – December 25, 1985

Chief Judge of the United States District Court for the District of Idaho
- In office 1971–1981
- Preceded by: Fredrick Monroe Taylor
- Succeeded by: Marion Jones Callister

Judge of the United States District Court for the District of Idaho
- In office May 1, 1964 – July 1, 1981
- Appointed by: Lyndon B. Johnson
- Preceded by: Chase A. Clark
- Succeeded by: Harold L. Ryan

Personal details
- Born: Raymond Clyne McNichols; June 16, 1914 Bonners Ferry, Idaho
- Died: December 25, 1985 (aged 71) Boise, Idaho
- Resting place: Morris Hill Cemetery; Boise, Idaho
- Party: Democratic
- Education: University of Idaho College of Law (LL.B.)

Raymond Clyne McNichols (June 16, 1914 – December 25, 1985) was a United States district judge of the United States District Court for the District of Idaho.

== Education and career ==
Born in Bonners Ferry, Idaho, and raised in Lewiston, McNichols served in the United States Navy during World War II, from 1942 to 1947, under Raymond A. Spruance. He attended the University of Idaho in Moscow and received a Bachelor of Laws from its College of Law in 1950. He was in private practice in Orofino in Clearwater County, Idaho from 1950 to 1964. He was a member of the Democratic Party.

== Federal judicial service ==
On April 15, 1964, McNichols was nominated by President Lyndon B. Johnson to a seat on the United States District Court for the District of Idaho vacated by the retirement of Judge Chase A. Clark. He was confirmed by the United States Senate on April 30 and received his commission on May 1, 1964. McNichols served as Chief Judge from 1971 to 1981, and assumed senior status on July 1, 1981, and served in that capacity for over four years, until his death.

== Family ==
McNichols' younger brother Robert James McNichols (1922–1992) was also a federal judge, in Spokane, Washington. During Robert's investiture to the federal bench in January 1980, the elder brother swore the younger in.

== Death ==
McNichols suffered a heart attack at his Boise home on Christmas Day in 1985, and died at age 71 at St. Luke's Regional Medical Center in Boise. He and his wife, Mary Kay Riley McNichols (1914–1991), are buried at Morris Hill Cemetery in Boise. They had two children.

Legal offices
Preceded by Chase A. Clark	Judge of the United States District Court for the District of Idaho; 1964–1981	Succeeded by Harold L. Ryan
Preceded by Fredrick Monroe Taylor	Chief Judge of the United States District Court for the District of Idaho; 1971–1981	Succeeded by Marion Jones Callister
