= Fredrick Monroe Taylor =

American judge (1901–1988)

Fredrick Taylor

Senior Judge of the United States District Court for the District of Idaho
- In office December 15, 1971 – February 16, 1988

Chief Judge of the United States District Court for the District of Idaho
- In office 1964–1971
- Preceded by: Chase Clark
- Succeeded by: Raymond McNichols

Judge of the United States District Court for the District of Idaho
- In office July 20, 1954 – December 15, 1971
- Appointed by: Dwight D. Eisenhower
- Preceded by: Seat established by 68 Stat. 8
- Succeeded by: J. Blaine Anderson

Personal details
- Born: Fredrick Monroe Taylor; February 25, 1901 Nampa, Idaho, U.S.
- Died: February 16, 1988 (aged 86) Boise, Idaho, U.S.
- Resting place: Morris Hill Cemetery; Boise, Idaho
- Education: University of Idaho College of Law (LL.B.)

Fredrick Monroe Taylor (February 25, 1901 – February 16, 1988) was a United States district judge of the United States District Court for the District of Idaho.

== Education ==
Born and raised in Nampa, Idaho, Taylor graduated from Nampa High School and attended the University of Idaho in Moscow. He was a member of Sigma Nu fraternity and received a Bachelor of Laws from the College of Law in 1926.

== Early career ==
Taylor was in private practice in Idaho in Valley County at Cascade from 1927 to 1938, and a prosecuting attorney of Valley County from 1927 to 1933, and from 1935 to 1938, returning to private practice in Boise from 1938 to 1954. He was a member of the Idaho Senate from 1943 to 1951, and was city attorney of Boise from 1944 to 1946. Taylor was the campaign manager for Herman Welker in 1950, who was elected to the U.S. Senate.

== Federal judicial service ==
Taylor was nominated by President Dwight D. Eisenhower on July 9, 1954, to the U.S. District Court in Idaho, to a new seat authorized by 68 Stat. 8. Confirmed by the U.S. Senate on July 20, 1954, he received his commission the same day. Taylor served as Chief Judge from 1964 to 1971, and was a member of the Judicial Conference of the United States from 1969 to 1972. He assumed senior status on December 15, 1971, and his service continued until his death on February 16, 1988.

=== Notable case ===
During his tenure, Taylor was in the majority for the 1975 case Warren Jones Co. v. Commissioner.

Legal offices
Preceded by Seat established by 68 Stat. 8	Judge of the United States District Court for the District of Idaho; 1954–1971	Succeeded by J. Blaine Anderson
Preceded by Chase A. Clark	Chief Judge of the United States District Court for the District of Idaho; 1964–1971	Succeeded by Raymond Clyne McNichols
