= Marion Jones Callister =

American judge (1921–1997)

Marion Callister
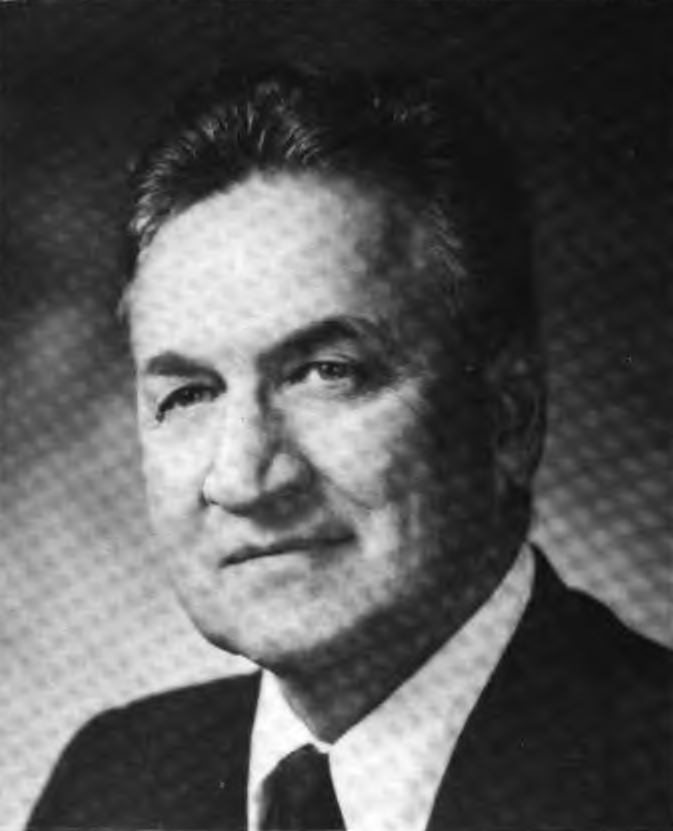

Senior Judge of the United States District Court for the District of Idaho
- In office June 6, 1989 – June 24, 1997

Chief Judge of the United States District Court for the District of Idaho
- In office 1981–1988
- Preceded by: Raymond McNichols
- Succeeded by: Harold L. Ryan

Judge of the United States District Court for the District of Idaho
- In office September 1, 1976 – June 6, 1989
- Appointed by: Gerald Ford
- Preceded by: J. Blaine Anderson
- Succeeded by: Edward Lodge

Personal details
- Born: Marion Jones Callister; June 6, 1921 Moreland, Idaho, U.S.
- Died: June 24, 1997 (aged 76) Boise, Idaho
- Resting place: Morris Hill Cemetery; Boise, Idaho
- Party: Republican
- Spouse(s): Nina Lynn Hayes (m.1946–1997, his death)
- Children: 12
- Education: University of Utah (BSL, JD)

Military service
- Allegiance: United States
- Branch/service: U.S. Army
- Years of service: 1944–1946
- Battles/wars: World War II

Marion Jones Callister (June 6, 1921 – June 24, 1997) was an American attorney and jurist who served as a judge of the United States District Court for the District of Idaho.

== Early life and education ==
Born in Moreland, Idaho, Callister graduated from Blackfoot High School in 1939 and served in the United States Army during World War II, from 1944 to 1946. He received a Bachelor of Science in Law from the University of Utah in 1950 and a Juris Doctor from its S.J. Quinney College of Law in 1951.

== Career ==
Callister returned to Idaho and was an assistant Bingham County attorney in Blackfoot from 1951 to 1952, and an Assistant U.S. Attorney from 1953 to 1957. He was in private practice in Boise from 1958 to 1969, was a state district judge from 1970 to 1975, and became the U.S. Attorney for Idaho in 1975.

=== Federal judicial service ===
On July 19, 1976, Callister was nominated by President Gerald Ford to a seat on the U.S. District Court vacated by Judge J. Blaine Anderson. Callister was confirmed by the U.S. Senate on August 26, and received his commission on September 1, 1976. Callister served as Chief Judge from 1981 to 1988, and assumed senior status at age 68 on June 6, 1989. He served in that capacity for eight years, until his death in 1997 in Boise.

== Personal life ==
Callister was a member of the Church of Jesus Christ of Latter-day Saints. As a young man, he served as a missionary: he was later bishop of the Boise 3rd Ward, counselor in and then president of the Boise West Stake, and a regional representative of the Twelve. Callister is buried at Morris Hill Cemetery in Boise.

== Sources ==
Legal offices
Preceded by J. Blaine Anderson	Judge of the United States District Court for the District of Idaho; 1976–1989	Succeeded by Edward Lodge
Preceded by Raymond Clyne McNichols	Chief Judge of the United States District Court for the District of Idaho; 1981–1988	Succeeded by Harold L. Ryan
