= B. Lynn Winmill =

American judge (born 1952)

Lynn Winmill
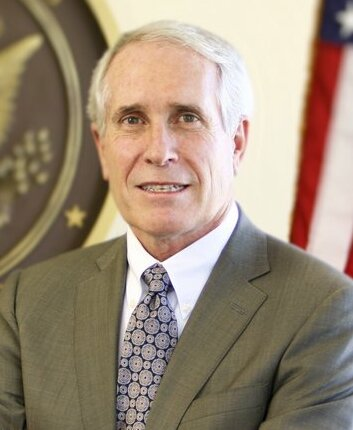

Senior Judge of the United States District Court for the District of Idaho
- Incumbent
- Assumed office August 16, 2021

Chief Judge of the United States District Court for the District of Idaho
- In office July 1999 – January 1, 2019
- Preceded by: Edward Lodge
- Succeeded by: David Nye

Judge of the United States District Court for the District of Idaho
- In office August 14, 1995 – August 16, 2021
- Appointed by: Bill Clinton
- Preceded by: Harold L. Ryan
- Succeeded by: Amanda Brailsford

Personal details
- Born: Barry Lynn Winmill; 1952 (age 73–74) Blackfoot, Idaho, U.S.
- Education: Idaho State University (BA); Harvard University (JD)

Barry Lynn Winmill (born 1952) is a senior United States district judge of the United States District Court for the District of Idaho.

== Early life and education ==
Born and raised in Blackfoot, Idaho, Winmill grew up on a dairy farm. He received a Bachelor of Arts degree from Idaho State University (ISU) in Pocatello in 1974, where he was student body president. Winmill earned his Juris Doctor from Harvard Law School in 1977.

== Legal career ==
Following law school, Winmill was in private practice for two years in Denver, Colorado, and back in Pocatello from 1979 to 1987.

== Judicial career ==
=== State judicial service ===
Appointed by Governor Cecil Andrus in 1987, Winmill was a state judge in the Idaho District Court (Sixth District) in Pocatello from 1987 to 1995. From 1992 to 1995, he served as the administrative district judge and chair of the state's Evidence Rules Committee.

Winmill was concurrently an adjunct professor at ISU (1991–1995), and a finalist on three occasions for the Idaho Supreme Court, but he was never nominated.

=== Federal judicial service ===
On May 24, 1995, Winmill was nominated by President Bill Clinton to a seat on the U.S. District Court for the District of Idaho, vacated by Judge Harold L. Ryan, who assumed senior status in early 1993. (Note: Clinton's original nominee for the vacancy was lawyer John Tait of Lewiston. That nomination was one of many that year blocked for political reasons. The state's Republican U.S. Senators, Larry Craig and Dirk Kempthorne, opposed Tait's nomination.) The American Bar Association's Standing Committee on the Federal Judiciary, which rates judicial nominees, unanimously rated Winmill as "well qualified" for the post (the committee's highest rating).

Confirmed by the Senate by voice vote on August 11, 1995, Winmill received his commission three days later. He served as chief judge for over 19 years, from 1999 to January 1, 2019, and assumed senior status on August 16, 2021.

=== Noteworthy cases ===
Winmill granted the habeas corpus petition of Charles Fain, a wrongfully convicted man who spent 18 years on Idaho's death row. Winmill ordered DNA testing that was previously unavailable; the new testing exonerated Fain, who was released from prison. Winmill and Fain later made joint speaking appearances.

In 1999, Winmill presided over the trial of Allan Elias, a southeastern Idaho businessman, on charges arising from a 1996 incident in which Elias ordered an employee, who lacked safety training or proper protective equipment, to clean the inside of a large tank that stored a toxic mixture of phosphoric acid and cyanide. The employee suffered severe brain damage, and Elias was convicted of "knowingly endangering the safety and health of his employees, illegally disposing of hazardous cyanide waste and making a false statement to the Occupational Safety and Health Administration." In 2000, Winmill sentenced Elias to 17 years in prison, the longest-ever sentence in the United States for an environmental crime.

In Western Watersheds Project v. Fish and Wildlife Service (2007), Winmill ordered the United States Fish and Wildlife Service (FWS) to reconsider its decision not to list the sage-grouse as an endangered or threatened species under the Endangered Species Act. In an opinion highly critical of FWS officials, Winmill singled out deputy assistant secretary Julie A. MacDonald for criticism, and held that the agency had impermissibly disregarded scientific evidence in making its decision to deny protection to the sage-grouse.

In Animal Legal Defense Fund v. Otter (2015), Winmill struck down the "ag gag" law passed by the Idaho Legislature in 2012, ruling that the statute—which, among other things, banned the audio or visual recording of agricultural operations—violated the Free Speech Clause of the First Amendment to the United States Constitution. In January 2018, the U.S. Court of Appeals for the Ninth Circuit upheld most of the ruling.

In Edmo v. Idaho Department of Correction (2018), Winmill ruled in favor of a transgender inmate diagnosed with gender dysphoria, who challenged the state's refusal to provide gender confirmation surgery. Winmill ruled that the state's disregard of the "generally accepted medical standards for the treatment of gender dysphoria" constituted deliberate indifference to the inmate's medical needs, in violation of the Eighth Amendment to the United States Constitution.

On August 13, 2026, in Seyb v. Members of the Idaho Board of Medicine, et al (2024), Winfill ruled in favor of the plaintiff, finding that the state's de facto abortion ban, legislated via Idaho's Defense of Life and the Fetal Heartbeat Acts, violates due process and equal protection clauses under the 14th Amendment.

== Personal life ==
Winmill is married; he and his wife Judy have four children and fourteen grandchildren.

He has served as a member of the board of the Idaho Humanities Council; as a member of the Board of Visitors of Brigham Young University's J. Reuben Clark Law School; and as a co-founder of the Idaho Legal History Society, which sponsored the performance of an original play marking the hundredth anniversary of the high-profile trial of Big Bill Haywood.

== Notes ==
Legal offices
Preceded by Harold L. Ryan	Judge of the United States District Court for the District of Idaho; 1995–2021	Succeeded by Amanda Brailsford
Preceded by Edward Lodge	Chief Judge of the United States District Court for the District of Idaho; 1999–2019	Succeeded by David Nye
