= Thomas G. Nelson =

American judge (1936–2011)

Thomas George Nelson
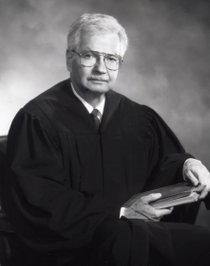

Senior Judge of the United States Court of Appeals for the Ninth Circuit
- In office July 14, 2004 – May 4, 2011

Judge of the United States Court of Appeals for the Ninth Circuit
- In office October 17, 1990 – July 14, 2004
- Appointed by: George H. W. Bush
- Preceded by: J. Blaine Anderson
- Succeeded by: N. Randy Smith

Personal details
- Born: Thomas George Nelson; November 14, 1936 Idaho Falls, Idaho, US
- Died: May 4, 2011 (aged 74) Boise, Idaho, US
- Resting place: Idaho State Veterans Cemetery, Boise, Idaho
- Party: Republican
- Education: University of Idaho (LLB)

Thomas George Nelson (November 14, 1936 – May 4, 2011) was a United States circuit judge of the United States Court of Appeals for the Ninth Circuit from 1990 to 2004.

== Education and career ==
Born and raised in Idaho Falls, Idaho, Nelson graduated from Idaho Falls High School on 1955 and attended the University of Idaho in Moscow. He was a member of Delta Tau Delta fraternity, and received a Bachelor of Laws from its College of Law in 1962. Nelson served as assistant state attorney general and chief deputy state attorney general from 1963 to 1965. He was in the Idaho Air National Guard from 1962 to 1965 and the United States Army Reserve from 1965 to 1968. He served in the Judge Advocate General's Corps and was a first lieutenant. He was in private practice of law in Twin Falls from 1965 to 1990.

== Federal judicial service ==
In 1990, Nelson was nominated to the United States Court of Appeals for the Ninth Circuit by President George H. W. Bush on July 18 for the seat vacated by the death of J. Blaine Anderson in 1988. Nelson was confirmed by the U.S. Senate on October 12 and received his commission on October 17, 1990. He was on the bench for thirteen years when he assumed senior status on July 14, 2004.

== Death ==
Nelson died at age 74 on May 4, 2011, and is buried at the Idaho State Veterans Cemetery in Boise.

Legal offices
Preceded by J. Blaine Anderson	Judge of the United States Court of Appeals for the Ninth Circuit; 1990–2003	Succeeded by N. Randy Smith
