= Helen Young (lawyer) =

American lawyer

Helen Louise Nichols Young (1862–1951), also referred to as "Nellie Young," was the first female admitted to practice law in the state of Idaho.

== Early life ==
She was born in 1862 in Lansing, Michigan to Sarah A. Nichols. Her family traveled to California and Nevada before finally settling in Osburn, Idaho. In 1870, Young's mother Sarah A. Nichols remarried to Daniel E. Waldron. He was an attorney, and may have inspired Young to enter the legal field. According to the 1880 census, the Waldron family lived in San Francisco, California where Waldron practiced law in an office on Bush Street. A short time later, the Waldron family moved again to north Idaho, where the economy was booming from the mining industry. In the small town of Osburn, Waldron began practicing law. It is believed that Hellen Young began studying law in her stepfather’s office as early as 1885.

Young met Orville R. Young, a miner living in Osburn, and married him on June 29, 1887 in Blaine, Idaho. She began teaching in the public schools of Shoshone County, Idaho shortly thereafter, in 1888. In 1892, a ruling against her husband, the bank try to collect on its judgment by selling Young’s separate property-two lode mining claims known as the “Coeur d’Alene Nellie” and the “Emma” situated in Evolution mining district in Shoshone County. Young hired Weldon Brinton Heyburn to represent her in the title action challenging the sale.

== Admittance to Idaho State Bar ==
On October 26, 1895, Young was admitted to the Idaho State Bar on October 26, 1895. At the time of her application, Idaho statutes limited the admission of attorneys in the state to "white males". Despite this restriction, the Idaho Supreme Court granted her application—perhaps due to Young's application being sponsored by her stepfather, Weldon Brinton Heyburn (who represented her in a mining case), and W. W. Woods. The latter two individuals were delegates of the Idaho State Constitutional Convention in 1889.

When Young was admitted, women had not yet been granted the right to vote in the state. Even after being allowed to practice law, Young still continued to work as an educator before she embarked on a political career. She ran against Charles Vance in 1900 for Superintendent of Public Instruction for Shoshone County and won the election by margin of 9 votes. She died in 1951 while residing in New York City, New York.

== See also ==
- List of first women lawyers and judges in Idaho
