= Idaho Industrial Commission =

State agency in Idaho, United States

Agency overview
- Headquarters: 11321 W Chinden Blvd Building #2, Boise, Idaho 83714
- Website: https://iic.idaho.gov/

The Idaho Industrial Commission is a state agency in Idaho responsible for managing the state's workers' compensation system. The agency also acts as an administrative court for unemployment insurance decisions issued by the Idaho Department of Labor or Idaho Department of Commerce.

The agency was established in 1918 by the Idaho Legislature. The commission includes three commissioners, including one chairman.
