= Dietrich Cabin =

Historic house in Kansas, United States

- U.S. National Register of Historic Places
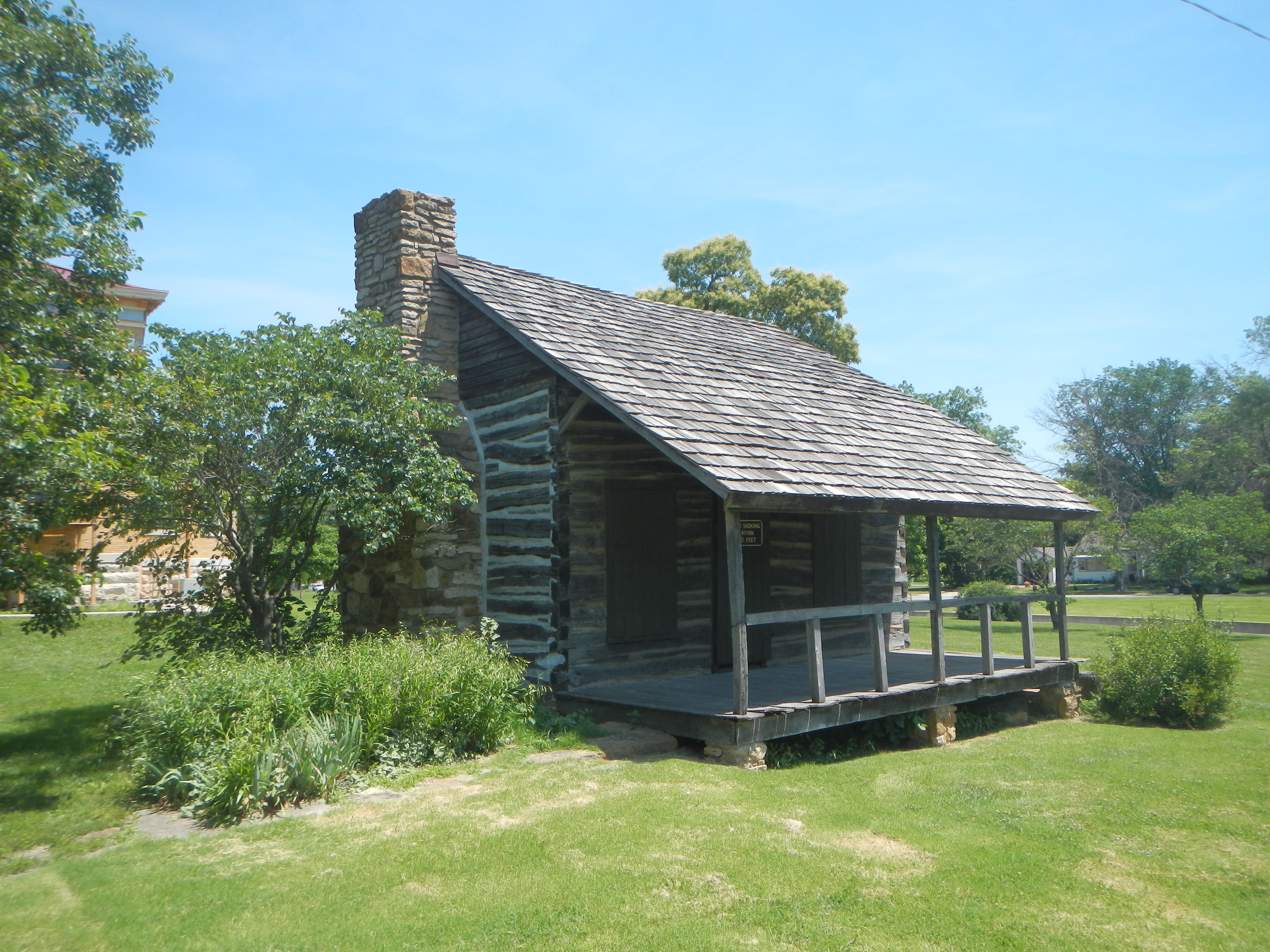

- Location within Kansas Location within the United States
- Location: Ottawa City Park, Ottawa, Kansas
- Coordinates: 38°36′39″N 95°16′3″W
- Area: 1 acre (0.40 ha)
- Built: 1859
- Built by: Dietrich, Jacob
- Architectural style: Frontier style
- NRHP reference No.: 72000500
- Added to NRHP: February 23, 1972

The Dietrich Cabin is a log cabin located in Ottawa City Park in Ottawa, Kansas. Jacob Dietrich, a German immigrant, built the cabin in 1859, replacing the family's original home constructed in 1857, which had burned down the following year. After Dietrich's death in 1863, his wife Catherine maintained the cabin while raising their three sons.

The structure was later converted into a farmhouse, with several rooms added over time. In 1961, the cabin was restored to its original condition. It now operates as a pioneer museum under the management of the Franklin County Historical Society and is open to the public on Sunday afternoons during the summer.

The cabin is one of the few surviving examples in Kansas of a pioneer log cabin, an important building type in both the settlement and architectural history of the state.

The cabin was added to the National Register of Historic Places on February 23, 1972.
