= Amanda Brailsford =

American judge (born 1967)

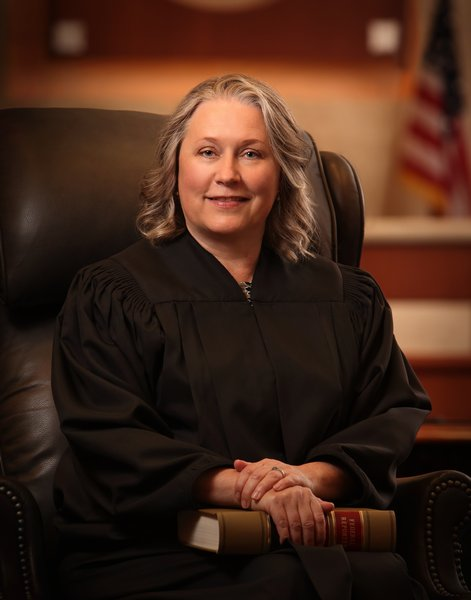

Chief Judge of the United States District Court for the District of Idaho
- Incumbent
- Assumed office January 2, 2026
- Preceded by: David Nye

Judge of the United States District Court for the District of Idaho
- Incumbent
- Assumed office May 17, 2023
- Appointed by: Joe Biden
- Preceded by: B. Lynn Winmill

Judge of the Idaho Court of Appeals
- In office January 2019 – May 17, 2023
- Appointed by: Butch Otter
- Preceded by: Sergio Gutierrez
- Succeeded by: Michael Tribe

Personal details
- Born: Amanda Kathleen Brailsford; 1967 (age 58–59) Twin Falls, Idaho, U.S.
- Education: University of Idaho (BA, JD)

Amanda Kathleen Brailsford (born 1967) is the chief United States district judge of the United States District Court for the District of Idaho. She previously served as a judge of the Idaho Court of Appeals from 2019 to 2023.

== Education ==
Born in Twin Falls, Idaho, Brailsford grew up in Hagerman. She received a Bachelor of Arts from the University of Idaho in Moscow in 1989 and a Juris Doctor from its College of Law in 1993.

== Career ==
Following law school, Brailsford served as a law clerk for Judge Thomas G. Nelson of the United States Court of Appeals for the Ninth Circuit from 1993 to 1995. She worked at the Boise office of Holland & Hart LLP as an associate from 1995 to 2002, and as a partner from 2003 to 2013. She was a founding partner of the law firm of Andersen Banducci PLLC from 2013 to 2017.

=== Idaho Court of Appeals ===
On November 30, 2018, Brailsford was appointed as a judge of the Idaho Court of Appeals by Governor Butch Otter to the seat vacated by the retirement of Judge Sergio Gutierrez. She assumed office in 2019 and left in 2023 to become a federal judge.

==== Notable rulings ====
In 2022, Brailsford wrote the opinion for the Idaho Court of Appeals affirming an aggravated DUI conviction for Cyrus Buehler. Buehler was accused of being intoxicated while driving his pickup truck that struck a man operating a motorized bicycle.

Also that year, Brailsford wrote the opinion for the court affirming Shoshone County Sheriff Darrell Gunderson's decision to deny a concealed weapons license to Robert Peterson. Gunderson disqualified Peterson due to his prior conviction of possessing material sexually exploiting children.

=== Federal judicial service ===
On January 18, 2023, President Joe Biden announced his intent to nominate Brailsford to serve as a United States district judge of the U.S. District Court in Idaho. On January 31, 2023, her nomination was sent to the United States Senate. President Biden nominated Brailsford to the seat vacated by Judge B. Lynn Winmill, who assumed senior status on August 16, 2021. On March 22, 2023, a hearing on her nomination was held before the Senate Judiciary Committee. On April 27, 2023, her nomination was reported out of committee by a voice vote. On May 4, 2023, the United States Senate confirmed her nomination by a voice vote. Brailsford received her judicial commission on May 17, 2023, and was sworn in on May 19, 2023. She is the first woman to serve on the U.S. District Court in Idaho. She became chief judge of the court in 2026.

==== Notable cases ====
In Creech v. United States District Court for the District of Idaho, Brailsford received calls to recuse herself from a lawsuit brought by death row inmate Thomas Eugene Creech alleging prosecutorial fabrication of evidence. Brailsford had a close personal friendship with Ada County Prosecutor Jan Bennetts, whose office oversaw the prosecution of Creech for the 1981 murder of inmate David Dale Jenson. While previously having clerked with and developed a friendship with Bennetts under Judge Thomas G. Nelson in 1993, Brailsford justified her lack of recusal by saying the two had "lost touch". Writing for a three judge panel for the Ninth Circuit Court of Appeals, Judge Jay Bybee determined that, while Brailsford likely would have been able to hear the case in good faith, her impartiality would have been reasonably questioned due to the unique circumstances of the case, ultimately supporting her removal from the case.

Legal offices
Preceded by B. Lynn Winmill	Judge of the United States District Court for the District of Idaho; 2023–present	Incumbent
Preceded by David Nye	Chief Judge of the United States District Court for the District of Idaho; 2026–present	Incumbent
