= N. Randy Smith =

American judge (born 1949)

Randy Smith
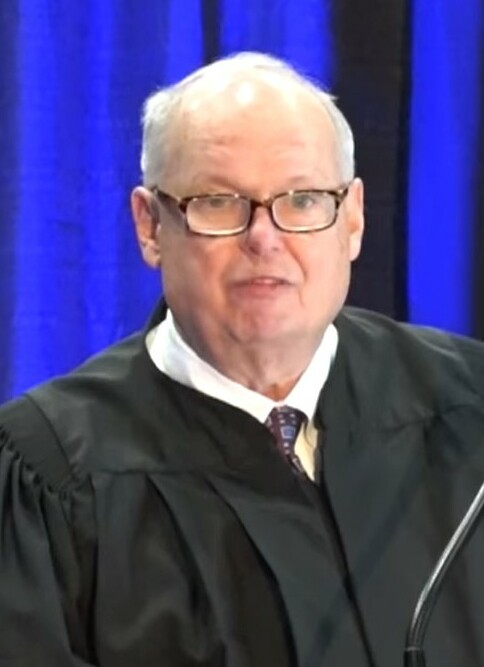
- Smith in 2019

Senior Judge of the United States Court of Appeals for the Ninth Circuit
- Incumbent
- Assumed office August 11, 2018

Judge of the United States Court of Appeals for the Ninth Circuit
- In office March 19, 2007 – August 11, 2018
- Appointed by: George W. Bush
- Preceded by: Thomas G. Nelson
- Succeeded by: Ryan D. Nelson

Chair of the Idaho Republican Party
- In office 1993–1994
- Preceded by: Phil Batt
- Succeeded by: Ron McMurray

Personal details
- Born: Norman Randy Smith; 1949 (age 76–77) Logan, Utah, U.S.
- Party: Republican
- Education: Brigham Young University (BS, JD)

Norman Randy Smith (born 1949) is a senior United States circuit judge of the United States Court of Appeals for the Ninth Circuit. He lives and maintains chambers in Pocatello, Idaho.

== Background ==
A native of southeastern Idaho, Smith attended Brigham Young University in Provo, Utah, where he received his Bachelor of Science degree in 1974. He received his Juris Doctor from J. Reuben Clark Law School at Brigham Young University in 1977. Following law school, he returned to Idaho and practiced from 1977 to 1981 as associate and assistant general counsel for the J.R. Simplot Company, one of the largest privately owned companies in the world. Smith concurrently taught business and accounting courses at Boise State University from 1979 to 1981.

In 1982, Smith joined the law firm Merrill & Merrill, where he remained for thirteen years, first as an associate, and later as a partner beginning in 1984. That same year he began a long second career as an adjunct professor at Idaho State University where he continues teaching accounting, business law, and political science courses in the Economics and Political Science Departments. Smith served as Chairman of the Idaho Republican Party (Defeated then former State Senator Bill Ringert) (1993–1994) and helped manage the campaign of Idaho governor Phil Batt in 1994. Smith left private practice in 1995 following an appointment by Batt to become a state judge for the sixth district in Pocatello, a position he held until his confirmation to the U.S. Court of Appeals for the Ninth Circuit.

In 1984, Smith was mentioned in a General Conference talk by Elder Marvin J. Ashton of the Church of Jesus Christ of Latter-day Saints. Ashton spoke of Smith's call to be a bishop in Pocatello.

== Ninth Circuit nominations and confirmation ==
Smith was nominated by President George W. Bush to two different vacancies on the Ninth Circuit before eventually being confirmed. The first nomination, on December 16, 2005, was to fill the vacancy left by Judge Stephen S. Trott. However, after opposition from California's U.S. Senators Dianne Feinstein and Barbara Boxer, who argued that Smith, an Idahoan, had been nominated to a "California seat", his nomination stalled in the 109th Congress.

Following the Democratic Party takeover of the United States Senate in the aftermath of the November 2006 elections, and the withdrawal of fellow Ninth Circuit nominee William Myers, Bush resubmitted Smith's name to the 110th Congress on January 16, 2007. The new nomination was to the seat left by Idaho Judge Thomas G. Nelson, who assumed senior status. On February 15, 2007, the Senate confirmed Smith by a 94–0 vote, over a year after his original nomination. He received his commission on March 19, 2007. He assumed senior status on August 11, 2018.

== Decisions ==
His first published opinion for the Ninth Circuit was United States v. Zalapa, which dealt with multiplicity of criminal convictions.

In February 2012, Smith authored a dissent to the Ninth Circuit's decision in Perry v. Brown holding California Proposition 8 unconstitutional. He did agree with the majority that the appellants had standing to bring the appeal, and that Judge Vaughn Walker's decision should not be vacated on allegations of bias.

Party political offices
Preceded by Phil Batt	Chairm of the Idaho Republican Party; 1993–1994	Succeeded by Ron McMurray
Legal offices
Preceded by Thomas G. Nelson	Judge of the United States Court of Appeals for the Ninth Circuit; 2007–2018	Succeeded by Ryan D. Nelson
