= Idaho Court of Appeals =

Intermediate appellate court of Idaho

The Idaho Court of Appeals is the intermediate-level appellate court for the state of Idaho; created by statute by the state legislature, operations began in 1982. The court is housed in the Idaho Supreme Court building in Boise.

== Jurisdiction ==
The Court of Appeals hears cases assigned to it by the Idaho Supreme Court. The only exceptions to this jurisdiction are capital murder convictions and appeals from the state's public utilities commission and industrial commission (which administers the state's workers' compensation laws), which must be heard by the state supreme court.

== Judges ==
Name	Start	Term End	Appointer	Law school
Michael Tribe, Chief Judge	January 23, 2024	January 2027	Brad Little (R)	Idaho
Jessica Lorello	October 3, 2017	January 2031	Butch Otter (R)	North Carolina
Theodore Fleming	May 27, 2026	January 2032	Brad Little (R)	Oklahoma City
Gene Petty	June 30, 2026	January 2029	Brad Little (R)	Loyola Chicago

== Succession of seats ==
Seat 1Established in 1980
Name	Term
Jesse Walters	1982–1997
Alan Schwartzman	1997–2002
Sergio Gutierrez	2002–2018
Amanda Brailsford	2019–2023
Michael Tribe	2024–present

Seat 2Established in 1980
Name	Term
Donald Burnett	1982–1990
Cathy Silak	1990–1993
Karen Lansing	1993–2015
Molly Huskey	2015–2026
Gene Petty	2026-

Seat 3Established in 1980
Name	Term
Roger Swanstrom	1982–1993
Darrel Perry	1993–2009
John Melanson	2009–2017
Jessica Lorello	2017–present

Seat 4Established in 2008
Name	Term
David Gratton	2009–2026
Theodore Fleming	2026-
