= Idaho State Bar =

Bar Association

- Type: Legal Society
- Headquarters: Boise, ID
- Location: United States
- Members: 6,100 in 2016
- Executive Director: Diane Minnich
- Website: http://isb.idaho.gov/

The Idaho State Bar (ISB) is the integrated (mandatory) bar association of the U.S. state of Idaho. It is a self-governing state agency of the State of Idaho.

== History ==
Portions of the Idaho Code pertaining to the practice of law in Idaho date back to 1881. The present "integrated" Bar was established by the Idaho Legislature in 1923.

== Structure ==
The ISB operates under authority delegated by the Idaho Supreme Court through its rule making power, particularly in the area of admissions and discipline. The rules that govern the process are known as the "Idaho Bar Commission Rules."

The ISB is governed by five commissioners, elected from the seven districts into which the state is divided. Commissioners serve for staggered three years terms. The current executive director of the ISB is Diane Minnich.

=== Committees ===
- Bar Exam Preparation
- Character & Fitness
- Client Assistance Fund
- Lawyer Referral Service
- The Advocate Editorial Advisory Board
- Unauthorized Practice of Law
- Reasonable Accommodations
- Professional Conduct Board
- Lawyers Assistance Program
- Idaho Academy of Leadership for Lawyers
