= United States District Court for the District of Idaho =

United States federal district court of Idaho

Coordinates: 43.6207°N 116.1944°W

- (D. Idaho)
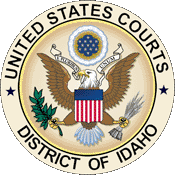

- Location: Boise More locations: Pocatello; Coeur d'Alene; Moscow
- Appeals to: Ninth Circuit
- Established: July 3, 1890
- Judges: 2
- Chief Judge: Amanda Brailsford

Officers of the court
- U.S. Attorney: John Shirts (interim)
- U.S. Marshal: Brent R. Bunn
- www.idd.uscourts.gov/district/

The United States District Court for the District of Idaho (in case citations, D. Idaho) is the Federal district court whose jurisdiction comprises the state of Idaho (except for the part of the state within Yellowstone National Park, which is under the jurisdiction of the United States District Court for the District of Wyoming). Court is held in Boise, Coeur d'Alene, and Pocatello. Cases from the District of Idaho are appealed to the United States Court of Appeals for the Ninth Circuit (except for patent claims and claims against the U.S. government under the Tucker Act, which are appealed to the Federal Circuit).

The United States Attorney's Office for the District of Idaho represents the United States in civil and criminal litigation in the court. As of October 17, 2026, the U.S. attorney for the District of Idaho is John Shirts.

== History ==
The District of Idaho was established shortly after Idaho's admission as a U.S. state. On July 3, 1890, by 26 Stat. 215, the United States Congress organized Idaho as one judicial district, authorizing one judgeship for the court and assigning it to the Ninth Circuit. The second judgeship was authorized by Congress on February 10, 1954, by 68 Stat. 8.

== Current judges ==
As of January 2, 2026:

#	Title	Judge	Duty station	Born	Term of service			Appointed by
#	Title	Judge	Duty station	Born	Active	Chief	Senior	Appointed by
13	Chief Judge	Amanda Brailsford	Boise	1967	2023–present	2026–present	—	Biden
12	District Judge	David Nye	Pocatello	1958	2017–present	2019–2026	—	Trump
10	Senior Judge	Edward Lodge	inactive	1933	1989–2015	1992–1999	2015–present	G.H.W. Bush
11	Senior Judge	B. Lynn Winmill	Boise	1952	1995–2021	1999–2019	2021–present	Clinton

== Former judges ==
#	Judge	Born–died	Active service	Chief Judge	Senior status	Appointed by	Reason for termination
1	James H. Beatty	1836–1927	1891–1907 (Note: Recess appointment; formally nominated on December 10, 1891, confirmed by the United States Senate on February 4, 1892, and received his commission the same day.)	—	—	B. Harrison	retirement
2	Frank Sigel Dietrich	1863–1930	1907–1927 (Note: Recess appointment; formally nominated on December 3, 1907, confirmed by the Senate on December 17, 1907, and received his commission the same day.)	—	—	T. Roosevelt	elevation
3	Charles Cheatham Cavanah	1871–1953	1927–1942	—	1942–1953	Coolidge	death
4	Chase A. Clark	1883–1966	1943–1964	1954–1964	1964–1966	F. Roosevelt	death
5	Fredrick Monroe Taylor	1901–1988	1954–1971	1964–1971	1971–1988	Eisenhower	death
6	Raymond Clyne McNichols	1914–1985	1964–1981	1971–1981	1981–1985	L. Johnson	death
7	J. Blaine Anderson	1922–1988	1971–1976	—	—	Nixon	elevation
8	Marion Jones Callister	1921–1997	1976–1989	1981–1988	1989–1997	Ford	death
9	Harold L. Ryan	1923–1995	1981–1992	1988–1992	1992–1995	Reagan	death

== Chief judges ==
Chief judges have administrative responsibilities with respect to their district court. Unlike the Supreme Court, where one justice is specifically nominated to be chief, the office of chief judge rotates among the district court judges. To be chief, a judge must have been in active service on the court for at least one year, be under the age of 65, and have not previously served as chief judge.

A vacancy is filled by the judge highest in seniority among the group of qualified judges. The chief judge serves for a term of seven years, or until age 70, whichever occurs first. The age restrictions are waived if no members of the court would otherwise be qualified for the position.

When the office was created in 1948, the chief judge was the longest-serving judge who had not elected to retire, on what has since 1958 been known as senior status, or declined to serve as chief judge. After August 6, 1959, judges could not become or remain chief after turning 70 years old. The current rules have been in operation since October 1, 1982.

== Succession of seats ==
Seat 1
Seat established on July 3, 1890 by 26 Stat. 215
Beatty	1892–1907
Dietrich	1907–1927
Cavanah	1927–1942
Clark	1943–1964
McNichols	1964–1981
Ryan	1981–1992
Winmill	1995–2021
Brailsford	2023–present

Seat 2
Seat established on February 10, 1954 by 68 Stat. 8
Taylor	1954–1971
Anderson	1971–1976
Callister	1976–1989
Lodge	1989–2015
Nye	2017–present

== U.S. Attorneys ==
- Richard Williams 1863-64
- George C. Hough 1864-67
- Joseph W. Huston 1869
- Norman Buck 1878-80
- James B. Butler 1880-81
- Wallace R. White 1881-85
- James H. Hawley 1885-89
- Willis Sweet 1889-90
- Fremont Wood 1890-93
- James H. Forney 1893-97
- Robert V. Cozier 1897-1904
- Norman M. Ruick 1904-08
- Curg H. Lingenfelter 1908-13
- James L. McClear 1913-21
- Edwin G. Davis 1921-25
- James F. Ailshie 1925
- Hoyt E. Ray 1925-33
- John A. Carver 1933-53
- Sherman F. Furey, Jr. 1953-57
- Ben Peterson 1957-59
- Kenneth G. Bergquist 1959-61
- Sylvan A. Jeppesen 1961-68
- Jay F. Bates 1968-69
- Sherman F. Furey, Jr. 1969-71
- Sidney E. Smith 1971-75
- Wilbur T. Nelson 1975
- Marion J. Callister 1975-76
- Wilbur T. Nelson 1976-77
- Paul L. Westberg 1977
- M. Karl Shirtliff 1977-81
- Guy G. Hurlbutt 1981-84
- William Van Hale 1984-85
- Maurice O. Ellsworth 1985-93
- Patrick J. Molloy 1993
- Betty Hansen Richardson 1993-2001
- Thomas E. Moss 2001-2010
- Wendy J. Olson 2010-2017
- Bart Davis 2017-2021
- Rafael M. Gonzalez Jr. 2021-2022
- Joshua Hurwit 2022-2025
- Bart Davis 2025-2026
- John Shirts 2026-

== See also ==
- Courts of Idaho
- List of United States federal courthouses in Idaho
- United States Court of Appeals for the Ninth Circuit
