= University of Idaho College of Law =

Public law school in Moscow, Idaho, US

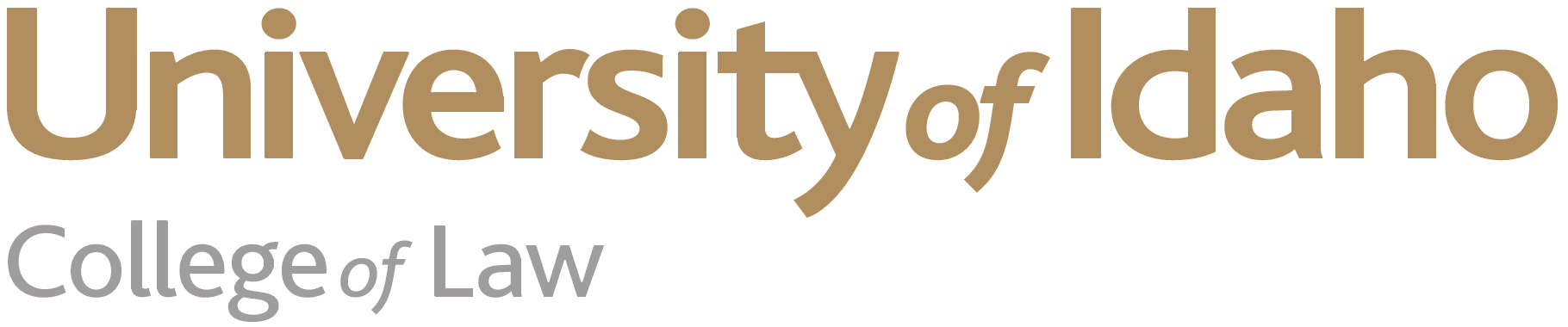
- Parent school: University of Idaho
- Established: 1909, 117 years ago
- School type: Public
- Dean: Vacant
- Location: Moscow and Boise, Idaho, U.S. 46.728°N 117.016°W
- Enrollment: 343
- Faculty: 40
- USNWR ranking: 145th (tie) (2024)
- Bar pass rate: 73.03% (2017)
- Website: www.uidaho.edu/law
- ABA profile: UI College of Law Profile

The University of Idaho College of Law is the law school of the University of Idaho. Its main location is in Moscow, and a second campus is in the state capital of Boise. As of the entering class of 2017–18, students may take all three years of instruction at either location. The UI College of Law was established in 1909, has been a member of the Association of American Law Schools since 1914, and has been accredited by the American Bar Association (ABA) since 1925. In the 2023 rankings, U.S. News & World Report ranked Idaho Law at #142 of ABA-accredited law schools in its annual law school rankings.

The College of Law in fall of 2016 had an enrollment of around 300 students, with an entering first-year class of 97 students. As a public law school, new students hail from across Idaho and 18 different states and foreign countries. They represent over 70 undergraduate colleges and universities.

The college offers four areas of emphasis: Native American Law, Natural Resources and Environmental Law, Business Law and Entrepreneurship, and Intellectual Property and Technology Law.

The college opened its Idaho Law and JusticexLearning Center in Boise in 2010, initially as a third-year program only. Second-year classes were added in 2014. The plans for a full three-year program in Boise, which UI had first discussed in the late 1990s and the state legislature had addressed in 2008, were fully realized in 2017 after the Idaho Board of Education and the ABA approved the addition of first-year courses at the Boise campus. The Boise campus initially accommodated about 35 students annually; with the expansion to a full three-year program, it can now accept up to 60 first-year students. UI's addition of the Boise campus has led the University of South Dakota to consider establishing a second law school campus in Sioux Falls.

The University of Idaho College of Law is the only law school in Idaho fully accredited by the ABA. A second accredited law school, the Concordia University School of Law, operated from 2019 to 2020.

According to Idaho Law's 2015 American Bar Association-required disclosures, 78.5% of the Class of 2015 obtained full-time, long-term, JD-required employment nine months after graduation. Moreover, 76% of 2018 graduates of the University of Idaho College of Law secured full-time, long-term employment.

== Admissions ==
For the 2020 incoming class, the 25th/75th percentile LSAT range was 150/155, and the GPA range was 2.84/3.55.

== Bar passage rate and job placement ==
According to Idaho Law's 2015 ABA-required disclosures, 78.5% of the Class of 2015 obtained full-time, long-term, JD-required employment nine months after graduation. UI College of Law's Law School Transparency under-employment score is 15.1%, indicating the percentage of the Class of 2015 unemployed, pursuing an additional degree, or working in a non-professional, short-term, or part-time job nine months after graduation.

In 2016, the University of Idaho College of Law was named the No. 8 best value law school in the country by preLaw Magazine. The college rose from being listed as an "A- Best Value School" on the annual list to breaking in the Top 10 in 2016. The rankings are based on the percentage of graduates who pass the bar, employment rates, tuition, cost of living, and average indebtedness upon graduation.

The Idaho bar examination passage rate for University of Idaho College of Law graduates was 81.7% of test takers on the July 2025 exam.

== Tuition and costs ==
Tuition and fees for Idaho residents were $18,664 per year for the 2016-17 academic year, while non-resident tuition was $33,472. The criteria for determining residency status and for acquiring residency status are established by law and are available on the University of Idaho website. Absence from the state to attend a post-secondary school elsewhere does not, by itself, result in loss of residency status.

The Law School Transparency estimated debt-financed cost of attendance for three years is $100,215 for residents and $152,777 for non-residents.

== Academics ==
=== Curriculum ===
The curriculum is based on traditional law courses and includes pro bono work (law-related public service), several legal clinics, externships with either federal or state courts, internships with private law firms or public organizations, and a semester-in-practice program offered, in addition to the third-year program, in the state capital, Boise. The curriculum is comprehensive; it includes emphases in Natural Resources & Environmental Law and in Native American Law, and in Business Law & Entrepreneurism.

=== Facility ===
The current law school building opened in the fall of 1973, and was named in 1984 for former dean Albert R. Menard, Jr. (1918–93). While he was dean (1967–78), enrollment (and faculty) tripled and the new building was conceived and constructed. The college was formerly housed in the south wing of the Administration Building. Menard stepped down as dean in 1978 and taught for six additional years until his retirement.

The Boise location was in the Idaho Law and Justice Learning Center (ILJLC). The Idaho Law and Justice Learning Center (ILJLC) is a collaborative effort between the University of Idaho College of Law and the Idaho Supreme Court to create a center for legal education and civic engagement. The Idaho Law and Justice Learning Center, formerly the Ada County Courthouse, was constructed as part of the Depression-era Public Works Administration in 1939. It was placed on the National Register of Historic Places in 1974. The building was constructed in the Art Deco style. Modern style and solid construction were intended to communicate confidence in the government and a positive outlook for the future at a difficult time in US history.

In January 2022, the Boise location moved into the former Concordia University Law School at 501 Front Street.

== Scholarly publications ==
The University of Idaho College of Law currently publishes two legal journals:

- Idaho Critical Legal Studies Journal
- Idaho Law Review

== See also ==
- List of University of Idaho College of Law alumni
