= Budge House =

Budge House may refer to the following historic houses in Paris, Idaho

- Alfred Budge House
- Julia Budge House
- Budge Cottage
- Taft Budge Bungalow
