= List of justices of the Idaho Supreme Court =

Following is a list of justices of the Idaho Supreme Court. Idaho was made a territory on March 4, 1863, and the first justices of the Territorial Supreme Court were appointed by President Abraham Lincoln. Following statehood in 1890, the state constitution provided for three justices. By an amendment in 1919, the number was increased and fixed at five, composed of a chief justice and four associate justices, which commenced in January 1921 and remains the present size of the court.

The first female justice on the court was Linda Copple Trout, she was first appointed in 1992 and later served as chief justice. Cathy Silak was appointed the following year and was elected to the court in 1994, being the first woman to be elected to Idaho Supreme Court (Trout ran unopposed in 1996). Silak served through 2000, suffering the only election defeat for an incumbent on the court since 1944. Following the retirement of Trout in 2007, the court was all-male until the election of Robyn Brody in November 2016. With the appointment of Colleen Zahn in 2021 and Cynthia Meyer in 2023, the court currently has a female majority.

== Idaho Territorial Court ==
Chief justices of the Idaho Territorial Court

- Sidney Edgerton (March 10, 1863 – July 25, 1864)
- Silas Woodson (July 25, 1864 – February 28, 1865)
- John R. McBride (February 28, 1865 – July 18, 1868)
- Thomas J. Bowers (July 18, 1868 – April 9, 1869)
- David Noggle (April 9, 1869 – January 14, 1875)
- M. E. Hollister (January 14, 1875 – January 13, 1879)
- William George Thompson (January 13, 1879 – June 10, 1879)
- John T. Morgan (June 10, 1879 – August 14, 1885)
- James B. Hays (August 14, 1885 – September 29, 1888)
- Hugh W. Weir (September 29, 1888 – May 1889)
- James H. Beatty (May 1889 – July 3, 1890)

== State supreme court ==
Justice	Seat	Began	Ended	Chief Justice	Law School
Isaac Sullivan	1	1891	1917	CJ 1891–92; 1899–1900; 1905–06; 1909–10	
Joseph Huston	2	1891	1901	CJ 1893–94	
John Morgan	3	1891	1896	CJ 1895–96	
Ralph Quarles	3	1897	1903	CJ 1897–98	
Charles Stockslager	2	1901	1907	CJ 1901–02	
James Ailshie	3; 1	1903; 1935	1914; 1947	CJ 1903–04; 1907–08; 1913–14; 1939–41; 1945–46	Willamette University College of Law, 1891
George Stewart	2	1907	1914	CJ 1911–12	North Indiana Law School, 1881
Warren Truitt	3	1914	1915	.	
Alfred Budge	2	1914	1949	CJ	University of Michigan Law School, 1890
William Morgan	3	1915; 1933	1920; 1942	CJ 1919–20	Georgetown University Law Center, 1899
John Rice	1	1917	1923	CJ	Cornell Law School, 1890
Robert Dunn	3	1921	1925	CJ 1924-1925	University of Central Missouri, 1880
Charles McCarthy	4	1921	1925		Harvard Law School, 1902
William A. Lee	5	1921	1926	CJ	Washington University School of Law, 1885
William E. Lee	1	1923	1930	CJ 1926–29	National University School of Law, 1906
Raymond Givens	4	1925	1955	CJ 1930–31	
Herman Taylor	3	1925	1929		University of Wisconsin Law School, 1902
T. Bailey Lee	5	1926	1933	CJ 1931–32	University of North Carolina School of Law, 189x
Bertram Varian	3	1929	1933		
William McNaughton	1	1930	1931		
Robert Leeper	1	1932	1932		University of Idaho College of Law, 1913
Edwin Holden	5	1933	1950	CJ	
Nicodemus D. Wernette	1	1933	1935		University of Michigan, 1907
S. Ben Dunlap	3	1942	1945 ^		
Bert Miller	3	1945	1948		Cumberland School of Law, 1902
Paul Hyatt	1	1947	1949		University of Idaho, 1927
James Porter	2	1949	1959	CJ	Drake University Law School, 1910
William Keeton	1	1949	1959	CJ	University of Michigan, 1908
Clarence Taylor	3	1949	1969	CJ	University of Idaho, 1919
Darwin Thomas	5	1950	1954		University of Idaho, 1925
E. B. Smith	5	1954	1968	CJ 196x–63	University of Idaho, 1919
Donald Anderson	4	1955	1956		University of Idaho, 1927
Henry McQuade	4	1956	1976	CJ	University of Idaho, 1943
Emery Knudson	1	1959	1965	CJ 1963–65	University of Idaho, 1921
Joseph McFadden	2	1959	1982	CJ	University of Idaho, 1940 (est.)
Clay Spear	1	1966	1971		University of Idaho, 1936
Charles Donaldson	3	1969	1987	CJ 1983–87	University of Idaho, 1948
Allan Shepard	5	1969	1989	CJ 1987–89	University of Washington School of Law, 1951
Robert Bakes	1	1971	1993	CJ 198x–83; 1989–93	University of Idaho, 1956
Stephen Bistline	4	1976	1994		University of Idaho, 1949
Robert Huntley	2	1982	1989		University of Idaho, 1959
Byron Johnson	3	1988	1999		Harvard University, 1962
Larry Boyle	2	1989	1992		University of Idaho, 1972
Charles McDevitt	5	1989	1997	CJ 1993–97	University of Idaho, 1956
Linda Copple Trout	2	1992	2007	CJ 1997–2004	University of Idaho, 1977
Cathy Silak	1	1993	2000 ^		UC Berkeley School of Law, 1976
Gerald Schroeder	4	1995	2007	CJ 2004–07	Harvard University, 1964
Jesse Walters	5	1997	2003		University of Idaho, 1963
Wayne Kidwell	3	1999	2005		University of Idaho, 1964
Dan Eismann	1	2001	2017	CJ 2007–11	University of Idaho, 1976
Roger Burdick	5	2003	2021	CJ 2011–15; 2017–20	University of Idaho, 1974
Jim Jones	3	2005	2017	CJ 2015–17	Northwestern University School of Law, 1967
Warren Jones	4	2007	2017		University of Chicago Law School, 1968
Joel Horton	2	2007	2018		University of Idaho, 1985
Robyn Brody	3	2017	Incumbent	CJ 2026–present	Sturm College of Law, 1997
Richard Bevan	1	2017	2026	CJ 2021–26	J. Reuben Clark Law School, 1987
John Stegner	4	2018	2023		University of Idaho, 1982
Gregory Moeller	2	2019	Incumbent		Brigham Young University, 1990
Colleen Zahn	5	2021	Incumbent		University of Idaho, 2000
Cynthia Meyer	4	2023	Incumbent		S.J. Quinney College of Law, 1987
Jason Scott	1	2026	Incumbent		Duke University School of Law, 1997

- Beginning in 1983, the Chief Justice was determined by an election among the five justices of the court.
  Previously the position rotated to the justice with the least amount of time remaining in his term.

^ defeated in statewide election: Dunlap (1944), Silak (2000)
