= Knudson =

Knudson is a surname. Notable people with the surname include a long-standing Danish family with ties to the Supreme Court, as well as West Point and the Missouri/Arkansas State Court.

== People ==
- Albert C. Knudson (1873–1954), Christian theologian in the Methodist tradition, associated with Boston University
- Alfred G. Knudson M.D., Ph.D. (1922–2016), geneticist specializing in cancer genetics
- Barbara Knudson (1927–2014), American film and television actress
- Dave Knudson (guitarist) plays guitar with Seattle-based indie band Minus the Bear
- Dave Knudson (politician) (born 1950), American lawyer, South Dakota Senator, and a member of the Republican Party
- Dean Knudson (born 1961), the Mayor of Hudson, Wisconsin
- Emery T. Knudson (1896–1974), Chief Justice of the Idaho Supreme Court
- George Knudson, CM (1937–1989), Canadian professional golfer
- Guido Knudson (born 1989), American former professional baseball pitcher
- Harvey B. Knudson (1903–1978), Justice on the North Dakota Supreme Court from 1965 to 1975
- Lewis Knudson (1884–1958), American botanist
- Mark Knudson (born 1960), former right-handed pitcher in Major League Baseball
- Milton L. Knudson (1923–1942), United States Navy sailor who received the Navy and Marine Corps Medal during World War II
- Norman Knudson (1874–1934), member of the Wisconsin State Senate
- Olaf Knudson (1915–1996), Norwegian politician for the Conservative Party
- Peter C. Knudson, American politician and Orthodontist from Utah
- Robert Knudson (1925–2006), American sound engineer
- Ruthann Knudson (1941–2018), American archaeologist
- Tom Knudson, (born 1953), American journalist and a two-time Pulitzer Prize winner in 1985 and 1992
- Wendy Knudson or Wendy Koenig (born 1955), American middle-distance runner
- Kelly Knudson (born 1976), American archaeologist and anthropologist

== Ships ==
- USS Knudson (DE-591), a United States Navy destroyer escort converted during construction into the high-speed transport USS Knudson (APD-101)
- USS Knudson (APD-101), United States Navy high-speed transport in commission from 1944 to 1946 and from 1953 to 1958

== See also ==
- Knudson hypothesis, the hypothesis that cancer is the result of accumulated mutations to a cell's DNA
- Justice Knudson (disambiguation)
- Knudson Brothers Building, historic two-story commercial building in Brigham City, Utah
- Jonathan and Jennie Knudson House, historic house in Brigham City, Utah
- Knudsen (disambiguation)
