= James H. Beatty =

American judge (1836–1927)

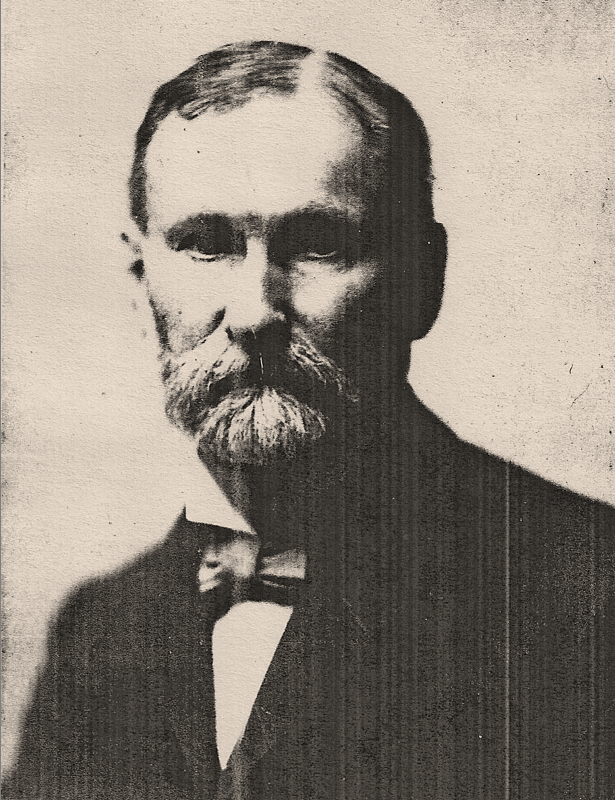

Judge of the United States District Court for the District of Idaho
- In office March 7, 1891 – March 1, 1907
- Appointed by: Benjamin Harrison
- Preceded by: Seat established by 26 Stat. 215
- Succeeded by: Frank Sigel Dietrich

Chief Justice of the Idaho Territorial Supreme Court
- In office November 21, 1889 – October 1890
- Appointed by: Benjamin Harrison
- Preceded by: Hugh W. Weir
- Succeeded by: Seat abolished

Delegate to the Idaho Constitutional Convention
- In office July 4, 1889 – August 6, 1889
- Constituency: Alturas County

Member of the Idaho Territorial Council
- In office 1886–1887
- Constituency: Alturas County

Personal details
- Born: James Helmick Beatty; May 8, 1836 Lancaster, Ohio, US
- Died: October 21, 1927 (aged 91) Hollywood, California, US
- Resting place: Hollywood Forever Cemetery
- Party: Republican
- Spouse: Mary J. Caldwell (m. 1870)
- Education: Ohio Wesleyan University (A.B.) read law
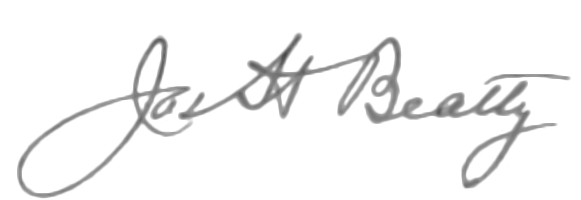
- Signature

Military service
- Allegiance: United States
- Branch/service: United States Army
- Years of service: 1863–1865
- Rank: First lieutenant
- Unit: Fourth Iowa Battery
- Battles/wars: American Civil War

James Helmick Beatty (May 8, 1836 – October 21, 1927) was a politician and jurist who served as United States district judge of the United States District Court for the District of Idaho.

== Education and career ==
Born in Lancaster, Ohio, Beatty received an Artium Baccalaureus degree from Ohio Wesleyan University in 1858 and read law to enter the bar in 1862. He was superintendent of Jackson Public Schools in Jackson, Mississippi, from 1858 to 1861, and was in the United States Army during the American Civil War, serving as first lieutenant of the Fourth Iowa Battery from 1863 to 1865. Beatty married Mary J. Caldwell, of Hamilton, Ohio, on December 13, 1870. She would go on to be a suffragette, and, as president of the Boise Equal Suffrage Club, hosted the Idaho state suffrage convention at their residence in 1895.

Following the war, Beatty was in private practice in Missouri at Lexington from 1865 to 1872, also serving as a register in bankruptcy during that time. He was an Assistant United States Attorney in Salt Lake City, Utah Territory, from 1872 to 1882. Beatty returned to private practice in the Idaho Territory from 1882 to 1889 at Hailey, and in 1886 was elected as a Republican to the Idaho Territorial Council, representing Alturas County. Beatty served as a delegate to the Idaho Constitutional Convention for Alturas County in 1889. On November 21, 1889, Beatty received a recess appointment from President Benjamin Harrison as Chief Justice of the Idaho Territorial Supreme Court. He was formally nominated by Harrison on December 16, 1889, and confirmed by the senate on January 16, 1890. Following Idaho's statehood, per the Idaho Constitution, he remained in office until the state's supreme court justices were elected in October 1890.

== Federal judicial service ==
Beatty was nominated to the United States District Court for the District of Idaho on February 10, 1891, but the United States Senate never voted on his nomination, which expired with the sine die adjournment of the Senate on March 3, 1891.

Beatty received another recess appointment from President Harrison on March 7, 1891, to the United States District Court for the District of Idaho, to a new seat authorized by 26 Stat. 215. He was nominated to the same position by President Harrison on December 10, 1891. He was confirmed by the United States Senate on February 4, 1892, and received his commission the same day. His service terminated on March 1, 1907, due to his retirement.

=== Opposition ===
Beatty's appointment was originally held up by Idaho's two United States Senators, William J. McConnell and George L. Shoup, leading to the failure of his first nomination and a delay in confirmation on his second nomination, but ultimately they abandoned their efforts to stop his appointment.

== Death ==
Beatty lived another twenty years and died at age 91, on October 21, 1927, in Hollywood, California.

== Sources ==
Legal offices
Preceded by Seat established by 26 Stat. 215	Judge of the United States District Court for the District of Idaho; 1891–1907	Succeeded by Frank Sigel Dietrich
