= Justice McFadden =

Justice McFadden may refer to:

- Joseph J. McFadden (1916–1991), associate justice of the Idaho Supreme Court
- Obadiah B. McFadden (1815–1875), associate justice of the Oregon Supreme Court

== See also ==
- Ed F. McFaddin (1894–1982), associate justice of the Arkansas Supreme Court
