= Wernette =

Wernette is a surname. Notable people with the surname include:

- John Philip Wernette (1903–1988), American academic
- Nicodemus D. Wernette (1885–1956), American judge
