= Charles P. McCarthy =

American judge (c. 1881–1950)

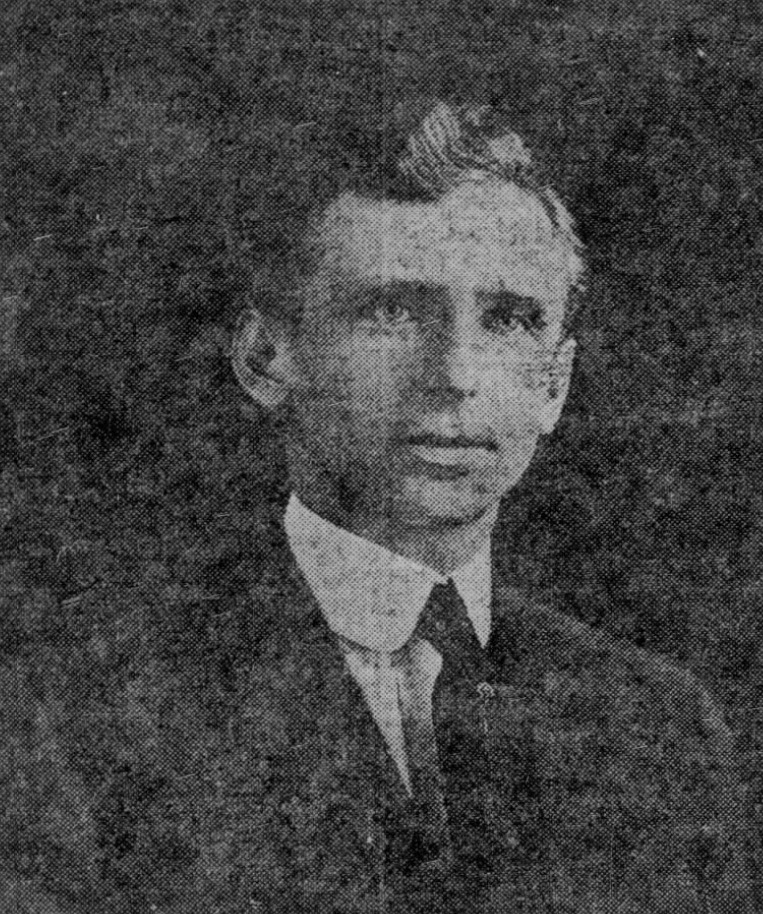
Judge Charles P. McCarthy in 1912

Charles P. McCarthy (1881 – February 4, 1950) was an Idaho lawyer and judge who served as a justice of the Idaho Supreme Court from 1921 to 1925, serving as chief justice for the final year of his tenure.

== Early life, education, and career ==
Born in Boston, Massachusetts, McCarthy received an A.B. from Harvard University, and graduating from Harvard Law School in 1902. After briefly practicing law in Massachusetts, he moved to Idaho in 1905, there becoming a partner in the law office of William Borah.

McCarthy became an acting city attorney, and the prosecuting attorney of Ada County, and also practiced law in Boise for seven years.

== Judicial service ==
In January 1912, Governor James H. Hawley appointed McCarthy to a seat on the Idaho Third District Court vacated by the resignation of Judge John F. Maclane. McCarthy took the oath of office and began undertaking his duties two weeks thereafter. He was one of the youngest people ever appointed to that office. In 1913, McCarthy built a new house, which would come to be known as the Judge Charles P. McCarthy House, having a "design inspired by plans sold by Frank Lloyd Wright". McCarthy was re-elected to the Third Circuit seat in 1914, and again in 1918.

On July 31, 1920, McCarthy announced his candidacy for one of two new seats on the state supreme court that would be created pending passage of a constitutional amendment up for approval in the same election. At the state's Republican Party convention later that month, he was unanimously endorsed for the party's nomination for the seat, and won in the general election in November, along with the rest of the Republican state ticket.

On January 2, 1924, McCarthy became chief justice of the Idaho Supreme Court. In June 1924, McCarthy announced that he would not be a candidate for reelection to the court, and would instead retire to private law practice following the end of his term on January 1, 1925.

Within a few months of his retirement from the court, he was hired by the public utilities commission as special counsel defending against a federal lawsuit brought by the Idaho Power company. In August 1929, McCarthy announced that he would be moving to Los Angeles, California, to join the law firm of Hill Morgan and Bledsoe there. McCarthy spent the rest of his life in Los Angeles.

== Personal life and death ==
On September 29, 1909, McCarthy married Ethel Stewart, the daughter of state supreme court justice George H. Stewart. They had five daughters.

McCarthy died in Los Angeles at the age of 68, "following an operation at the Good Samaritan Hospital".

Political offices
Preceded by Newly established seat	Justice of the Idaho Supreme Court; 1921–1925	Succeeded by Raymond L. Givens
