= Robert N. Dunn =

American judge (1858–1925)

Chief Justice of the Idaho Supreme Court
- In office January 5, 1924 – January 17, 1925
- Governor: Charles C. Moore
- Preceded by: William McKendree Morgan
- Succeeded by: Herman H. Taylor

Personal details
- Born: Robert Newton Dunn; March 10, 1858 Warsaw, Missouri, US
- Died: January 17, 1925 (aged 66) Boise, Idaho, US
- Party: Republican
- Spouse: Ella C. Christopher

Robert Newton Dunn (March 10, 1858 – January 17, 1925) was Justice of the Idaho Supreme Court from 1921 to 1925, serving as chief justice from January 5, 1924, until his death in 1925.

== Biography ==
Robert N. Dunn was born on March 10, 1858, in Warsaw, Missouri, as the son of John H. Dunn and Elizabeth Catherine Lay. Following the high school, he worked as a Printer in Warrensburg, Missouri, and entered the local State Normal School (later known as Warrensburg Teachers College - predecessor of nowadays University of Central Missouri). Dunn graduated from the Advanced course in 1880 and moved to Idaho with his two brothers, John and Alfred. He settled in Wallace, Idaho, and worked as a Postmaster, while helping his brothers to establish a local newspaper, the "Wallace Free Press".

He became an acquaintance of Judge Weldon B. Heyburn who partnered with Dunn brothers during the establishment of the "Wallace Free Press" and was appointed by Heyburn to the Idaho State Committee as a representative for Shoshone County in August 1898. Dunn also began practicing the law and was selected for a practice at the Interior Department in Washington, D.C., in January 1901.

In June 1902, Dunn unsuccessfully ran for office of Registrar of the Land office in Coeur d'Alene, Idaho, but few weeks later he decided to ran for the office of the Shoshone County Attorney and was appointed in October that year. However in late May 1904, Judge David H. Budlong who served as Registrar of the Land office in Coeur d'Alene, was forced to resign due to ill health and Dunn replaced him shortly afterwards. His older son Charles received an appointment to the United States Naval Academy from now-Governor Weldon B. Heyburn in summer 1903.

Dunn became a member of the Republican Party and ran for the Judge in the First Judicial District but he lost to Democrat William W. Wood. Dunn continued as the Register of the Coeur d'Alene Land Office and was reappointed in December 1908.

Following the reorganization of the Idaho Judicial Districts, Dunn ran again for the Judge in the new Eight comprising Kootenai and Bonner Counties and defeated Democrat John M. Flynn. Dunn was successfully re-elected one year later, when he defeated Ralph T. Morgan.

Dunn was a candidate for the United States Senate in the 1913 United States Senate election, but only received four votes in the Idaho legislature. He continued as a Judge in the First Judicial District and ran unsuccessfully for the Justice of the Idaho Supreme Court in 1916. His oldest brother John committed suicide with gunshot to the head in October 1917.

He ran again for the Justice of the Idaho Supreme Court in 1920 and won an appointment in January 1921. Dunn was appointed Chief Justice of the Idaho Supreme Court on January 5, 1924, and served in this capacity until his death on January 17, 1925. Robert N. Dunn died at his home in Boise, Idaho, at the age of 66 following a long illness related to the complications from Carcinoma of stomach, liver, kidney and prostate.

Following his death, Idaho Governor Charles C. Moore paid tribute to Dunn, ordered flags to be at half-mast all over the state and described him as an able jurist and citizen of sterling qualities. Robert N. Dunn was buried at Morris Hill Cemetery in Boise, Idaho. Dunn and his wife Ella Christopher Dunn had a daughter Elizabeth and sons Charles and Jack. His older son Charles A. Dunn attended the United States Naval Academy and reached the rank of Rear admiral in the Navy during World War II. The younger son Jack served as Corporal with the American Expeditionary Force in France during World War I.

Political offices
Preceded by William McKendree Morgan	Justice of the Idaho Supreme Court; 1921–1925	Succeeded by Herman H. Taylor
