= Joseph McFadden =

Joseph McFadden may refer to:

- Joe McFadden (born 1975), Scottish actor
- Joseph J. McFadden (1916–1991), American judge
- Joseph P. McFadden (1947–2013), American bishop
