= Clarence Taylor (disambiguation) =

Clarence Taylor is an American history professor and author. Clarence Taylor may also refer to:

- Clarence D. Taylor, one of many pen names of J. Mallorquí (1913–1972), prolific Spanish writer
- Clarence J. Taylor (1894–1988), chief justice of the Idaho Supreme Court
- Clarence Gilbert Taylor (1898–1988), early aviation entrepreneur and co-founder of the Taylor Brothers Aircraft Corporation
- Clarence Taylor (triple jumper) (born 1952), American triple jumper, 1975 NCAA 3rd-place finisher for the UCLA Bruins track and field team
