= William Budge =

American politician

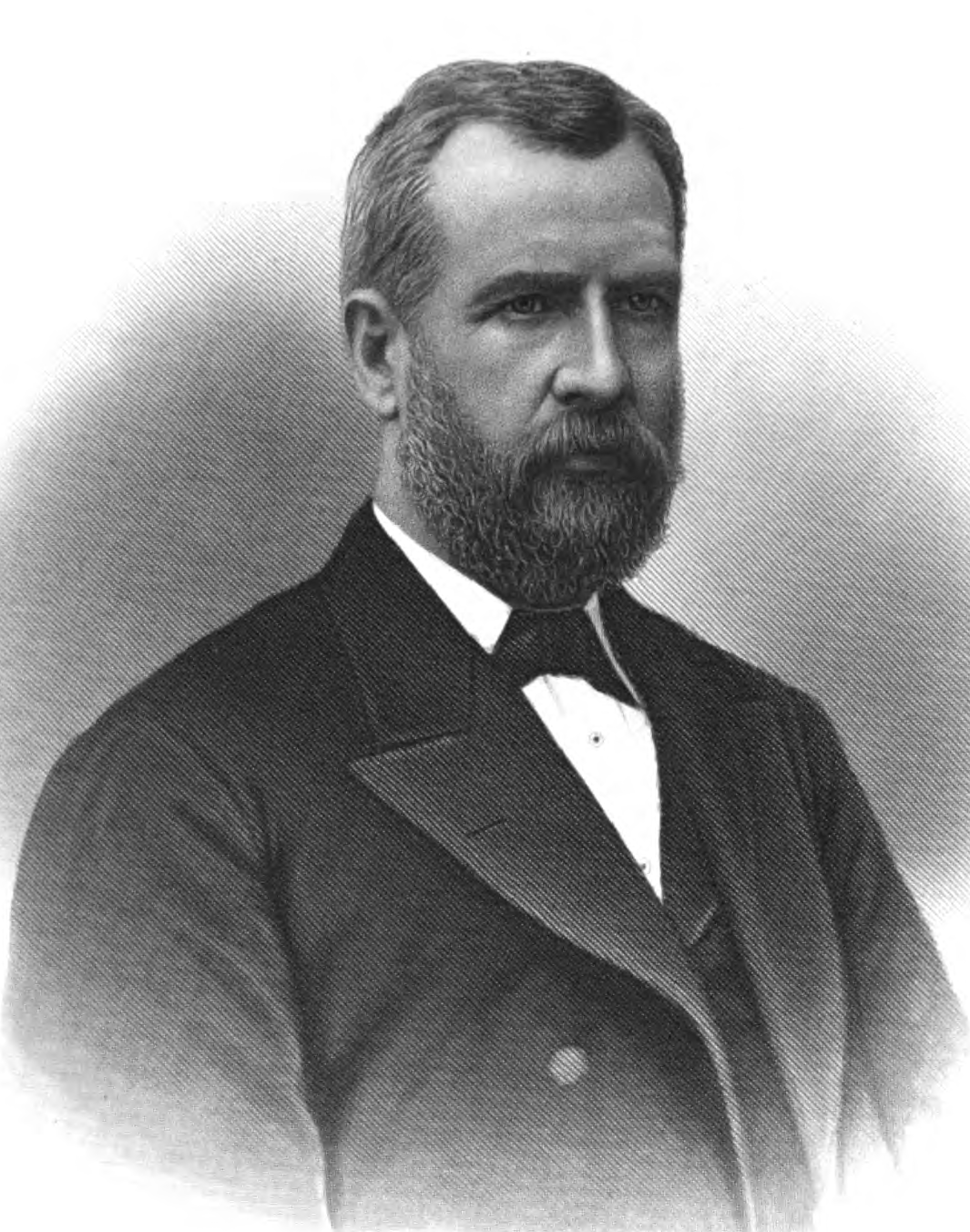

Member of the Idaho Senate
- In office 1899–1901
- Constituency: Bear Lake County

Member of the Idaho Territorial Council
- In office 1876–1877
- In office 1880–1881
- Constituency: Bear Lake County

Personal details
- Born: May 1, 1828 Lanark, Scotland
- Died: March 18, 1919 (aged 90) Logan, Utah, United States
- Resting place: Logan City Cemetery; 41.749°N 111.806°W
- Party: Democratic
- Spouse(s): Julia Stratford; Eliza Pritchford; Ann Hyer
- Children: 36
- Parent(s): William Budge; Mary Scott
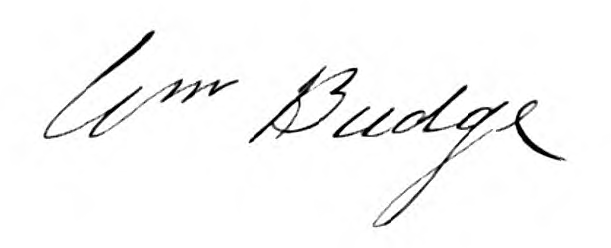
- Signature

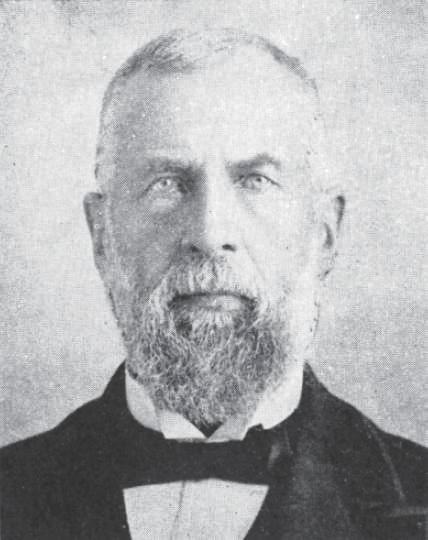
Budge, c. 1900

William Budge (May 1, 1828 – March 18, 1919) was a member of the Council of Fifty as well as the Idaho Legislature and was a mission president and stake president in the Church of Jesus Christ of Latter-day Saints.

Budge was born in Lanark, Scotland and moved in his teen years to Glasgow for employment. At the age of 20 he joined the LDS Church. He became a missionary in 1851 and continued in that position until about 1860. During these years Budge served for a time as president of the Swiss Mission, as district president in Glasgow and five different districts in England, and also preached the gospel in Italy and Germany. Among other assignments, in 1855 the president of the European Mission Franklin D. Richards sent Budge to Saxony to respond to inquires about the LDS Church from Karl G. Maeser.

In 1860 Budge emigrated to Utah Territory. He was the captain of a company of seventy-two wagons from Winter Quarters to Salt Lake City. He lived in Farmington where he was Justice of the Peace. He moved to Cache Valley in 1864 at the request of Brigham Young. He later moved to Bear Lake County, Idaho. From 1878 to 1880 Budge was president of the European Mission, and in 1877 as well as in 1870 to 1906 he served as president of the Bear Lake Stake. From 1906 to 1918 Budge was the president of the LDS Church's Logan Utah Temple.

Budge was an active public servant, and was elected as the local superintendent of schools in 1872. After losing a race for the Idaho Territorial Council from Bear Lake County in 1874, he won elections to the same position as a Democrat in 1876 and 1880. He also won the corresponding post-statehood position, a member of the state senate, in 1898.

One of the Helaman Halls at Brigham Young University is named for Budge. Budge was the missionary who helped convert Karl G. Maeser.

With his second wife, Eliza Pritchert, Budge was the father of Alfred Budge, who served as a justice of the Idaho Supreme Court.

== See also ==
- Julia Budge House
