= Justice Knudson =

Justice Knudson may refer to:

- Emery T. Knudson (1896–1974), associate justice of the Idaho Supreme Court
- Harvey B. Knudson (1903–1978), associate justice of the North Dakota Supreme Court
- Oscar Knutson (1899–1981), associate justice and chief justice of the Minnesota Supreme Court
