= William D. Keeton =

American judge (1884–1972)

William D. Keeton (December 2, 1884 – May 28, 1972) was chief justice of the Idaho Supreme Court from 1949 to 1959. He received his J.D. from the University of Michigan Law School in 1908.

On March 30, 1949, Governor C. A. Robins appointed Keeton to the Idaho Supreme Court.

Keeton entered the practice of law in St. Maries, Idaho, in 1912. In 1922, he was elected to the Idaho state legislature, serving one term. He was Benewah County attorney for fourteen years and city attorney for St. Maries for six years.

With his wife, Ruth, he had four daughters. Keeton died in a nursing home in Boise, Idaho, at the age of 87.

Political offices
Preceded by Paul W. Hyatt	Justice of the Idaho Supreme Court; 1949–1959	Succeeded by Emery T. Knudson
