= William P. Lyon =

American politician and Union Army general (1822–1913)

The Honorable William P. Lyon
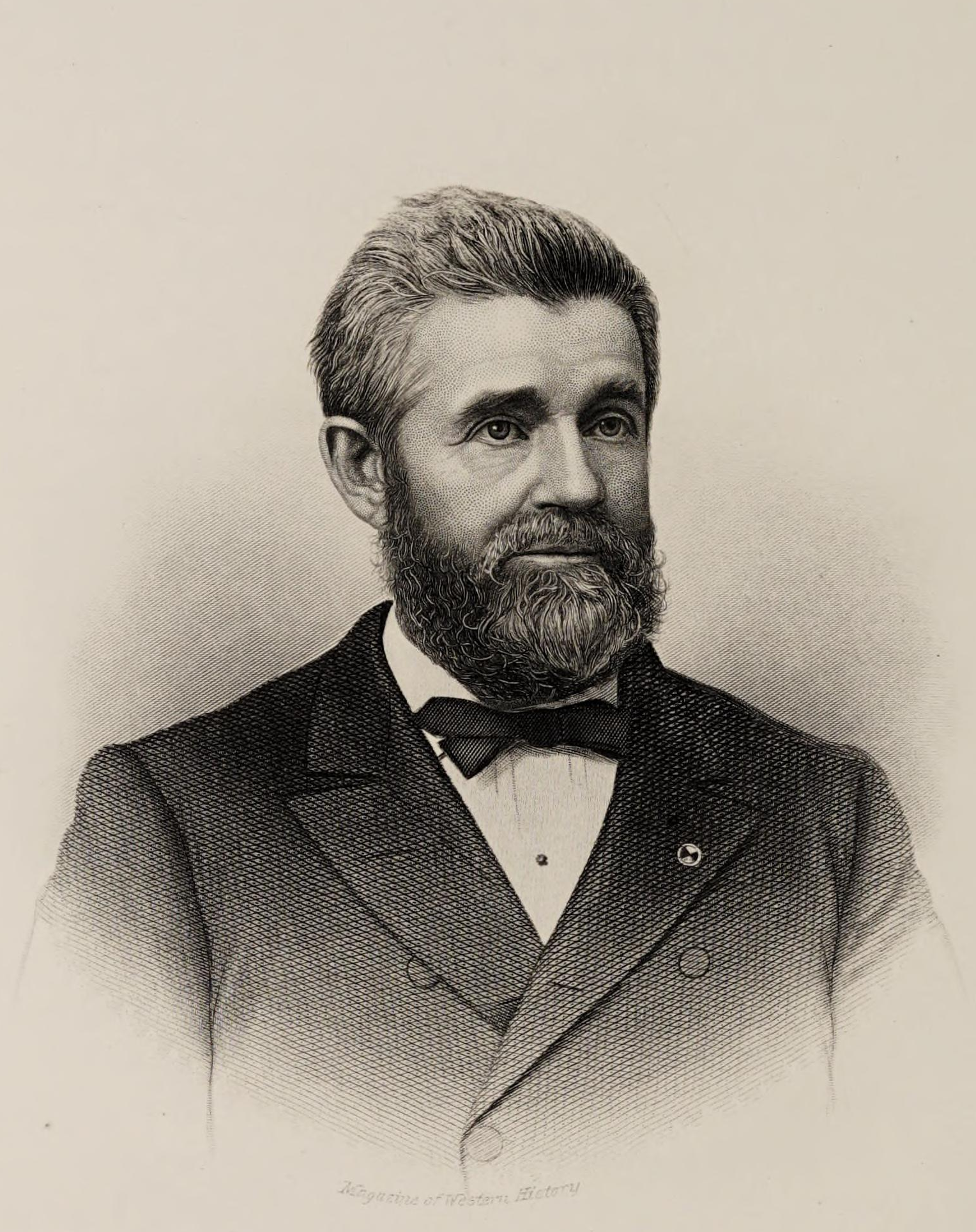

7th Chief Justice of the Wisconsin Supreme Court
- In office January 4, 1892 – January 1, 1894
- Preceded by: Orsamus Cole
- Succeeded by: Harlow S. Orton

Justice of the Wisconsin Supreme Court
- In office January 20, 1871 – January 1, 1894
- Appointed by: Lucius Fairchild
- Preceded by: Byron Paine
- Succeeded by: Alfred W. Newman

Wisconsin Circuit Court Judge for the 1st Circuit
- In office January 1, 1866 – January 20, 1871
- Preceded by: David Noggle
- Succeeded by: Robert Harkness

12th Speaker of the Wisconsin Assembly
- In office January 12, 1859 – January 9, 1861
- Preceded by: Frederick S. Lovell
- Succeeded by: Amasa Cobb

Member of the Wisconsin State Assembly from the Racine 1st district
- In office January 12, 1859 – January 9, 1861
- Preceded by: Hermon Warner
- Succeeded by: Gilbert Knapp

District Attorney of Racine County
- In office January 1, 1854 – January 1, 1858
- Preceded by: Lewis Royce
- Succeeded by: Champion S. Chase

Personal details
- Born: William Penn Lyon; October 28, 1822 Chatham, New York, U.S.
- Died: April 4, 1913 (aged 90) San Jose, California, U.S.
- Resting place: Oak Hill Memorial Park; San Jose, California
- Party: Republican
- Spouse: Adelia Caroline Duncombe (m. 1847; died 1910)
- Children: Clara I. (Hayes)^{(b. 1857; died 1932)}
- Profession: lawyer, judge
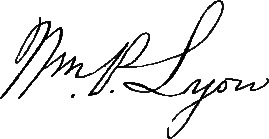
- Signature

Military service
- Allegiance: United States
- Branch/service: United States Army; Union Army
- Years of service: 1861–1865
- Rank: Colonel, USV; Brevet Brigadier General, USV
- Unit: 8th Reg. Wis. Vol. Infantry; Army of the Tennessee
- Commands: 13th Reg. Wis. Vol. Infantry
- Battles/wars: American Civil War: Operations to Control Missouri; Engagement at Fredericktown; Battle of Island Number Ten; Siege of Corinth; Battle of Iuka; Second Battle of Corinth; Vicksburg campaign; Battle of Jackson, Mississippi; Battle of Richmond, Louisiana; Siege of Vicksburg

William Penn Lyon (October 28, 1822 – April 4, 1913) was an American lawyer, politician, and judge who served as the 7th Chief Justice of the Wisconsin Supreme Court and the 12th Speaker of the Wisconsin State Assembly. He also served as a Union Army officer in the American Civil War.

== Early life and education ==
Born in Chatham, New York, Penn and his family moved, in 1841, to Walworth County, in the Wisconsin Territory, and settled on a farm near the present site of the town of Lyons. In 1844 he began studying law at the law offices of George Gale. In 1845, he continued his studies under Charles Minton Baker of Lake Geneva. And, in 1846, he was admitted to the State Bar of Wisconsin. He began practicing law near his family home and was appointed a justice of the peace. He married Adelia Caroline Duncombe in 1847. He moved in 1850 to Burlington and formed a law partnership in Racine County.

== Political career ==
In April 1855, Lyon was elected district attorney for Racine County, and he moved to the city of Racine that same year and took office January 1856. He was re-elected in 1856. In November 1858, Lyon was elected on the Republican ticket to represent Racine in the Wisconsin State Assembly for 1859.

Lyon was elected Speaker of the Assembly by the Republican majority on the first day of the session, January 12, 1859. He would go on to be re-elected to the Assembly for 1860, and was again elected Speaker for that session. He did not run for re-election in 1860.

== Civil War service ==
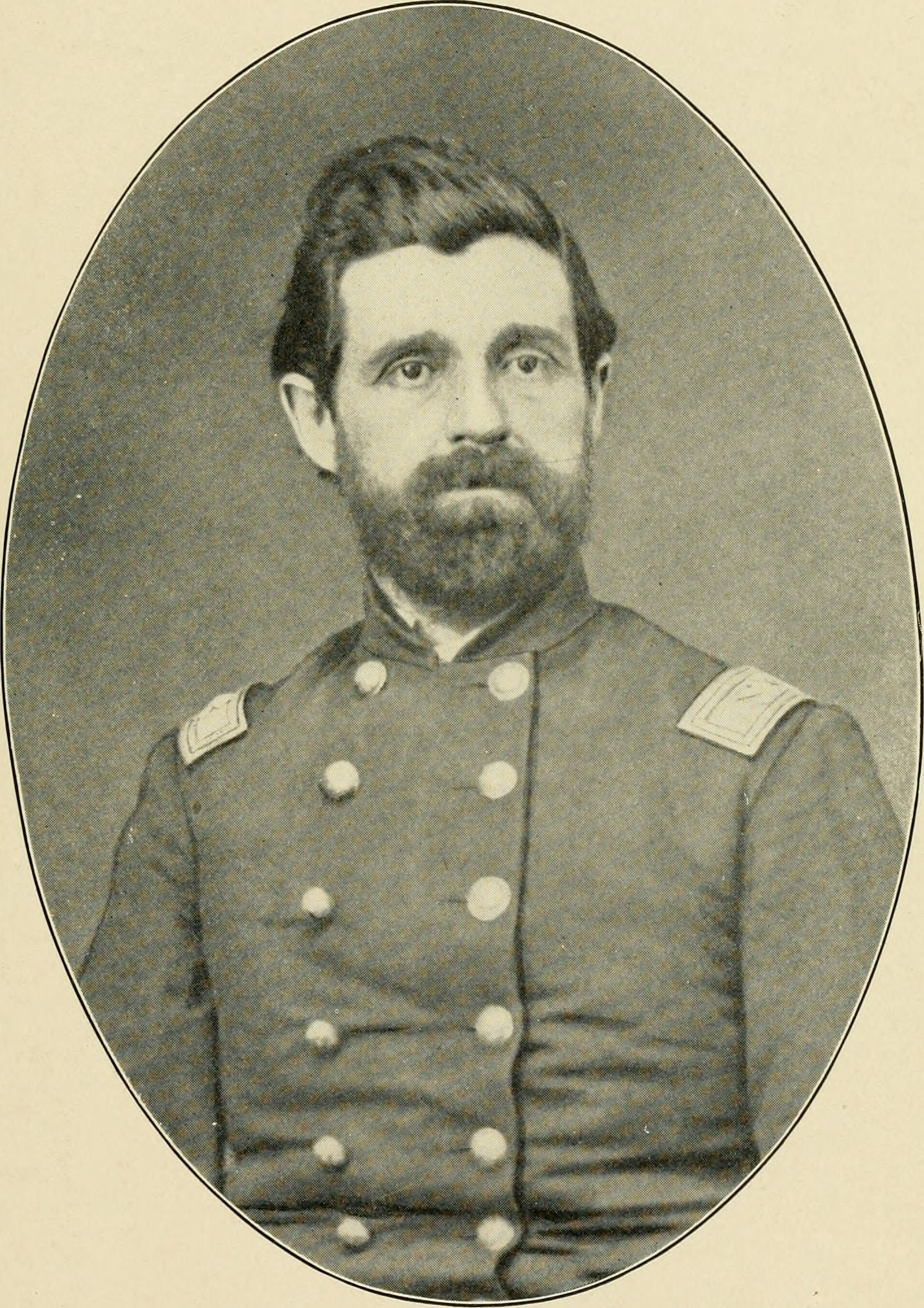
Colonel William P. Lyon

At the outbreak of the American Civil War, Lyon formed a company of volunteers in Racine County and was elected their Captain. Lyon's company became a component of the 8th Wisconsin Volunteer Infantry Regiment and mustered into service September 17, 1861.

The 8th Wisconsin was ordered to Missouri, in the Western Theater of the war, and attached to General Ulysses S. Grant's Army of the Tennessee. They participated in skirmishes along the Mississippi River to secure passage for Union forces south into Mississippi and Louisiana.

In August 1862, by order of Governor Edward Salomon, Lyon was made Colonel of the 13th Wisconsin Volunteer Infantry Regiment. The 13th Wisconsin saw very little combat, and was primarily tasked with securing trains and other logistics supplying frontline forces in the western theater.

At the end of the war, Colonel Lyon was given an honorary brevet to brigadier general.

== Early judicial career ==
In early 1865, while still serving with the 13th Wisconsin, Colonel Lyon was informed that he had been nominated for election to the Wisconsin Circuit Court. He won the election in April 1865 and began his service as Judge for the 1st Circuit in January 1866.

In 1870, Judge Lyon was the Republican nominee for Wisconsin's 1st congressional district, but was defeated by Democrat Alexander Mitchell.

== Wisconsin Supreme Court ==
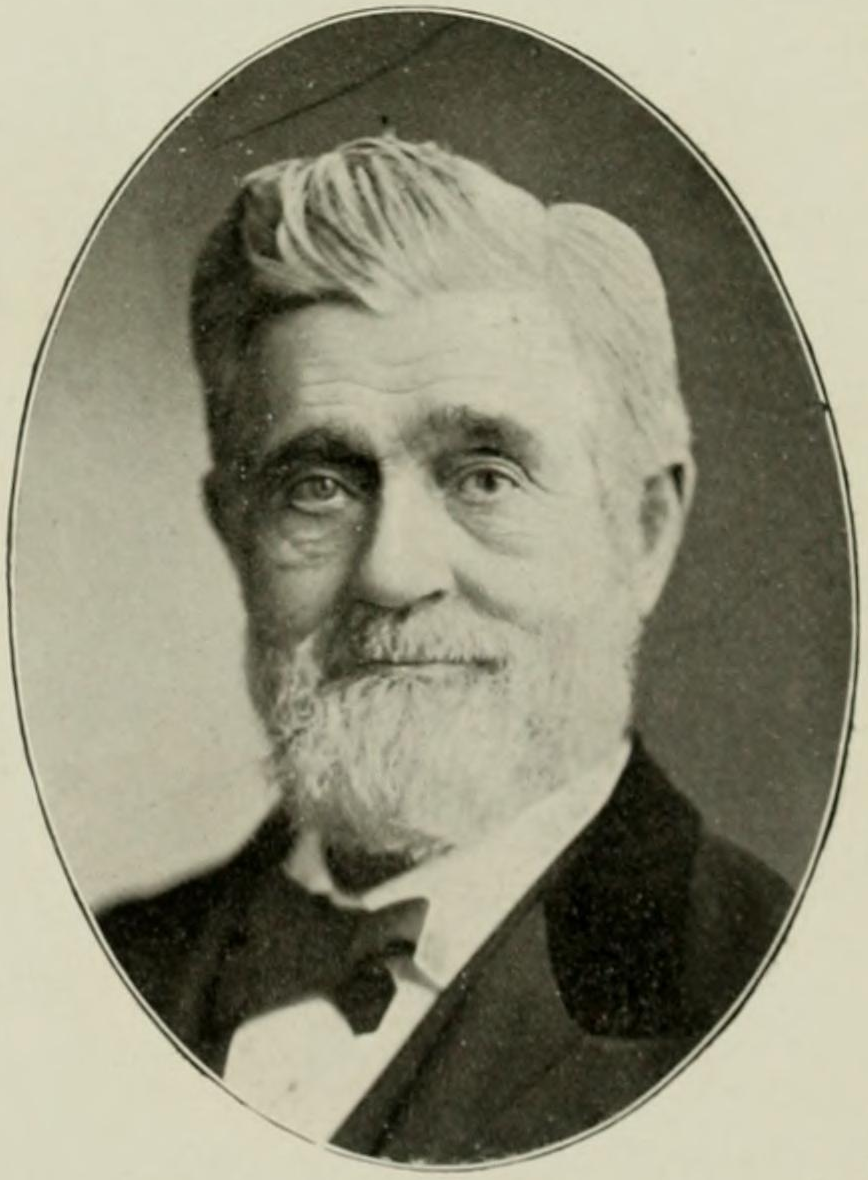
Chief Justice William P. Lyon

In January 1871, Wisconsin Supreme Court Justice Byron Paine died unexpectedly. Governor Lucius Fairchild appointed Judge Lyon to fill the vacancy, and, the following April, his appointment was confirmed in an election. Justice Lyon was re-elected in 1877 and 1883. After the retirement of Chief Justice Orasmus Cole at the end of his 6th term, in 1892, Justice Lyon, as the next most senior Justice, became the chief justice of the Wisconsin Supreme Court. Justice Lyon had already announced his intention to retire at the end of his term, however, so only served two years as chief justice.

=== Granger case ===
Following the 1873 elections, the state enacted the so-called "Potter Law"—named for Wisconsin state senator Robert L. D. Potter—officially, 1874 Wisconsin Act 273. The new law was a major priority of the Granger movement and effectively put railroad and freight prices under the control of a new state Railroad Commission. The railroads immediately challenged the law. In the 1874 case of Attorney General v. Chicago & Northwestern Railroad Company, Justice Lyon wrote with the majority that sustained the legislature's power over corporations operating within the state. For the Grangers, however, the victory was short-lived. In the 1875 election, they were defeated and the 1876 legislature stripped the Railroad Commission of much of its regulatory power.

=== Edgerton Bible Case ===
It had been a common practice in Edgerton, Wisconsin, for teachers in the public school to read passages from the King James Bible. In 1886, Roman Catholic parents complained to the school board about this practice, which they saw as teaching a sectarian and inaccurate version of the bible. The school board did not act on their complaint, so, in 1888, the parents sued in the Wisconsin Circuit Court. Judge John R. Bennett of the 12th Circuit ruled against the Catholic parents, so they appealed to the Supreme Court.

In the 1890 case of State ex rel. Weiss and others vs. District Board, etc., later referred to as the "Edgerton Bible Case", Justice Lyon wrote the unanimous opinion of the court that overturned the 12th Circuit opinion and ruled that the Edgerton public school practice was sectarian instruction and, therefore, violated Article X, Section 3 of the Wisconsin Constitution, which explicitly prohibits sectarian instruction in state public schools.

This was a significant case on the Separation of church and state in the United States, and, a century later, was cited in the opinion of Justice William J. Brennan Jr. in the landmark 1963 United States Supreme Court decision in Abington School District v. Schempp, which banned government-sponsored compulsory prayer from public schools.

=== Vosburg v. Putney ===
In 1889, 14-year-old Andrew Vosburg was kicked in the shin by 11-year-old George Putney. Putney was unaware that Vosburg had a previous knee injury, and the kick exacerbated the issue, resulting in severe infection. Vosburg became ill with vomiting and swelling of his leg with pus. He required two surgeries to drain the pus and remove degenerated bone tissue, leaving him with life-long weakness in his leg.

Vosburg and his family filed suit against Putney, alleging assault and battery. The 13th Circuit Court found in favor of the plaintiff and awarded $2,800 in damages. This decision was overturned by a ruling of the Wisconsin Supreme Court due to errors by the lower court Judge, A. Scott Sloan. The case was re-tried at the Circuit Court, and again found in favor of the plaintiff, this time awarded damages of $2,500 (approximately $71,000 adjusted for inflation to 2019).

The defendant again appealed to the Wisconsin Supreme Court. Justice Lyon wrote the opinion, which became a significant precedent for torts cases in the United States. The key findings were that:

1. Since the intended act was considered unlawful, the intention must also be considered unlawful.
2. Material omissions of fact in questions to an expert witness render the witness answer inadmissible.
3. The wrong-doer is liable for all damages resulting directly from the wrongful act, even if those damages could not be foreseen by the wrong-doer. Sometimes referred to as the Eggshell skull rule.

Because of the second finding, a new trial was again ordered. The third trial resulted in another appeal, and a fourth trial was eventually ordered. In all four trials, the jury found in favor of Vosburg.

== Later years ==
After his retirement from the Supreme Court, Justice Lyon was appointed to the State Board of Control of State Charitable, Penal, and Reformatory Institutions. He became President of that board in 1898, and served in that capacity until 1903, when he resigned to move to California, where his daughter resided.

He died at his daughter's home in the Edenvale neighborhood of San Jose, California on April 4, 1913, and was buried at Oak Hill Memorial Park.

Military offices
Preceded by Maurice Maloney	Command of the 13th Wisconsin Volunteer Infantry Regiment; 1862–1865	Succeeded by August Kummel
Wisconsin State Assembly
Preceded by Hermon Warner	Member of the Wisconsin State Assembly from the Racine 1st district 1859–1861	Succeeded by Gilbert Knapp
Preceded by Frederick S. Lovell	Speaker of the Wisconsin State Assembly; 1859–1861	Succeeded by Amasa Cobb
Legal offices
Preceded by Lewis Royce	District Attorney of Racine County, Wisconsin; 1854–1858	Succeeded by Champion S. Chase
Preceded by David Noggle	Wisconsin Circuit Court Judge for the 1st Circuit; 1866–1871	Succeeded by Robert Harkness
Preceded by Byron Paine	Justice of the Wisconsin Supreme Court; 1871–1894	Succeeded by Alfred W. Newman
Preceded by Orasmus Cole	Chief Justice of the Wisconsin Supreme Court; 1892–1894	Succeeded by Harlow S. Orton
