= M. E. Hollister =

American judge (1808–1896)

Chief Justice of the Idaho Territorial Supreme Court
- In office January 14, 1875 – late 1878
- Appointed by: Ulysses S. Grant
- Preceded by: David Noggle
- Succeeded by: William George Thompson

Associate Justice of the Idaho Territorial Supreme Court
- In office March 20, 1871 – January 14, 1875
- Appointed by: Ulysses S. Grant
- Preceded by: Joseph R. Lewis
- Succeeded by: John Clark

Personal details
- Born: February 13, 1808 Cato, New York, U.S.
- Died: December 15, 1896 (aged 88) Syracuse, New York, U.S.
- Party: Republican
- Spouse: Delia A. (m. 1832)
- Children: 2
- Parents: Abner Hollister (father); Polly Woodbridge (mother)
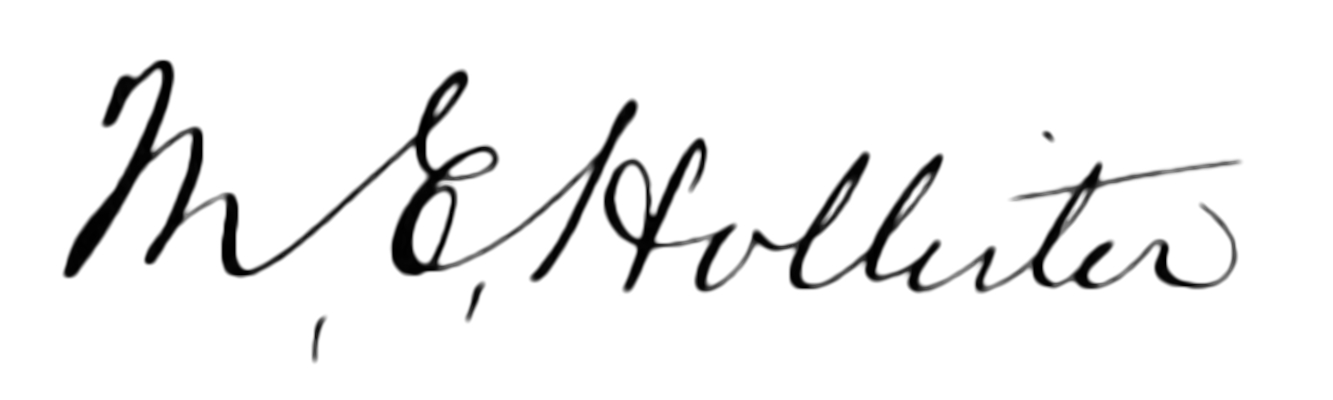
- Signature

Madison Elwell Hollister (February 13, 1808 – December 15, 1896) was an American jurist in Illinois and the Idaho Territory.

== Biography ==
Hollister was born on February 13, 1808, in Cato, New York, the son of Abner and Polly (née Woodbridge) Hollister. He and his wife Delia married in 1832, and had two sons. He was an early settler of Ottawa, Illinois, where he would practice law for many years. Hollister was part of the National Reform Association that sought an amendment to the U.S. Constitution to make it a Christian nation. He was a United States presidential elector for Illinois in 1848, the presiding judge of Bureau County, Illinois, from 1855 to 1860, and the judge of the Ninth Judicial District of Illinois from 1855 to 1861.

On March 16, 1871, President Ulysses S. Grant nominated Hollister as Associate Justice of the Idaho Territorial Supreme Court, and he was confirmed by the senate four days later. In 1874, Chief Justice David Noggle resigned, and on December 22, Grant nominated Hollister to succeed him. He was confirmed by the senate on January 14, 1875. Hollister resigned in late 1878, and retired to Maryland. He died in Syracuse, New York on December 15, 1896.

In 2014, a collection of Hollister's documents was auctioned including diaries from his times as U.S. Consul at Buenos Aires in the Argentine Republic and his travels on the Paraná River and Paraguay River. He was appointed to the post in 1866 by Andrew Johnson.

Political offices
Preceded by David Noggle	Justice of the Idaho Territorial Supreme Court; 1875–1878	Succeeded by William George Thompson
