= Hugh W. Weir =

American judge

Chief Justice of the Idaho Territorial Supreme Court
- In office July 19, 1888 – November 1889
- Appointed by: Grover Cleveland
- Preceded by: James B. Hays
- Succeeded by: James H. Beatty

Personal details
- Born: 1826 Indiana, Pennsylvania U.S.
- Died: February 8, 1893 (aged 67) Boise, Idaho, US
- Party: Democrat
- Spouse: Katherine A. Porter
- Children: Agnes Lenore (Baker), Edward Weir, Hugh Weir
- Education: Blairsville Academy
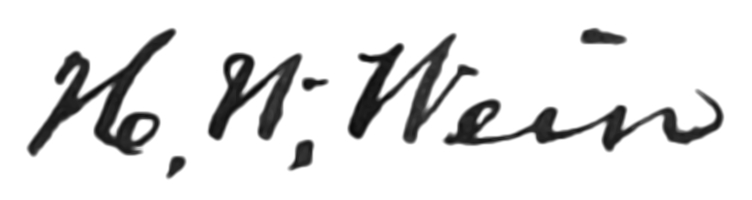
- Signature

Hugh W. Weir (1826 – February 8, 1893) was an American jurist who served as Chief Justice of the Idaho Territorial Supreme Court from 1888 to 1889.

== Early life and family ==
Weir was born in 1826 in Indiana, Pennsylvania, and he attended Blairsville Academy. He read law with Agustus Drum, and in 1852 he was admitted to practice law in Pennsylvania.

In 1849 Weir married Katherine A. Porter, and the marriage produced three children, Agnes Lenore (Baker), Edward Weir, and Hugh Weir.

== Career ==
Soon Weir and Drum formed a law partnership in Indiana, Weir later partnering with Robert M. Gibson in Pittsburgh in 1870 then with J.M. Garrison in 1884. A Democrat, Weir was active in local politics, and he ran unsuccessfully for Congress against John Covode in 1866.

President Cleveland nominated Weir to replace the late James B. Hays as Chief Justice of the Idaho Territorial Supreme Court on July 9, 1888, and the nomination was confirmed by the United States Senate on July 19, 1888. Weir had been nominated as Chief Justice of the Supreme Court of Utah Territory, but that appointment went to Elliott Sandford.

In 1889 Judge Weir wrote an opinion upholding the Idaho Territorial Legislature in its partition of Alturas County. Weir's political opponents, led by W.R. Riley of Hailey, the county seat, demanded that Weir be removed from office. President Harrison replaced Weir with James H. Beatty, a judge from Hailey, in November 1889.

== Death ==
After his time as chief justice, Weir formed a partnership with J.R. Wester, Weir & Wester, and he continued his law practice in Boise until his death in 1893.

== See also ==
- List of justices of the Idaho Supreme Court

Legal offices
Preceded by James B. Hays	Chief Justice of the Idaho Supreme Court; 1888-1889	Succeeded by James H. Beatty
