= Charles Stockslager =

American judge

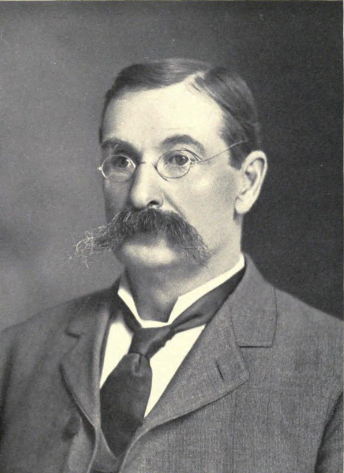
Charles Stockslager c. 1899.

Charles O. Stockslager was a justice of the Idaho Supreme Court from 1901 to 1906, serving as chief justice from 1901 to 1902.

In 1905, Stockslager wrote an early environmentally conscious opinion, holding that mining companies had no right to dump "debris and poisonous substances" in waters with downstream users.

Stockslager was also a Democratic candidate for Governor of Idaho in 1906, and in pursuit of that effort, traveled to Caldwell, Idaho, in the wake of the assassination of Governor Frank Steunenberg there, in order to take advantage of the high public profile to be gained from appearing to be involved in the investigation. He also ran for U.S. Senate in 1909.

Party political offices
Preceded by Henry Heitfeld	Democratic Party nominee, Governor of Idaho; 1906	Succeeded by Moses Alexander
Political offices
Preceded by Joseph W. Huston	Justice of the Idaho Supreme Court; 1901–1906	Succeeded by George H. Stewart
