= Robert D. Leeper =

American judge (1891–1932)

Robert Leeper

Justice of the Idaho Supreme Court
- In office January 1, 1932 – December 19, 1932
- Appointed by: C. Ben Ross
- Preceded by: William McNaughton
- Succeeded by: N.D. Wernette

Personal details
- Born: June 26, 1891 Tacoma, Washington, U.S.
- Died: December 19, 1932 (aged 41) Boise, Idaho
- Resting place: Normal Hill Cemetery; Lewiston, Idaho
- Spouse: Grace Ann Hanly
- Children: 2 sons
- Education: University of Idaho (LL.B., 1913)

Military service
- Allegiance: United States
- Branch/service: U.S. Army
- Years of service: 1917–19
- Battles/wars: World War I

Robert Dwight Leeper (June 29, 1891 – December 19, 1932) was an American attorney and justice of the Idaho Supreme Court.

Born in Tacoma, Washington, Leeper was raised in northern Idaho at Lewiston and Coeur d'Alene, graduating from high school in 1909. He attended the University of Idaho in Moscow, received his LL.B. from its College of Law in 1913, and was in private practice in Coeur d'Alene (also city attorney) and Lewiston. Leeper served as an infantry officer in the United States Army in World War I, where he met his wife, Grace Ann Hanly (1889–1941) of Thomaston, Maine, a Red Cross nurse. He was appointed to the state supreme court by Governor C. Ben Ross in December 1931.

At age 40, Leeper took his seat in Boise on January 1, 1932, but died of pneumonia on December 19, less than a year into his term. His funeral was in Lewiston at St. Stanislaus Catholic Church on December 22, with burial at Normal Hill Cemetery. He was survived by his wife of nine years and two sons.

Political offices
Preceded by William F. McNaughton	Justice of the Idaho Supreme Court; 1932–1932	Succeeded by Nicodemus D. Wernette
