= William E. Lee (Idaho judge) =

American judge (1882–1955)

William Erwin Lee (January 27, 1882 – December 5, 1955) was an American attorney and justice of the Idaho Supreme Court from 1922 to 1930, serving as chief justice from 1926 to 1929.

== Biography ==
Born in North Carolina, Lee graduated from the University of Idaho in Moscow in 1903, and studied law at the University of Washington in Seattle. He received his law degree from the National University School of Law in Washington, D.C., passed the bar in 1906, and returned to Moscow to practice law. He entered into a partnership there with C. J. Orland, under the firm name of Orland & Lee, the firm "building up a lucrative practice". During World War I, he served in the U.S. Army in the judge advocate corps. In August 1922, Lee was nominated by the Republican Party as their candidate for a seat on the state supreme court, and was elected in November.

Re-elected in 1928, Lee was appointed to the Interstate Commerce Commission (ICC) by President Herbert Hoover in January 1930 and left the court. He served as chair for a time, and remained on the commission until he reached the mandatory retirement age in 1953. He died at age 73 in December 1955 and was buried in Arlington National Cemetery.

Political offices
Preceded by John Campbell Rice	Justice of the Idaho Supreme Court; 1922–1930	Succeeded by William F. McNaughton
