= Bertram S. Varian Sr. =

American judge (1872–1963)

Bertram Stetson Varian Sr. (May 12, 1872 – June 8, 1963) was a justice of the Idaho Supreme Court from 1929 to 1933.

== Career ==
Born in Unionville, Pershing County, Nevada, Varian attended the University of Michigan, and was admitted to the Utah State Bar in 1895, and the Idaho State Bar in 1899. He served as a judge for the 7th Judicial District of Idaho from 1919 to 1929, when he was appointed as a justice of the Supreme Court of Idaho, to fill his unfinished term of Herman H. Taylor who had recently died. Varian served until 1933, when he was he defeated for reelection by former Justice William McKendree Morgan, who was returned to the court as part of an anti-incumbent wave spurred by the Great Depression.

== Personal life and death ==
Varian had a son, Bertram S. Varian Jr., who was a naval aviator in the United States Navy during World War II, and who was killed in the Battle of Midway and posthumously awarded the Navy Cross.

Varian died in Boise, Ada County, Idaho, and was interred at Cloverdale Memorial Park, in Boise.

Political offices
Preceded by Herman H. Taylor	Justice of the Idaho Supreme Court; 1929–1933	Succeeded by William McKendree Morgan
