= Alfred Budge House =

Historic house in Idaho, United States

- U.S. National Register of Historic Places
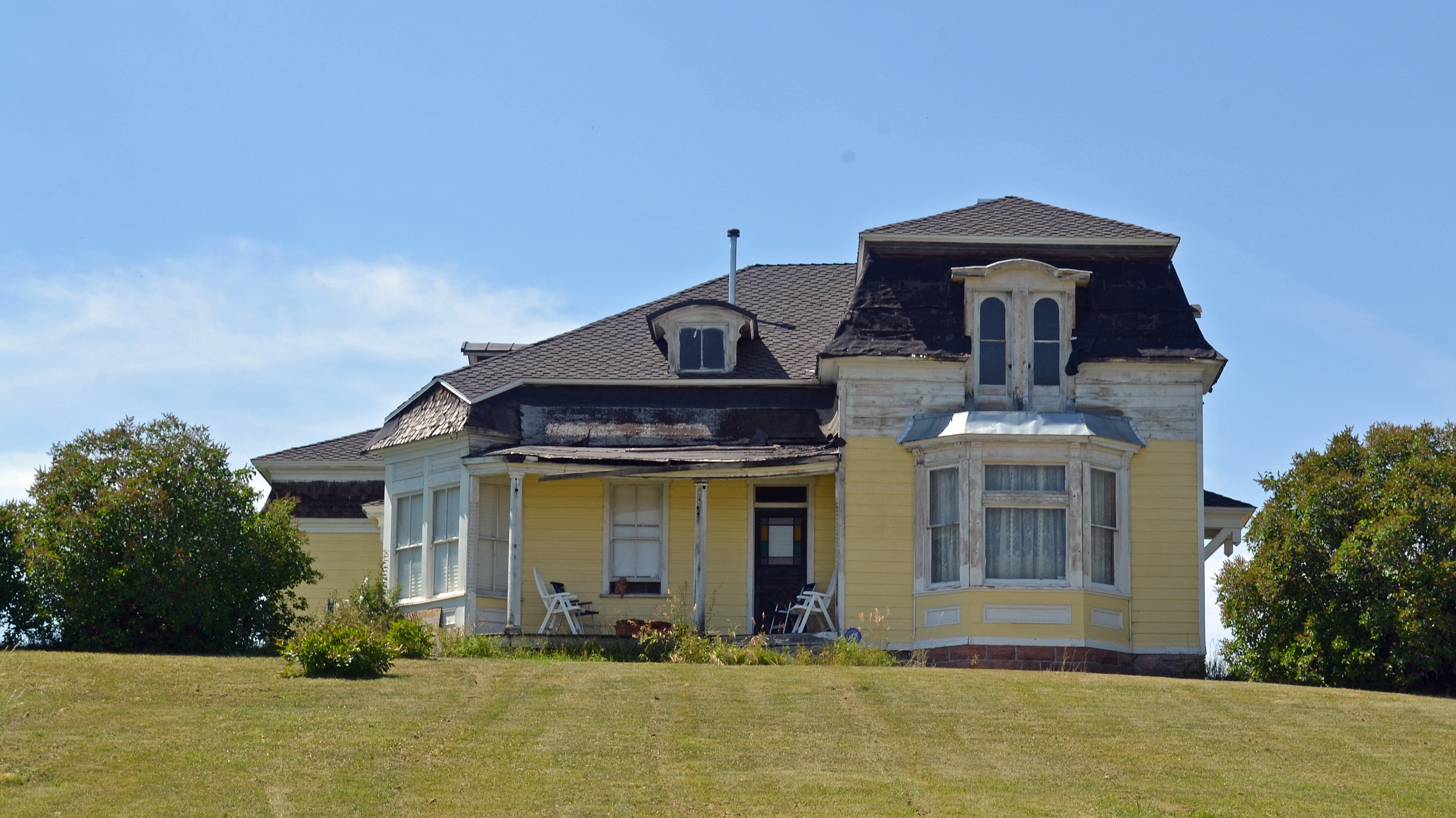

- Location within Idaho Location within the United States
- Location: N. 1st, West, at W. 1st, North, Paris, Idaho
- Coordinates: 42°13′44″N 111°24′14″W
- Area: less than one acre
- Built: 1880
- Architectural style: Second Empire
- MPS: Paris MRA
- NRHP reference No.: 82000267
- Added to NRHP: November 18, 1982

The Alfred Budge House, in Paris, Idaho, located at N. 1st, West at W. 1st, North, is a historic house that was built in 1880. It was renovated to include Second Empire styling, including a mansard roof, at a later date. The house has a complex design with three major sections and multiple smaller ones; while the mansard roof tops the main section, the house has eight roof components in total. It is listed on the U.S. National Register of Historic Places; the listing included six contributing buildings.

It is significant in part as the home of prominent Idahoan Alfred Budge. Budge served as a justice of the Idaho Supreme Court. The house is one of four Paris residences related to the Budge family which are listed on the National Register.

== See also ==
- Budge Cottage, also NRHP-listed in Paris
- Julia Budge House, also NRHP-listed in Paris
- Taft Budge Bungalow, also NRHP-listed in Paris
