= 1906 Idaho gubernatorial election =

- November 6, 1906
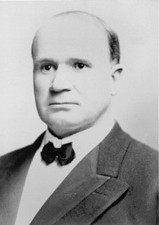

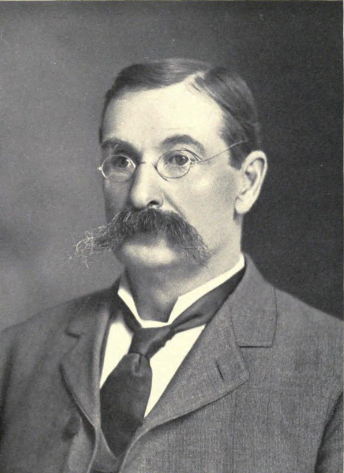

Nominee	Frank R. Gooding	Charles Stockslager	Thomas F. Kelley
Party	Republican	Democratic	Socialist
Popular vote	38,386	29,496	4,650
Percentage	52.18%	40.09%	6.32%
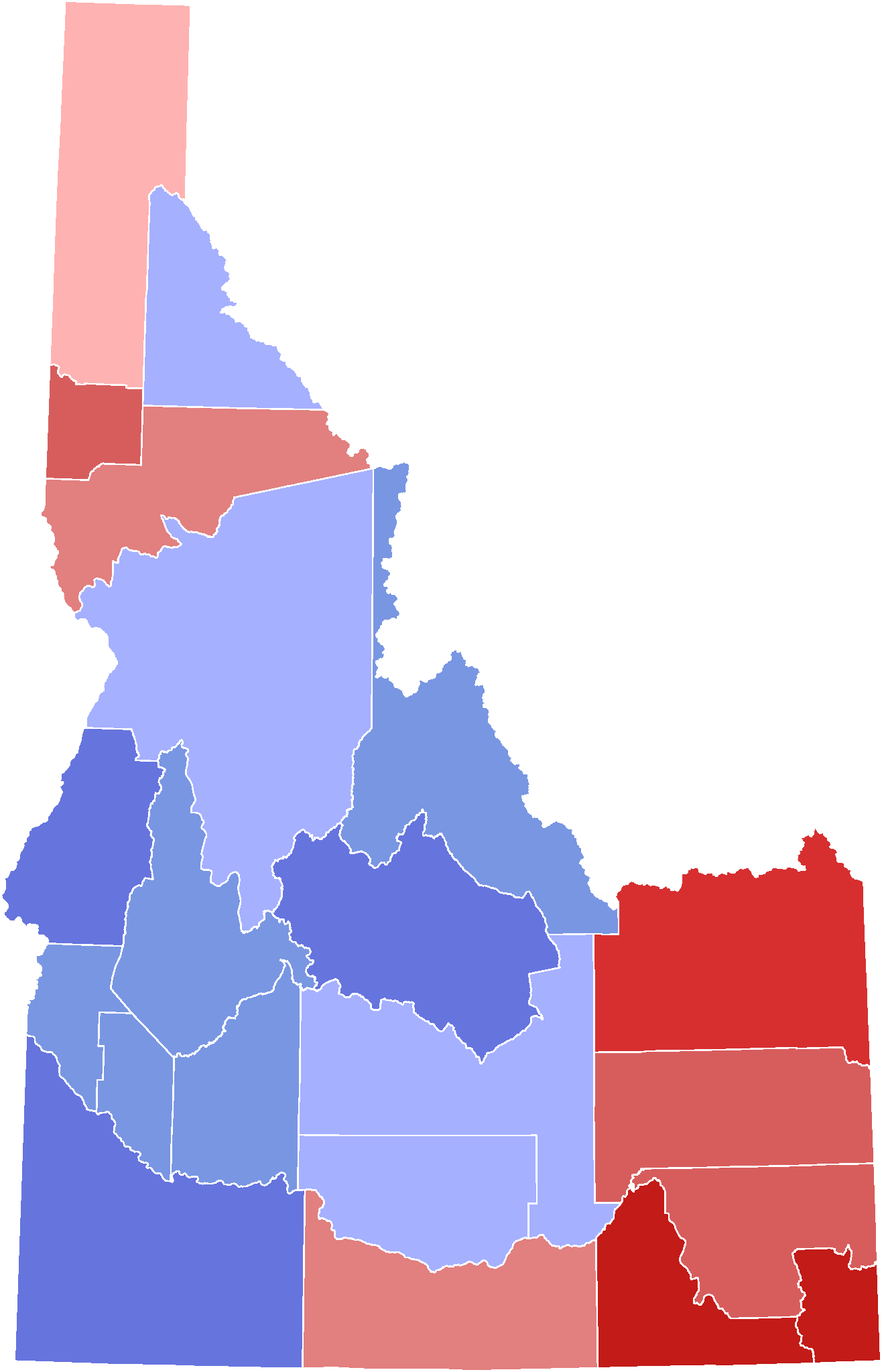
- County results Gooding: 40–50% 50–60% 60–70% 70–80% 80–90% Stockslager: 40–50% 50–60% 60–70%
Governor before election
Frank R. Gooding
Republican
Elected Governor
Frank R. Gooding
Republican

The 1906 Idaho gubernatorial election was held on November 6, 1906. Incumbent Republican Frank R. Gooding defeated Democratic nominee Charles Stockslager with 52.18% of the vote.

== General election ==
=== Candidates ===
Major party candidates

- Frank R. Gooding, Republican
- Charles Stockslager, Democratic

Other candidates

- Thomas F. Kelley, Socialist

=== Results ===
1906 Idaho gubernatorial election
Party	Candidate	Votes	%	±%
Republican	Frank R. Gooding (incumbent)	38,386	52.18%	
Democratic	Charles Stockslager	29,496	40.09%	
Socialist	Thomas F. Kelley	4,650	6.32%	
Majority		8,890		
Turnout				
Republican hold		Swing		
