= Thomas J. Bowers =

American judge (1828–1893)

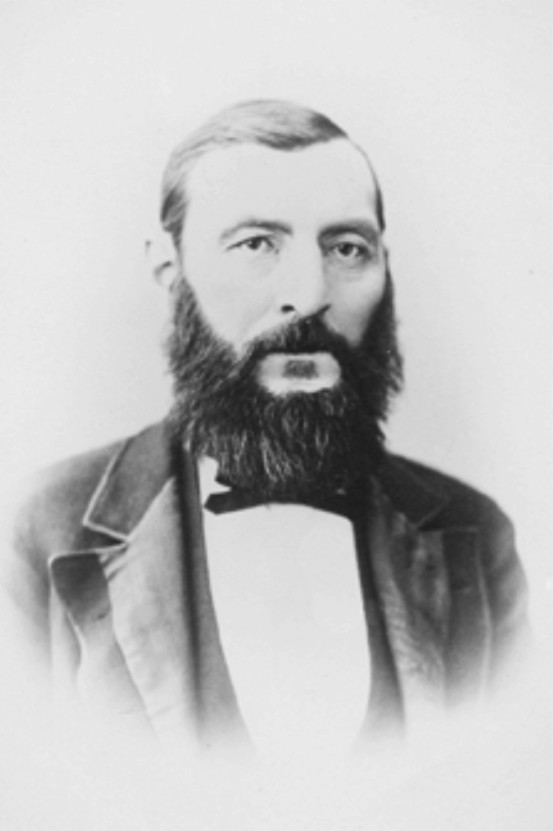

Chief Justice of the Idaho Territorial Supreme Court
- In office July 18, 1868 – June 3, 1869
- Appointed by: Andrew Johnson
- Preceded by: John R. McBride
- Succeeded by: David Noggle

Personal details
- Born: 1828 Nashville, Tennessee, U.S.
- Died: August 26, 1893 (aged 65) San Francisco, California, U.S.
- Party: Democrat
- Spouse: Jane L. Clark

Thomas Jefferson Bowers (1828 – August 26, 1893) was an American lawyer and jurist who was Chief Justice of the Idaho Territorial Supreme Court from 1868 to 1869.

Bowers was born in 1828 in Nashville, Tennessee, where he studied law and began his practice. He moved to Nevada County, California, in 1850, then to Sierra County in 1858. Bowers married Jane L. Clark in 1857.

He was nominated for Chief Justice of the Idaho Territorial Supreme Court by President Andrew Johnson on July 15, 1868, and he was confirmed by the senate three days later. He located in Idaho City, the seat of the territory's second judicial district. A Democrat, Bowers was replaced as chief justice in 1869 by David Noggle when Ulysses S. Grant, a Republican, became president. Noggle, confirmed on April 9, arrived in Idaho and relieved Bowers of his judgeship on June 3, 1869, over the latter's protests.

After his time on the territorial court, Bowers incorporated the Ida Elmore Mining Company in 1869 and served briefly as corporate secretary and trustee, but he soon left Idaho.

Bowers returned to Marin County, California. He served as district attorney 1873-1879 and as superior court judge 1879–1884. In 1884 he resumed his law practice, locating in San Francisco until his death in 1893. He was elected judge of the San Francisco Police Court in 1892.

== See also ==
- List of justices of the Idaho Supreme Court

Legal offices
Preceded by John R. McBride	Chief Justice of the Idaho Supreme Court; 1868-1869	Succeeded by David Noggle
