= David Noggle =

American judge and politician (1809–1878)

The Honorable David Noggle
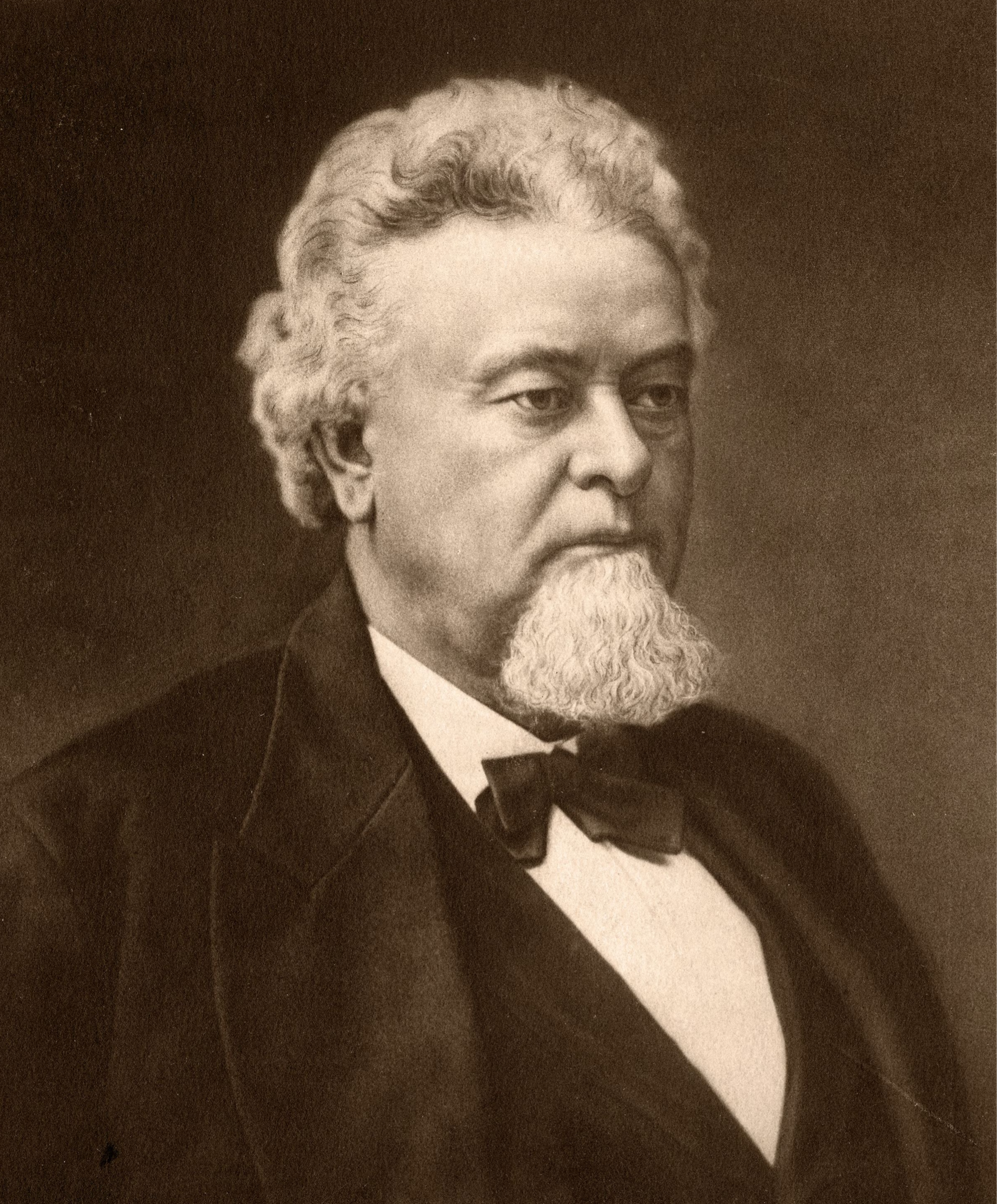

Chief Justice of the Supreme Court of the Idaho Territory
- In office April 9, 1869 – late 1874
- Appointed by: Ulysses S. Grant
- Preceded by: Thomas J. Bowers
- Succeeded by: M. E. Hollister

Wisconsin Circuit Court Judge for the 1st circuit
- In office August 17, 1858 – January 1, 1866
- Appointed by: Alexander Randall
- Preceded by: John M. Keep
- Succeeded by: William P. Lyon

Member of the Wisconsin State Assembly from the Rock 3rd district
- In office January 1, 1857 – January 1, 1858
- Preceded by: Levi Alden
- Succeeded by: Zebulon P. Burdick
- In office January 1, 1854 – January 1, 1855
- Preceded by: Charles Stevens
- Succeeded by: George H. Williston

Personal details
- Born: October 9, 1808 Franklin County, Pennsylvania, U.S.
- Died: July 18, 1878 (aged 69) Janesville, Wisconsin, U.S.
- Resting place: Oak Hill Cemetery, Janesville, Wisconsin
- Party: Republican (after 1854); Independent (1854); Democratic (before 1854)
- Spouse: Anna M. Lewis (m. 1834)
- Children: 8
- Profession: Lawyer, politician, judge

David Noggle (October 9, 1809 – July 18, 1878) was an American politician, lawyer, and jurist. He was chief justice of the Supreme Court of the Idaho Territory from 1869 to 1874, appointed by President Ulysses S. Grant. Earlier, he served as a member of the Wisconsin State Assembly and a Wisconsin circuit court judge.

== Early life and career ==
Born in Franklin County, Pennsylvania, he moved with his family to Greenfield, Ohio, at age 16, where he worked on a farm with his father. Despite having little education in Ohio, attending school only a few weeks a year, he expressed interest in becoming a lawyer. At age 19, he left Ohio to seek employment and worked four years at a factory in Madison, New York. He returned to Ohio in 1833 and, finding his father deeply in debt, purchased his farm in partnership with his brother. Together they restored the farm to prosperity and improved the land with a water-powered mill.

He married Anne M. Lewis, of Milan, Ohio, in 1834, and together they traveled to Winnebago County, Illinois, in 1836, where they purchased government land and started a farmstead. Noggle was still intent on entering the legal profession and spent much of his free time studying legal texts; an anecdote references that he carried a book of the works of William Blackstone to read while tending his fields. In 1838, he was examined by the Supreme Court of Illinois and admitted to the Illinois State Bar Association, having never spent a day in a law office or law school.

In 1839, Noggle sold his farm in Illinois and moved across the border into the Wisconsin Territory. He settled at Beloit and started a law practice. His practice flourished, doing business in Rock, Walworth, Jefferson, and Green counties in the Wisconsin Territory, as well as Winnebago and Boone counties in Illinois.

== Political career ==
His legal work brought him local prominence. He was elected postmaster of Beloit from 1840 through 1845. In 1846, he was a delegate for Rock County to Wisconsin's first constitutional convention. Although the constitution produced by that convention was never adopted, Noggle distinguished himself among the delegates. He fought for the inclusion of progressive items such as the homestead exemption, an elected judiciary, and the rights of married women, and was opposed to a state bank. He became an ardent Democrat and represented Wisconsin as a delegate to the 1848 and 1852 Democratic National Conventions.

Noggle moved to Janesville, Wisconsin, in 1850. In 1853, he was elected to the Wisconsin State Assembly, representing the Janesville-based 2nd Rock County assembly district. Several Democratic partisan newspapers suggested Noggle as a candidate for Speaker of the Assembly for the 1854 session but ultimately he was not chosen.

Like many progressive Democrats, Noggle split with the party over the Kansas–Nebraska Act and ran for Wisconsin State Senate in 1854 as an independent, citing that his platform was that of the 1849 Democratic state convention and the 1854 Republican state convention—meaning total opposition to the expansion of slavery into new states or territories. With the Wisconsin Legislature set to elect a United States Senator in the next session, Noggle pledged he would not vote for a candidate who did not adhere to his position on slavery. He was ultimately unsuccessful as an independent candidate, but subsequently became a member of the new Republican Party.

In 1856, Noggle was elected to the Assembly again, this time on the Republican ticket. At the start of the 1857 session, he was their choice for Speaker of the Assembly. However, due to an injury, he declined the honor, stating that his incapacitation would impair him in carrying out the duties of the speaker. Nevertheless, he remained a leader of the Republican caucus in the Assembly and in the legislative wrangling that secured the election of U.S. senator James Rood Doolittle. He also successfully pushed the Legislature to pass an act (1857 Wisc. Act 44), setting a referendum to amend the Wisconsin Constitution to extend voting rights to women and African Americans. He was outspoken about the issue in the press, but the referendum ultimately failed.

== Judicial career ==
In August 1858, Noggle was appointed Wisconsin circuit court judge for the 1st circuit—southeast Wisconsin—by Governor Alexander Randall following the resignation of Judge John M. Keep. In the April 1859 election, Judge Noggle ran for election to a full six-year term as judge. Initially, it appeared his opponent would be respected Racine attorney and Speaker of the Assembly William P. Lyon, but Lyon—a fellow Republican—deferred. Nevertheless, Noggle did have an opponent in the election—John M. Keep—the man who had resigned the judgeship in 1858, creating the vacancy now up for election. Judge Noggle won a substantial victory in the election, taking nearly 70% of the vote.

Judge Noggle sought reelection in 1865, but this time William P. Lyon did choose to enter the race. Lyon prevailed in the April election and Judge Noggle's term expired at the end of the year. After leaving office, he lived for a short time in Dubuque, Iowa, and was attorney for the Chicago, Milwaukee, and St. Paul Railroad.

On April 7, 1869, President Ulysses S. Grant nominated Noggle to be Chief Jof the Idaho Territorial Supreme Court, and he was confirmed by the senate two days later. As Noggle's four-year term was expiring, Grant renominated him to the same post on March 13, 1873, and he was confirmed by the senate five days later. He resigned due to poor health in late 1874. Noggle returned to Janesville in 1875, and died there in 1878.

== Personal life and family ==
Noggle's father, John Noggle, was Pennsylvania Dutch and his mother was of Irish American descent. He married Anne M. Lewis, of Milan, Ohio, on October 13, 1834. They had at least eight children together, though one died in infancy.

== Electoral history ==
=== Wisconsin Senate (1854) ===
Wisconsin Senate, 17th District election, 1854
| Party | Candidate | Votes | % | ±% |
|---|---|---|---|---|
General election, November 7, 1854
| Republican | James Sutherland | 1,011 | 57.09% | |
| Independent Democrat | David Noggle | 760 | 42.91% | |
| Plurality | | 251 | 14.17% | |
| Total votes | | 1,771 | 100.0% | |

=== Wisconsin Circuit Court (1859) ===
Wisconsin Circuit Court, 1st Circuit election, 1859
| Party | Candidate | Votes | % | ±% |
|---|---|---|---|---|
General election, April 5, 1859
| Republican | David Noggle (incumbent) | 13,213 | 69.78% | |
| Republican | John M. Keep | 5,721 | 30.22% | |
| Plurality | | 7,492 | 39.57% | |
| Total votes | | 18,934 | 100.0% | |

Wisconsin State Assembly
| Preceded by Charles Stevens | Member of the Wisconsin State Assembly from the Rock 3rd district January 1, 1854 – January 1, 1855 | Succeeded by George H. Williston |
| Preceded by Levi Alden | Member of the Wisconsin State Assembly from the Rock 3rd district January 1, 1857 – January 1, 1858 | Succeeded by Zebulon P. Burdick |
Legal offices
| Preceded by John M. Keep | Wisconsin Circuit Court Judge for the 1st circuit August 17, 1858 – January 1, 1866 | Succeeded by William P. Lyon |
| Preceded by Thomas J. Bowers | Chief Justice of the Supreme Court of the Idaho Territory; April 9, 1869 – 1874 | Succeeded by M. E. Hollister |
