= Clay V. Spear =

American judge

Justice of the Idaho Supreme Court
- In office 1965–1971
- Appointed by: Robert Smylie
- Preceded by: Emery T. Knudson
- Succeeded by: Robert E. Bakes

Personal details
- Born: January 10, 1913 Anaconda, Montana, U.S.
- Died: May 15, 1974 (aged 61)
- Political party: Democratic
- Education: University of Idaho (LLB)

Clay V. Spear (January 10, 1913 – May 15, 1974) was an American attorney, and judge who served as a justice of the Idaho Supreme Court from 1965 to 1971.

== Early life, education, and military service ==
Born in Anaconda, Montana, Spear graduated from the University of Idaho in Moscow, and received his J.D. from its College of Law in 1936. He served in the European theatre of World War II, where he "received four battle stars and a Bronze Star medal for service in the Battle of the Bulge". In 1946, he was named head of the VFW of Coeur d'Alene.

== Judicial career ==
Spear was appointed as a district judge in 1953, and elevated to the state supreme court by Governor Robert Smylie in 1965, taking office on January 2, 1966. A resident of Coeur d'Alene at the time, he was the only member of the court from northern Idaho. Spear retired from the court in December 1971 due to poor health, relocated to Lewiston in 1972, and opened a part-time law practice.

== Death ==
Spear "was found dead of a shotgun wound at his home", in an apparent suicide at age 61.

Political offices
Preceded by Emery T. Knudson	Justice of the Idaho Supreme Court; 1965–1971	Succeeded by Robert E. Bakes
