= James W. Porter (judge) =

American judge (1887–1959)

James Winters Porter (June 16, 1887 – December 9, 1959) was a justice of the Idaho Supreme Court from January 3, 1948 until his death on December 9, 1959, serving as a chief justice from 1953 to 1954, and after January 1959.

Born in Humeston, Iowa, Porter received his J.D. from the Drake University Law School in 1910, and gained admission to the bar in Idaho that same year. He entered the practice of law, which was shortly interrupted by his service for three years in the U.S. Army, in the Mexican Border War and in World War I, during which he "served as a captain of artillery and won five battle stars for combat duty overseas".

On February 1, 1937, Porter was appointed to a seat on the 11th Judicial District of Idaho at Twin Falls. He was elected to the state supreme court in 1948, and reelected in 1954. In January 1959, Porter became chief justice by operation of law, due to having the shortest time remaining in his term among elected members of the court.

Porter married his wife Birdie, with whom he had a son; she died in January 1957 at age 66, following a lengthy illness. Nearly three years later, Porter died at St. Luke's hospital in Boise at age 72, a week after having fallen and fractured his hip; he was buried next to his wife at the Twin Falls cemetery.

Political offices
Preceded by Alfred Budge	Justice of the Idaho Supreme Court; 1948–1959	Succeeded by Joseph J. McFadden
