= Clarence J. Taylor =

American judge (1894–1988)

Clarence J. Taylor (1894 – September 24, 1988) was an American attorney, judge, and chief justice of the Idaho Supreme Court from 1949 to 1968.

From Rexburg, Idaho, Taylor attended the University of Utah in Salt Lake City for a year and then transferred to the University of Idaho in Moscow; he received his LL.B. from its College of Law in 1919. Taylor practiced law in Rexburg and shortly became the county prosecutor of Madison County, Idaho.

He served as a state district court judge in Idaho Falls for twenty years prior to his appointment to the state supreme court.

Taylor died at his home in Boise at the age of 94.

Political offices
Preceded by Bert H. Miller	Justice of the Idaho Supreme Court; 1949–1968	Succeeded by Charles R. Donaldson
