= Nicodemus D. Wernette =

American judge (1885–1956)

Nicodemus D. Wernette (sometimes called Nicholas; May 5, 1885 – February 10, 1956) was an American lawyer and judge who served as a justice of the Idaho Supreme Court from 1933 to 1934.

== Early life, education, and career ==
Born in Remus, Michigan, to Jacob and Katherine (Boltz) Wernette, his father was a Canadian-born cabinet maker and farmer. Wernette "got his early schooling in a tiny log building in Michigan", and was educated in the schools of Remus and at the Ferris Institute at Big Rapids, Michigan. He continued working on the family farm until he entered the University of Michigan, receiving his J.D. from the University of Michigan Law School in 1907.

Following his graduation he came to Coeur d'Alene, joining Roy L. Black, later attorney general of Idaho, with whom he was associated until 1919. He then partnered with C. H. Potts. In 1911, he was elected on the democratic ticket as prosecuting attorney of Kootenai County, Idaho, serving for six years. Aside from his profession, he had extensive mining interests in the Coeur d'Alene country. Wernette also served as a member of the city council of Coeur d'Alene, and was chair of the state Democratic Party central committee from 1916 until 1918. He was secretary of the Kootenai County Council of Defense, was a member of the legal advisory board and of the selective service board for the district, containing the four northern counties.

== Judicial service ==
On February 6, 1933, Governor C. Ben Ross appointed Wernette to a seat on the Idaho Supreme Court vacated by the death of Justice Robert D. Leeper.

In 1934, Wernette delivered an address to members of the Twin Falls County bar association on the duty of the lawyer to his client, his profession, and his country, saying, "we must drive from the ranks of the law profession those who are faithless to their trust and who by their actions bring discredit upon us".

Wernette was an unsuccessful candidate for reelection in 1934, with challenger James F. Ailshie building "an unassailable lead" over Wernette in the nonpartisan election held in August of that year. After leaving the court in January 1935, Wernette moved to Spokane, Washington, where he resumed the practice of law.

== Personal life and death ==
On April 4, 1910, Wernette married Ozalinda E. Blanchard, with whom he had seven daughters and one son, all surviving at the time of his death. Wernette had a stroke in May 1950 that led him to retire from his career, but "recovered enough to be able to be up and around much of the time". He lived for five more years, dying at his home in Spokane, Washington, at the age of 70.

Political offices
Preceded by Robert D. Leeper	Justice of the Idaho Supreme Court; 1933–1934	Succeeded by James F. Ailshie
