= Taft Budge Bungalow =

Historic house in Idaho, United States

- U.S. National Register of Historic Places
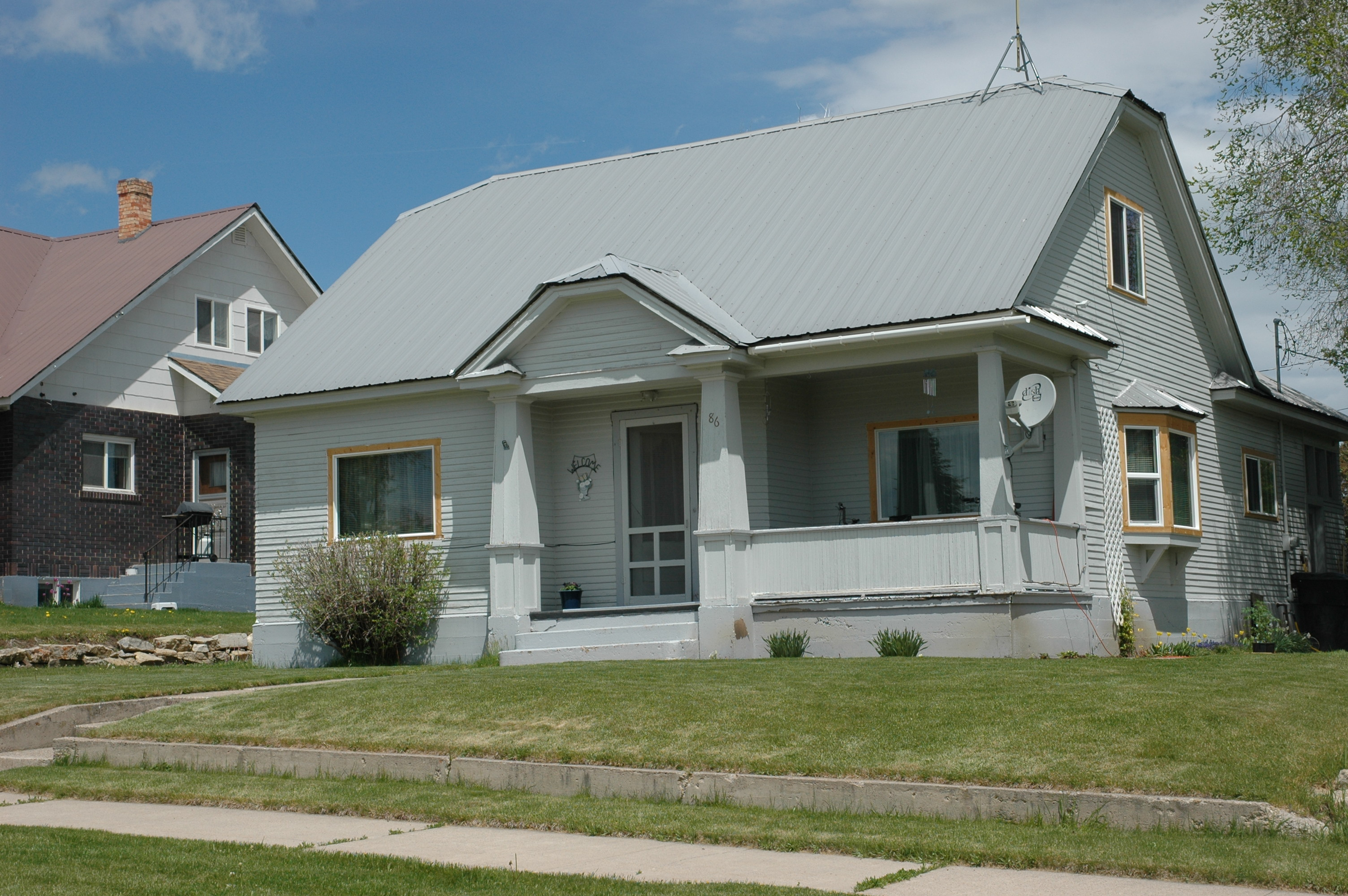

- Location within Idaho Location within the United States
- Location: 86 Center St., Paris, Idaho
- Coordinates: 42°13′38″N 111°24′8″W
- Area: less than one acre
- Architectural style: Colonial Revival, Bungalow
- MPS: Paris MRA
- NRHP reference No.: 83000260
- Added to NRHP: April 13, 1983

The Taft Budge Bungalow, also known as the Taft Budge House, at 86 Center St. in Paris, Idaho, is a historic house that is listed on the National Register of Historic Places. The house is a Colonial Revival style bungalow which features enclosed eaves, a half-porch characteristic of local bungalows, and a gablet roof over the porch. The front facade of the house is horizontally oriented, a unique style for Paris bungalows.

It is one of four residences in Paris associated with the Budge family that is listed on the National Register. The Budge family played a prominent role in the city's Mormon stake, and member Alfred Budge served on the Idaho Supreme Court.

== See also ==
- Budge Cottage, also NRHP-listed in Paris
- Alfred Budge House, also NRHP-listed in Paris
- Julia Budge House, also NRHP-listed in Paris
