= 4th Iowa Independent Battery Light Artillery =

4th Iowa Light Artillery Battery
- Active: November 23, 1863 – July 14, 1865
- Disbanded: July 14, 1865
- Country: United States
- Allegiance: Union
- Branch: Artillery
- Size: Battery (171)
- Engagements: American Civil War

Commanders
- Captain: Philip H. Goode

The 4th Iowa Light Artillery Battery was a light artillery battery from Iowa that served in the Union Army between November 23, 1863, and July 14, 1865, during the American Civil War

== Service ==
The 4th Iowa Light Artillery was mustered into Federal service at Davenport, Iowa, for a three-year enlistment on November 23, 1863. At its creation, it consisted of 152 men, led by a cadre of experienced officers, some of them who had previously served in other Iowa units.

After it was mustered, the battery was attached to the Department of the Northwest. It was assigned to the Northern frontier, under the command of General Alfred Sully. During this period, the battery was tasked with:

- Protecting settlers from incursions by hostile Native American tribes
- Conducting garrison duty at various frontier posts
- Maintaining stability in the region until February 1864

In February 1864, the battery was ordered into New Orleans, Louisiana. Upon its arrival, it was attached to the Defense of New Orleans within the Department of the Gulf.

From June 1864 through July 1865, the battery was assigned to the District of Lafourche. During that time, they participated in:

- The defense of New Orleans
- Garrison Duty at Thibodaux, Louisiana.
- Maintaining military control and security in the District of LaFourche.

The battery remained in the Department of the Gulf for the duration of the war, fulfilling its assigned garrison requirements until the cessation of hostilities.

The battery was mustered out of Federal service on July 14, 1865.

== Total strength and casualties ==
A total of 171 men served in the 4th Iowa Battery at one time or another during its existence. It suffered 5 enlisted men who died of disease, for a total of 5 fatalities.

== See also ==
- List of Iowa units in the American Civil War
- Iowa in the American Civil War

== Bibliography ==
- The Civil War Archive
