= Budge Cottage =

Historic house in Idaho, United States

- U.S. National Register of Historic Places
- Location within Idaho Location within the United States
- Location: Center St., Paris, Idaho
- Coordinates: 42°13′38″N 111°24′17″W
- Area: less than one acre
- MPS: Paris MRA
- NRHP reference No.: 82000266
- Added to NRHP: November 18, 1982

The Budge Cottage is a historic house located on Center Street in Paris, Idaho. The cottage was built in the late 1880s as a rental house for the locally prominent Budge family. The one-story cottage has a hall and parlor plan; while this design was quite common during the early settlement of Paris, it had been largely replaced by larger houses by the 1880s. The Budge Cottage is one of the more ornate hall and parlor cottages built in the city; its design features a gabled porch with turned posts and balusters and decorative moldings on the windows and under the eaves.

The house was added to the National Register of Historic Places on November 18, 1982. It is one of four Paris houses associated with the Budge Family on the National Register; the other three are the Alfred Budge House, the Julia Budge House, and the Taft Budge Bungalow.
