= Alfred Budge =

American judge (1868–1951)

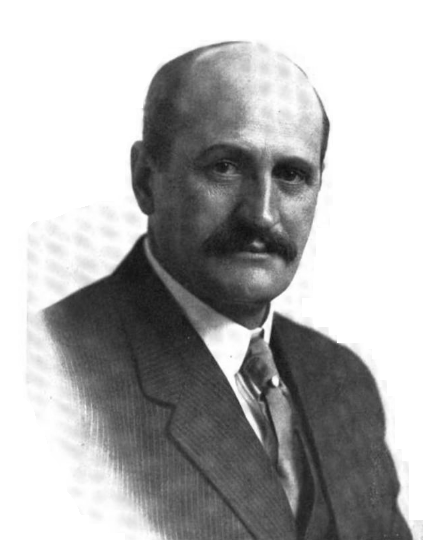
Justice Alfred Budge

Alfred Budge (February 24, 1868 – January 25, 1951) was a justice of the Idaho Supreme Court from 1914 to 1948, including several terms as chief justice.

== Early life, education, and career ==
Born in Providence, Utah, to William Budge and Eliza (Pritchert) Budge, the family moved to Paris, Idaho, when Budge was very young. He was raised on the home ranch of his father, who became a prominent figure in Idaho politics. Budge had limited opportunities for schooling, attending four or six months each year the common schools of Bear Lake county, and at the age of fifteen became a student in the Brigham Young Academy in Provo, Utah, where he spent three years. He was then sent on a mission to Geneva, Switzerland, where he "learned to speak German fluently", and "walked across Switzerland, preaching as he went, and continued walking into Germany". After three years in Germany, he was arrested in Nuremberg and convicted of "preaching a faith hostile to the government"; while his appeal was pending before the supreme court at Munich, he learned that the conviction was likely to be upheld, and "he quietly left the country and reentered Switzerland".

His experience in Germany having stimulated an interest in the law, Budge returned to the United States and attended the University of Michigan Law School, from which he graduated in 1892. In July of that year, he opened an office at Paris, Idaho, and within two years "had acquired a substantial and profitable practice". While residing at Paris, he served as member of the city council, was city attorney, and a school trustee, and was substantially connected with the business affairs of the community. In 1894 he was elected district attorney of the fifth judicial district, then comprising, Bannock, Bear Lake, Bingham, Fremont, Lemhi, and Oneida counties, and in November, 1898, he was elected prosecuting attorney for Bear Lake county, an office which he filled for two years.

== Judicial career ==
A lifelong Republican, in 1902 he was elected as a candidate for that party to a seat as a judge on the fifth judicial district of Idaho, defeating the incumbent Democrat and moving to Pocatello, Idaho, to carry out the office. He was thereafter reelected to a second term on the fifth judicial district, serving a total of 12 years as a district court judge. Budge was "a close personal friend and business partner of former Gov. Frank Steunenberg and was with Steunenberg at Richman, Utah, on the night before an assassin's bomb killed him December 30, 1905".

On November 28, 1914, Governor John Haynes appointed Budge to a seat on the state supreme court. Budge was thereafter repeatedly reelected, serving for 34 years before retiring on December 30, 1948, due to a back injury. Over the course of his career, Budge authored nearly 1,800 opinions.

== Personal life and death ==
On July 5, 1894, in Logan, Utah, he married Ella Hoge, of Paris, Idaho, daughter of Walter and Amelia Hoge. In 1850, Ella was named Idaho's mother of the year. They had eight children, including congressman Hamer H. Budge.

Budge died in Boise at the age of 82.

Political offices
Preceded by George H. Stewart	Justice of the Idaho Supreme Court; 1914–1948	Succeeded by James W. Porter
