= George H. Stewart =

American judge (1858–1914)

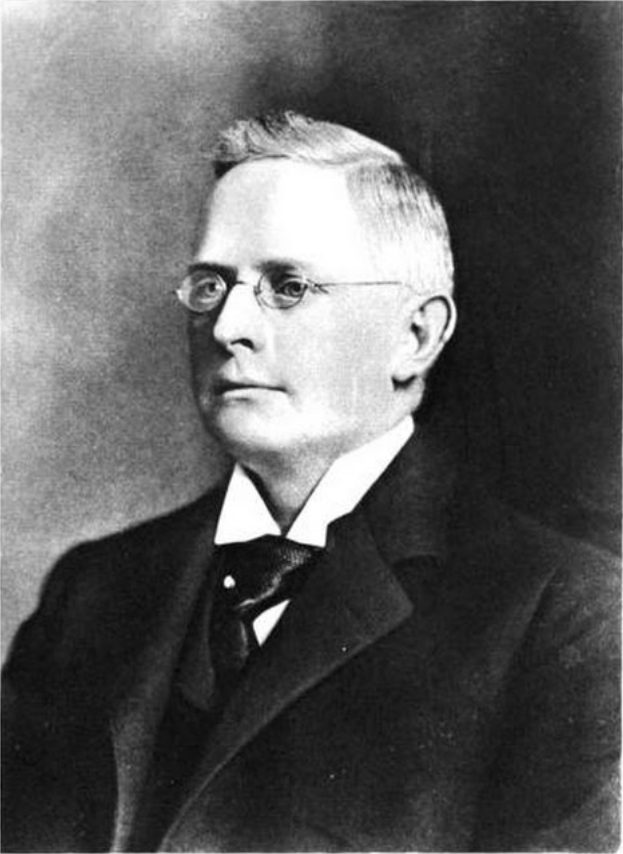
George H. Stewart

George Harlan Stewart (February 26, 1858 – September 25, 1914) was a justice of the Idaho Supreme Court from 1907 to 1914, serving as chief justice from 1913 to 1914.

Born in Connersville, Indiana, Stewart excelled in the local schools, completing a course of study in the Northern Indiana Normal School in 1879, and receiving a J.D. from North Indiana Law School in 1881, the same year he married Elizabeth School, with whom he had two children. After practicing law in Indiana and Nebraska, Stewart relocated to Idaho in 1890, eventually partnering in a legal practice with future U.S. Senator William Borah. In 1893, Stewart was elected to represent Ada County, Idaho in the Idaho Senate, and was then elected to serve as speaker of that body. His wife died in 1895. In 1896, he was appointed to a seat on the Third Judicial District. He remarried in 1888, to Agnes L. Sheets.

In 1907, Stewart was appointed to the Idaho Supreme Court, becoming chief justice in 1913. Stewart died the following year, in Portland, Oregon.

Political offices
Preceded by Charles Stockslager	Justice of the Idaho Supreme Court; 1907–1914	Succeeded by Alfred Budge
