= Ruthann Knudson =

American archaeologist

Ruthann Knudson (1941-2018) was an American archaeologist. She is best known for her work on North American Paleoindian (Plainview) lithics. As a woman in early cultural resource management, Knudson was a strong advocate for the accurate representation of women in reservoir salvage archaeology. Additionally, she was also important in drafting and advocating for the National Historic Preservation Act Amendments of 1980.

== Early life and education ==
Knudson was born on October 24, 1941, in Milwaukee, Wisconsin, to Sidney and Clara Knudson (née Tappe). She is a descendant of members of the Seventh Day Baptist sect who settled in Wisconsin during the 19th century. Knudson was the oldest of three siblings and spent much of her childhood in Duluth, Minnesota. She moved to Duluth from Milwaukee when she was eight years old, where she attended Lincoln Elementary School.

Knudson studied at Hamline University for two years studying liberal arts. During the summers of 1960 and 1961, Knudson worked as a cook at Yellowstone and Mesa Verde National Parks, where her interest in anthropology and archaeology was sparked. Soon after, she transferred to the University of Minnesota because Hamline did not have an anthropology department . There, she received her B.A. (1963) and M.A. (1966) degrees working with Elden Johnson.

During her studies, she assisted in excavations at the Shakopee mounds site. Knudson married fellow graduate student Creighton Thomas Shay in 1965. They moved to Ft. Collins, CO in 1966 after Shay received a faculty position at the University of Northern Colorado. There, Knudson worked as an anthropology instructor from 1966 to 1977. She also participated in a number of excavations and field projects in the summers between 1966 and 1968. She and Shay divorced in 1968.

Knudson began her Ph.D. in anthropology with an emphasis in quaternary studies at Washington State University in 1968, where she worked with Dr. Richard Daugherty. In 1970, she married archaeologist W. Raymond Wood. They divorced a year later. She completed her dissertation on the MacHaffie and Plainview Paleoindian lithic assemblages in 1973.

== Career ==
After completing her Ph.D., Knudson started her own CRM consulting firm called Paleo-Designs. She was hired as an instructor at the University of Idaho in 1974, where she taught undergraduate and graduate courses in anthropology and archaeology. During this time, Knudson also received a grant from the National Science Foundation to report the Red Smoke site in southwestern Nebraska. Between 1978 and 1981, Knudson participated in the Dolores Archaeological Project. While on the project, she helped formulate the project and lithic design plans.

Knudson was hired by environmental consulting firm Woodward-Clyde Consultants in 1981. As a senior scientist, she began the cultural resource management arm out of their San Francisco office. During her tenure, she worked on a variety of CRM projects for the United States government. While working at Woodward-Clyde, Knudson was struck by a vehicle while helping a car accident victim and was placed into intensive care for several weeks. She returned to the University of Idaho in 1988, after she was laid off when Congress cancelled the Hanford Basalt Waste Isolation Project.

In 1990, Knudson was hired as an archaeologist by the National Park Service, where she led several programs. Between 1991 and 1996, she was responsible for the management of the Department of Defense Legacy Resource Management Program and the Public Awareness Working Group.

Knudson moved to Harrison, Nebraska, in 1996, where she was hired as the superintendent of Agate Fossil Beds National Monument. There, she created the Visiting Native Artist program. This program allows for artists to present their arts during the weekends.

In 2005, she retired from the National Park Service. After retirement, Knudson remained active in archaeological research and work^{[40]}. Knudson died on March 25, 2018, of a stroke at Harborview Medical Center in Seattle, Washington.

== Contributions to Cultural Resource Management ==
During her career, Knudson played a prominent role in pioneering women's roles and legislation in cultural resource management.

=== Women in CRM ===
Knudson was an advocate for the representation of women in cultural resource management. In an email, archaeologist Eileen Johnson stated that Knudson struggled as a woman field archaeologist and played a role in breaking through barriers for women. She also wrote about the role of women in early CRM and reservoir salvage archaeology. In a chapter on the River Basin Surveys and the Interagency Archaeological Salvage Program, Knudson stated that the majority of workers in the River Basin Surveys were women playing essential roles in the field and lab.

=== Cultural Resource Legislation ===
Starting in 1978, Knudson served as the legislative coordinator for the Society for American Archaeology. In this role, she testified before Congress between 1978 and 1981. Most notably, she played an active role in drafting and arguing for the 1980 amendments to the National Historic Preservation Act.

== Awards and honors ==
- Distinguished Service Award from the North Central Montana Resource and Preservation Division (2008)
- Woodward Lecturer (1985)
- Margaret Mead Award from the American Anthropological Association (1983)
- Preservation Award from the National Conference of State Historic Preservation Officers (1981)
- Conservation Award from the American Society of Conservation Archaeology (1981)

== Sources ==
1. Knudson, Ruthann. 2011. Auto-History. Provided by Alice Kehoe.
2. Kehoe, Alice B. and Marcel Kornfeld. 2019. Ruthann Knudson. The SAA Archaeological Record 19(2):43-45.
3. Ruthann's Obituary. Archaeology in Montana 59(2):79-80. Provided by Alice Kehoe.
4. Knudson, Ruthann. 2014. Women in Salvage Archaeology. In Dam projects and the growth of American archaeology. The River Basin Surveys and the Interagency Archeological Salvage Program, edited by Kimball M. Banks and Jon S. Czaplicki, pp. 180–201. Left Coast Press, Walnut Creek.
5. Ruthann Knudson. Who's Who Lifetime Achievement. Electronic document. https://wwlifetimeachievement.com/2018/02/13/ruthann-knudson/
6. Ruthann Knudson, NPS Archeologist. 2016. ArcheoThursdays: Topics in NPS Archeology. [https://www.nps.gov/training/NPSArcheology/videos/Archeothursday,%20Knudson.mp4 nps.gov]{{dead link|date=June 2025|bot=medic}}{{cbignore|bot=medic}}
7. Kehoe, Alice B. 2018. Remembering Ruthann Knudson. Mammoth Trumpet 33(3):10-11.
