= Robert E. Bakes =

American judge (born 1932)

Justice of the Idaho Supreme Court
- In office 1971–1993
- Appointed by: Cecil Andrus
- Preceded by: Clay V. Spear
- Succeeded by: Cathy Silak

Personal details
- Born: January 11, 1932 (age 93) Boise, Idaho, U.S.
- Political party: Democratic
- Education: University of Idaho (LLB)

Robert Eldon Bakes (born January 11, 1932) is an American attorney and politician who served as a justice of the Idaho Supreme Court from 1971 to 1993.

== Early life and education ==
Born in Boise, Idaho, Bakes was the son of Warren Bakes, who served for several years as state insurance commissioner. Bakes played baseball and earned an associate degree at Boise Junior College, then graduated first in his class from the University of Idaho College of Law in 1956.

== Career ==
Bakes taught at the University of Illinois College of Law in Urbana, Illinois. In 1966 and 1968, Bakes was a Democratic nominee for a seat in the Idaho House of Representatives, but was not elected in either bid.

On December 22, 1971, Governor Cecil Andrus appointed Bakes to a seat on the Idaho Supreme Court vacated by the retirement of Clay V. Spear. Bakes was chief justice from 1989 until his retirement in 1993. He authored nearly 1,000 written opinions during his judicial career, including many precedent setting cases, such as Bliss Valley v. West One Bank, outlining the law of lender liability. In 1992, he received the Kramer Award for excellence in judicial administration, as well as the Idaho State Bar Outstanding Service Award. He also received an honorary Doctor of Laws degree from the Albertson College of Idaho in 1993 and Distinguished Alumni Service Awards from the University of Idaho and Boise State University in 1989 and 1990.

Bakes retired from the court in February 1993 to return to private practice. In 2003, he received the Distinguished Lawyer Award from the Idaho State Bar. In November 2003, Bakes was hired by the state to serve as a special deputy attorney general representing a district court judge in a dispute over that judge's order that the state pay for a special master to inspect certain Idaho schoolhouses.
