= USS Knudson =

1944 Crosley-class high speed transport

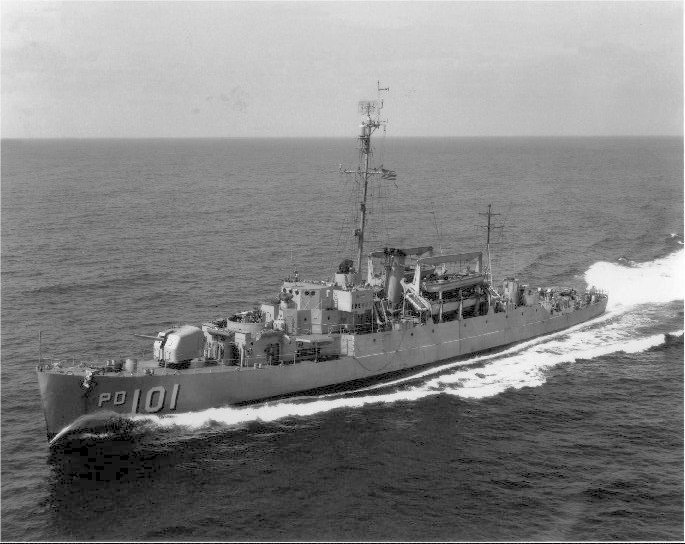
- USS Knudson

History

United States
- Name: USS Knudson
- Namesake: Seaman First Class Milton L. Knudson (1923-1942), a U.S. Navy sailor and Navy and Marine Corps Medal recipient
- Builder: Bethlehem-Hingham Shipyard, Inc., Hingham, Massachusetts
- Laid down: 23 December 1943
- Launched: 5 February 1944
- Sponsored by: Mrs. Emmons R. Knudson
- Commissioned: 25 November 1944
- Decommissioned: 4 November 1946
- Recommissioned: 6 August 1953
- Decommissioned: 2 January 1958
- Reclassified: From destroyer escort (DE-591) to high-speed transport (APD-101) 17 July 1944; Amphibious Transport, Small (LPR-101) 1 July 1969
- Stricken: 15 July 1972
- Honors and awards: One battle star for World War II service
- Fate: Sold for scrapping 10 January 1975
- Notes: Laid down as Rudderow-class destroyer escort USS Knudson (DE-591)

General characteristics
- Class & type: Crosley-class high speed transport
- Displacement: 2,130 long tons (2,164 t) full
- Length: 306 ft (93 m)
- Beam: 37 ft (11 m)
- Draft: 12 ft 7 in (3.84 m)
- Speed: 23 knots (43 km/h; 26 mph)
- Troops: 162
- Complement: 204
- Armament: 1 × 5 in (130 mm) gun; 6 × 40 mm guns; 6 × 20 mm guns; 2 × depth charge tracks

USS Knudson (APD-101), ex-DE-591, later LPR-101, was a United States Navy high-speed transport in commission from 1944 to 1946 and from 1953 to 1958.

== Namesake ==
Milton Lox Knudson was born on 20 October 1923 in Geneva, Illinois. He enlisted in the U.S. Navy on 1 July 1941.

While serving in the destroyer USS Laffey in the Southwest Pacific during World War II, he distinguished himself on 15 September 1942 during rescue operations for survivors of the aircraft carrier USS Wasp, which was torpedoed and sunk by an Imperial Japanese Navy submarine south of Guadalcanal that day. He was awarded the Navy and Marine Corps Medal posthumously for his valor during the rescue operations for Wasp's survivors

During the Naval Battle of Guadalcanal on 13 November 1942, Seaman First Class Knudson was killed when Laffey was sunk by Japanese torpedoes and gunfire in Ironbottom Sound north of Guadalcanal.

== Construction and commissioning ==
Knudson was laid down as the Rudderow-class destroyer escort USS Knudson (DE-591) on 23 December 1943 by Bethlehem-Hingham Shipyard, Inc., at Hingham, Massachusetts, and was launched on 5 February 1944, sponsored by Mrs. Emmons R. Knudson. The ship was reclassified as a Crosley-class high-speed transport and redesignated APD-101 on 17 July 1944. After conversion to her new role, she was commissioned on 25 November 1944.

== Service history ==
=== First period in commission, 1944-1946 ===
==== World War II ====
After shakedown, Knudson departed Norfolk, Virginia on 18 January 1945 for World War II service in the Pacific. Steaming via San Diego, California, she arrived at Pearl Harbor, Territory of Hawaii, on 9 February 1945 for training with underwater demolition team units. With Underwater Demolition Team 19 embarked, she departed Pearl Harbor on 28 February 1945, stopped at Eniwetok, and arrived at Ulithi Atoll on 12 March 1945 to prepare for operations in the Ryukyu Islands.

Clearing Ulithi Atoll on 21 March 1945 for operations off Kerama Retto, Knudson supported Underwater Demolition Team 19 during reconnaissance and demolition operations on Kuba Shima, Aka Shima, Keise Shima, and Geruma Shima from 25 March 1945 to 30 March 1945. While serving as antisubmarine screen on 26 March 1945, she was attacked by a Japanese bomber. Her guns shot the plane down after two bombs had missed her close aboard.

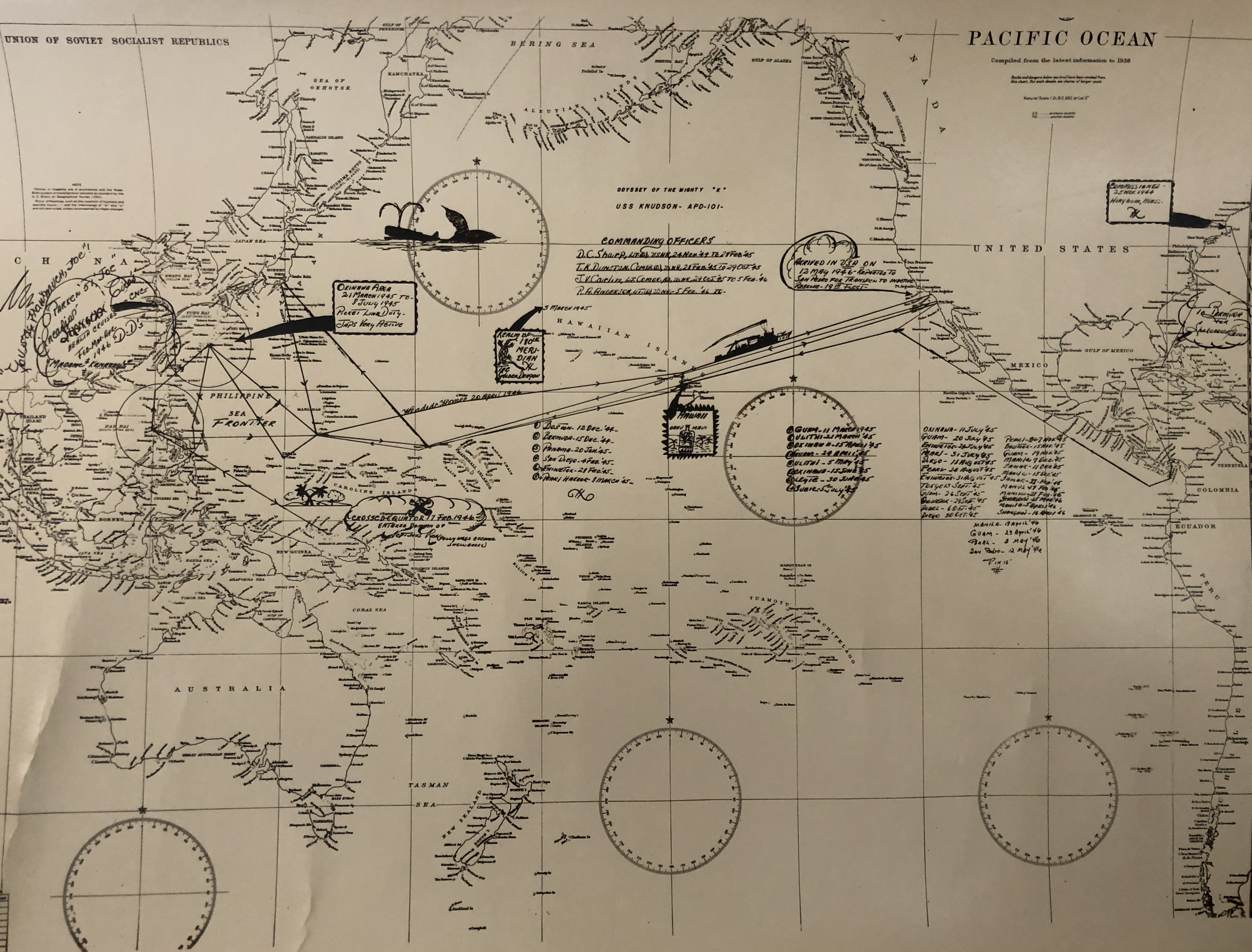
Travel plot of USS Knudson

On 1 April 1945, the day that the initial amphibious landings on Okinawa took place, Knudson continued antisubmarine warfare patrols during amphibious landings at Hagushi, Okinawa. During the next two weeks she conducted screening patrols off the western shores of Okinawa in support of the Okinawa campaign.

Knudson departed Okinawan waters on 14 April 1945, escorting the battleship USS Nevada (BB-36) to Guam, arriving there on 19 April 1945. She then proceeded to Ulithi Atoll on 23 April 1945, debarked Underwater Demolition Team 19 on 25 April 1945, and departed Ulithi on 5 May 1945 for Okinawa escorting the heavy cruiser USS Portland (CA-33).

Reaching Okinawa on 8 May 1945, she resumed screening duty and helped repel Japanese air attacks until 15 June 1945, when she departed Hagushi Anchorage for Leyte in the Philippines.

Arriving at Leyte on 18 June 1945, Knudson operated in the northern Philippines until 4 July 1945. She departed Subic Bay, Luzon, as escort for an Okinawa-bound tank landing ship (LST) convoy, reaching Guam on 16 July 1945. After embarking Underwater Demolition Team 19, she departed Guam on 19 July 1945 and called at Eniwetok and Pearl Harbor before proceeding to the United States West Coast, arriving at San Diego on 5 August 1945. Knudson embarked Underwater Demolition Team 25 on 13 August 1945. World War II ended with the surrender of Japan the next day, 14 August 1945, which was 15 August 1945 across the International Date Line in East Asia.

==== Postwar ====
Knudson departed San Diego on 16 August 1945 for the Far East, and arrived in Tokyo Bay, Japan, on 4 September 1945. She operated out of Yokosuka, Japan, until 20 September 1945, when she returned to the United States, arriving at San Diego on 11 October 1945.

Knudson continued her service in the Pacific from 30 October 1945 to 12 May 1946, carrying men and supplies to bases in the Marshall Islands, Mariana Islands, Admiralty Islands, and Philippines.

Departing Manila Bay, Luzon, on 20 April 1946 with homebound veterans embarked, Knudson arrived at San Pedro, California, on 12 May 1946. She was decommissioned on 4 November 1946 and entered the San Diego Group, Pacific Reserve Fleet, on 15 November 1946.

=== Second period in commission, 1953-1958 ===
Knudson recommissioned on 6 August 1953. After shakedown and conversion to a high-speed transport flagship, she departed San Diego on 3 May 1954 for the Western Pacific. Arriving at Yokosuka, Japan, on 23 May 1954, she conducted amphibious exercises off Japan, South Korea, and Okinawa.

Clearing Tokyo Bay on 13 August 1954, she set course for the Vietnamese coast, where she arrived at Haiphong, North Vietnam, on 22 August 1954. As flagship for the Commander, Embarkation Group, she participated in Operation Passage to Freedom, through which the U.S. Navy evacuated almost 300,000 Vietnamese from North Vietnam to South Vietnam. From 22 August 1954 to 19 September 1954, she operated out of Haiphong during the loading of refugees, cargo, and military equipment by U.S. Navy ships. Then she steamed to Saigon, South Vietnam, arriving on 22 September 1954.

Continuing to Subic Bay in the Philippines on 2 October 1954, she stopped at Hong Kong before returning to Yokosuka on 1 November 1954. On 7 November 1954 she departed Yokosuka for the United States, arriving at San Diego on 23 November 1954.

Knudson operated out of San Diego and Long Beach, California, supporting amphibious training during 1955 and early 1956.

Departing Long Beach on 24 March 1956, Knudson steamed via Pearl Harbor to Eniwetok, where she arrived on 10 April 1956. She supported nuclear tests in the Marshall Islands before returning to Pearl Harbor on 23 July 1956. She returned to Long Beach on 6 August 1956 and resumed amphibious, underwater demolition team, and antisubmarine warfare training operations. She then moved to San Francisco, California, on 27 September 1956.

== Final decommissioning and disposal ==
Knudson was decommissioned for the second and last time on 2 January 1958 and joined the Stockton Group, Pacific Reserve Fleet. She later transferred to the Texas Group, Atlantic Reserve Fleet, at Orange, Texas. While in reserve, she was reclassified as an "amphibious transport, small" and redesignated LPR-101 on 1 July 1969.

Kundson was stricken from the Naval Vessel Register on 15 July 1972. She was sold for scrapping on 10 January 1975, for US$62,261, to General Metals of Tacoma, Inc., of Tacoma, Washington.

== Honors and awards ==
- Asiatic-Pacific Campaign Medal with one battle star
- World War II Victory Medal
- Navy Occupation Medal with "ASIA" clasp
- National Defense Service Medal
- Korean Service Medal
- United Nations Korea Medal
