= James B. Hays =

American politician and judge (1838–1888)

The Honorable James Hays
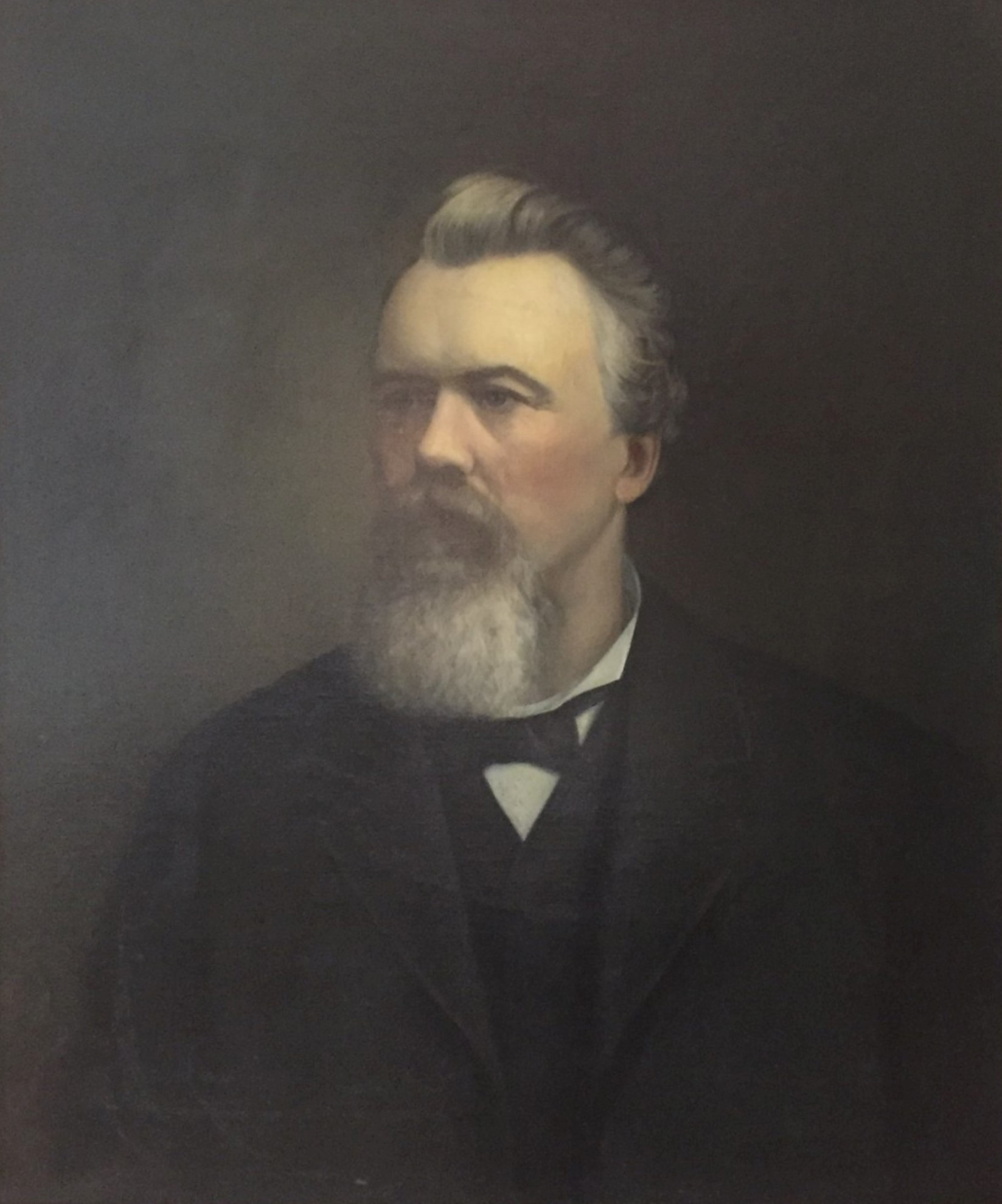

Chief Justice of the Supreme Court of the Idaho Territory
- In office July 1, 1885 – May 31, 1888
- Appointed by: Grover Cleveland
- Preceded by: John T. Morgan
- Succeeded by: Hugh W. Weir

Member of the Wisconsin State Assembly from the Dodge 2nd district
- In office January 7, 1867 – January 6, 1868
- Preceded by: Andrew Willard
- Succeeded by: Lewis M. Benson

Personal details
- Born: September 10, 1838 Crawford County, Pennsylvania, U.S.
- Died: May 31, 1888 (aged 49) Boise, Idaho Territory, U.S.
- Resting place: Saint Paul's Episcopal Cemetery, Ashippun, Wisconsin
- Party: Democratic
- Spouse: Permelia Elizabeth Hubbard (m. 1863–1888)
- Children: 3, including S. H. Hays
- Education: University of Wisconsin
- Profession: Lawyer, judge
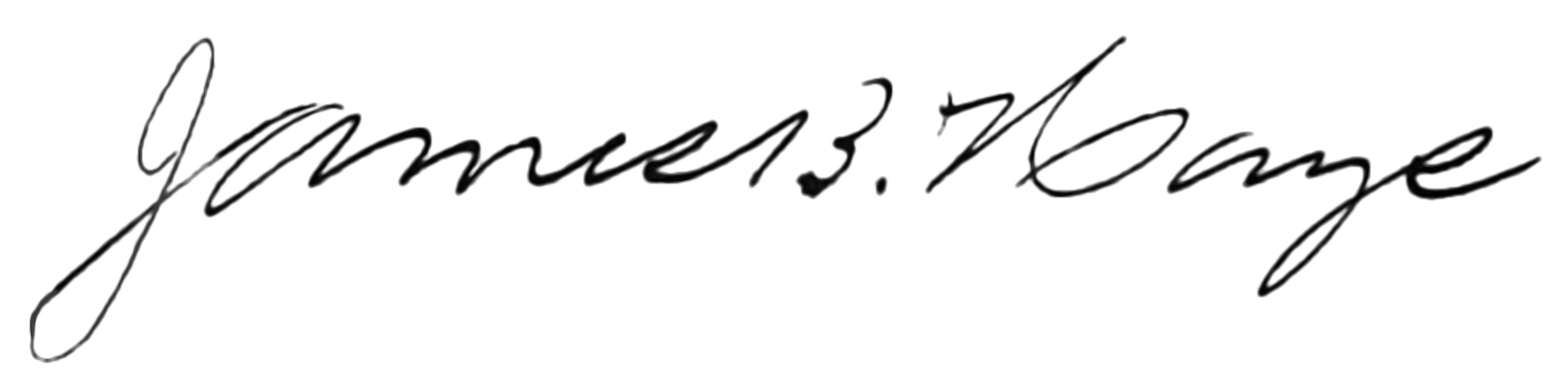
- Signature

James Buchanan Hays (September 10, 1838 – May 31, 1888) was an American attorney, politician, and jurist. He served 3 years as Chief Justice of the Supreme Court of the Idaho Territory (1885–1888), and earlier in his career served one term in the Wisconsin State Assembly (1867).

== Early life and education ==
Born in Crawford County, Pennsylvania, Hays moved with his family to Ashippun, Wisconsin Territory, in 1847. He attended the University of Wisconsin and studied law in Horicon, Wisconsin. He married Permelia Elizabeth Hubbard (1844–1928) in 1863.

== Career ==
In Wisconsin, Hays served as Clerk of the Wisconsin circuit court in Dodge County, and was admitted to the Wisconsin Bar in 1865. While living in Juneau, Wisconsin, Hays served in the Wisconsin State Assembly in 1867. He then served as the district attorney of Dodge County in 1874. He was an unsuccessful candidate for Secretary of State of Wisconsin in 1877.

On July 1, 1885, Hays received a recess appointment as Chief Justice of the Idaho Territorial Supreme Court from President Grover Cleveland. He was formally nominated by Cleveland on December 14, 1885, and confirmed by the senate on October 2, 1886.

== Personal life ==
Hays died in Boise, Idaho Territory, while still in office and was buried in Wisconsin. Hays' eldest son, Samuel H. Hays, was a politician and attorney who served as the mayor of Boise, Idaho, and 29th Idaho Attorney General.

Party political offices
Preceded by Peter Doyle	Democratic nominee for Secretary of State of Wisconsin; 1877	Succeeded by Samuel Ryan Jr.
Wisconsin State Assembly
Preceded by Andrew Willard	Member of the Wisconsin State Assembly from the Dodge 2nd district January 7, 1867 – January 6, 1868	Succeeded by Lewis M. Benson
Legal offices
Preceded by John T. Morgan	Chief Justice of the Supreme Court of the Idaho Territory; July 1, 1885 – May 31, 1888	Succeeded by Hugh W. Weir
