= Julia Budge House =

Historic house in Idaho, United States

- U.S. National Register of Historic Places
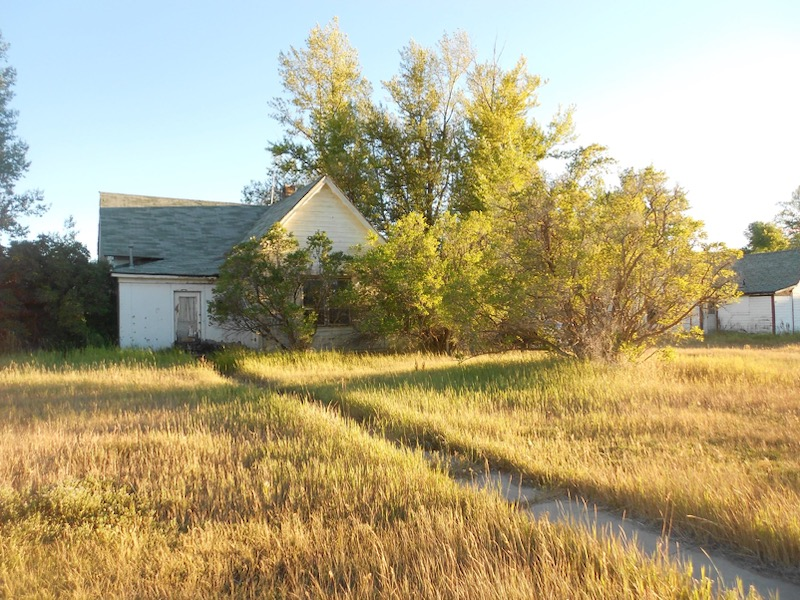

- Location within Idaho Location within the United States
- Location: 57 W. 1st, North, Paris, Idaho
- Coordinates: 42°13′43″N 111°24′6″W
- Area: less than one acre
- Built: 1890s
- Architectural style: Queen Anne
- MPS: Paris MRA
- NRHP reference No.: 82000268
- Added to NRHP: November 18, 1982

The Julia Budge House was a historic house located at 57 W. 1st North in Paris, Idaho. The house was constructed in the 1890s for Julia Budge, one of the wives of Mormon leader William Budge. Julia Budge worked as the Paris telegraph operator and was an active member of the Paris Ladies' Relief Society. The house has a one-story cottage plan with Queen Anne details, including a trefoil bargeboard pattern, bracketed window heads, and pendant-shaped finials.

The house was added to the National Register of Historic Places on November 18, 1982. It is one of four houses connected to the Budge family on the National Register; the other three are the Budge Cottage, the Alfred Budge House, and the Taft Budge Bungalow.
