= George H. Williston =

American politician

George H. Williston (c. 1818 – January 9, 1881) was an American politician.

Born in Binghamton, New York, he moved to Harmony, Rock County, Wisconsin Territory in 1837. In 1841, he then moved to Janesville, Wisconsin Territory when elected register of deeds. Williston also served on the Janesville Common Council. He served in the Wisconsin Territorial Legislature in 1846 and 1848. He also served in the Wisconsin State Assembly in 1855. He died in Janesville, Wisconsin.
