= Emery T. Knudson =

American judge (1896–1974)

Emery Knudson

Chief Justice of the Idaho Supreme Court
- In office January 3, 1963 – January 1965
- Preceded by: E.B. Smith
- Succeeded by: Henry McQuade

Justice of the Idaho Supreme Court
- In office 1959–1965
- Preceded by: William D. Keeton
- Succeeded by: Clay V. Spear

Personal details
- Born: September 3, 1896 Post Falls, Idaho
- Died: June 13, 1974 (aged 77) Post Falls, Idaho
- Resting place: Evergreen Cemetery; Post Falls, Idaho
- Education: University of Idaho; LL.B. 1921

Military service
- Allegiance: United States
- Years of service: 1918
- Battles/wars: World War I

Emery Thomas "E. T." Knudson (September 3, 1896 – June 13, 1974) was a justice of the Idaho Supreme Court from 1959 to 1965, serving as chief justice from 1963 to 1965. He received his LL.B. from the University of Idaho College of Law in 1921 and was a member of Kappa Sigma fraternity.

From northern Idaho, Knudson was born in Post Falls, graduated from Coeur d'Alene High School, and served overseas during World War I.

Knudson was elected to the court in 1959. In early 1965, he became the first elected official in Idaho to take a controversial loyalty oath enacted by the state legislature in 1963, and thereafter enjoined while awaiting litigation. Knudson resigned from the court later that year.

Political offices
Preceded by William D. Keeton	Justice of the Idaho Supreme Court; 1959–1965	Succeeded by Clay V. Spear
