= William McKendree Morgan =

American judge (1869–1942)

William McKendree Morgan (December 2, 1869 – October 16, 1942) was an American judge, lawyer and politician who served for two separate periods on the Idaho Supreme Court.

== Life ==
Morgan was born in Adams County, Illinois to John Milton and Mary (née Gooding) Morgan. He was educated in the country schools of Bourbon County, Kansas, later attending the Kansas Normal College at Fort Scott. In 1890, when twenty years of age, he set out to win a fortune in the far west. Making his way to Idaho, he located at Moscow in Latah County and secured employment on ranches in that vicinity. During the winter of 1890–91, he took up the study of law, and was admitted to the bar on October 9, 1894.

In the interim, he became a deputy sheriff of Latah County, serving in that position from 1 January 1893, until 1895, when he began practice. He served as a Democrat in the state legislature from 1897 to 1899, and in 1897 was also appointed private secretary to Henry Heitfeld, United States senator, and continued in that position for five years or until 1902, spending most of the period in Washington, D.C. While there, he pursued a course in the law department of Georgetown University, receiving an LL.M. in 1899.

Morgan's brother Albert was also an Idaho lawyer, and the brothers were law partners at various times. Although they were closely associated in their professional and social interests, they had opposite political views, Morgan being a Democrat and his brother being a staunch Republican.

Morgan served as mayor of Moscow from 1906 to 1908 and returned to the state legislature from 1911 to 1913, serving as the minority leader in the House. In 1914 he was elected to the Idaho Supreme Court, and by natural rotation became chief justice on January 1, 1919. Morgan resigned from the Idaho Supreme Court in 1920, returning to private practice. However, he defeated incumbent Justice Bertram S. Varian to return to the Idaho Supreme Court in 1933, and served until his death at age 72 in 1942.

== Family ==
Morgan married Emma May Friedline of Moscow on July 22, 1895. They had two daughters, Pearl and Grace, and a son, Arthur Percival, who died at the age of seventeen months.
