= Joseph J. McFadden =

American judge (1916–1991)

Joseph James McFadden (May 3, 1916 – November 28, 1991) was an American jurist who served as Chief Justice of the Idaho Supreme Court, and served on the court from 1959 to 1982.

Born in Boise, Idaho, McFadden went to high school in Hailey, did pre-law studies in Pocatello, and attended the University of Idaho College of Law in Moscow for two years.

McFadden then became a court reporter for judge Doran Sutphen of the Idaho 4th Judicial District, in Gooding, under whom McFadden continued his legal studies, gaining admission to the bar in Idaho in 1940. He then entered the practice of law in Hailey, leaving for two years to serve in the military during World War II, from 1944 to 1946.

After the war, McFadden returned to Hailey, and the following year, after the death of his father, was elected to the position his father had held of Blaine County prosecutor.

In 1959, Governor Robert E. Smylie appointed McFadden to the Idaho Supreme Court; the seat was vacated by the death of Chief Justice James W. Porter. McFadden was re-elected to the court in 1960, 1966, 1972, and 1978, then resigned from the court on August 31, 1982, continuing to hear cases by designation until his death.

He died in a hospital in Boise.

Political offices
Preceded by James W. Porter	Justice of the Idaho Supreme Court; 1959–1982	Succeeded by Robert C. Huntley
