= 2002 United States Senate elections =

- November 5, 2002
- Class 2

34 (Note: 33 Class 2 seats, as well as 1 Class 1 seat in special election) of the 100 seats in the United States Senate 51 seats needed for a majority
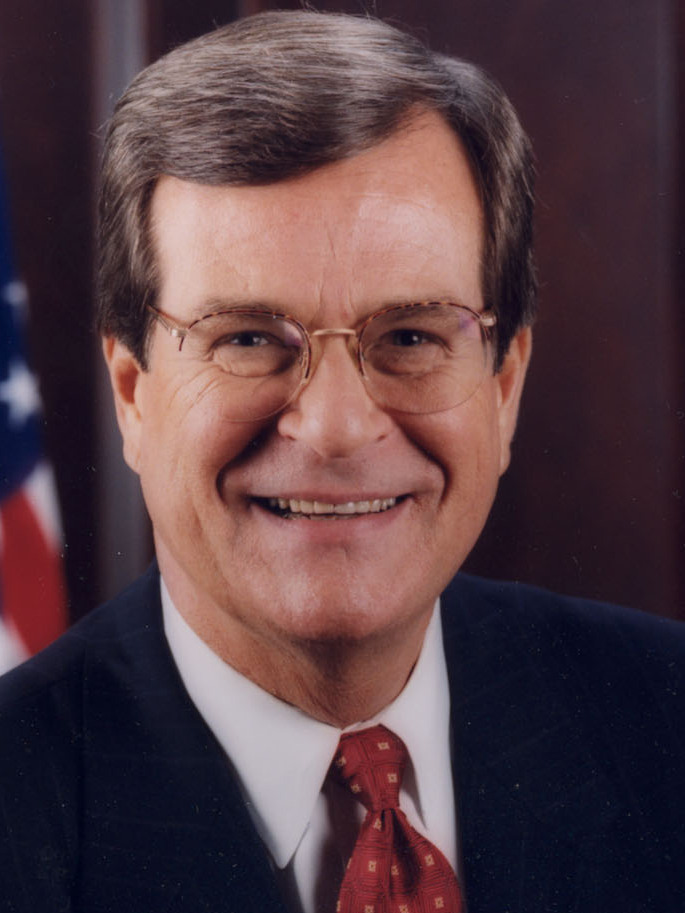

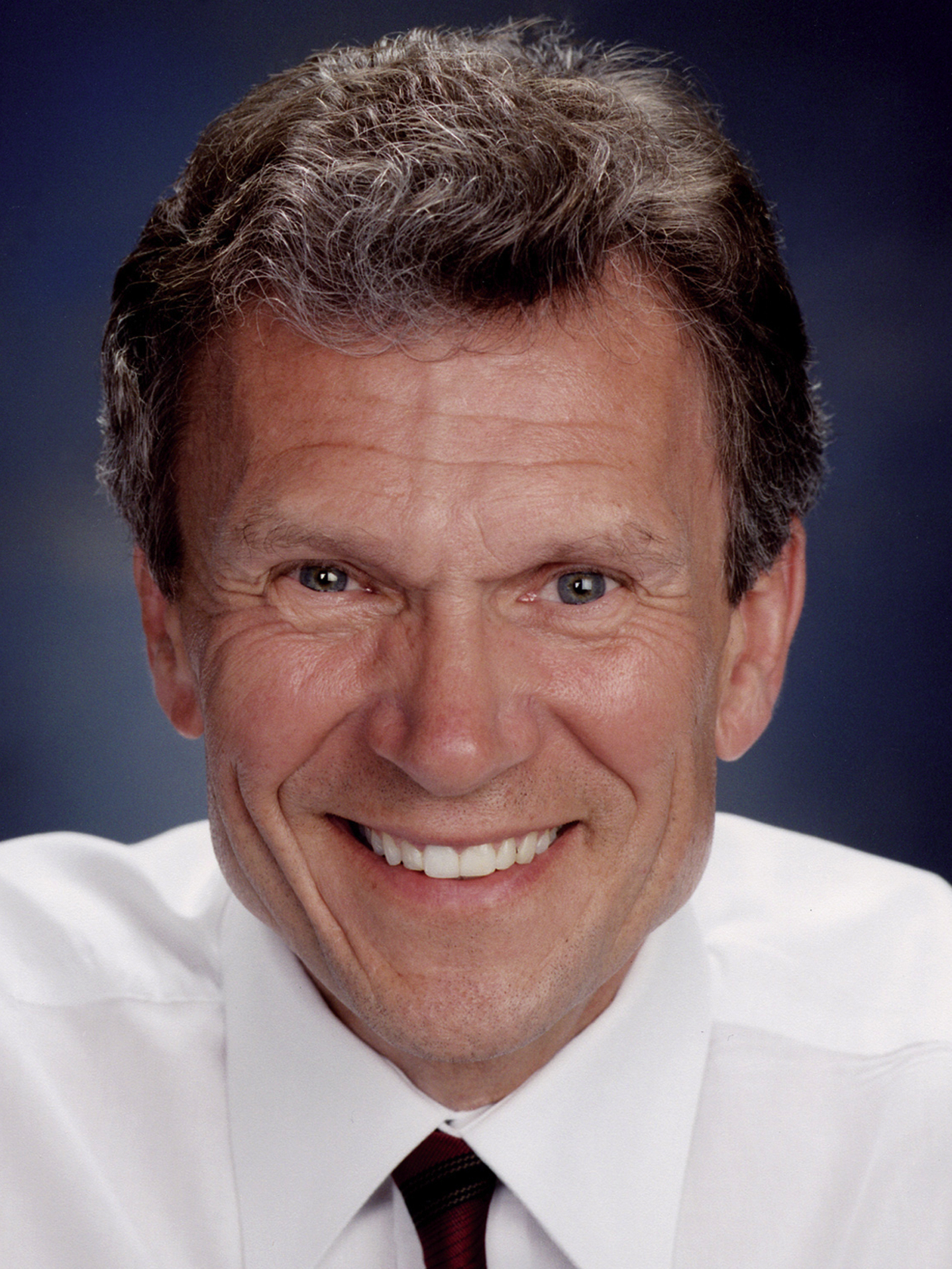
	Majority party	Minority party
Leader	Trent Lott	Tom Daschle
Party	Republican	Democratic
Leader since	June 12, 1996	January 3, 1995
Leader's seat	Mississippi	South Dakota
Seats before	49	49
Seats after	51	48
Seat change	▲2	▼1
Popular vote	21,566,016	19,873,164
Percentage	49.9%	46.0%
Seats up	20	13
Races won	22	12
	Third party	Fourth party
Party	Independence	Independent
Seats before	1	1 (Note: The Independent senator was Jim Jeffords of Vermont, who caucused with the Democratic Party.)
Seats after	0	1
Seat change	▼1	Steady
Popular vote	45,139 (Note: The Alaskan Independence Party, an unrelated party to the Minnesota Independence Party, won 6,724 votes in the Alaskan election, bringing the total number of votes for an "Independence" candidate to 51,863.)	343,625
Percentage	0.1%	0.8%
Seats up	1	0
Races won	0	0
- Results of the elections: Democratic gain Democratic hold Republican gain Republican hold No election
Majority Leader before election
Tom Daschle
Democratic
Elected Majority Leader
Bill Frist
Republican

The 2002 United States Senate elections featured a series of fiercely contested elections that resulted in a victory for the Republican Party, which gained two seats and thus a narrow majority from the Democratic Party in the United States Senate. The Senate seats up for election, known as class 2 Senate seats, were last up for regular election in 1996. The election cycle was held on November 5, 2002, almost 14 months after the September 11, 2001 attacks.

Going into the election, Democrats had a 51–49 majority due to an Independent that caucused with them. However, this was reduced to a 50–49–1 plurality following the death of Democrat Paul Wellstone and the appointment of a member of the Independence Party of Minnesota in his place. The Democrats had originally hoped to do well, as the party holding the presidency historically loses seats in midterm elections, and additionally, the Republicans had 20 seats up for election compared to 14 Democratic seats up for election. In addition, the Republicans had five open seats, while the Democrats and the Independence Party of Minnesota had one each. However, the Republicans were able to hold their five open seats and pick the one that was held by the IPM up, while the Democrats held their only open seat. Republicans also defeated two Democratic incumbents, while Democrats defeated one Republican incumbent.

Trent Lott led the Senate Republicans through this election cycle and was due to become the new Senate Majority Leader upon the retaking of control of the Senate by the Republicans. However, his controversial praise for Strom Thurmond's 1948 segregationist Dixiecrat presidential campaign at Thurmond's 100th birthday celebration led to Lott's stepping down from Senate leadership, and resulted in Tennessee Republican Bill Frist being selected as the new Senate majority leader instead.

This was the only election cycle in which the party of the incumbent president gained new control of a house of Congress in a midterm election. This is also the last midterm election cycle in which the party controlling the White House flipped a Senate seat in a state they did not win in the preceding presidential election (in this case, Minnesota). As of 2025, this was the last Senate election cycle in which Republicans won Senate elections in Minnesota, New Mexico, Oregon, and Virginia.

== Results summary ==
↓
48	1	51

Democratic	Independent	Republican

Parties						Total
Parties	Democratic	Republican	Independent	Independence	Others	Total
Last elections (2000)	50	50	0	0	0	100
Before these elections	49	49	1	1	0	100
Not up	36	29	1	0	—	66
Up	13	20	0	1	—	34
Class 2 (1996→2002)	12	20	—	1	—	33
Special: Class 1	1	0	—	—	—	1
Incumbent retired	0	4	—	1	—	5
Held by same party	0	4	—	0	—	4
Replaced by other party	▼1 Independence replaced by ▲1 Republican				—	1
Result	0	5	0	0	0	5
Regular elections
Incumbent ran	12 (Note: Robert Torricelli withdrew from re-election to represent New Jersey, and was replaced by Frank Lautenberg.)	16 (Note: Bob Smith lost renomination to represent New Hampshire, and John E. Sununu became the party's new nominee.)	—	0	—	28
Won re-election	10	14	—	0	—	24
Lost re-election	▼1 Republican replaced by ▲1 Democrat ▼1 Democrat replaced by ▲1 Republican		—	—	—	2
Lost or withdrew renomination but held by same party	1	1	—	—	—	2
Result	12	16	0	0	0	28
Special election
Appointee ran	1	0	—	0	—	1
Won election	0	—	—	0	—	0
Lost election	▼1 Democrat replaced by ▲1 Republican		—	—	—	1
Result	0	1	0	0	0	1
Total elected	12	22	0	0	0	34
Net change	▼1	▲2	Steady	▼1	Steady	2
Nationwide vote	19,873,164	21,566,016	343,625	45,139/51,863	1,413,653 / 1,406,929	43,241,597
Share	45.96%	49.87%	0.79%	0.10 / 0.12%	3.27 / 3.25%	100%
Result	48	51	1	0	0	100

Source: Clerk of the U.S. House of Representatives

== Change in composition ==
=== Before the elections ===
After the death of Paul Wellstone on October 25, 2002, and the appointment of Minnesota on November 4.

D_{1}	D_{2}	D_{3}	D_{4}	D_{5}	D_{6}	D_{7}	D_{8}	D_{9}	D_{10}
D_{20}	D_{19}	D_{18}	D_{17}	D_{16}	D_{15}	D_{14}	D_{13}	D_{12}	D_{11}
D_{21}	D_{22}	D_{23}	D_{24}	D_{25}	D_{26}	D_{27}	D_{28}	D_{29}	D_{30}
D_{40} Iowa; Ran	D_{39} Ill. Ran	D_{38} Ga. Ran	D_{37} Del. Ran	D_{36}	D_{35}	D_{34}	D_{33}	D_{32}	D_{31}
D_{41} La. Ran	D_{42} Mass. Ran	D_{43} Mich. Ran	R_{44} Mo. (sp); Ran	D_{45} Mont. Ran	D_{46} R.I. Ran	D_{47} S.D. Ran	D_{48} W.Va. Ran	D_{49} N.J. Withdrew	I_{1}
↑ Plurality with Independent in caucus
R_{41} N.M. Ran	R_{42} Okla. Ran	R_{43} Ore. Ran	R_{44} Va. Ran	R_{45} Wyo. Ran	R_{46} N.C. Retired	R_{47} S.C. Retired	R_{48} Tenn. Retired	R_{49} Texas; Retired	IPM_{1} (Note: Senator caucused with neither party.); Minn. Retired (Note: DFL incumbent Paul Wellstone was renominated, but died in a plane crash on October 25, 2002. Dean Barkley was appointed on November 4, 2002, to finish the term.)
R_{40} N.H. Ran	R_{39} Neb. Ran	R_{38} Miss. Ran	R_{37} Me. Ran	R_{36} Ky. Ran	R_{35} Kan. Ran	R_{34} Idaho; Ran	R_{33} Colo. Ran	R_{32} Ark. Ran	R_{31} Alaska; Ran
R_{21}	R_{22}	R_{23}	R_{24}	R_{25}	R_{26}	R_{27}	R_{28}	R_{29}	R_{30} Ala. Ran
R_{20}	R_{19}	R_{18}	R_{17}	R_{16}	R_{15}	R_{14}	R_{13}	R_{12}	R_{11}
R_{1}	R_{2}	R_{3}	R_{4}	R_{5}	R_{6}	R_{7}	R_{8}	R_{9}	R_{10}

=== After the elections ===
D_{1}	D_{2}	D_{3}	D_{4}	D_{5}	D_{6}	D_{7}	D_{8}	D_{9}	D_{10}
D_{20}	D_{19}	D_{18}	D_{17}	D_{16}	D_{15}	D_{14}	D_{13}	D_{12}	D_{11}
D_{21}	D_{22}	D_{23}	D_{24}	D_{25}	D_{26}	D_{27}	D_{28}	D_{29}	D_{30}
D_{40} La. Re-elected	D_{39} Iowa; Re-elected	D_{38} Ill. Re-elected	D_{37} Del. Re-elected	D_{36}	D_{35}	D_{34}	D_{33}	D_{32}	D_{31}
D_{41} Mass. Re-elected	D_{42} Mich. Re-elected	D_{43} Mont. Re-elected	D_{44} N.J. Hold	D_{45} R.I. Re-elected	D_{46} S.D. Re-elected	D_{47} W.Va. Re-elected	D_{48} Ark. Gain	I_{1}	R_{51} Mo. (sp); Gain (Note: Appointee defeated)
Majority →									R_{51} Mo. (sp); Gain
R_{41} N.C. Hold	R_{42} Okla. Re-elected	R_{43} Ore. Re-elected	R_{44} S.C. Hold	R_{45} Tenn. Hold	R_{46} Texas; Hold	R_{47} Va. Re-elected	R_{48} Wyo. Re-elected	R_{49} Ga. Gain	R_{50} Minn. Gain
R_{40} N.M. Re-elected	R_{39} N.H. Hold	R_{38} Neb. Re-elected	R_{37} Miss. Re-elected	R_{36} Me. Re-elected	R_{35} Ky. Re-elected	R_{34} Kan. Re-elected	R_{33} Idaho; Re-elected	R_{32} Colo. Re-elected	R_{31} Alaska; Re-elected
R_{21}	R_{22}	R_{23}	R_{24}	R_{25}	R_{26}	R_{27}	R_{28}	R_{29}	R_{30} Ala. Re-elected
R_{20}	R_{19}	R_{18}	R_{17}	R_{16}	R_{15}	R_{14}	R_{13}	R_{12}	R_{11}
R_{1}	R_{2}	R_{3}	R_{4}	R_{5}	R_{6}	R_{7}	R_{8}	R_{9}	R_{10}

Key:

D_{#}	Democratic
I_{#}	Independent
IPM_{#}	Independence Party of Minnesota
R_{#}	Republican

== Gains, losses and holds ==
=== Retirements ===
Map of retirements: Republican incumbent Democratic incumbent Democratic incumbent withdrew Republican incumbent retired or lost renomination MN Independence incumbent retired

One Independence and four Republicans retired instead of seeking re-election.

State	Senator	Age at end of term	Assumed office	Replaced by	Ref
Minnesota	Dean Barkley	52	2002 (Note: Appointed to the seat following the death of Paul Wellstone a couple of weeks before the election.)	Norm Coleman	
North Carolina	Jesse Helms	81	1973	Elizabeth Dole	
South Carolina	Strom Thurmond	100	1954 (Note: Including an interrupted period in 1956.)	Lindsey Graham	
Tennessee	Fred Thompson	60	1994 (Note: Elected in the special election to finish Al Gore's term.)	Lamar Alexander	
Texas	Phil Gramm	60	1985	John Cornyn	

=== Nomination withdrawn ===
One Democrat was originally sought to run re-election but withdrew.

State	Senator	Age at end of term	Assumed office	Replaced by	Ref
New Jersey	Robert Torricelli	51	1997	Frank Lautenberg	

=== Defeats ===
Two Democrats and two Republicans sought re-election but lost in the primary or general election.

State	Senator	Age at end of term	Assumed office	Replaced by	Ref
Arkansas	Tim Hutchinson	53	1997	Mark Pryor	
Georgia	Max Cleland	60	1997	Saxby Chambliss	
Missouri (special)	Jean Carnahan	68	2001 (Note: Appointed to the seat at the start of her husband Mel Carnahan's term, who was posthumously elected in 2000.)	Jim Talent	
New Hampshire	Bob Smith	61	1990	John E. Sununu	

=== Post-election changes ===
One Republican resigned on December 2, 2002, and was replaced by a Republican appointee.

State	Senator	Replaced by
Alaska (Class 3)	Frank Murkowski	Lisa Murkowski

== Final pre-election predictions ==
Several sites and individuals published predictions of competitive seats. These predictions looked at factors such as the strength of the incumbent (if the incumbent was running for re-election) and the other candidates, and the state's partisan lean (reflected in part by the state's Cook Partisan Voting Index rating). The predictions assigned ratings to each seat, indicating the predicted advantage that a party had in winning that seat. Most election predictors used:

- "tossup": no advantage
- "tilt" (used by some predictors): advantage that is not quite as strong as "lean"
- "lean": slight advantage
- "likely": significant, but surmountable, advantage
- "safe" or "solid": near-certain chance of victory

Constituency	Incumbent		2002 election ratings	
State	Senator	Last election (Note: The last elections for this group of senators were in 1996, except for those elected in a special election or who were appointed after the resignation or passing of a sitting senator, as noted.)	Sabato's Crystal Ball	Result
Alabama	Jeff Sessions	52.45% R	Safe R	Sessions; 58.58% R
Alaska	Ted Stevens	76.71% R	Safe R	Stevens; 78.17% R
Arkansas	Tim Hutchinson	52.70% R	Lean D (flip)	Pryor; 53.86% D (flip)
Colorado	Wayne Allard	51.41% R	Lean R	Allard; 50.70% R
Delaware	Joe Biden	60.04% D	Safe D	Biden; 58.22% D
Georgia	Max Cleland	48.87% D	Lean D	Chambliss; 52.77% R (flip)
Idaho	Larry Craig	57.02% R	Safe R	Craig; 65.16% R
Illinois	Dick Durbin	56.09% D	Safe D	Durbin; 60.33% D
Iowa	Tom Harkin	51.81% D	Lean D	Harkin; 54.18% D
Kansas	Pat Roberts	62.02% R	Safe R	Roberts; 82.52% R
Kentucky	Mitch McConnell	55.45% R	Safe R	McConnell; 64.68% R
Louisiana	Mary Landrieu	50.17% D	Lean D	Landrieu; 51.70% D
Maine	Susan Collins	49.18% R	Likely R	Collins; 58.44% R
Massachusetts	John Kerry	52.21% D	Safe D	Kerry; 80.03% D
Michigan	Carl Levin	58.36% D	Safe D	Levin; 60.61% D
Minnesota	Dean Barkley (retiring)	Appointed (2002) (Note: DFL Paul Wellstone died on October 25, 2002, due to plane crash 11 days before the election, won in 1996 with 50.3% of the vote.)	Lean D (flip)	Coleman; 49.53% R (flip)
Mississippi	Thad Cochran	71.03% R	Safe R	Cochran; 84.58% R
Missouri	Jean Carnahan	Appointed (2001) (Note: Democrat Mel Carnahan died on October 16, 2000, due to plane crash having won posthumously with 50.4% of the vote.)	Lean R (flip)	Talent; 49.80% R (flip)
Montana	Max Baucus	49.56% D	Safe D	Baucus; 62.74% D
Nebraska	Chuck Hagel	56.14% R	Safe R	Hagel; 82.76% R
New Hampshire	Bob Smith (lost renomination)	49.25% R	Lean D (flip)	Sununu; 50.12% R
New Jersey	Bob Torricelli (withdrew)	52.12% D	Lean D	Lautenberg; 53.88% D
New Mexico	Pete Domenici	64.73% R	Safe R	Domenici; 65.03% R
North Carolina	Jesse Helms (retiring)	52.64% R	Lean R	Dole; 53.56% R
Oklahoma	Jim Inhofe	56.68% R	Likely R	Inhofe; 57.30% R
Oregon	Gordon Smith	49.80% R	Likely R	Smith; 56.21% R
Rhode Island	Jack Reed	63.31% D	Safe D	Reed; 78.43% D
South Carolina	Strom Thurmond (retiring)	53.38% R	Lean R	Graham; 54.40% R
South Dakota	Tim Johnson	51.32% D	Lean D	Johnson; 49.62% D
Tennessee	Fred Thompson (retiring)	61.37% R	Likely R	Alexander; 54.28% R
Texas	Phil Gramm (retiring)	54.78% R	Lean R	Cornyn; 55.30% R
Virginia	John Warner	52.48% R	Safe R	Warner; 82.58% R
West Virginia	Jay Rockefeller	76.65% D	Safe D	Rockefeller; 63.11% D
Wyoming	Mike Enzi	54.06% R	Safe R	Enzi; 72.95% R

== Race summary ==
=== Special elections during the 107th Congress ===
In these special elections, the winner was seated in the fall of 2002; ordered by election date, then state.

State	Incumbent			Result	Candidates
State	Senator	Party	Electoral history	Result	Candidates
Missouri (Class 1)	Jean Carnahan	Democratic	2001 (appointed)	Interim appointee lost election. New senator elected November 5, 2002. Republican gain.	▌ ✓ Jim Talent (Republican) 49.8%; ▌Jean Carnahan (Democratic) 48.7%; Others: ▌Tamara A. Millay (Libertarian) 1.0%; ▌Daniel Romano (Green) 0.6%

=== Elections leading to the next Congress ===
In these general elections, the winners were elected for the term beginning January 3, 2003; ordered by state.

All of the elections involved the Class 2 seats.

State	Incumbent			Result	Candidates
State	Senator	Party	Electoral history	Result	Candidates
Alabama	Jeff Sessions	Republican	1996	Incumbent re-elected.	▌ ✓ Jeff Sessions (Republican) 58.6%; ▌Susan Parker (Democratic) 39.8%; ▌Jeff Allen (Libertarian) 1.5%
Alaska	Ted Stevens	Republican	1968 (appointed); 1970 (special); 1972; 1978; 1984; 1990; 1996	Incumbent re-elected.	▌ ✓ Ted Stevens (Republican) 78%; ▌Frank J. Vondersaar (Democratic) 11%; ▌Jim Sykes (Green) 8%; ▌Jim Dore (Alaskan Independence) 3%; ▌Leonard Karpinski (Libertarian) 1%
Arkansas	Tim Hutchinson	Republican	1996	Incumbent lost re-election. Democratic gain.	▌ ✓ Mark Pryor (Democratic) 53.9%; ▌Tim Hutchinson (Republican) 46.1%
Colorado	Wayne Allard	Republican	1996	Incumbent re-elected.	▌ ✓ Wayne Allard (Republican) 50.7%; ▌Tom Strickland (Democratic) 45.8%; Others: ▌Douglas Campbell (Constitution) 1.5%; ▌Rick Stanley (Libertarian) 1.5%; ▌John Heckman (Concerns of People) 0.5%
Delaware	Joe Biden	Democratic	1972; 1978; 1984; 1990; 1996	Incumbent re-elected.	▌ ✓ Joe Biden (Democratic) 58.2%; ▌Raymond J. Clatworthy (Republican) 40.8%; Others: ▌Maurice Barros (Independence) 0.4%; ▌Raymond T. Buranello (Libertarian) 0.4%; ▌Robert E. Mattson (Natural Law) 0.2%
Georgia	Max Cleland	Democratic	1996	Incumbent lost re-election. Republican gain.	▌ ✓ Saxby Chambliss (Republican) 52.7%; ▌Max Cleland (Democratic) 45.9%; ▌Claude Thomas (Libertarian) 1.4%
Idaho	Larry Craig	Republican	1990; 1996	Incumbent re-elected.	▌ ✓ Larry Craig (Republican) 65%; ▌Alan Blinken (Democratic) 33%; ▌Donovan Bramwell (Libertarian) 2%
Illinois	Dick Durbin	Democratic	1996	Incumbent re-elected.	▌ ✓ Dick Durbin (Democratic) 60.3%; ▌Jim Durkin (Republican) 38%; ▌Steven Burgauer (Libertarian) 1.6%
Iowa	Tom Harkin	Democratic	1984; 1990; 1996	Incumbent re-elected.	▌ ✓ Tom Harkin (Democratic) 54.2%; ▌Greg Ganske (Republican) 43.8%; Others: ▌Tim Harthan (Green) 1.1%; ▌Richard J. Moore (Libertarian) 0.9%
Kansas	Pat Roberts	Republican	1996	Incumbent re-elected.	▌ ✓ Pat Roberts (Republican) 82.5%; ▌Steven A. Rosile (Libertarian) 9.1%; ▌George Cook (Reform) 8.4%
Kentucky	Mitch McConnell	Republican	1984; 1990; 1996	Incumbent re-elected.	▌ ✓ Mitch McConnell (Republican) 64.7%; ▌Lois Combs Weinberg (Democratic) 35.3%
Louisiana	Mary Landrieu	Democratic	1996	Incumbent re-elected.	▌ ✓ Mary Landrieu (Democratic) 51.7%; ▌Suzanne Haik Terrell (Republican) 48.3%
Maine	Susan Collins	Republican	1996	Incumbent re-elected.	▌ ✓ Susan Collins (Republican) 58.4%; ▌Chellie Pingree (Democratic) 41.6%
Massachusetts	John Kerry	Democratic	1984; 1990; 1996	Incumbent re-elected.	▌ ✓ John Kerry (Democratic) 72.3%; ▌Michael E. Cloud (Libertarian) 16.6%; Others: ▌Randall Forsberg (write-in) 1.1%; Other 0.3%; Blank/Scattering 9.6%
Michigan	Carl Levin	Democratic	1978; 1984; 1990; 1996	Incumbent re-elected.	▌ ✓ Carl Levin (Democratic) 60.6%; ▌Rocky Raczkowski (Republican) 37.9%; Others: ▌Eric Borregard (Green) 0.8%; ▌John S. Mangopoulos (Reform) 0.4%; ▌Doug Dern (Natural Law) 0.3%
Minnesota	Dean Barkley	Independence	2002 (appointed)	Interim appointee ineligible to run. Republican gain.	▌ ✓ Norm Coleman (Republican) 49.5%; ▌Walter Mondale (DFL) 47.3%; Others: ▌Jim Moore (Independence) 2.0%; ▌Paul Wellstone (DFL) 0.5%; ▌Ray Tricomo (Green) 0.4%; ▌Miro Drago Kovatchevich (Constitution) 0.1%
Mississippi	Thad Cochran	Republican	1978; 1984; 1990; 1996	Incumbent re-elected.	▌ ✓ Thad Cochran (Republican) 85.6%; ▌Shawn O'Hara (Reform) 15.4%
Montana	Max Baucus	Democratic	1978; 1984; 1990; 1996	Incumbent re-elected.	▌ ✓ Max Baucus (Democratic) 62.7%; ▌Mike Taylor (Republican) 31.7%; ▌Stan Jones (Libertarian) 3.2%; ▌Bob Kelleher (Green) 2.3%
Nebraska	Chuck Hagel	Republican	1996	Incumbent re-elected.	▌ ✓ Chuck Hagel (Republican) 82.8%; ▌Charlie A. Matulka (Democratic) 14.6%; Others: ▌John J. Graziano (Libertarian) 1.5%; ▌Phil Chase (Independent) 1.1%
New Hampshire	Bob Smith	Republican	1990; 1996	Incumbent lost renomination. Republican hold.	▌ ✓ John E. Sununu (Republican) 50.8%; ▌Jeanne Shaheen (Democratic) 46.4%; ▌Ken Blevens (Libertarian) 2.2%
New Jersey	Robert Torricelli	Democratic	1996	Incumbent renominated but withdrew. Democratic hold.	▌ ✓ Frank Lautenberg (Democratic) 53.9%; ▌Douglas Forrester (Republican) 44%; Others: ▌Ted Glick (Green) 1.2%; ▌Elizabeth Macron (Libertarian) 0.6%; ▌Norman E. Wahner (NJ Conservative) 0.3%; ▌Greg Pason (Socialist) 0.1%
New Mexico	Pete Domenici	Republican	1972; 1978; 1984; 1990; 1996	Incumbent re-elected.	▌ ✓ Pete Domenici (Republican) 65%; ▌Gloria Tristani (Democratic) 35%
North Carolina	Jesse Helms	Republican	1972; 1978; 1984; 1990; 1996	Incumbent retired. Republican hold.	▌ ✓ Elizabeth Dole (Republican) 53.6%; ▌Erskine Bowles (Democratic) 45%; ▌Sean Haugh (Libertarian) 1.5%
Oklahoma	Jim Inhofe	Republican	1994 (special); 1996	Incumbent re-elected.	▌ ✓ Jim Inhofe (Republican) 57.3%; ▌David Walters (Democratic) 36.3%; ▌James Germalic (Independent) 6.4%
Oregon	Gordon H. Smith	Republican	1996	Incumbent re-elected.	▌ ✓ Gordon H. Smith (Republican) 56.2%; ▌Bill Bradbury (Democratic) 39.6%; Others: ▌Dan Fitzgerald (Libertarian) 2.4%; ▌Lon Mabon (Constitution) 1.7%
Rhode Island	Jack Reed	Democratic	1996	Incumbent re-elected.	▌ ✓ Jack Reed (Democratic) 78.4%; ▌Robert Tingle (Republican) 21.6%
South Carolina	Strom Thurmond	Republican	1954 (write-in) (Note: Senator Strom Thurmond was originally elected as a Democrat in 1954, but as a write-in candidate, a special election in 1956 and 1960 before switching to a Republican in 1964. Thurmond won re-election as a Republican in 1966, 1972, 1978, 1984, 1990 and 1996.); 1954 (appointed); 1956 (resigned); 1956 (special); 1960; 1966; 1972; 1978; 1984; 1990; 1996	Incumbent retired. Republican hold.	▌ ✓ Lindsey Graham (Republican) 54.4%; ▌Alex Sanders (Democratic) 44.2%; Others: ▌Ted Adams (Constitution) 0.8%; ▌Victor Kocher (Libertarian) 0.6%
South Dakota	Tim Johnson	Democratic	1996	Incumbent re-elected.	▌ ✓ Tim Johnson (Democratic) 49.6%; ▌John Thune (Republican) 49.5%; ▌Kurt Evans (Libertarian) 0.9%
Tennessee	Fred Thompson	Republican	1994 (special); 1996	Incumbent retired. Republican hold.	▌ ✓ Lamar Alexander (Republican) 54%; ▌Bob Clement (Democratic) 44%
Texas	Phil Gramm	Republican	1984; 1990; 1996	Incumbent retired. Republican hold. Incumbent resigned November 30, 2002, to give Cornyn preferential seniority. Winner appointed December 2, 2002.	▌ ✓ John Cornyn (Republican) 55.3%; ▌Ron Kirk (Democratic) 43.3%; Others: ▌Scott Jameson (Libertarian) 0.8%; ▌Roy H. Williams (Green) 0.6%
Virginia	John Warner	Republican	1978; 1984; 1990; 1996	Incumbent re-elected.	▌ ✓ John Warner (Republican) 82.6%; ▌Nancy Spannaus (Independent) 9.7%; ▌Jacob Hornberger (Independent) 7.1%
West Virginia	Jay Rockefeller	Democratic	1984; 1990; 1996	Incumbent re-elected.	▌ ✓ Jay Rockefeller (Democratic) 63.1%; ▌Jay Wolfe (Republican) 36.9%
Wyoming	Mike Enzi	Republican	1996	Incumbent re-elected.	▌ ✓ Mike Enzi (Republican) 73%; ▌Joyce Corcoran (Democratic) 27%

== Closest races ==
In eleven races, the margin of victory was under 10%.

District	Winner	Margin
South Dakota	Democratic	0.16%
Missouri (special)	Republican (flip)	1.1%
Minnesota	Republican (flip)	2.2% (Note: Minnesota was the "tipping point" state.)
Louisiana	Democratic	3.4%
New Hampshire	Republican	4.4%
Colorado	Republican	4.9%
Georgia	Republican (flip)	6.9%
Arkansas	Democratic (flip)	7.0%
North Carolina	Republican	8.6%
Tennessee	Republican	9.9%
New Jersey	Democratic	9.9%

== Alabama ==
Alabama election
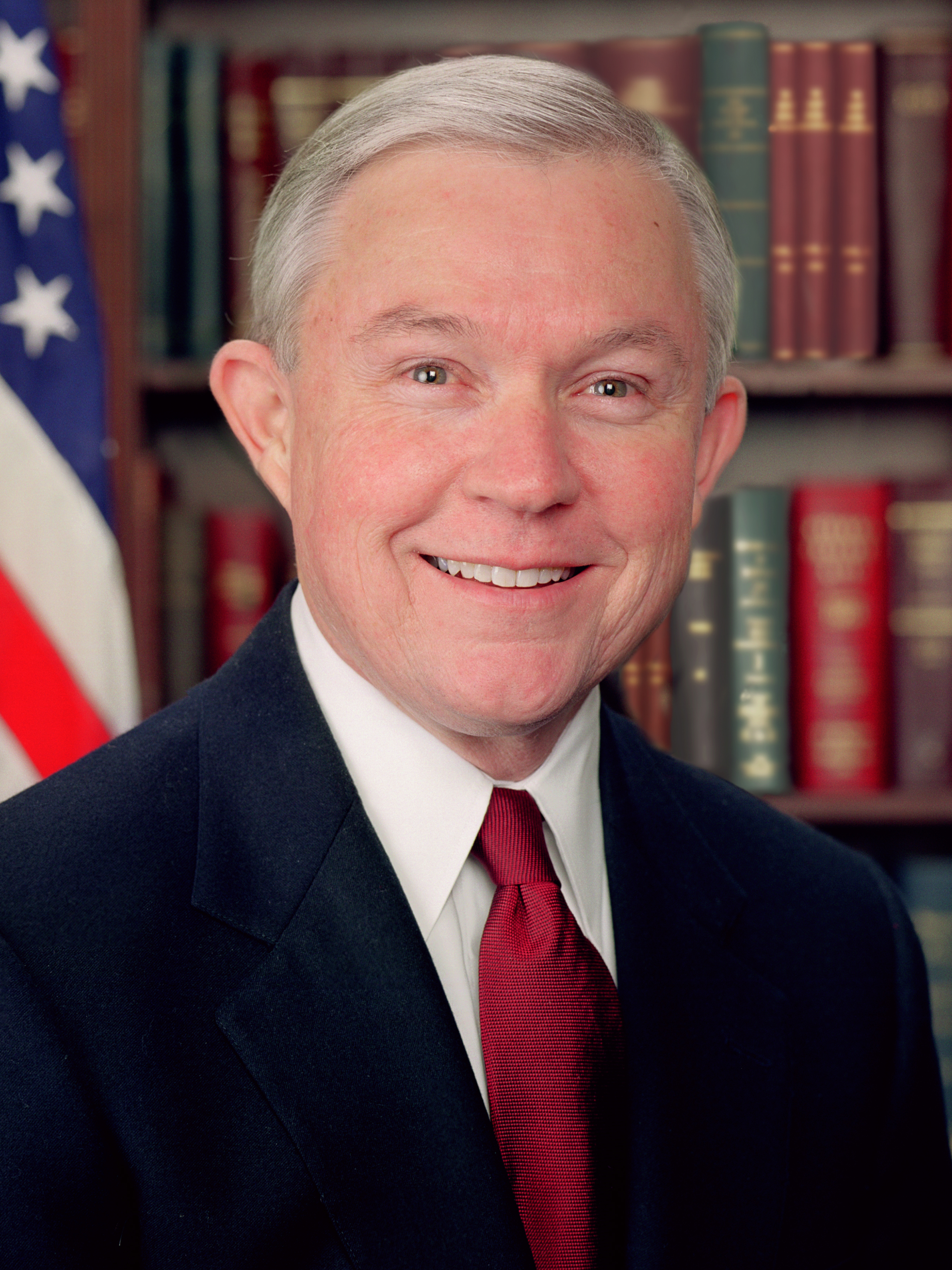
Nominee	Jeff Sessions	Susan Parker
Party	Republican	Democratic
Popular vote	792,561	538,878
Percentage	58.6%	39.8%
- County results Sessions: 50–60% 60–70% 70–80% Parker: 40–50% 50–60% 60–70% 70–80% 80–90%
U.S. senator before election
Jeff Sessions
Republican
Elected U.S. Senator
Jeff Sessions
Republican

Since around 1980, Alabama voters had increasingly voted for Republican candidates at the federal level, especially in presidential elections. By contrast, Democratic candidates had been elected to many state-level offices and comprised a longstanding majority in the Alabama Legislature.

Incumbent Republican Jeff Sessions was not challenged in the primary, and comfortably won re-election to a second term over State Auditor Susan Parker.

Sessions was not challenged in the primary.

Democratic primary results
Party	Candidate	Votes	%
Democratic	Susan Parker	190,978	47.99%
Democratic	Julian L. McPhillips	170,222	42.78%
Democratic	Wayne Sowell	36,719	9.23%
Total votes		397,919	100.00%

McPhillips received a large amount of support in the southern part of the state, but Parker won the most votes. Sowell endorsed Parker for the runoff.

Democratic primary runoff: June 25, 2002
Party	Candidate	Votes	%
Democratic	Susan Parker	176,708	65.15%
Democratic	Julian L. McPhillips	94,540	34.85%
Total votes		271,248	100.00%

General election
Party	Candidate	Votes	%	±%
Republican	Jeff Sessions (incumbent)	792,561	58.58%	+6.13%
Democratic	Susan Parker	538,878	39.83%	−5.63%
Libertarian	Jeff Allen	20,234	1.50%	+.06%
No party	Write-in votes	1,350	0.10%	+.06%
Majority		253,683	18.75%	
Turnout		1,353,023		
Republican hold		Swing		

== Alaska ==
Alaska election
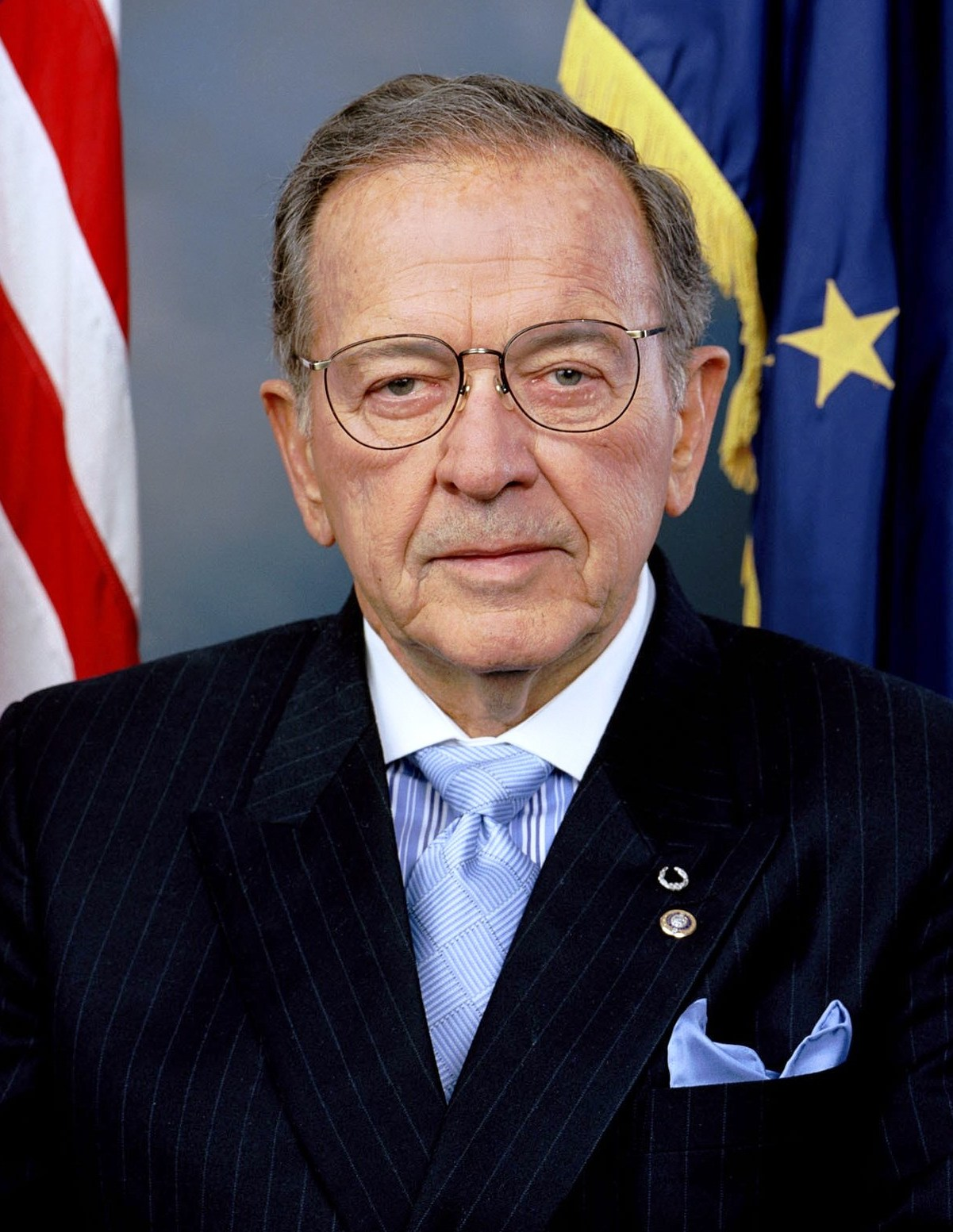

Nominee	Ted Stevens	Frank Vondersaar
Party	Republican	Democratic
Popular vote	179,438	24,133
Percentage	78.17%	10.51%
Nominee	Jim Sykes
Party	Green
Popular vote	16,608
Percentage	7.24%
- Results by state house district Stevens: 60–70% 70–80% 80–90%
U.S. senator before election
Ted Stevens
Republican
Elected U.S. Senator
Ted Stevens
Republican

Incumbent Ted Stevens ran for and won a seventh term. He faced perennial candidate Frank Vondersaar, the Democratic nominee, journalist Jim Sykes, the Green Party nominee, and several other independent candidates in his bid for re-election. Ultimately, Stevens crushed his opponents to win what would be his last term in the Senate. He won with the largest margin of victory of any Senate election in Alaska, as well as the highest percentage of the vote in any of his elections.

United States Senate election in Alaska, 2002
Party	Candidate	Votes	%	±%
Republican	Ted Stevens (incumbent)	179,438	78.17%	+1.46%
Democratic	Frank Vondersaar	24,133	10.51%	+0.17%
Green	Jim Sykes	16,608	7.24%	−5.29%
Independence	Jim Dore	6,724	2.93%	
Libertarian	Leonard Karpinski	2,354	1.03%	
Write-ins		291	0.13%	
Majority		155,305	67.66%	+3.47%
Turnout		229,548		
Republican hold		Swing		

== Arkansas ==
Arkansas election
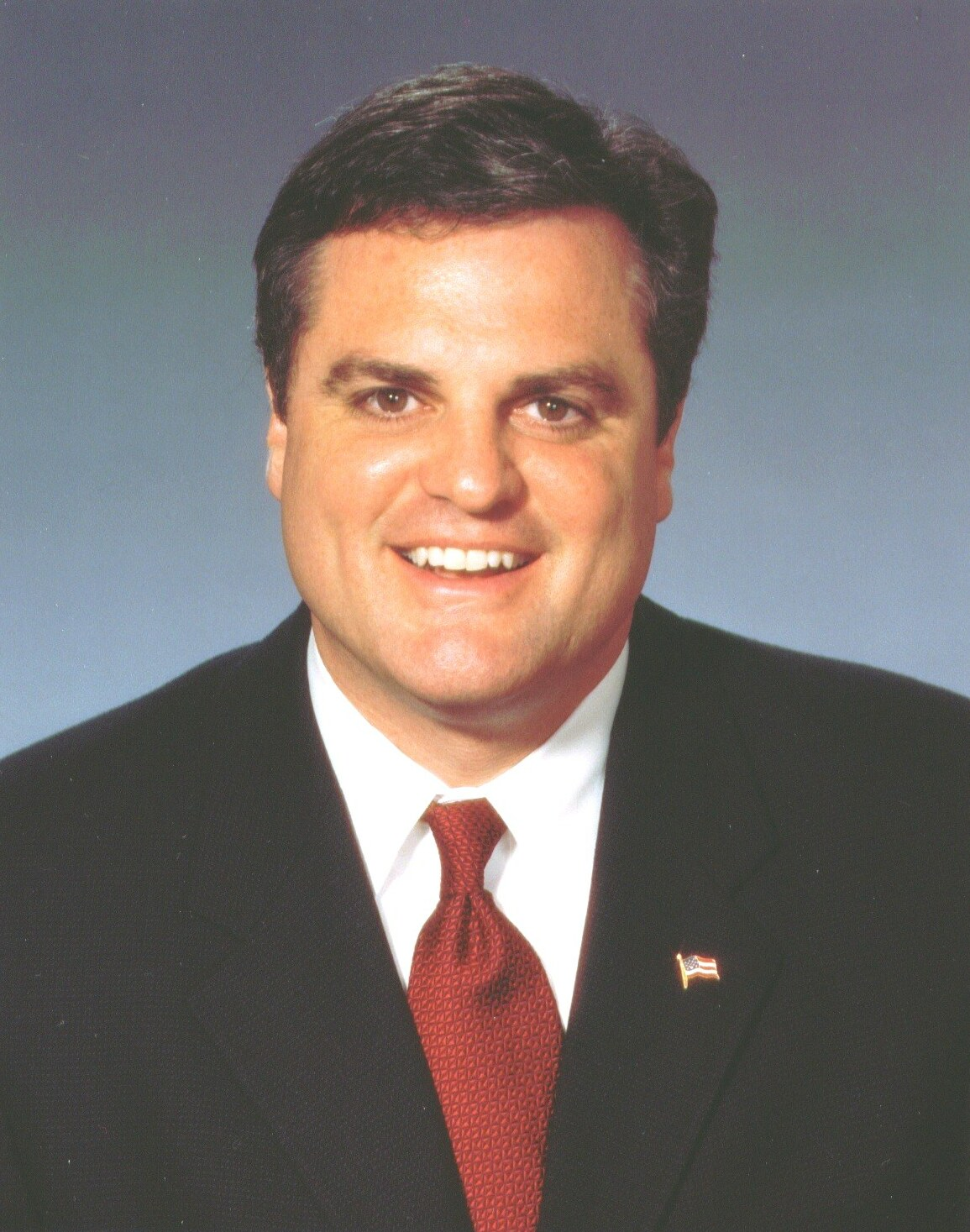

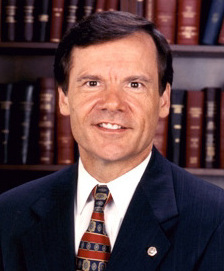
Nominee	Mark Pryor	Tim Hutchinson
Party	Democratic	Republican
Popular vote	433,306	370,653
Percentage	53.90%	46.10%
- County results Pryor: 50–60% 60–70% 70–80% Hutchinson: 50–60% 60–70%
U.S. senator before election
Tim Hutchinson
Republican
Elected U.S. Senator
Mark Pryor
Democratic

Incumbent Republican Tim Hutchinson ran for a second term, but lost re-election to Arkansas Attorney General Mark Pryor.

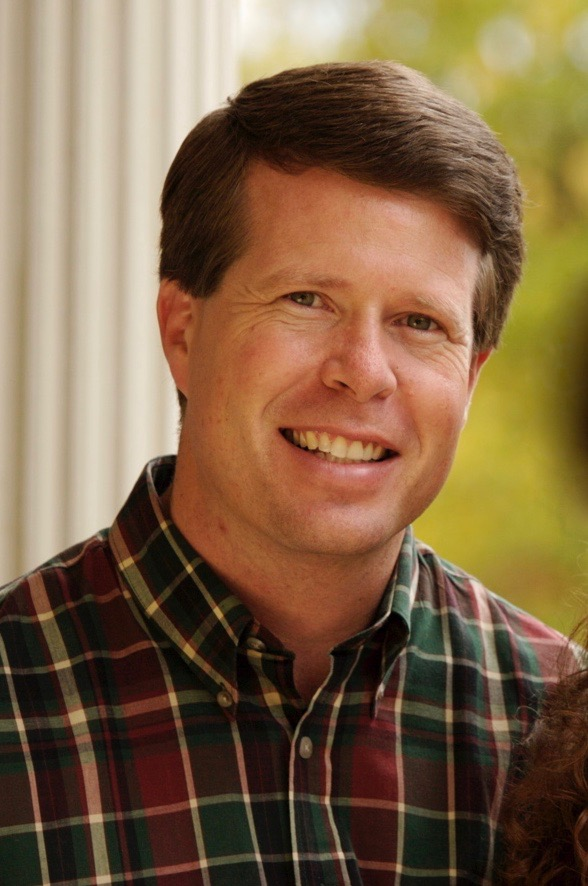
Republican State Representative Jim Bob Duggar challenged incumbent Tim Hutchinson in the primary.

Republican primary results
Party	Candidate	Votes	%
Republican	Tim Hutchinson	71,576	77.7%
Republican	Jim Bob Duggar	20,546	22.3%
Total votes		92,116	100.0%

Arkansas U.S. Senate election 2002
Party	Candidate	Votes	%
Democratic	Mark Pryor	435,347	53.9%
Republican	Tim Hutchinson (incumbent)	372,909	46.1%
Democratic gain from Republican			

== Colorado ==
Colorado election
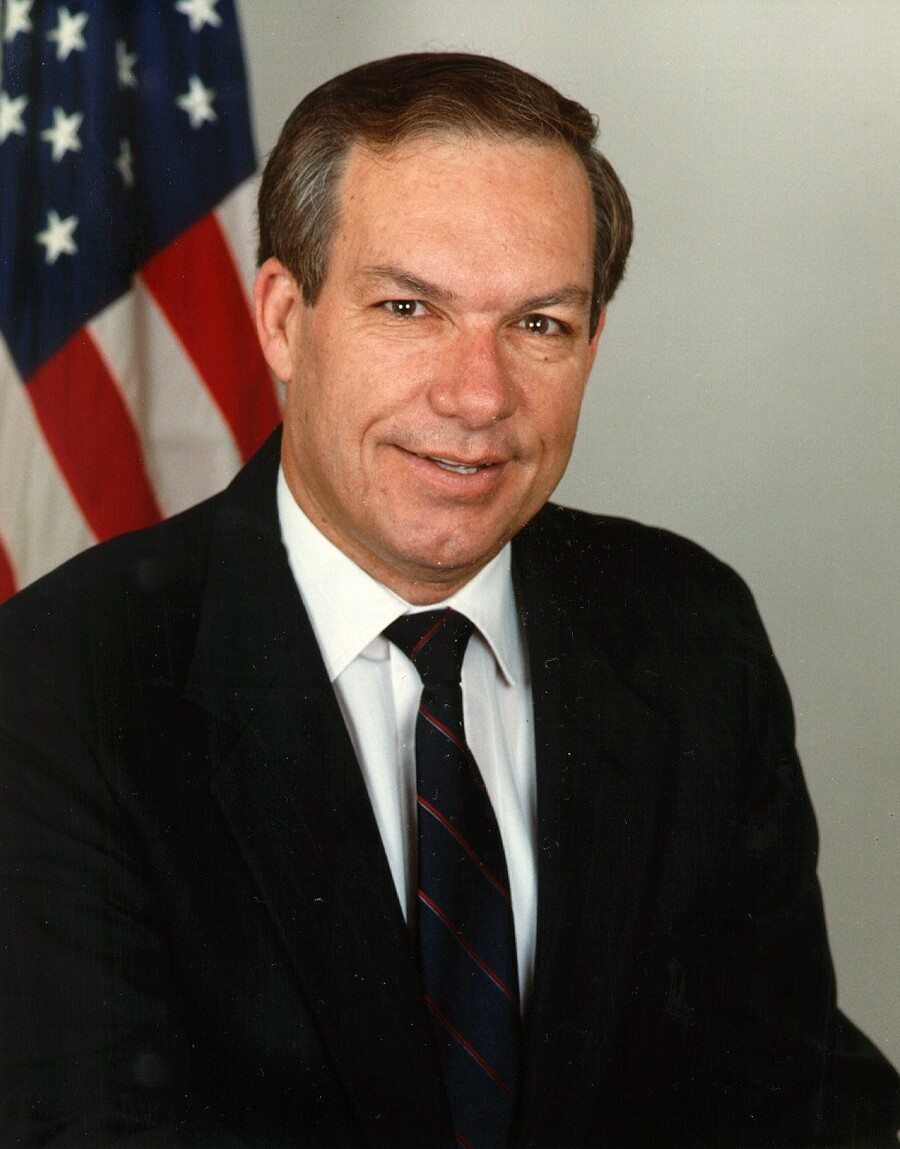

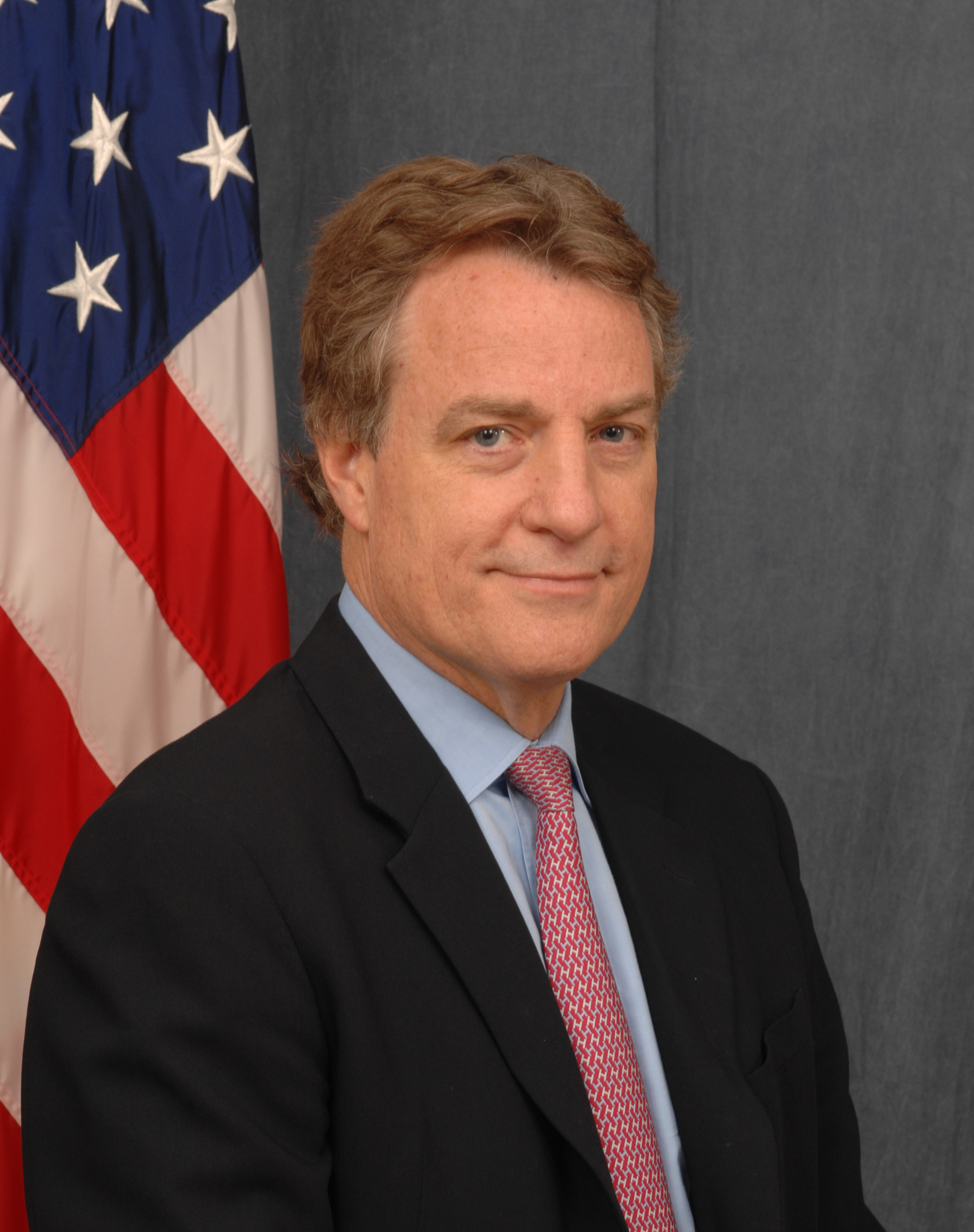
Nominee	Wayne Allard	Tom Strickland
Party	Republican	Democratic
Popular vote	717,893	648,130
Percentage	50.7%	45.8%
- County results Allard: 40–50% 50–60% 60–70% 70–80% Strickland: 40–50% 50–60% 60–70%
U.S. senator before election
Wayne Allard
Republican
Elected U.S. Senator
Wayne Allard
Republican

Incumbent Republican Wayne Allard won re-election to a second term over former U.S. attorney Tom Strickland.

Democratic primary results
Party	Candidate	Votes	%
Democratic	Tom Strickland	110,309	100.00%
Total votes		110,309	100.00%

Republican primary results
Party	Candidate	Votes	%
Republican	Wayne Allard (incumbent)	190,250	100.00%
Total votes		190,250	100.00%

General election
Party	Candidate	Votes	%	±%
Republican	Wayne Allard (incumbent)	717,899	50.70%	−0.71%
Democratic	Tom Strickland	648,130	45.77%	+0.03%
Constitution	Douglas Campbell	21,547	1.52%	
Libertarian	Rick Stanley	20,776	1.47%	
Independent	John Heckman	7,140	0.50%	
Write-ins		596	0.04%	
Majority		69,763	4.93%	−0.74%
Turnout		1,416,082		
Republican hold		Swing		

== Delaware ==
Delaware election
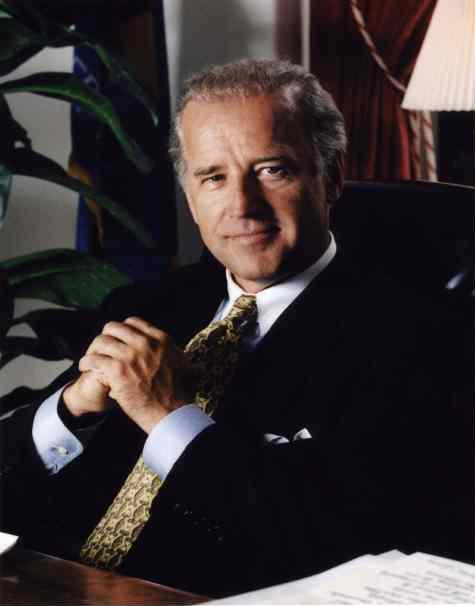

Nominee	Joe Biden	Raymond Clatworthy
Party	Democratic	Republican
Popular vote	135,253	94,793
Percentage	58.2%	40.8%
- County results Biden: 50–60% 60–70% Clatworthy: 50–60%
U.S. senator before election
Joe Biden
Democratic
Elected U.S. Senator
Joe Biden
Democratic

Incumbent Democrat Joe Biden comfortably won re-election to a sixth term.

General election
Party	Candidate	Votes	%	±%
Democratic	Joe Biden (incumbent)	135,253	58.22%	−1.82%
Republican	Raymond J. Clatworthy	94,793	40.80%	+2.67%
Independent Party	Maurice Barros	996	0.43%	
Libertarian	Raymond T. Buranello	922	0.40%	−0.82%
Natural Law	Robert E. Mattson	350	0.15%	−0.47%
Majority		40,460	17.42%	−4.49%
Turnout		232,314		
Democratic hold		Swing		

== Georgia ==
Georgia election
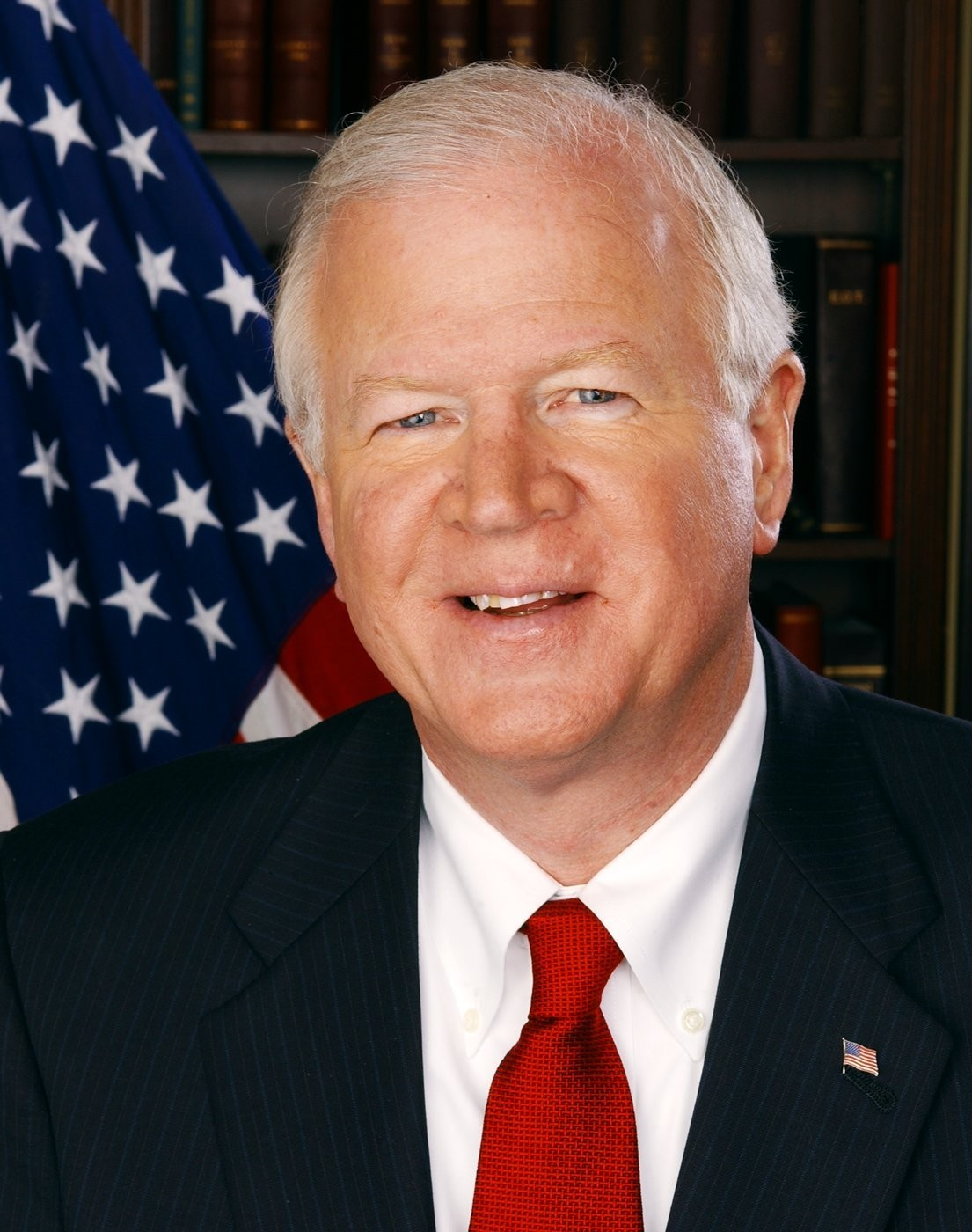

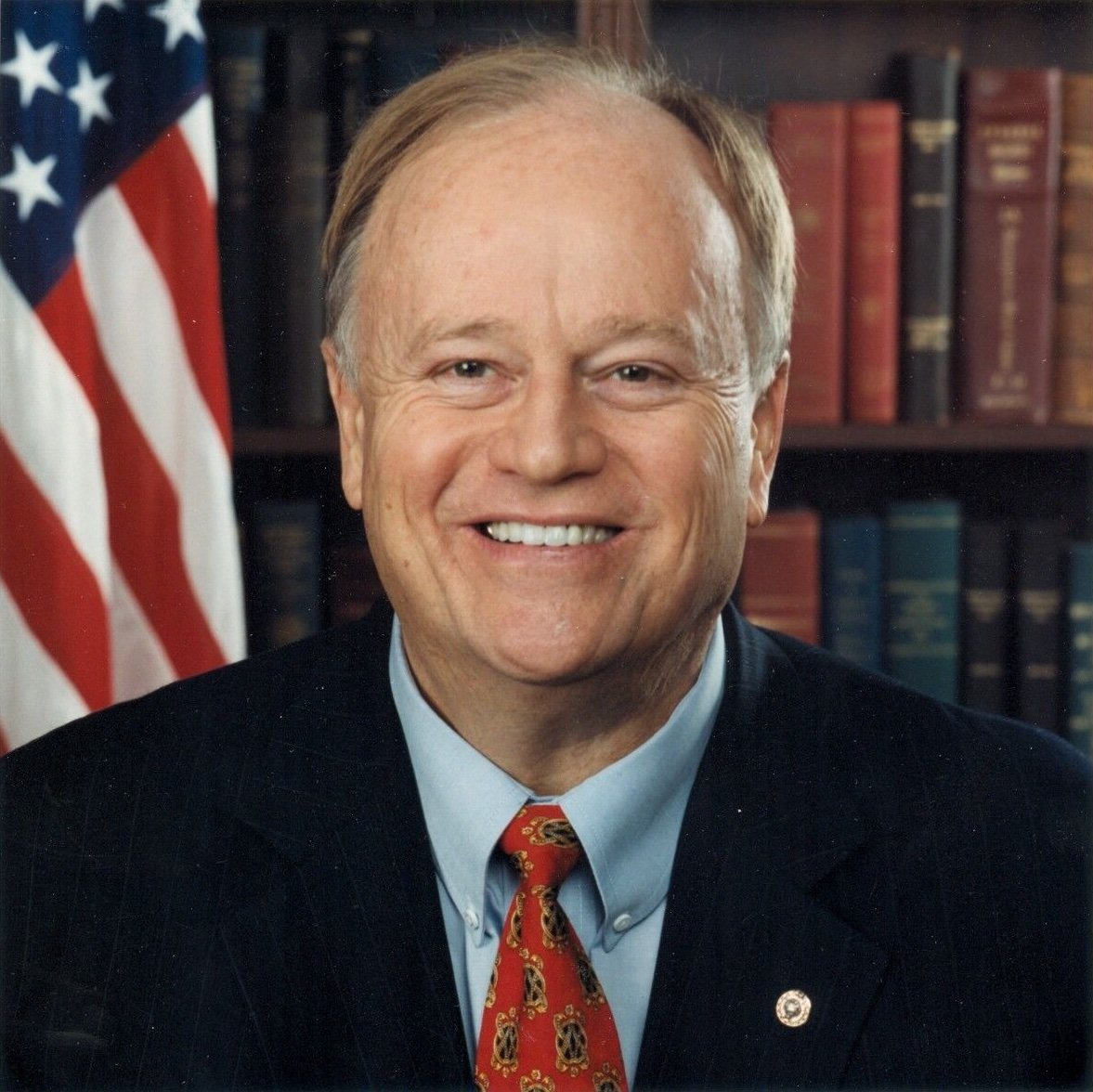
Nominee	Saxby Chambliss	Max Cleland
Party	Republican	Democratic
Popular vote	1,071,153	931,857
Percentage	52.8%	45.9%
- Chambliss: 40–50% 50–60% 60–70% 70–80% Cleland: 40–50% 50–60% 60–70% 70–80%
U.S. senator before election
Max Cleland
Democratic
Elected U.S. Senator
Saxby Chambliss
Republican

Incumbent Democrat Max Cleland ran for re-election to a second term, but lost to Republican U.S. Representative Saxby Chambliss.

Chambliss's campaign used themes of national defense and security, but drew criticism for television ads that paired images of Cleland and Osama bin Laden and Saddam Hussein, and for questioning the commitment to homeland security of his opponent, a triple amputee and decorated Vietnam veteran. Republican Senator John McCain of Arizona said of one ad: "It's worse than disgraceful. It's reprehensible." McCain, along with Republican Senator Chuck Hagel of Nebraska, made significant complaints to the Republican National Committee until the ads were taken down. Nevertheless, Chambliss defeated Cleland by nearly seven percentage points.

General election
Party	Candidate	Votes	%	±%
Republican	Saxby Chambliss	1,071,153	52.8%	
Democratic	Max Cleland (incumbent)	931,857	45.9%	
Libertarian	Claude Thomas	26,981	1.3%	
Majority		139,296	6.9%	
Turnout		2,029,991	100.0%	
Republican gain from Democratic		Swing		

== Idaho ==
Idaho election
- November 4, 2002
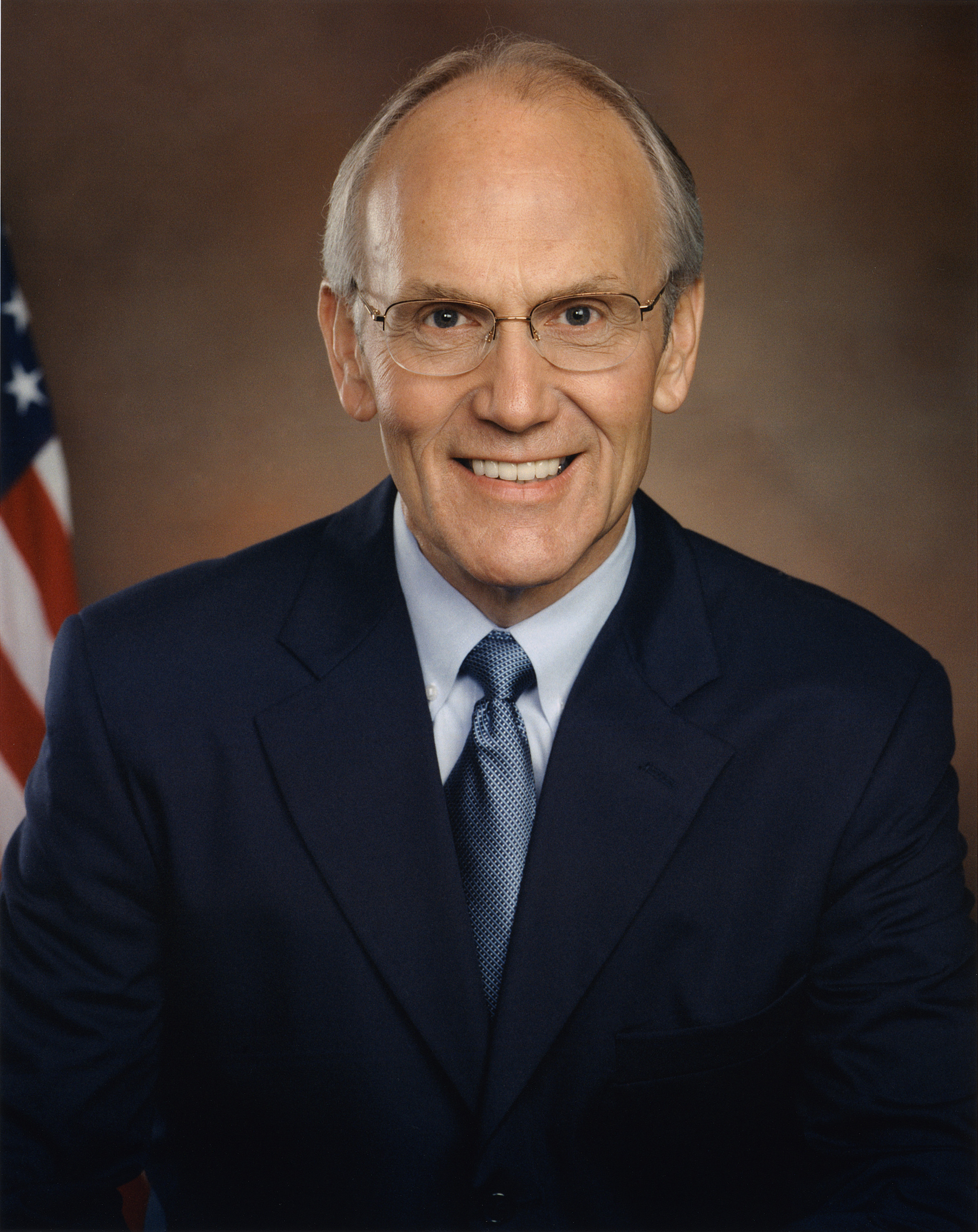

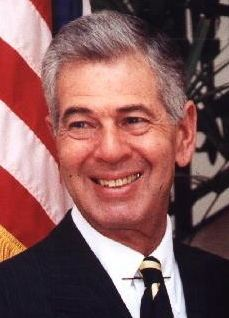
Nominee	Larry Craig	Alan Blinken
Party	Republican	Democratic
Popular vote	266,215	132,975
Percentage	65.2%	32.6%
- County results Craig: 50–60% 60–70% 70–80% 80–90% Blinken: 50–60%
U.S. senator before election
Larry Craig
Republican
Elected U.S. Senator
Larry Craig
Republican

Incumbent Republican Larry Craig easily won re-election to a third term over former U.S. ambassador to Belgium Alan Blinken.

Democratic primary results
Party	Candidate	Votes	%
Democratic	Alan Blinken	26,346	70.90%
Democratic	Dave Sneddon	10,812	29.10%
Total votes		37,158	100.00%

Libertarian primary results
Party	Candidate	Votes	%
Libertarian	Donovan Bramwell	1,179	100.00%
Total votes		1,179	100.00%

Republican primary results
Party	Candidate	Votes	%
Republican	Larry Craig (incumbent)	130,126	100.00%
Total votes		130,126	100.00%

General election
Party	Candidate	Votes	%	±%
Republican	Larry Craig (incumbent)	266,215	65.16%	+8.14%
Democratic	Alan Blinken	132,975	32.55%	−7.36%
Libertarian	Donovan Bramwell	9,354	2.29%	
Majority		133,240	32.61%	+15.50%
Turnout		408,544		
Republican hold		Swing		

== Illinois ==
Illinois election
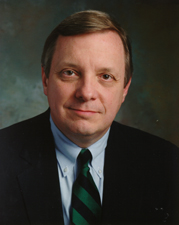

Nominee	Dick Durbin	Jim Durkin
Party	Democratic	Republican
Popular vote	2,103,766	1,325,703
Percentage	60.33%	38.02%
- County results Durbin: 40–50% 50–60% 60–70% 70–80% Durkin: 40–50% 50–60% 60–70%
U.S. senator before election
Dick Durbin
Democratic
Elected U.S. Senator
Dick Durbin
Democratic

Incumbent Democrat Dick Durbin won re-election to a second term. Durbin faced off against state Representative and future Illinois House minority leader Jim Durkin, whom he was able to beat, ensuring his return to the Senate.

Democratic primary results
Party	Candidate	Votes	%
Democratic	Dick Durbin (incumbent)	918,467	100.00%
Total votes		918,467	100.00%

Republican primary results
Party	Candidate	Votes	%
Republican	Jim Durkin	378,010	45.81%
Republican	Jim Oberweis	259,515	31.45%
Republican	John H. Cox	187,706	22.74%
Total votes		825,231	100.00%

Durbin won re-election to a second term easily, carrying a majority of the state's 102 counties.

General election
Party	Candidate	Votes	%	±%
Democratic	Dick Durbin (incumbent)	2,103,766	60.33%	+4.25%
Republican	Jim Durkin	1,325,703	38.02%	−2.65%
Libertarian	Steven Burgauer	57,382	1.65%	+0.68%
Majority		778,063	22.31%	+6.90%
Turnout		3,486,851		
Democratic hold		Swing		

== Iowa ==
Iowa election
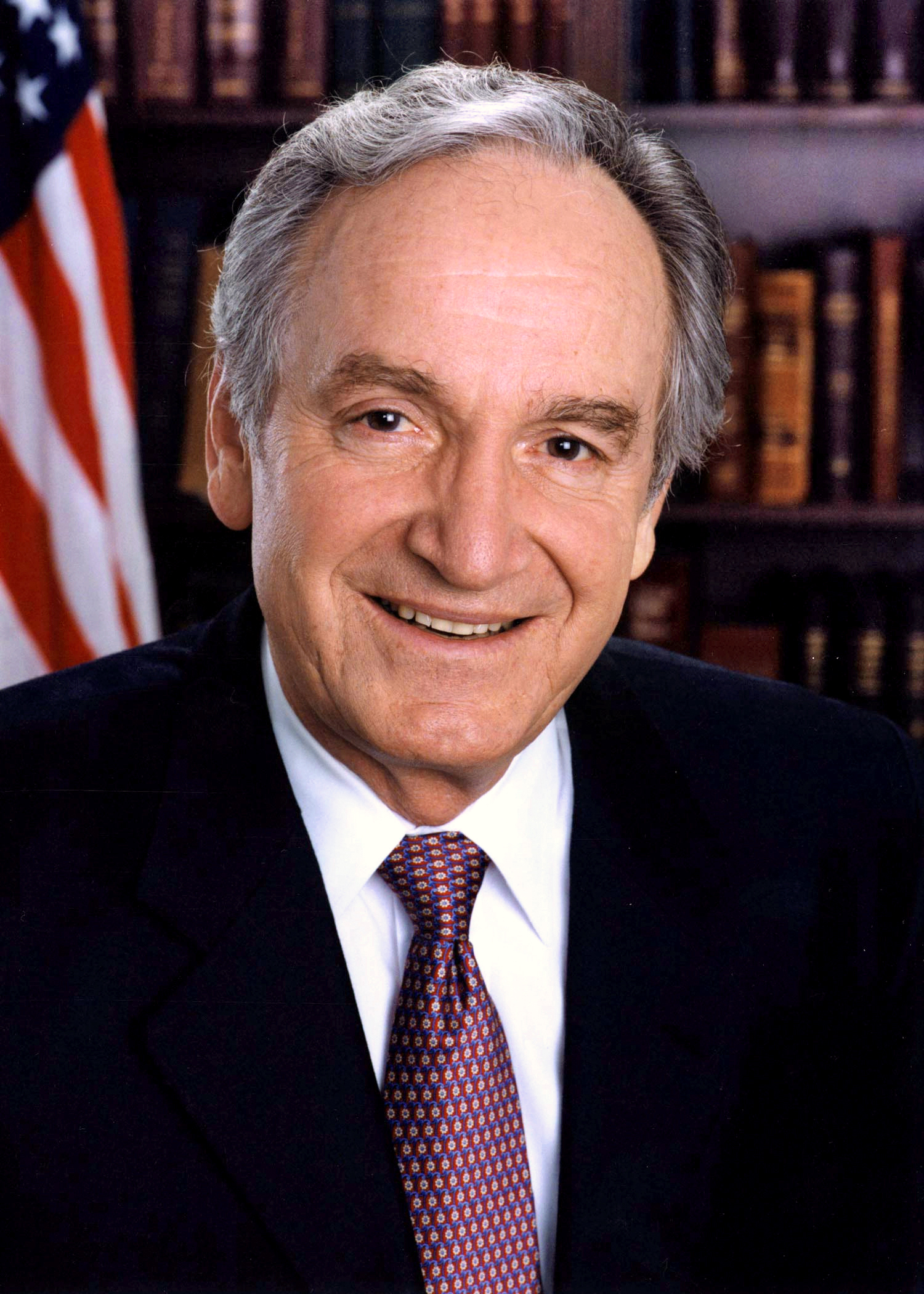

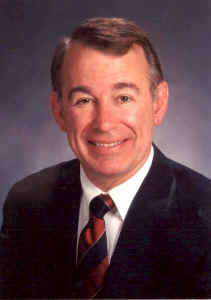
Nominee	Tom Harkin	Greg Ganske
Party	Democratic	Republican
Popular vote	554,278	447,892
Percentage	54.18%	43.78%
- County results Harkin: 40–50% 50–60% 60–70% Ganske: 40-50% 50-60% 60-70% 80-90%
Senator before election
Tom Harkin
Democratic
Elected Senator
Tom Harkin
Democratic

Incumbent Democrat Tom Harkin won re-election to a fourth term. Harkin was opposed in the general election by United States Congressman Greg Ganske, who fought off a surprisingly difficult challenger in the Republican primary. Though Harkin had narrowly defeated his opponent six years earlier, he was able to defeat Ganske by a fairly comfortable margin.

Democratic primary results
Party	Candidate	Votes	%
Democratic	Tom Harkin (incumbent)	83,505	99.34%
Democratic	Write-ins	555	0.66%
Total votes		84,060	100.00%

Republican primary results
Party	Candidate	Votes	%
Republican	Greg Ganske	116,229	58.97%
Republican	Bill Salier	80,700	40.95%
Republican	Write-ins	167	0.08%
Total votes		197,096	100.00%

General election
Party	Candidate	Votes	%	±%
Democratic	Tom Harkin (incumbent)	554,278	54.18%	+2.37%
Republican	Greg Ganske	447,892	43.78%	−2.94%
Green	Timothy A. Harthan	11,340	1.11%	
Libertarian	Richard J. Moore	8,864	0.87%	
Write-ins		701	0.06%	
Majority		106,386	10.40%	+5.30%
Turnout		1,023,075		
Democratic hold		Swing		

== Kansas ==
Kansas election
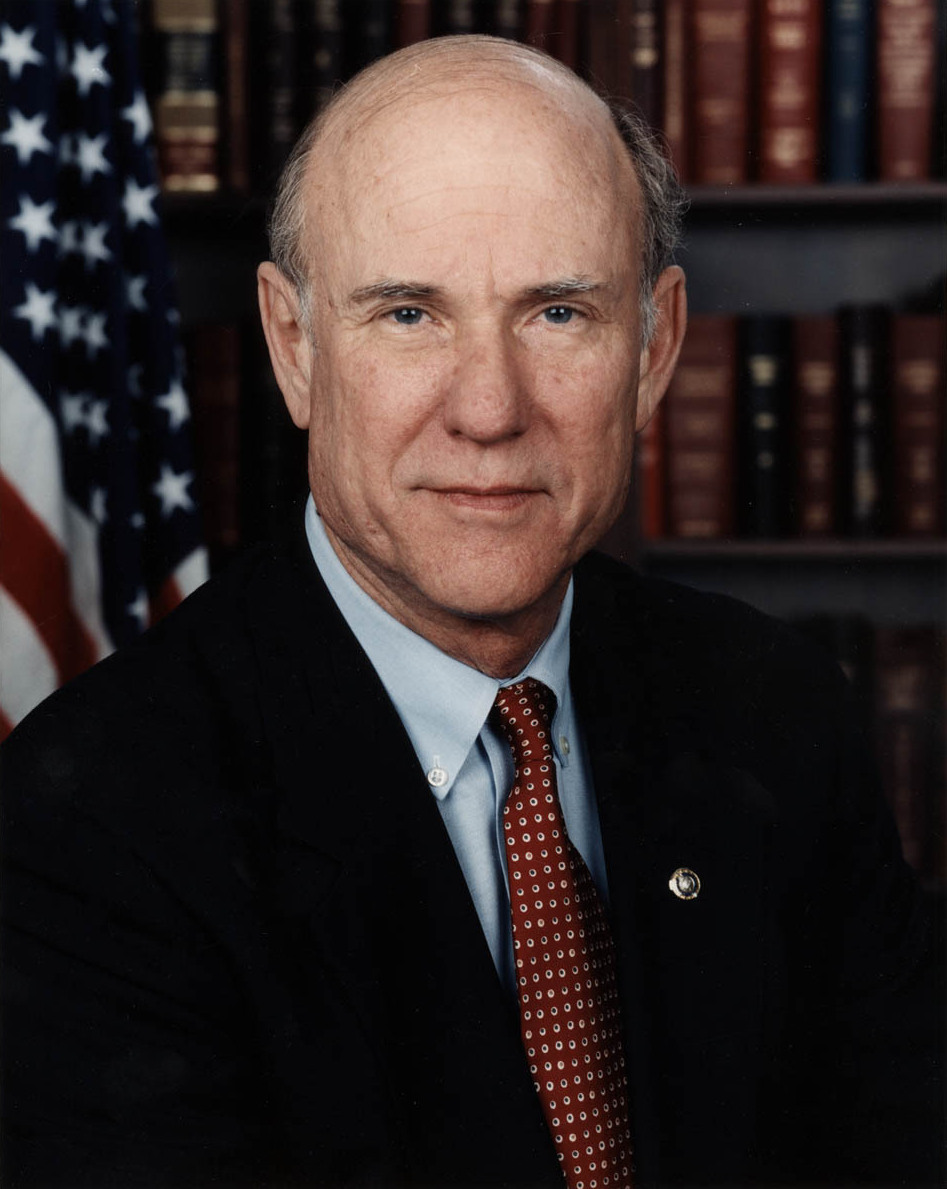

Nominee	Pat Roberts	Steven Rosile	George Cook
Party	Republican	Libertarian	Reform
Popular vote	641,075	70,725	65,050
Percentage	82.5%	9.1%	8.4%
- County results Roberts: 50–60% 70–80% 80–90% >90%
U.S. senator before election
Pat Roberts
Republican
Elected U.S. Senator
Pat Roberts
Republican

Incumbent Pat Roberts won re-election to a second term overwhelmingly because no Democrat filed to run.

Republican primary results
Party	Candidate	Votes	%
Republican	Pat Roberts (incumbent)	233,642	83.70%
Republican	Tom Oyler	45,491	16.30%
Total votes		279,133	100.00%

General election
Party	Candidate	Votes	%	±%
Republican	Pat Roberts (incumbent)	641,075	82.52%	+20.50%
Libertarian	Steven Rosile	70,725	9.10%	+7.86%
Reform	George Cook	65,050	8.37%	+6.08%
Majority		570,350	73.42%	+45.83%
Turnout		776,850		
Republican hold		Swing		

== Kentucky ==
Kentucky election
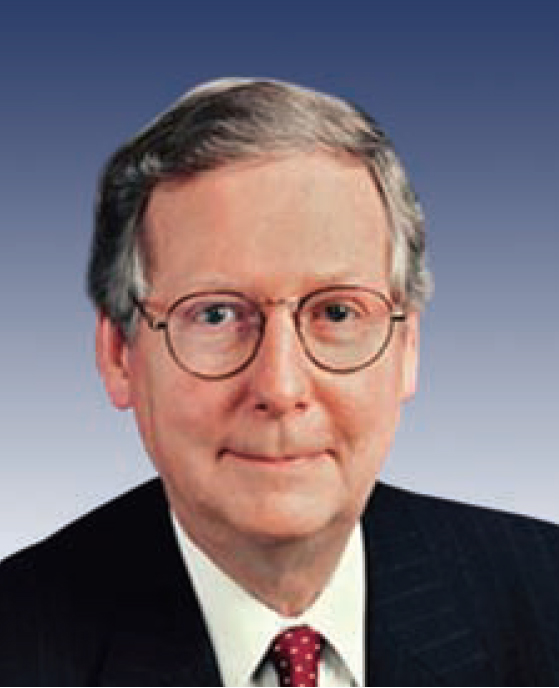

Nominee	Mitch McConnell	Lois Combs Weinberg
Party	Republican	Democratic
Popular vote	731,679	399,634
Percentage	64.7%	35.3%
- County results McConnell: 50–60% 60–70% 70–80% 80–90% Weinberg: 50–60% 60–70%
U.S. senator before election
Mitch McConnell
Republican
Elected U.S. Senator
Mitch McConnell
Republican

Incumbent Republican Mitch McConnell easily won re-election to a fourth term.

Democratic primary results
Party	Candidate	Votes	%
Democratic	Lois Combs Weinberg	231,013	50.10%
Democratic	Tom Barlow	230,055	49.90%
Total votes		461,068	100.00%

General election
Party	Candidate	Votes	%	±%
Republican	Mitch McConnell (incumbent)	731,679	64.68%	+9.22%
Democratic	Lois Combs Weinberg	399,634	35.32%	−7.52%
Majority		332,045	29.35%	+16.74%
Turnout		1,131,313		
Republican hold		Swing		

== Louisiana ==
Louisiana election
- November 5 and December 7, 2002
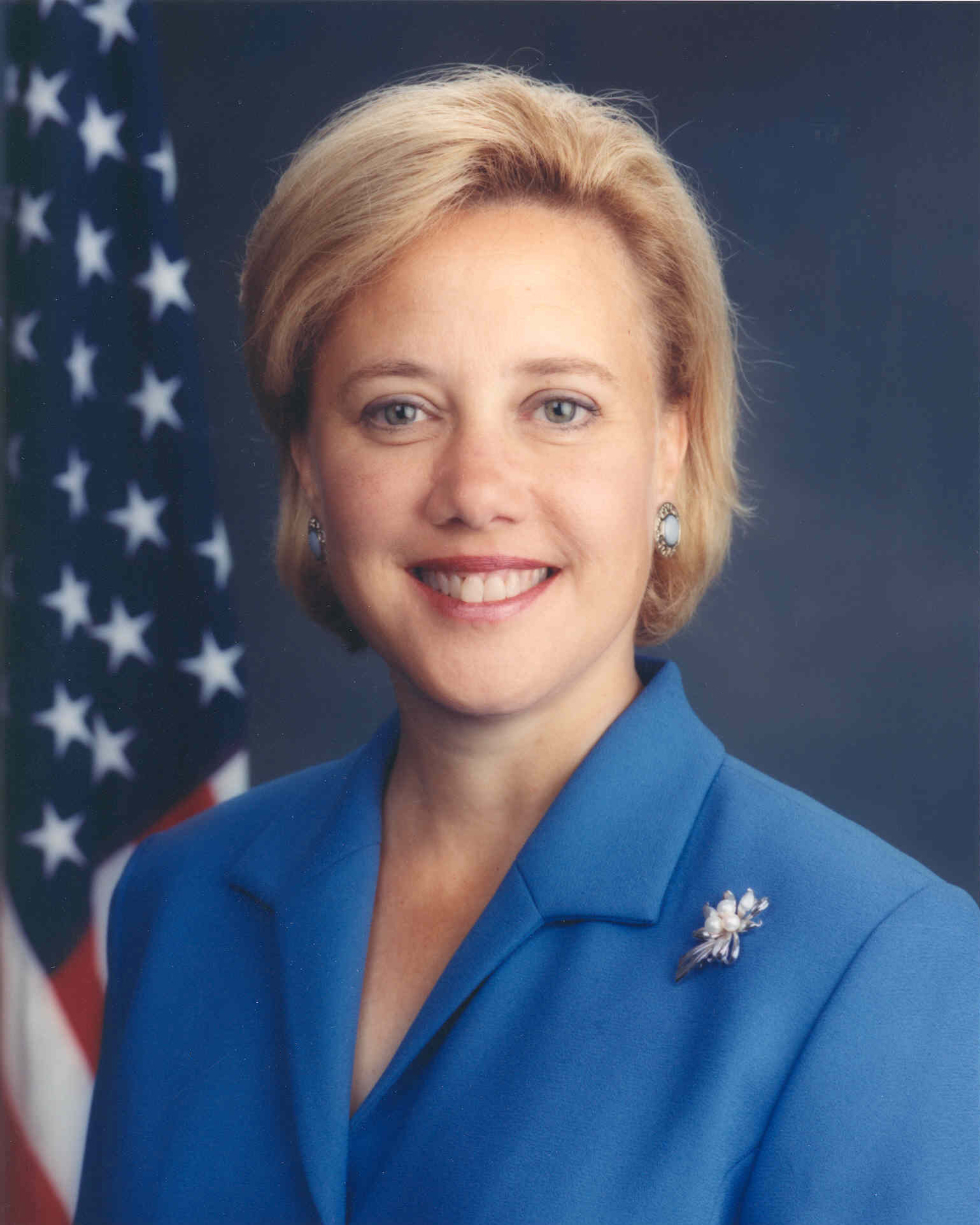

Nominee	Mary Landrieu	Suzanne Haik Terrell
Party	Democratic	Republican
Popular vote	638,654	596,642
Percentage	51.7%	48.3%
Landrieu
50–60%
60–70%
70–80%
Terrell
50–60%
60–70%
U.S. senator before election
Mary Landrieu
Democratic
Elected U.S. Senator
Mary Landrieu
Democratic

Incumbent Democrat Mary Landrieu narrowly won re-election to a second term.

During the runoff, Landrieu was out-spent three-to-one by Republican contender Suzanne Haik Terrell, the Louisiana elections commissioner. Terrell also had prominent Republicans including President George W. Bush and Vice President Dick Cheney visit Louisiana to campaign on her behalf. Republicans, confident of victory having gained seats in the elections to the House of Representatives and to the Senate, solidifying control of the former and taking control of the latter, publicly called the election "Operation Icing on the Cake". Some Democrats responded by calling their efforts "Operation Wipe that Smirk off of Bush's Face" and dubbed Landrieu's subsequent narrow runoff victory "Operation Pie in the Face".

Jungle primary election, November 5, 2002
Party	Candidate	Votes	%	±%
Democratic	Mary Landrieu (incumbent)	573,347	46.00%	
Republican	Suzanne Haik Terrell	339,506	27.24%	
Republican	John Cooksey	171,752	13.78%	
Republican	Tony Perkins	119,776	9.61%	
Democratic	Raymond Brown	23,553	1.89%	
Independent	Patrick E. "Live Wire" Landry	10,442	0.84%	
Independent	James Lemann	3,866	0.31%	
Libertarian	Gary D. Robbins	2,423	0.19%	
Republican	Ernest Edward Skillman, Jr.	1,668	0.13%	
Turnout		1,246,333	100.00%	

Landrieu pulled off what many considered to be an upset victory. The Republicans believed they would most likely win the race. Before the election, many Republicans called the race "Operation Icing on the Cake." After Landrieu won the runoff, Democrats dubbed her victory "Operation Pie in the Face." The race was close. In terms of rural parishes, the vote was split fairly evenly. Landrieu did well in Caddo Parish home of Shreveport, and in East Baton Rouge Parish home of East Baton Rouge. Ultimately, Landrieu's huge win in Orleans Parish home of New Orleans pushed her over the finish line. Haik Terrell conceded defeat to Landrieu at 12:38 p.m. EST, congratulating Landrieu on her victory. Landrieu would go on to be re-elected to a third term in 2008.

Runoff election, December 7, 2002
Party	Candidate	Votes	%	±%
Democratic	Mary Landrieu (incumbent)	638,654	51.70%	+1.53%
Republican	Suzanne Haik Terrell	596,642	48.30%	−1.53%
Majority		42,012	3.40%	+3.06%
Turnout		1,235,296	100.00%	
Democratic hold		Swing		

== Maine ==
Maine election
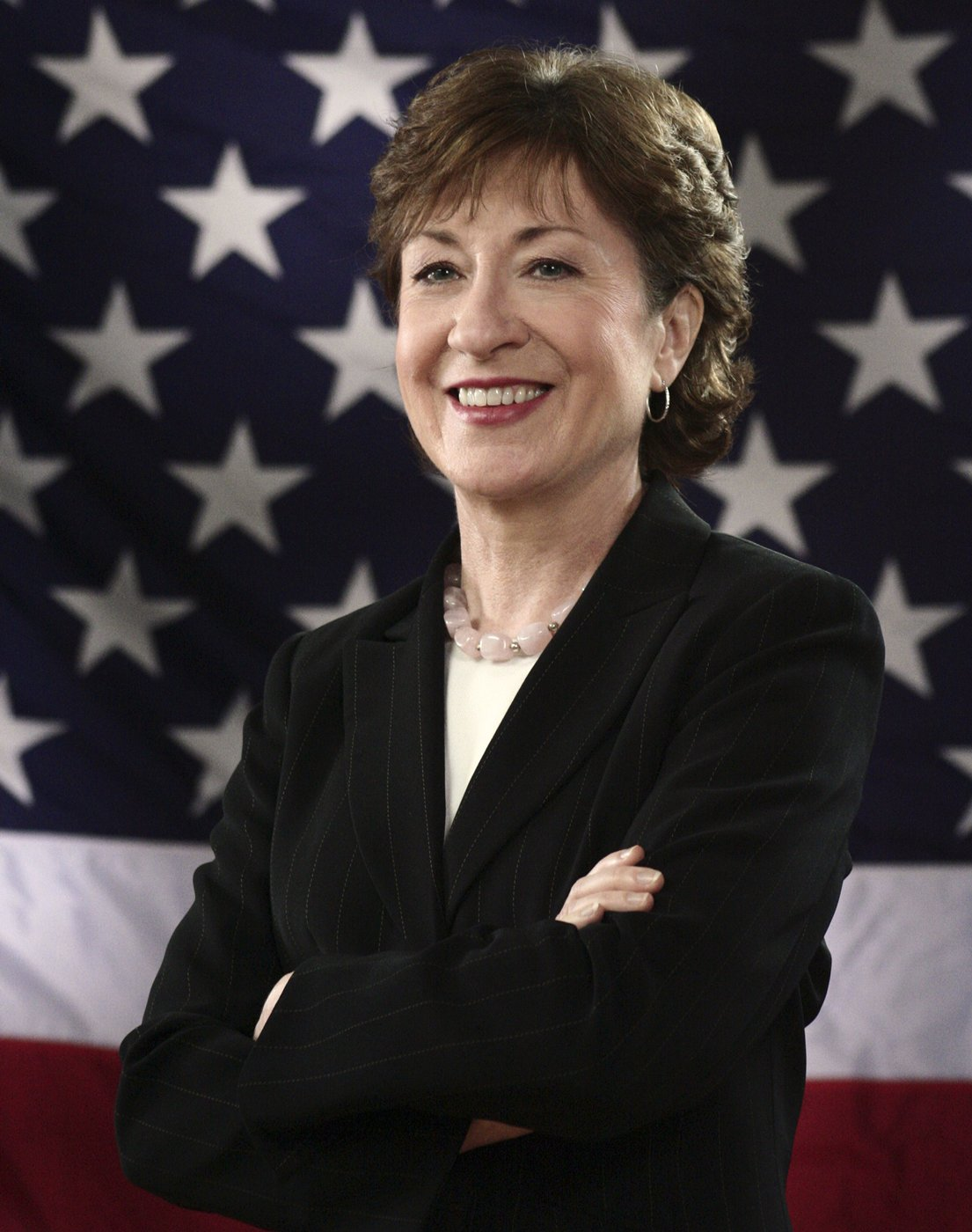

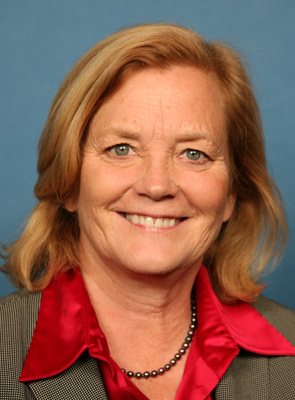
Nominee	Susan Collins	Chellie Pingree
Party	Republican	Democratic
Popular vote	295,041	209,858
Percentage	58.4%	41.6%
- Collins: 40–50% 50–60% 60–70% 70–80% 80–90% >90% Pingree: 40–50% 50–60% 60–70% 70–80% Tie: 50–60%
U.S. senator before election
Susan Collins
Republican
Elected U.S. Senator
Susan Collins
Republican

Incumbent Republican Susan Collins comfortably won re-election to a second term.

Chellie Pingree, state senator and Senate majority leader, attacked Collins for supporting the Bush tax cuts. Both candidates opposed the Iraq War in the fall of 2002. However, Collins then supported the congressional resolution to attack Iraq, while Pingree opposed it.

Collins, a popular moderate, was supported by some health care groups, environmentalists and gay rights advocates. She handily defeated State Senator Chellie Pingree of North Haven in one of the few U.S. Senate elections in which both major parties nominated women.

General election
Party	Candidate	Votes	%	±%
Republican	Susan Collins (incumbent)	295,041	58.44%	+9.25%
Democratic	Chellie Pingree	209,858	41.56%	−2.31%
Majority		85,183	16.87%	+11.57%
Turnout		504,899		
Republican hold		Swing		

== Massachusetts ==
Massachusetts election
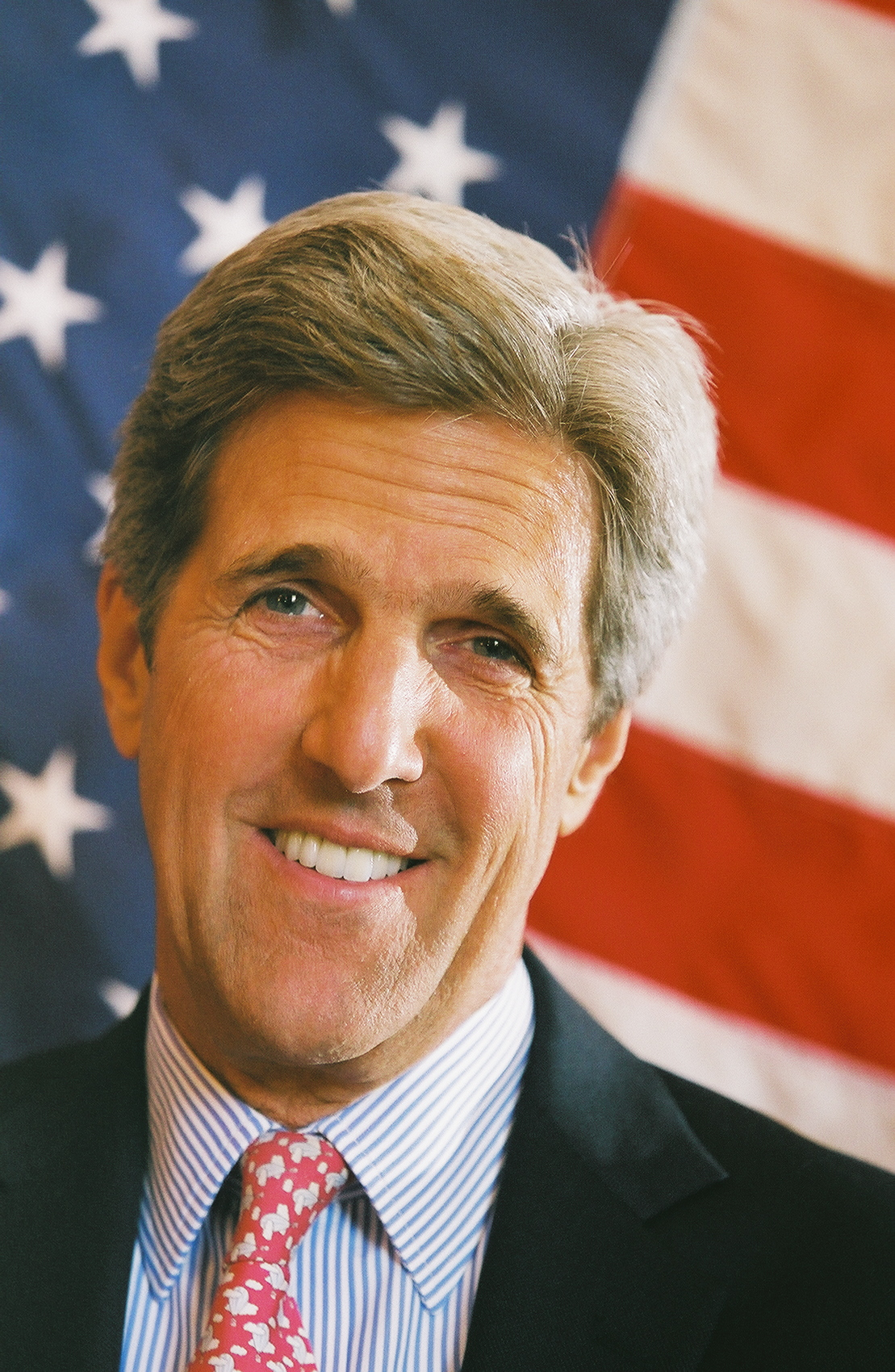

Nominee	John Kerry	Michael Cloud
Party	Democratic	Libertarian
Popular vote	1,605,976	369,807
Percentage	72.3%	16.7%
- Kerry: 50–60% 60–70% 70–80% 80–90%
U.S. senator before election
John Kerry
Democratic
Elected U.S. Senator
John Kerry
Democratic

Incumbent Democrat John Kerry won re-election to a fourth term against Libertarian Michael Cloud. The lack of a Republican party candidate caused Cloud to receive the largest percentage of votes for a U.S. Senate candidate in the Libertarian Party's history, though this record has since been eclipsed by Joe Miller in Alaska in 2016, and again by Ricky Dale Harrington in Arkansas in 2020.

General election results
Party	Candidate	Votes	%	±%
Democratic	John F. Kerry (incumbent)	1,605,976	72.33%	
Libertarian	Michael Cloud	369,807	16.66%	
Independent	Randall Forsberg (write-in)	24,898	1.12%	
	All others	6,077	0.27%	
	Blank / scattering	213,543	9.62%	
Total votes		2,220,301	100%	

== Michigan ==
Michigan election
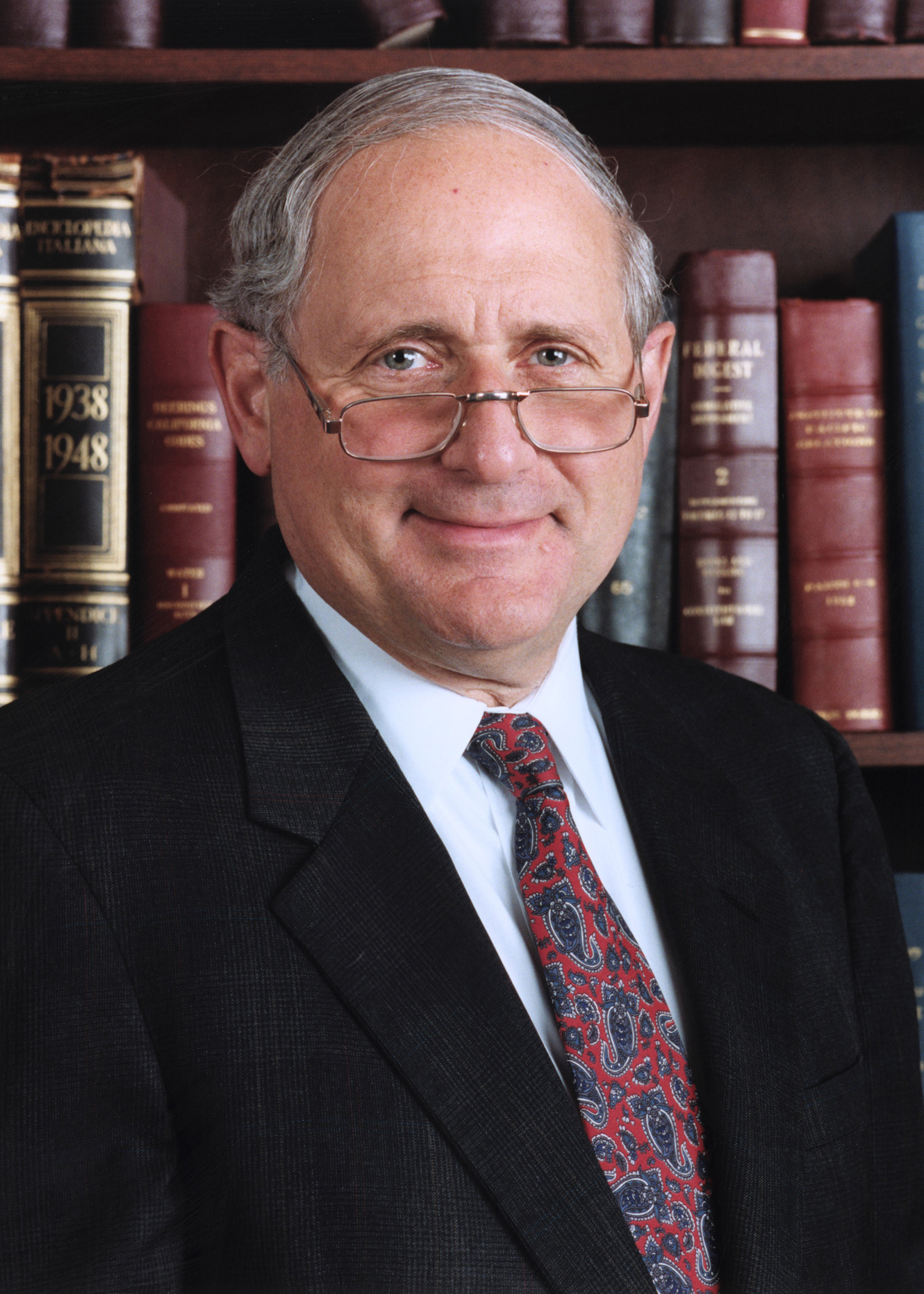

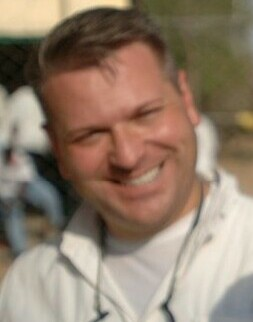
Nominee	Carl Levin	Andrew Raczkowski
Party	Democratic	Republican
Popular vote	1,896,614	1,185,545
Percentage	60.6%	37.9%
- Levin: 40-50% 50–60% 60–70% 70–80% Raczkowski: 40–50% 50–60% 60–70%
U.S. senator before election
Carl Levin
Democratic
Elected U.S. Senator
Carl Levin
Democratic

Incumbent Democrat Carl Levin comfortably won re-election to a fifth term over state Representative Andrew Raczkowski.

General election
Party	Candidate	Votes	%	±%
Democratic	Carl Levin (incumbent)	1,896,614	60.61%	+2.25%
Republican	Andrew Raczkowski	1,185,545	37.89%	−1.98%
Green	Eric Borregard	23,931	0.76%	+0.76%
Reform	John Mangopoulos	12,831	0.41%	+0.41%
Natural Law	Doug Dern	10,366	0.33%	+0.03%
Majority		711,069	22.72%	+4.23%
Turnout		3,129,287		
Democratic hold		Swing		

== Minnesota ==
Minnesota election

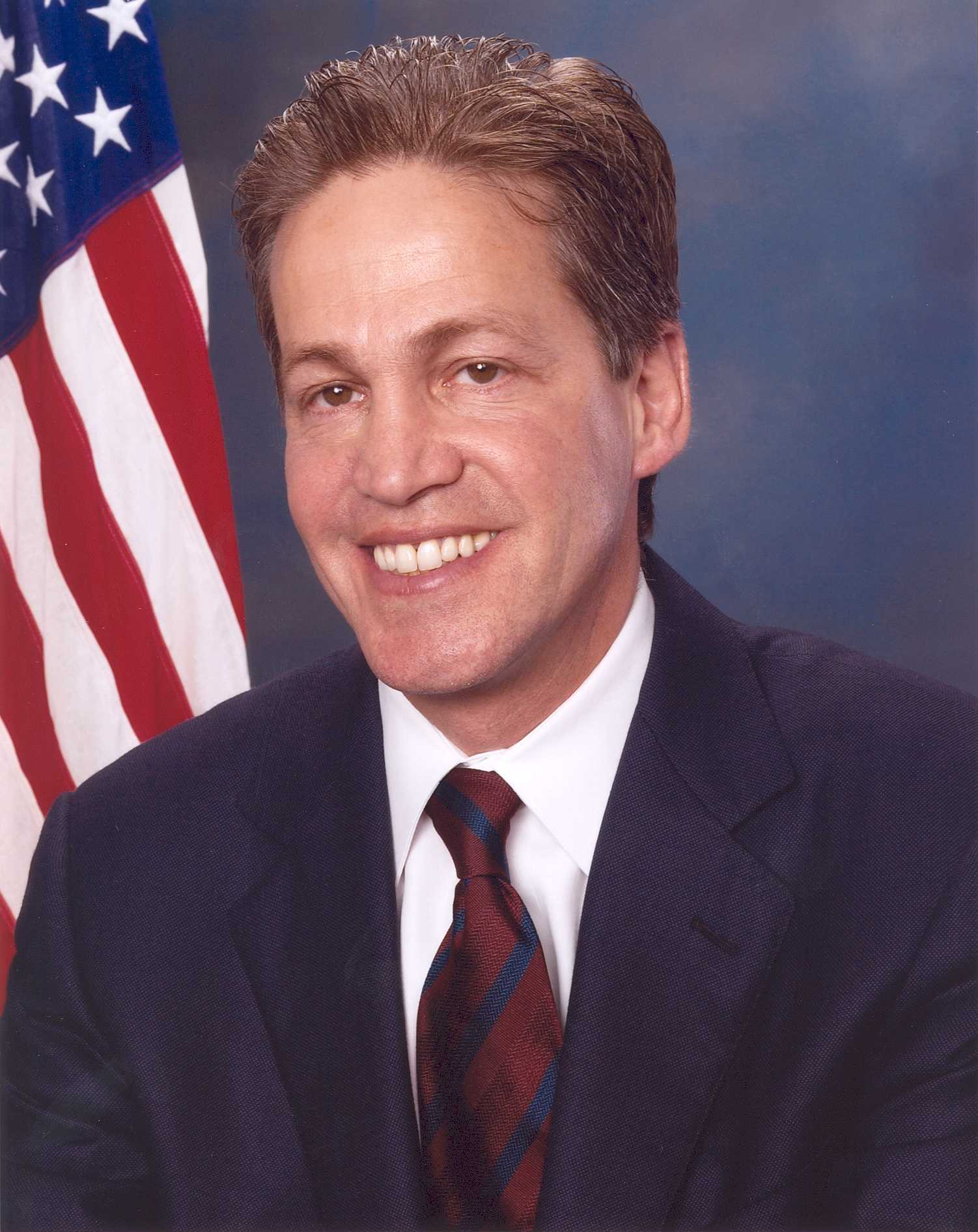

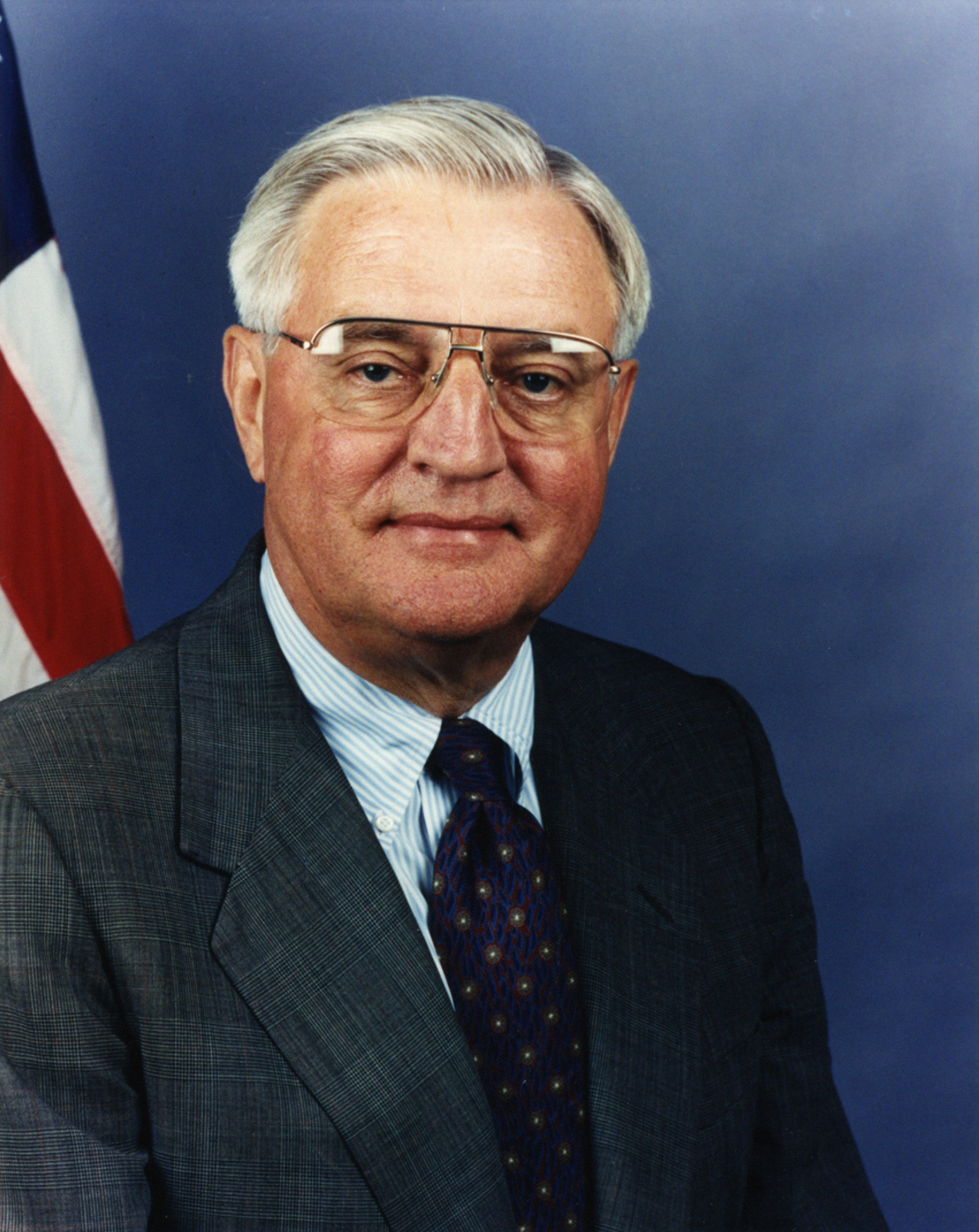
Nominee	Norm Coleman	Walter Mondale
Party	Republican	Democratic (DFL)
Popular vote	1,116,697	1,067,246
Percentage	49.5%	47.3%
- Coleman: 40–50% 50–60% 60–70% Mondale: 40–50% 50–60% 60–70%
U.S. senator before election
Dean Barkley
Independence
Elected U.S. Senator
Norm Coleman
Republican

Incumbent Democrat Paul Wellstone was running for re-election to a third term, but died in a plane crash eleven days before the election. The Democratic–Farmer–Labor Party (DFL) chose former vice president and 1984 presidential candidate Walter Mondale to replace Wellstone on the ballot. Mondale lost to Republican Saint Paul Mayor Norm Coleman. The day before the election, Independence Governor Jesse Ventura had appointed Dean Barkley (IP) to serve the rest of Wellstone's term. As of 2023, this was the last Senate election in Minnesota won by a Republican.

In the primaries, Paul Wellstone defeated Dick Franson 93% to 5%, and Norm Coleman defeated Jack Shepard 95% to 5%.

At the time of his death, Wellstone was slightly ahead in the polls. After Walter Mondale was chosen as the DFL candidate, in a poll taken a few days before the election, Mondale was leading 51% to 45%. Early on Election Day, Mondale was leading in votes. By nightfall, however, Coleman pulled ahead, winning by 49.5 percent to 47.3 percent.

Wellstone still appeared on the ballot despite his death, despite a court order replacing his name with Mondale's.

General election
Party	Candidate	Votes	%	±%
Republican	Norm Coleman	1,116,697	49.53%	+8.25%
Democratic (DFL)	Walter Mondale	1,067,246	47.34%	−2.98%
Independence	Jim Moore	45,139	2.00%	−4.98%
Democratic (DFL)	Paul Wellstone (incumbent, deceased)	11,381	0.50%	n/a
Green	Ray Tricomo	10,119	0.48%	n/a
Constitution	Miro Drago Kovatchevich	2,254	0.10%	n/a
Write-ins		1,803	0.80%	n/a
Majority		49,451	2.19%	Republican gain from Independence
Turnout		2,254,639	80.26%	
Republican gain from Independence		Swing		

== Mississippi ==
Mississippi election

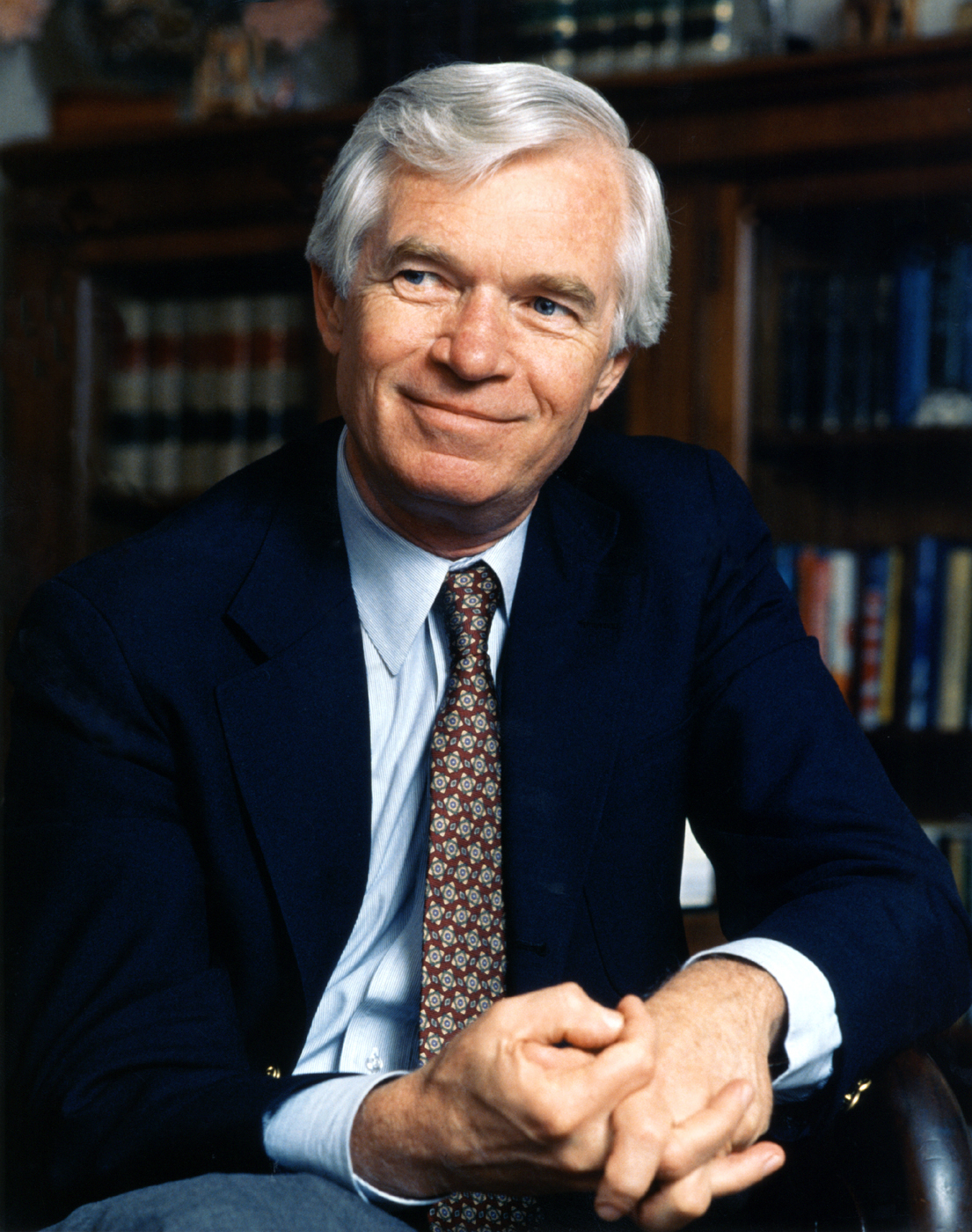

Nominee	Thad Cochran	Shawn O'Hara
Party	Republican	Reform
Popular vote	533,269	97,226
Percentage	84.6%	15.4%
- County results Cochran: 60–70% 70–80% 80–90% >90%
U.S. senator before election
Thad Cochran
Republican
Elected U.S. Senator
Thad Cochran
Republican

Incumbent Republican Thad Cochran overwhelmingly won re-election to a fifth term. The Democratic Party did not field a candidate, resulting in Reform Party candidate Shawn O'Hara winning 15.42% of the vote.

General election
Party	Candidate	Votes	%	±%
Republican	Thad Cochran (incumbent)	533,269	84.58%	
Reform	Shawn O'Hara	97,226	15.42%	
Majority		436,043	69.16%	
Turnout		630,495		
Republican hold		Swing		

== Missouri (special) ==
Missouri special election
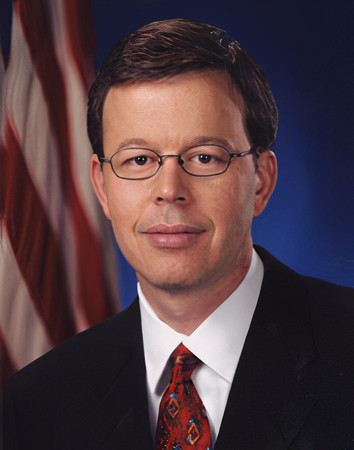

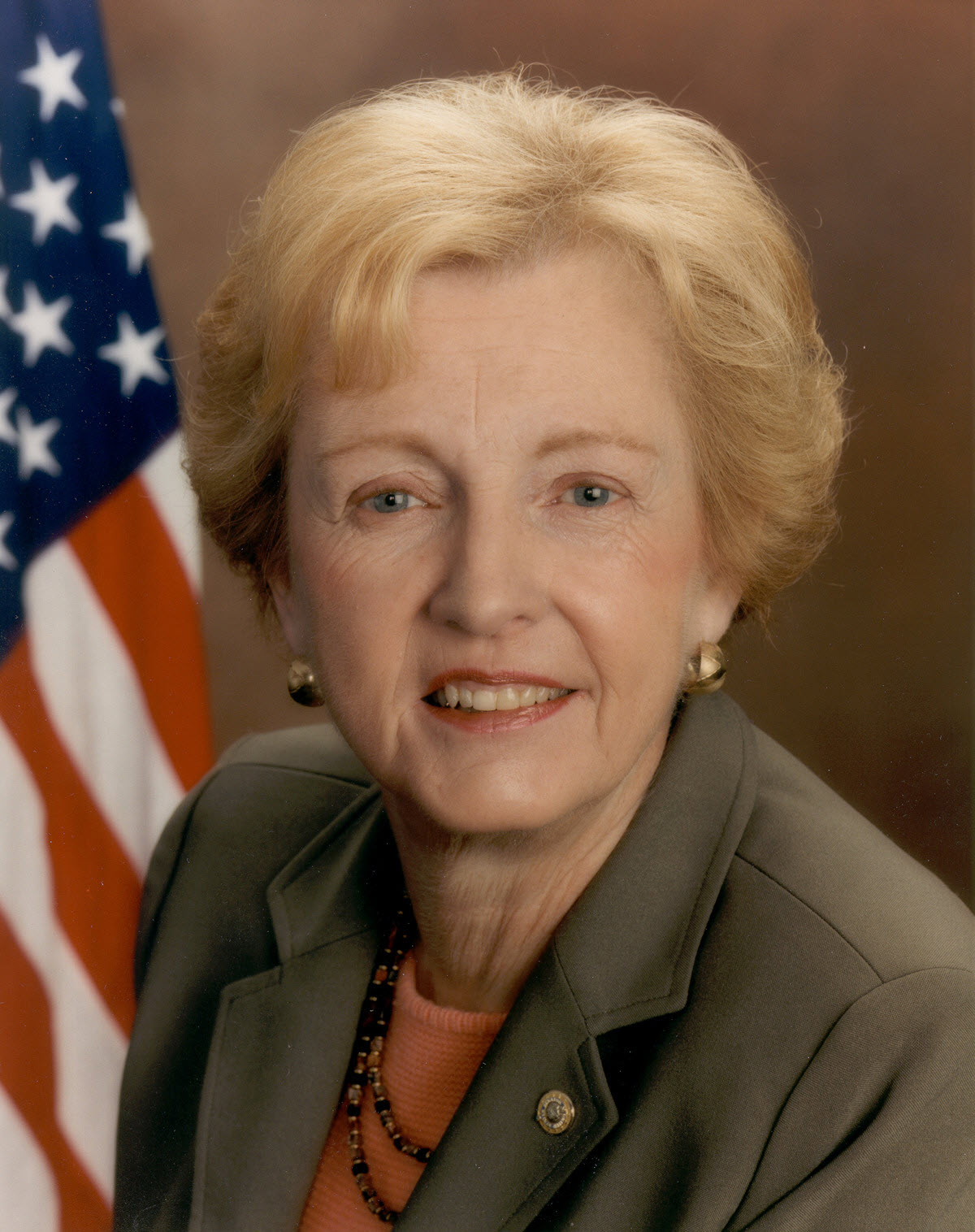
Nominee	Jim Talent	Jean Carnahan
Party	Republican	Democratic
Popular vote	935,032	913,778
Percentage	49.8%	48.7%
- County results Talent: 40-50% 50-60% 60-70% 70-80% Carnahan: 40–50% 50–60% 60–70% 70–80%
U.S. senator before election
Jean Carnahan
Democratic
Elected U.S. Senator
Jim Talent
Republican

In the 2000 election, Mel Carnahan, who had died in a plane crash three weeks before, remained on the ballot for election to the Senate. Carnahan beat his Republican opponent, John Ashcroft, who did not legally contest being defeated by a dead candidate. Carnahan's successor as governor, Roger B. Wilson, fulfilled his pre-election promise to appoint Carnahan's widow in her husband's place, and a special election was scheduled for 2002.

The election would decide who would serve the rest of Senator-elect Mel Carnahan's term after he died. The winner would serve four more years until the next election in 2006. Governor Roger Wilson had appointed Carnahan's widow Jean to serve temporarily. She then ran for the remainder of the term. Republican former U.S. Representative Jim Talent defeated her narrowly. While the race would have flipped control of the Senate from the Democrats to the Republicans, the Senate was adjourned, so no change in leadership occurred until the 108th Congress began in January 2003.

Democratic primary results
Party	Candidate	Votes	%
Democratic	Jean Carnahan (incumbent)	368,149	83.22
Democratic	Darrel D. Day	74,237	16.78
Total votes		442,386	100.00

Republican primary results
Party	Candidate	Votes	%
Republican	Jim Talent	395,994	89.58
Republican	Joseph A. May	18,525	4.19
Republican	Doris Bass Landfather	14,074	3.18
Republican	Scott Craig Babbitt	7,705	1.74
Republican	Martin Lindstedt	5,773	1.31
Total votes		442,071	100.00

Libertarian primary results
Party	Candidate	Votes	%
Libertarian	Tamara A. Millay	1,942	59.35
Libertarian	Edward Joseph Manley	1,330	40.65
Total votes		3,272	100.00

National security and Carnahan's vote against fellow Missourian John Ashcroft as attorney general were major issues in the campaign. Republicans argued that Carnahan owed her vote to Ashcroft, who had lost his bid for re-election to the Senate to Carnahan's husband. Talent, citing Carnahan's votes against homeland-security legislation and missile defense, accused her of being soft on national security, which she objected to, saying he was "doubt[ing] her patriotism."

Jack Abramoff contributed $2,000 to Talent's 2002 senatorial campaign, and Preston Gates & Ellis, a former Abramoff employer, also contributed $1,000 to Talent's campaign. Talent later returned both contributions. Talent's win returned Republican control of the Senate which had been under slight Democratic dominance resulting from Vermont junior Senator Jim Jeffords's decision to renounce the Republican Party, turning independent and making the choice to caucus with the Democrats.

Talent's victory was certified November 21, 2002, one day before Congress adjourned, which prevented Republicans from claiming a senate majority. He automatically became a senator the following day because, under federal law, he formally took office as soon as special election results were certified and the day after both chambers of Congress adjourned. Because Republicans would hold the majority in the following Congress, they saw no need to hold a special session in the 107th to take advantage of their brief majority.

General election
Party	Candidate	Votes	%	±%
Republican	Jim Talent	935,032	49.80%	+1.41%
Democratic	Jean Carnahan (incumbent)	913,778	48.67%	−1.80%
Libertarian	Tamara A. Millay	18,345	0.98%	+0.55%
Green	Daniel Romano	10,465	0.56%	+0.11%
Majority		21,254	1.13%	−0.94%
Turnout		1,877,620		
Republican gain from Democratic		Swing		

== Montana ==
Montana election
- November 4, 2002
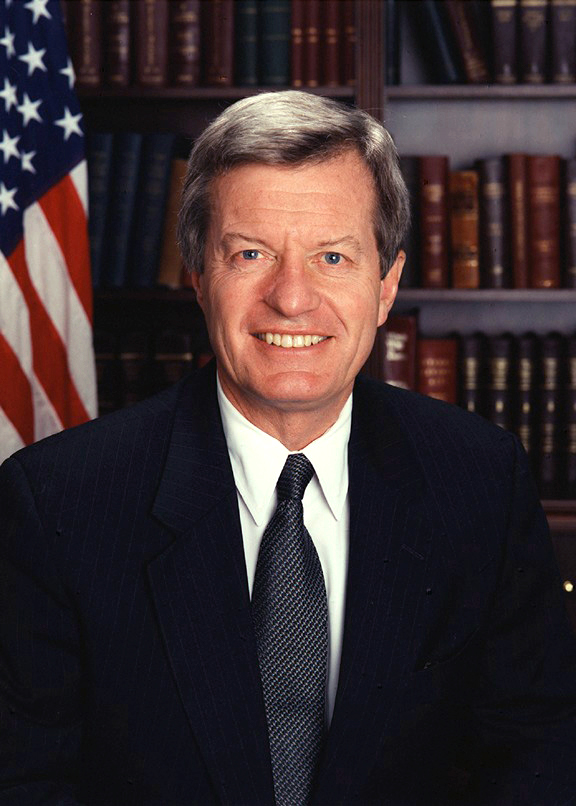
Nominee	Max Baucus	Mike Taylor
Party	Democratic	Republican
Popular vote	204,853	103,611
Percentage	62.7%	31.7%
- County results Baucus: 40–50% 50–60% 60–70% 70–80% 80–90% Taylor: 40–50% 50–60%
U.S. senator before election
Max Baucus
Democratic
Elected U.S. Senator
Max Baucus
Democratic

Incumbent Democrat Max Baucus easily won re-election to a fifth term.

Democratic Party primary results
Party	Candidate	Votes	%
Democratic	Max Baucus (incumbent)	66,713	100.00%
Total votes		66,713	100.00%

Republican Party primary results
Party	Candidate	Votes	%
Republican	Mike Taylor	48,169	60.16%
Republican	Brad Johnson	14,252	17.80%
Republican	John McDonald	10,116	12.63%
Republican	Melvin Hanson	7,536	9.41%
Total votes		80,073	100.00%

The election got national attention when Baucus's opponent, State Senator Mike Taylor, accused Baucus of implying that Taylor was gay in a campaign ad. The ad was paid for by the Democratic Senatorial Campaign Committee, though designed by the Baucus campaign. The ad, which alleged that Taylor had embezzled funds from the cosmetology school he once owned, showed footage from the early 1980s of Taylor massaging another man's face while wearing a tight suit with an open shirt. Due to financial shortages making it impossible for him to continue the race and having concerns about the effect the race was having on his family, Taylor dropped out of the race and Baucus won with 63 percent of the vote.

General election
Party	Candidate	Votes	%	±%
Democratic	Max Baucus (incumbent)	204,853	62.74%	+13.18%
Republican	Mike Taylor	103,611	31.73%	−12.96%
Libertarian	Stan Jones	10,420	3.19%	
Green	Bob Kelleher	7,653	2.34%	
Majority		101,242	31.00%	+26.14%
Turnout		326,537		
Democratic hold		Swing		

== Nebraska ==
Nebraska election
- November 7, 2002
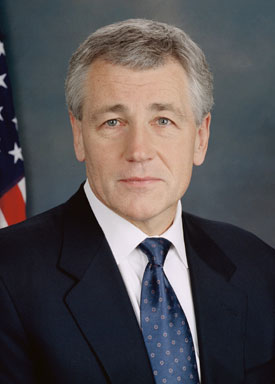
Nominee	Chuck Hagel	Charlie Matulka
Party	Republican	Democratic
Popular vote	397,438	70,290
Percentage	82.8%	14.6%
- County results Hagel: 60-70% 70-80% 80-90% >90%
U.S. senator before election
Chuck Hagel
Republican
Elected U.S. Senator
Chuck Hagel
Republican

Incumbent Republican Chuck Hagel overwhelmingly won re-election to a second term.

Democratic primary results
Party	Candidate	Votes	%
Democratic	Charlie A. Matulka	33,922	59.31%
Democratic	Al Hamburg	23,272	40.69%
Total votes		57,194	100.00%

Libertarian Party primary results
Party	Candidate	Votes	%
Libertarian	John J. Graziano	228	100.00%
Total votes		228	100.00%

Republican Party primary results
Party	Candidate	Votes	%
Republican	Chuck Hagel (incumbent)	144,160	100.00%
Total votes		144,160	100.00%

General election
Party	Candidate	Votes	%	±%
Republican	Chuck Hagel (incumbent)	397,438	82.76%	+25.36%
Democratic	Charlie A. Matulka	70,290	14.64%	−27.96%
Libertarian	John J. Graziano	7,423	1.55%	
Independent	Phil Chase	5,066	1.05%	
Majority		327,148	68.13%	+53.31%
Turnout		480,217		
Republican hold		Swing		

== New Hampshire ==
New Hampshire election
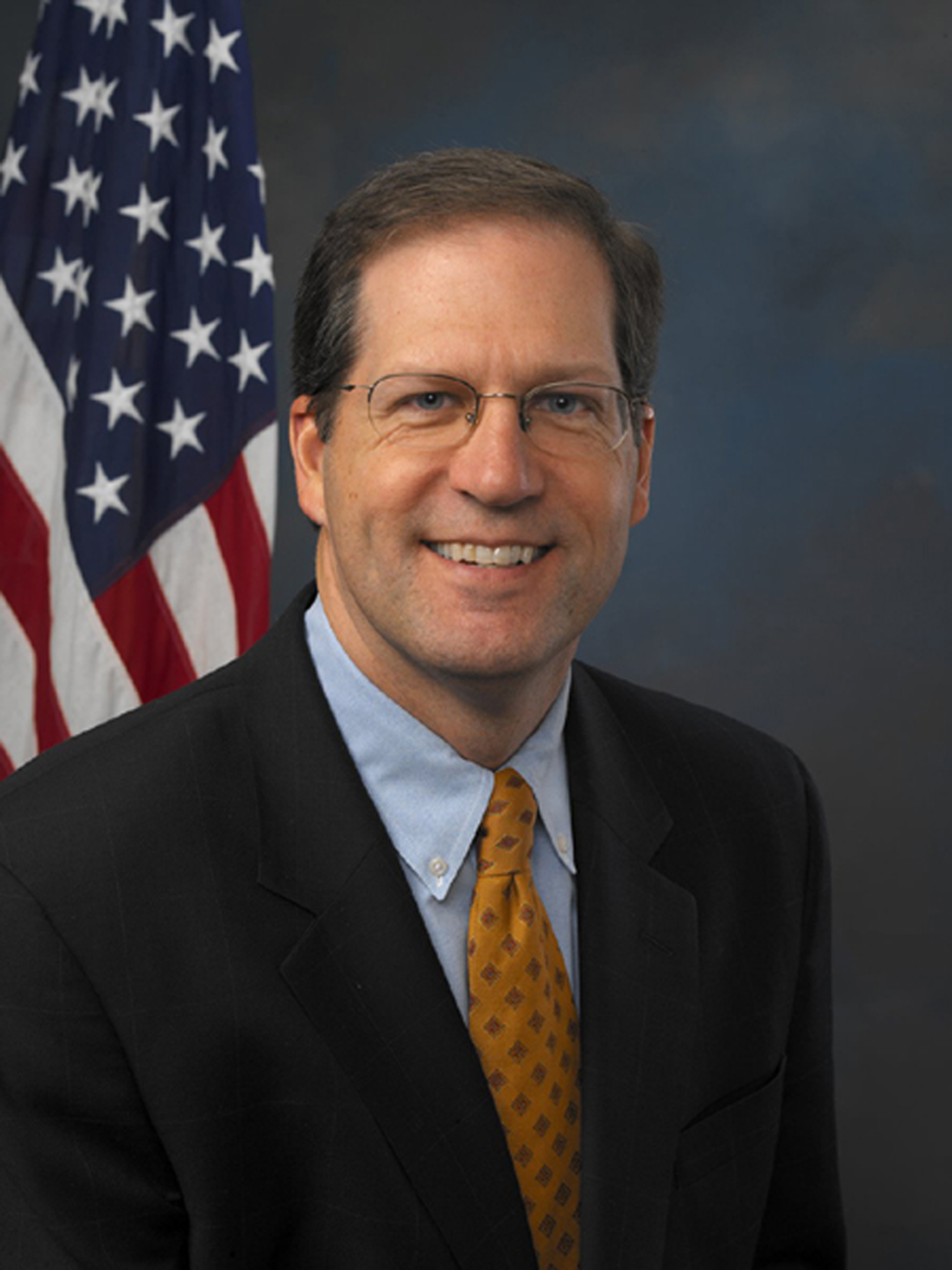

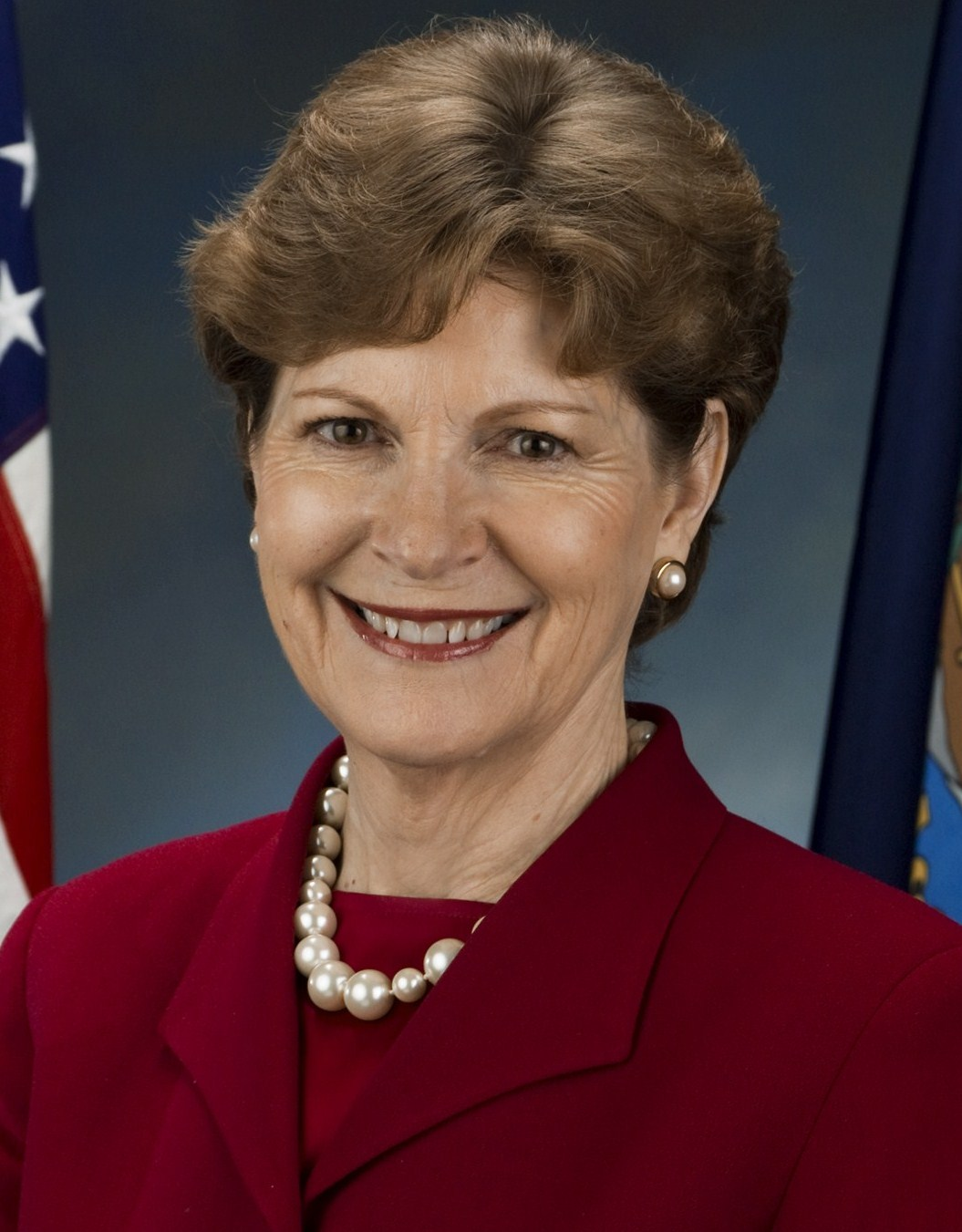
Nominee	John E. Sununu	Jeanne Shaheen
Party	Republican	Democratic
Popular vote	227,229	207,478
Percentage	50.8%	46.4%
- Sununu: 40–50% 50–60% 60–70% 70–80% >90% Shaheen: 40–50% 50–60% 60–70% 70–80% >90% Tie: 40–50%
U.S. senator before election
Bob Smith
Republican
Elected U.S. Senator
John E. Sununu
Republican

Incumbent Republican/Independent U.S. Senator Bob Smith was defeated in the Republican primary and denied renomination. Republican U.S. Representative John E. Sununu won the open seat. As of 2017, this is the last time a Republican has won the Class 2 Senate seat in New Hampshire.

Senator Bob Smith, the incumbent Republican senator, briefly left the party in 1999 to run for president as an independent, claiming that the Republican platform was "not worth the paper it's written on". He rejoined the GOP a few months later, saying he had made a mistake. Nonetheless, the party never fully forgave him, and some of his fellow Republican senators went so far as to endorse his primary opponent, Rep. John Sununu, who went on to win by 8 points.

Republican primary results
Party	Candidate	Votes	%
Republican	John Sununu	81,920	53.35%
Republican	Bob Smith (incumbent)	68,608	44.68%
Total votes		150,528	100.00%

During the campaign, there was a major scandal that involved the use of a telemarketing firm hired by that state's Republican Party (NHGOP) for election tampering. The GOP Marketplace, based in Northern Virginia, jammed another phone bank being used by the state Democratic Party and the firefighters' union for efforts to turn out voters on behalf of New Hampshire Governor Jeanne Shaheen on Election Day. The tampering involved using a call center to jam the phone lines of a Get Out the Vote (GOTV) operation. In the end, 900 calls were made for 45 minutes of disruption to the Democratic-leaning call centers. In addition to criminal prosecutions, disclosures in the case came from a civil suit filed by the state's Democratic Party against the state's Republican Party (now settled). Four of those involved were convicted of, or pleaded guilty to, federal crimes and sentenced to prison for their involvement as of 2018. One conviction was reversed by an appeals court, a decision prosecutors appealed. James Tobin, the defendant freed on appeal, was later indicted on charges of lying to the FBI during the original investigation.

General election
Party	Candidate	Votes	%	±%
Republican	John Sununu	227,229	50.8%	
Democratic	Jeanne Shaheen	207,478	46.4%	
Libertarian	Ken Blevens	9,835	2.2%	
Republican hold		Swing		

== New Jersey ==
New Jersey election
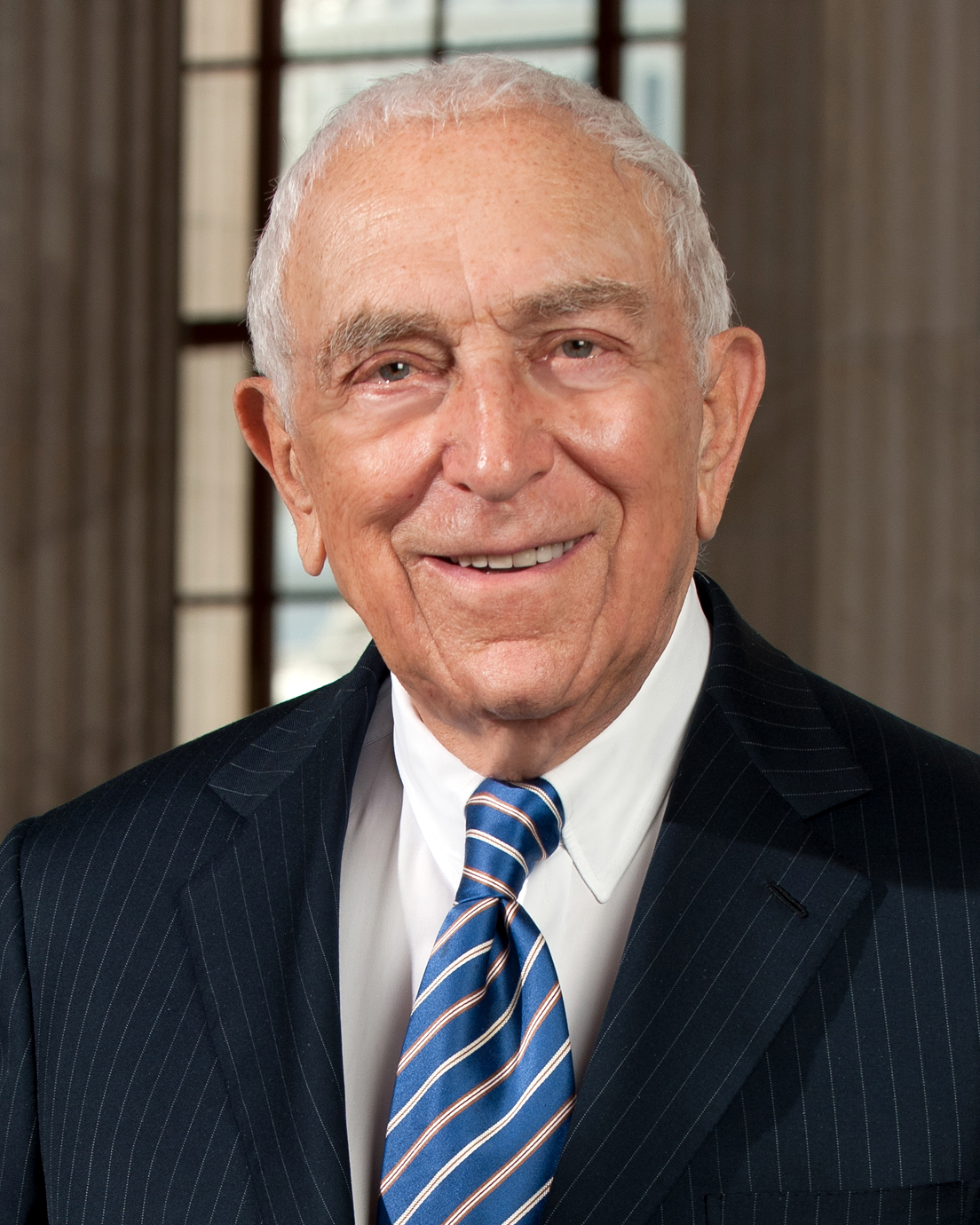
Nominee	Frank Lautenberg	Doug Forrester
Party	Democratic	Republican
Popular vote	1,138,193	928,439
Percentage	53.88%	43.95%
- Lautenberg: 40–50% 50–60% 60–70% 70–80% Forrester: 50–60% 60–70%
U.S. senator before election
Robert Torricelli
Democratic
Elected U.S. Senator
Frank Lautenberg
Democratic

The race was to originally feature Democrat Robert Torricelli, who was running for a second term in the seat he had won when former Senator Bill Bradley elected not to run for a fourth term in 1996, and who had been the state's senior senator following Frank Lautenberg's retirement at the end of the 106th United States Congress, against former West Windsor Township mayor Douglas Forrester, who had won the Republican nomination.

Torricelli, however, had been the target of an ethics probe, and eventually dropped out of the race on September 30 due to ethical concerns and poor poll numbers against Forrester, a relatively unknown opponent. The New Jersey Democratic Party convinced the retired Lautenberg to join the race after Torricelli dropped out. In the case of The New Jersey Democratic Party v. Samson, 175 N.J. 178 (2002), Forrester sued to stop Democratic Party efforts to have Lautenberg replace Torricelli. The New Jersey Supreme Court ruled unanimously on October 2 that the party could exchange Lautenberg's name for Torricelli's on the ballot. Forrester received the endorsement of President George W. Bush.

In the general election, Lautenberg defeated Forrester and became the state's junior senator for the second time when he was sworn in on January 3, 2003 (Bradley, elected in 1978, was the senior senator during Lautenberg's first fourteen years in office, and Jon Corzine, who was elected to Lautenberg's old Senate seat, became the senior senator in 2003, as Lautenberg's previous eighteen years in the Senate were not counted towards seniority).

General election
Party	Candidate	Votes	%	±%
Democratic	Frank Lautenberg	1,138,193	53.88%	
Republican	Doug Forrester	928,439	43.95%	
Green	Ted Glick	24,308	1.15%	
Libertarian	Elizabeth Macron	12,558	0.59%	
Conservative	Norman E. Wahner	6,404	0.30%	
Socialist	Greg Pason	2,702	0.13%	
Majority		209,754	9.93%	
Turnout				
Democratic hold		Swing		

== New Mexico ==
New Mexico election
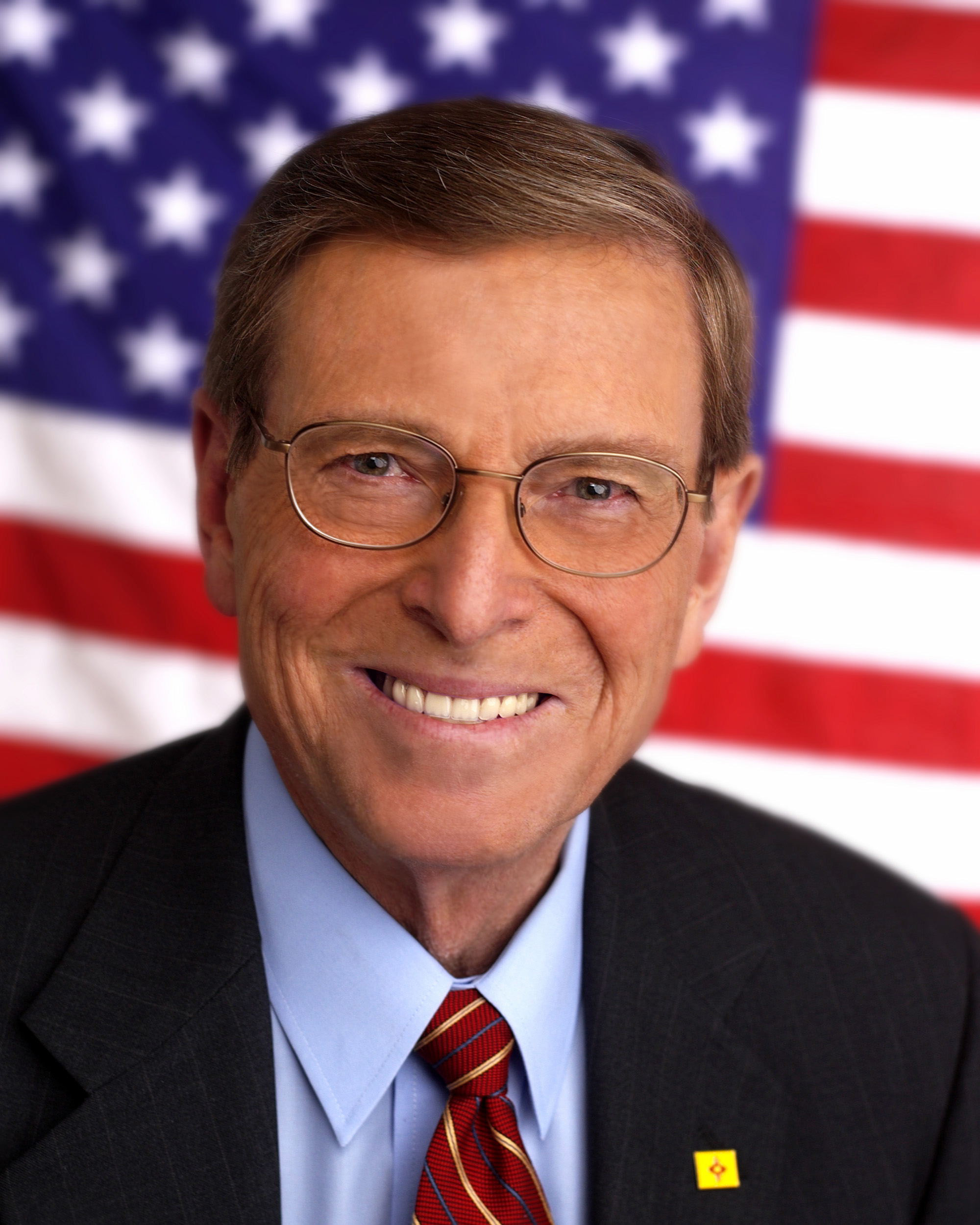

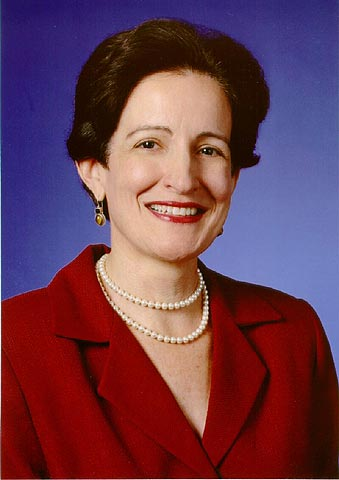
Nominee	Pete Domenici	Gloria Tristani
Party	Republican	Democratic
Popular vote	314,193	168,886
Percentage	65.0%	35.0%
- County results Domenici: 50–60% 60–70% 70–80% 80–90% Tristani: 50–60%
U.S. senator before election
Pete Domenici
Republican
Elected U.S. Senator
Pete Domenici
Republican

Incumbent Republican Pete Domenici easily won re-election to a sixth term. As of 2022, this is the last Senate election in New Mexico won by a Republican.

Democratic primary results
Party	Candidate	Votes	%
Democratic	Gloria Tristani	109,084	77.71%
Democratic	Francesa Lobato	31,228	22.24%
Democratic	Don E. Durham (write-in)	73	0.05%
Total votes		140,385	100.00%

Republican primary results
Party	Candidate	Votes	%
Republican	Pete Domenici (incumbent)	91,898	99.93%
Republican	Orlin G. Cole (write-in)	62	0.07%
Total votes		91,960	100.00%

General election
Party	Candidate	Votes	%	±%
Republican	Pete Domenici (incumbent)	314,193	65.04%	+0.32%
Democratic	Gloria Tristani	168,863	34.96%	+5.17%
Majority		145,324	30.09%	−4.86%
Turnout		483,056		
Republican hold		Swing		

== North Carolina ==
North Carolina election
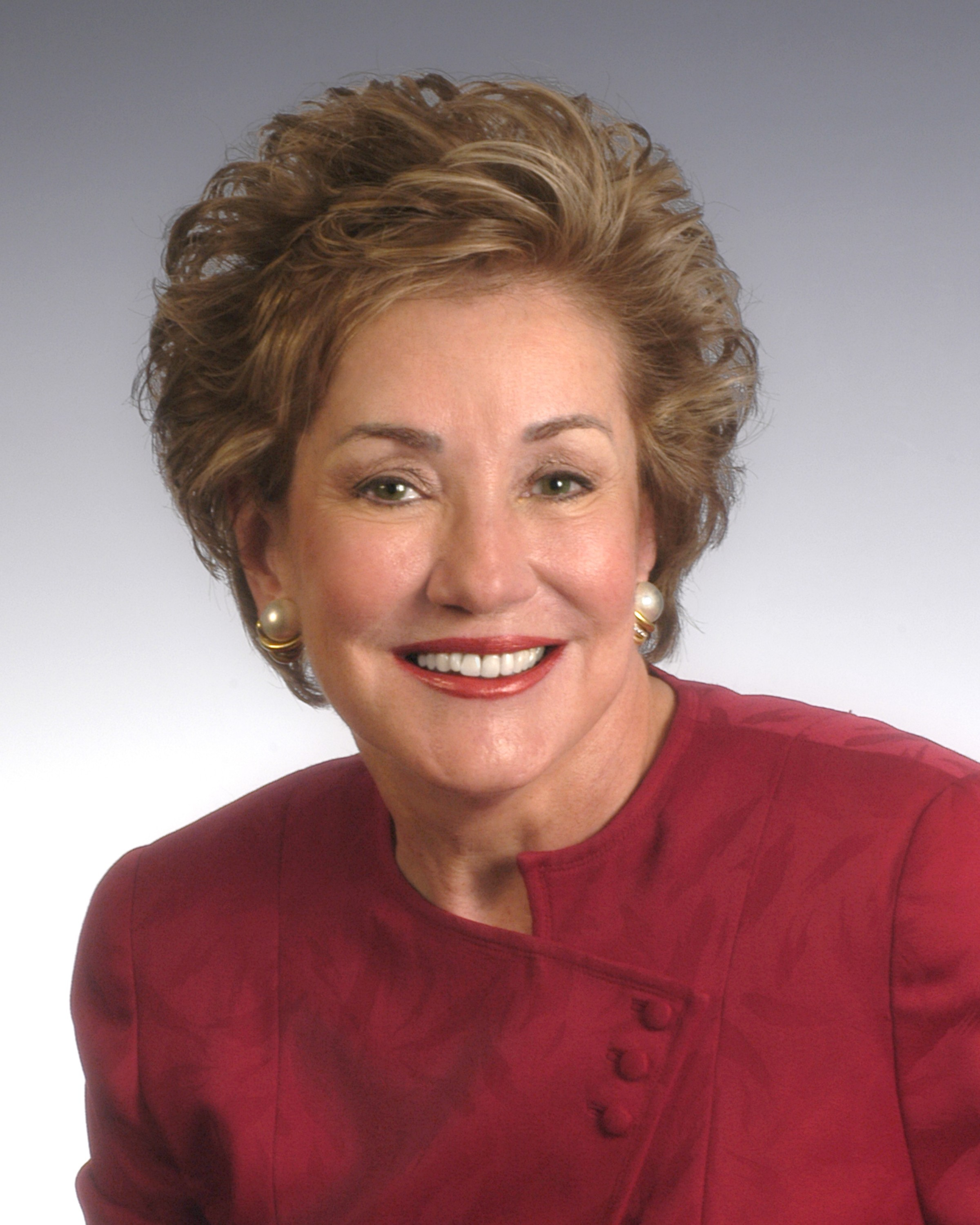

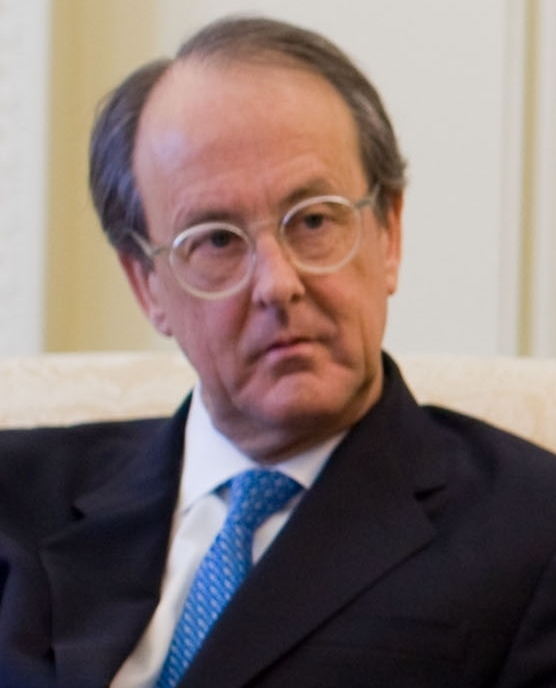
Nominee	Elizabeth Dole	Erskine Bowles
Party	Republican	Democratic
Popular vote	1,248,664	1,047,983
Percentage	53.56%	44.96%
- County results Dole: 40–50% 50–60% 60–70% 70–80% Bowles: 40–50% 50–60% 60–70% 70–80%
Senator before election
Jesse Helms
Republican
Elected Senator
Elizabeth Dole
Republican

Incumbent Republican Jesse Helms decided to retire due to health issues. Republican Elizabeth Dole, former president of the American Red Cross, won the open seat over Democrat Erskine Bowles, former White House chief of staff.

Democratic primary
Party	Candidate	Votes	%	±%
Democratic	Erskine Bowles	277,329	43.4%	
Democratic	Dan Blue	184,216	28.8%	
Democratic	Elaine Marshall	97,392	15.2%	
Democratic	Cynthia D. Brown	27,799	4.4%	
Democratic	Others	52,289	8.2%	

Republican primary
Party	Candidate	Votes	%	±%
Republican	Elizabeth Dole	342,631	80.4%	
Republican	James Snyder Jr.	60,477	14.2%	
Republican	Jim Parker	8,752	2.1%	
Republican	Ada Fisher	6,045	1.4%	
Republican	Others	8,201	1.9%	

General election
Party	Candidate	Votes	%	±%
Republican	Elizabeth Dole	1,248,664	53.56%	+0.92%
Democratic	Erskine Bowles	1,047,983	44.96%	−0.96%
Libertarian	Sean Haugh	33,807	1.45%	+0.46%
Write-in	Paul DeLaney	727	0.03%	+0.02%
Majority		200,681	8.60%	+1.88%
Turnout		2,331,181		
Republican hold		Swing		

== Oklahoma ==
Oklahoma election
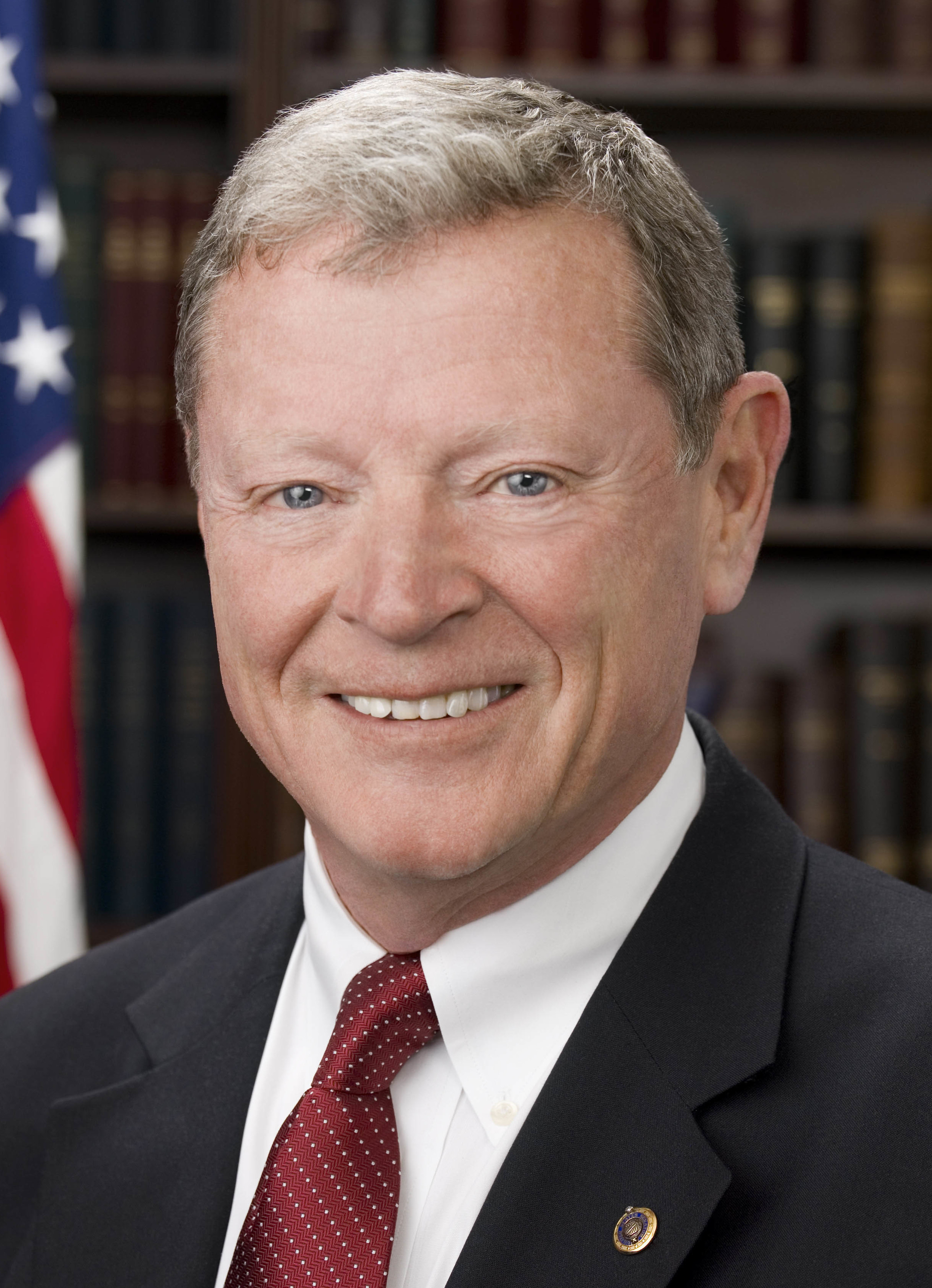

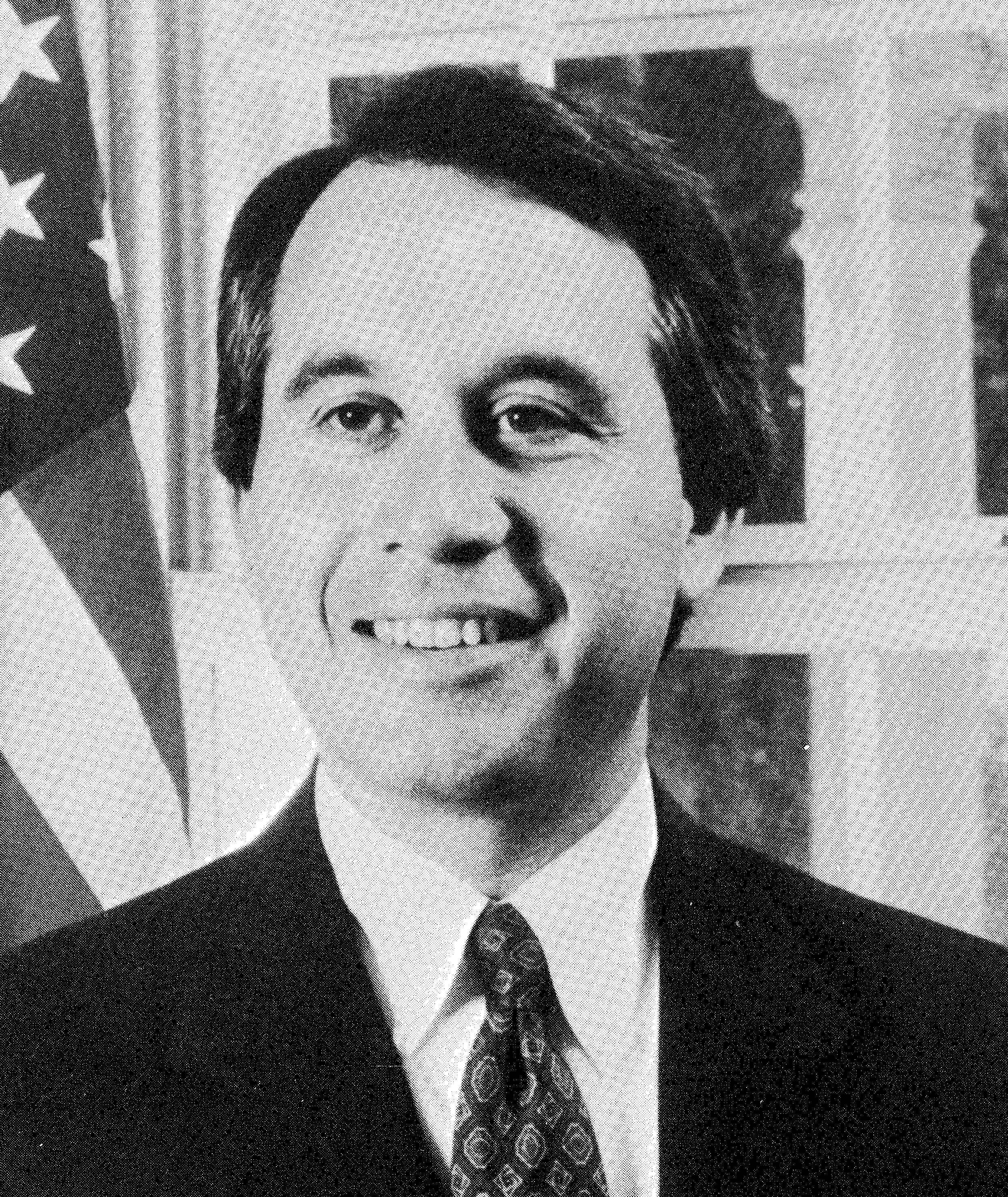
Nominee	Jim Inhofe	David Walters
Party	Republican	Democratic
Popular vote	583,579	369,789
Percentage	57.30%	36.31%
Nominee	James Germalic
Party	Independent
Popular vote	65,056
Percentage	6.39%
- County results Inhofe: 40–50% 50–60% 60–70% 70–80% Walters: 40–50% 50–60%
U.S. senator before election
James Inhofe
Republican
Elected U.S. Senator
James Inhofe
Republican

Incumbent Republican Jim Inhofe won re-election to a second term over Democratic former governor David Walters.

General election
Party	Candidate	Votes	%	±%
Republican	James Inhofe (incumbent)	583,579	57.30%	
Democratic	David Walters	369,789	36.31%	
Independent	James Germalic	65,056	6.39%	
Majority		213,790	20.99%	
Turnout		1,018,424		
Republican hold		Swing		

== Oregon ==
Oregon election
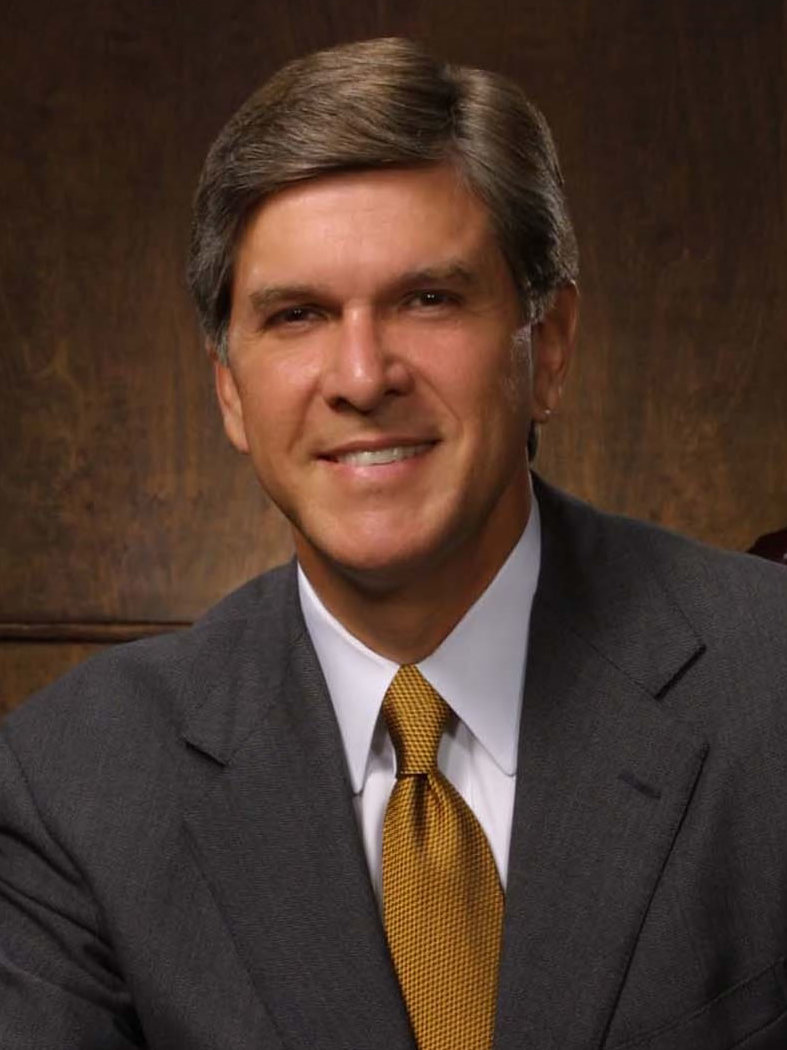

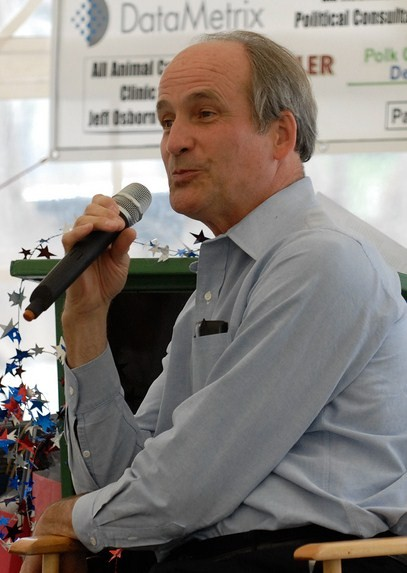
Nominee	Gordon Smith	Bill Bradbury
Party	Republican	Democratic
Popular vote	712,287	501,898
Percentage	56.2%	39.6%
- County results Smith: 40-50% 50-60% 60-70% 70-80% 80-90% Bradbury: 50–60%
Senator before election
Gordon Smith
Republican
Elected Senator
Gordon Smith
Republican

Incumbent Republican Gordon Smith ran for re-election to a second term. Smith, who had only served one term in the U.S. Senate, had a popularity rating slightly lower than 50% before the summer of 2002 began. Secretary of State Bill Bradbury emerged as the Democratic nominee, and though a competitive gubernatorial election occurred at the same time, Bradbury's campaign was never able to gain traction and Smith comfortably won re-election. As of 2022, this is the last Senate election in Oregon won by a Republican.

Democratic primary results
Party	Candidate	Votes	%
Democratic	Bill Bradbury	279,792	85.89%
Democratic	Craig Hanson	27,472	8.43%
Democratic	Greg Haven	13,995	4.30%
Democratic	Write-ins	4,480	1.38%
Total votes		325,739	100.00%

Republican primary results
Party	Candidate	Votes	%
Republican	Gordon Smith (incumbent)	306,504	98.89%
Republican	Write-ins	3,439	1.11%
Total votes		309,943	100.00%

General election
Party	Candidate	Votes	%	±%
Republican	Gordon Smith (incumbent)	712,287	56.21%	+6.41%
Democratic	Bill Bradbury	501,898	39.61%	−6.30%
Libertarian	Dan Fitzgerald	29,979	2.37%	+1.43%
Constitution	Lon Mabon	21,703	1.71%	
Write-ins		1,354	0.11%	
Majority		210,389	16.60%	+12.71%
Turnout		1,267,221		
Republican hold		Swing		

== Rhode Island ==
Rhode Island election
- November 4, 2002
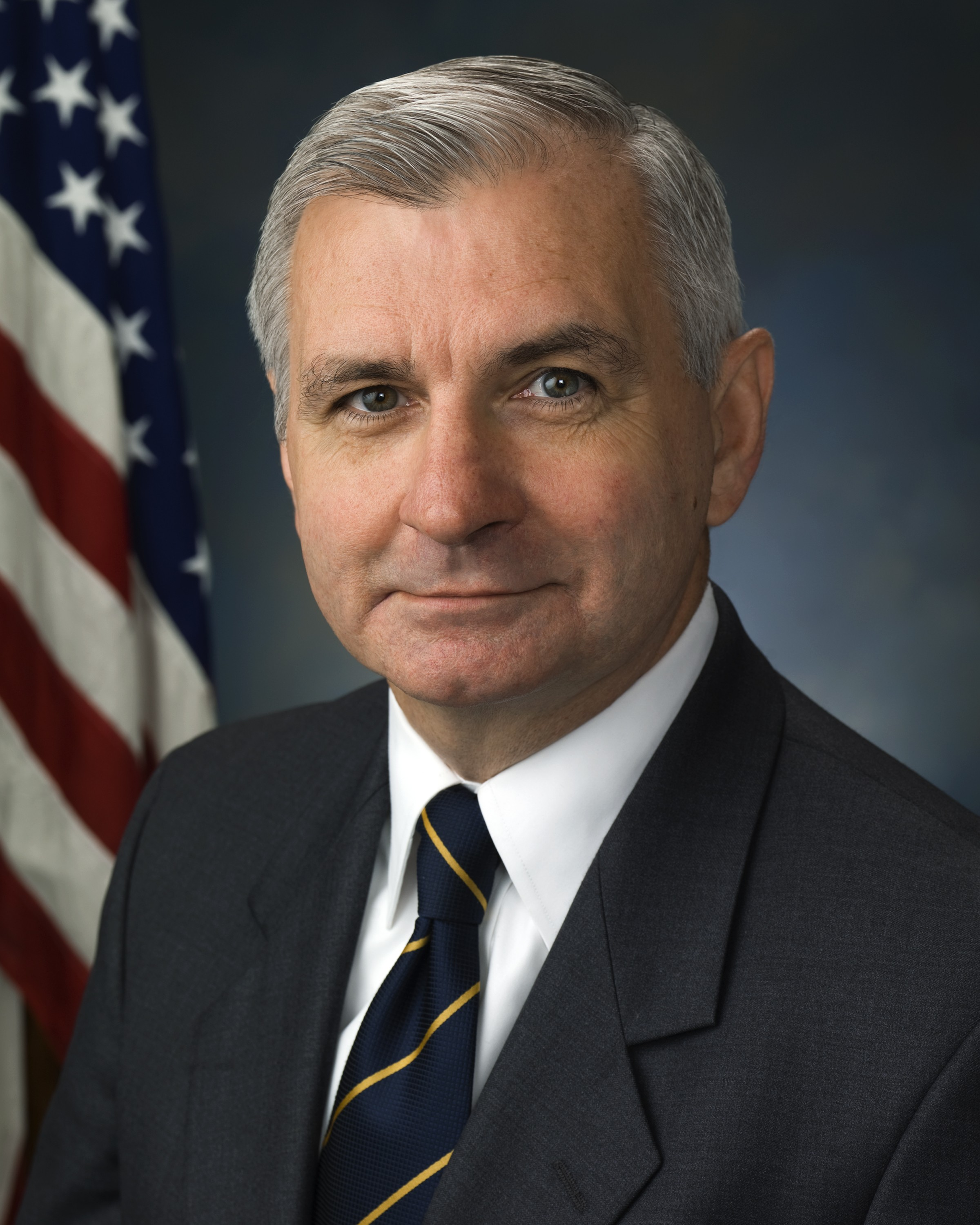
Nominee	Jack Reed	Robert Tingle
Party	Democratic	Republican
Popular vote	253,922	69,881
Percentage	78.4%	21.6%
- Reed: 60–70% 70–80% 80–90%
U.S. senator before election
Jack Reed
Democratic
Elected U.S. Senator
Jack Reed
Democratic

Incumbent Democrat Jack Reed won re-election to a second term. He was an extremely popular senator, with a May Brown University poll showing the incumbent with a 73% approval rating, higher than any other elected lawmaker in the state. Reed's best performance was in Providence County, where he won with over 80% of the vote over Republican Robert Tingle, casino pit boss and nominee for RI-02 in 2000.

Democratic primary results
Party	Candidate	Votes	%
Democratic	Jack Reed (incumbent)	85,315	100.00%
Total votes		85,315	100.00%

Republican Party primary results
Party	Candidate	Votes	%
Republican	Robert Tingle	16,041	100.00%
Total votes		16,041	100.00%

General election
Party	Candidate	Votes	%	±%
Democratic	Jack Reed (incumbent)	253,922	78.43%	+15.12%
Republican	Robert Tingle	69,881	21.57%	−13.38%
Majority		183,966	56.85%	+28.50%
Turnout		323,582		
Democratic hold		Swing		

== South Carolina ==
South Carolina election
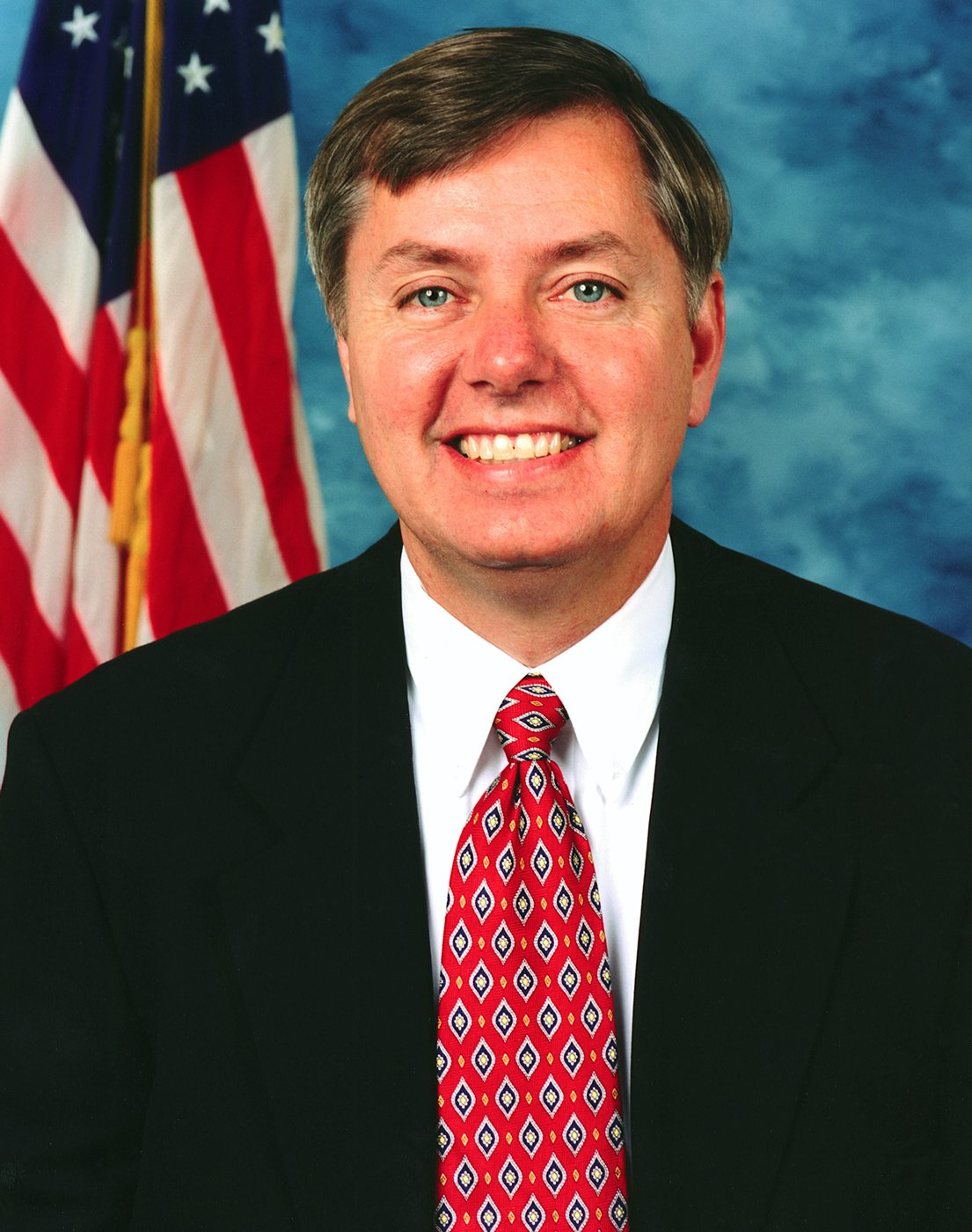

Nominee	Lindsey Graham	Alex Sanders
Party	Republican	Democratic
Popular vote	600,010	487,359
Percentage	54.4%	44.2%
- County results Graham: 50–60% 60–70% 70–80% Sanders: 40–50% 50–60% 60–70% 70–80%
U.S. senator before election
Strom Thurmond
Republican
Elected U.S. Senator
Lindsey Graham
Republican

Long-time incumbent Strom Thurmond decided to retire at the age of 100, becoming the first centenarian to ever serve in Congress, and at that time was the longest serving senator in U.S. history (a record later surpassed by West Virginia's Robert Byrd). Republican Lindsey Graham won the open seat.

Alex Sanders, the former president of the College of Charleston, entered the race and faced no opposition from South Carolina Democrats, thereby avoiding a primary election.

Representative Lindsey Graham had no challenge for the Republican nomination and thus avoided a primary election. This was due in large part because the South Carolina Republicans were preoccupied with the gubernatorial race, and also because potential rivals were deterred by the huge financial war chest Graham had amassed early in the campaign.

The election campaign between Graham and Sanders was bitterly fought. Graham's campaign emphasized his consistent conservative voting record that he claimed closely matched that of outgoing Senator Strom Thurmond. Sanders campaigned on his membership in the NAACP, the Sons of Confederate Veterans, and the NRA. He said that he was against the death penalty for religious reasons, supported abortion rights, and supported greater government involvement in education. Graham attacked Sanders for these positions consistently throughout the campaign, and Sanders hit back at Graham for wanting to privatize Social Security. Graham won the election by slightly over 10 percent.

General election
Party	Candidate	Votes	%	±%
Republican	Lindsey Graham	600,010	54.4%	+1.0%
Democratic	Alex Sanders	487,359	44.2%	+0.2%
Constitution	Ted Adams	8,228	0.7%	+0.7%
Libertarian	Victor Kocher	6,684	0.6%	−0.5%
No party	Write-ins	667	0.1%	+0.1%
Majority		112,651	10.2%	+0.8%
Turnout		1,102,948	53.9%	−10.1%
Republican hold		Swing		

== South Dakota ==
South Dakota election
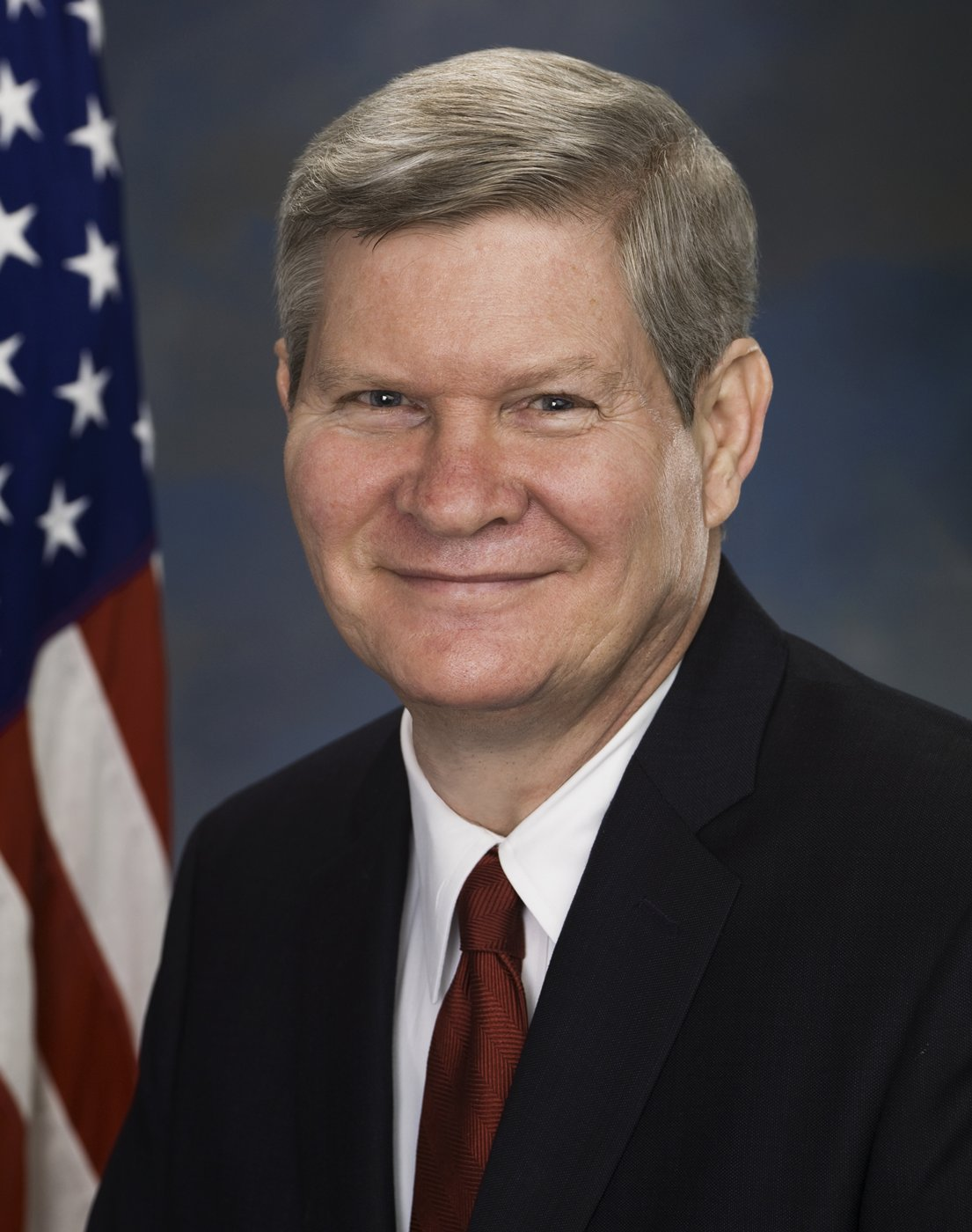

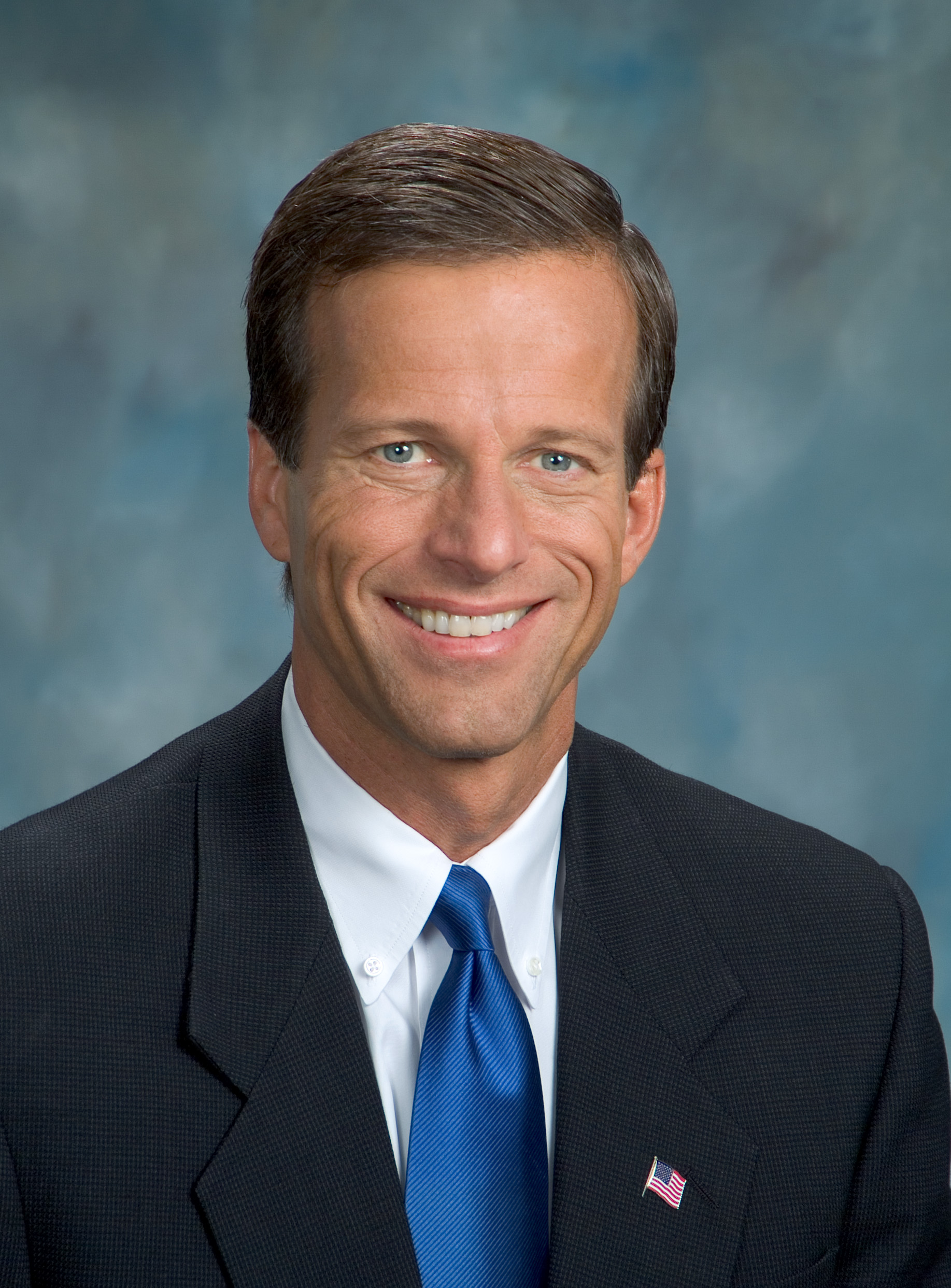
Nominee	Tim Johnson	John Thune
Party	Democratic	Republican
Popular vote	167,481	166,957
Percentage	49.6%	49.5%
- County results Johnson: 50–60% 60–70% 70–80% 80–90% >90% Thune: 40–50% 50–60% 60–70% 70–80%
U.S. senator before election
Tim Johnson
Democratic
Elected U.S. Senator
Tim Johnson
Democratic

Incumbent Democrat Tim Johnson won re-election to a second term by a margin of 524 votes, defeated Republican incumbent U.S. Representative John Thune.

Democratic primary results
Party	Candidate	Votes	%
Democratic	Tim Johnson (incumbent)	65,438	94.84%
Democratic	Herman Eilers	3,558	5.16%
Total votes		68,996	100.00%

Thune, who was considered a rising star in his party, ran against Tim Johnson, who narrowly won his first Senate election in 1996. Thune launched a television advertising campaign mentioning al Qaeda and Saddam Hussein, controversially contending that both were seeking nuclear weapons and that the country needed a missile defense system, something Johnson voted against 29 times and that Thune supported. Johnson attacked Thune for politicizing national security. President George W. Bush campaigned for Thune in late October. More than $20 million was spent in the election. Both candidates raised over $5 million each.

Johnson narrowly prevailed over Thune by a mere 524 votes. Despite the extreme closeness of the election, Thune did not contest the results, and conceded defeat on the late afternoon of November 9. Johnson's narrow victory may be attributed to his strong support in Oglala Lakota County. Thune also underperformed in typically Republican areas. Johnson was sworn in for a second term on January 3, 2003. Thune would later be elected to the other Senate seat in 2004, defeating Minority Leader Tom Daschle. He would then serve with Johnson in 2005.

General election
Party	Candidate	Votes	%	±%
Democratic	Tim Johnson (incumbent)	167,481	49.62%	−1.70%
Republican	John Thune	166,949	49.47%	+0.79%
Libertarian	Kurt Evans	3,070	0.91%	
Plurality		532	0.15%	-2.49%
Turnout		334,438		
Democratic hold		Swing		

== Tennessee ==
Tennessee election
- Turnout: 50.40% ▼12.37 pp
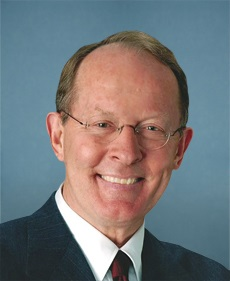

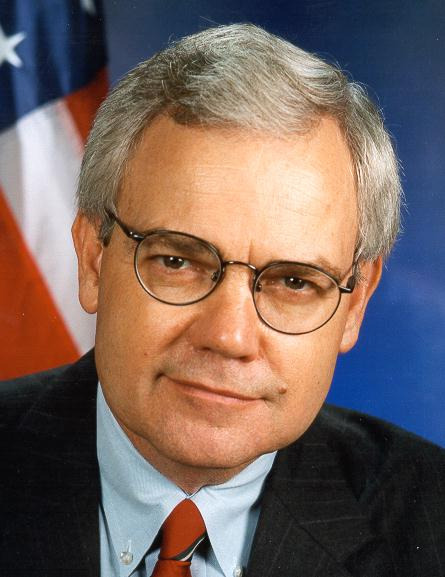
Nominee	Lamar Alexander	Bob Clement
Party	Republican	Democratic
Popular vote	891,498	728,232
Percentage	54.28%	44.34%
- Alexander: 40–50% 50–60% 60—70% 70–80% Clement: 40–50% 50–60% 60–70%
U.S. senator before election
Fred Thompson
Republican
Elected U.S. Senator
Lamar Alexander
Republican

Incumbent Republican Fred Thompson decided to retire. Republican Lamar Alexander, former U.S. secretary of education and former governor of Tennessee, won the open seat over Democrat Bob Clement, U.S. representative.

Republican primary results
Party	Candidate	Votes	%
Republican	Lamar Alexander	295,052	53.79%
Republican	Ed Bryant	233,678	42.60%
Republican	Mary Taylor-Shelby	5,589	1.02%
Republican	June Griffin	4,930	0.90%
Republican	Michael Brent Todd	4,002	0.73%
Republican	James E. DuBose	3,572	0.65%
Republican	Christopher G. Fenner	1,552	0.28%
Republican	Write-ins	107	0.03%
Total votes		548,482	100.00%

Democratic primary results
Party	Candidate	Votes	%
Democratic	Bob Clement	418,172	82.18%
Democratic	Gary G. Davis	50,563	9.94%
Democratic	Cher A. Hopkey	14,481	2.85%
Democratic	Michael L. Hampstead	12,940	2.54%
Democratic	Alvin M. Strauss	12,241	2.41%
Democratic	Write-ins	478	0.08%
Total votes		508,875	100.00%

Alexander raised $2 million through June 2002. Clement attacked the governor for his corporate connections and business dealings. By October, Clement had raised nearly $900,000, while Alexander had raised almost $3 million. Bush, who had a 60% approval rating in the state, helped campaign and raise money for Alexander. Alexander was also endorsed by the NRA.

General election
Party	Candidate	Votes	%	±%
Republican	Lamar Alexander	891,498	54.28%	−7.09%
Democratic	Bob Clement	728,232	44.34%	+7.52%
Independent	John Jay Hooker	6,401	0.39%	N/A
Independent	Wesley M. Baker	6,106	0.37%	N/A
Independent	Connie Gammon	5,349	0.33%	N/A
Independent	Karl Stanley Davidson	2,217	0.13%	N/A
Independent	Basil Marceaux	1,170	0.07%	N/A
Write-ins		356	0.02%	N/A
Majority		163,266	9.94%	−14.61%
Turnout		1,642,432	50.40%	
Republican hold		Swing		

== Texas ==
Texas election
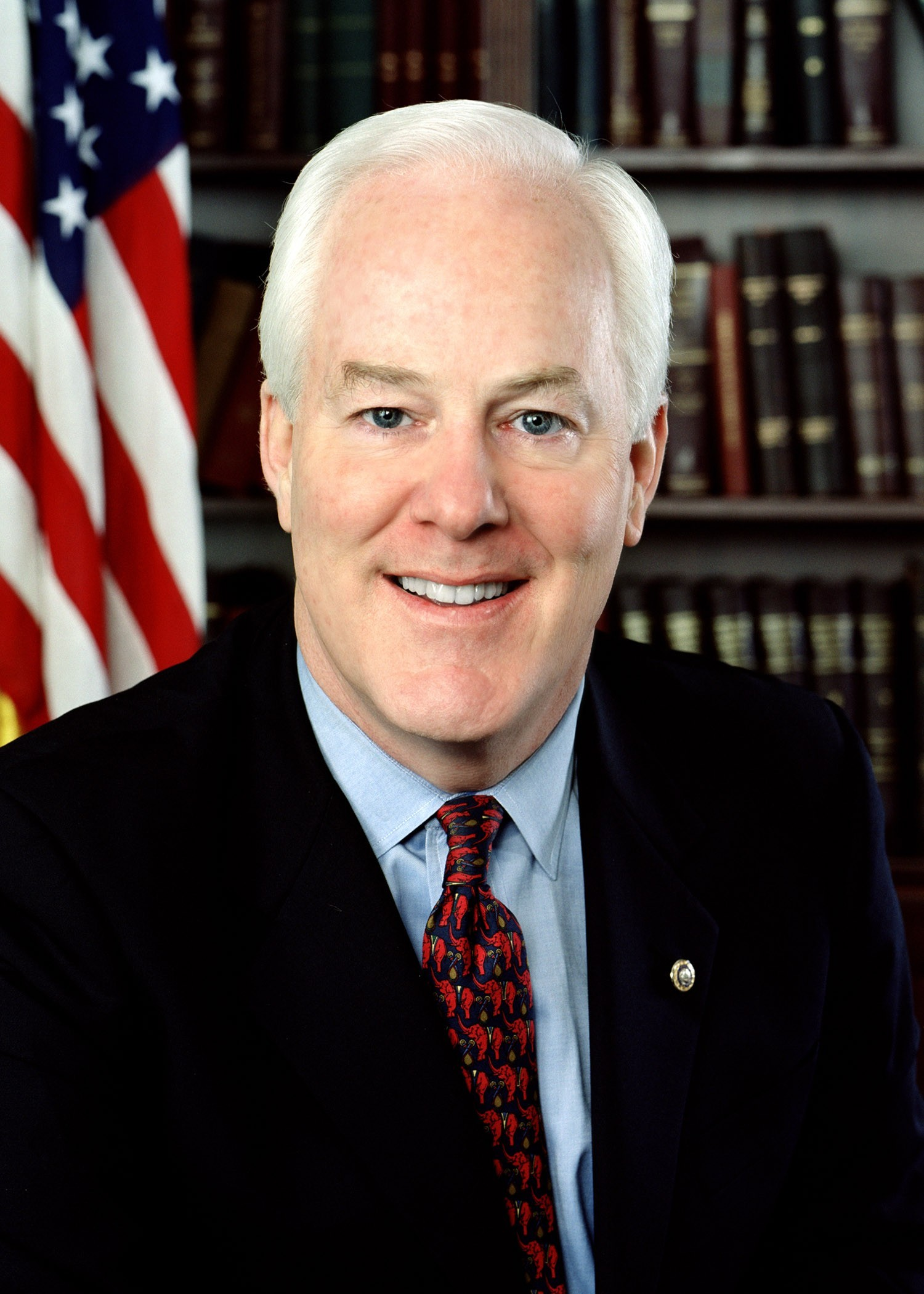

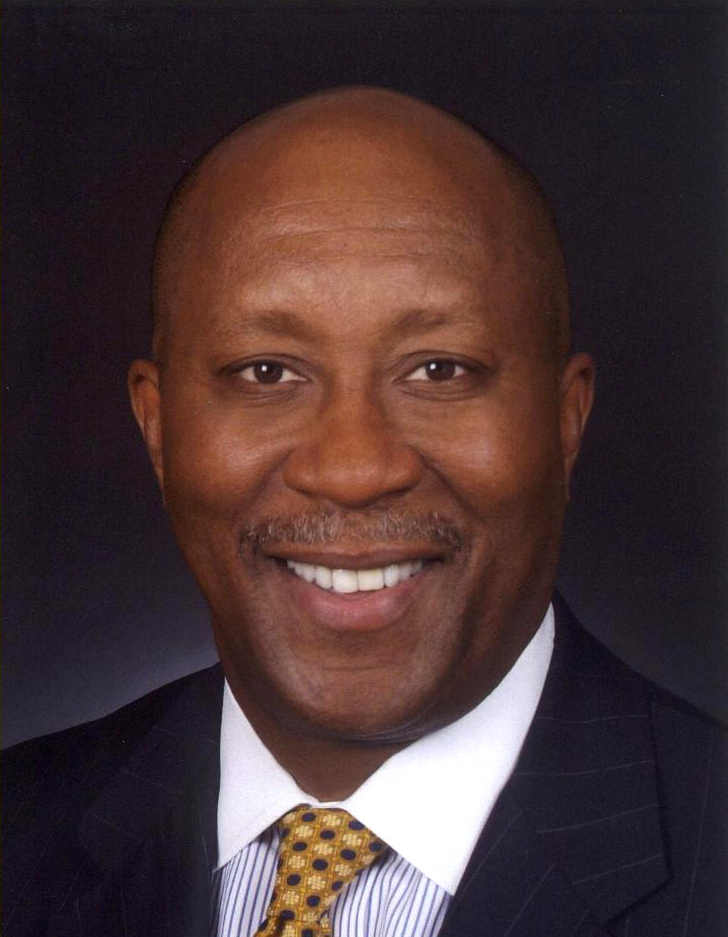
Nominee	John Cornyn	Ron Kirk
Party	Republican	Democratic
Popular vote	2,496,243	1,955,758
Percentage	55.3%	43.3%
- County results Cornyn: 40–50% 50–60% 60–70% 70–80% 80–90% Kirk: 40–50% 50–60% 60–70% 70–80% 80–90%
U.S. senator before election
Phil Gramm
Republican
Elected U.S. Senator
John Cornyn
Republican

Incumbent Republican Phil Gramm decided to retire instead of seeking a fourth term. Republican state Attorney General John Cornyn won the open seat over Democratic Dallas Mayor Ron Kirk.

Despite the fact that Texas is a red state, Kirk ran on a socially progressive platform: supporting abortion rights and opposing Bush judicial nominee Priscilla Owen, although Kirk was a former George W. Bush supporter. He also supported increases in defense spending, such as Bush's proposed $48 billion increase in military spending, except for the money Bush wanted to use for missile defense. Kirk had the support of former Governor Ann Richards and former U.S. senator Lloyd Bentsen.

Cornyn was criticized for taking campaign money from Enron and other controversial companies.

The race was perceived as competitive, with an October Dallas Morning News poll showing Cornyn leading 47% to 37%. However, Cornyn won election by 12 percent. A record $18 million was spent in the election.

General election
Party	Candidate	Votes	%	±%
Republican	John Cornyn	2,496,243	55.3%	
Democratic	Ron Kirk	1,955,758	43.3%	
Libertarian	Scott Jameson	35,538	0.8%	
Green	Roy Williams	25,051	0.6%	
Write-in	James W. Wright	1,422	0.0%	
Majority		540,485	11.97%	
Turnout		4,514,012		
Republican hold		Swing		

== Virginia ==
Virginia election
- November 4, 2002
- Turnout: 29.0% (voting eligible)
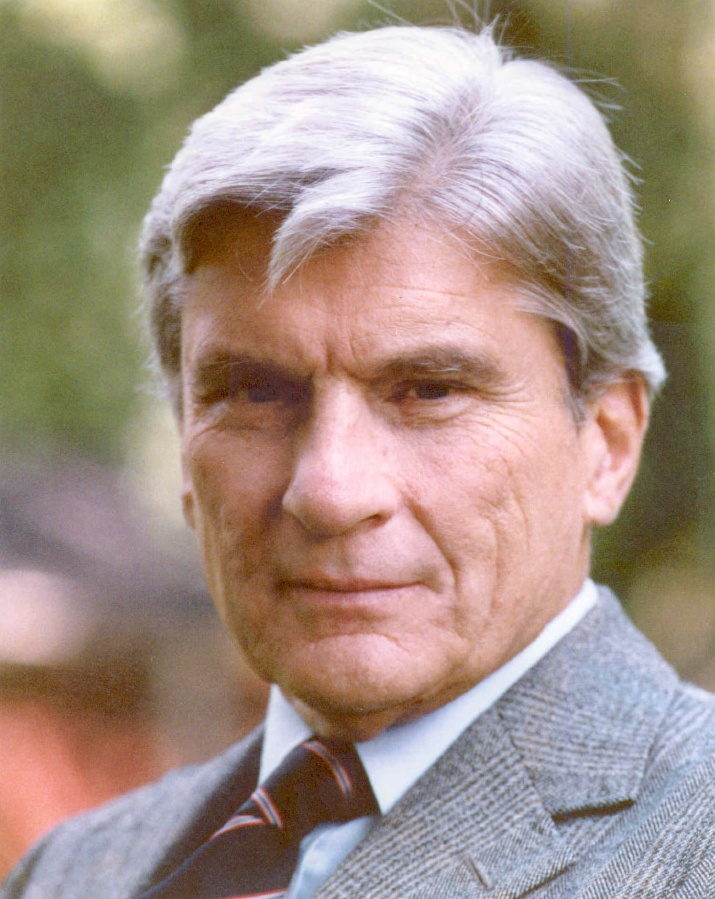

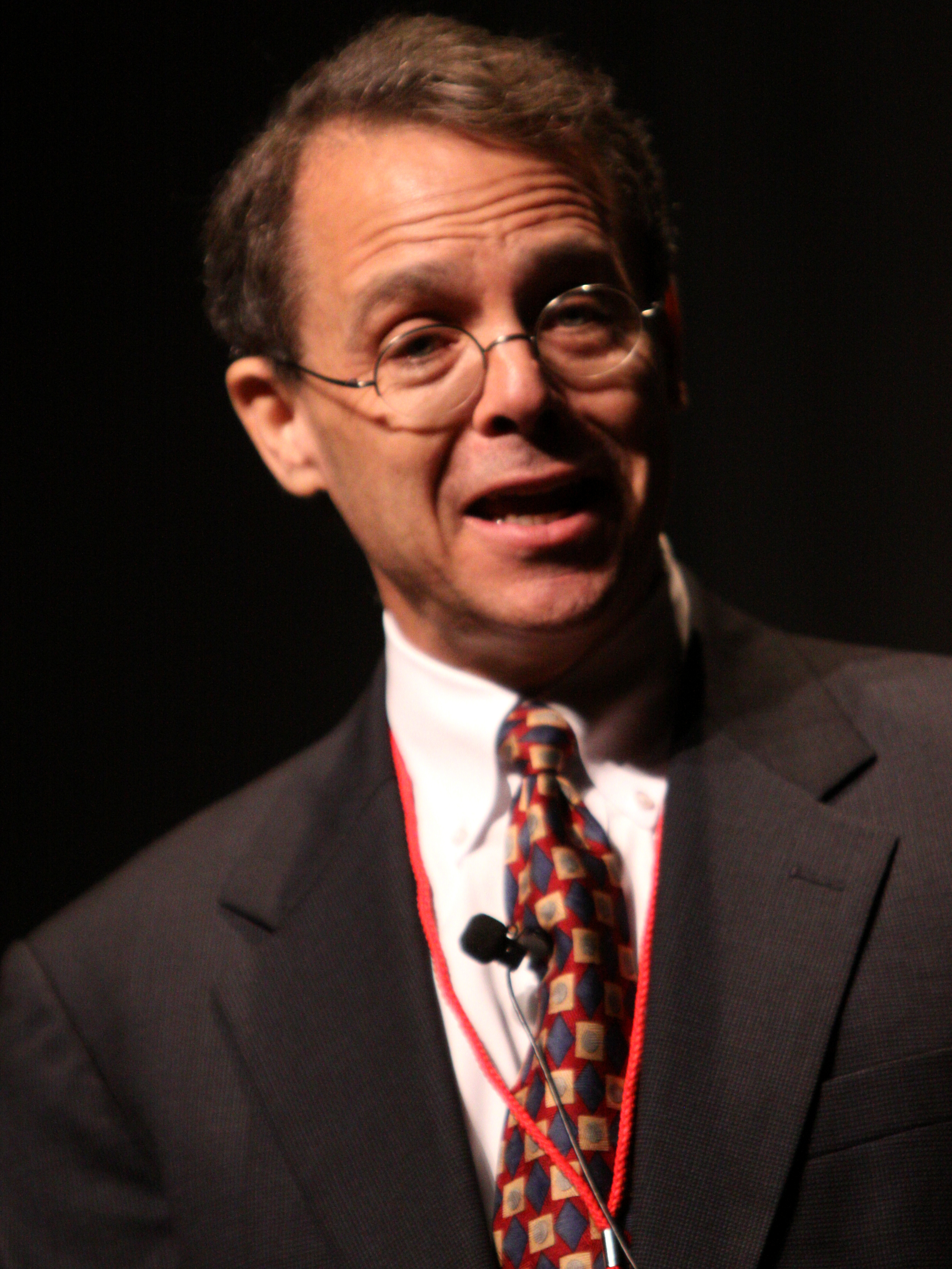
Nominee	John Warner	Nancy Spannaus
Party	Republican	Independent
Popular vote	1,229,894	145,102
Percentage	82.6%	9.7%
Nominee	Jacob Hornberger
Party	Independent
Popular vote	106,055
Percentage	7.1%
- County and independent city results Warner: 60–70% 70–80% 80–90% >90%
U.S. senator before election
John Warner
Republican
Elected U.S. Senator
John Warner
Republican

Incumbent Republican John Warner overwhelmingly won re-election to a fifth term, making him one of only three Virginia U.S. senators to serve five or more terms. No Democrat ran against Warner, and he won every single county and city in the state with at least 60% of the vote. As of 2022, this is the last Senate election in Virginia won by a Republican.

General election
Party	Candidate	Votes	%	±%
Republican	John Warner (incumbent)	1,229,894	82.58%	+30.10%
Independent	Nancy B. Spannaus	145,102	9.74%	
Independent	Jacob Hornberger	106,055	7.12%	
Write-ins		8,371	0.56%	+0.43%
Majority		1,084,792	72.83%	+67.75%
Turnout		1,489,422		
Republican hold		Swing		

== West Virginia ==
West Virginia election
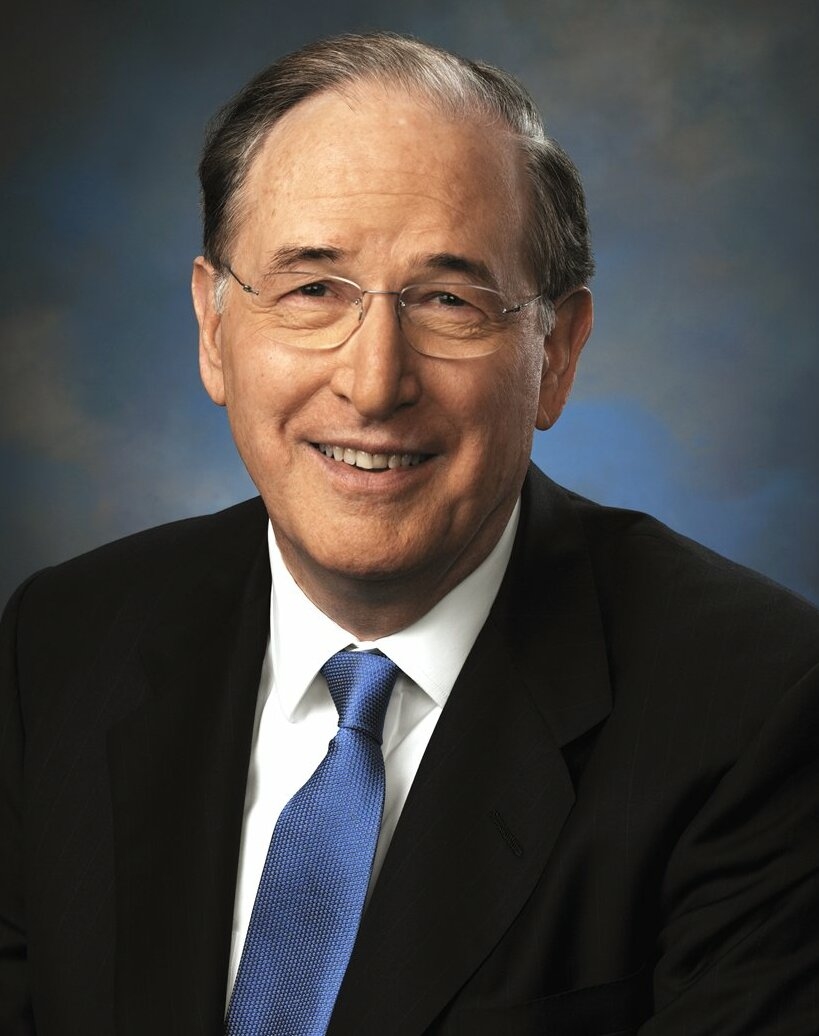

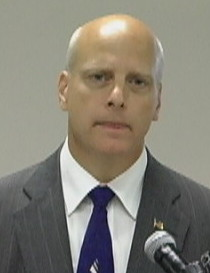
Nominee	Jay Rockefeller	Jay Wolfe
Party	Democratic	Republican
Popular vote	275,281	160,902
Percentage	63.11%	36.89%
- County results Rockefeller: 50–60% 60–70% 70–80% 80–90% Wolfe: 50–60%
U.S. senator before election
Jay Rockefeller
Democratic
Elected U.S. Senator
Jay Rockefeller
Democratic

Incumbent Democrat Jay Rockefeller easily won re-election to a fourth term over Republican state Senator Jay Wolfe.

Rockefeller was the heavy favorite, with one poll showed him leading 72% to 17%. Rockefeller had $2.9 million cash on hand, compared with Wolfe's $100,536 (in mid-October). Wolfe was endorsed by President George W. Bush and the NRA, but this wasn't enough to make the election competitive. Rockefeller won by a margin of over 25 percent.

General election
Party	Candidate	Votes	%	±%
Democratic	Jay Rockefeller (incumbent)	275,281	63.11%	−13.54%
Republican	Jay Wolfe	160,902	36.89%	+13.54%
Majority		114,379	26.22%	−27.08%
Turnout		436,183		
Democratic hold		Swing		

== Wyoming ==
Wyoming election
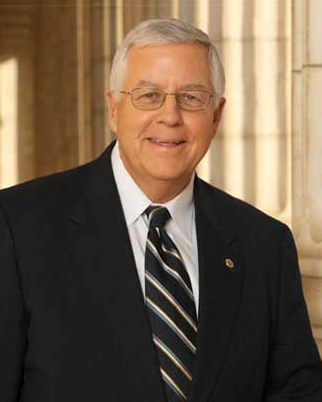

Nominee	Mike Enzi	Joyce Corcoran
Party	Republican	Democratic
Popular vote	133,710	49,570
Percentage	73.0%	27.0%
- County results Enzi: 50–60% 60–70% 70–80% 80–90%
U.S. senator before election
Mike Enzi
Republican
Elected U.S. Senator
Mike Enzi
Republican

Incumbent Republican Mike Enzi easily won re-election to a second term over Lander Mayor Joyce Corcoran.

Democratic primary results
Party	Candidate	Votes	%
Democratic	Joyce Corcoran	30,548	100.00%
Total votes		30,548	100.00%

Republican primary results
Party	Candidate	Votes	%
Republican	Mike Enzi (incumbent)	78,612	85.87%
Republican	Crosby Allen	12,931	14.13%
Total votes		91,543	100.00%

Enzi stated that his top priorities were education, jobs, national security and retirement security. He had $485,000 cash on hand in June 2002, when Joyce Corcoran (D), mayor of Lander, first filed.

General election
Party	Candidate	Votes	%	±%
Republican	Mike Enzi (incumbent)	133,710	72.95%	+18.90%
Democratic	Joyce Corcoran	49,570	27.05%	−15.17%
Majority		84,140	45.91%	+34.06%
Turnout		183,280		
Republican hold		Swing		

== See also ==
- 2002 United States elections
  - 2002 United States gubernatorial elections
  - 2002 United States House of Representatives elections
- 107th United States Congress
- 108th United States Congress
