= Gidwitz =

Gidwitz is a surname. Notable people with the surname include:

- Adam Gidwitz (born 1982), American children's book author
- Gerald Gidwitz (1906–2006), American businessman
- Ronald Gidwitz (born 1945), American businessman and diplomat
