= Henry Craig =

Henry Craig may refer to:

- Henry K. Craig (1791–1869), United States Army officer
- Henry Robertson Craig (1916–1984), Scottish landscape and flower painter
- Henry Hunter Craig (died 1876), American grocer, barber and politician who served in the Alabama House of Representatives
