= Ronald Gidwitz =

American business executive and ambassador (born 1945)

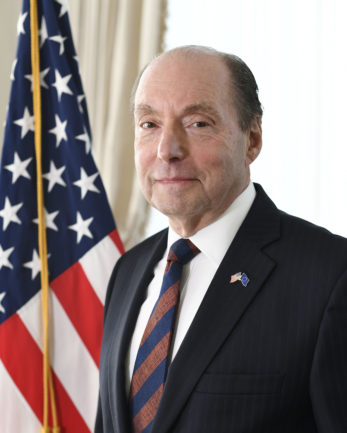
- official portrait, 2020

Acting United States Ambassador to the European Union
- In office May 4, 2020 – January 20, 2021
- President: Donald Trump
- Preceded by: Gordon Sondland
- Succeeded by: Mark Gitenstein

United States Ambassador to Belgium
- In office July 4, 2018 – January 20, 2021
- President: Donald Trump
- Preceded by: Denise Bauer
- Succeeded by: Michael M. Adler; Nicholas Berliner (acting)

Chairman of the Illinois State Board of Education
- In office April 1999 – April 18, 2003
- Appointed by: George Ryan
- Preceded by: Lou Mervis
- Succeeded by: Janet Steiner

Chairman of the Board of City Colleges of Chicago
- In office October 2, 1991 – 1999
- Appointed by: Richard M. Daley
- Preceded by: Reynaldo Glover

Personal details
- Born: March 28, 1945 (age 81)
- Party: Republican
- Children: 2
- Parent: Gerald Gidwitz (father)
- Education: Brown University (BA)

Ronald J. Gidwitz (born March 28, 1945) is an American businessman, diplomat, and political candidate who served as United States Ambassador to Belgium, while also serving as acting United States Ambassador to the European Union.

Gidwitz is the son of prominent Chicago businessman Gerald Gidwitz. Gidwtiz served as president and CEO of Helene Curtis Industries, which was sold to Unilever in 1996. In 1998, Gidwitz co-founded the private equity firm GCG Partners, in which he served as a partner.

In terms of public-sector and political activities, in addition to serving as ambassador, Gidwitz held the positions of chairman of the Illinois State Board of Education from 1999 through 2003 and chairman of the Board of City Colleges of Chicago from 1991 through 1999. He ran unsuccessfully for the Republican nomination for governor of Illinois in 2006. Gidwitz worked as the Illinois state chair for Rudy Giuliani's 2008 presidential campaign, the Illinois state finance chair for Donald Trump's 2016 presidential campaign, and chaired both Kirk Dillard's unsuccessful 2010 Illinois gubernatorial campaign and Bruce Rauner's successful 2014 Illinois gubernatorial campaign. He also worked as finance chair for the National Republican Senatorial Committee. Gidwitz has also been involved with political advocacy organizations. In addition to his private sector and political work, Gidwitz has been involved in philanthropic and nonprofit activities.

== Education ==
Gidwitz earned a Bachelor of Arts degree in economics from Brown University.

== Business career ==
Gidwitz served as president and CEO of Helene Curtis Industries, which was sold to Unilever in 1996. He served as its CEO from 1979 through 1998. Since 1998, he has been a co-founder and partner at the private equity firm, GCG Partners, and serves as a regional chairman for Business Executives for National Security in Chicago. Gidwitz's family owns a majority stake in Continental Materials Corp., whose board Gidwitz resigned from when he became ambassador.

For many years, a company controlled by Gidwitz and his cousin Ralph owned the Evergreen Terrace housing project in Joliet, Illinois, a 356-unit complex of high-rise apartments where 90% of tenants were families with young African-American single mothers. Their management of the complex attracted strong criticism, including from then-Senator Barack Obama. There were descriptions made of "inhumane conditions" and an overwhelming stench of urine in the complex. The mayor of Joliet described the complex as "unsafe and dangerous, a public nuisance and a blighted area". A judge declared that the standards were "deplorable". Gidwitz, in court, blamed the City of Joliet, claiming that they had repeatedly blocked attempts to secure federal financing for improvements. He especially noted his frustration in being turned down by the city in his effort to improve security—one of the main issues the same city had questioned.

== Political career ==
=== City of Chicago positions ===
Mayor Harold Washington appointed Gidwitz the Chairman of the Chicago Economic Development Commission. He retained this position during the mayoralty of Eugene Sawyer. Gidwitz was appointed chairman of the Board of City Colleges of Chicago by mayor Richard M. Daley in 1991. He was confirmed by the Chicago City Council on October 2, 1991. He replaced previous CCC chairman Reynaldo Glover. His appointment was seen as an effort by Daley to involve the business community in the city's education reform. His tenure ended when he resigned on April 14, 1999, amid a power struggle with the new chancellor Wayne Watson. Gidwitz's tenure was highly criticized by faculty in the system. Between 1991 and 1995, the system lost $50 million in high-risk investments.

=== Chairman of the Illinois State Board of Education ===
Gidwitz was appointed a member of the Illinois State Board of Education in 1999. Gidwitz soon became chairman of the Illinois State Board of Education in April 1999, having been nominated by Governor George Ryan.

In 1999, early into his tenure as chairman of the Illinois State Board of Education, Gidwitz made comments about the state's mathematics score on standardized testing, which accused the state's public school teachers of being inadequately trained on providing instruction on the subject. Superintendents of many school districts took issue to his remarks, with Paul Vallas (the CEO of Chicago Public Schools) remarking on Gidwitz, "he's not a supporter of public education, and he has a low opinion of teachers and schools in general."

Having again been nominated by Governor George Ryan, Gidwitz was reconfirmed by the Illinois Senate on November 14, 2001, to continue to serve as chairman of the Illinois State Board of Education. His term as board president expired on April 18, 2003. He continued to serve as a member of the board until the following year.

=== 2006 gubernatorial campaign ===
Gidwitz was a candidate for the Republican nomination for Governor of Illinois in the 2006 election. He came in fourth place, having been defeated by Judy Baar Topinka. Democratic incumbent Rod Blagojevich would go on to win the general election.

Gidwitz spent $5.3 million of his own funds on the campaign, which was then a record amount of self-financing for an Illinois gubernatorial campaign. This would not be surpassed until Bruce Rauner's 2014 campaign. Gidwitz co-endorsed and jointly campaigned with State Senator Steve Rauschenberger as his preferred choice of running mate. The lieutenant gubernatorial nominee was selected by voters in the coinciding lieutenant gubernatorial primary (which was held sperately from the gubernatorial primary).

Lacking name recognition, his campaign spent large sums on early advertising in media markets such as Quincy. His campaign would later run attack ads against Topinka, which characterized her as being supportive of large government spending and unsuited for bringing reforms to the state government.

Gidwitz received the endorsement of the editorial board of the Chicago Tribune.

=== Ambassadorship ===
In May 2018, he was nominated to become the Trump administration's Ambassador to Belgium. He was confirmed by the U.S. Senate on June 28, 2018. He presented his credentials to King Philippe on July 4, 2018.

On May 4, Trump named Gidwitz to additionally serve as the interim ambassador to the European Union, replacing Gordon Sondland (who had been fired the previous month after having provided testimony for the impeachment inquiry into Trump).

=== Other political work ===
In February 2003, Gidwitz founded the advocacy group Students First Illinois.

In 2008, Gidwitz and Greg Baise formed the Economic Freedom Alliance, a 527 organization, to oppose the passage of the Employee Free Choice Act.

Gidwitz was the Illinois co-chair of Rudy Giuliani's 2008 presidential campaign. In the early stages of the Republican primaries for the 2016 presidential election, Gidwitz was a supporter of the candidacy of Jeb Bush. Gidwitz subsequently gave his support to the campaign of Donald Trump, and served as Trump's Illinois campaign finance chairman. In the summer of 2016, Gidwitz met with Republican National Committee chairman Reince Priebus to urge him to pressure Trump into being more disciplined in his messaging against Democratic presidential nominee Hillary Clinton. On October 31, 2016, Gidwitz organized a meeting at Trump International Hotel and Tower Chicago between Trump and wealthy Republican donors.

Gidwitz served as campaign chairman and finance chair of Kirk Dillard's unsuccessful 2010 Illinois gubernatorial campaign. Gidwitz served as campaign co-chair and finance chair for Bruce Rauner's successful 2014 bid for Illinois governor. He was a key early supporter of Rauner's campaign, and ultimately contributed $55,300 in funding to support Rauner's campaign.

By 2016, Gidwitz had established himself as one of the Republican Party's largest Illinois campaign donors. He gave large amounts to Republican national campaigns. In 2016 alone, he gave $700,000 to Trump, pro-Trump PACs, Republican House and Senate candidates, and national Republican organizations. He also gave to state and local Republicans in Illinois. From 1991 through 2016, he gave $1.3 million in contributions to Republican state and local candidates, party organizations, and causes.

In 2022, Gidwitz served as finance chair for the National Republican Senatorial Committee. He continued to work with the committee in 2024, and attended the 2024 Republican National Convention to assist its fundraising efforts. In the 2024 Republican Party presidential primaries, Gidwitz endorsed former New Jersey Governor Chris Christie.

== Nonprofit work ==
During his business career, Gidwitz devoted a portion of his time to philanthropic activities. He was Chair of the Field Museum of Natural History Board of Trustees, and the Economic Development Commission of Chicago. Gidwitz also served on the boards of the Council for Aid to Education, Rush-Presbyterian-St. Luke's Medical Center, National Board of the Smithsonian Institution, the Museum of Science and Industry, Lyric Opera of Chicago, Chicagoland Chamber of Commerce and the founding Chair of the Chicago Chapter of Business Executives for National Security. In 2006, the Boys & Girls Clubs of America bestowed him with the Herbert Hoover Humanitarian Award for his "extraordinary service to the organization and the nation's youth." In 2014, the Chicago History Museum gave him the Bertha Honoré Palmer Making History Award for Distinction in Civic Leadership. His leadership in promoting better educational opportunities resulted in Gidwitz receiving the National Association of State Boards of Education's Distinguished Service Award in 2003.

Since 2013, Gidwitz has served as chairman emeritus of the Boys & Girls Clubs of America.

== Personal life ==
Gidwitz is the son of prominent Chicago businessman, Gerald Gidwitz. He lives in Chicago with his wife, Christina Gidwitz (née Kemper), and two sons. His wife Christina's father was the late James S. Kemper.

Diplomatic posts
Preceded by Denise Bauer	United States Ambassador to Belgium; 2018–2021	Succeeded by Nicholas Berliner; Chargé d'Affaires
Preceded by Gordon Sondland	United States Ambassador to the European Union; Acting; 2020–2021	Succeeded by Mark Gitenstein
