= Ann McLaughlin Korologos =

American politician and businesswoman (1941–2023)

Ann McLaughlin
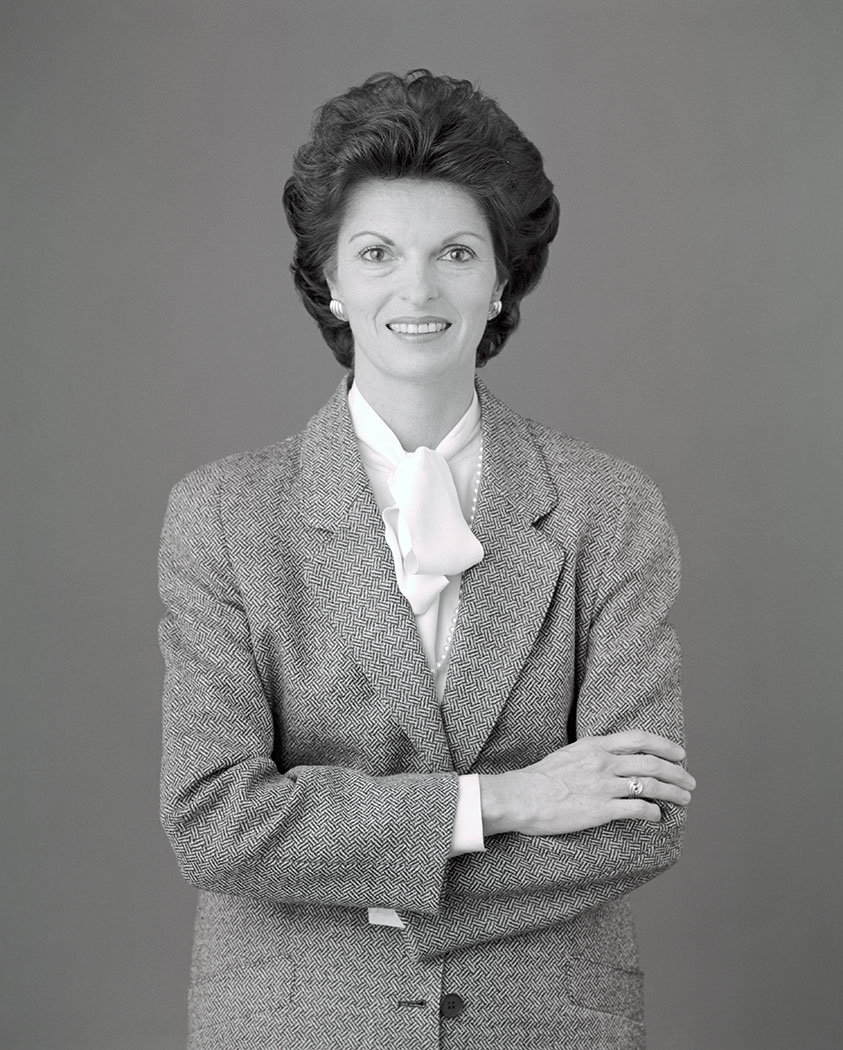

19th United States Secretary of Labor
- In office December 14, 1987 – January 20, 1989
- President: Ronald Reagan
- Deputy: Dennis Whitfield
- Preceded by: Bill Brock
- Succeeded by: Elizabeth Dole

Personal details
- Born: Ann Marie Lauenstein; November 16, 1941 Chatham, New Jersey, U.S.
- Died: January 30, 2023 (aged 81) Salt Lake City, Utah, U.S.
- Party: Republican
- Spouses: William Dore (divorced); John McLaughlin (m. 1975; div. 1992); Tom Korologos (m. 2000)
- Children: Paula (stepchild with Korologos)
- Education: Fordham University (BA); University of Pennsylvania (MBA)

Ann McLaughlin Korologos (born Ann Marie Lauenstein; November 16, 1941 – January 30, 2023), formerly known as Ann Dore McLaughlin, was an American corporate executive who served as the 19th United States secretary of labor from 1987 to 1989.

== Life and career ==
Born and raised in Chatham, New Jersey, Ann Marie Lauenstein was the daughter of Marie (née Koellhoffer) and Edward Joseph Lauenstein, a manufacturer representative for a wartime ammunitions company. She had one sibling, an older brother. She was educated at Saint Patrick School in Chatham, the Academy of Saint Elizabeth, and Marymount College, Tarrytown of Fordham University, where she spent a year studying abroad at the University of London. She earned an Executive MBA from the Wharton School at the University of Pennsylvania in 1988.

She received honorary degrees from Marymount, the University of Rhode Island, the New England School of Law, the College of Saint Elizabeth, and Tri-State University.

In 1972 and 1973, she served as the press secretary for the Inaugural Concerts for Nixon's second inauguration. In 1987, she was appointed to the presidential cabinet as Secretary of Labor by Ronald Reagan. Before becoming the Labor Secretary, she had served in the Reagan administration as Under Secretary of the Department of the Interior and as Under Secretary of the Department of the Treasury.

From 1990 to 1995, she was head of the Federal City Council, a group of business, civic, education, and other leaders interested in economic development in Washington, D.C. From 1996 to 2000, she was the chair of the Aspen Institute. From 2000 to 2006, she was on the board of directors of Microsoft, from which she resigned due to "increasing demands on her time from other professional and personal commitments".

In 2008, she was on the District of Columbia Republican presidential primary ballot as a John McCain delegate.

McLaughlin Korologos served as a member of the board of directors of several companies, including Fannie Mae, Vulcan Materials Company, and the Kellogg Company, and from 2004 to 2009 served as chairman of the RAND Corporation board of trustees.

Previously, she was married to William Dore, a financial investor. In 1975, she married the political commentator and former Jesuit priest John McLaughlin, after having served as his campaign manager in his 1970 failed challenge against Senator John Orlando Pastore for his Rhode Island seat in the United States Senate. They divorced in 1992.

In 2000, Ann McLaughlin married Tom C. Korologos, a former U.S. Ambassador to Belgium who had been appointed by George W. Bush. He also had been a lobbyist before becoming a White House aide during the Nixon and Ford administration. His photography was exhibited in the art gallery she purchased in 2007.

She died from complications of meningitis on January 30, 2023, at the age of 81.

== Ann Korologos Gallery ==
Korologos was an avid art collector, and in 2007 she purchased the Basalt Gallery, of Basalt, Colorado. In June 2009, the gallery outgrew its old location and moved to a larger space downtown. She changed the name to the Ann Korologos Gallery at the same time. The gallery exhibits contemporary Western American Art, and artists influenced by the American West, including Veryl Goodnight, Gordon Gund, Michael Kessler (artist), Tom Korologos, Tomas Lasansky (son of famed artist Mauricio Lasansky), Lloyd Schermer, Peter Campbell, Neil Clifford, Heather Foster, Terry Gardner, Lisa Gordon, Ewoud de Groot, Donna Howell-Sickles, Peggy Judy, Sandra Kaplan, Paula Schuette Kraemer, Sarah Lamb, Amy Laugesen, Linda Lillegraven, Leon Loughridge, Janet Nelson, Joel Ostlind, Deborah Paris, Brett Scheifflee, Nathan Solano, Kate Starling, Allison Stewart, Sabrina Stiles, Andy Taylor, Sean Wallis (son of Kent R. Wallis), Mike Weber, Angus Wilson, Simon Winegar, Marie Figge Wise, Michael Wisner, Dinah Worman, Sherrie York, and Dan Young.

== See also ==
- List of female United States Cabinet members

Political offices
Preceded by Bill Brock	United States Secretary of Labor; 1987–1989	Succeeded by Elizabeth Dole
