= Henry Shelton Sanford =

American diplomat (1823–1891)

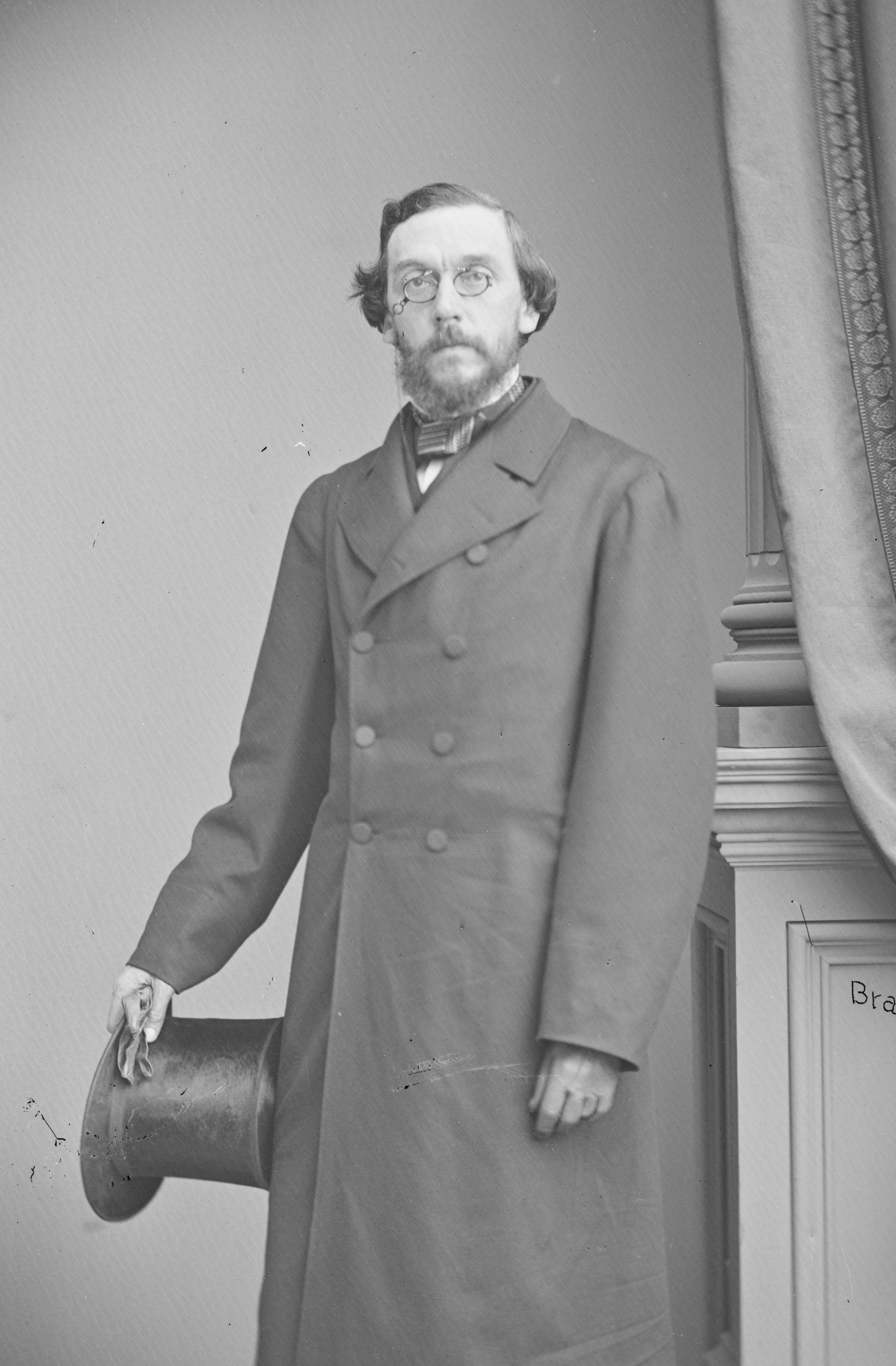
- Henry S. Sanford in c. 1865

United States Ambassador to Belgium
- In office 1861–1869
- President: Abraham Lincoln; Andrew Johnson
- Preceded by: Elisha Y. Fair
- Succeeded by: Joseph Russell Jones

Personal details
- Born: Henry Shelton Sanford; June 15, 1823 Woodbury, Connecticut, US
- Died: May 21, 1891 (aged 67) Healing Springs, Virginia, US
- Party: Republican
- Spouse: Gertrude Ellen Dupuy (m. 1864)
- Children: 7
- Parent: Nehemiah Curtis Sanford (father)
- Education: Cheshire Academy; Trinity College; Heidelberg University
- Profession: Diplomat, businessman, founder of Sanford, Florida

Henry Shelton Sanford (June 15, 1823 – May 21, 1891) was an American diplomat and businessman from Connecticut who served as United States Minister to Belgium from 1861 to 1869. He is also known for founding the city of Sanford, Florida and for successfully lobbying the United States into recognizing King Leopold II's claim to the Congo region in Central Africa, the area that would become Leopold's privately-controlled Congo Free State.

== Biography ==
=== Early life ===
Sanford was born in Woodbury, Connecticut into a family with deep New England roots. He was the son of Nancy Bateman Shelton (1800–1880) and Nehemiah Curtis Sanford, who made his fortune manufacturing brass tacks and served in the Connecticut Senate for the 16th District. He was a descendant of Governor Thomas Welles, who arrived in 1635 and was the only man in Connecticut's history to hold all four top offices: governor, deputy governor, treasurer, and secretary. He was also the transcriber of the Fundamental Orders. Nehemiah C. Sanford's brother was John Sanford, the founder of the Amsterdam, New York branch of the Sanford family.

=== Education ===
Henry Shelton Sanford enrolled in Trinity College in 1839 but did not graduate. Trinity College later conferred on him the degree of L.L.D. in 1849. He was also educated at Heidelberg University, Germany from which institution he received the degree of Doctor of Canon and Civil Law or J.U.D. in 1855. He obtained the title of ‘General,’ which he is often noted by, after donating a cannon battery to the Union in the Civil War.

Sanford began diplomatic work in 1847, when he was named the Secretary of the American legation to St. Petersburg. In 1848, he was named acting Secretary to the American Legation in Frankfurt. President Zachary Taylor then appointed him to the same post in Paris, where he would remain from 1849 to 1854, the last year of which after a promotion to chargé d'affaires.

=== Minister to Belgium ===
President Abraham Lincoln appointed him as Minister to Belgium in 1861. There, apart from preventing Confederate recognition, he signed a number of significant agreements, including the Scheldt Treaties, concerning import duties and the capitalization of the Scheldt dues (1863), a naturalization treaty, and a consular convention including a trademark article supplemental to the commercial treaty of 1858.

In addition, Sanford co-ordinated northern secret service operations during the Civil War, arranged for the purchase of war materials for the Union, and delivered a message from Secretary of State William H. Seward to Giuseppe Garibaldi, offering the Italian patriot a Union command.

After the Civil War he bought an orange grove in St. Augustine, Florida, from John Hay, who had been one of President Lincoln's secretaries and later served as U.S. Secretary of State. It was the beginning of a large investment in the state. The St. Augustine grove was later developed as a real estate subdivision in the northern part of the city's historic Lincolnville neighborhood. It includes a Sanford Street as a permanent memory of its origins.

=== Marriage and family ===
He married on September 21, 1864, in Paris, France, to Gertrude Ellen Dupuy (27 June 1841 "du Puy Place", Banks-of-the-Schuylkill, Philadelphia, Pennsylvania – 1 June 1902 Derby, Connecticut), daughter of John Dupuy and Mary Richards Haskins. Henry and Gertrude's children were:

- Henry Shelton Sanford Jr., born on July 17, 1865, at the U. S. Legation, Brussels, Belgium, and died on October 1, 1891, in New York City.
- Gertrude Ellen Dupuy Sanford, born on November 16, 1869, in Brussels, Belgium, and died on April 28, 1893, New York City.
- Frida Dolores Sanford, born on February 28, 1871, in Brussels, Belgium
- Ethel Sanford, born on September 2, 1873, in Brussels, Belgium. She married her cousin on February 17, 1892, in Sanford, Florida, John Sanford (1851), the eldest son of Hon. Stephen Sanford and Sarah Jane Cochran and a grandson of John Sanford (1803), a U.S. Representative from New York and founder of a carpet manufacturing firm in New York.
- Helen Carola Nancy Sanford, born April 10, 1876, Brussels, Belgium
- Leopold Curits Sanford, born July 27, 1880, in Brussels, Belgium and died December 1, 1885, at Chateau de Gingelona, Belgium
- Edwyn Emeline Willimine Gladys McKinnon Sanford, born on November 27, 1882, Brussels, Belgium

He was nominated by President Ulysses S. Grant in 1869 as U.S. Minister to Spain. His Senate confirmation, which was long discussed, was tabled due solely on the grounds that he was unwilling to move to Spain. As soon as President Grant appointed General Daniel Sickles U.S. Minister to Spain, he resigned his post at Belgium.

=== Investment in Florida ===
In 1868 Sanford began to invest his money in Florida, purchasing 12,547 acres of land in central Florida and founding the town which bears his name. He also established the 100 acre Bel Air Grove which at the time was the largest grove in the state. He then began experimenting with 100 varieties of citrus plantings which led to the production of new quality citrus fruits including the Jaffa, Mediterranean Sweet, and the Villa Francean. Sanford continued to travel throughout the United States and the world.

In 1870, Sanford paid $18,400 to former Confederate General Joseph Finegan to acquire his extensive land holdings along Lake Monroe and founded the city of Sanford, Florida. He founded an orange plantation at Lake Monroe that offered some promise to revive his flagging fortunes, but it did not prove profitable in the long term. In fact he poured quite a bit of precious capital into land speculation and town building in Florida in the hopes of turning around a family economy that spent far more than it took in, but with no success. The commitment of his time and resources to cashing in on the postbellum Florida land boom was a miserable failure in the end. His wife was so disgruntled with his booster schemes that she lamented in a letter to her husband that Florida was "a vampire that... sucked the repose & the beauty & the dignity & cheerfulness out of our lives." Sanford had numerous other business interests, some in the Congo after his work for Belgium, but none were profitable.

=== Work for Leopold II of Belgium ===
In 1876 he was named acting Delegate of the American Geographical Society to a conference called by King Leopold II of Belgium to organize the International African Association with the purpose of opening up equatorial Africa to civilizing influences. Leopold II used Sanford to convince Henry Morton Stanley to explore the Congo basin for Belgium in 1878. He then hired Sanford in 1883 as his envoy to the United States to try to gain American recognition for his colony in the Congo Basin, which became known as the Congo Free State.

In 1885, Sanford expressed the hope that African Americans could be removed to the Congo Free State to make it a "Canaan for our modern Israelites" and clear the U.S. of a "black cloud."

In 1886, Sanford organized in Brussels and dispatched to the Congo and its tributaries the Sanford Exploring Expedition for the purpose of scientific and commercial discovery and for the opening up of an interior trade. His steamboats "Florida" and "New York" were the first commercial steamers to penetrate the waters of the upper Congo. Sanford employed Roger Casement from September 1886 to February 1888 on the Expedition, working on river transports. His project did not prosper partly because the Congo State was becoming increasingly restrictive in its attitude to other commercial interests.

In 1888, the Sanford Exploring Expedition merged with the Compagnie du Congo pour le Commerce et l'Industrie (CCCI) to create the Société anonyme belge pour le commerce du Haut-Congo (SAB). Sanford remained loyal to the Belgian king until 1889 and served as the American representative at Leopold's Anti-Slavery Conference. Leopold then betrayed his earlier free trade plans for the Congo and asked for the imposition of customs duties to aid the destruction of slavery in the Congo.

=== Further business ventures ===
His efforts on overseas matters resulted in his Florida groves failing as a lucrative business. To meet his labor shortages, Sanford brought 100 workers from Sweden and agreed to pay for their passage after one year of labor. His workers eventually formed the settlement called New Uppsala. In 1881, Sanford brought 75 more Swedish workers to his groves under the same arrangement. Sanford then founded the "Tropical Garden" research station which conducted remarkable experiments in plant and fruit growth.

=== Death ===
Sanford died at Healing Springs, Virginia on May 21, 1891. He is buried in Long Hill Cemetery, Shelton, Connecticut.

== Legacy ==
In her will of 1901, Gertrude Sanford expressed a desire that the city of Sanford, Florida have her husband's library as his memorial. Her daughter, Carola Sanford-Dow fulfilled this wish and in 1969 the Henry Shelton Sanford Memorial Library and Museum was built to house the books, papers, and decorative arts collection of Gen. Sanford. The museum was expanded in 1973 and again in 1993, at which time the name was changed to the Sanford Museum.

He also appears in Mario Vargas Llosa's Nobel Prize–winning novel, The Dream of the Celt.

== Notes ==
Preceded by Elisha Y. Fair	Ambassador to Belgium; 1861–1869	Succeeded by Joseph Russell Jones
