= Harbour Group Industries =

American private equity firm

- Founded: 1976
- Headquarters: St. Louis, United States

Harbour Group Industries is an American corporate holding company, based in St. Louis, Missouri.

The company primarily owns and seeks the acquisition of North American manufacturing companies involved in several diverse sectors, including auto accessories, plastic-processing equipment, music, and entertainment.

Until 2007, founder and former CEO Sam Fox controlled Harbour Group, but he resigned his position to assume his role as the United States Ambassador to Belgium. As of 2018 Harbour Group partnered with 200 businesses across 43 industries.

== See also ==
- Sam Fox
