= Joseph Russell Jones =

American politician and businessman

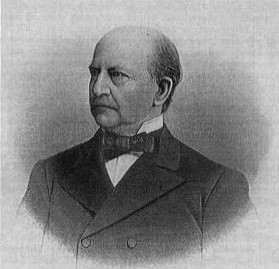
- Born: February 17, 1823; Conneaut, Ohio
- Died: April 11, 1909 (aged 86); Chicago, Illinois
- Occupations: Businessman and politician

Joseph Russell Jones (February 17, 1823 – April 11, 1909) was a successful American merchant and politician, a close friend of Ulysses S. Grant and an acquaintance of Abraham Lincoln.

== Biography ==
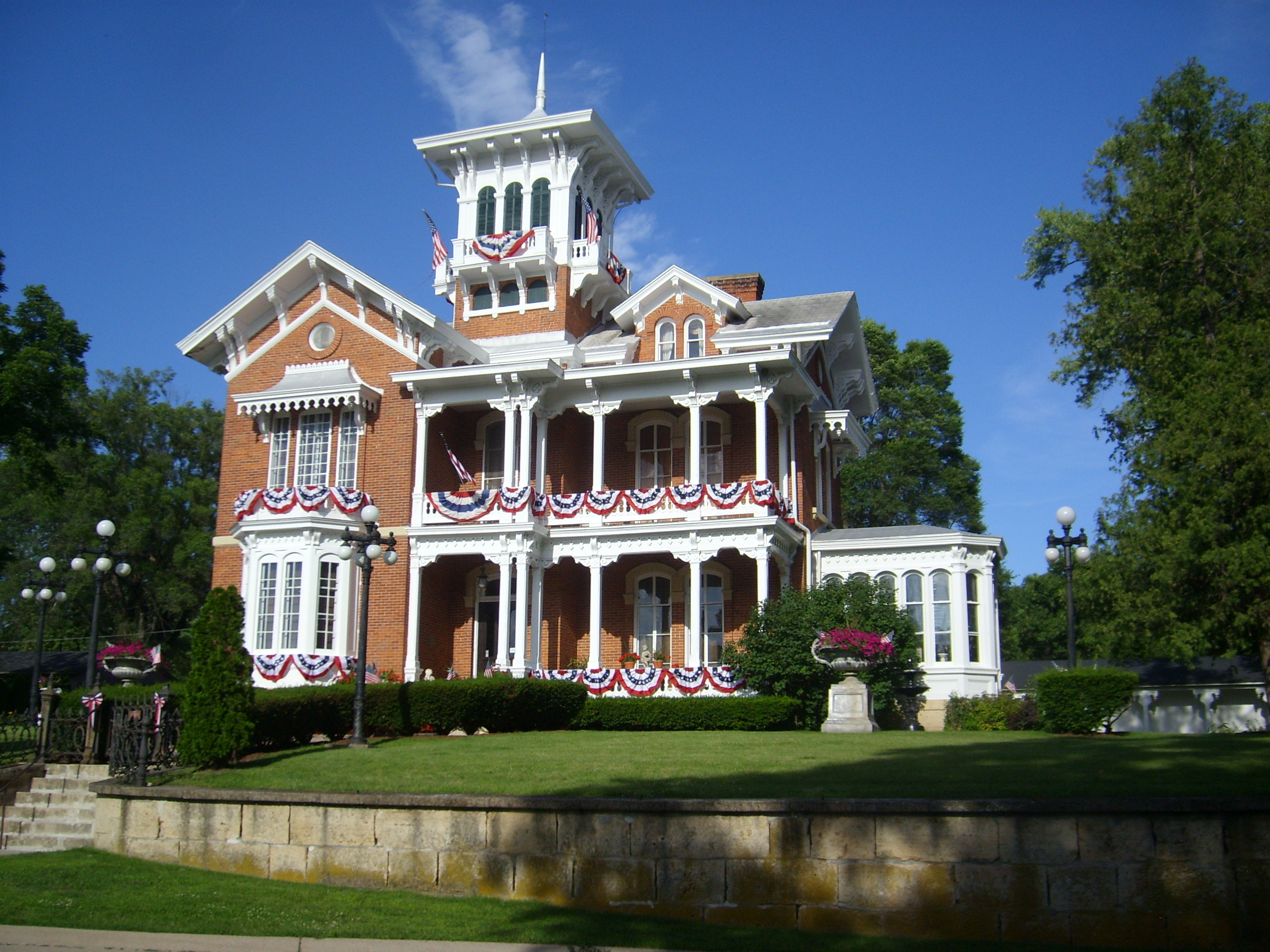
Belvedere Mansion, Galena, Illinois, 2009

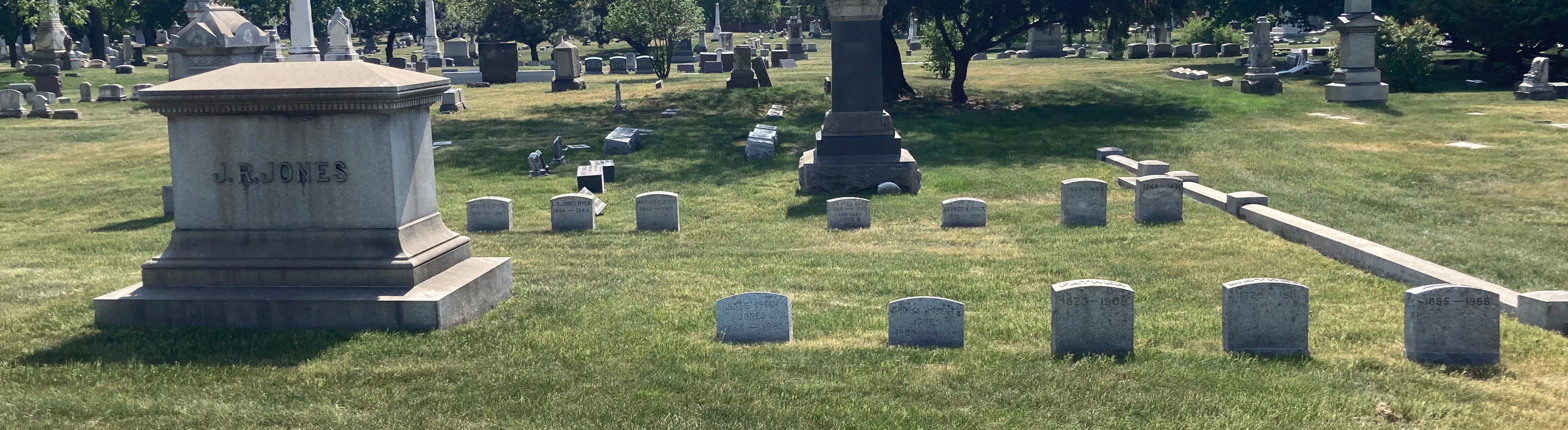
Jones' grave

Jones was born in Conneaut, Ohio, and his childhood was modest. His father died when he was two, necessitating the young Jones to curtail his formal education. At age 13, his career began as a store clerk. At 25, Jones had risen to become a partner in the mercantile firm of Benjamin H. Campbell in Galena, Illinois. This success gave Jones the financial means to build one of the grandest homes in Galena. His Italianate villa, Belvedere Mansion, was situated next to the Greek revival mansion of Elihu Washburne, who was a prominent attorney and U.S. congressman (1853–1869). The neighbors developed a rich friendship, which was highly beneficial to Jones’ political career.

In 1860, Jones was elected to the Illinois House of Representatives. The same year, Ulysses S. Grant (1822–1885) moved to Galena after resigning as a captain in the army. In Illinois, Grant struggled financially as an assistant in his father's leather shop. Grant became friends with Jones and Washburne whose recommendations aided his return to the army when the Civil War began.

Jones, as an enterprising businessman, saw financial opportunity in the lack of cotton in the North due to wartime restrictions. His friendship with Grant provided him with the necessary passes to bring Southern cotton to the North where it could be sold for significant profit. Their friendship extended beyond the political domain. Grant aided Jones in his cotton speculations, and Jones in return provided Grant with financial assistance.

In 1861, Abraham Lincoln became president and appointed Jones as U.S. Marshall for the Northern District of Illinois. Lincoln consulted Jones, Grant's confidant, to learn if Grant was planning to run against him in the next election. After President Lincoln was assassinated, Jones served as a pallbearer for Lincoln's funeral train procession in Chicago.

In 1869, Grant was sworn in as president and nominated Jones as Minister Resident to Belgium. In 1875, Jones asked to leave his post in Belgium. He returned to Illinois where Grant made him Collector of the Port of Chicago. However, a year later Grant, urged by Generals John A. Logan and Stephen A. Hurlbut, asked Jones to resign. This request, perceived as a public disgrace Jones felt at the hands of his old friend, severed their friendship permanently. Jones resumed various business ventures with continued financial success. He died at the age of 86 in Chicago, Illinois.

| Preceded by Henry Shelton Sanford | Ambassador to Belgium; 1869–1875 | Succeeded by Ayres Phillips Merrill |
