= List of ambassadors of the United States to Belgium =

Ambassador of the United States to Belgium
- Ambassadeur van de Verenigde Staten in België; Ambassadeur des États-Unis en Belgique; Botschafter der Vereinigten Staaten in Belgien
- Seal of the United States Department of State

- Flag of a United States ambassador

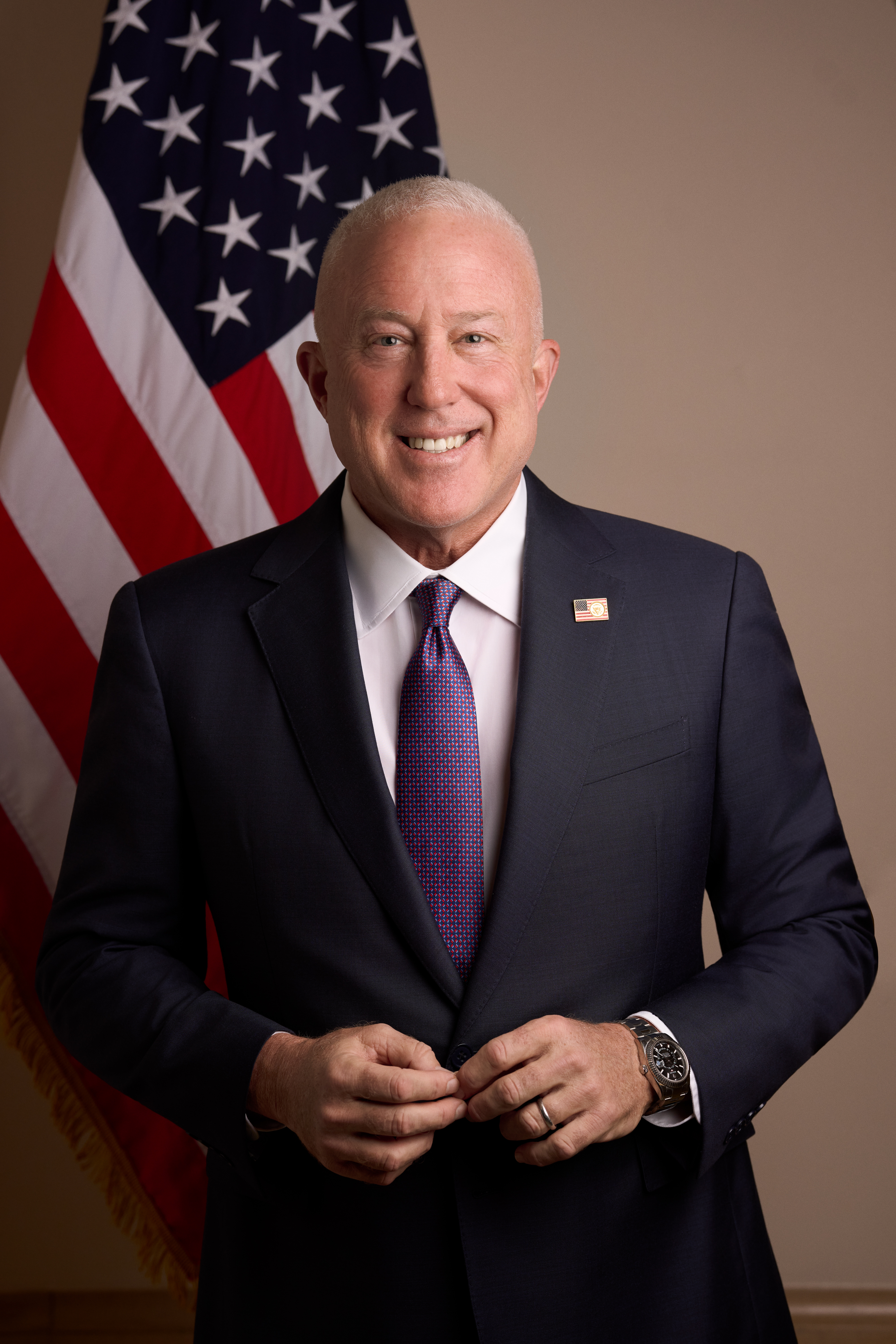
- Incumbent; Bill White since November 13, 2025
- Nominator: The president of the United States
- Appointer: The president with Senate advice and consent
- Inaugural holder: Hugh S. Legaré as Chargé d'Affaires
- Formation: 1832
- Website: U.S. Embassy - Brussels

In 1832, shortly after the creation of the Kingdom of Belgium, the United States established diplomatic relations. Since that time, a long line of distinguished envoys have represented American interests in Belgium. These diplomats included men and women whose career paths would lead them to become Secretary of States (Hugh S. Legaré), Secretary of Commerce (Charles Sawyer) and Chair of the Federal Trade Commission (Joseph E. Davies).

Belgian-American Relations were cemented when Brand Whitlock, as representative of the neutral United States, worked during World War I to bring humanitarian aid to help millions of Belgians in danger of starvation caused by the British blockade and the German occupation.

Future envoys found themselves working through the Marshall Plan, the foundation of the North Atlantic Treaty Organization and joint efforts with the European Union. In 1944, when Franklin D. Roosevelt appointed Charles W. Sawyer to Ambassador to Belgium he remarked "What could be more interesting, than the carrefour [crossroads] of Europe in the closing days of the war?" and during the late 1960s another well-respected envoy John S.D. Eisenhower, the son of President Dwight D. Eisenhower, served as ambassador to Belgium.

This is a complete list of United States ambassadors to Belgium:

== List of U.S. chiefs of mission to Belgium ==
=== Chargés d'affaires ===
- Hugh S. Legaré 1832–1836
- Virgil Maxcy 1837–1842
- Henry Washington Hilliard 1842–1844
- Thomas Green Clemson 1844–1851
- Richard H. Bayard 1851–1853
- John Jacob Seibels 1852–1854

=== Ministers resident ===
- John Jacob Seibels 1854–1856
- Elisha Y. Fair 1858–1861
- Henry Shelton Sanford 1861–1869
- Joseph Russell Jones 1869–1875
- Ayres Phillips Merrill 1876–1877
- William C. Goodloe 1878–1880
- James O. Putnam 1880–1882
- Nicholas Fish II 1882–1885
- Lambert Tree 1885–1888

=== Envoys extraordinary and ministers plenipotentiary ===
- Lambert Tree 1888
- John Gibson Parkhurst 1888–1889
- Edwin H. Terrell 1889–1893
- James Stevenson Ewing 1893–1897
- Bellamy Storer 1897–1899
- Lawrence Townsend 1899–1905
- Henry Lane Wilson 1905–1909
- Charles Page Bryan 1910–1911
- Larz Anderson 1911–1912
- Theodore Marburg 1912–1914
- Brand Whitlock 1914–1919

=== Ambassadors ===
- Brand Whitlock 1919–1921
- Henry P. Fletcher 1922–1924
- William Phillips 1924–1927
- Hugh S. Gibson 1927–1933
- Dave Hennen Morris 1933–1937
- Hugh S. Gibson 1937–1938
- Joseph E. Davies 1938–1939
- John Cudahy 1940
- Anthony Joseph Drexel Biddle Jr. 1941–1943
- Charles W. Sawyer 1944–1945
- Alan Goodrich Kirk 1946–1949
- Robert Daniel Murphy 1949–1952
- Myron Melvin Cowen 1952–1953
- Frederick M. Alger Jr. 1953–1957
- John Clifford Folger 1957–1959
- William A. M. Burden 1959–1961
- Douglas MacArthur II 1961–1965
- Ridgway B. Knight 1965–1969
- John S. D. Eisenhower 1969–1971
- Robert Strausz-Hupé 1972–1974
- Leonard Firestone 1974–1977
- Anne Cox Chambers 1977–1981
- Charles H. Price II 1981–1983
- Geoffrey Swaebe 1983–1988
- Maynard W. Glitman 1988–1991
- Bruce Gelb 1991–1993
- Alan Blinken 1993–1997
- Paul L. Cejas 1997–2001
- Stephen Brauer 2001–2003
- Tom C. Korologos 2004–2007
- Sam Fox 2007–2009
- Wayne Bush 2009 (Acting)
- Howard W. Gutman 2009–2013
- Denise Campbell Bauer 2013–2017
- Ronald Gidwitz 2018–2021
- Nicholas Berliner 2021–2022 (Acting)
- Michael M. Adler 2022–2025
- Bill White 2025-

== See also ==
- Belgium – United States relations
- Foreign relations of Belgium
- Ambassadors of the United States
- List of Belgian ambassadors to the United States
- United States Ambassador to the European Union - also based in Brussels
