= Bill White (administrator) =

American diplomat (born 1966 or 1967)

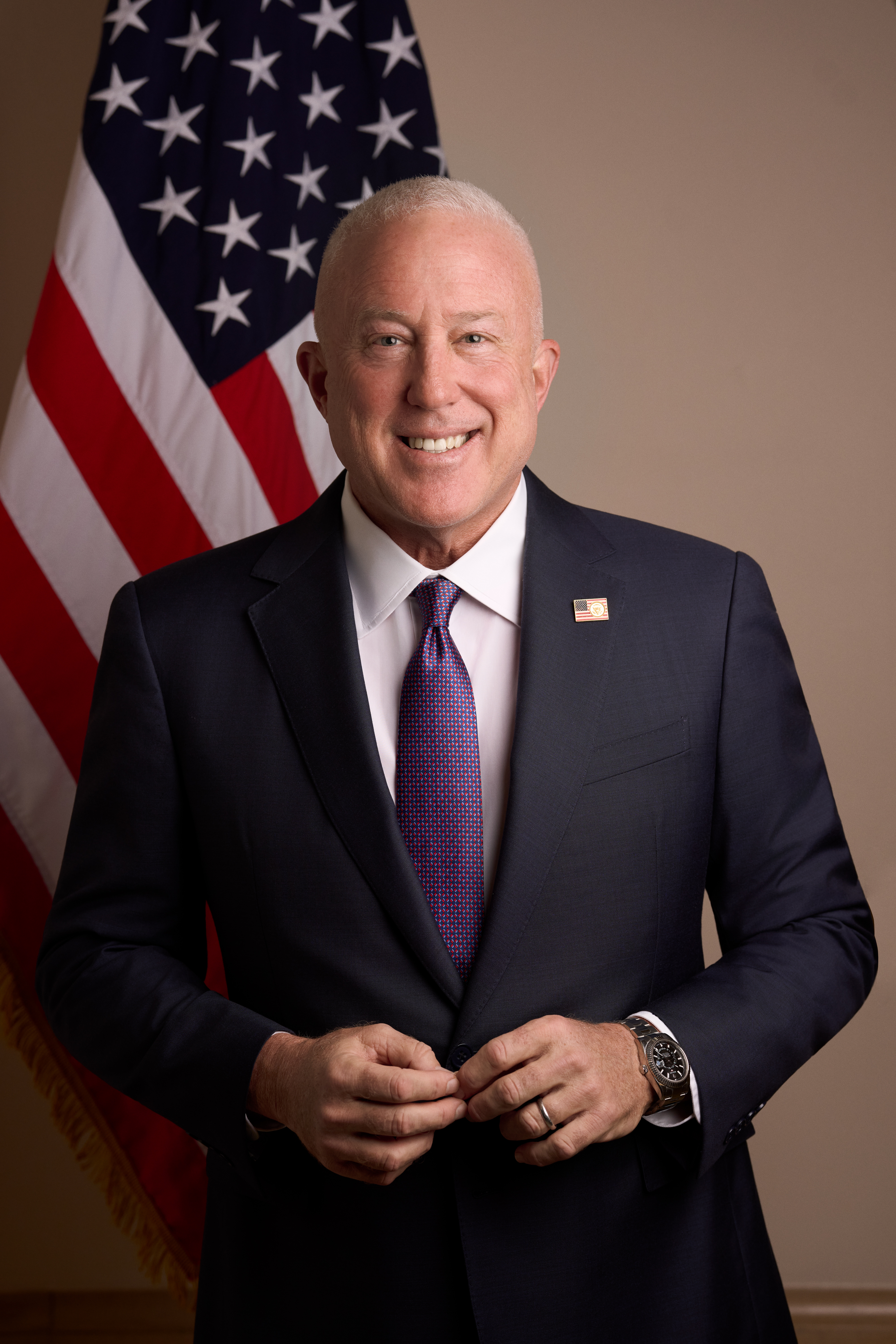
- Official portrait, 2025

36th United States Ambassador to Belgium
- Incumbent
- Assumed office November 13, 2025
- President: Donald Trump
- Preceded by: Michael M. Adler

Personal details
- Born: 1966 or 1967 (age 58–59) Point Lookout, New York, U.S.
- Party: Republican
- Spouse: Bryan Eure (m. 2011)
- Education: Fordham University
- Known for: President of the Intrepid Sea-Air-Space Museum

William Bryan White (born 1966 or 1967) is an American diplomat who is the United States ambassador to Belgium since 2025. He is the former president of the Intrepid Sea-Air-Space Museum.

== Life ==
White was born between 1966 and 1967, is a native of Point Lookout, New York, and graduated from Fordham University. White worked in his family's business and began to work for Intrepid in 1992 and became chief of staff to Zachary Fisher and fundraiser for the Intrepid Museum Foundation. In 1996 he was awarded the Meritorious Public Service Award for his work for the United States Navy. He resides in Manhattan.

In 2008, White was mentioned as a possible nominee for United States Secretary of the Navy for the Obama administration. The post eventually went to former Mississippi governor and ambassador to Saudi Arabia, Ray Mabus.

In June 2009, The Washington Times reported White to be considered for Deputy Chief Management Officer for the United States Department of Defense, which would make him the highest-ranking openly gay person in the department.

White resigned from his position as president of the Intrepid museum and other Intrepid related positions in May 2010. The museum gave no explanations for White's abrupt resignation. White had been subpoenaed earlier by the office of then New York State Attorney-General Andrew Cuomo in connection with investigations into campaign fundraising solicitations from pension fund managers. He had been connected to former state comptroller Alan G. Hevesi who resigned after pleading guilty to a felony charge.

Before joining the Intrepid organization in 1992, White worked in his family’s restaurant and real estate businesses in New York City. While in college, he volunteered as an emergency medical technician in the Bronx, where he assisted in delivering two babies. He also volunteered as a firefighter and served as captain of a sightseeing boat in New York Harbor.

In September 2010, White agreed to pay a $1,000,000 fine to settle charges that he was involved in the state pension fund pay-to-play scandal.

On February 1, 2011, White was voted back onto the board of trustees of the Intrepid Fallen Heroes Fund.

On May 14, 2012, it was reported by CNN that White had withdrawn his support from Republican presidential candidate Mitt Romney over his stance on gay marriage days after President Obama had stated his full support for gay marriage. In a letter he wrote, White requested that Romney's campaign return his maximum contribution. White told CNN that while he did not support President Obama's fiscal policy, he would support him over Romney because he believed Romney would push for a constitutional amendment against gay marriage that would nullify his own marriage.

== Political fundraising ==
=== 2014 Fundraiser with President Obama ===
On October 7, 2014, President Barack Obama attended a $25,000 a seat fundraiser hosted in the home of Bryan Eure and White. Money was raised for Democratic candidates in the midterm elections. In attendance were Rosie O’Donnell, Aretha Franklin and Mark Wahlberg.

=== Support for President Trump after 2016 presidential election ===
After Donald Trump's election in 2016, White and his husband switched their political and donor activity to conservative causes, abandoning their previous support for Hillary Clinton and Barack Obama. The pair hosted a $5 million fundraiser for Trump in 2018. After the 2020 Presidential election, White helped raise funds for Trump's legal defense fund.

== U.S. ambassador in Belgium ==
After winning the presidential election in 2024, Trump announced he was nominating White for United States Ambassador to Belgium.

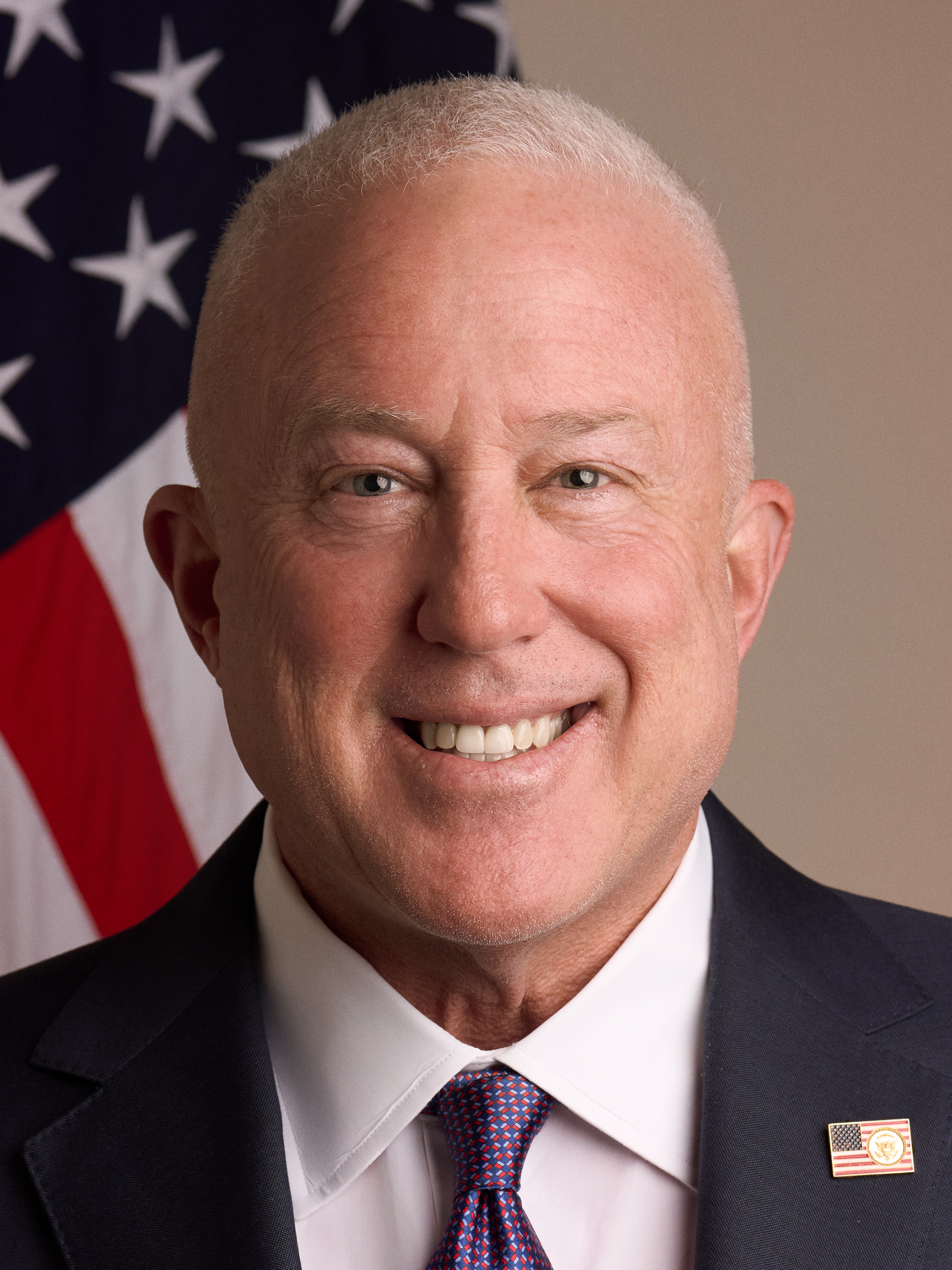
White in 2025

At a July 22, 2025, hearing before the U.S. Senate Foreign Relations Committee, Senator Tim Kaine asked White about a social media post a year earlier in which White had called for prosecuting Georgia Governor Brian Kemp and Georgia Secretary of State Brad Raffensperger: "It's high time now to legitimately prosecute @GaSecofState and @GovKemp !!" White answered by claiming there had been "substantial irregularities" in Georgia's 2020 election.

His nomination stalled in the Senate amid pushback from Democrats, but the committee advanced White's nomination on September 17, 2025. During his confirmation hearing, Kaine said he believed that some of White's posts on social media made him unfit for a diplomatic position. The posts underlined by Kaine included promoting conspiracies about the 2020 presidential election and support for Dries Van Langenhove, a far-right Belgian activist convicted of racism and Holocaust denial.

He was confirmed by the full Senate on October 7, 2025.

As ambassador, White championed a transactional approach to diplomacy, heavily emphasizing U.S.–Belgium commercial deals, including a joint production between Liège-based FN Browning and Raytheon to manufacture components for AMRAAM missiles, as well as pushing for Belgium to utilize U.S. liquefied natural gas and Westinghouse nuclear technology. He frequently defended Donald Trump's confrontational approach to European allies as "tough love."

In February 2026, he criticized the Belgian Minister of Health directly because of the prosecution of three Jewish circumcisers by an Antwerp judge and asked Belgium to "DROP THE RIDICULOUS AND ANTI SEMITIC ‘PROSECUTION’ NOW...". There is since 2023 a judicial investigation in Antwerp into illegal ritual circumcisions, considered as a medical procedure, carried out by individuals without any medical training. White publicly criticized Health Minister Frank Vandenbroucke, warned that political inaction would "be perceived as antisemitic", and engaged in a public dispute with the Flemish socialist leader, Conner Rousseau, suggesting Rousseau could face a ban from entering the United States. The investigation started after the television series Shalom allemaal showed the ritual and after complaints from Moshe Friedman, an Antwerp Jew who disagrees with the specific Antwerp tradition of not using (Jewish) doctors for the circumcision, and with the hygienic conditions of oral suction, and a complaint from the action group Rights And Freedoms Always (RAFA).

== Personal life ==
White married Bryan Eure in 2011, with prominent attorney David Boies officiating. In attendance were Barbara Walters, David Paterson, Gayle King, and Joel Grey, among other celebrities. Aretha Franklin sang at the wedding.

White splits his time between Atlanta and New York City.

In 2012, White purchased a townhouse in Manhattan at 460 West 22nd Street for $4.6 million and subsequently flipped it for $16 million after extensive renovations. The renovated property had been visited by Barack Obama, Jennifer Lopez and Mark Wahlberg before it was bought by DRGB Y Asociados LLC.

Diplomatic posts
Preceded by Michael M. Adler	United States Ambassador to Belgium; 2025–present	Incumbent
