= Tom C. Korologos =

American diplomat (1933–2024)

Tom Korologos
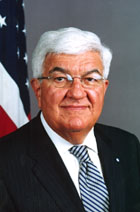

United States Ambassador to Belgium
- In office July 14, 2004 – February 6, 2007
- President: George W. Bush
- Preceded by: Stephen Brauer
- Succeeded by: Sam Fox

Personal details
- Born: Tom Chris Korologos; April 6, 1933 Salt Lake City, Utah, U.S.
- Died: July 26, 2024 (aged 91) Washington, D.C., U.S.
- Party: Republican
- Spouses: Joy Goff (died 1997); Ann Dore McLaughlin (m. 2000; died 2023)
- Children: 3, including Paula Cale
- Education: University of Utah (BA); Columbia University (MS)

Tom Chris Korologos (April 6, 1933 – July 26, 2024) was an American lobbyist, political advisor, and diplomat who served as the United States ambassador to Belgium.

== Early life, education ==
A second generation Greek American, Korologos was born in Salt Lake City, Utah, in 1933. He had family origins from Tyros, Arcadia, in Greece. His parents, Chris T. Korologos and Irene M. Kolendrianos, are both immigrants from Arcadia, which is located in the Peloponnese region. They owned a tavern.

Korologos started out as a journalist with The Salt Lake Tribune. Later he worked for the New York Herald Tribune, the Long Island Press, and the Associated Press. He was a U.S. Air Force officer from 1956 to 1957. He earned his B.A. degree at the University of Utah in 1956, and a M.S. degree from the Columbia University Graduate School of Journalism in 1958 where he received the Grantland Rice Fellowship and a Pulitzer Traveling Fellowship.

== Political career ==
From 1962 to 1971 Korologos worked for U.S. senator Wallace F. Bennett of Utah. He served in the Richard Nixon and Gerald Ford presidential administrations from 1971 to 1975, and worked closely with presidents Ronald Reagan, George H. W. Bush, and George W. Bush. He was co-founder of Timmons & Company, a Washington, D.C. lobbying firm. He was involved in more than 300 U.S. Senate confirmations including assisting Vice President Nelson Rockefeller, Vice President Gerald Ford, Supreme Court justices: William Rehnquist, Antonin Scalia, and nominee Robert Bork, as well as several cabinet secretaries, including: Henry Kissinger, Alexander Haig, and Donald Rumsfeld. He served as a chief sherpa for numerous nominations.

Korologos had a wide and varied Washington, D.C., experience. He served as a senior staff member in the U.S. Congress, as an assistant to two presidents in the White House, was a prominent businessman, and most recently was a senior counselor with the Coalition Provisional Authority (CPA) in Baghdad. In addition, he was a long-time member of the U.S. Advisory Commission on Public Diplomacy and a charter member of the Broadcasting Board of Governors that has jurisdiction over all non-military U.S. government radio and TV broadcasting overseas. He was a strategic advisor at DLA Piper in Washington, D.C.

== Board memberships ==
- The Choral Arts Society of Washington
- Meridian International Center
- The National Security Agency advisory board
- The Aspen Institute/Rockefeller Foundation Commission on Reform of the Appointment Process
- Layalina Broadcasting

== Personal life and death ==
Korologos was married to Joy Goff Korologos, who died from melanoma in 1997. The couple had three children, Paula, Ann, and Philip. Paula, one of their daughters, is an actress who goes professionally by Paula Cale. Korologos remarried to art collector Ann McLaughlin Korologos, who was United States Secretary of Labor in the Ronald Reagan administration and who served on the boards of several major companies. Korologos was also a professional photographer who showcased his work at his second wife Ann's gallery in Basalt, Colorado.

Tom C. Korologos died at his home in Washington, D.C., on July 26, 2024, at the age of 91.

== See also ==
- United States Ambassador to Belgium
- Foreign relations of Belgium

Diplomatic posts
Preceded by Stephen Brauer	United States Ambassador to Belgium; 2004–2007	Succeeded by Sam Fox
