= Stephen F. Brauer =

Former U.S. Ambassador to Belgium (born 1945)

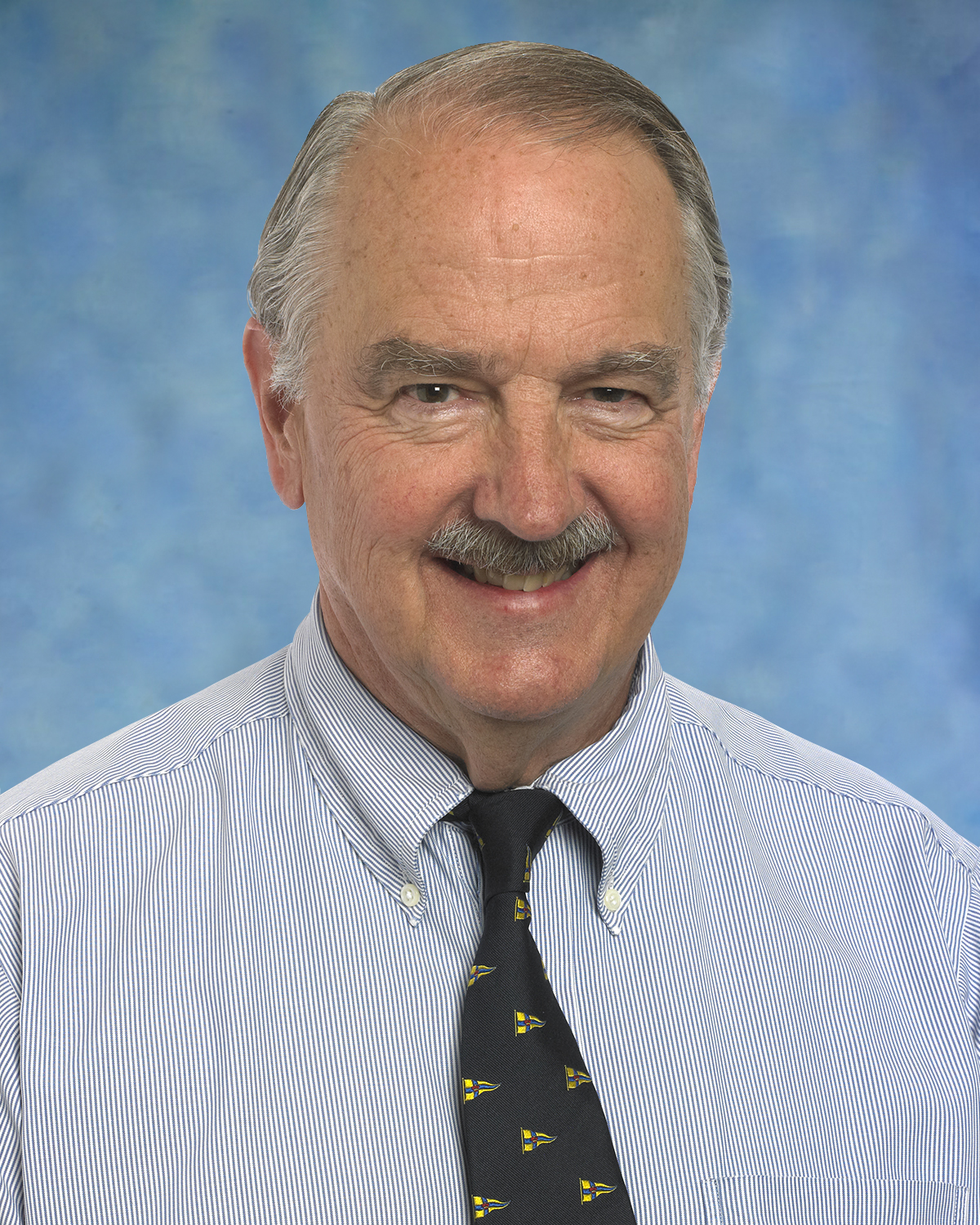

United States Ambassador to Belgium
- In office May 2, 2001 – October 23, 2003
- President: George W. Bush
- Preceded by: Paul L. Cejas
- Succeeded by: Tom C. Korologos

Personal details
- Born: September 3, 1945 (age 80) St. Louis, Missouri, U.S.
- Party: Republican
- Spouse: Camilla Thompson (m. 1971)
- Children: Blackford (Beau) Brauer Rebecca Brauer Stephen, Jr. Brauer
- Relatives: Jane Brauer (Mother) Arthur J. Brauer (Father) Lee Hunter (Stepfather)
- Education: Washington and Lee University; Westminster College

Stephen F. Brauer (born September 3, 1945) is an American businessman, philanthropist, and former U.S. Ambassador to Belgium (2001–2003). Brauer is currently chairman of Hunter Engineering Company, a manufacturer of automotive service equipment and technology that is headquartered in St. Louis, Missouri.

== Life ==
Born in St. Louis, Brauer attended St. Louis Country Day School, attended Washington and Lee University, and graduated from Westminster College, where he received a B.A. in economics in 1967. He served as 1st Lt. in the United States Army Corps of Engineers from 1968 to 1970, including a year tour in Vietnam. Brauer also served as Civilian Aide to the Secretary of the Army from 1991 to 1994. He began his career with Hunter Engineering Company in 1971, later becoming the chief operating officer in 1978 and chief executive officer in 1980. In May 2001, Brauer was confirmed by the U.S. Senate, and on June 1, 2001, he was sworn in as U.S. Ambassador to Belgium. He returned to the U.S. in September 2003 to resume his duties as CEO of Hunter Engineering Company.

== Charity ==
Brauer has been actively involved in philanthropic and civic endeavors, serving on several boards including the St. Louis Area Council of Boy Scouts, St. Louis Country Day School, St. Louis Art Museum, and the Missouri Botanical Garden, where he held the position of board president in the past. Since 1991, he has been a trustee of Washington University in St. Louis, assuming the role of board chair from 2009 to 2014. Notably, Brauer's philanthropic contributions include a significant lead gift for the construction of the Brauer Hall, situated on the engineering school campus, in 2008. Additionally, he has held positions on the national board of the Smithsonian Institution, the Missouri 21st Judicial District Commission, and has served as a director for notable entities such as Boatmen's Trust Company, the Private Client Board of Bank of America, and Ameren Corporation (NYSE:AEE).
