= Paul L. Cejas =

American diplomat (born 1943)

United States Ambassador to Belgium
- In office June 29, 1998 – January 31, 2001
- President: Bill Clinton
- Preceded by: Alan Blinken
- Succeeded by: Stephen Brauer

Personal details
- Born: January 4, 1943 (age 83) Havana, Cuba
- Education: University of Miami
- Profession: Diplomat; accountant; executive

Paul L. Cejas (born January 4, 1943) is a Cuban-born American businessman and former diplomat.

A native of Cuba who arrived in Miami, Florida in 1960, he is chairman and chief executive officer of PLC Investments, Inc., a wholly owned company that manages portfolio investments, and investments in real estate, health care and venture capital projects. He served as Ambassador to Belgium under U.S. President Bill Clinton. Cejas was founder, chairman and chief executive officer of CareFlorida Health Systems, Inc., the country's largest Hispanic-owned health care company, which merged with Foundation Health of California in 1994.

== Life ==
Cejas was born in Havana on January 4, 1943. A graduate of the University of Miami, Cejas earlier this year was listed among the "100 most powerful people in southern Florida" by South Florida CEO magazine.

A retired certified public accountant, Cejas is a former member of the American Institute of Certified Public Accountants and the Florida Institute of Certified Public Accountants. He has been extensively involved in community and public service.

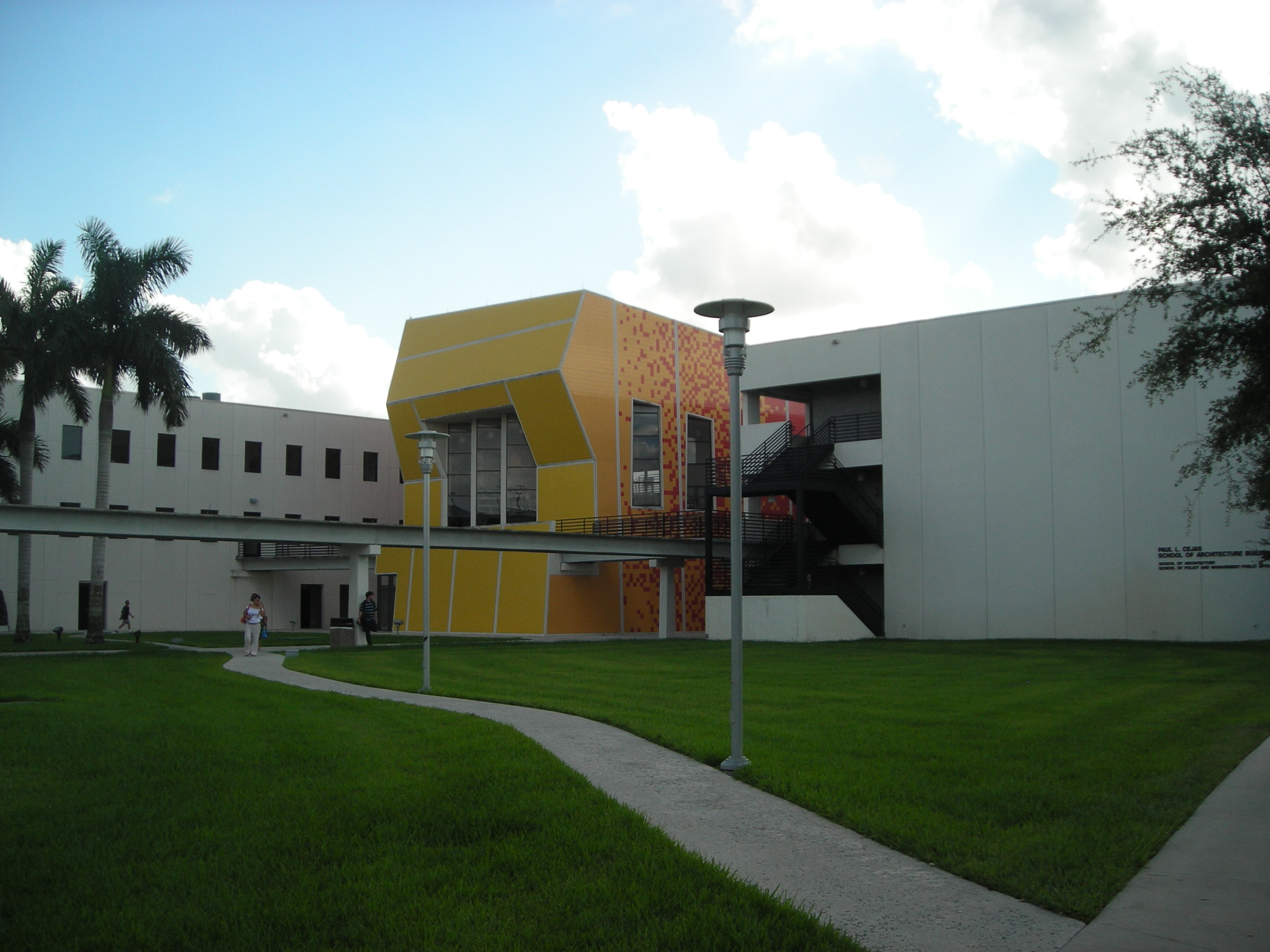
Paul Cejas School of Architecture Building at Florida International University.

He serves on the University of Miami Board of Trustees, the Smithsonian Institution's national board and the Latin American Advisory Board of the Tate Museum in London.

His previous public service includes being chairman of the Miami-Dade County School Board, a member of the Board of Regents of the Florida State University System, chairman of the Florida Partnership of the Americas, director of the Miami Art Museum of Dade County, and trustee of Florida International University, where the School of Architecture building is named in his honor.

== DNC criticism ==
In March 2008, Cejas, a top fundraiser for Hillary Clinton, criticized the Democratic Party's National Committee after the committee penalized Michigan and Florida for holding their primaries early in violation of national party rules, barring their delegates from being seated at the Democratic convention the following summer. Cejas was quoted in The New York Times as saying, "If you’re not going to count my vote, I’m not going to give you my money," referring to his 2007 contribution of $28,500. Many feel Cejas should hold the Florida legislature more accountable rather than the Democratic National Committee.

Diplomatic posts
Preceded by Alan Blinken	United States Ambassador to Belgium; 1998–2001	Succeeded by Stephen Brauer
