= Paula Cale =

American actress (born 1970)

- Born: Paula Korologos; June 2, 1970 (age 56); Great Falls, Virginia, U.S.
- Education: Vanderbilt University; DePaul University (BFA)
- Occupation: Actress
- Years active: 1990–present
- Spouse(s): Bennett Cale (m. 1995; div. 1999) Michael Lisbe (m. 2006)
- Relatives: Tom C. Korologos (father); Ann McLaughlin (stepparent)

Paula Korologos (born June 2, 1970), known professionally as Paula Cale, is an American actress best known for her role as Joanie Hansen on the television series Providence.

== Early life ==
Cale's father, Tom C. Korologos, worked as a top Capitol Hill lobbyist; a Congressional liaison during the Nixon and Ford presidential administrations; and managed the confirmation of Donald Rumsfeld as Secretary of Defense under George W. Bush. From 2004 to 2007, he served as the US Ambassador to Belgium. Cale's mother, Joy, was a homemaker and chairwoman of the Fairfax County, Virginia School Board, who died in 1997 from brain cancer.

Cale attended Langley High School and interned in the Ronald Reagan-era White House. Following her graduation in 1988, she studied to be a teacher for one year at Vanderbilt University in Nashville, Tennessee, then transferred to The Theatre School at DePaul University in Chicago, where she won a scholarship to study drama and earned a Bachelor of Fine Arts degree in acting in 1993.

== Career ==
Following college, Cale originated the role of Suzanne in the Steppenwolf Theatre production of Steve Martin's Picasso at the Lapin Agile in Chicago and came to Los Angeles with the production in 1995, where Candice Bergen spotted Cale and offered her the recurring role of McGovern, a reporter in Murphy Brown. Soon after, Cale was simultaneously appearing in two comedy series on different networks: as a sassy waitress in Local Heroes and as the neurotic wife of Christopher Gartin in Buddies.

She then went to New York City to appear onstage, including The Night of the Iguana on Broadway and as Gilda Radner in off-Broadway's Bunny, Bunny. When she returned to Los Angeles, she guest-starred in two episodes of NBC's The Naked Truth as Téa Leoni's sister, and on Cybill as Cybill Sheridan's long-lost niece. Wanting to continue comedic roles, she first hesitated when asked to audition for the drama Providence.

After Providence ended in 2002, Cale appeared as Dean Martin's first wife Betty in Martin and Lewis, and in the 2008 TV movie Living Proof on Lifetime. In 2014, she appeared alongside Jennifer Aniston in Cake as Carol.

== Personal life ==
From 1995 to 1999, she was married to folk musician Bennett Cale. In 2002, she revealed to People Magazine that she has clinical depression. On July 29, 2006, she married Los Angeles screenwriter Michael Lisbe. Cale currently resides in Los Angeles, where she performs volunteer work for her church.
