= Patrick Hennessy (painter) =

Irish artist (1915–1980)

- Self Portrait and Cat, 1978
- Born: 28 August 1915; Cork, Ireland
- Died: 30 December 1980 (aged 65); London, UK
- Education: Dundee School of Art
- Known for: Still Life, Landscape and trompe l'oeil paintings
- Movement: Realism

Patrick Anthony Hennessy RHA (28 August 1915 – 30 December 1980) was an Irish realist painter. He was known for his highly finished still lifes, landscapes and trompe l'oeil paintings. The hallmark of his style was his carefully observed realism and his highly finished surfaces, the result of a virtuoso painting technique. He was brought up in Arbroath by his mother and step-father, his father having been killed during World War One. He attended Dundee School of Art where he met his lifelong companion, the painter Henry (Harry) Robertson Craig. Two of his paintings were accepted in 1939 at the Royal Scottish Academy for their Annual Exhibition. For the next 29 years he lived in Ireland with extended trips abroad. He was elected a member of the Royal Hibernian Academy in 1949. The Hendriks Gallery in Dublin and the Guildhall Galleries in Chicago were the main outlets for his work. In the late 1960s he moved permanently to Tangier and then, after suffering ill health, to the Algarve. He died in London.

== Life and work ==
=== Early life in Ireland ===
Patrick Hennessy was born in Cork, Ireland, in 1915. The son of John Hennessy an army sergeant major (Leinster Regiment) from County Kerry and Bridget Hennessy from Cork. John Hennessy was killed at the battle of Passchendaele in 1917. In 1921 when Patrick was five years old his mother Bridget remarried in Cork. Her second husband was a Scot named John Duncan and shortly afterwards the whole family moved to Arbroath, Scotland where Duncan had relatives.

=== Life in Scotland ===
Patrick Hennessy was educated in Arbroath at St Thomas RC Primary School followed by secondary education at Arbroath High School (1927–1933), where he began to show an aptitude for art leaving in 1933 with the Dux for Art and an accompanying medal. In the autumn of that year he enrolled at the Dundee School of Art, for a four-year Diploma course in Drawing and Painting under James McIntosh Patrick RSA and Edward Baird. The family's decision to support the young Hennessy in his artistic ambition was not taken lightly. They were not well off. Here he met Harry Robertson Craig who would become his lifelong companion. Hennessy played a full part in the social activities of the college, winning a fancy dress award at the Christmas revels in 1935 and producing a ballet "Paradise Lost" the following year. He gained a First Class Pass in each year of the course along with winning first prize in 1934 and 1936 for work done during the summer vacation. He graduated with a First Class Distinction in 1937. Having gained a scholarship he continued his studies there for a further year by doing a Post-Graduate Diploma course in Drawing and Painting. He also helped out his old high school by painting the background scenery at their concert. Within a month of gaining his Post-Graduate Diploma he held his first joint exhibition at the Art Galleries in Arbroath. In June 1938 he was awarded the Annual Travelling Scholarship for further studies in Paris and Italy. In Paris he met up with the artists Robert Colquhoun and Robert MacBryde whom he had met the previous year, the three travelling south together to Marseilles towards the end of that year. On his return to Scotland he was selected for the residential summer school course at Hospitalfield House near Arbroath under James Cowie. Hennessy voiced some criticism of the Principal of Dundee College of Art for not recruiting locally. Two of his paintings, a still life and a self-portrait, were accepted that year by the Royal Scottish Academy for their Annual Exhibition. However, by the autumn of 1939 with war looming and feeling somewhat disenchanted on his return to Scotland after his travels abroad as well as an unhappy experience at Hospitalfield House he decided to leave Scotland and return to Ireland. James McIntosh Patrick when asked fifty years later if he remembered his pupil Hennessy, replied, I can recall him only because he was outstanding.

=== Life in Ireland ===
On arrival in Dublin, the twenty four year old Hennessy was offered an exhibition in December 1939 at the Country Shop on St Stephens Green which was opened by Mainie Jellett. This attracted favourable attention. During the early forties he lived at various addresses in and around Dublin city with frequent trips to Cork. In 1940 he was invited to join the Society of Dublin Painters and held regular annual exhibitions of his work there during the forties and early fifties. These exhibitions were supplemented by an eclectic mix of commissions, mostly portraits which he undertook during this period. In 1941 Hennessy had three of his paintings accepted by the Royal Hibernian Academy, RHA, for their annual exhibition. This was the beginning of a long relationship with the RHA. He exhibited there virtually every year from 1941 until 1979 the year before his death. During the late 1940s, Hennessy undertook a portrait of Francis Bacon, which remains unfinished, but which also serves to link Hennessy to the artistic social network connected with Bacon, including Lucian Freud, John Craxton, Peter Watson, Edward James, Salvador Dalí, and Cyril Connolly. From the early 1940s onwards, Hennessy's work sometimes incorporated a homosexual visual subtext. He re-united with Harry Robertson Craig in 1946 and soon after they moved to Crosshaven County Cork and later to Cobh County Cork. In 1947, Time magazine selected Hennessy as one of Irelands outstanding painters, in recognition of the important position he had then attained in the art world. In 1948 he had an exhibition at the Victor Waddington Gallery, Dublin and that same year was elected an associate of the Royal Hibernian Academy and a full member the following year. In 1950 his painting De Profundis was selected for the Contemporary Irish Painting exhibition that toured North America. As a result of this tour, the American public and critics began to take notice of his work. In 1951 the Dublin Painters Society held a Retrospective Exhibition of his work covering the period 1941 to 1951. Also in 1951 Hennessy visited Italy taking in Venice and Sicily and returning to Dublin with many of his canvases painted abroad. One of these paintings Bronze Horses of St. Marks was exhibited at the Royal Academy London in 1954. Hennessy spent a lot of his summer months during this period on trips abroad to France, Italy, Greece and Spain.

In 1956 David Hendriks, a friend of Hennessy, opened the Ritchie Hendriks Gallery on St Stephens Green, Dublin and it was this gallery that was to be the main outlet for Hennessy's work over the following 22 years. In October 1956 the Thomas Agnew Gallery in London held an exhibition of his work comprising 38 of his paintings. However, during the winter of 1959 Hennessy became seriously ill with pneumonia. As a consequence of this, in the autumn of that year he and Craig decided to winter in Morocco. This was the beginning of a new era in both their lives. They would never again spend a full year in Ireland. Initially they would return after each winter but as the years passed the absences grew longer and longer. Hennessy's exhibitions at the Ritchie Hendriks gallery had for many years enjoyed favourable reviews from the art critics but in the 1960s this changed. Some critics claimed his paintings failed to communicate any genuine "personal" vision and criticised his use of ugly colour. Others found them to be dull, repetitive and suggested the artist needed to explore new areas. This criticism became quite savage on occasion with adjectives such as "stale" and "cold" being used to describe his work. One critic wrote that Hennessy deserves admiration of a sort for ploughing such a lonely furrow and that he is one of the true outsiders of latter day Irish painting. He does concede though that his admirers are not likely to worry by this criticism. Stating they are a faithful band, none more faithful, who have followed him for at least two decades and no matter what reviews he gets the man seems to sell Despite this barrage of criticism, in 1965 the Guildhall Gallery Chicago, to whom he had been sending a small number of paintings for years, offered him a major exhibition. Shortly after this exhibition which took place in 1966 he became one of the artists on permanent display at the gallery with an annual exhibition. The North American market was extremely lucrative for Hennessy and by the end of the decade he was selling more of his work in the US than in Ireland. In 1968 Hennessy finally moved to Tangier, Morocco on a permanent basis and in 1970 sold his studio on Raglan Lane Dublin to his doctor.

=== Later life ===
In Morocco, Hennessy painted prolifically for nine years to keep up with demand from the Hendriks Gallery and Guildhall Gallery along with the RHA. In 1975 the Guildhall Gallery mounted a highly successful Retrospective of his work. In 1978 Hennessy had his last exhibition in Dublin at the Hendriks Gallery. By now he had moved to the Algarve, Portugal and was beginning to have health problems. He had very little contact with Ireland at this stage and was never to see Hendriks again.

In November 1980 with his health deteriorating, Craig brought him to a hospital in London for treatment. However, on 30 December 1980 he died from cancer. Following cremation his ashes were buried in nearby Golders Green Crematorium. David Hendriks who knew Hennessy for over twenty years commented, "I really knew very little about him - he was so non-committal" adding "he wasn't fashionable: wasn't in the mainstream - and he refused to change."

=== Legacy ===
Hennessy left his entire estate to Harry Robertson Craig with agreement that on Craig's death the Royal Hibernian Academy should be the beneficiary. This legacy has been used to set up the biennial Hennessy Craig Award for aspiring artists.

== Artistic style ==
Patrick Hennessy falls into the category of painter who developed a distinctive personal style. Labelled at various times in his life as a Traditional Realist, Photo Realist, Illusionary and Surrealist. However, he always remained intrinsically himself. His subjects ranged from still life and interiors to landscapes and portraits.

Examples of his work can be found in the public collections of the Crawford Art Gallery; the Dublin City Gallery The Hugh Lane; the Irish Museum of Modern Art (IMMA); the Limerick City Gallery of Art (LCGA); the National Gallery of Ireland (NGI); the National Self-Portrait Collection of Ireland (NSPCI) at the University of Limerick (UL); and in the collections of University College Cork (UCC) and University College Dublin (UCD).

== Selected exhibitions ==
- Group Exhibition; Patrick Hennessy and William P. Vannett Exhibition, Arbroath Art Gallery, Scotland, July 1939(opened by Sir Harry Hope M.P.)
- Solo Exhibition; The Country Shop Gallery Dublin, 12 December 1939(opened by Mainie Jellett)
- Solo Exhibition; Dublin Painters Gallery, 7 St. Stephens Green(21 paintings) 1943
- Solo Exhibition; Victor Waddington Gallery, South Anne St. Dublin, 18–29 November 1948
- Solo Exhibition: Dublin Painters Gallery Dublin, 1951
- Solo Exhibition; Exhibition of Recent Paintings by Patrick Hennessy RHA, Thos.Agnew & Sons Ltd London, 10 October - 3 November 1956
- Solo Exhibition; Paintings by Patrick Hennessy RHA, The Ritchie Hendriks Gallery Dublin, 1–30 November 1957
- Solo Exhibition; Patrick Hennessy Exhibition, Guildhall Galleries ltd Chicago, 1966
- Group Exhibition: Irish Art 1900–1950: Rosc Exhibition (curated by Hilary Pyle), Crawford Art Gallery Cork, 1975/6
- Solo Exhibition; Ten Year Retrospective Exhibition, Guildhall Galleries Ltd Chicago, 1975
- Solo Exhibition; Paintings by Patrick Hennessy RHA, The David Hendriks Gallery Dublin, 10 November - 2 December 1978
- Group Exhibition: Catching a Likeness – Portraits on Paper National Gallery of Ireland (NGI) Dublin, 3 September – 9 December 2007
- Group Exhibition: Hero With a Thousand Faces, Crawford Art Gallery Cork, 6 March – 30 May 2009
- Associated Exhibition: Connolly/Cleary: Still life with..., City Gallery of Art (LCGA) Limerick, 3 June 2010
- Group Exhibition: The Politics of Memory (curated by Shane Cullen), Crawford Art Gallery Cork, 20 November 2010 – Mid-2011
- Group Exhibition: The Language of Dreams (curated by Peter Murray), Crawford Art Gallery Cork, 2 October 2015 – 6 February 2016
- Solo Exhibition; De Profundis (curated by Sean Kissane), Irish Museum of Modern Art, Dublin, 24 March 2016 – 24 July 2016

== Selected works ==
- Self-Portrait, National Self-Portrait Gallery of Ireland (NSPCI), University of Limerick, Ireland
- Portrait of Liv Hempel (1939)
- Old Kinsale (c.1940), Crawford Art Gallery, Cork, Ireland
- Exiles (1943), Dublin City Gallery The Hugh Lane, Dublin, Ireland
- Portrait of Elizabeth Bowen at Bowen's Court (1957), Crawford Art Gallery, Cork, Ireland
- Bird Still Life (1973), University College Cork, Ireland
- Self-Portrait and Cat (1978), Crawford Art Gallery, Cork, Ireland
