= Michael Kessler (artist) =

American artist (born 1954)

- Born: October 23, 1954 (age 72)
- Occupation: Artist
- Website: michaelkessler.com

Michael Kessler (born October 23, 1954) is an American artist.

== Art ==
Kessler makes nature-based paintings that merge geometric elements with biomorphism. He began his art career as a landscape painter. While still an undergraduate at Kutztown University Kessler received a fellowship from the Whitney Museum of American Art to study and produce art in New York City at the Whitney Independent Study Program. During this period (1977–78) he met many important artist working in New York City including Richard Tuttle and Dorothea Rockburne. Influenced by the paintings of Brice Marden and Elizabeth Murray as well as the music of Philip Glass and Steve Reich he began experimenting with his own work. His paintings soon became fully non-objective. Kessler's works are characterized by large fields of diaphanous color that are activated by organic linear structures that have been visually and physically woven into a grid structure which consists of thick slabs of paint. These organic linear structures are overlapped and punctuated by dendritic growth patterns that suggest the bending of time and space. All of these visual elements as well as the color combinations have been carefully extracted from nature over time through prolonged observation and then reconstructed and orchestrated to transmit the dynamics of the Natural World. In this way Kessler synthesizes disparate elements into a new kind of harmony.

In 1991 after returning from a year in Italy (via. the Rome Prize) Kessler became very involved with large-scale, site-specific installations. Gallery owner Chris Schmidt (Schmidt/Dean Gallery, Philadelphia) worked with Kessler to initiate this project by obtaining a commission from Arlen Specter for Kessler's first site-specific work which was installed in Senator Specter's office at the Hart Senate Office Building in Washington, D.C. In Chicago Kessler continued this pursuit with Gallery owner Paul Klein who also got involved with the placement of site-specific works in his gallery Klein Art Works.

== Education ==
Bachelor of Fine Arts degree from Kutztown University.

Kessler attended the Independent Study Program at the Whitney Museum of American Art

== Awards ==
- Winner of the Rome Prize, 1991
- Winner of the Pollock-Krasner Award, 1992, This is a grant for painting set up and administered by the Pollock/ Krasner Foundation.
- Winner of the "Awards in the Visual Arts-5" grant in painting, 1985
- Winner of the Pennsylvania Council on the Arts grant in painting, 1983

== Public collections ==
His paintings are held in 25 museum collections including:

- The Brooklyn Museum
- The Albright-Knox Art Gallery
- The Museum of Fine Arts in Boston
- The Broad Art Foundation in Los Angeles
- The New Museum in New York City

== Gallery exhibitions ==
Since 1983 his paintings have been shown in over two hundred exhibitions throughout the United States and Europe.

- Five solo shows at the Jack Tilton Gallery in New York City.
- Solo Exhibition at Ann Korologos Gallery in Basalt, Colorado (Gallery is owned by former Secretary of Labor, Ann Korologos).
- Gallery Bienvenu, New Orleans, Louisiana
- Madison Gallery, La Jolla, California
- Paia Contemporary Gallery, Maui, Hawaii
- Schmidt Dean Gallery, Philadelphia, Pennsylvania
- Lanoue Fine Art, Boston, Massachusetts
- Sense Fine Art, Menlo Park, California
- Allentown Art Museum, Allentown, Pennsylvania
- Castellani Art Museum, Niagara Falls, New York

== General references ==
- Video – A Painting in the Making on YouTube
- Inner Nature by Nancy Doll
- New Work, New York, Outside New York at the New Museum
- Geoform interview by Julie Karabenick
- Art News review by Richard Speer
