= Sam Fox =

American businessman and diplomat (1929–2024)

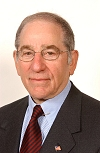
- Fox in 2007

31st United States Ambassador to Belgium
- In office April 11, 2007 – January 2, 2009
- President: George W. Bush
- Preceded by: Tom C. Korologos
- Succeeded by: Howard Gutman

Personal details
- Born: May 9, 1929 Desloge, Missouri, U.S.
- Died: December 2, 2024 (aged 95) St. Louis, Missouri, U.S.
- Education: Washington University in St. Louis

Sam Fox (May 9, 1929 – December 2, 2024) was an American businessman in St. Louis, and the owner of Harbour Group Industries. He was the United States Ambassador to Belgium from April 2007 to January 2009.

== Personal life ==
Fox was born in Desloge, Missouri, to Ukrainian Jewish immigrant Michel Fuks (later Max Fox), and Fanny Gold. Encouraged by an older sister to go to college, he saved money by working summers in Illinois canning peas and corn. He also sold Fuller Brushes. After moving in with his sister and her husband in St. Louis, he enrolled at Washington University in St. Louis, where he joined Sigma Alpha Mu fraternity. He graduated with a B.S.B.A. (Bachelor of Science, Business Administration) with honors in business in 1951. During the Korean War, he served in the United States Naval Reserve.

Fox died in St. Louis on December 2, 2024, at the age of 95.

== Career ==
In 1976, Fox founded the Harbour Group, an operating company that builds and acquires businesses where he was chairman and CEO until 2007 when he left to be the U.S. Ambassador to Belgium. Upon his return to the United States in 2009, he resumed his role as chairman. Since its inception, Harbour Group has built and acquired more than 176 companies in 37 industries.

== Civic participation and philanthropy ==
For more than 40 years, Fox was active in St. Louis civic affairs. He had two terms as chairman and one as president of the St. Louis Area's Boy Scouts of America Council. He was also former president of the board of commissioners of the Saint Louis Art Museum and was a lifetime member of the Art Museum's board of trustees. In 2003 he also was chair of the $63 million capital campaign of the United Way of Greater St. Louis. From 1998 to 2004 he was chairman of a $1.5 billion capital campaign for his alma mater, Washington University in St. Louis, and from 1999 to 2001 he was vice chairman of the board of trustees. In 2004 the university's board of trustees elected him a lifetime voting trustee. He was on the boards of the Barnes-Jewish Hospital, the Saint Louis Symphony Orchestra, the Saint Louis Science Center, the Saint Louis Zoo, the Opera Theatre of Saint Louis, the Arts and Education Council of St. Louis, the St. Louis Muny Opera, and Forest Park Forever. In 2003 he was named St. Louis Citizen of the Year by the Post-Dispatch and a committee of the award's former recipients.

Outside of St.Louis, Fox was on the boards of the Horatio Alger Association of Distinguished Americans, based in Alexandria, Virginia; the King Baudouin Foundation United States, a New York-based nonprofit that helps U.S. donors achieve their philanthropic goals in Europe and Africa; and The Washington Center, the largest independent, nonprofit academic internship program in the United States. In addition, through the Fox Family Foundation, a private philanthropy he and his wife established in 1986, Fox provided financial assistance to hundreds of charitable organizations in St. Louis and around the world.

Fox received numerous other honors and awards, including the Woodrow Wilson Award for Corporate Citizenship, the Marco Polo Award from the People's Republic of China, the Thomas Jefferson Award from the Missouri Historical Society, and the Sword of Ignatius Loyola Award from Saint Louis University. In 2004, Washington University dedicated its new Sam Fox School of Design & Visual Arts, and also awarded him an honorary doctorate of laws degree. Saint Louis University awarded Fox an honorary doctorate in 2000.

== Political participation ==
A major donor to the Republican Party, Fox was a Bush Pioneer in 2000 and a "Ranger" in 2004, categories for donors who recruit others to donate. On October 15, 2004, Fox donated $50,000 to Swift Boat Veterans For Truth ("SBVT"), a 527 group that opposed John Kerry in the 2004 presidential election by claiming that Kerry exaggerated his service record. The SBVT has, in turn, been criticized for allegedly failing to substantiate many of their claims.

In later elections, Fox supported the presidential candidacy of Mitt Romney and remained one of the most prominent Jewish donors to the Republican party. Fox was a past chairman of the Republican Jewish Coalition. President George W. Bush appointed Sam and Marilyn Fox to the Honorary Delegation to accompany him to Jerusalem for the celebration of the 60th anniversary of the State of Israel in May 2008.

Fox was an early supporter of Josh Hawley and contributed to his campaign for Missouri Attorney General. He encouraged Hawley to run for US Senate against incumbent Claire McCaskill. After Hawley's support of the 2021 storming of the United States Capitol, Fox released a statement describing Hawley's actions as "reckless pandering" and a "disgrace." In the statement Fox said that his support for Hawley was a mistake and that he would not support the senator again.

== Ambassadorial nomination ==
Fox was nominated for the position of Ambassador to Belgium in December 2006. During his February 2007 hearing before the Senate Foreign Relations Committee, Fox was supported by both of Missouri's senators, Republican Kit Bond and Democrat Claire McCaskill, as well as by two former U.S. Senators from Missouri, John C. Danforth (Rep.) and Thomas F. Eagleton (Dem.). Danforth described him as "very bright...ebullient...(and) a soft touch," while Eagleton, in a letter, called him "the epitome of a humanitarian." Fox faced lengthy questioning from John Kerry, the target of attacks by Swift Boat Veterans for Truth, a group to which Fox contributed in 2004. Kerry told Fox that he represented "the quintessential American Horatio Alger story" and that his experience was "impressive... (and) a lot more than some people bring to this table."

Kerry interrogated Fox for approximately 35 minutes, however, beginning with 20 minutes of questioning directly pertinent to the ambassadorial position for which Fox was nominated, such as the tensions over the U.S. Terrorist Finance Tracking Program which accessed transaction databases of the SWIFT network. Kerry continued with a series of questions related to Fox's financial support of SBVT, a 527 organization which had criticized Kerry's military record during the 2004 campaign. In response to the question from Kerry, "I assume that you believe the truth in public life is important," Fox answered, "Yes, sir." Kerry then followed with, "And might I ask you what your opinion is with respect to the state of American politics, as regards the politics of personal destruction?" to which Fox replied "I'm against 527s, I've always been against 527s....Senator Kerry, I very much respect your dedicated service to this country... Senator, you're a hero." In response to follow up questions from Kerry, Fox said he had given to the 527 that attacked him because "when we're asked we generally give." For example, he said, in the most recent two-year period, he had made more than 1,000 contributions, of which more than 100 were political. He did not express regret for his contribution to SBVT. He noted that 527s supporting both candidates in the electorate had made "mean and destructive" claims, and that a video posted on the MoveOn.com website has compared the President to Hitler. He said that as long as one side was making such claims, "politically it's necessary."

=== Recess Appointment ===
On April 4, 2007, while the Senate was in recess, Bush used his power of recess appointment to appoint Fox to the position. This made Fox ambassador until the end of the next session of Congress, and effectively made him ambassador for the remainder of the Bush presidency.

=== Reactions to the Recess Appointment ===
==== Senate / Democratic Reaction ====
Several Democratic Senators criticized Bush's decision to make a recess appointment when the nomination was no longer pending before Congress. They also argued that this use of the recess appointment power was illegal because of statutory restrictions applicable to ambassadorships.

Three Democratic senators wrote a letter to the Government Accountability Office on April 5, 2007, calling for an investigation of whether President Bush's appointment of Sam Fox as U.S. ambassador to Belgium the previous day was legal. The letter, submitted by Democrats Chris Dodd of Connecticut, John Kerry of Massachusetts and Robert Casey of Pennsylvania, read: "We view the recess appointment of Mr. Fox as a clear abuse of the President's recess appointment power." Dodd argued that the law that enables the president to make recess appointments was not created to get around the approval of the Senate. "This is really now taking the recess appointment vehicle and abusing this beyond anyone's imagination," Dodd said, according to AP. "This is a travesty." He said in a statement that what the President did was "deceptive at best and illegal at worst."

==== Administration / Republican Reaction ====
The GAO, however, responded with an eight-page letter dated June 8, 2007, that the appointment had been legal. Indeed, the letter said "an alternative interpretation that would preclude Mr. Fox from serving in a recess appointment would raise serious constitutional questions."

==== Ambassador ====
Fox was Ambassador from April 2007 to January 2009. In December 2009, the U.S. Department of State's Office Inspector General filed its official report on his tenure. The report noted that Fox had "come to his job with significant and relevant executive leadership in the private sector." It continued:

"By all accounts, he used his business acumen and experience to excellent effect, notably in two areas. The first was in building important relationships with both the Belgian and American business communities, and with senior Belgian Government officials charged with financial and trade matters. The second was his active and visible outreach to the Belgian community to improve the image and standing of the United States at a time when both were suffering as a result of Belgian misgivings about U.S. policies, such as the Iraq war. His efforts in both areas were judged highly successful."

The report gave Fox particularly high marks for "shepherding to production a 20-minute film that highlights the closeness of Belgian-U.S. ties from the early 19th century. The film continues to play well to Belgian audiences and has been employed effectively to counter anti-American sentiment."

In 2012, three years after his term as Ambassador had ended, Fox's contributions were recognized with the Grand Cross of the Order of the Crown, bestowed by King Albert II.
