= Henry Hunter Craig =

Alabama state representative

Henry Hunter Craig (died 1876) was an American grocer, barber and politician who represented Montgomery County, Alabama in the Alabama House of Representatives from 1870 to 1872.

Henry Hunter Craig was born enslaved in the state of Virginia, United States. Racially, he was classified as "mulatto". He was freed from slavery before the American Civil War. He later worked as a barber and owned a grocery store and bar.

Craig served as a body servant to General E. Y. Fair while the latter was United States Minister to Belgium. Later, he worked as a mail agent for the Montgomery and West Point Railroad. He was hired by revenue assessor James Thomas Rapier to work in his office in Montgomery, Alabama. During the 1867 Alabama constitutional convention he served as the meeting's doorkeeper. Craig served on the Montgomery City Council in 1868 and 1869 and represented Montgomery County in the Alabama House of Representatives from 1870 to 1872. He was also a member of the executive committee of the Alabama Negro Labor Union.

His name is listed along with other Alabama legislators who were African American and served during the Reconstruction era.

== See also ==
- African American officeholders from the end of the Civil War until before 1900

== Works cited ==
- Bailey, Richard (2010). Neither Carpetbaggers Nor Scalawags: Black Officeholders During the Reconstruction of Alabama, 1867-1878. NewSouth Books. ISBN 9781588381897 – via Google Books.
- Foner, Eric (1996). Freedom's Lawmakers. Louisiana State University Press.
- Kusmer, Kenneth L. (1991). The Civil War and Reconstruction Era, 1861–1877. Black Communities and Urban Development in America, 1720-1990. Vol. 3. Garland. ISBN 9780815304272.
- Owen, Thomas McAdory (1921). History of Alabama and Dictionary of Alabama Biography. Vol. 1. Chicago: S. J. Clarke Publishing Company.
