= Michael M. Adler =

American businessman and diplomat

Michael Adler
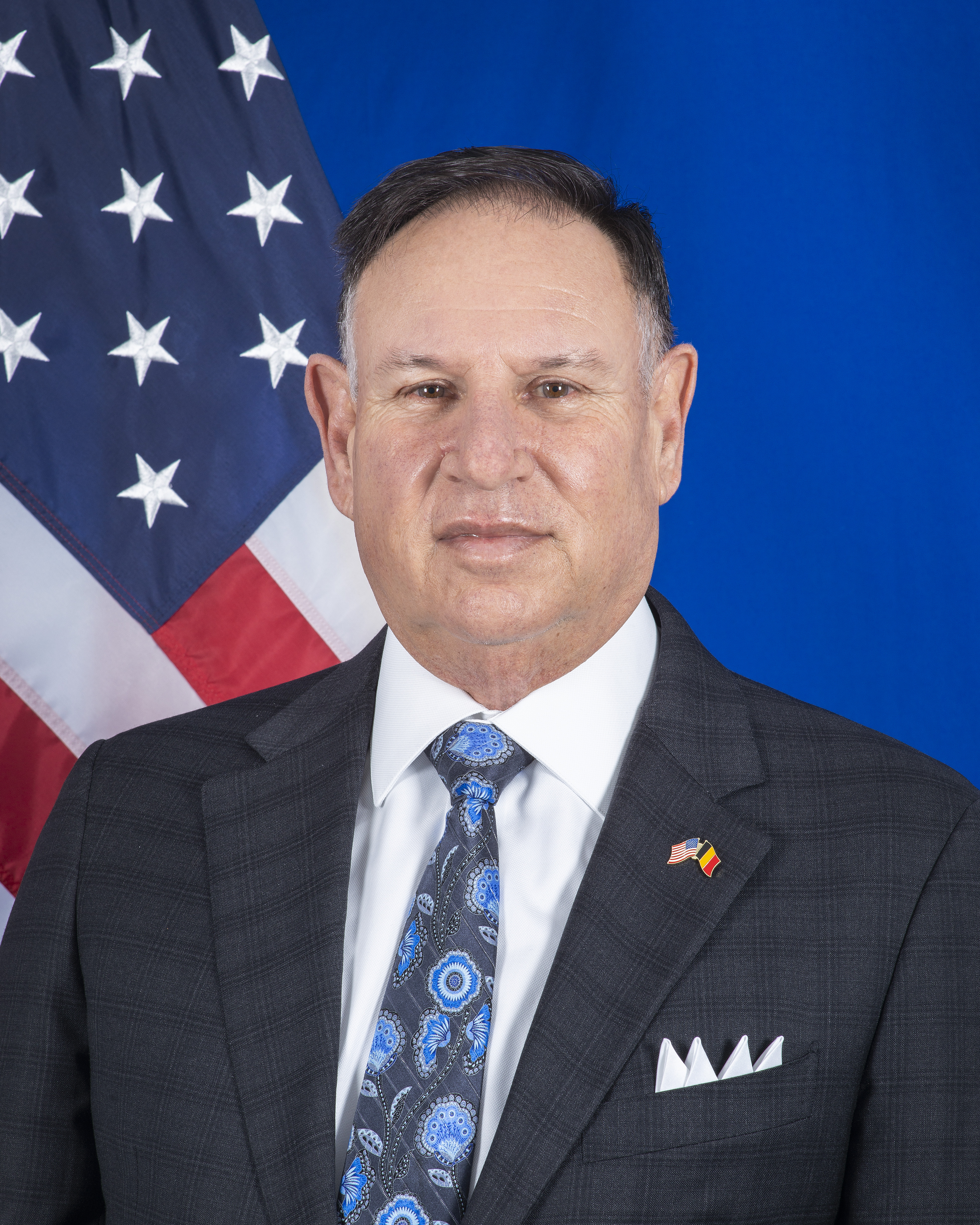
- official portrait, 2022

United States Ambassador to Belgium
- In office March 15, 2022 – January 15, 2025
- President: Joe Biden
- Preceded by: Ronald Gidwitz
- Succeeded by: Bill White

Personal details
- Party: Democratic
- Education: University of Miami (BBA)

Michael M. Adler is an American businessman who served as the United States ambassador to Belgium from 2022 to 2025.

== Education ==
Adler has a Bachelor of Business Administration from the University of Miami.

== Joe Biden campaign and administration ==
Adler met Joe Biden in 1973 when his sister, Karen, worked for Biden's U.S. Senate office. Adler served as Biden's national finance chair during his 2008 presidential campaign. Adler was a campaign surrogate during the 2020 election.

=== Ambassador to Belgium ===
In September 2021, President Biden nominated Adler to be the United States Ambassador to Belgium. Hearings on his nomination were held before the Senate Foreign Relations Committee on December 1, 2021. The committee favorably reported his nomination on December 15, 2021. On December 18, 2021, his nomination was confirmed in the United States Senate by voice vote. and presented his credentials on March 15, 2022.

== Community involvement ==
Adler served as chairman of Mount Sinai Medical Center, where he sits on the board of trustees, president of the Greater Miami Jewish Federation, where he was able to serve as a representative at the Conference of Presidents of Major American Jewish Organizations and as former vice chairman of Florida International University's board of trustees.

Diplomatic posts
Preceded by Ronald Gidwitz	United States Ambassador to Belgium; 2022–2025	Succeeded by Bill White
