= Henry Robertson Craig =

Scottish artist

- Born: 1916; Scotland, United Kingdom
- Died: 1984 (aged 67–68)

Henry "Harry" Robertson Craig (1916 – 1984) was a Scottish landscape and flower painter.

== Life ==
Henry Robertson Craig studied at the Dundee College of Art, where he met his lifelong companion the Irish artist, Patrick Hennessy. During World War II, he worked in espionage, moving to Ireland when he was demobilised in 1946, setting up a joint studio with Hennessy. He was appointed an academician of the Royal Hibernian Academy in 1956. His work is held in the Hugh Lane Gallery, the Irish Museum of Modern Art, and the National Self Portrait Collection, University of Limerick.
