= Ayres Phillips Merrill =

American planter and diplomat

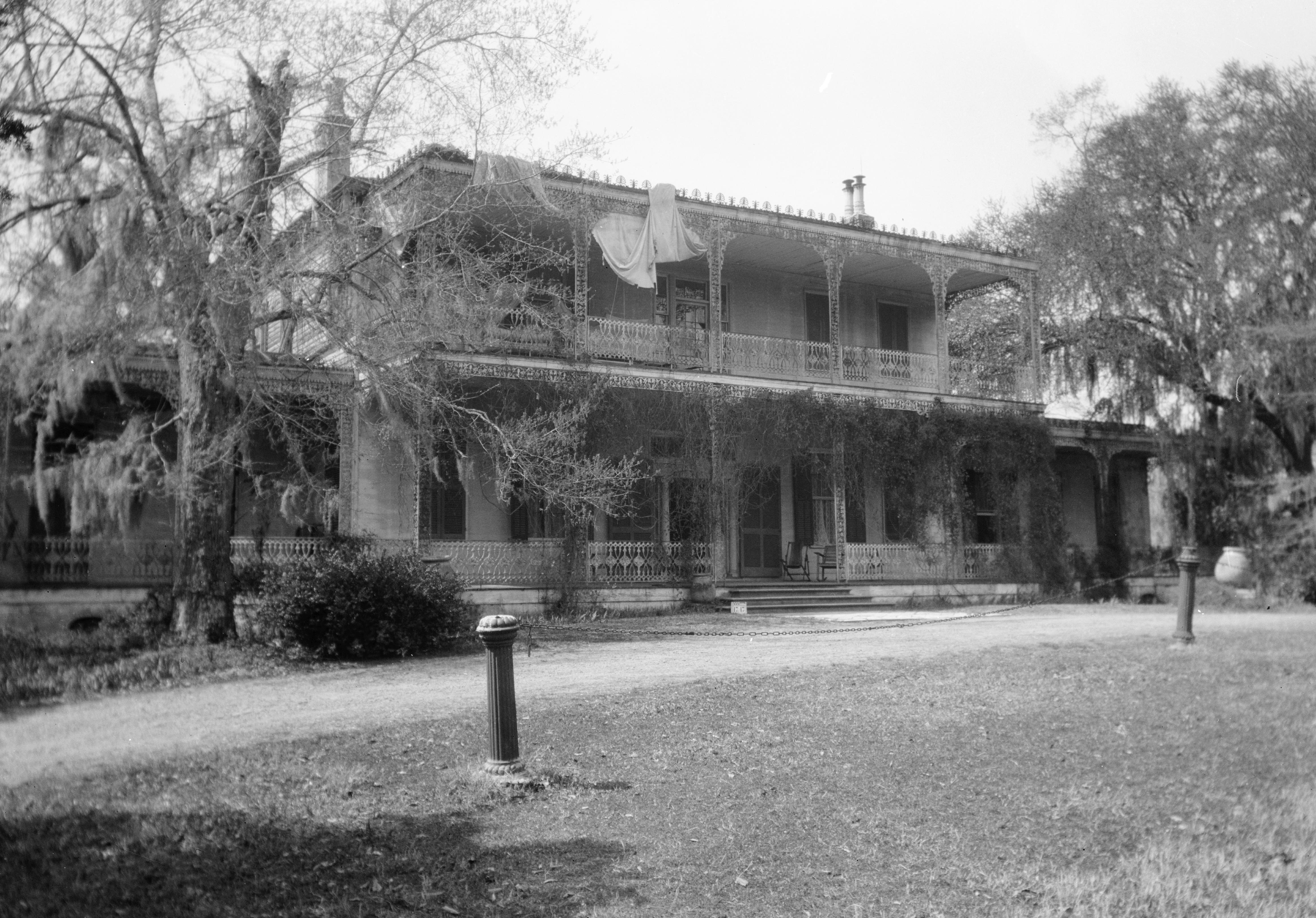
Merrill family home, Elms Court

Ayres Phillips Merrill (1825 – September 16, 1883) was an American planter and diplomat. He was the owner of a plantation in Adams County, Mississippi, and he served as the United States Minister Resident to Belgium from May 1876 to November 1877. He graduated from Harvard University in 1845. He and his family lived at Elms Court in Natchez.

He was the son of another Ayres Phillips Merrill, a physician.
