= Gerald Gidwitz =

American businessman (1906–2006)

Gerald S. Gidwitz (July 16, 1906 – July 11, 2006) was a co-founder of the cosmetics and salon parlour firm Helene Curtis Industries.

== Early life ==
Gidwitz was born in Memphis, Tennessee. His father was a cotton farmer and general store owner in Mississippi. When Gidwitz was 12 years old, his family moved to Chicago, Illinois, where his father started a business that made paper boxes.

== Helene Curtis ==
After graduating from the University of Chicago in 1927, Gidwitz worked at National Minerals Company with his brother, Willard. The Gidwitzes father had acquired the troubled beauty products company in settlement of a debt National Minerals owed the Gidwitz box company.

National Minerals' main product was a clay for beauty facials. Gerald and Willard Gidwitz helped refocus the company's product line toward beauty parlor supplies, including permanent wave solutions and hair dryers. In the late 1940s the company began marketing home beauty products, including shampoos and hair sprays. The company's first consumer product was a hair cream marketed under the Suave label.

National Minerals was renamed Helene Curtis Industries in 1956, when the company went public. Willard Gidwitz ran day-to-day operations, while Gerald Gidwitz focused on acquisitions and creating other companies. Gerald served as chairman of the company from 1952 to 1996, when it was bought by Unilever.

Gidwitz also founded or acquired companies in other economic sectors. In the 1980s he launched a company providing building supplies, Continental Materials Corporation. He also bought two companies that manufactured farm equipment.

== Political life ==
In the 1950s Gidwitz founded the anti-communist Education for Survival Foundation, which had the aim of making "every school district in the nation aware of the grim fact that we are engaged in a battle of the classroom with Russia."

During the Cold War, Gidwitz supported groups that assisted defectors from Soviet bloc countries. In 1962, he launched a monthly "Cold War digest" that provided information on military, political and technological aspects of the Cold War.

Gidwitz served on the board of Roosevelt University. Gidwitz funded literacy programs through Roosevelt University and worked with the National Planning Association, which creates programs to improve education and promote literacy. During the 1940s, he set up after-hours classes for workers at Helene Curtis.

In 2002, Gidwitz gave a grant to National-Louis University to create the Gidwitz Center for Urban Planning and Community Development.

He died on July 11, 2006, of congestive heart failure, five days shy of his 100th birthday.
