= John Jacob Seibels =

American diplomat

John Jacob Seibels (8 Dec 1816 Edgefield, South Carolina – 21 Aug 1865 Montgomery, Alabama) was an American diplomat. He was Chargé d'Affaires in Belgium from 1853 until he was promoted to Minister Resident on August 6, 1854. Seibels had his farewell audience September 14, 1856. He was nominated on February 25, 1856, to be Envoy Extraordinary and Minister Plenipotentiary but it was withdrawn before the Senate acted upon it.

Seibels was also a businessman and newspaper publisher.
