= E. Y. Fair =

American diplomat and lawyer (1809–1886)

Elisha Young Fair (July 2, 1809 – December 23, 1886) was a lawyer and minister to Belgium under president James Buchanan from his appointment on June 14, 1858 through May 8, 1861. Fair lived in Montgomery, Alabama where he also worked as a lawyer. He was a delegate at Alabama's 1865 Constitutional Convention. While he was serving in Belgium, Henry Hotze served in Brussels.

Fair was the son of William Fair (1770-1851) and Elizabeth (Young) Fair (1774-1854). He was part of South Carolina College's class of 1834. He married Martha Ann Cornelia Wyatt April 21, 1849. Fair's grandson, James Quinton Smith, served as Attorney General of Alabama.

== See also ==
- John Jacob Seibels
