= Nicholas Berliner =

American diplomat

Nicholas R. Berliner
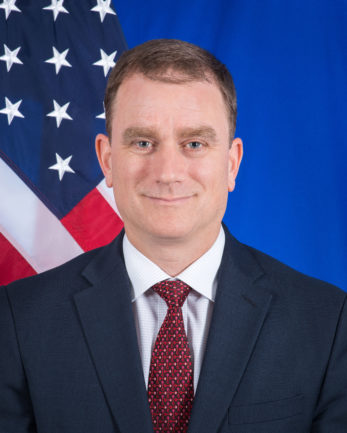
- official portrait, 2019

Special Assistant to the President & Senior Director for Russia and Central Asia at the National Security Council
- In office February 21, 2023 – 2025
- President: Joe Biden
- Preceded by: Eric Green

Deputy Assistant Secretary
- In office September 6, 2022 – February 17, 2023

Director of the Office of Russian Affairs
- In office August 2017 – July 2019

Personal details
- Spouse: Alemka Berliner
- Children: 3
- Education: Georgetown University (MA) Vassar College (BA)
- Awards: Presidential Meritorious Rank Award (2021)

Nicholas R. Berliner is an American diplomat who most recently served as Special Assistant to the President and Senior Director for Russia and Central Asia on the United States National Security Council under President Biden. Before acquiring these positions, he served as Deputy Assistant Secretary in the Bureau of European and Eurasian Affairs, where he was responsible for Russia, as well as non-proliferation, security assistance, and arms control from September 2022 to February 2023.

He previously served as Deputy Chief of Mission at the US Embassy in Belgium from 2019 to 2022.

== Education ==
In 1990, Berliner graduated from Vassar College with a Bachelor of Arts in History. In 1997, he attended Georgetown University in Washington D.C and received a Master of Science in Foreign Service (MSFS) degree in 1999.

== Awards ==
In 2021, Berliner was awarded the Presidential Meritorious Rank Award by 46th U.S President Joe Biden.

== Personal life ==
He is married and has three children. He enjoys spending time outdoors and his hobbies include hiking, sailing, and biking. He is fluent in Spanish, French, Croatian, and Russian.
