= Blinken (surname) =

Blinken is the surname of the following notable people:

- Alan Blinken (born 1937), American businessman and diplomat
- Antony Blinken (born 1962), American government official and diplomat; U.S. Secretary of State
- Donald M. Blinken (1925–2022), American businessman and diplomat, father of Antony and brother of Alan
- Meir Blinken (1879–1915), Ukrainian-American writer, grandfather of Alan and Donald
