= Blinken =

Antony Blinken (born 1962) is an American diplomat who served as United States Secretary of State from 2021 to 2025.

Blinken or Blynken may refer to

- Blinken (surname)
- Blinkenlights, diagnostic lights used on computers
- "Wynken, Blynken, and Nod", a poem by American writer Eugene Field
- Wynken, Blynken and Nod (film), a 1938 animated short film based on the poem by Field
