= 2002 United States Senate election in Idaho =

- November 4, 2002
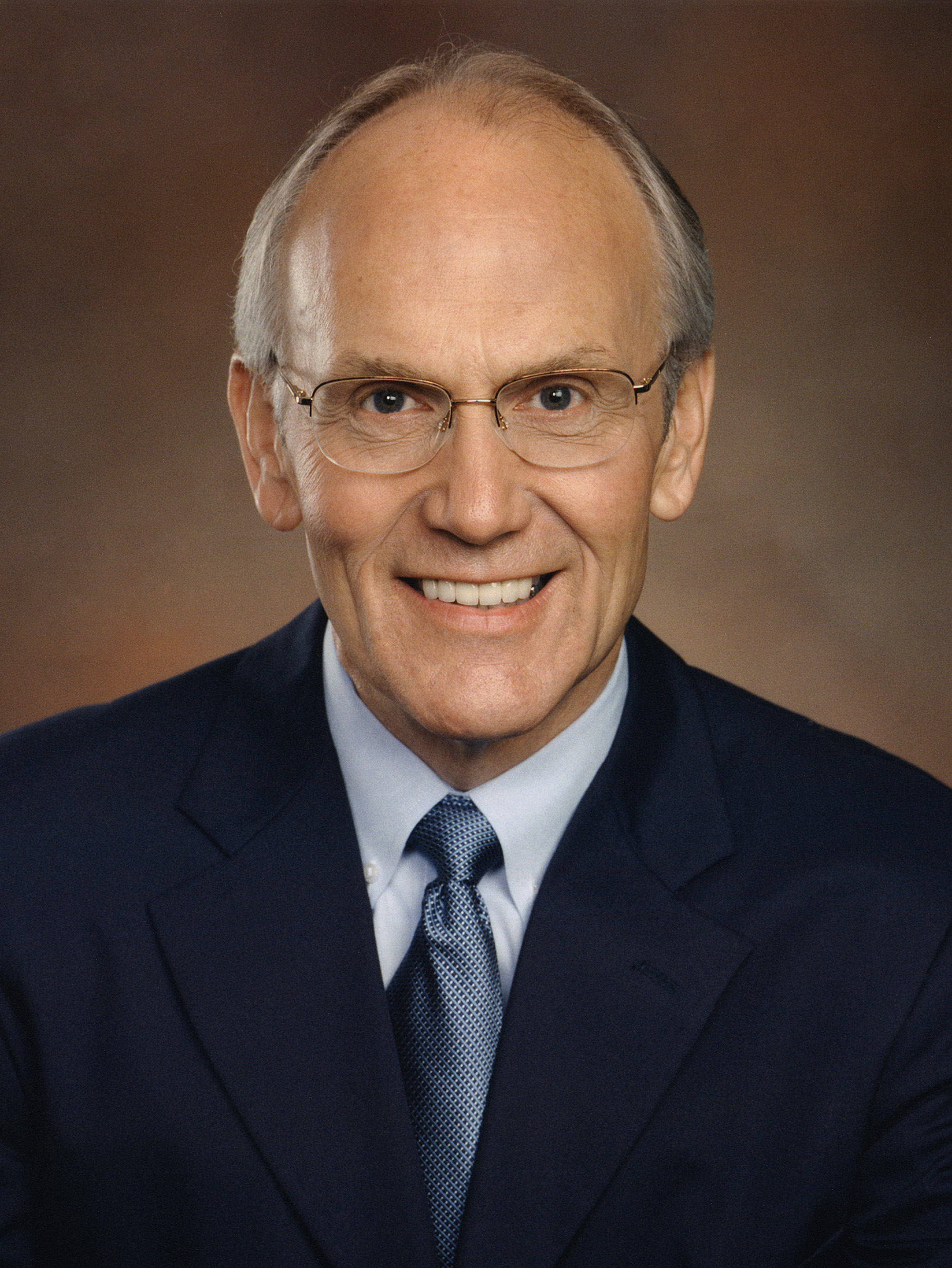

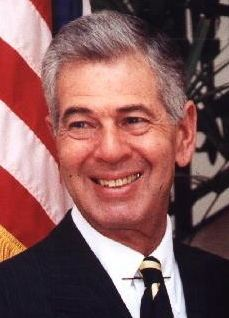
| Nominee | Larry Craig | Alan Blinken |
| Party | Republican | Democratic |
| Popular vote | 266,215 | 132,975 |
| Percentage | 65.16% | 32.55% |
- Craig: 40–50% 50–60% 60–70% 70–80% 80–90% >90% Blinken: 40–50% 50–60% 60–70% 70–80% Tie: 40–50% No data
U.S. senator before election
Larry Craig
Republican
Elected U.S. Senator
Larry Craig
Republican

The 2002 United States Senate election in Idaho took place on November 4, 2002. Incumbent Republican U.S. Senator Larry Craig won re-election to a third term.

== Democratic primary ==
=== Candidates ===
- Alan Blinken, former United States Ambassador to Belgium
- Dave Sneddon

=== Results ===
Results by county Blinken: 50–60%; 60–70%; 70–80%; 80–90%; 90–100%; Sneddon: 50–60%; Tie: 50%

Democratic primary results
| Party | Candidate | Votes | % |
|---|---|---|---|
| Democratic | Alan Blinken | 26,346 | 70.90% |
| Democratic | Dave Sneddon | 10,812 | 29.10% |
| Total votes | | 37,158 | 100.00% |

== Libertarian primary ==
=== Candidates ===
- Donovan Bramwell, perennial candidate

=== Results ===
Libertarian primary results
| Party | Candidate | Votes | % |
|---|---|---|---|
| Libertarian | Donovan Bramwell | 1,179 | 100.00% |
| Total votes | | 1,179 | 100.00% |

== Republican primary ==
=== Candidates ===
- Larry Craig, incumbent U.S. Senator

=== Results ===
Republican primary results
| Party | Candidate | Votes | % |
|---|---|---|---|
| Republican | Larry Craig (incumbent) | 130,126 | 100.00% |
| Total votes | | 130,126 | 100.00% |

== General election ==
=== Candidates ===
- Alan Blinken (D), former United States Ambassador to Belgium
- Donovan Bramwell (L), perennial candidate
- Larry Craig (R), incumbent U.S. Senator

=== Debates ===
- Complete video of debate, October 27, 2002
- Complete video of debate, October 30, 2002

=== Predictions ===
| Source | Ranking | As of |
|---|---|---|
| Sabato's Crystal Ball | Safe R | November 4, 2002 |

=== Results ===
General election results
| Party | Candidate | Votes | % | ±% |
|---|---|---|---|---|
| Republican | Larry Craig (incumbent) | 266,215 | 65.16% | +8.14% |
| Democratic | Alan Blinken | 132,975 | 32.55% | −7.36% |
| Libertarian | Donovan Bramwell | 9,354 | 2.29% | |
| Majority | | 133,240 | 32.61% | +15.50% |
| Turnout | | 408,544 | | |
| Republican hold | | | | |

==== Counties that flipped from Democratic to Republican ====
- Latah (largest municipality: Moscow)
- Shoshone (largest municipality: Kellogg)

== See also ==
- 2002 United States Senate elections
