= Donald M. Blinken =

American diplomat and businessman (1925–2022)

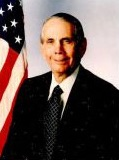

United States Ambassador to Hungary
- In office April 1, 1994 – November 20, 1997
- President: Bill Clinton
- Preceded by: Charles H. Thomas
- Succeeded by: Peter Tufo

Personal details
- Born: Donald Mayer Blinken; November 11, 1925 Yonkers, New York, U.S.
- Died: September 22, 2022 (aged 96) East Hampton, New York, U.S.
- Party: Democratic
- Spouses: Judith Frehm (m. 1958; div. 1971); Vera Evans (m. 1975)
- Children: Antony Blinken
- Relatives: Meir Blinken (grandfather); Alan Blinken (brother)
- Education: Harvard University (BA)

Donald Mayer Blinken (November 11, 1925 – September 22, 2022) was an American businessman and diplomat. A co-founder of the private equity firm Warburg Pincus, he was the chairman of the board of the State University of New York from 1978 to 1990. He also served as the United States Ambassador to Hungary from 1994 to 1997. His son, Antony Blinken, was the seventy-first United States Secretary of State, having served in the cabinet of President Joe Biden.

== Early life and education ==
Donald Mayer Blinken was born on November 11, 1925, in Yonkers, New York, the son of Maurice Blinken and his wife, Ethel (Horowitz). Maurice Blinken was an early backer of Israel and founded the American Palestine Institute which helped persuade the United States to back the creation of Israel. His father and mother were of Jewish descent and his father was from Kyiv, the Russian Empire, who, according to Antony Blinken, "fled pogroms in Russia". His grandfather was author Meir Blinken. Blinken has two brothers, Alan and Robert.

The brothers grew up both in New York City and Yonkers. They attended the Horace Mann School. Blinken graduated magna cum laude with a bachelor's degree in economics from Harvard University in 1948, after serving in the United States Army Air Corps during World War II in 1944.

== Career, Philanthropy, and Public Service ==
In 1966, Blinken co-founded E. M. Warburg Pincus & Company, a private equity firm in New York. He served as a director for Warburg Pincus, and served as chairman of the board of directors.

Blinken met Mark Rothko in 1956 and became an art collector. He was president of the Mark Rothko Foundation from 1976 to 1989. In 1984, the foundation distributed 1,000 art pieces to museums, including to the National Gallery of Art., where Blinken was a member of the trustee council.

Among his other philanthropic commitments, Blinken served as president of the Brooklyn Academy of Music from 1970 to 1976; as executive committee member for the New York Public Library; as board member and chairman of the Commentary Publication Committee (which at the time was a part of the American Jewish Committee); and as vice-chairman of the New York Philharmonic Symphony Society.

Blinken was appointed to the board of trustees for the State University of New York by Governor Hugh Carey in September 1976 and was appointed the board's chairman in 1978. The board clashed with Governor Mario Cuomo as Cuomo wanted the board to cut spending. Blinken announced his resignation from the board in October 1989, which took effect with the confirmation of his successor in 1990.

During the presidency of Jimmy Carter, Blinken served on a special nomination panel for the U.S. Court of Appeals. In 1994, President Bill Clinton nominated Blinken to be the United States Ambassador to Hungary. He was confirmed by the U.S. Senate and served in the role until 1997. From 2000 to 2004, Blinken was the secretary-general of the World Federation of United Nations Associations.

== Personal life ==
Blinken lived in the River House and in East Hampton, New York.

Blinken was married to Judith Frehm from 1958 until their divorce in 1971, and then married Vera Evans in 1975. Vera was a Holocaust survivor in Hungary during World War II; in 2009, the couple published a memoir about her escape from Communist Hungary and their time back in Hungary during his term as the U.S. Ambassador. In 2015, the Open Society Archives in Hungary was renamed the Vera and Donald Blinken Open Society Archives after receiving a major donation from the couple.

His son, Antony Blinken, from his first marriage, was the United States Secretary of State in the presidency of Joe Biden.

Blinken died in East Hampton on September 22, 2022, at age 96.

== General Reference ==
- Donald M. Blinken Papers, 1969-2003. M.E. Grenander Department of Special Collections and Archives, University Libraries, University at Albany, State University of New York (hereafter referred to as the Blinken Papers).
