= Meir Blinken =

American author (1879–1915)

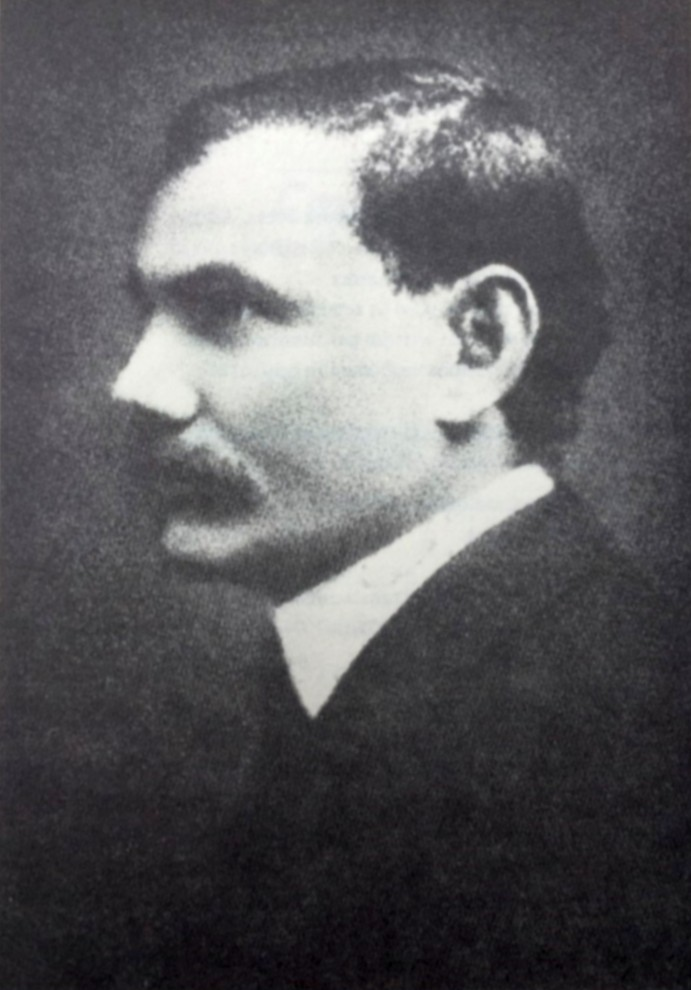
- Born: 1879; Pereiaslav, Poltava Governorate, Russian Empire
- Died: 1915 (aged 36 or 37); United States
- Relatives: Alan Blinken (grandson); Donald M. Blinken (grandson); Antony Blinken (great-grandson)

Meir Blinken (Russian: Меер Янкелевич Блинкин, romanized: Meyer Yankelevich Blinkin; 1879 – 1915) was a Jewish American author who published about 50 fiction and nonfiction works in Yiddish between 1904 and 1915.

== Early life ==
Blinken was born in 1879 in Pereiaslav, Russian Empire (now Ukraine), to Yankel Blinkin and Rys (Ruth) Kelman. There he studied at a religious Jewish primary school, followed by a business education in Kiev.

== Career ==
After starting a family, Blinken moved to the United States at age 25 in 1904. Over the next 10 years, while making a living in jobs that included carpentry and owning a massage business, Blinken published about 50 fiction and nonfiction works.

In 1908, Blinken published the book Weiber, one of the earliest Yiddish books to explicitly deal with women's sexuality, and perhaps the first book by a Yiddish writer in America to explore sexuality at all. Richard Elman commented on these themes in a review of Blinken's work in the 1980s, writing in The New York Times that in the community of Yiddish authors who wrote for the largely female literary audience of Yiddish fiction, Blinken "was one of the few who chose to show with empathy the woman's point of view in the act of love or sin". Ruth Wisse, a scholar of Yiddish literature, wrote that Blinken was highly popular among his own generation of Yiddish-speaking Americans but that his reputation quickly diminished in the years after his death. Emanuel S. Goldsmith characterized Blinken as part of a generation of Yiddish writers in America who developed a new form of Yiddish literature, and both Goldsmith and Elman emphasized that the major legacy of Blinken's work was that it vividly evoked the atmosphere and characters of the very early Jewish diaspora in New York.

Some of Blinken's collected works were published by the State University of New York Press in 1984, and have been included in other compendiums of Yiddish literature in the century after his death.

== Personal life ==
Blinken died in 1915, at the age of 36 or 37. His son, Maurice Blinken, was an early backer of Israel and founded the American Palestine Institute which helped persuade the United States to back the creation of Israel. Two of Blinken's grandsons, Alan Blinken and Donald Blinken, served as U.S. ambassador to Belgium and Hungary, respectively. Meir Blinken was the great-grandfather of former United States Secretary of State Antony Blinken.
