= Alan Blinken =

American businessman and politician (born 1937)

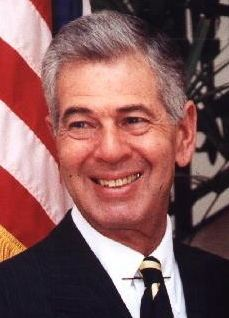

United States Ambassador to Belgium
- In office July 25, 1993 – December 27, 1997
- President: Bill Clinton
- Preceded by: Bruce Gelb
- Succeeded by: Paul L. Cejas

Personal details
- Born: Alan John Blinken; December 24, 1937 (age 88) New York City, New York, U.S.
- Party: Democratic
- Spouse: Melinda Koch
- Children: 4
- Relatives: Meir Blinken (grandfather); Donald M. Blinken (brother); Antony Blinken (nephew); Howard W. Koch (father-in-law); Hawk Koch (brother-in-law); Cooper Koch (great-nephew); Payton Koch (great-nephew)
- Education: Harvard University (BA)

Alan John Blinken (born December 24, 1937) is an American businessman, political candidate, and former diplomat who served as the United States Ambassador to Belgium from 1993 to 1997. Blinken was also the Democratic nominee in the 2002 United States Senate election in Idaho, losing to incumbent Larry Craig.

== Early life and education ==
Blinken was born on December 24, 1937, in New York City, the son of Ethel (Horowitz) and Maurice Blinken. His father was a Jewish immigrant from Kyiv. His older brother Donald M. Blinken, was also a diplomat. Blinken was raised in Manhattan and Yonkers, New York, and graduated from the Horace Mann School. Blinken earned a Bachelor of Arts degree from Harvard University. Blinken studied business and economics. His thesis advisor was John Kenneth Galbraith.

== Career ==
After graduating from Harvard, Blinken worked in the financial services industry, serving as president of Model Roland & Co. and as managing director of Wertheim Schroder & Co. He was a director of the Belgium-based biopharmaceutical manufacturer UCB. Blinken ran for the New York State Assembly in Manhattan, but lost to Republican John Ravitz.

Blinken served as United States ambassador to Belgium from 1993 to 1997.

A longtime resident of the Upper East Side, Blinken later relocated to Sun Valley, Idaho. In 2002, he was the Democratic nominee for United States Senate in Idaho. He was defeated by incumbent Republican Larry Craig.

== Personal life ==
Blinken was married to Melinda Blinken (née Koch), the daughter of Hollywood producer Howard W. Koch.

His father, Maurice Blinken, was an early backer of Israel and founded the American Palestine Institute which helped persuade the United States to back the creation of Israel.

Blinken is the grandson of the Ukrainian-born writer Meir Blinken, brother of Donald M. Blinken and uncle of former United States Secretary of State Antony Blinken. Blinken Auditorium at the Residential Academic Facility of The Washington Center is named after him.

Blinken and his wife resided in Ketchum, Idaho. In 2019, they hosted a fundraiser for then-candidate Joe Biden.

== Election history ==
1990 New York State Assembly election, 66th district
Party	Candidate	Votes	%
Republican	John Ravitz	12,841	54.15
Democratic	Alan Blinken	10,873	45.85
Majority		1,968	8.3
Turnout		23,714	
Republican gain from Democratic			

2002 U.S. Senate election in Idaho
Party	Candidate	Votes	%	±%
Republican	Larry Craig (incumbent)	266,215	65.16%	+8.14%
Democratic	Alan Blinken	132,975	32.55%	−7.36%
Libertarian	Donovan Bramwell	9,354	2.29%	
Majority		133,240	32.61%	+15.50%
Turnout		408,544		
Republican hold		Swing		

== See also ==
- United States Ambassador to Belgium
- Foreign relations of Belgium

Party political offices
Preceded by Walt Minnick	Democratic Party nominee, U.S. Senator (Class 2) from Idaho; 2002 (lost)	Succeeded by Larry LaRocco
Diplomatic posts
Preceded by Bruce Gelb	United States Ambassador to Belgium; 1993-1997	Succeeded by Paul L. Cejas
