= Antony Blinken =

American lawyer and diplomat (born 1962)

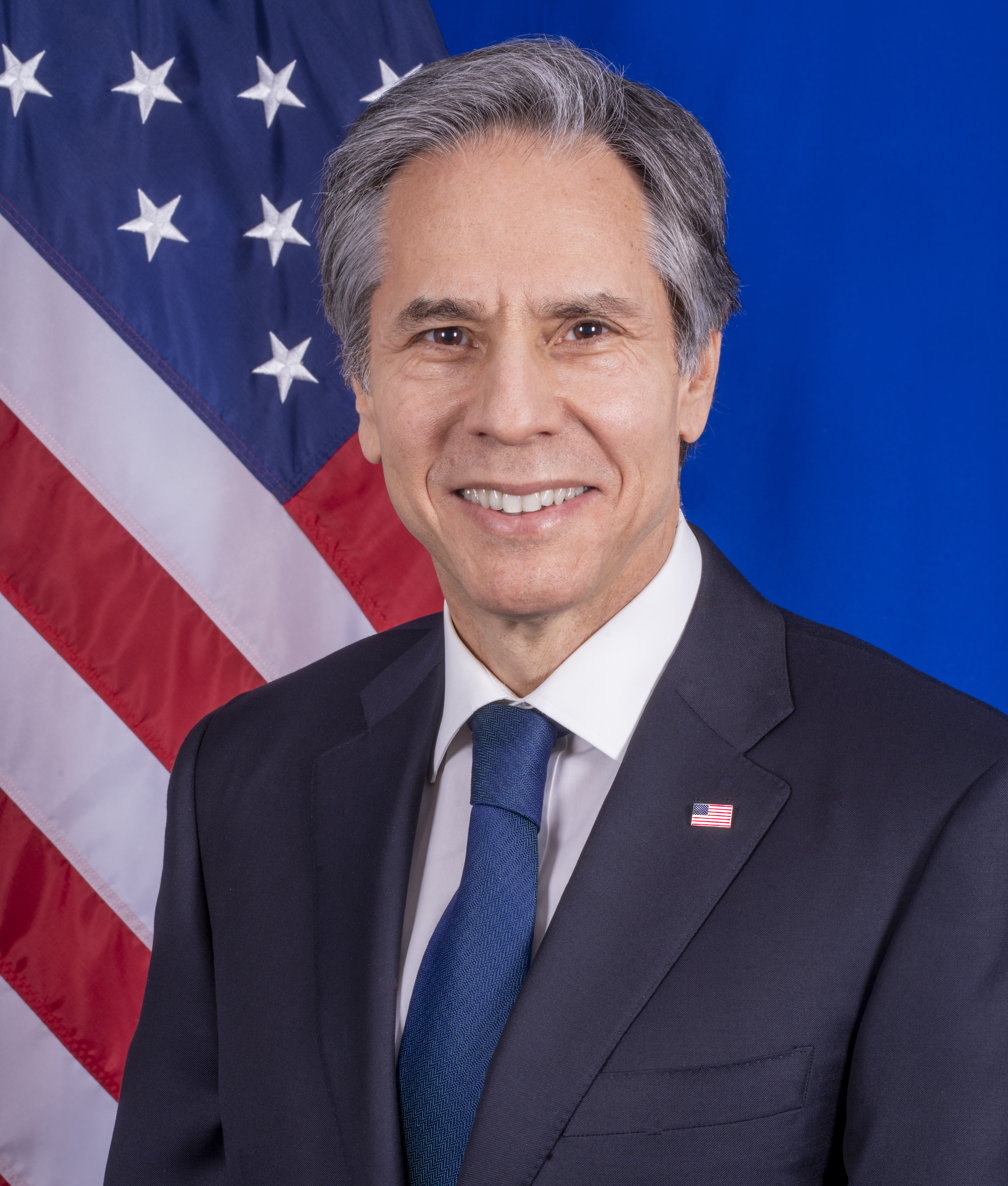
- Official portrait, 2021

71st United States Secretary of State
- In office January 26, 2021 – January 20, 2025
- President: Joe Biden
- Deputy: Wendy Sherman; Victoria Nuland (acting); Kurt M. Campbell
- Preceded by: Mike Pompeo
- Succeeded by: Marco Rubio

18th United States Deputy Secretary of State
- In office January 9, 2015 – January 20, 2017
- President: Barack Obama
- Preceded by: Bill Burns
- Succeeded by: John Sullivan

26th United States Deputy National Security Advisor
- In office January 20, 2013 – January 9, 2015
- President: Barack Obama
- Leader: Susan Rice
- Preceded by: Denis McDonough
- Succeeded by: Avril Haines

National Security Advisor to the Vice President
- In office January 20, 2009 – January 20, 2013
- Vice President: Joe Biden
- Preceded by: John P. Hannah
- Succeeded by: Jake Sullivan

Personal details
- Born: Antony John Blinken; April 16, 1962 (age 64) Yonkers, New York, U.S.
- Party: Democratic
- Spouse: Evan Ryan (m. 2002)
- Children: 2
- Relatives: Donald M. Blinken (father); Meir Blinken (great-grandfather); Alan Blinken (uncle); Samuel Pisar (stepfather)
- Education: Harvard University (BA); Columbia University (JD)
- Blinken's voice Blinken on Ukraine military aid and on Swedish and Finnish accession to NATO; Recorded January 17, 2023

Antony John Blinken (born April 16, 1962) is an American lawyer and diplomat who served as the 71st United States secretary of state from 2021 to 2025. He previously served as deputy national security advisor from 2013 to 2015 and deputy secretary of state from 2015 to 2017 under President Barack Obama. Blinken was previously national security advisor to then-vice president Joe Biden from 2009 to 2013.

During the Clinton administration, Blinken served in the State Department and in senior positions on the National Security Council from 1994 to 2001. He was a senior fellow at the Center for Strategic and International Studies from 2001 to 2002. He advocated for the 2003 invasion of Iraq while serving as the Democratic staff director of the Senate Foreign Relations Committee from 2002 to 2008. He was a foreign policy advisor for Joe Biden's 2008 presidential campaign, before advising the Obama–Biden presidential transition.

From 2009 to 2013, Blinken served as deputy assistant to the president and national security advisor to the vice president. During his tenure in the Obama administration, he helped craft U.S. policy on Afghanistan, Pakistan, and the nuclear program of Iran. After leaving government service, Blinken moved into the private sector, co-founding WestExec Advisors, a consulting firm. Blinken returned to government first as a foreign policy advisor for Biden's 2020 presidential campaign, then as Biden's pick for secretary of state, a position the Senate confirmed him for on January 26, 2021.

== Early life and education ==
Blinken was born on April 16, 1962, in Yonkers, New York, to Jewish parents. His mother was Judith (née Frehm) Blinken and his father was Donald M. Blinken, a co-founder of the private equity firm Warburg Pincus who later served as the U.S. ambassador to Hungary. His maternal grandparents were Hungarian Jews. Blinken's uncle, Alan Blinken, served as the U.S. ambassador to Belgium. His grandfather, Maurice Henry Blinken, was an early backer of Israel who studied its economic viability, and his great-grandfather was Meir Blinken, a Yiddish writer.

Blinken attended the Dalton School in New York City until 1971. He then moved to Paris with his mother and Samuel Pisar; his mother married Pisar after divorcing Donald Blinken. In his confirmation hearing, Blinken recalled the story of his stepfather, Pisar, who had been the only Holocaust survivor of the 900 children in his school in Poland. Pisar found refuge in a U.S. tank after making a break into the forest during a Nazi death march. In Paris, Blinken attended École Jeannine Manuel.

From 1980 to 1984, Blinken attended Harvard College, where he majored in social studies. He co-edited Harvard's daily student newspaper, The Harvard Crimson, and wrote a number of articles on current affairs. After graduating from the university, Blinken worked as an intern for The New Republic for about a year. He earned a J.D. from Columbia Law School in 1988 and practiced law in New York City and Paris. Blinken worked with his father to raise funds for Michael Dukakis, the Democratic nominee in the 1988 United States presidential election. He aspired for a time to be a journalist or a film producer.

In his monograph Ally versus Ally: America, Europe, and the Siberian Pipeline Crisis (1987), Blinken argued that exerting diplomatic pressure on the Soviet Union during the Siberian pipeline crisis was less significant for American interests than maintaining strong relations between the United States and Europe. Ally versus Ally was based on Blinken's undergraduate thesis in which he interviewed Henry Kissinger.

== Early diplomatic career (1994–2001) ==
Blinken has held senior foreign policy positions in two administrations over two decades. He was a member of the United States National Security Council staff from 1994 to 2001. From 1994 to 1998, Blinken was special assistant to the president and senior director for strategic planning and National Security Council senior director for speechwriting. From 1999 to 2001, he was special assistant to the president and senior director for European and Canadian affairs.

== Diplomatic career ==
=== Clinton and Bush administrations ===
In 2002, Blinken was appointed staff director for the Senate Foreign Relations Committee, a position he served in until 2008. Blinken assisted then-Senator Joe Biden, Chair of the Senate Foreign Relations Committee, in formulating Biden's support for the U.S. invasion of Iraq, with Blinken characterizing the vote to invade Iraq as "a vote for tough diplomacy". Blinken supported the U.S.-led invasion of Iraq in 2003.

In the years following the U.S. invasion and occupation of Iraq, Blinken assisted Biden in formulating a proposal in the Senate to establish in Iraq three independent regions divided along ethnic or sectarian lines: a "Shiastan" in the south, a "Sunnistan" in the north, as well as Iraqi Kurdistan. The proposal was overwhelmingly rejected at home, as well as in Iraq, where the prime minister opposed the partition plan.

He was also a senior fellow at the Center for Strategic and International Studies. In 2008, Blinken worked for Joe Biden's presidential campaign, and was a member of the Obama–Biden presidential transition team.

=== Obama administration ===
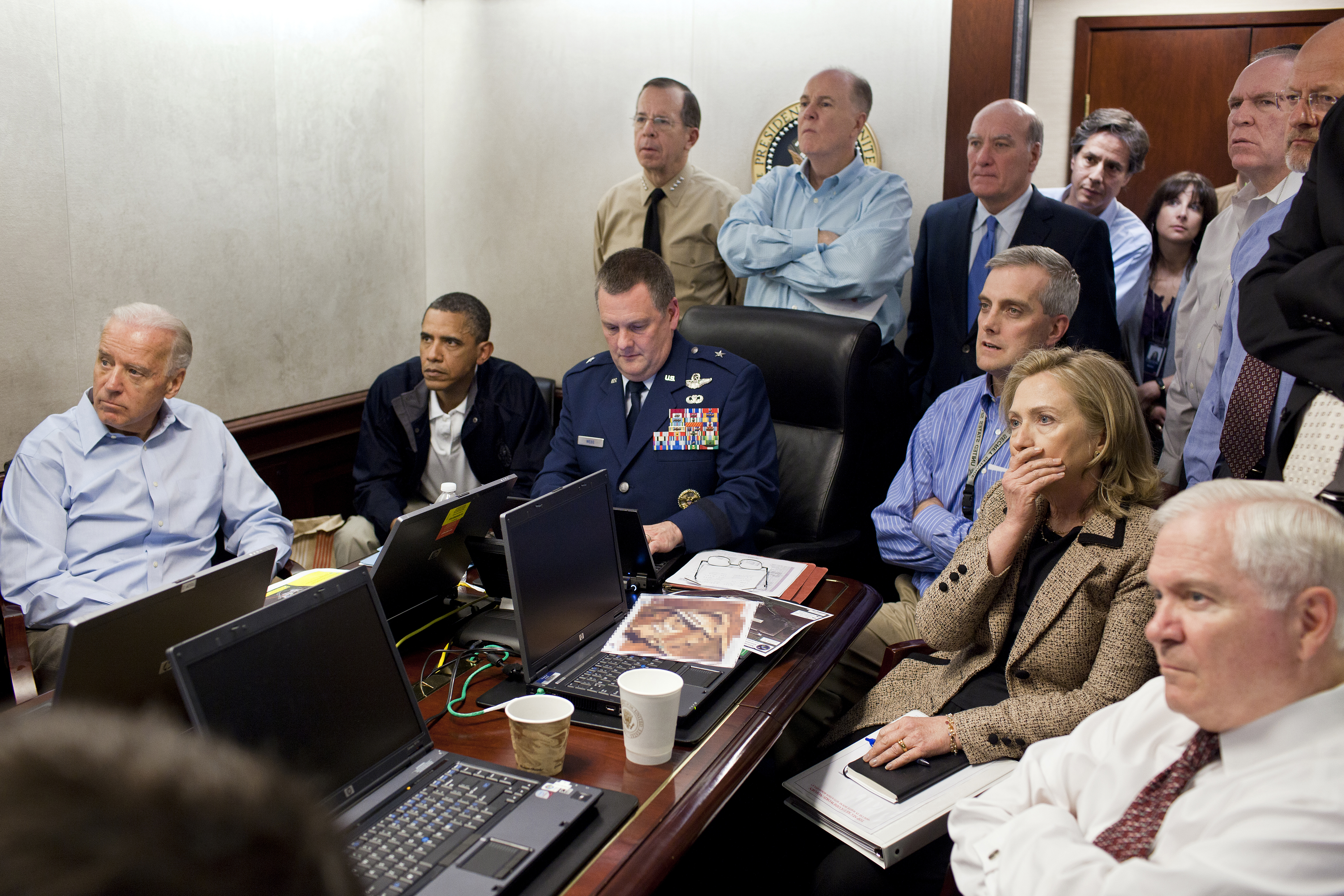
Blinken in the White House Situation Room (back of the room, blue shirt, leaning) during the Osama Bin Laden raid, as seen in the photograph named Situation Room

From 2009 to 2013, Blinken was deputy assistant to the president and National Security Advisor to the Vice President. In this position he helped craft U.S. policy on Afghanistan, Pakistan, and the nuclear program of Iran. Blinken was sworn in as deputy national security advisor, succeeding Denis McDonough, on January 20, 2013.

On November 7, 2014, President Obama announced that he would nominate Blinken for the deputy secretary post, replacing the retiring William J. Burns. On December 16, 2014, Blinken was confirmed as Deputy Secretary of State by the Senate by a vote of 55 to 38.

Of Obama's 2011 decision to kill Osama bin Laden, Blinken said "I've never seen a more courageous decision made by a leader." A 2013 profile described him as "one of the government's key players in drafting Syria policy", for which he served as a public face. Blinken was influential in formulating the Obama administration's response to the annexation of Crimea by the Russian Federation in the aftermath of the 2014 Ukrainian revolution.

Blinken supported the 2011 military intervention in Libya and the supply of weapons to Syrian rebels. He condemned the 2016 Turkish coup d'état attempt and expressed support for the democratically elected Turkish government and its institutions, but also criticized the 2016–present purges in Turkey. In April 2015, Blinken voiced support for the Saudi Arabian–led intervention in Yemen. He said that "as part of that effort, we have expedited weapons deliveries, we have increased our intelligence sharing, and we have established a joint coordination planning cell in the Saudi operation centre."

Blinken worked with Biden on requests for American money to replenish Israel's arsenal of Iron Dome interceptor missiles during the 2014 Israel–Gaza conflict. In May 2015, Blinken criticized the persecution of Muslims in Myanmar and warned Myanmar's leaders about the dangers of anti-Muslim legislation, saying that Rohingya Muslims "should have a path to citizenship. The uncertainty that comes from not having any status is one of the things that may drive people to leave."

In June 2015, Blinken claimed that more than ten thousand ISIL fighters had been killed by American-led airstrikes against the Islamic State since a U.S.-led coalition launched a campaign against it nine months previously.

== U.S. Secretary of State (2021–2025) ==
=== Nomination and confirmation ===
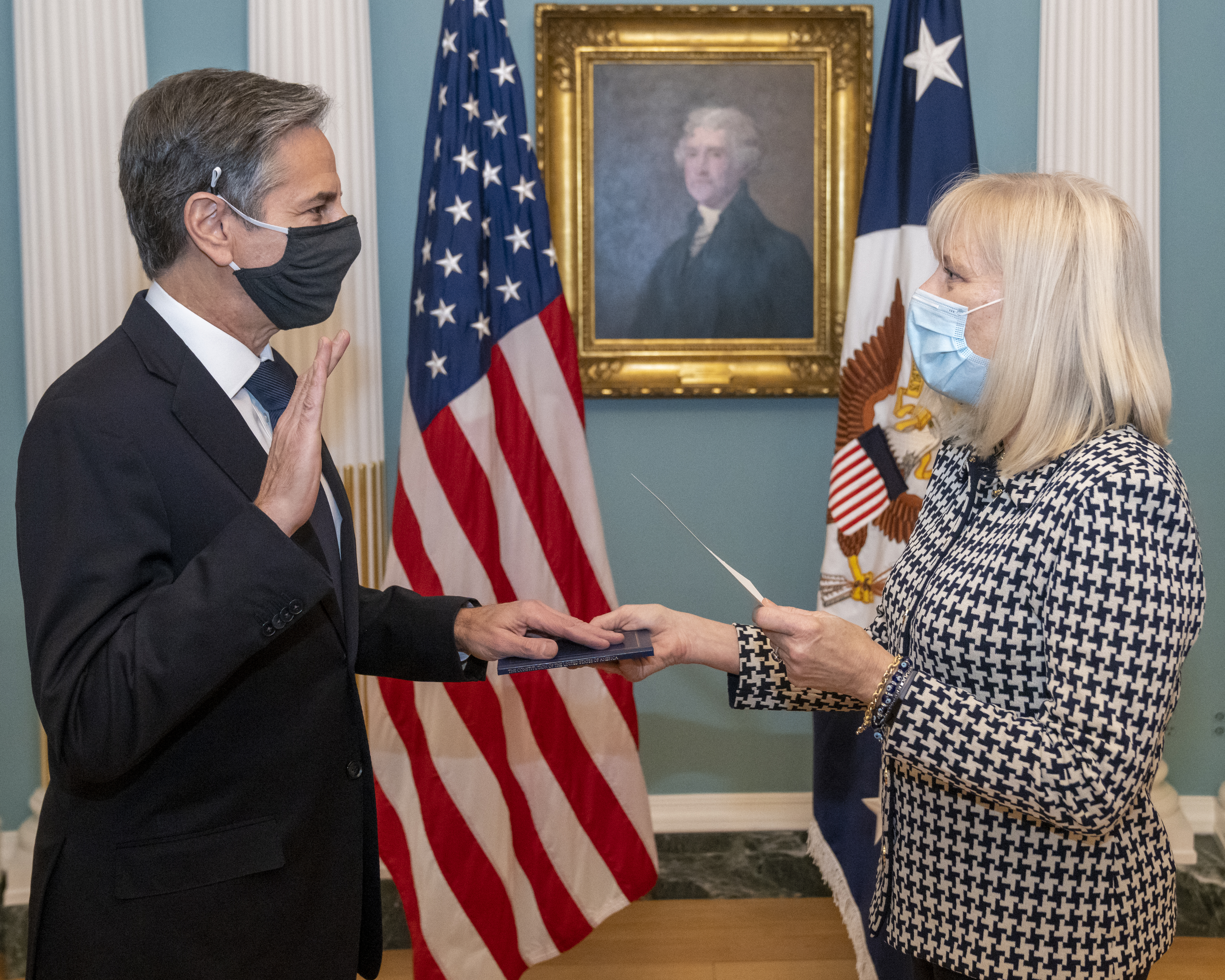
Blinken being sworn in as Secretary of State at the U.S. State Department on January 26, 2021

Blinken was a foreign policy advisor for Biden's 2020 presidential campaign. On November 22, 2020, Bloomberg News reported that Biden had selected Blinken as his nominee for secretary of state. These reports were later corroborated by The New York Times and other outlets. On November 24, upon being announced as Biden's choice for secretary of state, Blinken said, "We can't solve all the world's problems alone [and] we need to be working with other countries." He had earlier remarked in a September 2020 interview with the Associated Press that "democracy is in retreat around the world, and unfortunately it's also in retreat at home because of the president taking a two-by-four to its institutions, its values and its people every day."

Blinken's confirmation hearing before the Senate Foreign Relations Committee began on January 19, 2021. His nomination was confirmed by the committee on January 25 with a vote of 15–3. On January 26, Blinken was confirmed in the full Senate by a vote of 78–22. Blinken took the oath of office of the secretary of state later that day. In doing so, he became the third former deputy secretary of state to serve as the Secretary of State, after Lawrence Eagleburger and Warren Christopher in 1992 and 1993, respectively.

=== Tenure ===
==== Africa ====
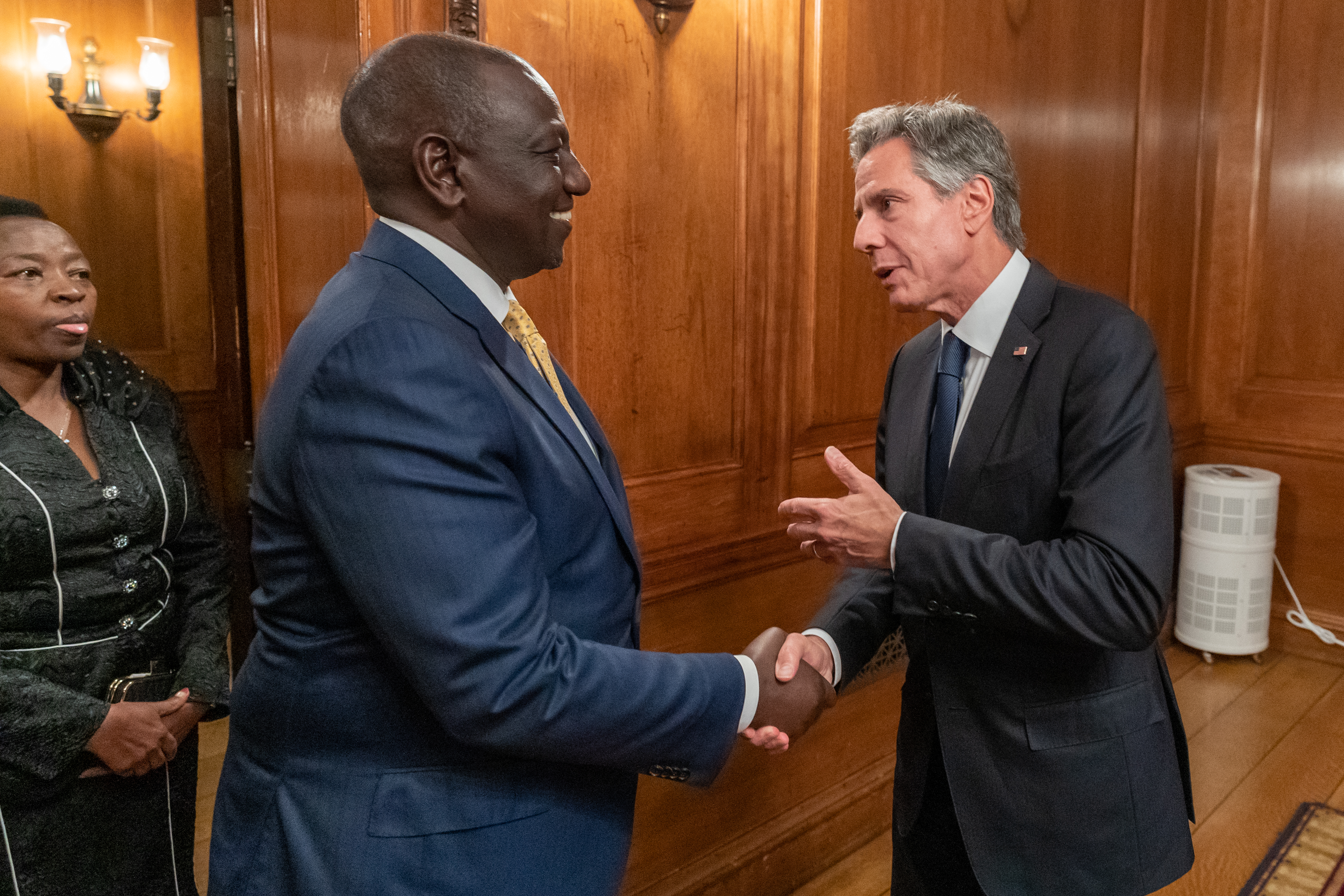
Blinken meeting with Kenyan President William Ruto on September 21, 2022

In February 2021, Blinken condemned ethnic cleansing in the Tigray region of northern Ethiopia and called for the immediate withdrawal of Eritrean forces and other fighters.

In the midst of the Biden administration's continuing review of the normalization agreement between Morocco and Israel enacted during the previous administration, Blinken maintained that the recognition of Morocco's sovereignty over the disputed territory of Western Sahara, which was annexed by Morocco in 1975, will not be reversed imminently. During internal discussions, he supported improving relations between the two countries and expressed urgency in appointing a United Nations envoy to Western Sahara.

In March 2023, Blinken met with Ethiopian prime minister Abiy Ahmed in Addis Ababa to normalize relations between the United States and Ethiopia that were strained by the Tigray War between the Ethiopian government and Tigray rebels.

In January 2025, Blinken declared that the combatants in the Sudanese civil war were carrying out a genocide.

==== Asia ====
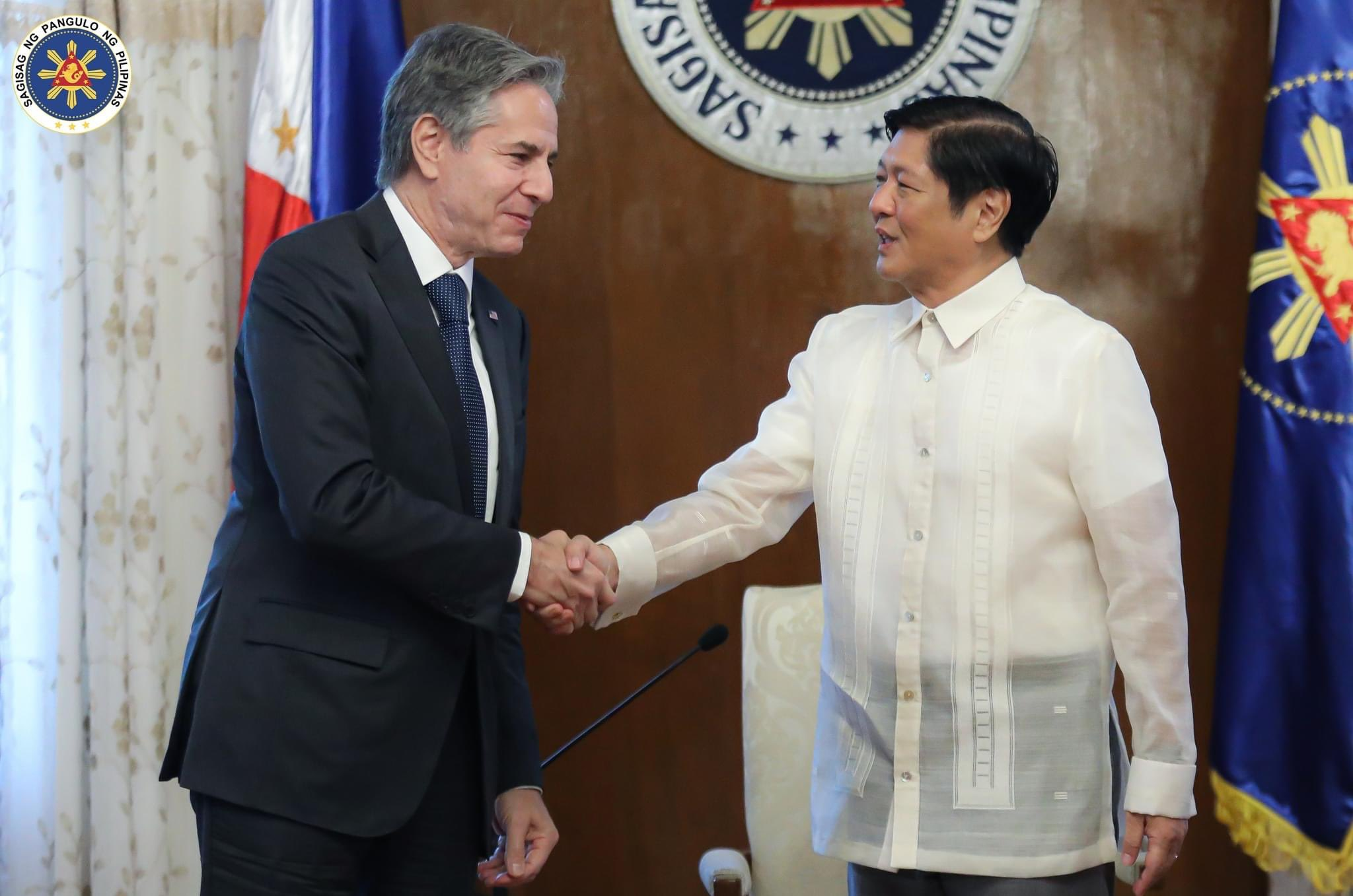
Blinken with Philippine President Bongbong Marcos in Manila on August 6, 2022

Blinken made his first international trip with Secretary of Defense Lloyd Austin to Tokyo and Seoul on March 15, during which he warned China against coercion and aggression. He also condemned the Chinese government for committing genocide against ethnic Uyghurs.

In July 2021, the Biden administration accused China of a global cyberespionage campaign, which Blinken said posed "a major threat to our economic and national security".

In late April 2021, Blinken denounced the sentencing of Hong Kong pro-democracy activists Jimmy Lai, Albert Ho, and Lee Cheuk-yan among others, for their roles in the 2019 Hong Kong protests, calling it a "politically-motivated" decision.

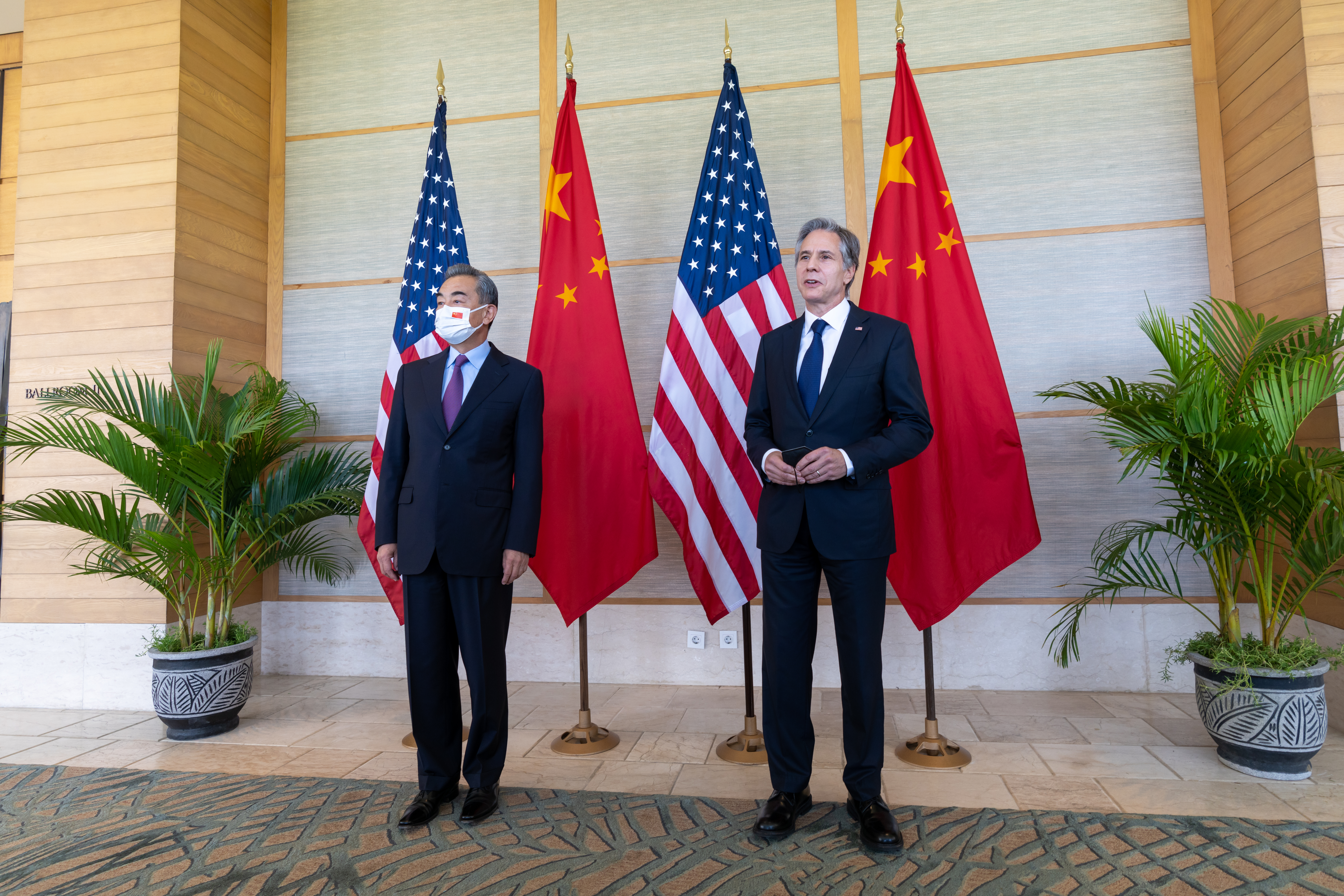
Secretary of State Antony J. Blinken meets with Chinese State Councilor and Foreign Minister Wang Yi in Bali, Indonesia, on July 9, 2022.

In May 2022, Blinken stated that "China is the one country that has the intention as well as the economic, technological, military and diplomatic means to advance a different vision of international order." He dismissed China's claims to be neutral in the Russo-Ukrainian War and accused China of supporting Russia.

In May 2022, Blinken says U.S. to rely on "Alliances", "Trade" and "Investment" to counter China, and focus on defending the rules-based order Beijing is trying to reshape.

In June 2023, Blinken met with Chinese president Xi Jinping during his trip to Beijing. According to the State Department's readout, Blinken "emphasized the importance of maintaining open channels of communication across the full range of issues to reduce the risk of miscalculation" and "made clear that while we will compete vigorously, the United States will responsibly manage that competition so that the relationship does not veer into conflict."

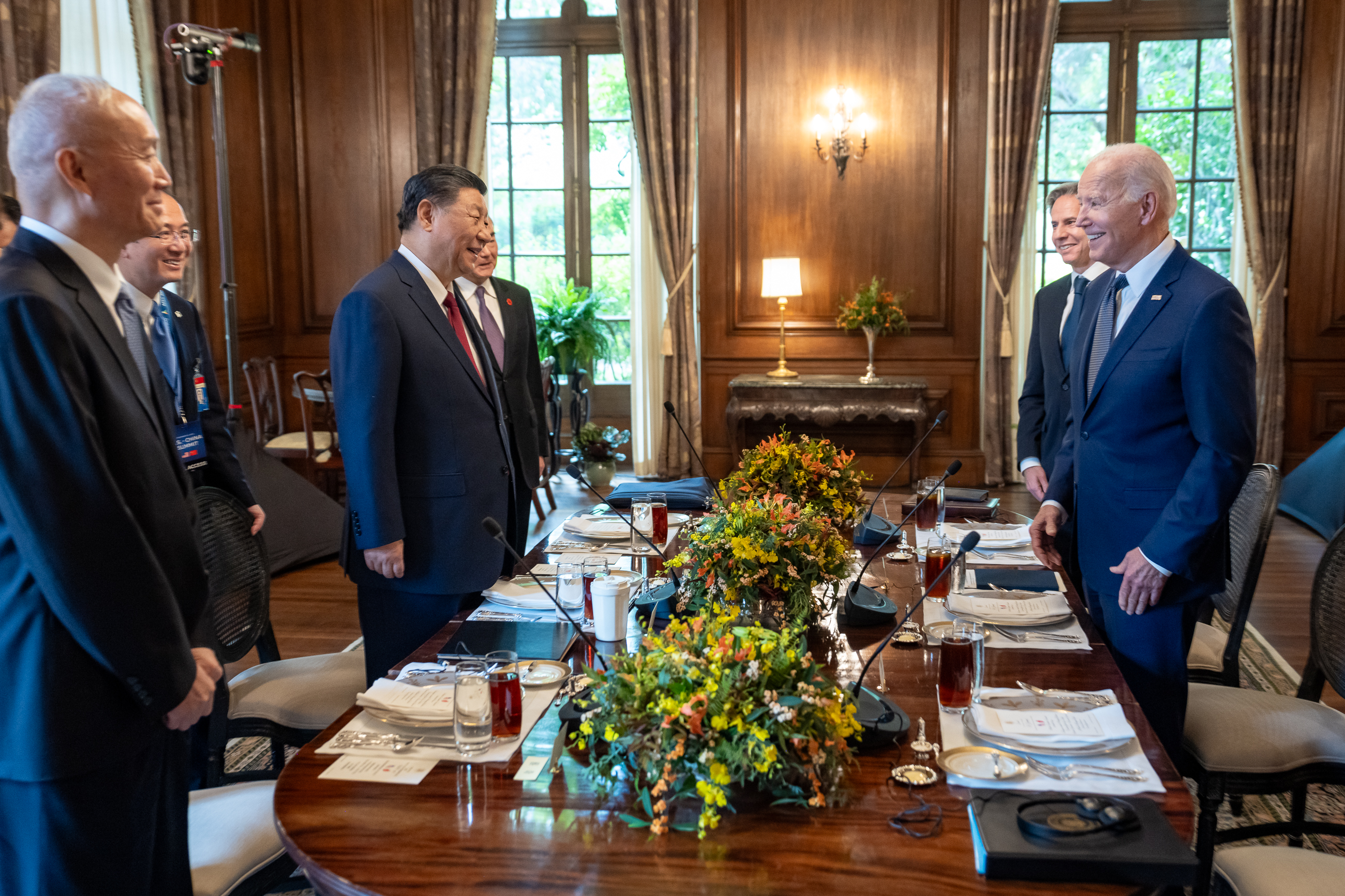
Biden and Blinken meet Xi and Yi at the 2023 Woodside Summit.

On November 15, 2023, Blinken accompanied Biden as together they hosted Xi Jinping and Wang Yi in Woodside, California and the so-called 2023 Woodside Summit. Top-level cabinet officials, such as Janet Yellen and John Kerry also were at the meeting table there.

==== Myanmar ====
On January 31, 2021, Blinken condemned the 2021 Myanmar coup d'état and expressed grave concerns on the detention of government officials and civil society leaders, calling for their immediate release. He stated that, "the United States will continue to take firm action against those who perpetrate violence against the people of Burma as they demand the restoration of their democratically elected government."

==== Afghanistan ====
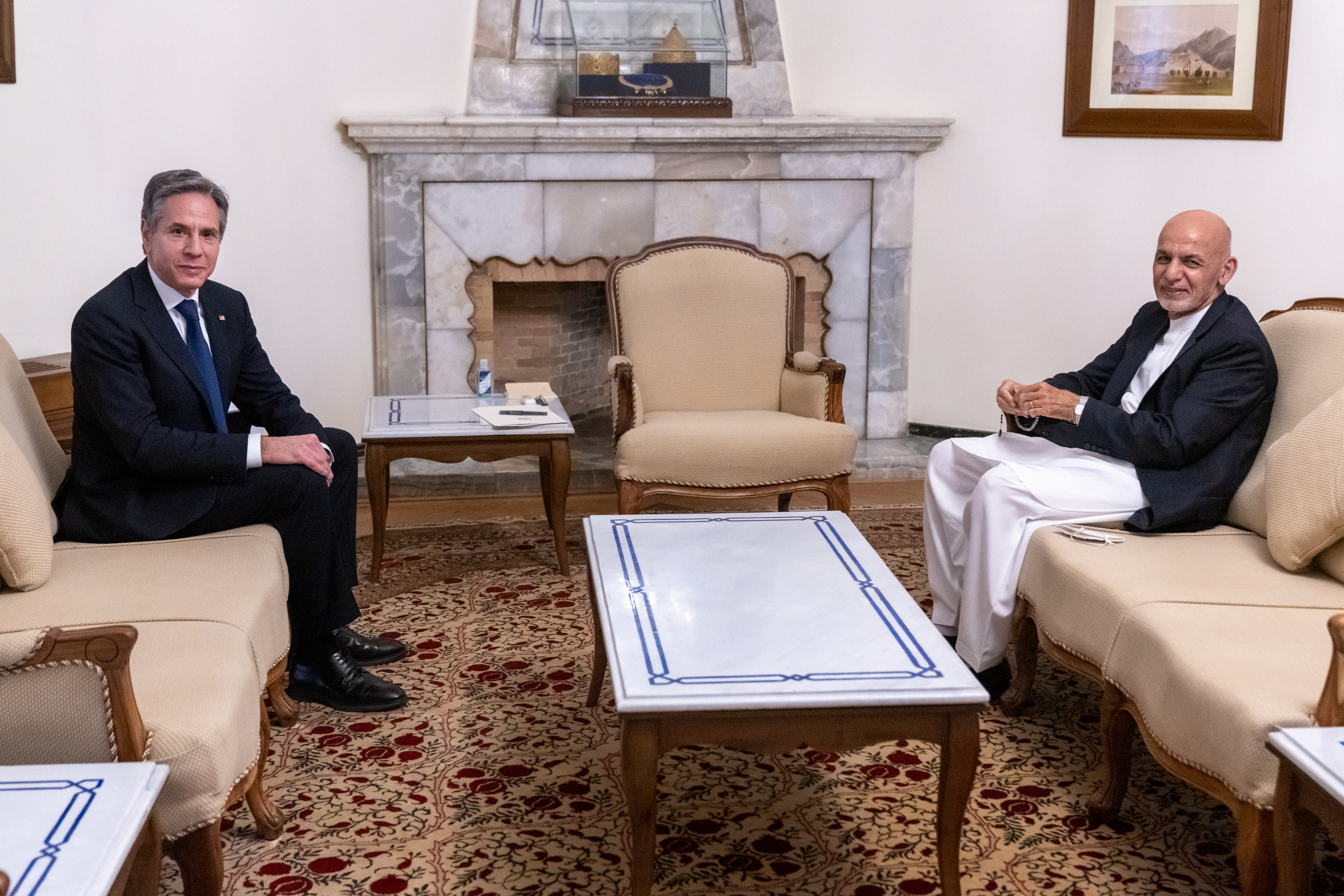
Blinken meeting with Afghan president Ashraf Ghani to discuss U.S. troop withdrawal

In February 2021, having spoken to president Ashraf Ghani, Blinken voiced support for Afghan peace negotiations with Taliban Islamist rebels and reiterated the United States' commitment to a peace deal that includes a "just and durable political settlement and permanent and comprehensive ceasefire."

Blinken made an unannounced visit to Kabul on April 15 and met with U.S. military and diplomatic personnel following the Biden administration's announcement of the 2021 withdrawal of U.S. troops from Afghanistan. He said the decision to withdraw from Afghanistan was made to focus resources on China and the COVID-19 pandemic. He faced calls to resign as secretary of state following the US withdrawal from Afghanistan.

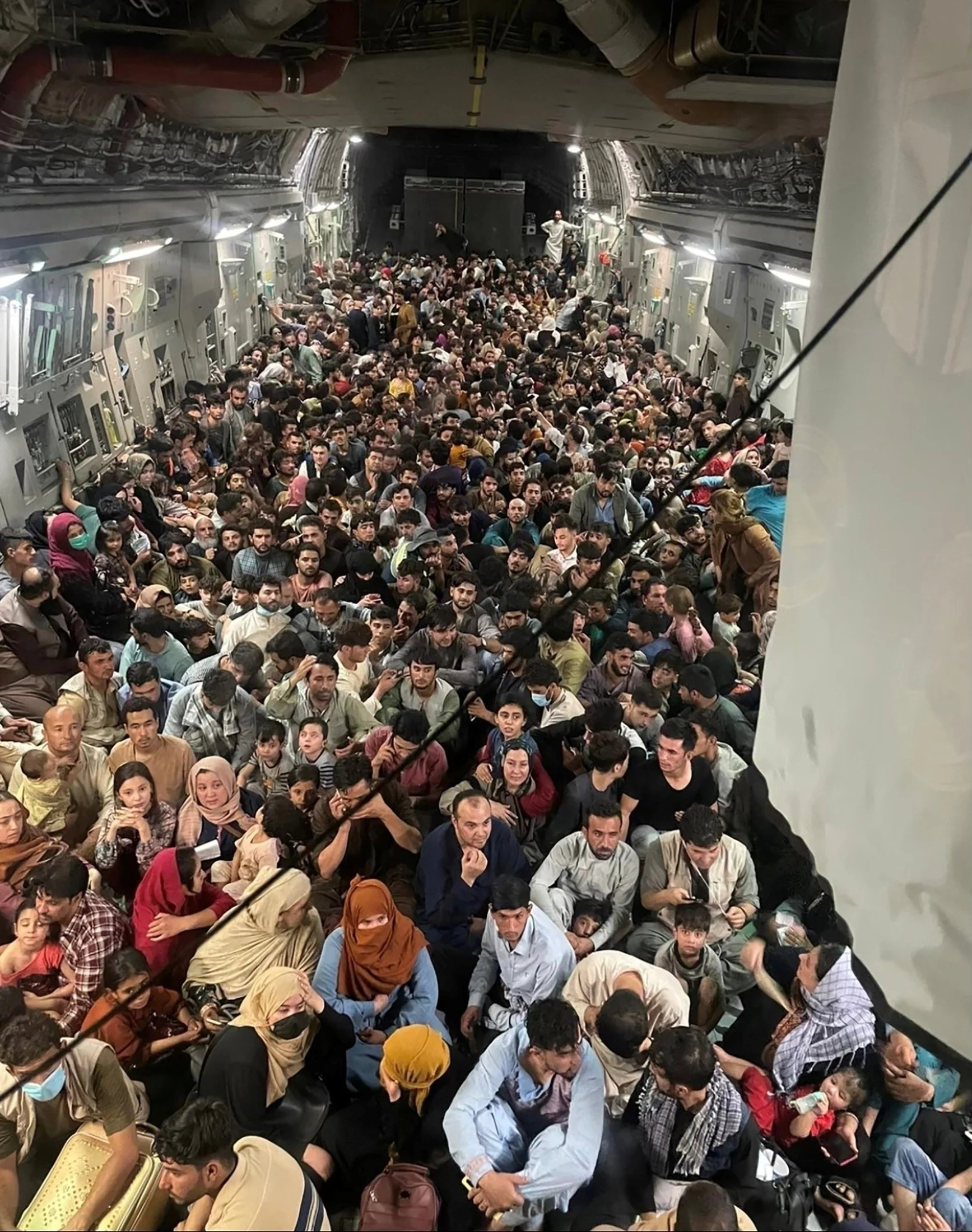
A USAF C-17 evacuating 823 fleeing Afghan citizens from Kabul Airport on August 15, 2021

In August 2021, Blinken rejected comparisons between the deteriorating situation in Afghanistan due to the Taliban offensive, which started in May 2021 after U.S. and coalition military forces began withdrawing from Afghanistan, and the chaotic American departure from Saigon in 1975, saying that "We went to Afghanistan 20 years ago with one mission, and that mission was to deal with the folks who attacked us on 9/11 and we have succeeded in that mission."

On September 25, 2024, the United States House of Representatives passed a resolution condemning the Biden-Harris administration for the U.S. withdrawal from Afghanistan. The resolution passed 219-194, with 10 Democrats and all Republicans voting in favor. Two New York Times diplomatic correspondents in a 2025 end of term assessment called the withdrawal Blinken's first test as Secretary of State, stating it was widely considered a fiasco.

==== Israel–Palestine ====
During the 2021 Israeli-Palestinian conflict, Blinken expressed "absolute" support for Israel's right to defend itself but warned that evicting Palestinian families from their homes in East Jerusalem is among the actions that could further escalate outbreaks of violence and retaliation. He, along with the United Nations Security Council, called for full adherence to the truce and stressed the immediate need for humanitarian aid for Palestinian civilians while reiterating the need for a two-state solution. Following a ceasefire and coinciding Blinken's visit to Jerusalem on May 25, the transfer of food and medical supplies furnished by the United Nations and Physicians for Human Rights, aid workers, and journalists were permitted into the Gaza Strip.

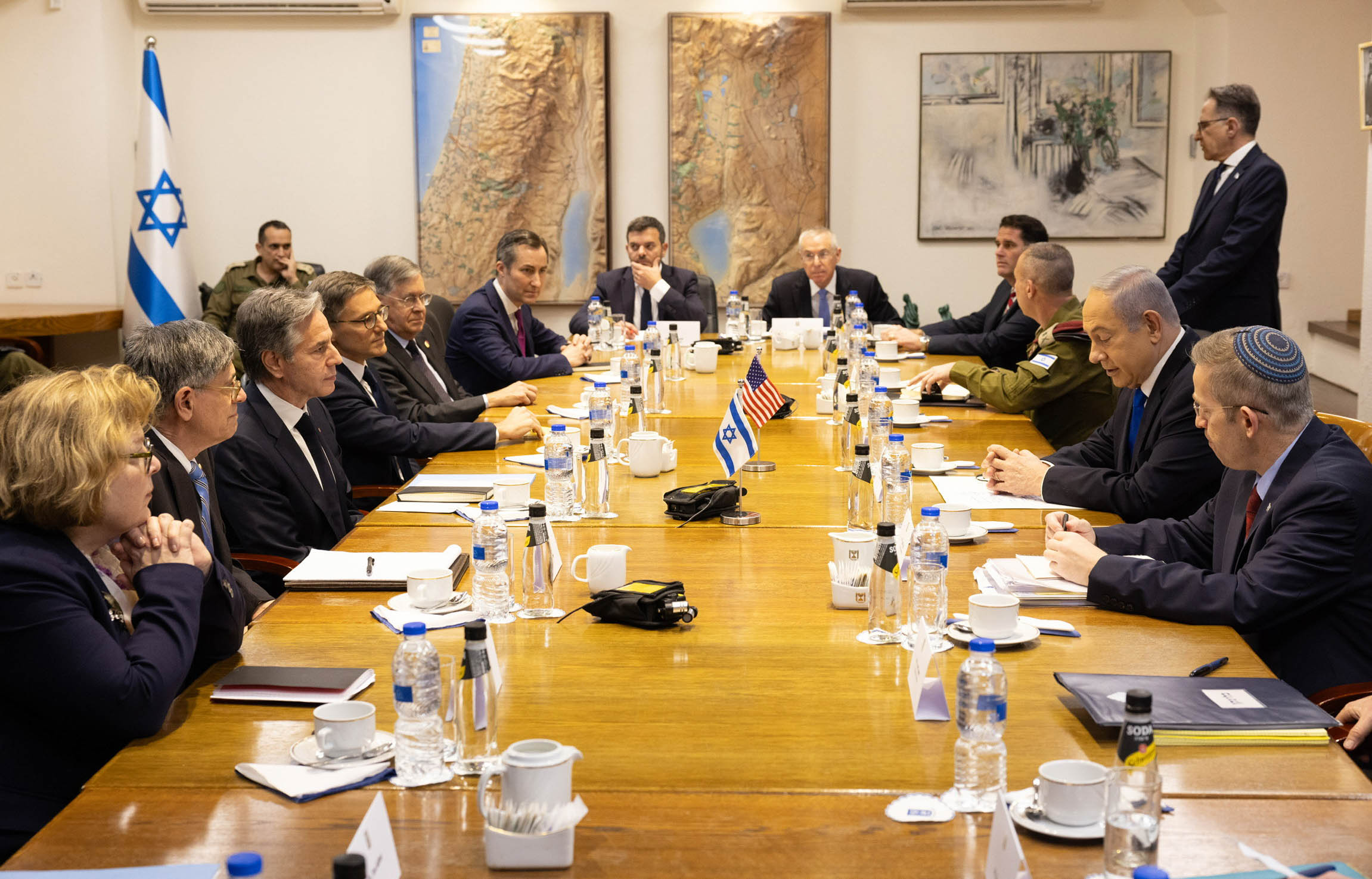
Ministers of the Israeli war cabinet meeting with Blinken, January 9, 2024

During a visit to Tel Aviv following the October 7 attacks, Blinken promised to help defend Israel "as long as America exists." Blinken said that "Israel has the right, indeed the obligation, to defend itself and to ensure that this never happens again." He rejected calls for a ceasefire in the Gaza war but said he supported "humanitarian pauses" to deliver aid to the people of the Gaza Strip. Blinken allegedly participated in Netanyahu's cabinet policy decisions on humanitarian aid, which allowed the targeting of aid convoys that could reach Hamas. Implementation of the policy resulted in assaults on UNRWA aid trucks, Palestinian police escorts for aid convoys, the World Central Kitchen aid convoy attack, and the assassination of Anera aid workers.

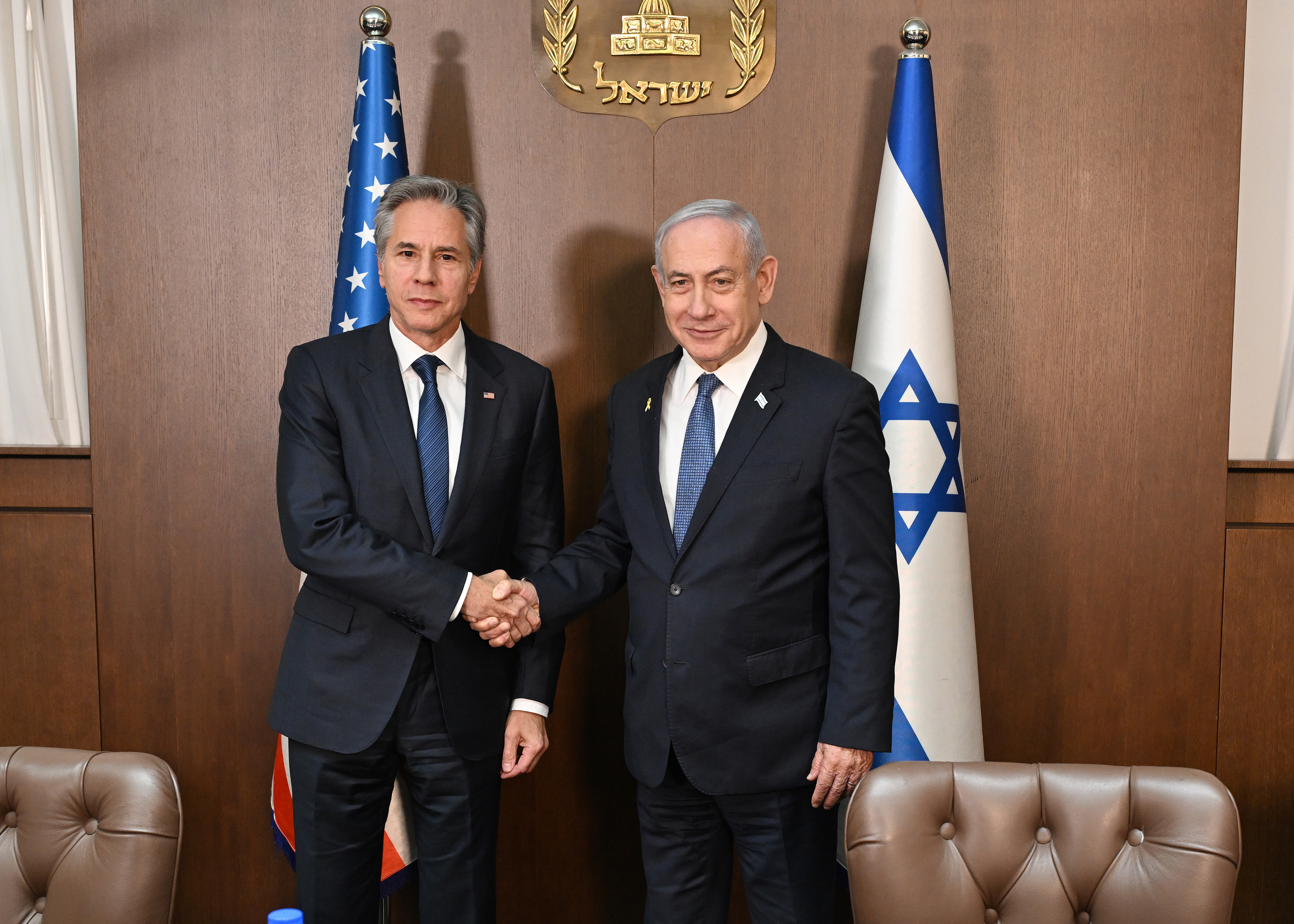
Blinken with Israeli prime minister Benjamin Netanyahu, October 22, 2024

In April 2024, it was reported that Blinken had refused to act on recommendations from the Israel Leahy Vetting Forum to sanction Israeli units that had been accused of human rights violations including torture, rape, and extrajudicial killings in the West Bank. During a hearing before the Senate Foreign Relations Committee on May 21, 2024, Blinken faced fierce criticism from protestors who interrupted his testimony by shouting as they were escorted from the hearing room, including calling him "the Butcher of Gaza" and "Bloody Blinken". A Times of Israel report found that in August 2024, Blinken falsely announced that Benjamin Netanyahu had accepted a US proposal for a hostage deal, which threw a wrench in the works and lead to the round of negotiations falling apart.

ProPublica reported on September 24, 2024, that Blinken lied to the U.S. Congress, ignoring two reports, one from the U.S. Agency for International Development (USAID), the other from State Department Refugees Bureau, that Israel had indeed blocked humanitarian aid from reaching Gaza. First-hand reports had previously shown Israelis blocking and even destroying aid on trucks.

"Their conclusion was explosive because U.S. law requires the government to cut off weapons shipments to countries that prevent the delivery of U.S.-backed humanitarian aid. Israel has been largely dependent on American bombs and other weapons in Gaza since Hamas’ Oct. 7 attacks."

Following the report, U.S. representative Rashida Tlaib and the Council on American–Islamic Relations called for Blinken's resignation.

On January 14, 2025, Blinken expressed his assessment that Hamas had recruited almost as many new members as it had lost in the Israel–Hamas war and that this was due to Benjamin Netanyahu's refusal to advance an alternative to Hamas leadership in Gaza. In that same speech, Blinken was interrupted by three protesters who reiterated the common sobriquet "Bloody Blinken" and referred to him as the "Secretary of Genocide". During his final press conference as Secretary of State, journalists Max Blumenthal and Sam Husseini were forcefully removed after asking questions about Gaza policy.

==== Europe ====
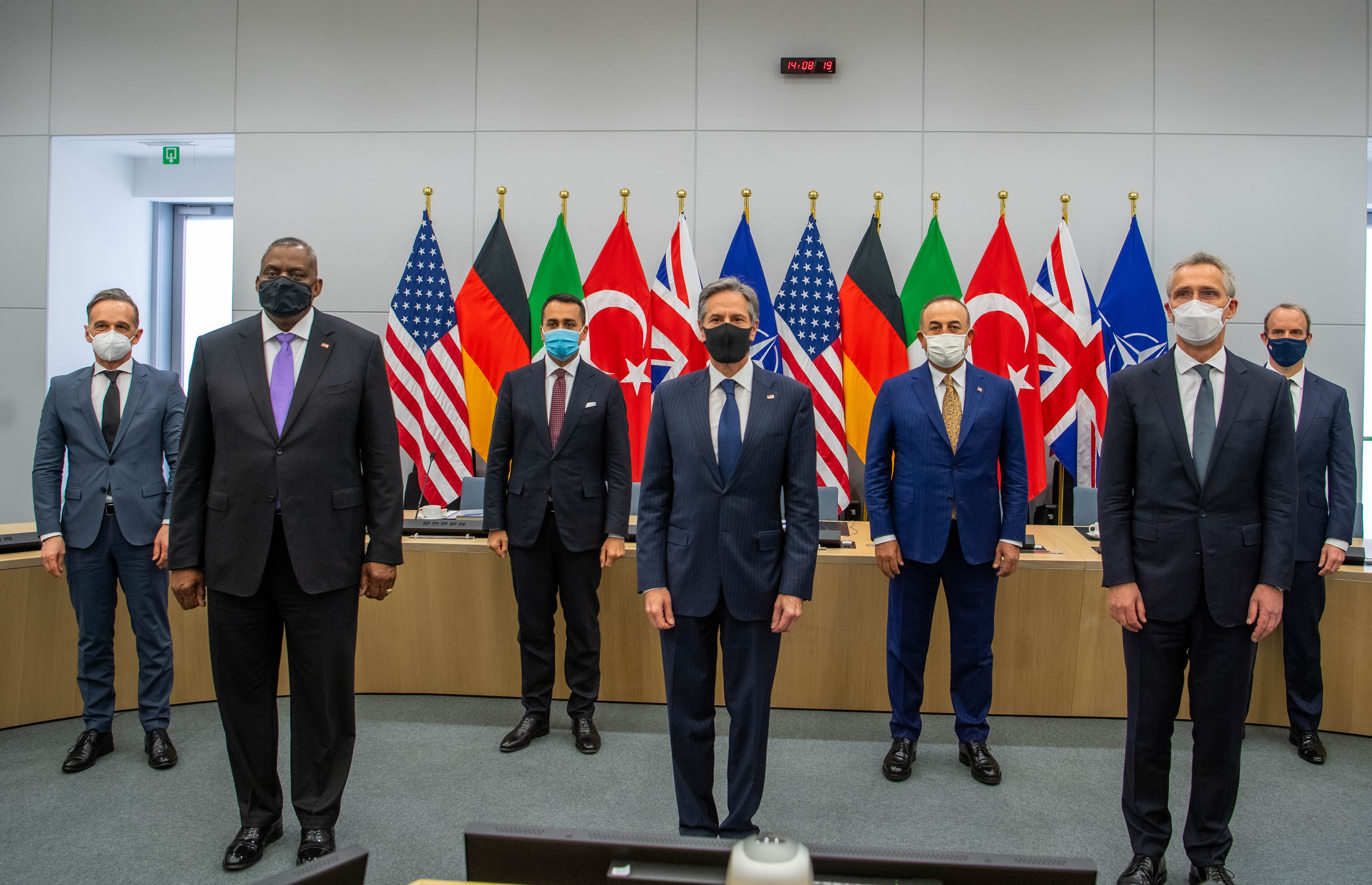
Blinken in group meeting with German FM Maas, Turkish FM Çavuşoğlu, British FM Raab, Italian FM Di Maio, NATO Secretary General Stoltenberg and U.S. Secretary of Defense Austin, April 2021

The decision to waive sanctions against Nord Stream AG and its chief executive Matthias Warnig, subsequent to the completion of the Nord Stream 2 natural gas pipeline, drew congressional criticisms. Blinken defended the action as pragmatic and practical to U.S. interests and remarked that proceeding otherwise would be counterproductive with European relations. In June 2021, Blinken traveled with Biden to attend the 47th G7 summit in Cornwall, the 31st NATO summit in Brussels, and the summit meeting with president Vladimir Putin in Geneva. Blinken and Biden both acknowledged that relations between the U.S. and Russia were at their lowest point, and a more predictable relationship remained a key priority. However, he signaled that further punitive actions would be enforced if the Russian government chose to continue with hostile activities such as interference in the 2020 presidential elections, the SolarWinds cyberattack, or the apparent poisoning and imprisonment of Alexei Navalny. Of the administration's decision to forgo a joint press conference after the summit, Blinken explained that it was "the most effective way" and "not a rare practice".

Later that month, Blinken traveled to Brussels for a NATO Ministerial with European Union counterparts to underscore the Biden administration's determination to strengthen transatlantic alliances.

In May 2021, Blinken traveled to London and Reykjavík for the G7 Foreign and Development Ministers' meeting and the Arctic Council Ministerial meeting respectively.

Blinken has been a co-chair of the Trade and Technology Council since its creation in 2021 to encourage trade relations with the European Union.

==== Russia-Ukraine war ====
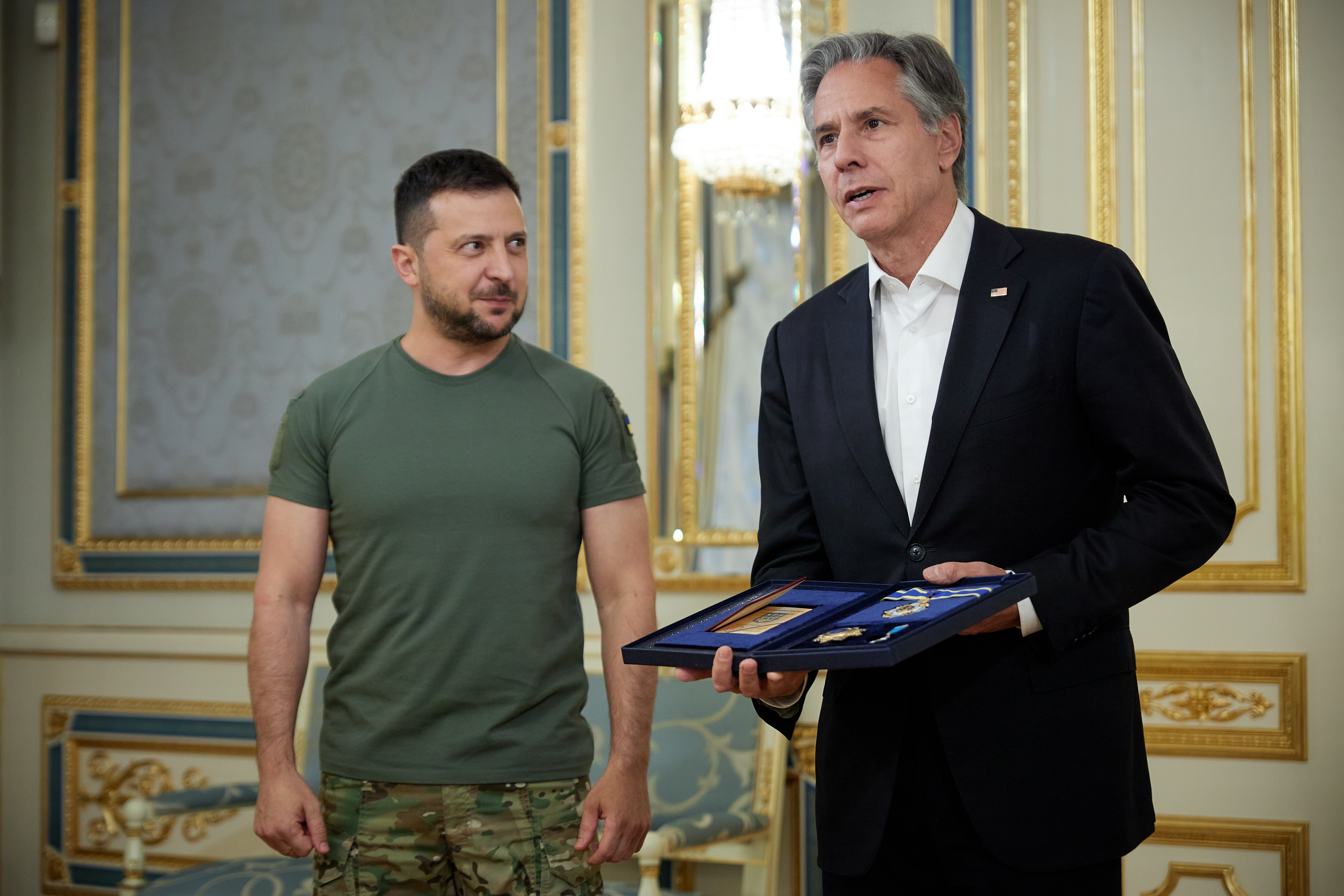
Blinken meets with Ukrainian president Volodymyr Zelenskyy in Kyiv in 2022. As Secretary of State, Blinken has been deeply involved in the American response to the Russian invasion of Ukraine.

During heightened Russia-Ukraine tensions in 2021, Blinken attended a meeting with President Volodymyr Zelenskyy and foreign minister Dmytro Kuleba in Kyiv, where Blinken reaffirmed support for Ukraine's sovereignty and territorial integrity against "Russian aggression".

In January 2022, Blinken authorized the supply of weapons to Ukraine to support the Eastern European country in amid border tensions with Russia. At a joint press availability with Ukrainian Foreign Minister Dmytro Kuleba on January 19, Blinken said "One of the principles which you've heard us repeat – but it always bears repeating – is nothing about Ukraine without Ukraine. Blinken publicly warned on February 11 of the likelihood of a Russian invasion of Ukraine prior to the end the 2022 Winter Olympics and on February 13, he said the risk was "high enough and the threat is imminent enough" that the evacuation of most staff from the U.S. Embassy in Kyiv was "the prudent thing to do". In September 2022, Blinken pledged that the United States would help the Ukrainian military retake Russian-occupied territories of Ukraine. He criticized Vladimir Putin's threats to use nuclear weapons, saying that "Russia has gotten itself into the mess that it's in is because there is no one in the [autocratic] system to effectively tell Putin he's doing the wrong thing."

Regarding the countries that decided to be neutral in the war between Russia and Ukraine, Blinken said that "It's pretty hard to be neutral when it comes to this aggression. There is a clear aggressor. There is a clear victim."

Speaking about the 2022 Russian mobilization, he said that mobilized Russian civilians were being treated as "cannon fodder that Putin is trying to throw into the war." On October 21, 2022, Blinken said the United States saw no willingness on the side of Russia to end its war in Ukraine by diplomatic means, despite American attempts. In late 2022, the US Joint Chiefs of Staff Mark Milley suggested that Ukraine should take advantage of battlefield gains in Kharkiv and Kherson to seek peace talks, however Blinken rejected this advice. Blinken questioned China's peace proposal, saying "the world should not be fooled by any tactical move by Russia, supported by China or any other country, to freeze the war on its own terms." In June 2023, he rejected any "cease-fire that simply freezes current lines in place". In July 2023, he defended Biden's decision to supply Ukraine with cluster munitions. In June 2024, Blinken said that China's support for Russia was prolonging the war in Ukraine.

==== South America ====
In 2021, Blinken spoke with the interim president of Venezuela, Juan Guaidó, whom the Biden administration continued to recognize as the country's head of state and not Nicolás Maduro.

==== Americans detained abroad ====
Blinken and the Biden administration have been criticized for the handling of Americans who are wrongfully imprisoned abroad. Families of U.S. detainees in the Middle East were upset that they were left off of a call with Secretary Blinken. In July 2022, Blinken had a meeting with Sergey Lavrov to discuss a prisoner swap to secure the release of Paul Whelan and Brittney Griner. Blinken has met with the Bring Our Families Home campaign, a coalition of families with loved ones detained abroad.

Blinken, along with the work of Special Presidential Envoy of Hostage Affairs Roger D. Carstens, has negotiated the release of over a dozen Americans wrongfully detained or held hostage abroad including Trevor Reed, Danny Fenster, Baquer Namazi, the entire Citgo Six, Osman Khan, Matthew John Heath, Mark Frerichs, and Jorge Alberto Fernández.

==== Contempt of Congress ====
On September 24, 2024, the House Foreign Affairs Committee voted to recommend Blinken be held in contempt of Congress for failing to comply with a subpoena seeking information about the 2021 U.S. withdrawal from Afghanistan. Speaker of the House Mike Johnson commented that he expected the measure would likely not be taken up for a vote until after the 2024 presidential election, although a vote was never held.

== Post-Biden administration (2025–present) ==
On January 28, 2025, Crown Publishing Group announced that Blinken had agreed to write a book on his experiences as Secretary of State.

On February 8, 2025, President Trump stated that he would be stripping Blinken's security clearance in an interview with the New York Post. The decision was later confirmed, with Trump ordering the removal of Blinken’s access to classified information. Trump also announced plans to revoke the security clearances of several other officials, including former president Joe Biden, Letitia James, Alvin Bragg, and former national security adviser Jake Sullivan.

On April 9, 2025, Blinken was interviewed by Andrew Ross Sorkin about the Tariffs in the second Trump administration, as well as other foreign policy matters.

== Foreign policy positions ==
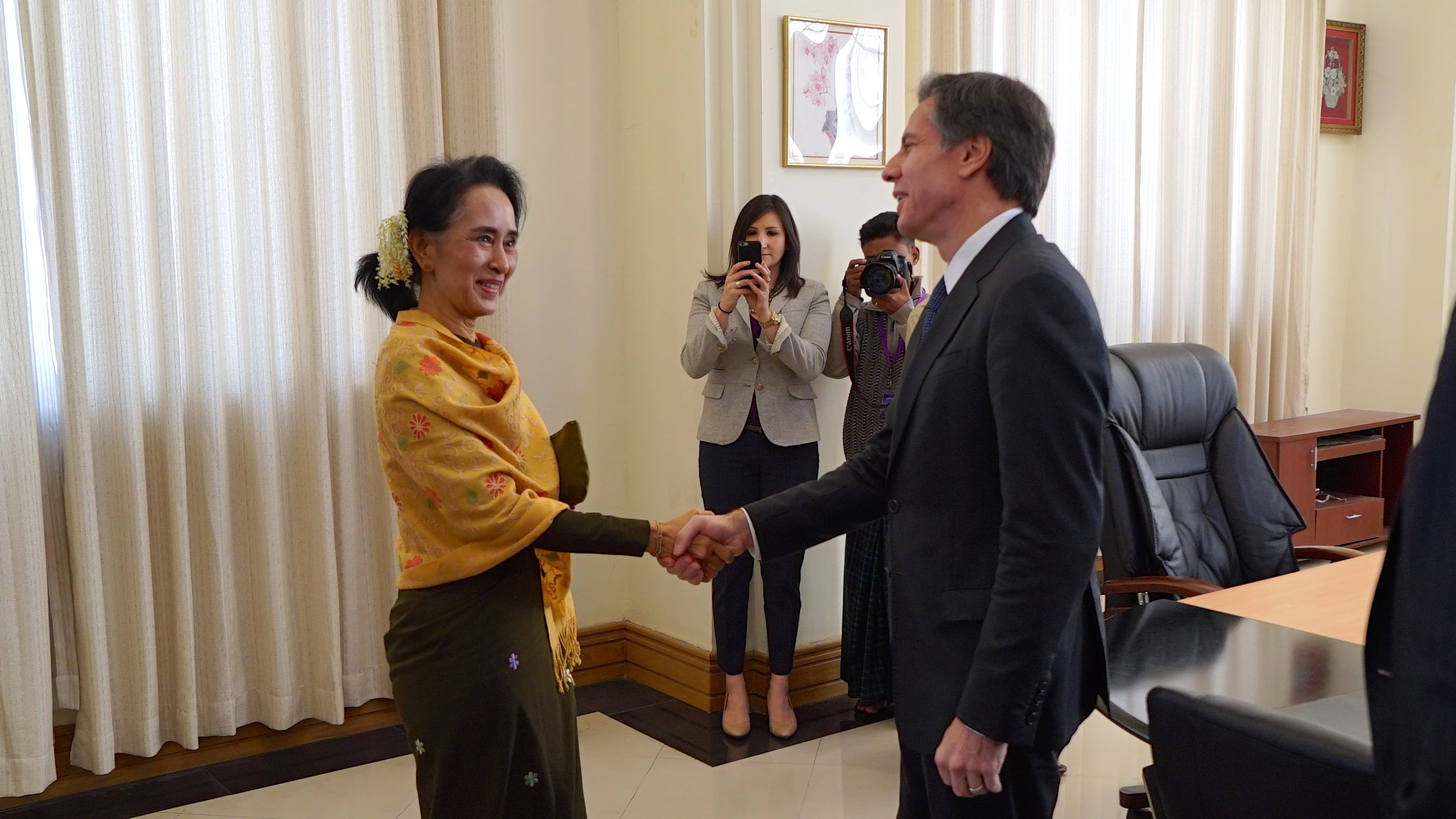
Blinken with Myanmar's leader Aung San Suu Kyi, January 18, 2016

As foreign policy advisor to then 2020 Democratic presidential nominee Joe Biden, The New York Times described Blinken as "ha[ving] Biden's ear on policy issues". The politically progressive magazine In These Times described his foreign policy positions in 2020 as "hawkish." Blinken has asserted that "[Biden] would not tie military assistance to Israel to things like annexation or other decisions by the Israeli government with which we might disagree". Blinken praised the Trump administration-brokered normalization agreements between Israel and Bahrain and the United Arab Emirates. On October 28, 2020, Blinken reaffirmed that a Biden administration will undertake strategic review of the relationship between the United States and Saudi Arabia, ensuring that it advances U.S. interests and values. In January 2021, Blinken has stated the Biden administration would keep the American embassy to Israel in Jerusalem and would seek a two-state solution to the Israeli–Palestinian conflict. Blinken is in favor of continuing non-nuclear sanctions against Iran and described it as "a strong hedge against Iranian misbehavior in other areas". He criticized former president Trump's withdrawal of the U.S. from the international nuclear agreement with Iran and expressed support for a "longer and stronger" nuclear deal. Blinken did not rule out a military intervention to stop Iran from obtaining nuclear weapons.

Blinken has been critical of the Trump administration in aiding China to advance its own key strategic goals. He stated: "[Trump] weaken[ed] American alliances, leaving a vacuum in the world for China to fill, abandoning our values and giving China a green light to trample on human rights and democracy from Xinjiang to Hong Kong". However, he also credited the former president's administration for its aggressive approach and has characterized China as a "techno-autocracy" which seeks world dominance. He indicated a desire to welcome political refugees from Hong Kong and stated that the Biden administration's commitment to Taiwan's defense would "absolutely endure", and that China's use of military force against Taiwan "would be a grievous mistake on their part". Blinken has also viewed China as committing genocide and crimes against humanity against Uyghur Muslims and other ethnic minorities in its northwestern region of Xinjiang. Blinken has characterized former president Trump's Phase One trade deal with China as "a debacle". He said it was unrealistic to "fully decouple" from China and has expressed support for "stronger economic ties with Taiwan".

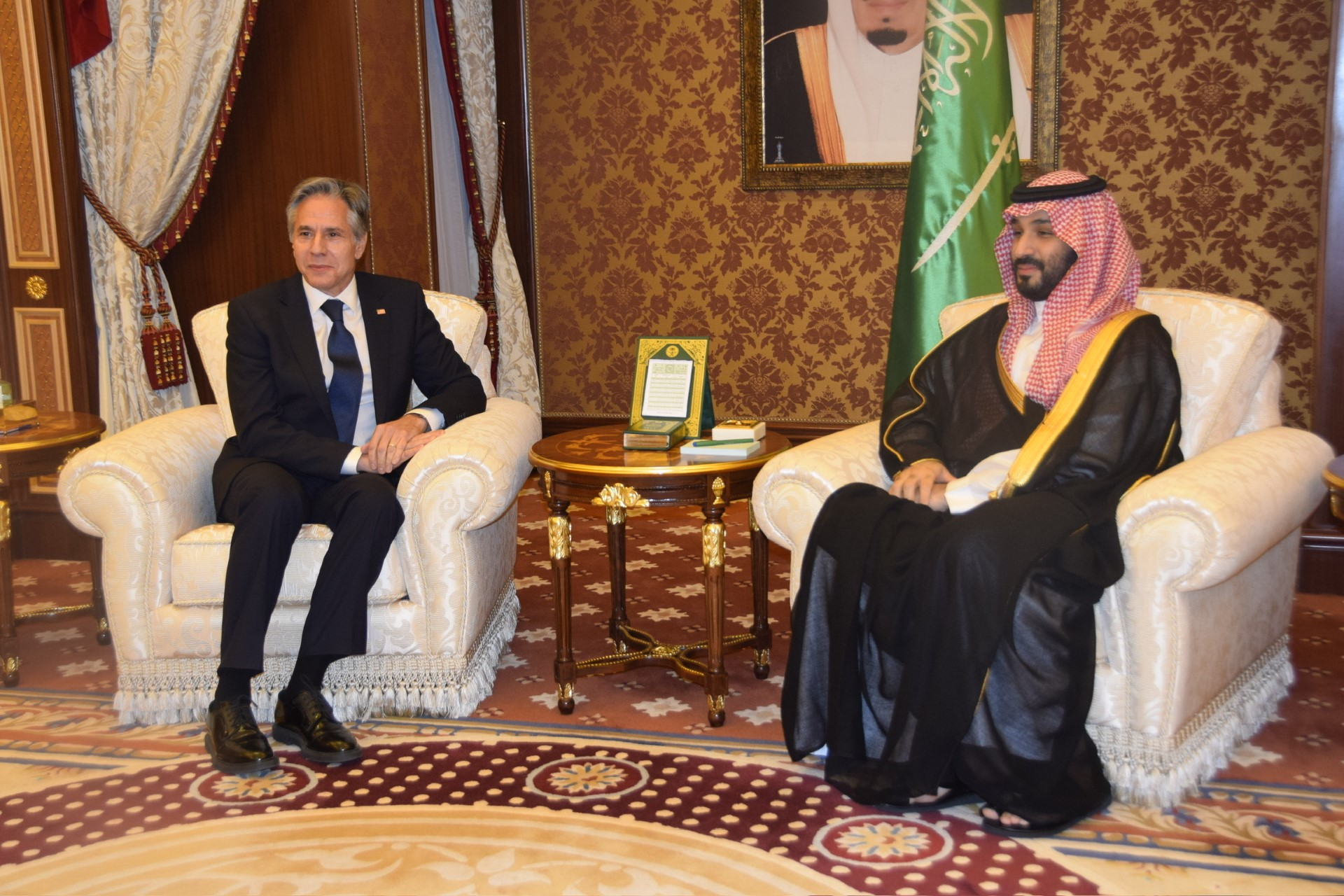
Blinken with Saudi Crown Prince Mohammed bin Salman in Jeddah, Saudi Arabia, June 7, 2023

Blinken has indicated American interest in robust ties between itself, Greece, Israel, and Cyprus regarding the Eastern Mediterranean Security and Energy Partnership Act and acknowledged the threats posed by an expansionist Turkey, which is "not acting like an ally". He opposed Turkish president Recep Tayyip Erdoğan's call for "a two-state solution in Cyprus", saying the Biden administration is committed to the reunification of Cyprus. Blinken has also suggested that he would consider sanctioning the Erdoğan administration. Blinken reaffirmed his support of keeping NATO's door open for Georgia, a country in the Caucasus, and raised the argument that NATO member countries have been more effectively shielded from "Russian aggression".

Blinken expressed his support of extending the New Strategic Arms Reduction Treaty with Russia to limit the number of deployed strategic nuclear warheads. Blinken said the Biden administration will "review" security assistance to Azerbaijan due to the 2020 Nagorno-Karabakh war between Azerbaijan and Armenia over the disputed region of Nagorno-Karabakh and voiced his support for "the provision to Armenia of security assistance".

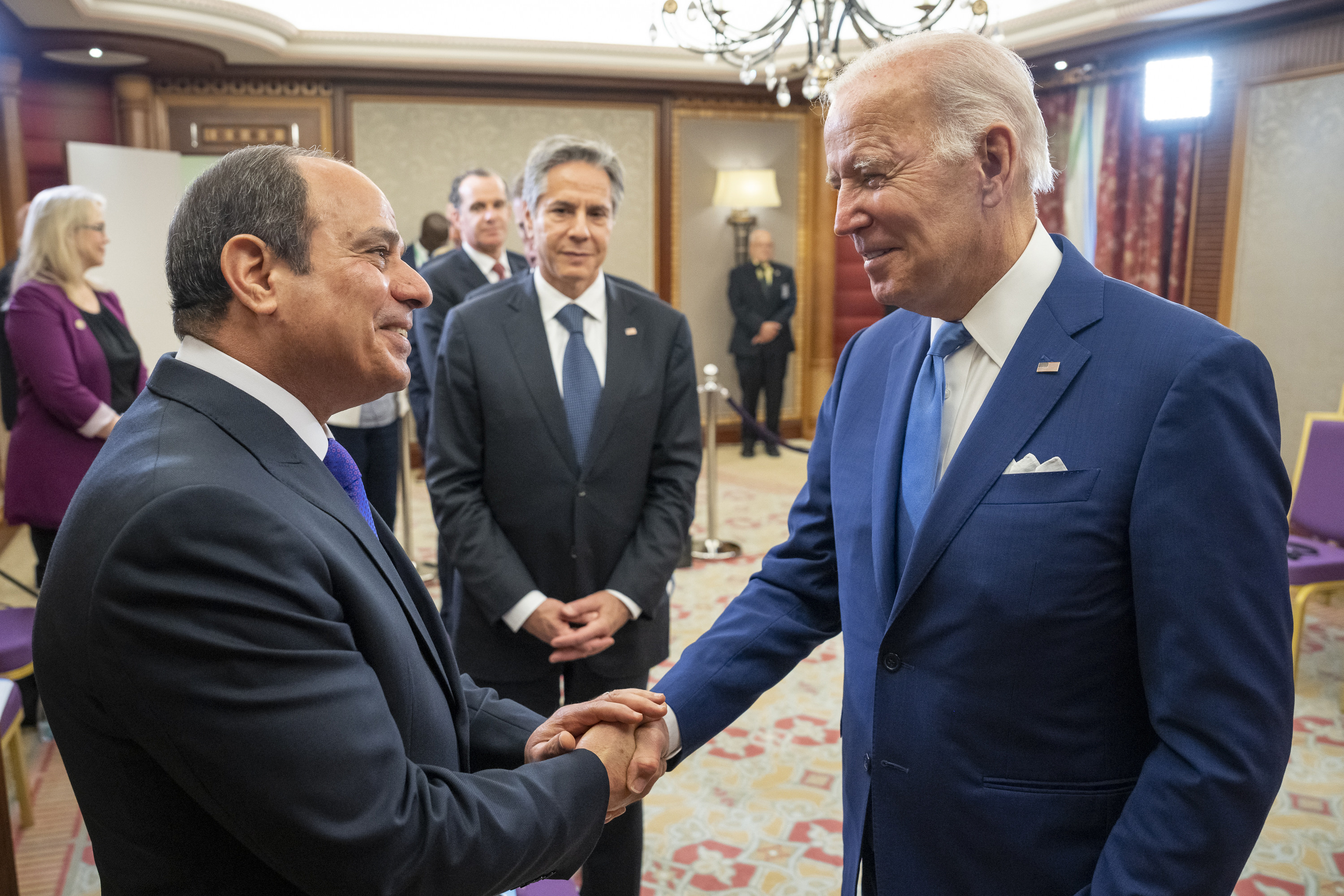
Blinken with US president Joe Biden and Egyptian president Abdel Fattah el-Sisi on July 16, 2022

Blinken opposed the United Kingdom's separation from the European Union and referred to it as a "total mess" with consequences adverse to U.S. interest. Blinken expressed concern over perceived human rights violations in Egypt under the presidency of Abdel Fattah el-Sisi. He condemned the arrest of three employees for the Egyptian Initiative for Personal Rights organization, saying that "meeting with foreign diplomats is not a crime. Nor is peacefully advocating for human rights." Referring to the re-instated Islamic Emirate of Afghanistan, declared by the Taliban following their 2021 capture of Kabul, Blinken has stated that the United States will not recognize any government that harbors terrorist groups or that does not uphold basic human rights.

During a visit to Tel Aviv following the Hamas attack on Israel, Blinken promised to help defend Israel "as long as America exists." Blinken said that "Israel has the right, indeed the obligation, to defend itself and to ensure that this never happens again." He rejected calls for a ceasefire in the Gaza war but said he supported "humanitarian pauses" to deliver aid to the people of the Gaza Strip. Supporters of the Palestinian cause established an encampment outside Blinken's home in McLean, Virginia, named 'Kibbutz Blinken.'

== Other activities ==
=== Film producing ===
During the 1990s, Blinken was briefly involved in film producing. He was an associate producer on the 1995 film The Addiction, directed by Abel Ferrara.

=== WestExec Advisors ===
In 2017, Blinken co-founded WestExec Advisors, a political strategy advising firm, with Michèle Flournoy, Sergio Aguirre, and Nitin Chadda. WestExec's clients have included Google's Jigsaw, Israeli artificial-intelligence company Windward, surveillance drone manufacturer Shield AI, which signed a $7.2 million contract with the Air Force, and "Fortune 100 types". According to Foreign Policy, the firm's clientele includes "the defense industry, private equity firms, and hedge funds". Blinken received almost $1.2 million in compensation from WestExec.

In an interview with The Intercept, Flournoy described WestExec's role as facilitating relationships between Silicon Valley firms and the Department of Defense and law enforcement; Flournoy and others compared WestExec to Kissinger Associates.

=== Pine Island Capital Partners ===
Blinken, as well as other Biden transition team members Michele Flournoy, former Pentagon advisor, and Lloyd Austin, Secretary of Defense, are partners of private equity firm Pine Island Capital Partners, a strategic partner of WestExec. Pine Island's chairman is John Thain, the final chairman of Merrill before its sale to Bank of America. Blinken went on leave from Pine Island in August 2020 to join the Biden campaign as a senior foreign policy advisor. He said he would divest himself of his equity stake in Pine Island if confirmed for a position in the Biden administration.

During the final stretch of Biden's presidential campaign, Pine Island raised $218 million for a special-purpose acquisition company, a public offering to invest in "defense, government service and aerospace industries" and COVID-19 relief, which the firm's prospectus (initially filed with the U.S. SEC in September and finalized on November 13, 2020) predicted would be profitable as the government looked to private contractors to address the pandemic. Thain said he chose the other partners because of their "access, network and expertise".

In a December 2020 New York Times article raising questions about potential conflicts of interest between WestExec principals, Pine Island advisors, including Blinken, and service in the Biden administration, critics called for full disclosure of all WestExec/Pine Island financial relationships, divestiture of ownership stakes in companies bidding on government contracts or enjoying existing contracts, and assurances that Blinken and others recuse themselves from decisions that might advantage their previous clients.

Blinken is a member of the Council on Foreign Relations and was previously a global affairs analyst for CNN.

=== Penn Biden Center ===
From 2017 to 2019, Blinken served as the managing director of the Penn Biden Center, a University of Pennsylvania think tank based in Washington. During this time he published several articles on foreign policy and the Trump administration.

== Public image ==
In general, Blinken is widely seen as a close protégé of Joe Biden and a key part of the Biden administration’s legacy. He has received praise for his role in attempting to strengthen the United States’ international partnerships, particularly with Europe and NATO allies.

Blinken has faced criticism for elements of foreign policy enacted during the Biden presidency, particularly the Afghanistan withdrawal, the lead-up to the Russian invasion of Ukraine, and Israel’s assault on Gaza in response to the October 7 attacks. Critics and detractors of Blinken have pointed to the Biden administration’s support for Israeli policy in Gaza as a violation of human rights, given that Israeli Prime Minister Benjamin Netanyahu is the subject of an International Criminal Court warrant and the International Court of Justice is investigating his government for "plausible genocide." Blinken considered working with Congress to sanction the ICC in response to these arrest warrants. (Note: The Trump administration subsequently carried out these sanctions on the ICC in October 2026)

Some State Department employees resigned in protest during Blinken’s tenure, citing the emotional burden of working under him. One official stated: “I got so tired of writing about dead kids.... Just constantly having to prove to Washington that these children actually died and then watching nothing happen.”

Activists have referred to him as “Bloody Blinken,” “The Butcher of Gaza,” and “The Secretary of Genocide,” and took the step of setting up a permanent protest camp outside his Northern Virginia home.

When asked directly in January 2025 if he worried that he had presided over what the world would see as a genocide, Blinken responded: “No. It’s not, first of all. Second, as to how the world sees it, I can’t fully answer to that. But everyone has to look at the facts and draw their own conclusions from those facts.” Subsequently, the International Association of Genocide Scholars and a UN commission both resolved that the assault on Gaza did indeed meet the legal definition of genocide.

In public opinion polling, 26% of respondents reported a favorable or very favorable opinion of Blinken, 31% had a somewhat or very unfavorable opinion, and 44% had no opinion at all in a poll conducted in December 2023.

== Personal life ==
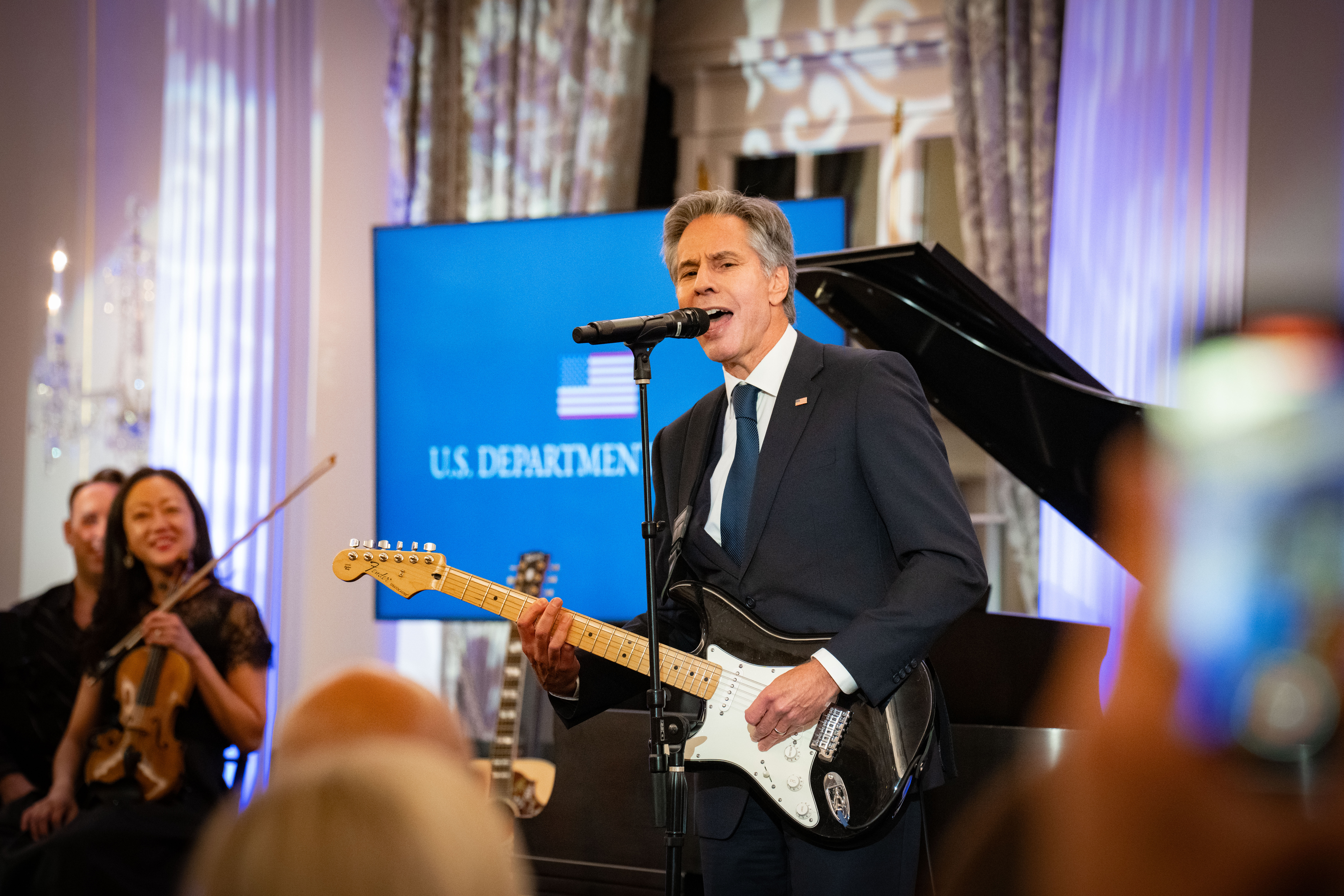
Blinken performs during the Global Music Diplomacy Initiative launch, playing left-handed on a Fender Stratocaster.

Blinken is Jewish. In 2002, Blinken and Evan Ryan were married in an interfaith ceremony officiated by a rabbi and a priest at Holy Trinity Catholic Church in Washington, D.C. They have two children. Blinken is fluent in French, and left-handed.

Blinken plays the guitar and has three songs available on Spotify by the alias Ablinken (pronounced "Abe Lincoln"). Blinken performed "Hoochie Coochie Man" by Muddy Waters in September 2023 to launch the Global Music Diplomacy Initiative at the State Department, the video of which went viral. In May 2024, he played rhythm guitar on the Neil Young song, "Rockin' in the Free World", in a bar in Kyiv, Ukraine during the first visit by a Biden administration official since the approval of U.S. supplemental funding for Ukraine's struggle against Russia.

== Honors and awards ==
=== International honors ===
Country	Date	Appointment	Ribbon	Ref.
Ukraine	2022	Second Class of the Order of Prince Yaroslav the Wise		
Sweden	2024	Commander Grand Cross of the Order of the Polar Star		
Estonia	2025	Second Class of Order of the Cross of Terra Mariana		
France	2025	Grand Officer of the National Order of the Legion of Honour		

=== Awards and recognitions ===
- Columbia Law School's Medal for Excellence (2016)
- Wash100 Award (2021)

== Publications ==
=== Articles ===
- Blinken, Antony (October 1, 2024). "America's Strategy of Renewal". Foreign Affairs.
- Blinken, Antony J. (December 2003). "From Preemption to Engagement". Survival. 45 (4): 33–60. doi:10.1080/00396330312331343576. ISSN 0039-6338. S2CID 154077314.
- Blinken, Antony J. (June 2002). "Winning the War of Ideas". The Washington Quarterly. 25 (2): 101–114. doi:10.1162/01636600252820162. ISSN 0163-660X. S2CID 154183240.
- Blinken, Antony J. (2001). "The False Crisis Over the Atlantic". Foreign Affairs. 80 (3): 35–48. doi:10.2307/20050149. JSTOR 20050149.
- Blinken, Antony J. (1987). Ally versus Ally: America, Europe, and the Siberian Pipeline Crisis. New York: Praeger. ISBN 0-275-92410-6. OCLC 14359172.

== See also ==
- List of Jewish United States Cabinet members
- Gaza genocide

== Notes ==
Political offices
Preceded by Bill Burns	United States Deputy Secretary of State; 2015–2017	Succeeded by John Sullivan
Preceded by Mike Pompeo	United States Secretary of State; 2021–2025	Succeeded by Marco Rubio
U.S. order of precedence (ceremonial)
Preceded by Mike Pompeo as Former U.S. Secretary of State	Order of precedence of the United States as Former U.S. Secretary of State	Succeeded by Carla Anderson Hills as Former U.S. Cabinet Member
