= 1990 United States House of Representatives elections in Idaho =

- November 6, 1990

All 2 Idaho seats to the United States House of Representatives
	Majority party	Minority party
Party	Democratic	Republican
Last election	1	1
Seats won	2	0
Seat change	▲1	▼1
Popular vote	183,062	131,450
Percentage	58.21%	41.79%

The 1990 United States House of Representatives elections in Idaho were held on November 6, 1990, to elect the state of Idaho's two members to the United States House of Representatives. Republican Congressman Larry Craig did not seek re-election in the 1st district, and was succeeded by Democrat Larry LaRocco, while Democratic Congressman Richard H. Stallings won re-election, giving Democrats control of both seats for the first time since the 1962 election.

== Overview ==
1990 United States House of Representatives elections in Idaho
Party	Votes	Percentage	Seats	+/–
Democratic	183,062	58.21%	2	▲1
Republican	131,450	41.79%	0	▼1
Totals	314,512	100.00%	2	—

== District 1 ==
Incumbent Republican Congressman Larry Craig ran for the U.S. Senate rather than seek re-election to a sixth term. State Senator Skip Smyser won the Republican nomination to succeed Craig unopposed, and faced stockbroker Larry LaRocco, the Democratic nominee, in the general election. LaRocco defeated Smyser, 53–47 percent, becoming the first Democrat to win the seat since 1964.

=== Republican primary ===
==== Candidates ====
- Skip Smyser, State Senator

==== Results ====
Republican primary results
Party	Candidate	Votes	%
Republican	Skip Smyser	3,961	100.00%
Total votes		3,961	100.00%

=== Democratic primary ===
==== Candidates ====
- Larry LaRocco, stockbroker
- Jeanne Givens, former State Representative, 1988 Democratic nominee for Congress
- Dick Rush, Director of the Idaho Department of Agriculture

==== Results ====
Democratic primary results
Party	Candidate	Votes	%
Democratic	Larry LaRocco	14,001	43.48%
Democratic	Jeanne Givens	10,725	33.31%
Democratic	Dick Rush	7,472	23.21%
Total votes		32,198	100.00%

=== General election ===
==== Candidates ====
- Larry LaRocco (Democratic)
- Skip Smyser (Republican)

==== Results ====
1990 Idaho's 1st congressional district general election results
Party	Candidate	Votes	%
Democratic	Larry LaRocco	85,054	53.01%
Republican	Skip Smyser	75,406	46.99%
Total votes		160,460	100.00%
Democratic gain from Republican			

== District 2 ==
Incumbent Democratic Congressman Richard H. Stallings considered running for the U.S. Senate, but opted instead to seek a fourth term. He faced a crowded field of opponents, with U.S. Army veteran Sean McDevitt narrowly winning the Republican primary over State Senator Ann Rydalch. In the general election, Stallings defeated McDevitt in a landslide, winning 64 percent of the vote.

=== Republican primary ===
==== Candidates ====
- Sean McDevitt, U.S. Army veteran
- Ann Rydalch, State Senator
- Dan Hawkley, attorney
- Janet Reid, 1988 Republican candidate for Congress

==== Results ====
Republican primary results
Party	Candidate	Votes	%
Republican	Sean McDevitt	21,608	40.86%
Republican	Ann Rydalch	19,217	36.34%
Republican	Dan Hawkley	6,410	12.12%
Republican	Janet Reid	5,645	10.68%
Total votes		52,880	100.00%

=== Democratic primary ===
==== Candidates ====
- Richard H. Stallings, incumbent U.S. Representative

==== Results ====
Democratic primary results
Party	Candidate	Votes	%
Democratic	Richard H. Stallings (inc.)	2,163	100.00%
Total votes		2,163	100.00%

=== General election ===
==== Candidates ====
- Richard Stallings (Democratic)
- Sean McDevitt (Republican)

==== Results ====
1990 Idaho's 2nd congressional district general election results
Party	Candidate	Votes	%
Democratic	Richard H. Stallings (inc.)	98,008	63.62%
Republican	Sean McDevitt	56,044	36.38%
Total votes		154,052	100.00%
Democratic hold			

== See also ==
- 1990 United States House of Representatives elections
