= 2008 United States House of Representatives elections in Idaho =

- November 4, 2008

All 2 Idaho seats to the United States House of Representatives
	Majority party	Minority party
Party	Republican	Democratic
Last election	2	0
Seats won	1	1
Seat change	▼1	▲1
Popular vote	377,464	259,776
Percentage	59.23%	40.77%
Swing	▲3.51%	▲0.94%

Republican
50–60%
60–70%
70–80%
80–90%
>90%
Democratic
50–60%
60–70%

The 2008 congressional elections in Idaho were held on November 4, 2008 to determine who would represent the state of Idaho in the United States House of Representatives, coinciding with the presidential and senatorial elections. Representatives are elected for two-year terms; those elected were to serve in the 111th Congress from January 3, 2009 until January 3, 2011.

Idaho has two seats in the House, apportioned according to the 2000 United States census. Representatives are elected for two-year terms. Its 2007–09 congressional delegation consisted of two Republicans. In the 2008 elections, District 1 was won by Democrat Walt Minnick, so Idaho's delegation to the 111th Congress consisted of one Republican and one Democrat. CQ Politics had forecasted District 1 to be at some risk for the incumbent party. As of 2024, this was the only time since 1992 that a Democrat was elected to congress from Idaho. Primary elections were held May 27, 2008.

== Overview ==
United States House of Representatives elections in Idaho, 2008
Party	Votes	Percentage	Seats before	Seats after	+/–
Republican	377,464	59.23%	2	1	-1
Democratic	259,776	40.77%	0	1	+1
Valid votes	-	-%			
Invalid or blank votes	-	-%			
Totals	637,240	100.00%	2	2	—
Voter turnout	-%				

=== Match-up summary ===
District	Incumbent	2008 status	Democratic	Republican	Other party
1	Bill Sali	Lost Re-election	Walt Minnick	Bill Sali	
2	Mike Simpson	Re-election	Debbie Holmes	Mike Simpson	

== District 1 ==
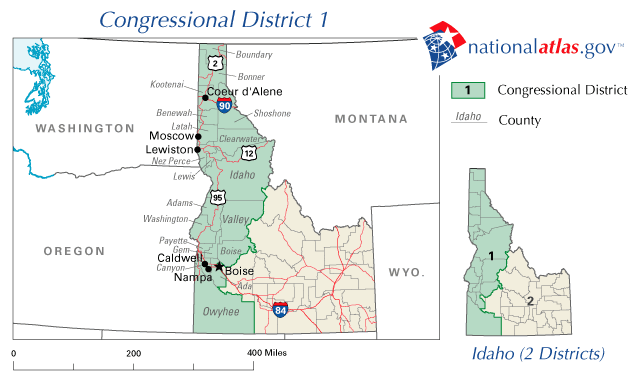

2008 Idaho's 1st congressional district election
- November 4, 2008
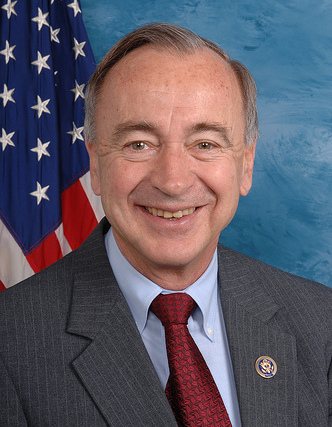

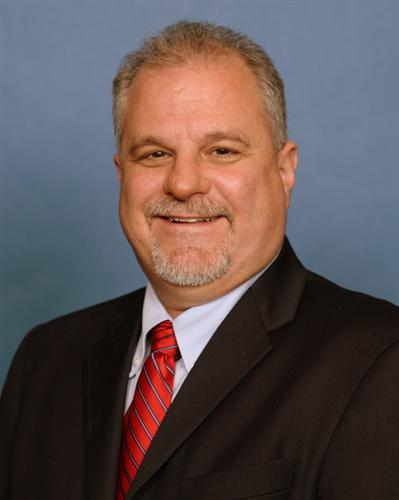
Nominee	Walt Minnick	Bill Sali
Party	Democratic	Republican
Popular vote	175,898	171,687
Percentage	50.6%	49.4%
- Minnick: 50–60% 60–70% 70–80% 80–90% Sali: 50–60% 60–70% 70–80% 80–90% Tie: 50%
U.S. Representative before election
Bill Sali
Republican
Elected U.S. Representative
Walt Minnick
Democratic

This district includes most of the Boise metropolitan area and northern Idaho, including all of the Idaho Panhandle. Major cities in the district include Nampa, Meridian, Coeur d'Alene, and Lewiston as well as precincts in western Boise. Usually a Republican stronghold, in 2006 Bill Sali (campaign website) won an open seat race with only 50 percent of the vote over Larry Grant's 45 percent.

In 2008 Sali faced Walt Minnick (campaign website), a businessman and former White House staffer who had been the unsuccessful Democratic nominee for the U.S. Senate in 1996. Grant announced his intention to run for the seat again, but withdrew from the race before the primary and endorsed Minnick instead. Sali defeated Iraq war veteran Matt Salisbury with 60 percent of the vote in the May 27 Republican primary. Minnick won the Democratic nomination unopposed.

Initially, Sali was considered safe due to the district's heavily Republican nature (CPVI R+19), and the race was initially rated 'Safe Republican' by the non-partisan Cook Political Report. However, it soon became increasingly competitive. According to The Wall Street Journal, a combination of poor fund raising (Sali trailed Minnick by nearly $200,000 according to reports in May) and Sali's combative reputation gave Minnick a chance to upset Sali despite the district's conservative majority. Many moderates who would have normally leaned Republican were reportedly concerned by Sali's far-right social views in a state where conservative voters have historically cared more about small government issues than social issues.

As a result, the Cook Political Report adjusted its rating for the race throughout the campaign, moving it to 'Likely Republican' on July 3, 'Leans Republican' on September 18, and 'Republican Toss Up' on October 23. CQ Politics forecasted the race as 'Republican Favored', but changed its rating to 'No Clear Favorite' late in the campaign. The Rothenberg Report rated it as 'Lean Republican'.

- Race ranking and details from CQ Politics
- Campaign contributions from OpenSecrets
- 2008 Idaho CD-01 graph of collected polls at Pollster.com

=== Predictions ===
Source	Ranking	As of
The Cook Political Report	Lean D (flip)	November 6, 2008
Rothenberg	Tilt D (flip)	November 2, 2008
Sabato's Crystal Ball	Lean D (flip)	November 6, 2008
Real Clear Politics	Tossup	November 7, 2008
CQ Politics	Tossup	November 6, 2008

=== Results ===
Minnick defeated Sali by just 4,211 votes. Minnick was the first Democrat to be elected to Congress from Idaho since Larry LaRocco was defeated for reelection to this seat in 1994; he was only the second Democrat to hold the seat since the 1960s. According to CPVI, as calculated using the 2004 and 2008 presidential election results, Idaho's first district was the third most Republican-leaning district in the country to be represented by a Democrat in the 111th Congress.

Idaho's 1st congressional district election, 2008
Party	Candidate	Votes	%
Democratic	Walt Minnick	175,898	50.6
Republican	Bill Sali (incumbent)	171,687	49.4
Total votes		347,585	100.00
Democratic gain from Republican			

== District 2 ==
2008 Idaho's 2nd congressional district election
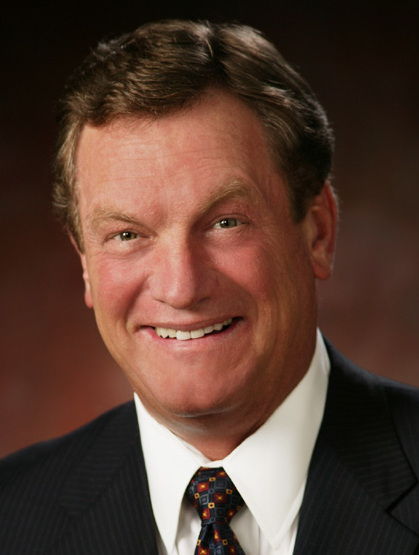

Nominee	Mike Simpson	Debbie Holmes
Party	Republican	Democratic
Popular vote	205,777	83,878
Percentage	71.0%	29.0%
- Simpson: 50–60% 60–70% 70–80% 80–90% 90–100% Martinez 50–60% 60–70% Tie: 50%
U.S. Representatives before election
Mike Simpson
Republican
Elected U.S. Representatives
Mike Simpson
Republican

This district includes the Eastern Idaho and Magic Valley regions of Idaho, including the cities of Pocatello, Idaho Falls and Twin Falls, as well as parts of Boise on its western edge. The seat was held by Republican Mike Simpson, who was first elected in 1998.

Simpson (campaign website) ran for reelection against Democratic nominee Deborah Holmes (campaign website), a first-time candidate for public office. Both Simpson and Holmes decisively won their respective primaries. Although parts of the district had trended Democratic in recent years, including Blaine County, Teton County and the Boise precincts located in the district, a strong Mormon voting bloc kept the district in Republican hands. CQ Politics forecast the race as 'Safe Republican'.

- Race ranking and details from CQ Politics
- Campaign contributions from OpenSecrets

=== Predictions ===
Source	Ranking	As of
The Cook Political Report	Safe R	November 6, 2008
Rothenberg	Safe R	November 2, 2008
Sabato's Crystal Ball	Safe R	November 6, 2008
Real Clear Politics	Safe R	November 7, 2008
CQ Politics	Safe R	November 6, 2008

=== Results ===
Mike Simpson easily won reelection over Deborah Holmes, receiving 71 percent of the vote.

Idaho's 2nd congressional district election, 2008
Party	Candidate	Votes	%
Republican	Mike Simpson (incumbent)	205,777	71.0
Democratic	Deborah Holmes	83,878	29.0
Total votes		289,655	100.00
Republican hold			
