= Bill Sali =

American politician (born 1954)

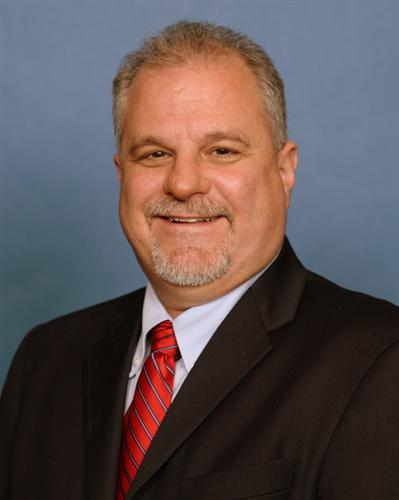

Member of the U.S. House of Representatives from Idaho's 1st district
- In office January 3, 2007 – January 3, 2009
- Preceded by: Butch Otter
- Succeeded by: Walt Minnick

Member of the Idaho House of Representatives
- In office August 1990 – November 30, 2006
- Preceded by: Jerry Deckard
- Succeeded by: John Vander Woude
- Constituency: 14th district Seat B (1990–1992); 18th district Seat A (1992–2002); 21st district Seat A (2002–2006)

Personal details
- Born: William Thomas Sali; February 17, 1954 (age 72) Portsmouth, Ohio, U.S.
- Party: Republican
- Spouse: Terry Sali
- Children: 6
- Education: Boise State University (BBA); University of Idaho (JD)

William Thomas Sali (born February 17, 1954) is an American lawyer and politician who served as a congressman from Idaho. A Republican, he served a single term in the United States House of Representatives, representing Idaho's 1st congressional district from 2007 to 2009. Sali previously served in the Idaho Legislature as a member of the House.

Sali was elected to an open seat in Congress in 2006. He was defeated for reelection in 2008 by Democrat Walt Minnick. Sali was the first Idaho congressman to fail to win a second term in 56 years, since Republican John Travers Wood was defeated in 1952. Minnick also served only one term before being defeated by Raúl Labrador in 2010.

== Early life and education ==
Born in Portsmouth, Ohio, Sali moved to Idaho with his family in 1962 at age ten. He graduated from Capital High School in Boise in 1972 and enrolled at Boise State College, attending for two years. Sali worked full-time for over four years, then returned to the renamed Boise State University in 1979, and earned a Bachelor of Business Administration in 1981 at age 29. He was admitted to the University of Idaho law school in Moscow, where he received a Juris Doctor in 1984.

== Early career ==
Sali was first elected to the Idaho House of Representatives in 1990. There, he gained a reputation as a staunch conservative on social and economic issues, frequently drawing the ire of the more moderate Republican house leadership.

Sali served as vice-chairman of the state House Health and Welfare Committee and as Chairman of the Special Committee on Health Care. He also sat on the Commerce, Industry and Tourism Committee, the Human Resources Committees, and the Judiciary, Rules, and Administration Committee.

== U.S. House of Representatives ==
=== Elections ===
2006

On May 23, 2006, Sali won the Republican nomination in Idaho's 1st congressional district with 26 percent of the vote in a six-way race. The seat came open when three-term incumbent Butch Otter gave it up to make a successful run for governor. Sali's opponent in the general election campaign was Democrat Larry Grant.

Over the years, Sali had been involved in disputes with some prominent Idaho Republicans, including former Idaho House speaker Bruce Newcomb and 2nd district congressman Mike Simpson. Despite past arguments, the Idaho Republican Party and Republican Party came out in support of Sali's candidacy. Vice President Dick Cheney, RNC Chairman Ken Mehlman, and then Speaker of the House Dennis Hastert all came to Idaho to support Sali, and his campaign received substantial financial backing from the Club for Growth, the Republican National Committee, and the National Right to Life PAC.

Sali was elected to Congress on November 7, 2006, defeating Grant by 11,908 votes. He was likely helped by coattails from Otter's gubernatorial bid; Otter won all but two counties in the district.

2008

Sali sought reelection to the House in 2008. He defeated Iraq War veteran Matthew Salisbury in the May 2008 Republican primary, but was defeated by Democratic challenger Walt Minnick in the general election. Minnick defeated Sali by 4,211 votes, becoming the first Democrat to win a congressional election in Idaho in 16 years (Larry LaRocco was reelected in 1992). While Sali carried 11 of the district's 19 counties, he could not overcome a 5,000-vote deficit in Ada County (home to both Sali and Minnick), which accounts for nearly two-thirds of the district's population.

=== Tenure ===
Sali was elected president of the 2007–08 Republican freshman class.

=== Political positions ===
==== State Children's Health Insurance Program (SCHIP) ====
In 2007, Congress took up the reauthorization of the State Children's Health Insurance Program, which provides health care for about 6 million children and 670,000 adults from families who earn too much money to qualify for Medicare but not enough to afford health insurance. Congressional Democrats and many Republicans tried to use the opportunity to dramatically expand the program but were opposed by President George W. Bush and other Republicans. In 2006, 5.4 million children were eligible but not enrolled in SCHIP or Medicaid and 9.4 million total children were uninsured.

Bill Sali voted against the first House bill, which passed along party lines.

==== Minimum wage ====
He opposed legislation to raise the minimum wage to $7.25 per hour, as well as a Republican motion to recommit. He argued that a minimum wage violates the "natural laws" of the free market, and to make his point he (facetiously) proposed the "Obesity Reduction and Health Promotion Act" which would mandate a 10% reduction in the force of gravity.

==== Iraq War ====
Sali has consistently voted to support the Iraq War and has opposed all legislation aimed at withdrawing the United States' troops from Iraq.

Sali said, "None of us like war. We all wish that victory in Iraq had been swift, clear-cut and definitive and that a stable and free government would have been operating in Baghdad, able to stand on its own. Clearly great progress has been made, particularly in the past year, and the future of Iraq is now more promising than ever. Yet, we remain at war. At a minimum, we owe it to our soldiers and to our national security to win this war by supporting those in the field. Only by doing so can we bring our soldiers safely home."

==== Immigration reform ====
Sali was a member of the House Immigration Reform Caucus and opposed President Bush's proposal for comprehensive immigration policy reform. "Amnesty does nothing to secure our borders," Sali said.

==== Other legislative action ====
In July 2007, Sali introduced legislation allowing for separate votes on bills that contain multiple subjects. Sali based his proposal on his experience in the Idaho Legislature, noting that Idaho's constitution forbids grouping unrelated projects in a single bill. "Frankly, the process [in the Idaho Legislature] is an orderly process, and while it is political it is somewhat predictable," Sali told the Idaho Statesman. "Congress is a whole other deal."

In August 2007, Sali introduced his second proposal to reform Congress. That bill called for Congress to make available a "red-line" version of legislation so that congressional representatives and the general public can easily see what is being added and removed from a statute.

Sali told the Spokane, WA based Spokesman Review newspaper that there are other areas in Congress that need to be reformed. He said congressional committees hold hearings on topics, not on legislation, and often it's not clear why a hearing was called in the first place. "For a member of Congress to try and discern what is the takeaway message from these people who actually do have to testify in front of us can be very difficult," Sali said. "Too often the hearings end up being nothing more than a photo opportunity for people," he said. "If that sounds goofy to you, it's only because it is."

In 2006, Sali linked abortion to breast cancer. The National Cancer Institute has said there is no known link between the two.

=== Anti-multiculturalism views ===
In August 2007, Sali expressed concerns over what he perceived as a deterioration of the "Christian heritage" of the United States and the rise of multiculturalism in U.S. politics—largely with reference to the 2006 election of Keith Ellison, the first Muslim member of the U.S. House of Representatives, and to the Hindu prayer offered by Rajan Zed during the opening of the U.S. Senate on July 12, 2007. Sali said these events were "not what was envisioned by the Founding Fathers" and said that America was founded on Christian principles.

Speaking with the Idaho Press-Tribune, Sali explained his view that multiculturalism is in conflict with the national motto "E Pluribus Unum," or "out of many, one." Sali said multiculturalism would mean "out of the many, the many." "The question is, is multiculturalism good or not?" Sali said. "I don’t think the Founding Fathers were multicultural. Multiculturalism is the antithesis of (the motto)." In regard to the view that the nation was founded on Christian principles, Sali said, "If we’re going to move away from those principles ... we better consider the blessings of God that have been bestowed on this country and the protective hand of God that’s been over this country."

In another interview, Sali said, "The idea that somehow we can move to multiculturalism and still remain the same – I think that's a little dangerous, too." "From my standpoint, I believe the Founding Fathers were overwhelmingly Christian and the God they were talking about is the God of the Bible."

Sali was accused by some of wanting to impose a religious test for elected officials, but his spokesman said that Sali had no such intention. In an interview with the Idaho Statesman, Sali said of Ellison, "He got elected the same way I did. People certainly have the right to elect anyone they want." Sali also denied that he wanted a religious test for office, citing the No Religious Test Clause of the Constitution. But Sali said he was opposed to multiculturalism in the U.S. government, saying, "Our nation was founded on principles that the founders took largely from Scripture. Those principles provide the basis for our form of government and are the source of the rights we enjoy as Americans."

=== Committee assignments ===
- Committee on Natural Resources
  - Subcommittee on Energy and Mineral Resources
  - Subcommittee on Fisheries, Wildlife and Oceans
  - Subcommittee on National Parks, Forests and Public Lands
- Committee on Oversight and Government Reform
  - Information Policy, Census and National Archives Subcommittee

== Electoral history ==
Idaho's 1st Congressional District Election (2006)
Party	Candidate	Votes	%
Republican	Bill Sali	115,843	49.94
Democratic	Larry Grant	103,935	44.81
Independent	Dave Olson	6,857	2.96
Natural Law	Andy Hedden-Nicely	2,882	1.24
Constitution	Paul Smith	2,457	1.06
Total votes		231,974	100.00
Turnout			
Republican hold			

Idaho's 1st Congressional District Election (2008)
Party	Candidate	Votes	%
Democratic	Walt Minnick	175,898	50.61
Republican	Bill Sali (Incumbent)	171,687	49.39
Total votes		347,585	100.00
Turnout			
Democratic gain from Republican			

== Personal life ==
Sali and his wife, Terry, reside in Kuna, southwest of Boise. Married since 1976, they have six adult children.

U.S. House of Representatives
Preceded by Butch Otter	Member of the U.S. House of Representatives from Idaho's 1st congressional district 2007–2009	Succeeded by Walt Minnick
U.S. order of precedence (ceremonial)
Preceded by Randy Tate as Former U.S. Representative	Order of precedence of the United States as Former U.S. Representative	Succeeded by Walt Minnick as Former U.S. Representative
