= 2006 United States House of Representatives elections in Idaho =

- November 7, 2006

All 2 Idaho seats to the United States House of Representatives
	Majority party	Minority party
Party	Republican	Democratic
Last election	2	0
Seats won	2	0
Seat change	Steady	Steady
Popular vote	248,105	177,376
Percentage	55.72%	39.83%

Republican
40–50%
50–60%
60–70%
70–80%
80–90%
Democratic
40–50%
50–60%

The 2006 congressional elections in Idaho were held on November 7, 2006, and determined who would represent the state of Idaho in the United States House of Representatives. Idaho has two seats in the House, apportioned according to the 2000 United States census. Representatives are elected for two-year terms; the winners served in the 110th Congress from January 3, 2007 until January 3, 2009.

== Overview ==
United States House of Representatives elections in Idaho, 2006
Party	Votes	Percentage	Seats	+/–
Republican	248,105	55.72%	2	—
Democratic	177,376	39.83%	0	—
Independent	11,970	2.69%	0	—
Constitution	4,973	1.12%	0	—
Natural Law	2,882	0.65%	0	—
Totals	445,306	100.00%	2	—

== District 1 ==
2006 Idaho's 1st congressional district election
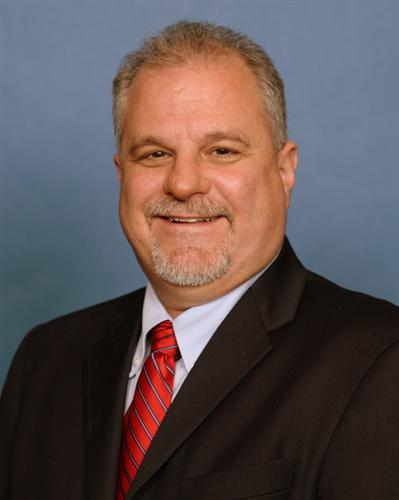

Nominee	Bill Sali	Larry Grant
Party	Republican	Democratic
Popular vote	115,843	103,935
Percentage	49.9%	44.8%
- Sali: 40–50% 50–60% 60–70% 70–80% >90% Grant: 40–50% 50–60% 60–70% 70–80% >90% Tie: 40–50% No votes
U.S. Representatives before election
Butch Otter
Republican
Elected U.S. Representatives
Bill Sali
Republican

This district encompasses the Idaho Panhandle region and most of the Boise metropolitan area.

In the May 23 primary, conservative state Representative Bill Sali edged out a crowded field to win the Republican nomination with 26%, while Larry Grant won the Democratic nomination. Sali is a controversial figure in Idaho politics who clashed repeatedly with Republican leadership in the Idaho Legislature. Some of Sali's Republican detractors publicly said that they would back Grant in the general election. All this gave Grant a boost in the general election, but Sali remained favored given the GOP tilt of the area and the popular Otter at the top of the ticket. Grant made gains late in the campaign, but Sali held on to win.

=== Republican primary ===
==== Candidates ====
- Bill Sali, Idaho State Representative
- Robert Vasquez, Canyon County Commissioner
- Sheila Sorensen, Idaho State Senator
- Keith Johnson, Idaho State Controller
- Norm Semanko, attorney
- Skip Brandt, Idaho State Senator

==== Results ====
Republican primary results
Party	Candidate	Votes	%
Republican	Bill Sali	18,985	25.82
Republican	Robert Vasquez	13,624	18.53
Republican	Sheila Sorensen	13,472	18.32
Republican	Keith Johnson	13,186	17.93
Republican	Norm Semanko	7,976	10.85
Republican	Skip Brandt	6,289	8.55
Total votes		73,532	100.00

=== Democratic primary ===
- Larry Grant, attorney
- Cecil Kelly III, small business owner

==== Results ====
Democratic Party primary results
Party	Candidate	Votes	%
Democratic	Larry Grant	10,885	74.78
Democratic	Cecil Kelly III	3,671	25.22
Total votes		14,556	100.00

=== General election ===
==== Predictions ====
Source	Ranking	As of
The Cook Political Report	Tossup	November 6, 2006
Rothenberg	Tilt R	November 6, 2006
Sabato's Crystal Ball	Tilt D (flip)	November 6, 2006
Real Clear Politics	Lean R	November 7, 2006
CQ Politics	Lean R	November 7, 2006

==== Results ====
Idaho's 1st congressional district election, 2006
Party	Candidate	Votes	%
Republican	Bill Sali	115,843	49.94
Democratic	Larry Grant	103,935	44.80
Independent	Dave Olson	6,857	2.96
Natural Law	Andy Hedden-Nicely	2,882	1.24
Constitution	Paul Smith	2,457	1.06
Total votes		231,974	100.00
Republican hold			

== District 2 ==
2006 Idaho's 2nd congressional district election
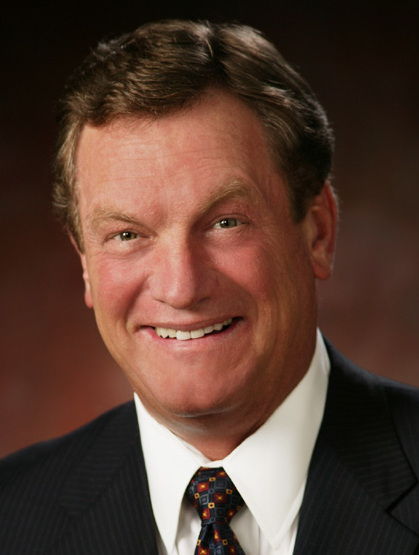

Nominee	Mike Simpson	Jim Hansen
Party	Republican	Democratic
Popular vote	132,262	73,441
Percentage	62.0%	34.4%
- Simpson: 40–50% 50–60% 60–70% 70–80% 80–90% >90% Hansen: 40–50% 50–60% 60–70% 70–80% Hedrick: >90% No votes
U.S. Representatives before election
Mike Simpson
Republican
Elected U.S. Representatives
Mike Simpson
Republican

This district encompasses Eastern Idaho, the Magic Valley, and most of the city of Boise. Republican incumbent Michael Simpson, who has never faced much electoral difficulty, defeated Democratic nominee Jim Hansen in the general election, along with several independent candidates.

=== Predictions ===
Source	Ranking	As of
The Cook Political Report	Safe R	November 6, 2006
Rothenberg	Safe R	November 6, 2006
Sabato's Crystal Ball	Safe R	November 6, 2006
Real Clear Politics	Safe R	November 7, 2006
CQ Politics	Safe R	November 7, 2006

=== Results ===
Idaho's 2nd congressional district election, 2008
Party	Candidate	Votes	%
Republican	Michael Simpson (incumbent)	132,262	62.00
Democratic	Jim Hansen	73,441	34.43
Independent	Cameron Forth	5,113	2.40
Constitution	Travis J. Hedrick	2,516	1.18
Total votes		213,332	100.00
Republican hold			
