= 1988 United States House of Representatives elections in Idaho =

- November 8, 1988

All 2 Idaho seats to the United States House of Representatives
	Majority party	Minority party
Party	Republican	Democratic
Last election	1	1
Seats won	1	1
Seat change	Steady	Steady
Popular vote	203,447	198,284
Percentage	49.93%	48.67%

The 1988 United States House of Representatives elections in Idaho were held on November 8, 1988, to elect the state of Idaho's two members to the United States House of Representatives. In the 1st district, Republican Congressman Larry Craig defeated Democratic State Representative Jeanne Givens to win a fifth term, while in the 2nd district, Democratic Congressman Richard H. Stallings defeated former State Senator Dane Watkins, the Republican nominee, to win re-election to a third term.

== Overview ==
1988 United States House of Representatives elections in Idaho
Party	Votes	Percentage	Seats	+/–
Republican	203,447	49.93%	1	Steady
Democratic	198,284	48.67%	1	Steady
Libertarian	5,703	1.40%	0	—
Totals	407,434	100.00%	2	—

== District 1 ==
Incumbent Republican Congressman Larry Craig ran for re-election to a fifth term. He was unopposed in the Republican primary and faced State Representative Jeanne Givens, the Democratic nominee, in the general election. Craig won re-election in a landslide, receiving 66 percent of the vote to Givens's 34 percent.

=== Republican primary ===
==== Candidates ====
- Larry Craig, incumbent U.S. Representative

==== Results ====
Republican primary results
Party	Candidate	Votes	%
Republican	Larry Craig (inc.)	29,289	100.00%
Total votes		29,289	100.00%

=== Democratic primary ===
==== Candidates ====
- Jeanne Givens, State Representative
- David Shepherd, developer, 1986 independent candidate for Congress
- Bruce Robinson, attorney

==== Results ====
Democratic primary results
Party	Candidate	Votes	%
Democratic	Jeanne Givens	18,165	62.57%
Democratic	David Shepherd	6,227	21.45%
Democratic	Bruce Robinson	4,638	15.98%
Total votes		29,030	100.00%

=== General election ===
==== Candidates ====
- Larry Craig (Republican)
- Jeanne Givens (Democratic)

==== Results ====
1988 Idaho's 1st congressional district general election results
Party	Candidate	Votes	%
Republican	Larry Craig (inc.)	135,221	65.79%
Democratic	Jeanne Givens	70,328	34.21%
Total votes		205,549	100.00%
Republican hold			

== District 2 ==
Incumbent Democratic Congressman Richard H. Stallings ran for re-election to a third term. Former State Senator Dane Watkins won the Republican primary and challenged Stallings in the general election. Stallings defeated Watkins by a wide margin, winning 63 percent of the vote to Stallings's 34 percent.

=== Republican primary ===
==== Candidates ====
- Dane Watkins, former State Senator
- Janet Reid, former member of the Bonneville County Library Board

==== Results ====
Republican primary results
Party	Candidate	Votes	%
Republican	Dane Watkins	20,548	58.87%
Republican	Janet Reid	14,356	41.13%
Total votes		34,904	100.00%

=== Democratic primary ===
==== Candidates ====
- Richard H. Stallings, incumbent U.S. Representative

==== Results ====
Democratic primary results
Party	Candidate	Votes	%
Democratic	Richard H. Stallings (inc.)	16,977	100.00%
Total votes		16,977	100.00%

=== General election ===
==== Candidates ====
- Richard H. Stallings (Democratic)
- Dane Watkins (Republican)
- Donovan Bramwell (Libertarian)

==== Results ====
1988 Idaho's 2nd congressional district general election results
Party	Candidate	Votes	%
Democratic	Richard H. Stallings (inc.)	127,956	63.38%
Republican	Dane Watkins	68,226	33.79%
Libertarian	Donovan Bramwell	5,703	2.82%
Total votes		201,885	100.00%
Democratic hold			

== See also ==
- 1988 United States House of Representatives elections
