= Ron Twilegar =

American politician

Member of the Boise City Council
- In office 1984–1987

Member of the Idaho Senate
- In office 1977–1982

Member of the Idaho House of Representatives
- In office 1975–1976

Personal details
- Born: Ron Jess Twilegar; September 18, 1943 Vancouver, Washington, U.S.
- Died: March 5, 2026 (aged 86) Boise, Idaho, U.S.
- Party: Democratic

Military service
- Branch/service: United States Army
- Battles/wars: Vietnam War

Ron Jess Twilegar (September 18, 1943 – March 5, 2026) was an American attorney who served as a member of the Idaho Legislature. Twilegar was the 1990 Democratic nominee for the open United States Senate seat in Idaho vacated by Jim McClure. He was defeated by Republican Congressman Larry Craig.

== Early life ==
Twilegar was born in Vancouver, Washington. He moved to Boise, Idaho when he was 10 years old and later served in the United States Army during the Vietnam War.

== Career ==
Prior to his Senate run Twilegar was a member of the Idaho Legislature, serving in the Idaho House of Representatives from 1975 to 1976 and the Idaho Senate from 1977 to 1982. Additionally, Twilegar was the Senate Minority Leader during his time in the Senate.

Twilegar was on Boise City Council from 1984 to 1987.

Twilegar ran unopposed in the primary for Boise County prosecutor and was unopposed in the general election. Although he lived in Ada County and did not have the necessary bar license, Twilegar ran in the 2008 primary in both Boise County and Camas County, seeking to ensure that he would achieve office in one of them. He won both primaries but chose to withdraw from the Camas County ballot. He was investigated by the Idaho Attorney General's office for failure to meet the legal residency requirement in Boise County, but was found to qualify for the general election, which he won.

In 2020, Twilegar ran unopposed in the Democratic primary for Ada County Prosecutor. He was defeated by Republican Jan Bennetts in the November general election.

== Personal life ==
Twilegar's ex-wife, Jackie Groves Twilegar, was the 2006 Democratic nominee for Idaho state controller, but lost the election to the Republican, Donna Jones. Twilegar was a 2nd Lieutenant in the Army for his service in the Vietnam War.

Twilegar died on March 5, 2026.

Party political offices
Preceded by Peter M. Busch	Democratic Party nominee, U.S. Senator (Class 2) from Idaho; 1990 (lost)	Succeeded by Walt Minnick
