= 1996 United States Senate election in Idaho =

- November 4, 1996
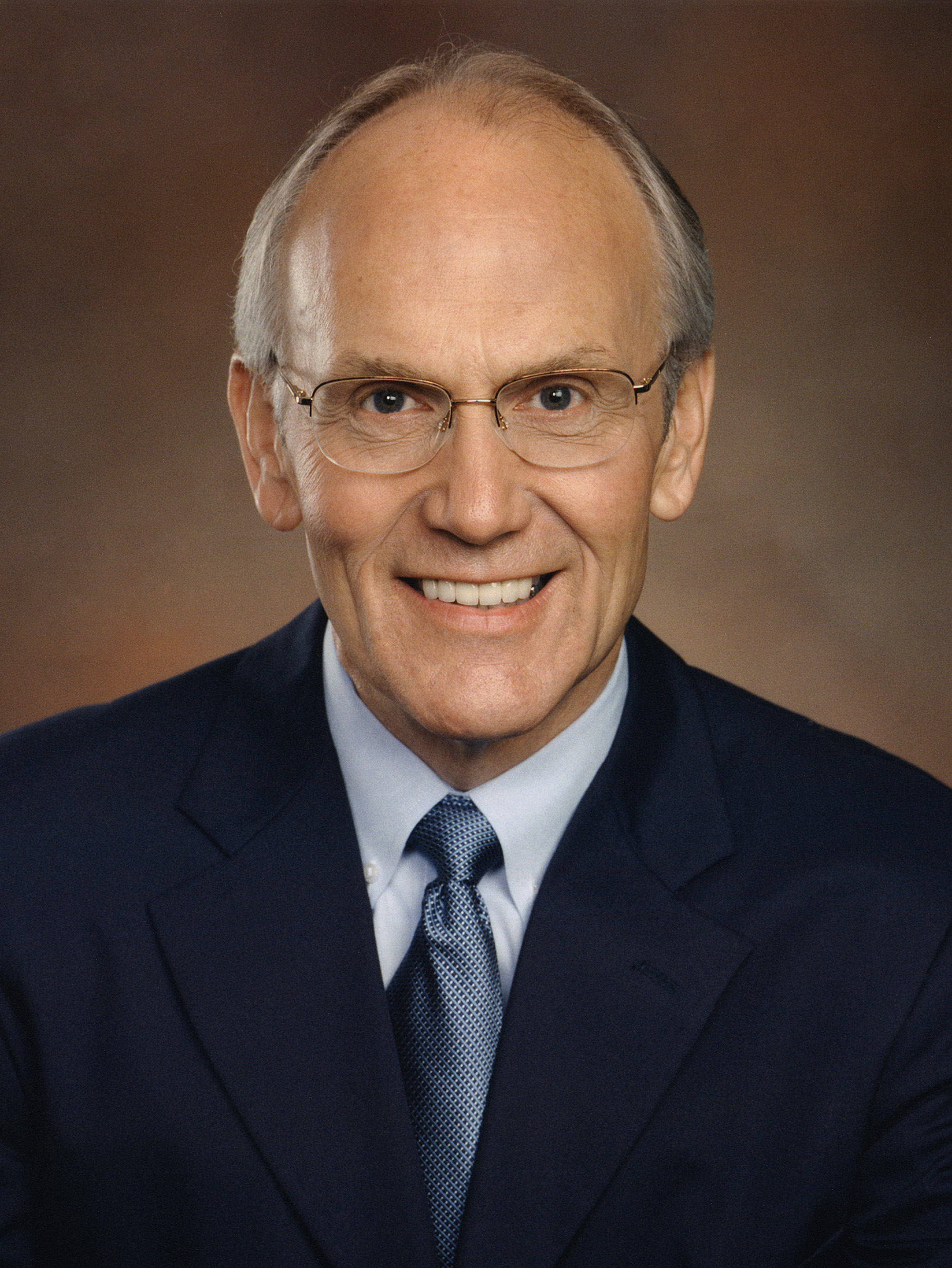

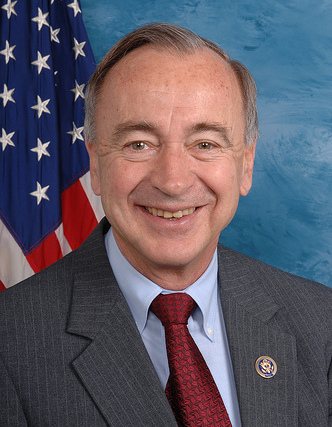
Nominee	Larry Craig	Walt Minnick
Party	Republican	Democratic
Popular vote	283,532	198,422
Percentage	57.02%	39.91%
- County results Craig: 40–50% 50–60% 60–70% 70–80% Minnick: 50–60% 60–70%
U.S. senator before election
Larry Craig
Republican
Elected U.S. Senator
Larry Craig
Republican

The 1996 United States Senate election in Idaho took place on November 4, 1996. Incumbent Larry Craig won re-election of his second term against Democrat Walt Minnick.

== Democratic primary ==
=== Candidates ===
- Walt Minnick, businessman and former Nixon Administration official

=== Results ===
Democratic primary results
Party	Candidate	Votes	%
Democratic	Walt Minnick	34,551	100.00%
Total votes		34,551	100.00%

== Republican primary ==
=== Candidates ===
- Larry Craig, incumbent U.S. senator

=== Results ===
Republican primary results
Party	Candidate	Votes	%
Republican	Larry Craig (incumbent)	106,817	100.00%
Total votes		106,817	100.00%

== General election ==
=== Candidates ===
- Larry Craig (R), incumbent U.S. senator
- Walt Minnick (D), businessman and former Nixon Administration official

=== Results ===
General election results
Party	Candidate	Votes	%	±%
Republican	Larry Craig (incumbent)	283,532	57.02%	−4.27%
Democratic	Walt Minnick	198,422	39.91%	+1.20%
Independent	Mary J. Charbonneau	10,137	2.04%	
Natural Law	Susan Vegors	5,142	1.03%	
Majority		85,110	17.12%	−5.47%
Turnout		497,233		
Republican hold		Swing		

== See also ==
- 1996 United States Senate elections
