= R. Keith Roark =

American attorney and politician (born 1949)

Chair of the Idaho Democratic Party
- In office January 2008 – February 2011
- Preceded by: Richard H. Stallings
- Succeeded by: Larry Grant

Mayor of Hailey, Idaho
- In office 1989–1993

Personal details
- Born: Ray Keith Roark; April 10, 1949 (age 77) Salt Lake City, Utah, U.S.
- Party: Democratic
- Education: University of Utah (BA, JD)

Ray Keith Roark (born April 10, 1949) is an American attorney and politician who served as chair of the Idaho Democratic Party from 2008 to 2011.

== Early life and education ==
Roark was born in Salt Lake City in 1949. He earned a Bachelor of Arts degree from the University of Utah in 1974 and a Juris Doctor from the S.J. Quinney College of Law in 1977.

== Career ==
He was a deputy prosecuting attorney and was elected in 1978 to the office of Blaine County prosecuting attorney, where he served until leaving to form the Roark Law Firm in 1985. He served as the mayor of Hailey, Idaho from 1989 to 1993

He holds the "AV" rating from Martindale-Hubbell and is listed in Super Lawyers as one of the top attorneys in Nevada, Utah, Montana, Idaho and Wyoming. In 2002, Roark was the Democratic nominee for attorney general of Idaho, losing to Lawrence Wasden.

In 2007, he was elected to the American College of Trial Lawyers. He was an unpledged delegation chair for the 2008 Democratic National Convention.

In 2008, Roark was elected chair of the Idaho Democratic Party, defeating Jerry Brady. He won re-election in March 2009 and served until February 2011.

Party political offices
Preceded by Richard H. Stallings	Chair of the Idaho Democratic Party; January 2008 – February 2011	Succeeded by Larry Grant (politician)
