= 2010 United States House of Representatives elections in Idaho =

- November 2, 2010

All 2 Idaho seats to the United States House of Representatives
	Majority party	Minority party
Party	Republican	Democratic
Last election	1	1
Seats won	2	0
Seat change	▲1	▼1
Popular vote	263,699	150,884
Percentage	58.97%	33.74%
Swing	▼0.26%	▼7.03%

Republican
40–50%
50–60%
60–70%
70–80%
80–90%
Democratic
50–60%

The 2010 congressional elections in Idaho were held on November 2, 2010, and determined who would represent the state of Idaho in the United States House of Representatives. Idaho has two seats in the House, apportioned according to the 2000 United States census. Representatives are elected for two-year terms; the winners served in the 112th Congress from January 3, 2011, until January 3, 2013.

== Overview ==
United States House of Representatives elections in Idaho, 2010
Party	Votes	Percentage	Seats	+/–
Republican	263,699	58.97%	2	+1
Democratic	150,884	33.74%	0	-1
Independents	27,865	6.23%	0	—
Libertarian	4,696	1.05%	0	-
Totals	447,144	100.00%	2	—

=== By district ===
Results of the 2010 United States House of Representatives elections in Idaho by district:

District	Republican		Democratic		Others		Total		Result
District	Votes	%	Votes	%	Votes	%	Votes	%	Result
District 1	126,231	51.02%	102,135	41.28%	19,061	7.70%	247,427	100.0%	Republican gain
District 2	137,468	68.83%	48,749	24.41%	13,500	6.76%	199,717	100.0%	Republican hold
Total	263,699	58.97%	150,884	33.74%	32,561	7.28%	447,144	100.0%	

== District 1 ==
2010 Idaho's 1st congressional district election
- November 2, 2010
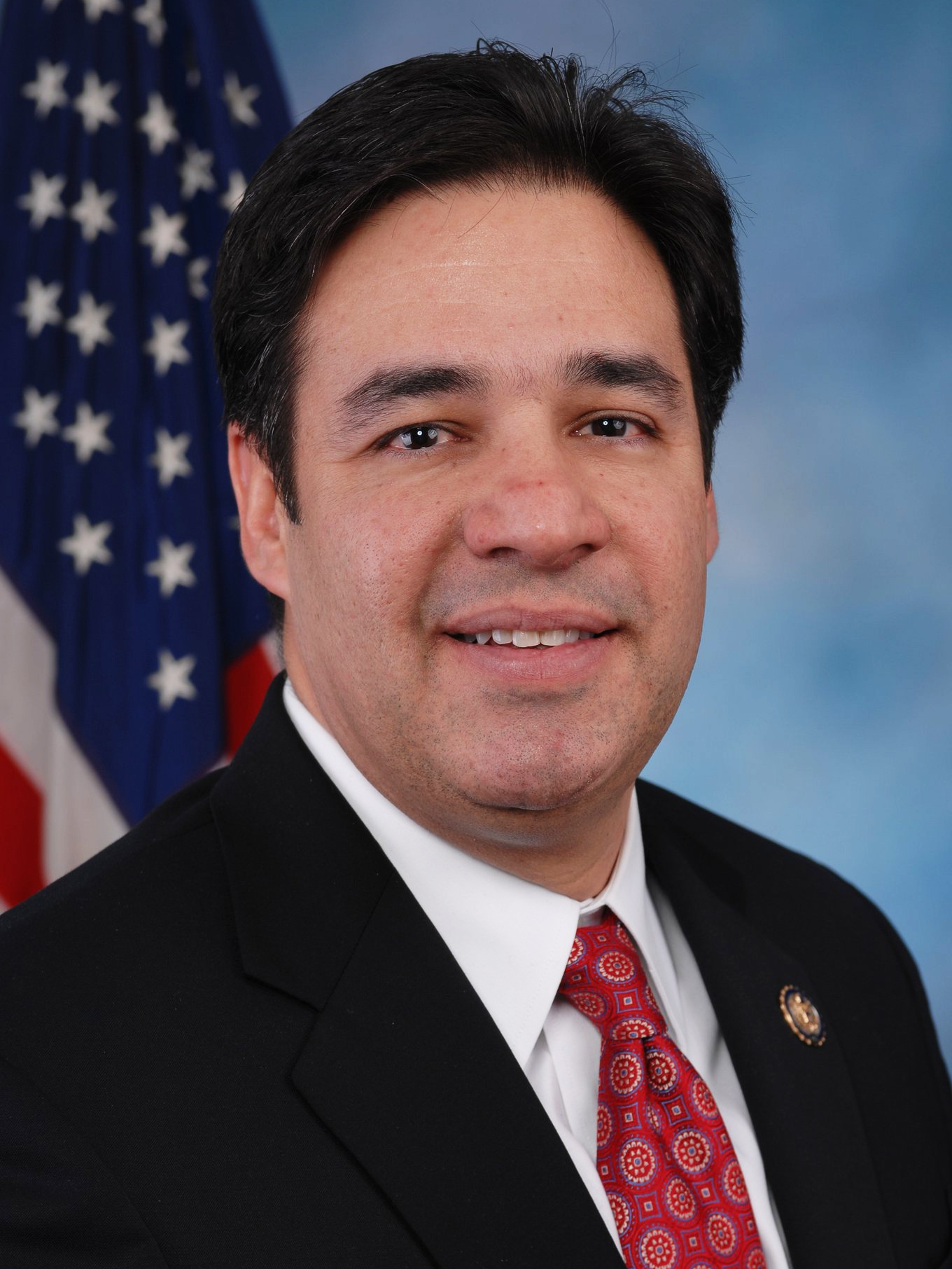

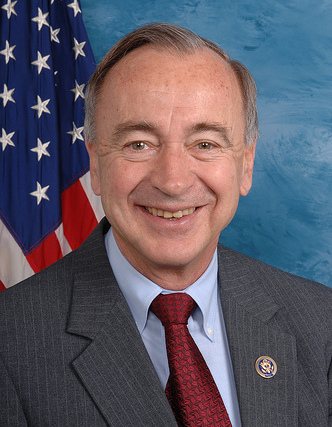
Nominee	Raúl Labrador	Walt Minnick
Party	Republican	Democratic
Popular vote	126,231	102,135
Percentage	51.0%	41.3%
Nominee	Dave Olson
Party	Independent
Popular vote	14,365
Percentage	5.81%
- County results Minnick: 40–50% 50–60% Labrador: 40–50% 50–60%
U.S. Representative before election
Walt Minnick
Democratic
Elected U.S. Representative
Raúl Labrador
Republican

In this heavily conservative district that consists of western Idaho and the Idaho Panhandle, incumbent Democratic Congressman Walt Minnick was seen as vulnerable, especially considering the fact that he won in 2008 against an embattled, weakened incumbent. Minnick, however, worked to build a profile as a moderate-to-conservative Democrat, voting against the 2009 Stimulus, the health care reform bill, and the American Clean Energy and Security Act, Furthermore, Congressman Minnick was the only Democrat to receive a perfect score from the Club for Growth, typically an organization that supports conservative Republican candidates for office.

=== Republican primary ===
Several Republican candidates, including Iraq War veteran Vaughn Ward, State Representatives Raúl Labrador and Ken Roberts, and physician Allan Salzberg, ran for the Republican nomination to challenge Minnick. Roberts eventually dropped out, as did Salzberg; both former candidates endorsed Labrador. Vaughn Ward's campaign received coverage from as far away as Great Britain as Sarah Palin came to Idaho to endorse Ward, who was one of the National Republican Congressional Committee's Young Guns. Critics seized on various troubles with the campaign, including multiple instances of plagiarism, Ward's failure to vote in the 2008 presidential elections and his referral to Puerto Rico as a "country." Ultimately, despite the fact that many prominent conservatives had lined up behind Ward, Labrador triumphed in a contentious primary election.

Republican primary results
Party	Candidate	Votes	%
Republican	Raúl Labrador	38,711	47.6
Republican	Vaughn Ward	31,582	38.9
Republican	Michael Chadwick	5,356	6.6
Republican	Harley Brown	3,168	3.9
Republican	Allan Salzberg	2,471	3.0
Total votes		81,288	100

=== General election ===
A contentious general election ensued, with both Minnick and Labrador launching aggressive campaign ads against each other. When Labrador accused the Congressman of supporting a middle class tax increase in a television ad, controversy quickly ensued; Idaho Public Television threatened to pull the ad for its inaccuracy and critics accused Labrador of taking Minnick's remarks out of context. When Minnick aired an ad, Labrador attacked it for including pictures that made him "look like an illegal immigrant." Minnick strongly stressed his independent credentials; his claims were seemingly validated when the Tea Party Express, the largest group affiliated with the broader movement, endorsed his campaign for re-election. Going into election night, polling indicated Minnick with a lead over Labrador, but after the votes were tallied, Labrador defeated Minnick by a solid margin in a surprising upset.

=== Polling ===
Poll source	Date(s) administered	Walt Minnick (D)	Raúl Labrador (R)	Undecided
Greg Smith & Associates	October 28–30, 2010	48%	38%	-
Mason-Dixon	October 20–22, 2010	44%	41%	-
Moore Information	October 5–6, 2010	37%	31%	-
Mason-Dixon	September 13–15, 2010	46%	36%	-
Qualtrics	September 1–9, 2010	60%	30%	-
GS Strategy Group	July 29, 2010	52%	29%	-
Moore Information	July 12–13, 2010	37%	27%	26%
Greg Smith & Associates	June 7–8, 2010	29%	40%	-

==== Predictions ====
Source	Ranking	As of
The Cook Political Report	Tossup	November 1, 2010
Rothenberg	Tilt D	November 1, 2010
Sabato's Crystal Ball	Lean R (flip)	November 1, 2010
RCP	Tossup	November 1, 2010
CQ Politics	Lean D	October 28, 2010
New York Times	Tossup	November 1, 2010
FiveThirtyEight	Lean D	November 1, 2010

=== Results ===
Idaho's 1st congressional district election, 2010
Party	Candidate	Votes	%
Republican	Raúl Labrador	126,231	51.02
Democratic	Walt Minnick (incumbent)	102,135	41.28
Independent	Dave Olson	14,365	5.81
Libertarian	Mike Washburn	4,696	1.90
Total votes		247,427	100.00
Republican gain from Democratic			

== District 2 ==
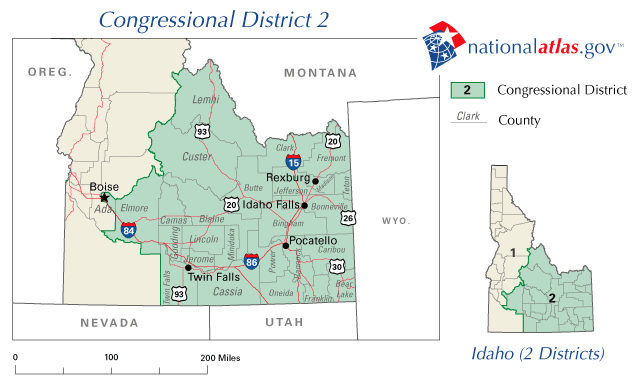

2010 GOP primary results by county: Simpson: 50–60%; 60–70%; 70–80%; Heilison: 40–50%

2010 Idaho's 2nd congressional district election
- November 2, 2010
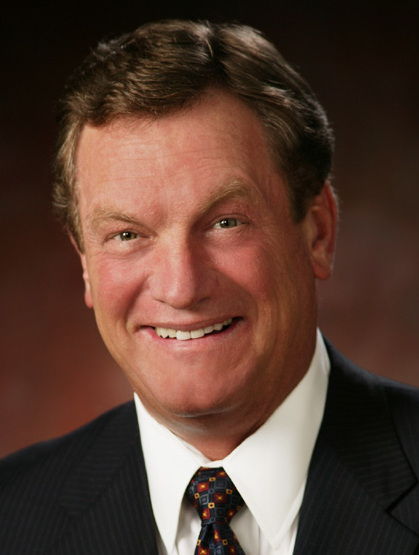
Nominee	Mike Simpson	Mike Crawford	Brian Schad
Party	Republican	Democratic	Independent
Popular vote	137,468	48,749	13,500
Percentage	68.83%	24.41%	6.76%
- County results Simpson: 50–60% 60–70% 70–80% 80–90%
U.S. Representative before election
Mike Simpson
Republican
Elected U.S. Representative
Mike Simpson
Republican

=== Republican primary ===
Republican primary results
Party	Candidate	Votes	%
Republican	Mike Simpson (incumbent)	45,148	58.3%
Republican	Chick Heileson	18,644	24.1%
Republican	Russ Mathews	7,452	9.6%
Republican	Katherine Burton	6,214	8.0%
Total votes		77,458	100.0

=== Campaign ===
This conservative district, based in eastern Idaho and the Magic Valley region of Idaho, has been represented by incumbent Republican Congressman Mike Simpson since he was first elected in 1998. Simpson did not face a serious challenge in his bid for a seventh term from Democratic candidate Mike Crawford or independent candidate Brian Schad and was re-elected by a large margin on election day.

==== Predictions ====
Source	Ranking	As of
The Cook Political Report	Safe R	November 1, 2010
Rothenberg	Safe R	November 1, 2010
Sabato's Crystal Ball	Safe R	November 1, 2010
RCP	Safe R	November 1, 2010
CQ Politics	Safe R	October 28, 2010
New York Times	Safe R	November 1, 2010
FiveThirtyEight	Safe R	November 1, 2010

=== Results ===
Idaho's 2nd congressional district election, 2010
Party	Candidate	Votes	%
Republican	Mike Simpson (incumbent)	137,468	68.83
Democratic	Mike Crawford	48,749	24.41
Independent	Brian Schad	13,500	6.76
Total votes		199,717	100.00
Republican hold			
