= 1990 United States Senate election in Idaho =

- November 6, 1990
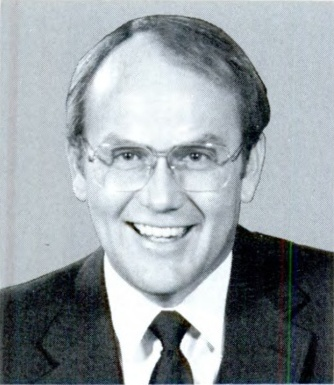

Nominee	Larry Craig	Ron Twilegar
Party	Republican	Democratic
Popular vote	193,641	122,295
Percentage	61.29%	38.71%
- County results Craig: 50–60% 60–70% 70–80% Twilegar: 50–60%
U.S. senator before election
Jim McClure
Republican
Elected U.S. Senator
Larry Craig
Republican

The 1990 United States Senate election in Idaho was held on November 6, 1990. Republican Rep. Larry Craig defeated Democratic former state legislator Ron Twilegar for the seat of U.S. Senator Jim McClure, who did not seek reelection.

== Major Candidates ==
=== Republican ===
- Larry Craig, U.S. Representative
- Jim Jones, Idaho Attorney General

=== Democratic ===
- Ron Twilegar, former State Senator
- David C. Steed

== Primary results ==
Both primary elections were held on May 22, 1990.

=== Republican ===
Primary results
Party	Candidate	Votes	%
Republican	Larry Craig	65,830	59.01%
Republican	Jim Jones	45,733	40.99%

=== Democratic ===
Primary results
Party	Candidate	Votes	%
Democratic	Ron Twilegar	30,154	64.51%
Democratic	David C. Steed	16,587	35.49%

== General Election Results ==
General election results
Party	Candidate	Votes	%
Republican	Larry Craig	193,641	61.29%
Democratic	Ron Twilegar	122,295	38.71%
Republican hold			

== See also ==
- 1990 United States Senate elections
