= Walt Minnick =

American politician (born 1942)

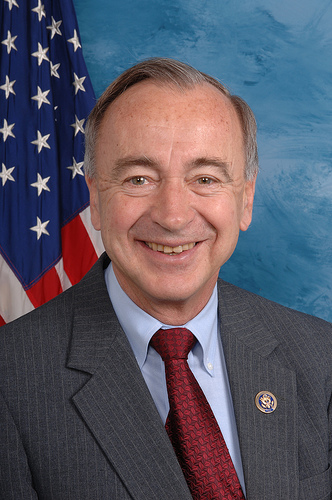
- Official portrait, 2009

Member of the U.S. House of Representatives from Idaho's 1st district
- In office January 3, 2009 – January 3, 2011
- Preceded by: Bill Sali
- Succeeded by: Raúl Labrador

Personal details
- Born: Walter Clifford Minnick; September 20, 1942 (age 84) Walla Walla, Washington, U.S.
- Party: Independent (before 1996); Democratic (1996–present)
- Spouse: Lienhart Minnick
- Children: 1
- Education: Whitman College (BA); Harvard University (MBA, JD)

Military service
- Branch/service: United States Army
- Years of service: 1970–1972
- Rank: First Lieutenant
- Battles/wars: Vietnam War

Walter Clifford Minnick (born September 20, 1942) is an American businessman, politician, and lobbyist who served as the U.S. representative for Idaho's 1st congressional district from 2009 until 2011. He is a member of the Democratic Party.

The district is in the western part of the state, and includes roughly one-fourth of Boise and most of its suburbs, as well as Meridian and Nampa. It also includes the cities of Lewiston, Moscow and Coeur d'Alene.

In 2008, Minnick defeated incumbent Bill Sali to win his seat. In 2010, he was defeated by challenger Raúl Labrador in the general election. As of 2026, he is the most recent Democrat to represent Idaho in Congress.

== Early life, education and career ==
Minnick was born in Walla Walla, Washington, and grew up on a wheat farm. In 1964 he received his bachelor's degree from Whitman College, where he was on the debate team, and was then accepted by Harvard Business School. After graduating with an MBA in 1966, he entered Harvard Law School, and graduated with a JD in 1969.

A veteran who served in the Army and Pentagon during the Vietnam War, he is the former leader of a forestry industry and founder of a chain of retail nurseries, SummerWinds Garden Centers. Minnick also served as CEO of TJ International (acquired by Weyerhaeuser in 1999) and has served on the board of directors of several corporations and nonprofit organizations.

== Early political career ==
Minnick served as a staff assistant to President Richard Nixon on the White House Domestic Council from 1971 to 1972 and as a deputy assistant director for the Office of Management and Budget from 1972 to 1973. He was also involved in the creation of the Drug Enforcement Administration. Minnick resigned from the administration in October 1973 in protest of the Watergate-era "Saturday Night massacre" in which Nixon dismissed United States Attorney General Elliot Richardson, special prosecutor Archibald Cox, and others.

== 1996 Senate bid ==
Minnick, who long considered himself a political independent, was recruited to run against incumbent Republican Senator Larry Craig in the 1996 Senate election in Idaho by then-Senator Bob Kerrey of Nebraska. Although Minnick originally intended to enter the race as an independent, he was convinced to run as a Democrat by former Idaho Governor Cecil D. Andrus. Minnick lost to Craig by 85,110 votes, receiving 40% of the vote to Craig's 57%. Minnick would have the single best performance of any Democrat against Craig, who would win his two other terms with over 60% of the vote.

== United States Representative ==
=== Elections ===
==== 2008 ====
Minnick ran unopposed in the 2008 Democratic primary held in late May. An expected primary challenge by 2006 nominee Larry Grant was averted when Grant withdrew from the race and endorsed Minnick the month prior. Although the 1st is a heavily Republican district, Democrats thought they had a realistic chance of winning the district because the Republican incumbent, Bill Sali, had been a lightning rod for controversy.

In the November 4, 2008 general election, Minnick narrowly defeated Sali by 4,211 votes, taking 51% of the vote to Sali's 49%. While Minnick carried only seven of the district's 18 counties, he prevailed largely by winning the district's share of Ada County, home to Boise and more than two-thirds of the district's vote. With his victory, Minnick represented the third most Republican district in the nation to be held by a Democrat and he became the first Democrat to represent Idaho at the federal level since Larry LaRocco, who represented the 1st District for two terms until the 1994 elections. At the time, the district had a Cook Partisan Voting Index of R+18. John McCain easily carried the district with 62% of the vote in 2008.

==== 2010 ====
Minnick was the only Democrat endorsed by the Tea Party Express, a conservative group. Minnick was challenged by Republican state Representative Raúl Labrador, Libertarian Mike Washburn, and Independent Dave Olson. Despite polls showing Minnick leading, Labrador defeated him by 24,096 votes in an upset. Since Minnick left office, no other Democrat has represented Idaho in Congress.

=== Tenure ===
After taking office, Minnick joined the Blue Dog Coalition of House Democrats. He voted with his party 71% of the time.

In January 2009, Minnick joined with 10 other Democrats to oppose the American Recovery and Reinvestment Act of 2009. In June 2009, Congressman Minnick voted with 43 other Democrats against the American Clean Energy and Security Act, and in December 2009, voted with 38 other Democrats against the Affordable Health Care for America Act. Minnick was the lone Democrat to receive a perfect score from the Club for Growth on their RePork Card ratings, for his votes to cut spending in Congress.

Minnick voted against the Stupak–Pitts Amendment which proposed to put restrictions on federal funds "to pay for any abortion or to cover any part of the costs of any health plan that includes coverage of abortion" except in cases of rape, incest or danger to the life of the mother. On March 21, 2010, Minnick voted against the Patient Protection and Affordable Care Act that President Barack Obama signed into law on March 23, 2010. Minnick said that there is very little cost control in the bill.

Minnick voted for the Lilly Ledbetter Fair Pay Act of 2009, the Helping Families Save Their Homes Act of 2009, the Family Smoking Prevention and Tobacco Control Act, the Local Law Enforcement Hate Crimes Prevention Act, and against establishing spending caps through fiscal year 2014.

=== Committee assignments ===
- Committee on Agriculture
  - Subcommittee on Conservation, Credit, Energy, and Research
  - Subcommittee on Livestock, Dairy, and Poultry
  - Subcommittee on Specialty Crops, Rural Development and Foreign Agriculture
- Committee on Financial Services
  - Subcommittee on Capital Markets, Insurance, and Government-Sponsored Enterprises
  - Subcommittee on Financial Institutions and Consumer Credit

== Later career ==
After leaving office, he co-founded the lobbying firm The Majority Group with his former chief-of-staff Rob Ellsworth and Wall Street attorney Chris DiAngelo.

== Electoral history ==
2010 Election for U.S. Representative of Idaho's 1st Congressional District
Party	Candidate	Votes	%	±%
Republican	Raúl Labrador	126,231	51.0	
Democratic	Walt Minnick (incumbent)	102,135	41.3	
Independent	Dave Olson	14,365	5.8	
Libertarian	Mike Washburn	4,696	1.9	

2008 Election for U.S. Representative of Idaho's 1st Congressional District
Party	Candidate	Votes	%	±%
Democratic	Walt Minnick	175,567	50.61	
Republican	Bill Sali (incumbent)	171,324	49.39	

1996 Election for U.S. Senate
Party	Candidate	Votes	%	±%
Republican	Larry Craig (incumbent)	283,532	57.02	
Democratic	Walt Minnick	198,422	39.91	
Independent	Mary J. Charbonneau	10,137	2.04	
Natural Law	Susan Vegors	5,142	1.03	

Party political offices
Preceded by Ron J. Twilegar	Republican nominee for U.S. Senator from Idaho (Class 2); 1996	Succeeded by Alan Blinken
U.S. House of Representatives
Preceded by Bill Sali	Member of the U.S. House of Representatives from Idaho's 1st congressional district 2009–2011	Succeeded by Raúl Labrador
U.S. order of precedence (ceremonial)
Preceded by Bill Sali as Former U.S. Representative	Order of precedence of the United States as Former U.S. Representative	Succeeded by David Smith Monson as Former U.S. Representative
