= Larry Craig =

American politician (born 1945)

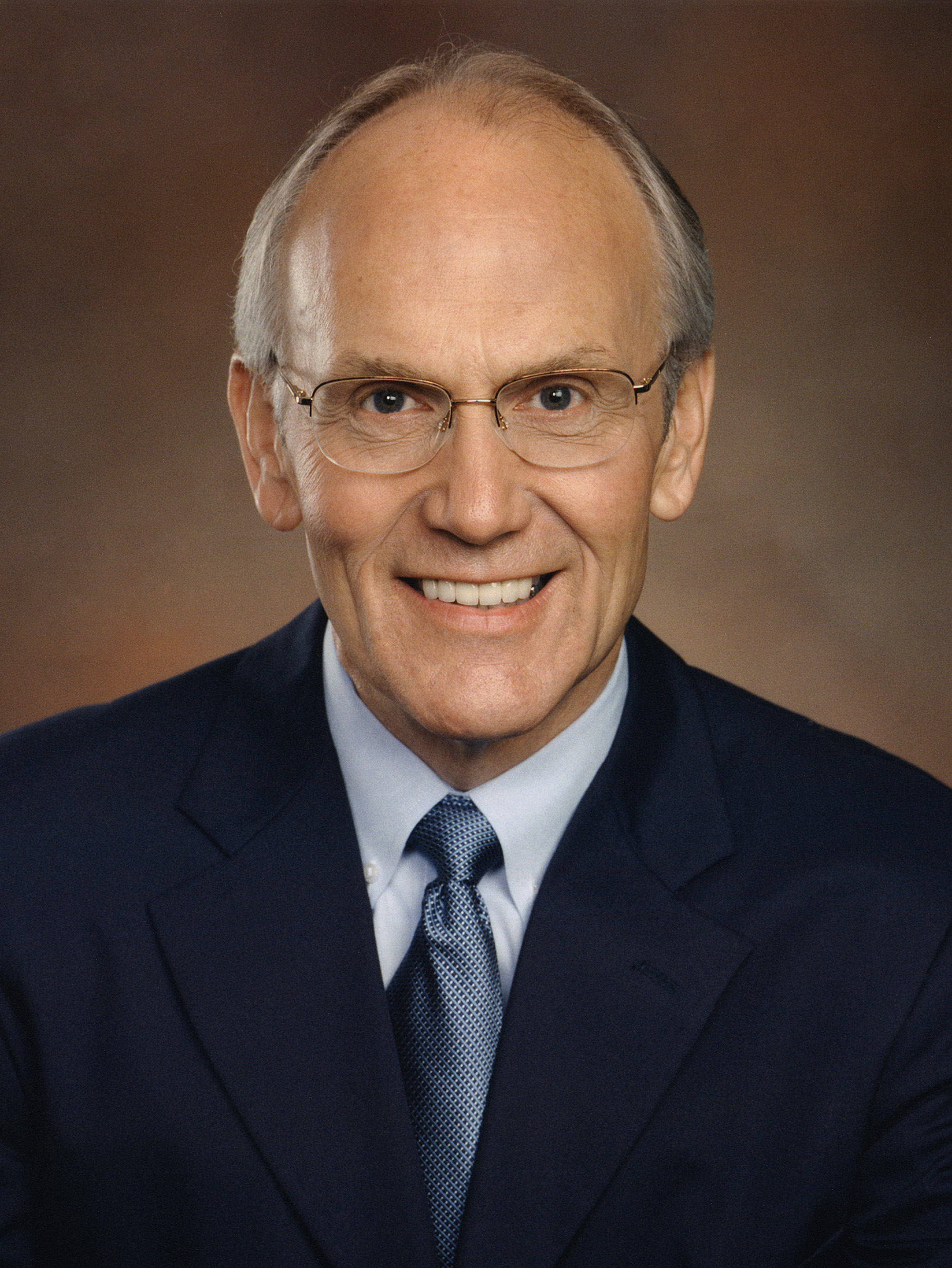
- Official portrait, 2004

United States Senator from Idaho
- In office January 3, 1991 – January 3, 2009
- Preceded by: Jim McClure
- Succeeded by: Jim Risch
Senate positions
Ranking Member of the Senate Veterans' Affairs Committee
In office January 3, 2007 – August 29, 2007
| Preceded by | Daniel Akaka |
| Succeeded by | Richard Burr |
Chair of the Senate Veterans' Affairs Committee
In office January 3, 2005 – January 3, 2007
| Preceded by | Arlen Specter |
| Succeeded by | Daniel Akaka |
Chair of the Senate Aging Committee
In office January 3, 2003 – January 3, 2005
| Preceded by | John Breaux |
| Succeeded by | Gordon H. Smith |
In office January 20, 2001 – June 6, 2001
| Preceded by | John Breaux |
| Succeeded by | John Breaux |
Chair of the Senate Republican Policy Committee
In office June 12, 1996 – January 3, 2003
| Leader | Trent Lott |
| Preceded by | Don Nickles |
| Succeeded by | Jon Kyl |

Member of the U.S. House of Representatives from Idaho's 1st district
- In office January 3, 1981 – January 3, 1991
- Preceded by: Steve Symms
- Succeeded by: Larry LaRocco

Member of the Idaho Senate from the 10th district
- In office 1974–1980
- Succeeded by: Roger Fairchild

Personal details
- Born: Lawrence Edwin Craig; July 20, 1945 (age 81) Council, Idaho, U.S.
- Party: Republican
- Spouse: Suzanne Thompson (m. 1983)
- Education: University of Idaho (BA); George Washington University (attended)

Military service
- Branch/service: United States Army
- Years of service: 1970–1972
- Rank: Private first class
- Unit: Army National Guard • Idaho Army National Guard
- Craig's voice Craig on nuclear energy legislation. Recorded January 29, 2008

Lawrence Edwin Craig (born July 20, 1945) is an American former politician who represented Idaho in the United States Senate from 1991 to 2009. A member of the Republican Party, he also represented Idaho's 1st district in the U.S. House of Representatives from 1981 to 1991.

Born in Council, Idaho, Craig was raised on a ranch in Washington County. He attended the University of Idaho, receiving a Bachelor of Arts degree in political science from the university in 1969, and later briefly attended George Washington University before returning to Washington County in 1971 to work in his family's ranching business. Following a brief stint in the Idaho Army National Guard, Craig ran for and won a seat in the Idaho Senate in 1974, and was re-elected in 1976 and 1978, before his successful first run for Congress to represent Idaho's 1st congressional district in the U.S. House of Representatives in 1980. He won reelection four times before running for the U.S. Senate in 1990, defeating Ron J. Twilegar in the general election and winning reelection in 1996 and 2002.

On June 11, 2007, Craig was arrested for indecent behavior in a men's restroom at Minneapolis–St. Paul International Airport; he pleaded guilty to a charge of disorderly conduct in August 2007 and paid $575 in court fines and fees. The arrest remained unknown to the public until the Washington, D.C.–based newspaper Roll Call disclosed it in an article, drawing widespread public attention as well as charges of hypocrisy against Craig, as he had been an opponent of LGBT rights in the United States. Despite stating that he was not and never had been homosexual, on September 1, 2007, Craig announced that he would resign from the Senate, effective September 30, 2007. He later reversed this decision and chose to finish the remainder of his term, although he did not seek re-election in 2008.

Craig was one of the Singing Senators, a group of four Republican senators that also consisted of Jim Jeffords, Trent Lott, and John Ashcroft.

== Early life, education, military service, and family ==
Craig was born in Council, Idaho, the son of Dorothy Lenore (née McCord) and Elvin Oren Craig. He grew up on a ranch outside Midvale in Washington County. In 1969 he received his Bachelor of Arts degree in political science from the University of Idaho. At the University of Idaho, he was student body president and a member of the Delta Chi fraternity. He pursued graduate studies at George Washington University before returning to his family's Midvale ranching business in 1971. Craig was a member of the Idaho Army National Guard from 1970 to 1972, attaining the rank of Private First Class (E3), after which he received an honorable discharge.

Craig married Suzanne Scott in July 1983 and adopted the three children she had from a previous marriage. Through his adopted children, Craig has nine grandchildren.

== Political career ==
Craig was elected to the Idaho Senate in 1974 and reelected in 1976 and 1978.

In 1980, Craig was elected to an open seat in the U.S. House of Representatives, representing Idaho's 1st congressional district. He succeeded Republican Steve Symms, who was leaving the House to run for election to the Senate against incumbent Democrat Frank Church. Craig was re-elected four times, serving until 1991. While in the House, he supported President Ronald Reagan's push to expand vocational education. Craig was not a major force as a legislator during his time in the House.

Allegations of cocaine use and sex with male teenage congressional pages by unnamed congressmen were pursued by investigators and journalists in 1982. Craig issued a statement denying involvement. He stated, "Persons who are unmarried as I am, by choice or by circumstance, have always been the subject of innuendos, gossip and false accusations. I think this is despicable."

Craig served on the House Ethics Committee. In 1989, he was reported to have led an extended effort that pushed for more severe punishment of Representative Barney Frank for his involvement in a gay prostitution scandal.

=== U.S. Senate ===
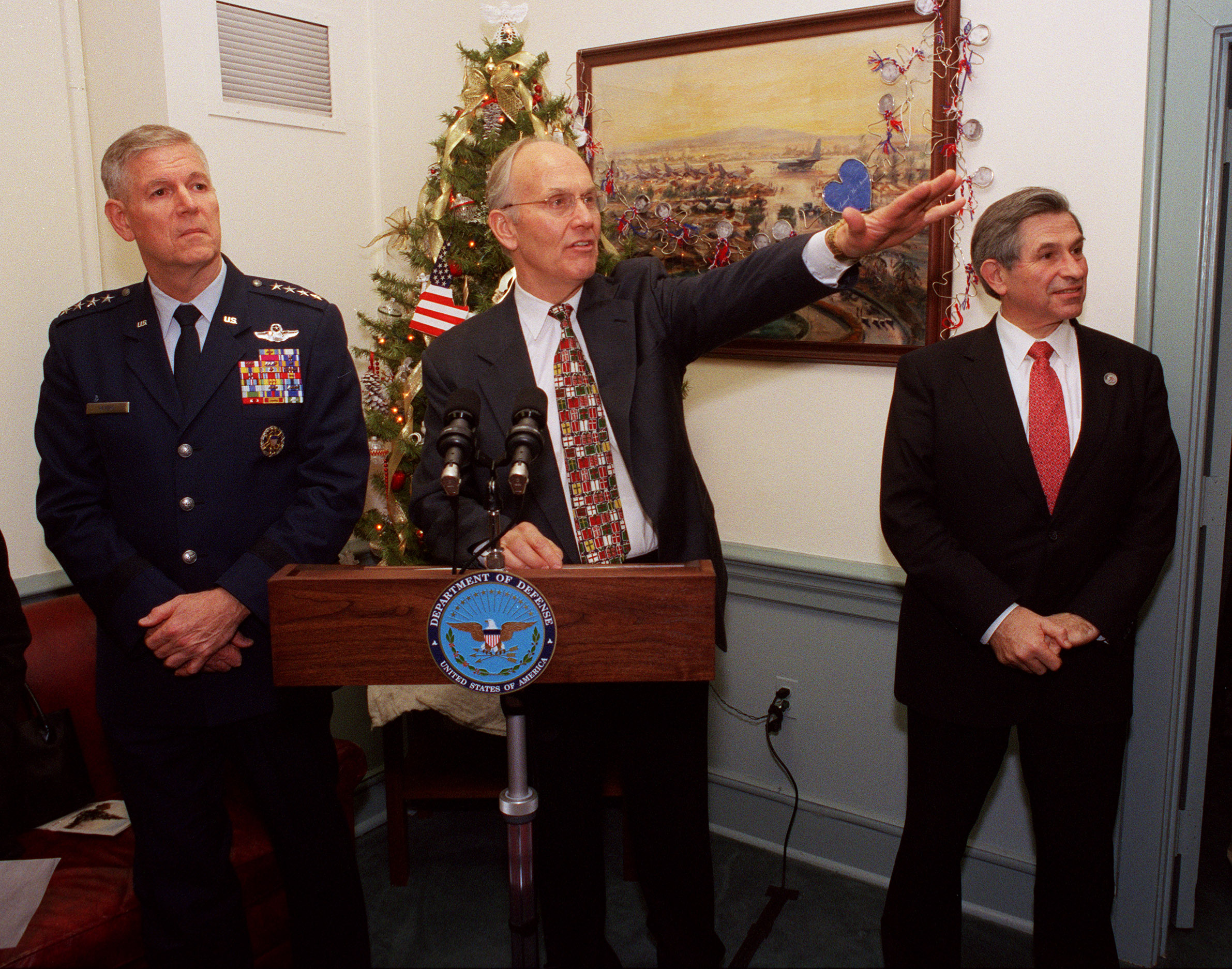
Senator Larry Craig with Chairman of the Joint Chiefs of Staff General Richard B. Myers and Deputy Secretary of Defense Paul Wolfowitz at The Pentagon on December 13, 2002

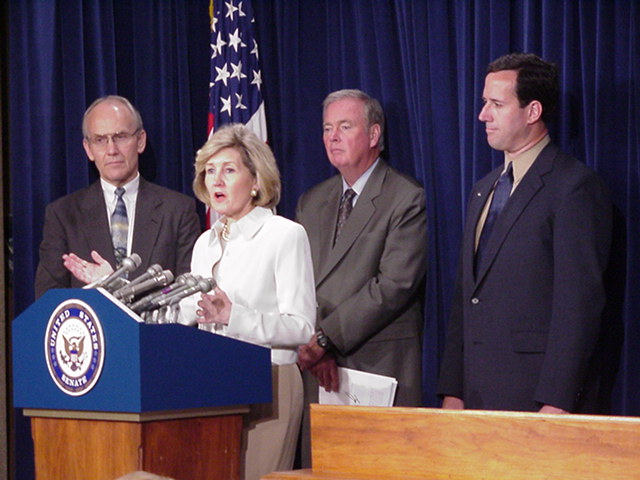
Craig with Rick Santorum, Frank Murkowski, and Kay Bailey Hutchison in 2001

Craig announced his candidacy for the 1990 Senate election for the seat vacated by the retiring James A. McClure. Craig defeated Idaho Attorney General Jim Jones in the Republican primary. In the general election, he defeated Democratic former Idaho Legislature member Ron J. Twilegar with 61 percent of the vote.

In 1995, Craig formed a barbershop quartet called The Singing Senators with Senators Trent Lott, John Ashcroft, and Jim Jeffords.

Craig was reelected in 1996, with 57 percent of the vote, defeating Democrat Walt Minnick. He was reelected again in the 2002 election with 65 percent of the vote, when he spent $3.2 million to defeat Alan Blinken.

In 1999, Craig became sharply critical of U.S. President Bill Clinton for the Monica Lewinsky scandal. Speaking on NBC's Meet The Press, Craig told Tim Russert: "The American people already know that Bill Clinton is a bad boy – a naughty boy. I'm going to speak out for the citizens of my state, who in the majority think that Bill Clinton is probably even a nasty, bad, naughty boy."

Craig served as Senate Republican Policy Committee chairman from 1997 until 2003. He then became chairman of the Special Committee on Aging. After the Democrats gained control of the Senate in the 2006 Congressional election, Craig became the ranking member of the Committee on Veterans' Affairs and a member of the Appropriations Committee and the Energy and Natural Resources Committee. He served as the ranking member of the Interior and Related Agencies Appropriations Subcommittee. Amid the controversy surrounding his arrest, in August 2007 Craig stepped aside as ranking member on the Veterans' Affairs Committee and two subcommittees.

Craig is a longtime advocate for a balanced budget amendment to the United States Constitution.

In May 2003, Craig put a hold on more than 200 Air Force promotions in an attempt to pressure the Air Force to station four new C-130 cargo planes in Idaho, saying he received a commitment from the Air Force almost seven years earlier that the planes would be delivered. Defense Department officials said the reason the C-130s had not been sent to Idaho was that no new aircraft were being manufactured for the type of transport mission done by the Idaho Air National Guard unit where Craig wanted the planes delivered.

Craig supported the guest worker program proposed by President George W. Bush. In April 2005, Craig tried to amend an Iraq War supplemental bill with an amendment that would have granted legal status to between 500,000 and one million illegal immigrants in farm work. The amendment failed with 53 votes (60 votes were needed because the amendment was not relevant to the underlying bill). A version of the AgJOBS legislation was included in the Senate-passed immigration reform bill in 2006. Craig, the principal sponsor of AgJOBS, continues to support amnesty for illegal immigrants who are "trusted workers with a significant work history in American agriculture." This position has been sharply criticized by anti-illegal immigration activists. On June 26, 2007, Craig reiterated his support for the Comprehensive Immigration Reform Act of 2007.

In October 2005, Craig suggested that flooded sections of New Orleans should be abandoned after Hurricane Katrina had hit and was quoted on a Baton Rouge television station as saying that "Fraud is in the culture of Iraqis. I believe that is true in the state of Louisiana as well."

On December 16, 2005, Craig voted against a cloture motion filed relative to the USA PATRIOT Act; the motion ultimately earned only 52 votes, and so a Democratic filibuster against extension of the act (due to expire at the end of 2005) was allowed to continue. On December 21, 2005, Craig backed a six-month extension of the Act while further negotiations took place. On February 9, 2006, Craig announced an agreement among himself, the White House, and fellow Senators John E. Sununu, Arlen Specter, Lisa Murkowski, Chuck Hagel and Richard Durbin to reauthorize the Act.

Craig supported the Federal Marriage Amendment, which barred extension of rights to same-sex couples; he voted for cloture on the amendment in both 2004 and 2006, and was a cosponsor in 2008. However, in late 2006 he appeared to endorse the right of individual states to create same-sex civil unions, but said he would vote "yes" on an Idaho constitutional amendment banning same-sex marriages when pressured to clarify his position by the anti-gay rights advocacy group Families for a Better Idaho. Craig voted against cloture on a 2002 bill which would have extended the federal definition of hate crimes to cover sexual orientation. This legislation was passed in 2007 in both the House and the Senate as the Local Law Enforcement Hate Crimes Prevention Act of 2007. Craig voted against the measure.

Prior to the nomination of Idaho Governor Dirk Kempthorne, Craig was mentioned as a possible candidate to succeed Gale Norton as United States Secretary of the Interior in March 2006.

=== Committee assignments ===
- Committee on Appropriations
  - Subcommittee on Agriculture, Rural Development, Food and Drug Administration, and Related Agencies
  - Subcommittee on Energy and Water Development
  - Subcommittee on Homeland Security
  - Subcommittee on Interior, Environment, and Related Agencies
  - Subcommittee on Military Construction and Veterans' Affairs, and Related Agencies
- Committee on Environment and Public Works
  - Subcommittee on Public Sector Solutions to Global Warming, Oversight, and Children's Health Protection
  - Subcommittee on Superfund and Environmental Health
- Committee on Energy and Natural Resources
  - Subcommittee on Energy
  - Subcommittee on Public Lands and Forests
  - Subcommittee on Water and Power
- Committee on Veterans' Affairs
- Special Committee on Aging

== 2007 arrest and aftermath ==
On June 11, 2007, Craig was arrested at the Minneapolis–Saint Paul International Airport for lewd conduct in a men's restroom. He was accused of soliciting a male undercover police officer for sexual activity. During the resulting interview with the arresting officer, Craig insisted upon his innocence, disputing the officer's version of the event by stating that he merely had a "wide stance" and that he had been picking up a piece of paper from the floor.

Craig was charged with interference with privacy, a gross misdemeanor offense, and a disorderly conduct misdemeanor. Despite his statements of innocence during the police interview, Craig pleaded guilty to the misdemeanor charge of disorderly conduct by signing and mailing a plea petition, dated August 1, 2007, to the Hennepin County District Court. Including fines and fees, he paid $575. Craig signed the petition to enter his guilty plea, which contained the provisions, "I understand that the court will not accept a plea of guilty from anyone who claims to be innocent... I now make no claim that I am innocent of the charge to which I am entering a plea of guilty." Craig mailed his signed petition to the court, and his petition to plead guilty to the misdemeanor charge was accepted and filed by the court on August 8, 2007.

On August 27, 2007, Roll Call published a story about Craig's arrest at the Minneapolis–St. Paul Airport and his subsequent guilty plea in that case. The following day, the Idaho Statesman published a story about prior allegations of inappropriate sexual behavior by Craig.

In an August 28, 2007 press conference, Craig regretted filing the guilty plea, stating "In hindsight, I should not have pled guilty. I was trying to handle this matter myself quickly and expeditiously."

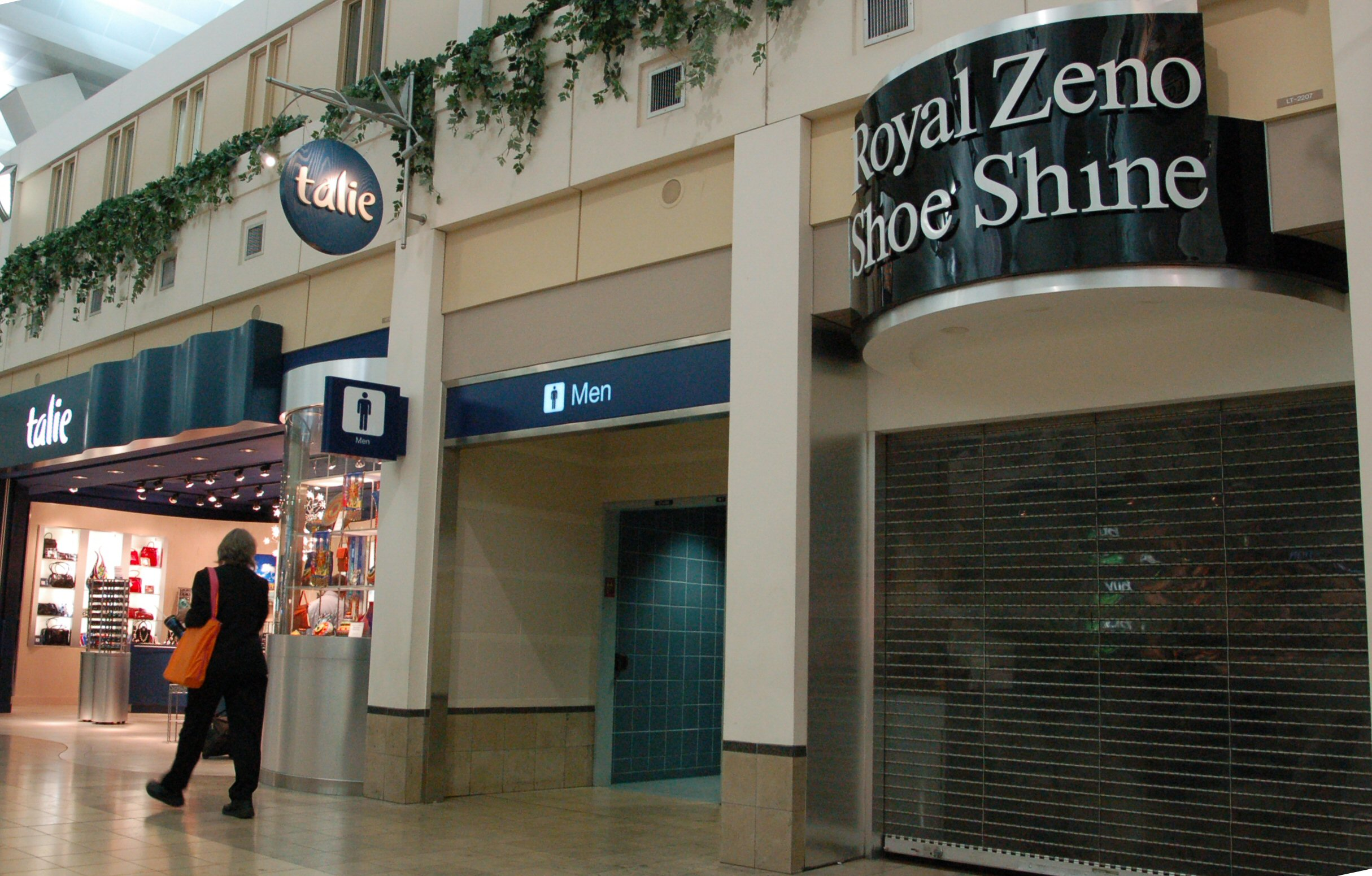
The bathroom at the Minneapolis–St. Paul airport in which the 2007 incident occurred

The Craig scandal became a major national news story.

At a news conference on September 1, 2007, Craig announced his intent to resign, "with sadness and deep regret", effective September 30, 2007. On September 4, 2007, a spokesperson for Craig indicated that he was reconsidering his decision to resign, if his conviction was rapidly overturned and his committee assignments were restored. The following week, Craig's attorneys filed a motion to withdraw his guilty plea, arguing that it "was not knowing and intelligent and therefore was in violation of his constitutional rights." The motion was ultimately denied, upholding the initial guilty plea. The controversy forced Craig to step down from his position as liaison to the Senate on the Romney campaign. Craig vehemently denied wrongdoing and said, "I am not gay. I never have been gay."

Following the ruling, Craig announced that despite his previous statements to the contrary, he would serve out his Senate term. He stated that he intended to "continue my effort to clear my name in the Senate Ethics Committee—something that is not possible if I am not serving in the Senate." Craig did not seek reelection in 2008 and left office on January 3, 2009. Craig was succeeded by Lieutenant Governor and former Governor Jim Risch.

Both the 2009 documentary Outrage and the magazine Newsweek (June 7, 2010 issue) listed Craig, among others, as a conservative politician with a record of anti-gay legislation who was caught in a gay sex scandal.

In June 2012, the Federal Election Commission sued Craig for repayment of $217,000 of campaign funds which he used to pay for his defense in his criminal case. In an August 2012 filing, Craig's lawyer Andrew Herman wrote "Not only was the trip itself constitutionally required, but Senate rules sanction reimbursement for any cost relating to a senator's use of a bathroom while on official travel"; the filing cited an FEC ruling that allowed former Congressman Jim Kolbe to use campaign funds for his legal defense in the Mark Foley scandal. A federal court in Washington, D.C. determined that he improperly paid his attorneys in this matter from his campaign funds, and Craig was ordered in 2014 to pay the Treasury $242,535. On March 4, 2016, the U.S. Court of Appeals affirmed that judgment.

== Other activities ==
Craig was inducted into the Idaho Hall of Fame in 2007.

Craig has served as a member of the board of directors of the National Rifle Association of America.

After his retirement, Craig opened the consulting firm New West Strategies with his former chief of staff Mike Ware, focusing on energy issues. The consulting firm shut down in 2019.

In 2014, Craig was the Idaho Republican Party financial chair.

== Election history ==
Senate elections in Idaho (Class II): results 1990–2002
| Year | Democrat | Votes | Pct | Republican | Votes | Pct | 3rd party | Party | Votes | Pct | 3rd party | Party | Votes | Pct |
|---|---|---|---|---|---|---|---|---|---|---|---|---|---|---|
| 1990 | Ron J. Twilegar | 122,295 | 38.7% | Larry Craig | 193,641 | 61.3% | | | | | | | | |
| 1996 | Walt Minnick | 198,422 | 39.9% | Larry Craig | 283,532 | 57.0% | Mary J. Charbonneau | Independent | 10,137 | 2.0% | Susan Vegors | Natural Law | 5,142 | 1.0% |
| 2002 | Alan Blinken | 132,975 | 32.5% | Larry Craig | 266,215 | 65.2% | Donovan Bramwell | Libertarian | 9,354 | 2.3% | | | | |

1988 Idaho 1st District United States Congressional election

Larry Craig (R) (inc.) 65.7%
Jeanne Givens (D) 34.3%

1986 Idaho 1st District United States Congressional election

Larry Craig (R) (inc.) 65.1%
William Currie (D) 32.3%
David Shepherd (I) 2.6%

1984 Idaho 1st District United States Congressional election

Larry Craig (R) (inc.) 68.6%
Bill Heller (D) 31.4%

1982 Idaho 1st District United States Congressional election

Larry Craig (R) (inc.) 53.6%
Larry LaRocco (D) 46.4%

1980 Idaho 1st District United States Congressional election

Larry Craig (R) 53.7%
Glenn W. Nichols (D) 46.3%

== See also ==
- List of federal political sex scandals in the United States

U.S. House of Representatives
| Preceded by Steve Symms | Member of the U.S. House of Representatives from Idaho's 1st congressional district 1981–1991 | Succeeded by Larry LaRocco |
Party political offices
| Preceded by Jim McClure | Republican nominee for U.S. Senator from Idaho (Class 2); 1990, 1996, 2002 | Succeeded by Jim Risch |
| Preceded by Malcolm Wallop | Chair of the Senate Republican Steering Committee; 1995–1996 | Succeeded by Kay Bailey Hutchison |
| Preceded by Don Nickles | Chair of the Senate Republican Policy Committee; 1996–2003 | Succeeded by Jon Kyl |
U.S. Senate
| Preceded by Jim McClure | U.S. Senator (Class 2) from Idaho; 1991–2009; Served alongside: Steve Symms, Dirk Kempthorne, Mike Crapo | Succeeded by Jim Risch |
| Preceded by John Breaux | Ranking Member of the Senate Aging Committee; 2001–2003 | Succeeded by John Breaux |
| Preceded by John Breaux | Chair of the Senate Aging Committee; 2003–2005 | Succeeded by Gordon Smith |
| Preceded by Arlen Specter | Chair of the Senate Veterans' Affairs Committee; 2005–2007 | Succeeded by Daniel Akaka |
| Preceded by Daniel Akaka | Ranking Member of the Senate Veterans' Affairs Committee; 2007 | Succeeded by Richard Burr |
U.S. order of precedence (ceremonial)
| Preceded by Jon Tester as Former U.S. Senator | Order of precedence of the United States as Former U.S. Senator | Succeeded by Jake Garn as Former U.S. Senator |
