= Larry Grant (politician) =

American businessman (born 1946)

Chair of the Idaho Democratic Party
- In office February 2011 – August 2013
- Preceded by: R. Keith Roark
- Succeeded by: Larry Kenck

Personal details
- Born: February 1, 1946 (age 80) Boise, Idaho
- Party: Democratic
- Education: Columbia University (B.A. 1968); University of Denver (J.D., 1971)

Larry Grant (born February 1, 1946, Boise, Idaho) is a retired Idaho businessman and was the Democratic candidate who ran in Idaho's 1st congressional district in 2006. Grant was chair of the Idaho Democratic Party from 2011 to 2013.

== Early life and education ==
Grant earned his bachelor's degree from Columbia College of Columbia University in 1968 and his J.D. degree from the Sturm College of Law, graduating summa cum laude in 1971.

== Career ==
Grant was a lawyer in private practice in Denver and Boise from 1972 through 1985. In 1985, he joined Micron Technology, a manufacturer of dynamic random-access memory (DRAM), as the young company's first general counsel. It was a critical time for the U.S. semiconductor industry. That year, seven of the United States' leading semiconductor makers left the DRAM business as Japanese companies took over the market and prices drastically declined. In response, Grant initiated the first ever semiconductor antidumping case with the U.S. International Trade Commission. As a result, President Reagan imposed duties on Japanese semiconductor manufacturers who were selling their product in the United States below cost. The case laid the groundwork for the U.S.-Japan Semiconductor Trade Agreement of 1986 and is credited by some analysts as having been a significant factor in the survival and growth of Micron in its early years. Grant left Micron in 1996 to work as vice president and general counsel for VLSI Technology in San Jose, California.

=== Political career ===
==== 2006 ====
Grant announced in August 2005 that he would run to represent Idaho's 1st District. In November 2005, he became the first Idaho congressional candidate to launch a campaign blog. Grant advocated living-wage jobs; affordable, accessible health care; more international cooperation in ending the war in Iraq; and to put the brakes on federal spending. Grant opposes drilling for oil in the Arctic National Wildlife Refuge. On May 23, 2006, Grant won the Democratic primary for U.S. House in the First District with 75 percent of the vote.

Incumbent Representative Butch Otter announced that he would leave Congress to run for governor. In a field of six candidates, the controversial Bill Sali, won the primary with 26% of the vote. Sali clashed repeatedly with Republican leadership in the Idaho Legislature. As a result, many Republicans declared they would support Grant. All this gave Grant a boost in the general election, but Sali remained favored given the GOP tilt of the area and the popular Otter at the top of the ticket. Grant made gains late in the campaign, but Sali held on to win 50% to 45%, a close margin considering Idaho's 1st district supported George W. Bush's reelection in 2004 by 68% to 30%.

==== 2008 ====
Grant sought a rematch against Sali but withdrew a month before the May 2008 primary and threw his support behind fellow Democrat Walt Minnick, saying he believes Minnick has the best chance to defeat Sali.

=== Idaho Democratic Party Chair ===
Larry Grant was elected as the Chair of the Idaho Democratic Party for a two-year term in February 2011. He made great strides in organizing the party and in 2012 a record number of Democrats ran for office as a result of his recruiting efforts. Grant stepped down from being State Chair in 2013.

=== Community Involvement ===
He previously served as a director of Western Idaho Training Company in Caldwell, Idaho, which provides employment opportunities for people with disabilities. He previously served as a member of the advisory council to the University of Idaho School of Business.

Party political offices
| Preceded by R. Keith Roark | Chair of the Idaho Democratic Party; February 2011- August 2013 | Succeeded by Larry Kenck |
Party political offices
| Preceded by Naomi Preston | Democratic Party nominee, Idaho's 1st congressional district 2006 (lost) | Succeeded by Walt Minnick |
