= Jeanne Givens =

American politician

Member of the Idaho House of Representatives from the 4th district - Seat A
- In office 1985–1989
- Succeeded by: Marvin Vandenberg

Personal details
- Born: Jeanne Iyall c. 1951/1952 Plummer, Idaho, U.S.
- Party: Democratic
- Spouse: Ray Givens

Jeanne Givens (born c. 1951/1952) is an American politician who served in the Idaho House of Representatives from the 4th district as a member of the Democratic Party from 1985 to 1989. She is a member of the Coeur d'Alene tribe and was the first Native American woman elected to the Idaho House of Representatives. In 1988, Givens became the first Native American woman to run for a seat in the United States Congress.

Givens was born in Plummer, Idaho, and was raised in San Jose, California and on the Coeur d'Alene reservation in Plummer. She is related to multiple prominent members of the Coeur d'Alene tribe. In the 1980s she was appointed to multiple board positions by Governor John Evans and unsuccessfully ran for a seat in the Idaho House of Representatives in 1982, before winning in 1984. In 1988, and 1990, she ran in Idaho's 1st congressional district for a seat in the United States House of Representatives, but was defeated both times.

During her tenure in the Idaho House of Representatives she served on the Indian Affairs, Business, Education, and Health and Welfare committees.

== Early life ==
Jeanne Iyall was born in c. 1951/1952, in Plummer, Idaho, to Celina Garry and Jack Iyall, who later divorced. In 1955, the family participated in a federal relocation program and moved to San Jose, California. Celina Garry later married Ralph Zarste and Donald Goolesby before moving back to the Coeur d'Alene Reservation in Plummer, Idaho.

She is a member of the Coeur d'Alene tribe and her grandfather, Ignace Garry, was the last chief of the tribe and her uncle, Joseph Garry, was the only full-blooded Native American to serve in the Idaho legislature. She attended Whitworth University and majored in sociology, but did not graduate. Iyall married Ray Givens. Givens served as a probation officer and instructor of speech and communication at North Idaho College.

== Career ==
=== Appointments ===
In 1982, Givens was appointed to the Statewide Health Planning Council by Governor John Evans. She served on the Idaho Association for the Humanities until 1985, when Gretchen Hellar was appointed to replace Givens by Governor Evans. In 1985 and 1989, Givens was appointed to serve on the fourteen member committee that planned the centennial celebration of Idaho's statehood.

=== Idaho House of Representatives ===
==== Elections ====
In 1982, she ran with the Democratic nomination against incumbent Republican Representative Robert Scates for a seat in the Idaho House of Representatives in the 3rd district Seat A. In the general election she was defeated by Scates.

On April 1, 1984, Givens announced that she would seek election to the Idaho House of Representatives. Givens ran unopposed in the Democratic primary and received the party's nomination to run from the 4th district Seat A. In the general election she defeated Republican nominee Ralph Kizer. Givens was the first Native American woman ever elected to the Idaho House of Representatives.

In 1986, state Senator Vernon Lannen died in a logging accident and Givens ran to succeed him in the Idaho Senate. However, on June 26, she announced that she would withdraw from the Senate election. She won reelection to the House of Representatives without opposition. During the 1986 elections Givens had run the House Democratic election committee.

==== Tenure ====
During the 1984 Democratic presidential primaries Givens supported Senator Gary Hart and served as one of his eleven delegates to the Democratic National Convention from Idaho. During the 1988 Democratic presidential primaries she called for Hart to not enter the race due to his affair with Donna Rice Hughes. Instead of supporting a candidate she wrote a letter to Idaho's delegates asking them to remain uncommitted.

During her tenure in the Idaho House of Representatives she served on the Indian Affairs, Business, Education, and Health and Welfare committees. On December 10, 1987, she was appointed as a member of the State Affairs committee by Speaker Tom Boyd after Representative Steve Herndon resigned to accept an appointment to the Idaho Senate.

In 1989, Givens was named as one of Idaho's ten most influential residents of the decade by the Idaho State Journal.

== U.S. House of Representatives campaigns ==
=== 1988 ===
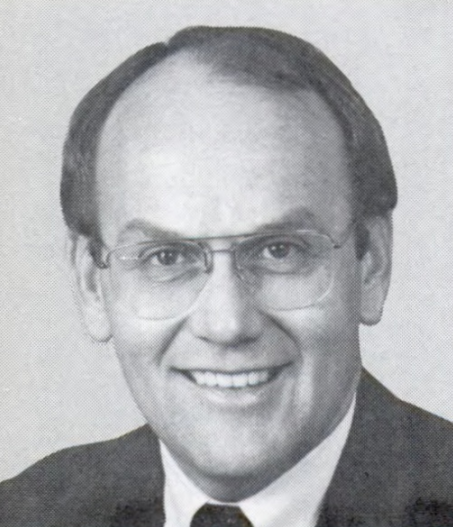
In 1988, Givens ran against Representative Larry Craig in Idaho's 1st congressional district

On April 13, 1988, Givens announced that she would seek the Democratic nomination for Idaho's 1st congressional district against incumbent Republican Representative Larry Craig and filed to run on April 15. She stated that would serve in the grassroots tradition of Gracie Pfost, the first woman to represent Idaho in the United States House of Representatives. She won the Democratic nomination against Bruce Robinson and David Shepard, but was defeated in the general election by Craig.

During the campaign she fired her campaign manager Carmi McLean with McLean claiming that it was due to McLean's disagreements with Ray Givens. Mike Brush was selected to replace McLean as Givens' campaign manager. Givens was the first Native American woman to run for a seat in the United States Congress and would later be followed by Ada Deer.

=== 1990 ===
On August 9, 1989, Givens formed an exploratory committee to consider running against Craig again during the 1990 election. On January 31, 1990, Givens announced that she would run in the Democratic primary and that her chances of winning were greater due to Craig choosing to run for Idaho's seat in the United States Senate rather than seek reelection to the House of Representatives. However, she placed second behind Larry LaRocco.

During the campaign Givens took out a total of $27,900 in loans to finance her campaign. In September 1990, she repaid a $9,900 loan she took from the Mountain West Savings Bank, but by 1992, she still was still $18,000 in debt due to a loan that was taken out from Key Bank. The $18,000 loan was used to hire a Seattle consulting firm for television ads.

== Later life ==
In 1989, Givens represented Governor Cecil Andrus at the Western Governors Association session to discuss Native American issues.

During the 1992 Democratic presidential primaries Givens supported Senator Tom Harkin and was selected to serve on the twenty-five member Idahoans for Harkins Committee by Phil Lansing, Harkin's Idaho coordinator, on February 12, 1992.

On August 7, 1992, Givens filed to run for a seat on North Idaho College Board of Trustees to succeed retiring incumbent Jack Beebe. In the general election she defeated James Zipperer. In 1997, she was appointed by President Bill Clinton to the Board of Directors of the Institute of American Indian Arts in Santa Fe, New Mexico.

In 2014, Paulette Jordan, another female member of the Coeur d'Alene tribe, was elected to the Idaho House of Representatives. Jordan stated that Givens was a mentor to her.

== Political positions ==
=== Alcohol ===
On March 20, 1986, the Idaho House of Representatives voted 53 to 31, with Givens against, in favor of legislation which would raise Idaho's drinking age from 19 to 21.

=== Education ===
On January 20, 1986, Representative R. L. Davis introduced a questionnaire asking yes or no to the elimination of kindergarten from public schools or only offering it during short summer sessions, cutting education salaries by 5%, charging students for bus transportation unless their parent's property tax is above a certain level, replace paid teachers' aides with unpaid volunteers, freeze education funding, reduce athletic activities, year-round classes, repeal legislation allowing school to increase property taxes, and require property taxes to help fund colleges. Givens stated that Davis' questionnaire was "thoughtless" and "outrageous".

On January 24, 1986, the Education committee voted 11 to 4, with Givens against, to advance legislation into the Idaho House of Representatives that would require creationism to be taught alongside evolution. During the debate on the legislation in the House of Representatives Givens stated that "Just as my dress is different than yours today, so are my beliefs in creation" while wearing a traditional beaded leather dress. The House of Representatives voted 53 to 31 against the legislation.

On February 3, 1988, the State Affairs committee in the Idaho House of Representatives advanced legislation, with Givens as the only member opposed, that would make English the only official language used in Idaho.

=== Native Americans ===
In 1987, Givens opposed the creation of a national monument to the Battle of Bear River stating that "It isn't worthy of a national monument" as federal soldiers attacked a Native American encampment and massacred the inhabitants.

On February 14, 1992, William A. Hilliard, the editor of The Oregonian, announced that The Oregonian would not publish the names of sport teams that have racial, ethnic, or religious connotations, which included the Washington Redskins. Givens praised the decision stating that "the use of team names such as the Redskins is racially derogatory" and that those team names "plant an image in the public's mind that is not positive. It reinforces a stereotype of savages and heathens."

=== Ratings ===
In 1986, she was given a 100% rating from the Idaho Conservation League. The Sportsmen's Political Action Committee gave her a 95% rating.

=== Unions ===
On January 18, 1985, the Idaho House of Representatives voted 64 to 20, with Givens against, in favor of right-to-work legislation. Governor Evans vetoed the legislation and during the veto override vote the Idaho Senate voted 28 to 14, and the Idaho House of Representatives voted 65 to 18, with Givens voting to sustain the veto.

In 1986, Representative Jerry Callen introduced legislation which would restrict teacher contract negotiations to only wages and the monetary value of fringe benefits. Givens stated that the legislation was "punitive and restrictive" and the Idaho House of Representatives voted 50 to 33 against it on February 14.

== Electoral history ==
Jeanne Givens electoral history

1982 Idaho House of Representatives 3rd district Seat A election
Party	Candidate	Votes	%
Republican	Robert Scates (incumbent)	4,895	53.95%
Democratic	Jeanne Givens	4,178	46.05%
Total votes		9,073	100.00%

1984 Idaho House of Representatives 4th district Seat A election
Party	Candidate	Votes	%
Democratic	Jeanne Givens	23,350	50.53%
Republican	Ralph Kizer	22,857	49.47%
Total votes		46,207	100.00%

1988 Idaho 1st congressional district election
Primary election
Party	Candidate	Votes	%
Democratic	Jeanne Givens	18,165	62.57%
Democratic	David Shepard	6,227	21.45%
Democratic	Bruce Robinson	4,638	15.98%
Total votes		29,030	100.00%
General election
Republican	Larry Craig (incumbent)	135,221	65.79%
Democratic	Jeanne Givens	70,328	34.21%
Total votes		205,549	100.00%

1990 Idaho 1st congressional district Democratic primary
Party	Candidate	Votes	%
Democratic	Larry LaRocco	14,015	43.45%
Democratic	Jeanne Givens	10,733	33.28%
Democratic	Dick Rush	7,505	26.27%
Total votes		32,253	100.00%

1992 North Idaho College Board of Trustees election
Party	Candidate	Votes	%
Nonpartisan	Jeanne Givens	782	80.29%
Nonpartisan	James Zipperer	192	19.71%
Total votes		974	100.00%

== See also ==
- List of Native American politicians
- Native American women in politics
