= 2026 United States Senate election in Idaho =

- November 3, 2026
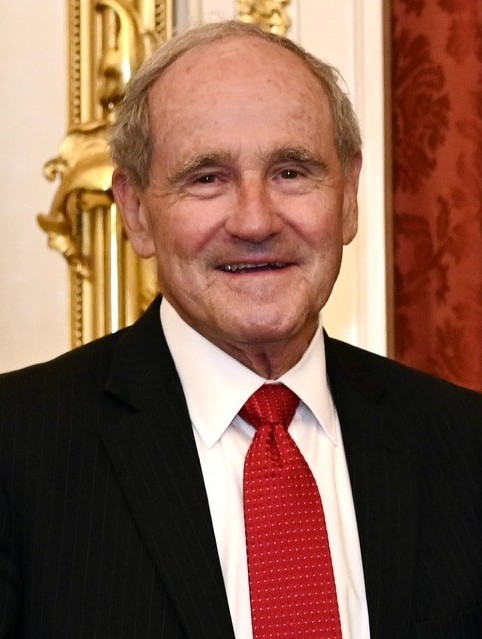

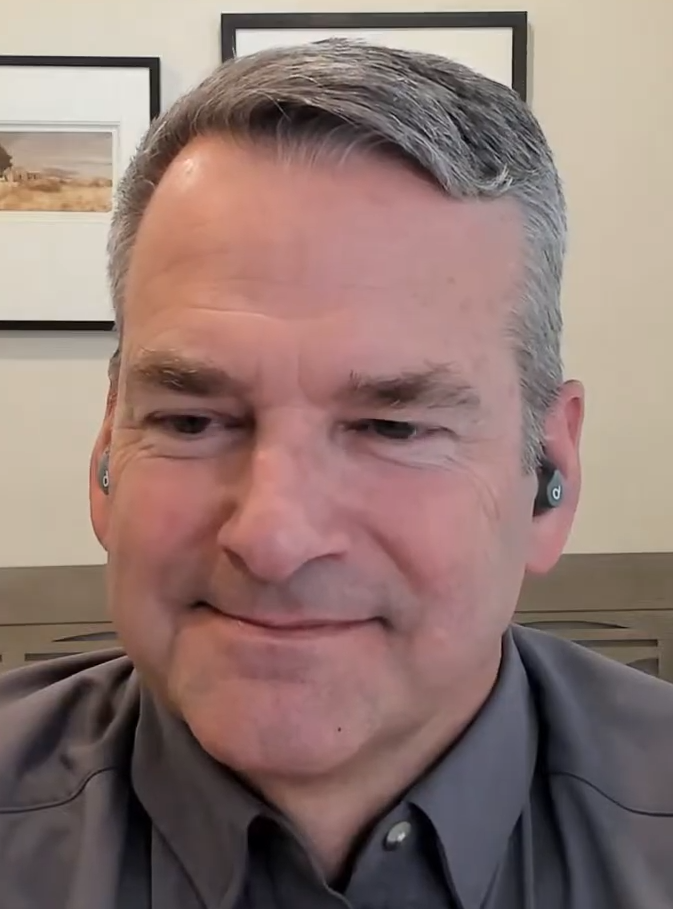

Nominee	Jim Risch	Todd Achilles	Natalie Fleming
Party	Republican	Independent	Independent
Popular vote	402,983	239,422	50,134
Percentage	56.50%	33.56%	7.03%
- Risch: 40–50% 50–60% 60–70% 70–80% 80–90% Achilles: 40–50% 50–60% 60–70%
U.S. senator before election
Jim Risch
Republican
Elected U.S. senator
Jim Risch
Republican

The 2026 United States Senate election in Idaho was an election held on November 3, 2026, to elect a member of the United States Senate to represent the state of Idaho. Republican incumbent Jim Risch was re-elected a fourth term, defeating independent former state representative Todd Achilles and independent software developer Natalie Fleming.

Primary elections were held on May 19. Risch won the Republican nomination with 67.3% of the vote, facing minimal opposition. The Democratic nomination was won by realtor David Roth, who was the nominee in 2022, but after Achilles entered the race in July with the support of Democratic leaders, Roth withdrew near the end of the month.

== Background ==
Idaho is considered a deeply red state at the federal and state levels, having been won by Donald Trump by landslide margins in all three of his Presidential elections. Republicans hold every statewide office, large supermajorities in both houses of the Idaho Legislature and the entire Congressional delegation.

This was one of three races (along with Nebraska and South Dakota) in the 2026 Senate election cycle where the Democratic nominee withdrew from the race.

== Republican primary ==
=== Candidates ===
==== Nominee ====
- Jim Risch, incumbent U.S. senator

==== Eliminated in primary ====
- Joe Evans, data engineer and Libertarian nominee for ID-1 in 2020
- Denny LaVe, entrepreneur
- Josh Roy, engineer

=== Endorsements ===
Jim Risch

Executive branch officials

- Donald Trump, president of the United States (2017–2021, 2025–present)

Organizations

- AIPAC

=== Fundraising ===
Campaign finance reports as of April 29, 2026
Candidate	Raised	Spent	Cash on hand
Jim Risch (R)	$3,937,857	$2,402,936	$3,729,780
Denny Lave (R)	$164,600	$109,923	$54,677
Josh Roy (R)	$27,384	$14,495	$12,889
Joe Evans (R)	$7,741	$7,650	$91
Source: Federal Election Commission

=== Results ===
Results by county: Risch: 40–50%; 50–60%; 60–70%; 70–80%

Results by precinct: Risch: 30–40%; 40–50%; 50–60%; 60–70%; 70–80%; 80–90%; 90–100%; Roy: 30-40%; 40-50%; 50-60%; 60-70%; Evans: 30-40%; 40-50%; 50-60%

Republican primary results
Party	Candidate	Votes	%
Republican	Jim Risch (incumbent)	156,140	67.3
Republican	Josh Roy	33,188	14.3
Republican	Joe Evans	32,636	14.1
Republican	Denny LaVe	10,182	4.4
Total votes		232,146	100.0

== Democratic primary ==
=== Candidates ===
==== Withdrew after nomination ====
- David Roth, realtor, nominee for U.S. Senate in 2022, and nominee for ID-2 in 2024

==== Eliminated in primary ====
- Nickolas Bonds, estate executive
- Brad Moore

=== Endorsements ===
David Roth

Newspapers

- Idaho Statesman

=== Fundraising ===
Campaign finance reports as of April 29, 2026
Candidate	Raised	Spent	Cash on hand
David Roth (D)	$8,642	$8,186	$1,051
Source: Federal Election Commission

=== Results ===
Results by county: Roth: 40–50%; 50–60%; 60–70%; Moore: 50–60%; Roth-Moore Tie: 40%

Results by precinct: Roth: 30-40%; 40-50%; 50-60%; 60-70%; 70-80%; 80-90%; 90-100%; Moore: 40-50%; 50-60%; 60-70%; 70-80%; 80-90%; 90-100%; Bonds: 30-40%; 40-50%; 50-60%; 60-70%; 70-80%; 80-90%; 90-100%; Tie No Votes

Democratic primary results
Party	Candidate	Votes	%
Democratic	David Roth	29,534	61.9
Democratic	Brad Moore	14,863	31.1
Democratic	Nickolas Bonds	3,344	7.0
Total votes		47,741	100.0

== Libertarian primary ==
=== Candidates ===
==== Nominee ====
- Matt Loesby, nominee for Idaho's 1st congressional district in 2024

=== Results ===
Libertarian primary results by county

Libertarian primary results
Party	Candidate	Votes	%
Libertarian	Matt Loesby	855	100.0
Total votes		855	100.0

== Independents ==
=== Candidates ===
==== Declared ====
- Todd Achilles, former Democratic state representative from the 16th district (2024–2025)
- Natalie Fleming, software developer and candidate for Idaho's 1st congressional district in 2018, U.S. Senate in 2020, and Republican candidate for U.S. Senate in 2022

=== Fundraising ===
Campaign finance reports as of June 30, 2026
Candidate	Raised	Spent	Cash on hand
Todd Achilles (I)	$692,245	$506,311	$194,226
Source: Federal Election Commission

== General election ==
=== Campaign ===
On July 8, 2026, the Ada County Democratic Central Committee sent Roth a letter giving him until August 12 to prove that his campaign "has turned a corner" by raising $50,000 and producing a campaign plan, or the committee would consider endorsing independent candidate Todd Achilles instead. The committee said it was concerned that Roth's campaign was "not positioned to meet the moment” and argued that "we can't afford to let this moment slip away in the best political environment Idaho has seen in decades." Roth called the demands "completely ridiculous" and said he had no intention of complying, while accusing local Democratic leaders of trying to force him out of the race in favor of Achilles. On July 28, Roth announced he would drop out of the race.

=== Predictions ===
Source	Ranking	As of
The Cook Political Report	Solid R	November 2, 2026
Decision Desk HQ	Safe R	November 3, 2026
The Economist (Note: The Economist's prediction model uses unconventional terminology. For the purpose of equivalency, their "Very Likely" ratings are formatted as a "Likely" rating while "Likely" ratings are formatted as a "Lean" rating.)	Safe R	November 3, 2026
FiftyPlusOne	Safe R	November 3, 2026
Fox News	Solid R	November 1, 2026
Inside Elections	Solid R	October 29, 2026
MS NOW	Safe R	October 29, 2026
NBC News	Solid R	November 3, 2026
RealClearPolitics	Solid R	November 2, 2026
Sabato's Crystal Ball	Safe R	November 2, 2026
Silver Bulletin	Solid R	November 3, 2026
Split Ticket	Safe R	November 2, 2026

=== Endorsements ===
Jim Risch (R)

Statewide officials

- Butch Otter, former governor of Idaho (2007–2019) and former U.S. representative from ID-01 (2001–2007)

Organizations

- U.S. Chamber of Commerce
Todd Achilles (I)

Executive branch officials

- Christine Todd Whitman, former Administrator of the Environmental Protection Agency (2001–2003), former Governor of New Jersey (1994–2001), and co-chair of the Forward Party (2022–present) (Forward; elected as a Republican)

Party officials

- Andrew Yang, co-chair of the Forward Party (2022–present) (Forward)

Political parties

- Forward Party

Labor unions

- American Federation of Government Employees
- Idaho Education Association

=== Fundraising ===
Campaign finance reports as of October 14, 2026
Candidate	Raised	Spent	Cash on hand
Jim Risch (R)	$5,009,089	$5,081,714	$2,122,235
Todd Achilles (I)	$1,921,132	$1,733,606	$195,819
Source: Federal Election Commission

=== Polling ===
Aggregate polls

Source of poll aggregation	Dates administered	Dates updated	Jim Risch (R)	Todd Achilles (I)	Other/ Undecided (Note: Calculated by taking the difference of 100% and all other candidates combined.)	Margin
Silver Bulletin	through October 22, 2026	November 3, 2026	51.1%	35.1%	13.8%	Risch +16.0%

Poll source	Date(s) administered	Sample size (Note: Key: A – all adults RV – registered voters LV – likely voters V – unclear)	Margin of error	Jim Risch (R)	Todd Achilles (I)	Other	Undecided
VoteNexus Research (Note: Poll commissioned by Knock Every Door PAC and Achilles' campaign)	October 21–22, 2026	700 (LV)	± 4.5%	49%	43%	—	8%
Peak Insights (R)	October 13–15, 2026	500 (LV)	± 4.0%	54%	27%	9% (Note: Natalie Fleming (I) with 3%; Matt Loesby (L) with 2%; "None" with 4%)	10%
Peak Insights (R) (Note: Poll sponsored by Risch's campaign)	September 28–30, 2026	500 (LV)	± 4%	49%	24%	11% (Note: Natalie Fleming (I) with 3%,;Matt Loesby (L) with 2%; "None" with 6%)	15%
Advanced Targeting Research	September 13–16, 2026	700 (RV)	± 3.7%	39%	50%	—	11%
Advanced Targeting Research	September 13–16, 2026	700 (RV)	± 3.7%	39%	46%	5% (Note: Matt Loesby (L) with 5%)	11%
Peak Insights (R)	August 11–13, 2026	500 (LV)	± 4.0%	52%	18%	12% (Note: Natalie Fleming (I) with 9%; Matt Loesby (L) with 2%; "None" with 1%)	17%
The Bullfinch Group (Note: Poll sponsored by Achilles's campaign)	August 4–7, 2026	608 (LV)	± 3.9%	33%	38%	—	29%
The Bullfinch Group	August 4–7, 2026	608 (LV)	± 3.9%	34%	30%	4% (Note: Matt Loesby (L) with 4%)	32%
Change Research (D) (Note: Poll sponsored by John Stegner, Independent candidate for governor)	July 28–30, 2026	1,213 (LV)	± 3.0%				
Change Research (D)	July 28–30, 2026	1,213 (LV)	± 3.0%	45%	21%	11% (Note: Natalie Fleming (I) with 8%; "Would not vote" with 3%; Matt Loesby (L) with 2%)	22%
The Bullfinch Group	May 29 – June 1, 2026	774 (RV)	± 3.5%	40%	36%	—	24%
	May 19, 2026	Primary elections					
Public Policy Polling (I)	March 16–17, 2026	639 (RV)	± 3.9%	48%	34%	—	18%

Hypothetical polling

Jim Risch vs. David Roth vs. Todd Achilles

Poll source	Date(s) administered	Sample size (Note: Key: A – all adults RV – registered voters LV – likely voters V – unclear)	Margin of error	Jim Risch (R)	David Roth (D)	Todd Achilles (I)	Other	Undecided
Change Research (I) (Note: Poll sponsored by John Stegner, Independent candidate for governor)	July 28–30, 2026	1,213 (LV)	± 3.0%	43%	13%	19%	6% (Note: Natalie Fleming (I) with 3%; "Would not vote" with 2%; Matt Loesby (L) with 1%)	18%
Peak Insights (R)	June 6–7, 2026	500 (LV)	± 4.0%	55%	15%	7%	7% (Note: Fleming with 5%, Loesby with 2%)	14%

Jim Risch vs. David Roth

Poll source	Date(s) administered	Sample size	Margin of error	Jim Risch (R)	David Roth (D)	Undecided
The Bullfinch Group	May 29 – June 1, 2026	774 (RV)	± 3.5%	50%	33%	17%

=== Results ===
2026 United States Senate election in Idaho
Party	Candidate	Votes	%	±%
Republican	Jim Risch (incumbent)	402,983	56.50	–6.12
Independent	Todd Achilles	239,422	33.56	N/A
Independent	Natalie Fleming	50,134	7.03	+4.08
Libertarian	Matt Loesby	20,742	2.91	N/A
Total votes		713,281	100.0	N/A
Republican hold				

== See also ==
- 2026 Idaho elections

== Notes ==
Partisan clients
