= 2026 United States House of Representatives elections in Idaho =

- November 3, 2026

Both Idaho seats to the United States House of Representatives
	Majority party	Minority party
Party	Republican	Democratic
Last election	2	0
Seats won	2	0
Seat change	Steady	Steady
Popular vote	415,585	243,268
Percentage	58.37%	34.17%
Swing	▼8.15%	▲4.30%

Republican
40–50%
50–60%
60–70%
70–80%
80–90%
Democratic
50–60%
60–70%

The 2026 United States House of Representatives elections in Idaho were held on November 3, 2026, to elect the two U.S. representatives from the state of Idaho, one from both of the state's congressional districts. The elections coincided with the other elections to the House of Representatives, elections to the United States Senate, and various state and local elections. The primary elections took place on May 19, 2026.

== District 1 ==
2026 Idaho's 1st congressional district election
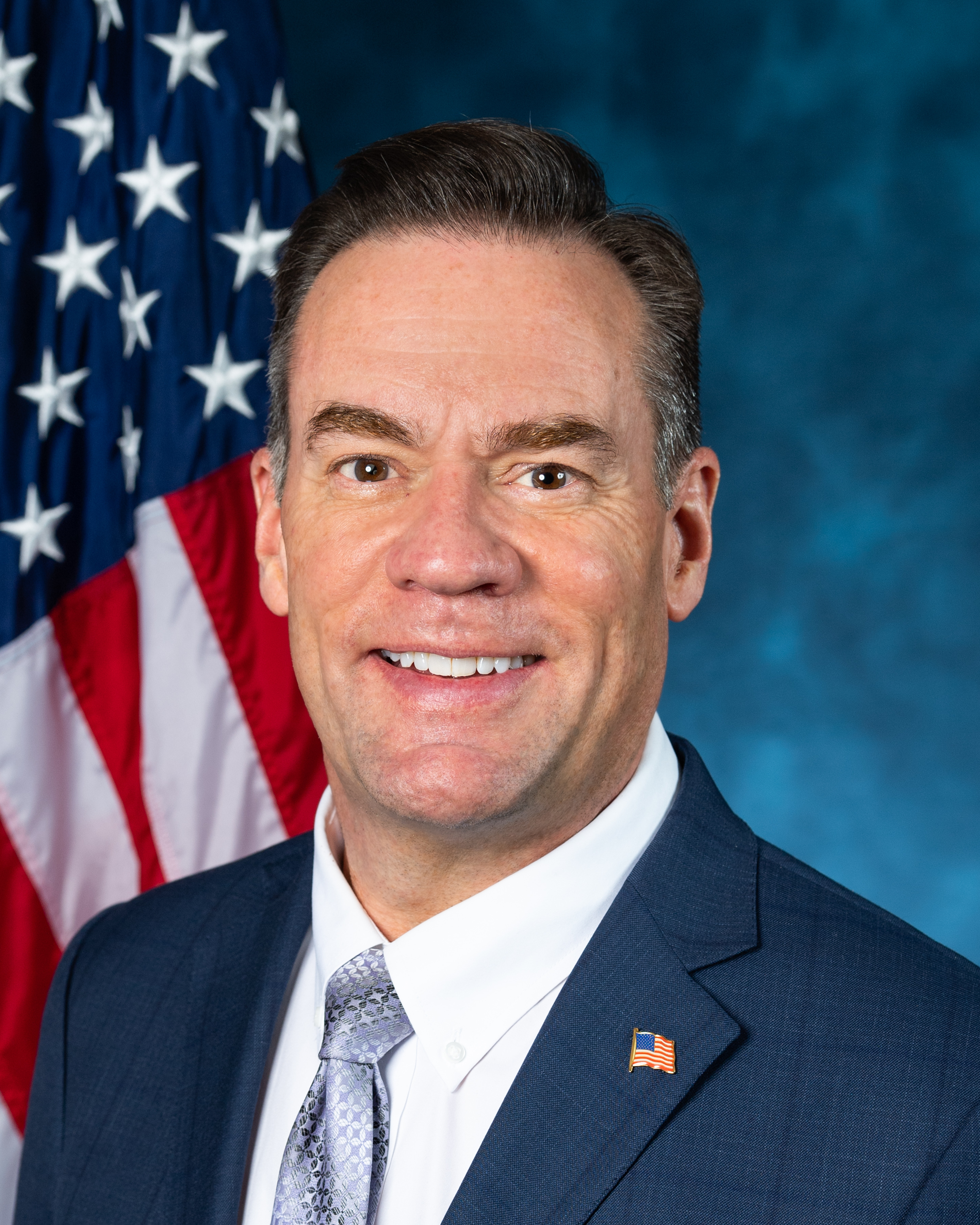

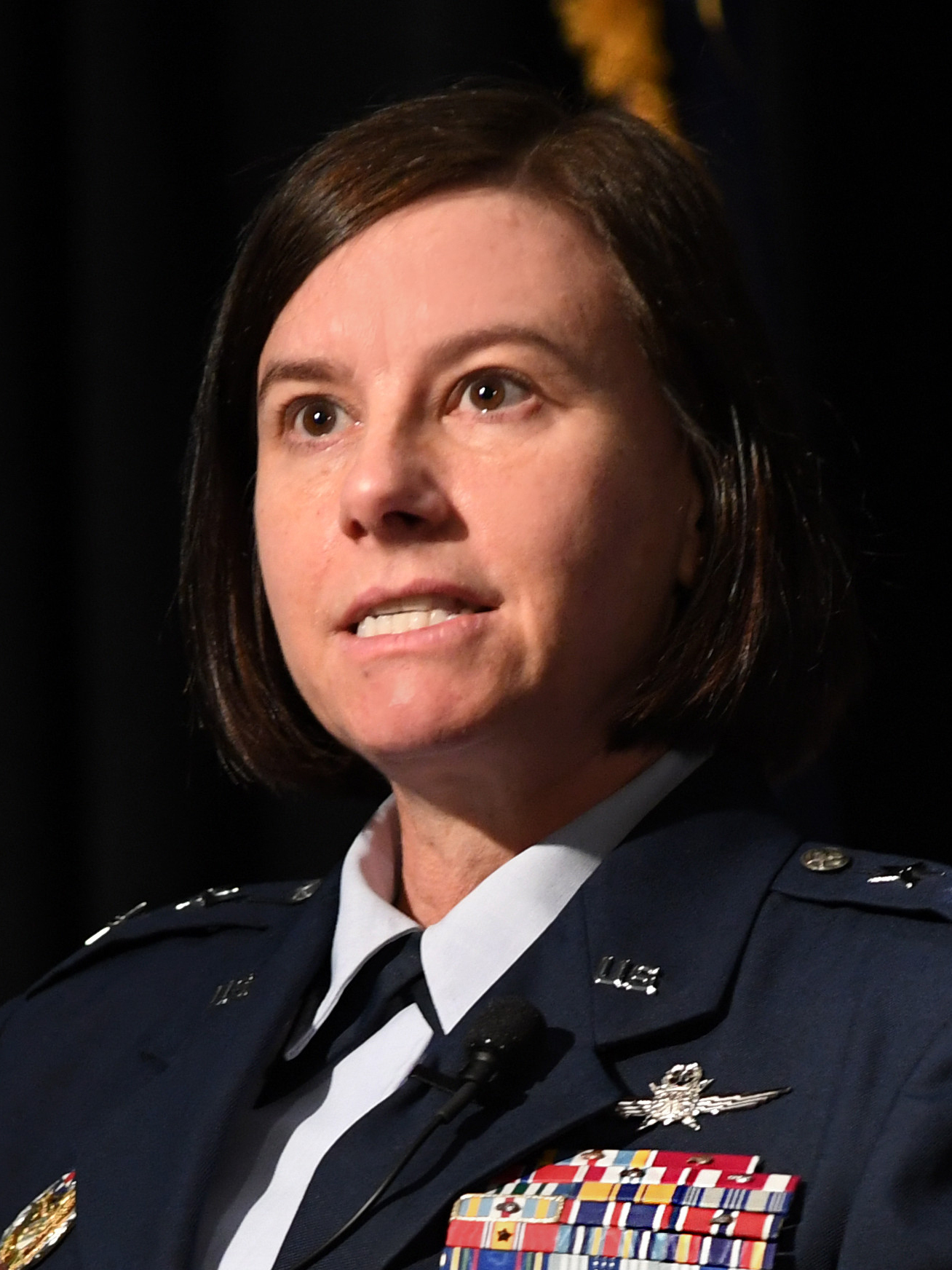
Nominee	Russ Fulcher	Kaylee Peterson	Sarah Zabel
Party	Republican	Democratic	Independent
Popular vote	244,717	110,112	23,106
Percentage	64.2%	28.9%	6.1%
- Fulcher: 40–50% 50–60% 60–70% 70–80%
U.S. Representative before election
Russ Fulcher
Republican
Elected U.S. Representative
Russ Fulcher
Republican

The 1st district takes in the Idaho Panhandle and the western Boise area. The incumbent is Republican Russ Fulcher, who was re-elected with 71.0% of the vote in 2024.

=== Republican primary ===
==== Nominee ====
- Russ Fulcher, incumbent U.S. representative

===== Eliminated in primary =====
- Andy Briner, kitchen designer
- Joseph Morrison, information security professional

==== Endorsements ====
Russ Fulcher

Executive branch officials

- Donald Trump, 45th and 47th president of the United States (2017–2021, 2025–present)

Organizations

- AIPAC
- Freedom Caucus Fund

==== Fundraising ====
Campaign finance reports as of April 29, 2026
Candidate	Raised	Spent	Cash on hand
Russ Fulcher (R)	$577,744	$498,678	$259,075
Source: Federal Election Commission

==== Results ====
Republican primary results
Party	Candidate	Votes	%
Republican	Russ Fulcher (incumbent)	100,104	78.2
Republican	Andy Briner	14,438	11.3
Republican	Joseph Morrison	13,407	10.5
Total votes		127,949	100.0

=== Democratic primary ===
==== Candidates ====
===== Nominee =====
- Kaylee Peterson, artisan jeweler and nominee for this district in 2022 and 2024

===== Eliminated in primary =====
- Ken Brungardt, retired painting contractor

==== Fundraising ====
Campaign finance reports as of April 29, 2026
Candidate	Raised	Spent	Cash on hand
Ken Brungardt (D)	$45,015	$42,296	$2,719
Kaylee Peterson (D)	$145,482	$134,248	$16,625
Source: Federal Election Commission

==== Results ====
Democratic primary results
Party	Candidate	Votes	%
Democratic	Kaylee Peterson	18,907	87.1
Democratic	Ken Brungardt	2,803	12.9
Total votes		21,710	100.0

=== Constitution primary ===
==== Candidates ====
===== Filed paperwork =====
- Brendan Gomez, nominee for this district in 2024

=== Independents ===
==== Candidates ====
===== Declared =====
- Sarah Zabel, author and retired U.S. Air Force major general

==== Fundraising ====
Campaign finance reports as of April 29, 2026
Candidate	Raised	Spent	Cash on hand
Sarah Zabel (I)	$41,408	$29,629	$11,779
Source: Federal Election Commission

=== General election ===
==== Predictions ====
Source	Ranking	As of
Decision Desk HQ	Safe R	July 14, 2026
The Cook Political Report	Solid R	February 6, 2025
Inside Elections	Solid R	March 7, 2025
Sabato's Crystal Ball	Safe R	April 10, 2025

==== Post-primary endorsements ====
Russ Fulcher (R)

Organizations

- U.S. Chamber of Commerce
Kaylee Peterson (D)

Labor unions

- National Education Association

Organizations

- National Women's Political Caucus
- National Organization for Women
Sarah Zabel (I)

Political parties

- Forward Party
- Reform Party

==== Fundraising ====
Campaign finance reports as of June 30, 2026
Candidate	Raised	Spent	Cash on hand
Russ Fulcher (R)	$662,615	$597,924	$244,700
Kaylee Peterson (D)	$181,024	$171,799	$14,616
Brendan Gomez (C)	$0	$0	$0
Sarah Zabel (I)	$81,497	$57,024	$24,473
Source: Federal Election Commission

==== Polling ====
Poll source	Date(s) administered	Sample size (Note: Key: A – all adults RV – registered voters LV – likely voters V – unclear)	Margin of error	Russ Fulcher (R)	Kaylee Peterson (D)	Sarah Zabel (I)	Other	Undecided
VoteNexus Research (Note: Poll commissioned by Knock Every Door PAC and the campaign of John Achilles, independent candidate for U.S. Senate)	October 21–22, 2026	(LV)	–	52%	26%	5%	6% (Note: Brendan Gomez (C) with 6%)	10%
Change Research (D) (Note: Poll conducted behalf of John Stegner's campaign, who is an independent running for Governor.)	July 28–30, 2026	606 (LV)	–	48%	27%	5%	2% (Note: "Would not vote" with 2%)	18%
Change Research (D)	July 28–30, 2026	606 (LV)	–	46%	–	26%	6% (Note: Brendan Gomez with 4%; "Would not vote" with 2%)	22%
SurveyUSA (Note: Poll conducted on behalf of Zabel's campaign)	July 7–14, 2026	480 (LV)	± 4.9%	45%	35%	6%	1% (Note: "Would not vote" with 1%)	14%

Hypothetical polling

Russ Fulcher vs. Kaylee Peterson

Poll source	Date(s) administered	Sample size	Margin of error	Russ Fulcher (R)	Kaylee Peterson (D)	Other	Undecided
SurveyUSA (I)	July 7–14, 2026	478 (LV)	± 4.9%	44%	39%	1%	16%

Russ Fulcher vs. Sarah Zabel

Poll source	Date(s) administered	Sample size	Margin of error	Russ Fulcher (R)	Sarah Zabel (I)	Other	Undecided
SurveyUSA (I)	July 7–14, 2026	478 (LV)	± 4.9%	39%	42%	3% (Note: "Would not vote" with 3%)	17%

==== Results ====
2026 Idaho's 1st congressional district election
Party	Candidate	Votes	%	±%
Republican	Russ Fulcher (incumbent)	244,717	64.2	–6.8
Democratic	Kaylee Peterson	110,112	28.9	+3.5
Independent	Sarah Zabel Peterson	23,106	6.1	N/A
Constitution	Brendan Gomez	3,421	0.9	–0.6
Total votes		381,356	100.0	

== District 2 ==
2026 Idaho's 2nd congressional district election
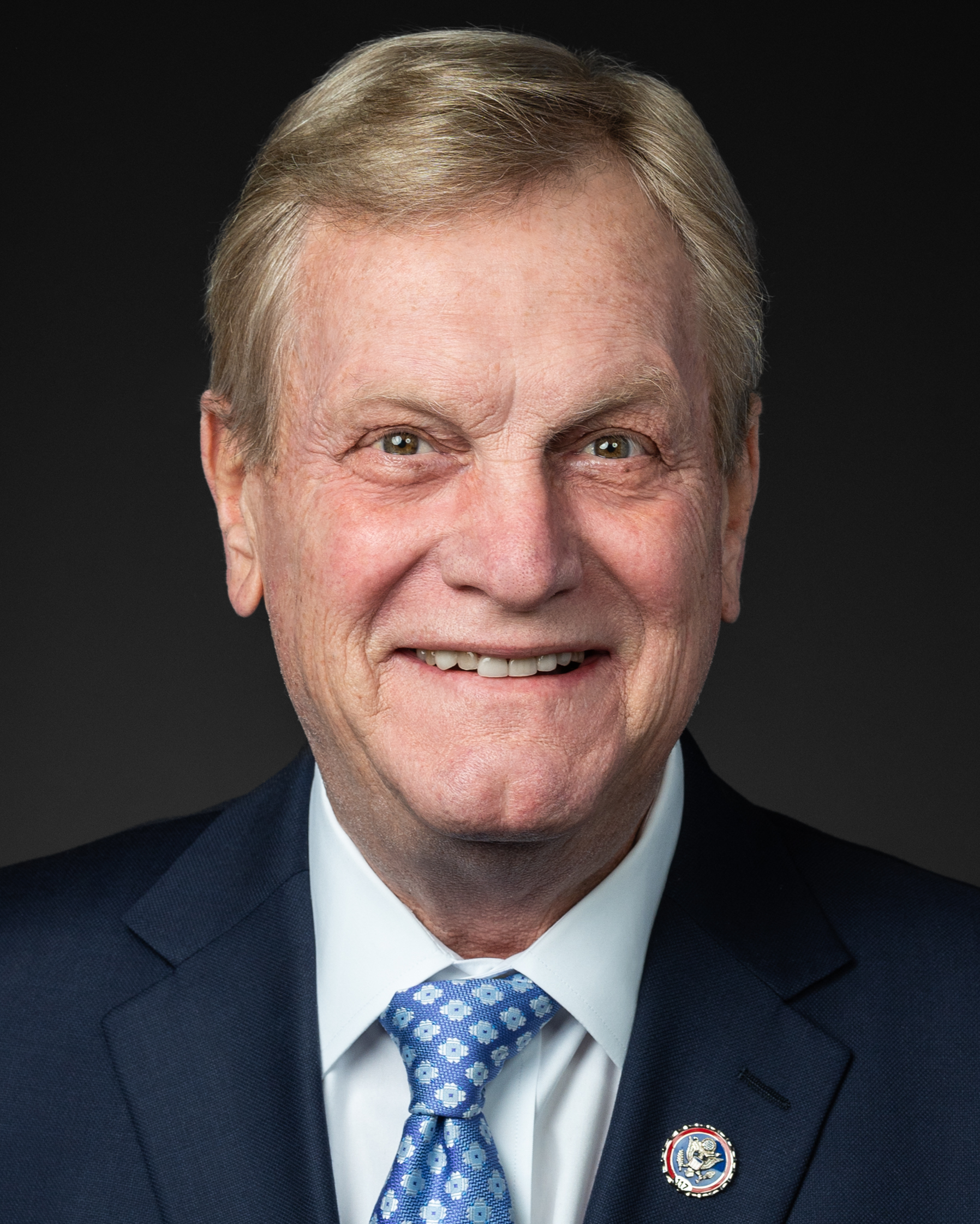

Nominee	Mike Simpson	Elinor Gilbreath
Party	Republican	Democratic
Popular vote	170,868	133,156
Percentage	51.7%	40.3%
- Simpson: 40–50% 60–70% 70–80% 80–90% Gilbreath: 50–60% 60–70%
U.S. Representative before election
Mike Simpson
Republican
Elected U.S. Representative
Mike Simpson
Republican

The 2nd district encompasses eastern and northern Boise, as well as Eastern Idaho. The incumbent is Republican Mike Simpson, who was re-elected with 61.4% of the vote in 2024.

=== Republican primary ===
==== Candidates ====
===== Nominee =====
- Mike Simpson, incumbent U.S. representative

===== Eliminated in primary =====
- Brian Keene, educator
- Perry Shumway, brand strategy manager

==== Endorsements ====
Mike Simpson

Executive branch officials

- Donald Trump, 45th and 47th president of the United States (2017–2021, 2025–present)

Organizations

- AIPAC
- Log Cabin Republicans

==== Fundraising ====
Campaign finance reports as of April 29, 2026
Candidate	Raised	Spent	Cash on hand
Perry Shumway (R)	$5,292	$2,836	$0
Mike Simpson (R)	$924,725	$607,181	$422,750
Source: Federal Election Commission

==== Results ====
Republican primary results
Party	Candidate	Votes	%
Republican	Mike Simpson (incumbent)	63,448	63.3
Republican	Brian Keene	20,975	20.9
Republican	Perry Shumway	15,802	15.8
Total votes		100,225	100.0

=== Democratic primary ===
==== Candidates ====
===== Nominee =====
- Elinor Gilbreath, lawyer

===== Eliminated in primary =====
- Julie Wiley, retired counselor

==== Fundraising ====
Campaign finance reports as of April 29, 2026
Candidate	Raised	Spent	Cash on hand
Elinor Gilbreath (D)	$68,749	$9,880	$58,869
Julie Wiley (D)	$30,477	$30,477	$0
Source: Federal Election Commission

==== Results ====
Democratic primary results
Party	Candidate	Votes	%
Democratic	Elinor Gilbreath	19,523	72.5
Democratic	Julie Wiley	7,411	27.5
Total votes		26,934	100.0

=== Libertarian primary ===
==== Candidates ====
===== Declared =====
- Will Johanson, engineer

=== Constitution primary ===
==== Candidates ====
===== Declared =====
- Carta Sierra, nominee for this district in 2024

=== Independents ===
==== Candidates ====
===== Declared =====
- Emre Houser, small business owner
- Tripp Hutchinson, Ketchum city councilor

=== General election ===
==== Predictions ====
Source	Ranking	As of
Decision Desk HQ	Safe R	July 14, 2026
The Cook Political Report	Solid R	February 6, 2025
Inside Elections	Solid R	March 7, 2025
Sabato's Crystal Ball	Safe R	April 10, 2025

==== Post-primary endorsements ====
Mike Simpson (R)

Organizations

- U.S. Chamber of Commerce

==== Fundraising ====
Campaign finance reports as of June 30, 2026
Candidate	Raised	Spent	Cash on hand
Mike Simpson (R)	$1,118,093	$793,940	$429,359
Ellie Gilbreath (D)	$106,892	$35,729	$71,163
Will Johanson (L)	$0	$0	$0
Carta Sierra (C)	$0	$0	$0
Emre Houser (I)	$0	$0	$0
Tripp Hutchinson (I)	$7,565	$1,578	$6,963
Source: Federal Election Commission

==== Polling ====
Poll source	Date(s) administered	Sample size	Margin of error	Mike Simpson (R)	Ellie Gilbreath (D)	Other	Undecided
VoteNexus Research	October 21–22, 2026	(LV)	–	46%	31%	12% (Note: Emre Houser (I) & Tripp Hutchinson (I) with 5%; Will Johanson (L) with 2%)	12%

==== Results ====
2026 Idaho's 2nd congressional district election
Party	Candidate	Votes	%	±%
Republican	Mike Simpson (incumbent)	170,868	51.7	–9.7
Democratic	Ellie Gilbreath	133,156	40.3	+9.0
Independent	Tripp Hutchinson	11,641	3.5	N/A
Independent	Emre Houser	7,857	2.4	N/A
Libertarian	Will Johanson	7,145	2.2	–3.0
Total votes		330,667	100.0	

== Notes ==
Partisan clients
