= 2024 United States House of Representatives elections in Idaho =

- November 5, 2024

Both Idaho seats to the United States House of Representatives
	Majority party	Minority party
Party	Republican	Democratic
Last election	2	0
Seats won	2	0
Seat change	Steady	Steady
Popular vote	581,168	244,885
Percentage	66.52%	28.03%
Swing	▼1.22%	▼2.98%

Republican
50–60%
60–70%
70–80%
80–90%
Democratic
40–50%
50–60%

The 2024 United States House of Representatives elections in Idaho were held on November 5, 2024, to elect the two U.S. representatives from the State of Idaho, one from both of the state's congressional districts. The elections coincided with the 2024 U.S. presidential election, as well as other elections to the House of Representatives, elections to the United States Senate, and various state and local elections. The primary elections took place on May 21, 2024.

== Overview ==
=== Statewide ===
Party	Candi- dates	Votes		Seats		
Party	Candi- dates	No.	%	No.	+/–	%
Republican Party	2	581,168	66.52%	2	Steady	100%
Democratic Party	2	244,885	28.03%	0	Steady	0%
Libertarian Party	2	30,904	3.54%	0	Steady	0%
Constitution Party	2	16,737	1.92%	0	Steady	0%
Total	8	873,694	100%	2	Steady	100%

Popular vote
Republican	66.52%
Democratic	28.03%
Libertarian	3.54%
Constitution	1.92%

House seats
Republican	100.0%

=== District ===
District	Republican		Democratic		Others		Total		Result
District	Votes	%	Votes	%	Votes	%	Votes	%	Result
District 1	331,049	71.01%	118,656	25.45%	16,527	3.54%	466,232	100.0%	Republican hold
District 2	250,119	61.38%	126,229	30.98%	31,114	7.64%	407,462	100.0%	Republican hold
Total	581,168	66.52%	244,885	28.03%	47,641	5.45%	873,694	100.0%	

== District 1 ==
2024 Idaho's 1st congressional district election
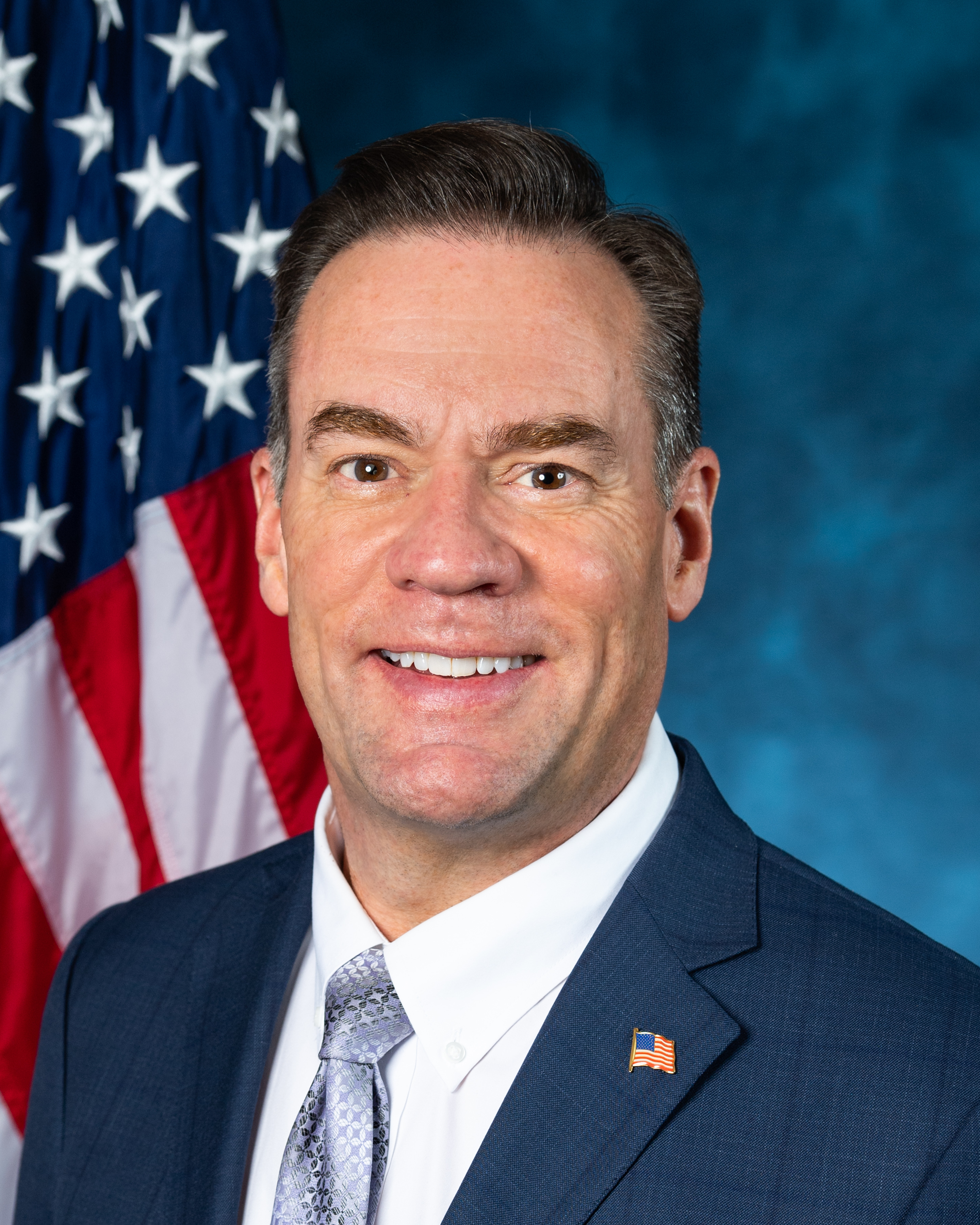

Nominee	Russ Fulcher	Kaylee Peterson
Party	Republican	Democratic
Popular vote	331,049	118,656
Percentage	71.0%	25.4%
- Fulcher: 40–50% 50–60% 60–70% 70–80% 80–90% >90% Peterson: 50–60% 60–70% 70–80%
U.S. Representative before election
Russ Fulcher
Republican
Elected U.S. Representative
Russ Fulcher
Republican

The 1st district takes in the Idaho Panhandle and the western Boise area. The incumbent is Republican Russ Fulcher, who was re-elected with 71.3% of the vote in 2022.

=== Republican primary ===
==== Nominee ====
- Russ Fulcher, incumbent U.S. Representative

==== Endorsements ====
Russ Fulcher

Organizations

- AIPAC
- National Rifle Association Political Victory Fund

==== Fundraising ====
Campaign finance reports as of May 1, 2024
Candidate	Raised	Spent	Cash on hand
Russ Fulcher (R)	$393,599	$276,097	$286,788
Source: Federal Election Commission

==== Results ====
Republican primary results
Party	Candidate	Votes	%
Republican	Russ Fulcher (incumbent)	109,067	100.00%
Total votes		109,067	100.00%

=== Democratic primary ===
==== Nominee ====
- Kaylee Peterson, president of Idaho Young Democrats and nominee for this district in 2022

==== Endorsements ====
Kaylee Peterson

Organizations

- Vote Common Good
- Vote Mama

==== Fundraising ====
Campaign finance reports as of May 1, 2024
Candidate	Raised	Spent	Cash on hand
Kaylee Peterson (D)	$82,946	$63,093	$22,561
Source: Federal Election Commission

==== Results ====
Democratic primary results
Party	Candidate	Votes	%
Democratic	Kaylee Peterson	13,982	100.00%
Total votes		13,982	100.00%

=== Libertarian primary ===
==== Nominee ====
- Matt Loesby (Libertarian), software developer and region 2 chair for the Idaho Libertarian Party

=== Constitution primary ===
==== Nominee ====
- Brendan Gomez (Constitution)

=== General election ===
==== Predictions ====
Source	Ranking	As of
The Cook Political Report	Solid R	October 31, 2023
Inside Elections	Solid R	October 27, 2023
Sabato's Crystal Ball	Safe R	October 26, 2023
Elections Daily	Safe R	October 26, 2023
CNalysis	Solid R	November 16, 2023

==== Results ====
2024 Idaho's 1st congressional district election
Party	Candidate	Votes	%
Republican	Russ Fulcher (incumbent)	331,049	71.0
Democratic	Kaylee Peterson	118,656	25.4
Libertarian	Matt Loesby	9,594	2.1
Constitution	Brendan Gomez	6,933	1.5
Total votes		466,232	100.0
Republican hold			

== District 2 ==
2024 Idaho's 2nd congressional district election
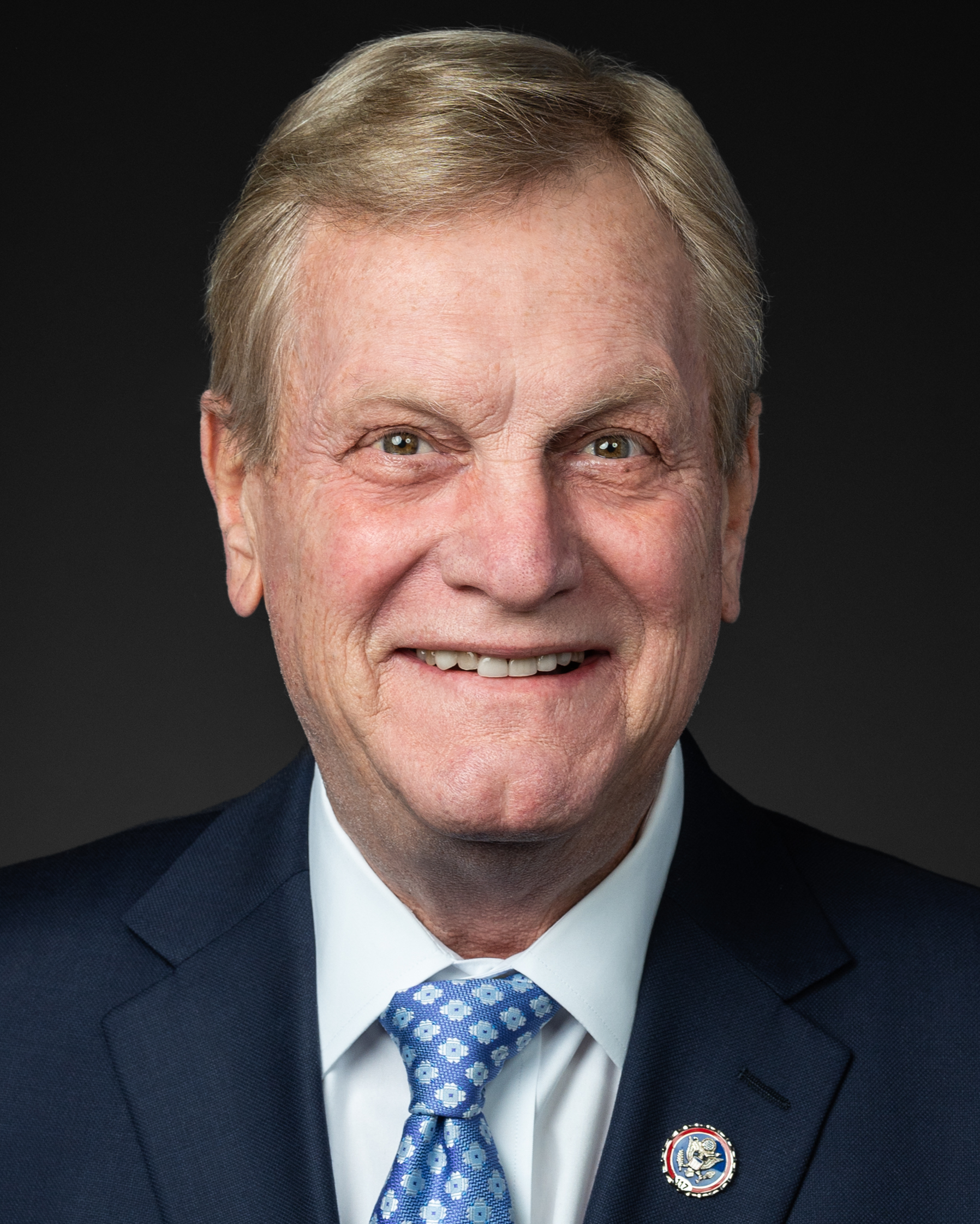

Nominee	Mike Simpson	David Roth	Todd Corsetti
Party	Republican	Democratic	Libertarian
Popular vote	250,119	126,229	21,310
Percentage	61.4%	31.0%	5.2%
- Simpson: 50–60% 60–70% 70–80% 80–90% >90% Roth: 40–50% 50–60% 60–70% 70–80% 80–90% No votes
U.S. Representative before election
Mike Simpson
Republican
Elected U.S. Representative
Mike Simpson
Republican

The 2nd district encompasses eastern and northern Boise, as well as Eastern Idaho. The incumbent is Republican Mike Simpson, who was re-elected with 63.6% of the vote in 2022.

=== Republican primary ===
==== Nominee ====
- Mike Simpson, incumbent U.S. representative

==== Eliminated in primary ====
- Scott Cleveland, financial advisor and independent candidate for U.S. Senate in 2022
- Sean Higgins, IT professional

==== Endorsements ====
Mike Simpson

Organizations

- AIPAC
- ClearPath Action Fund
- National Rifle Association Political Victory Fund
- National Right to Life Committee

==== Fundraising ====
Campaign finance reports as of May 1, 2024
Candidate	Raised	Spent	Cash on hand
Scott Cleveland (R)	$100,266	$83,725	$16,541
Sean Higgins (R)	$5,364 (Note: $5,000 of this total was self-funded by Higgins)	$1,021	$4,343
Mike Simpson (R)	$1,024,864	$552,233	$611,031
Source: Federal Election Commission

==== Results ====
2024 GOP primary results by county: Simpson: 40–50%; 50–60%; 60–70%; 70–80%; Cleveland: 40–50%

Republican primary results
Party	Candidate	Votes	%
Republican	Mike Simpson (incumbent)	53,476	54.7%
Republican	Scott Cleveland	35,036	35.8%
Republican	Sean Higgins	9,333	9.5%
Total votes		97,845	100.00%

=== Democratic primary ===
==== Nominee ====
- David Roth, realtor and nominee for U.S. Senate in 2022

==== Endorsements ====
David Roth

Organizations

- Vote Common Good

==== Fundraising ====
Campaign finance reports as of May 1, 2024
Candidate	Raised	Spent	Cash on hand
David Roth (D)	$61,159	$53,384	$6,242
Source: Federal Election Commission

==== Results ====
Democratic primary results
Party	Candidate	Votes	%
Democratic	David Roth	17,234	100.00%
Total votes		17,234	100.00%

=== Libertarian primary ===
==== Nominee ====
- Todd Corsetti, retired engineering manager

=== Constitution primary ===
==== Nominee ====
- Carta Sierra (Idaho Lorax), paralegal and perennial candidate

==== Eliminated in primary ====
- Pro-Life, strawberry farmer and perennial candidate

==== Results ====
Constitution primary results
Party	Candidate	Votes	%
Constitution	Carta Sierra (Idaho Lorax)	102	51.0%
Constitution	Pro-Life	98	49.0%
Total votes		200	100.00%

=== General election ===
==== Predictions ====
Source	Ranking	As of
The Cook Political Report	Solid R	October 31, 2023
Inside Elections	Solid R	October 27, 2023
Sabato's Crystal Ball	Safe R	October 26, 2023
Elections Daily	Safe R	October 26, 2023
CNalysis	Solid R	November 16, 2023

==== Results ====
2024 Idaho's 2nd congressional district election
Party	Candidate	Votes	%
Republican	Mike Simpson (incumbent)	250,119	61.4
Democratic	David Roth	126,229	31.0
Libertarian	Todd Corsetti	21,310	5.2
Constitution	Carta Sierra	9,804	2.4
Total votes		407,462	100.0
Republican hold			
