= 2022 United States House of Representatives elections in Idaho =

- November 8, 2022

All 2 Idaho seats to the United States House of Representatives
	Majority party	Minority party
Party	Republican	Democratic
Last election	2	0
Seats won	2	0
Seat change	Steady	Steady
Popular vote	395,351	180,997
Percentage	67.74%	31.01%
Swing	▲1.68%	▲0.94%

Republican
50–60%
60–70%
70–80%
80–90%
>90%
Democratic
50–60%
60–70%

The 2022 United States House of Representatives elections in Idaho were held on November 8, 2022, to elect the two U.S. representatives from the state of Idaho, one from each of the state's congressional districts. The elections coincided with other elections to the House of Representatives, elections to the United States Senate, and various state and local elections.

== Overview ==
District	Republican		Democratic		Others		Total		Result
District	Votes	%	Votes	%	Votes	%	Votes	%	Result
District 1	222,901	71.34%	82,261	26.33%	7,280	2.33%	312,442	100.00%	Republican hold
District 2	172,450	63.59%	98,736	36.41%	0	0.00%	271,186	100.00%	Republican hold
Total	395,351	67.74%	180,997	31.01%	7,280	1.25%	583,628	100.00%	

Popular vote
Republican	67.74%
Democratic	31.01%
Other	1.25%

House seats
Republican	100.00%

== District 1 ==
2022 Idaho's 1st congressional district election
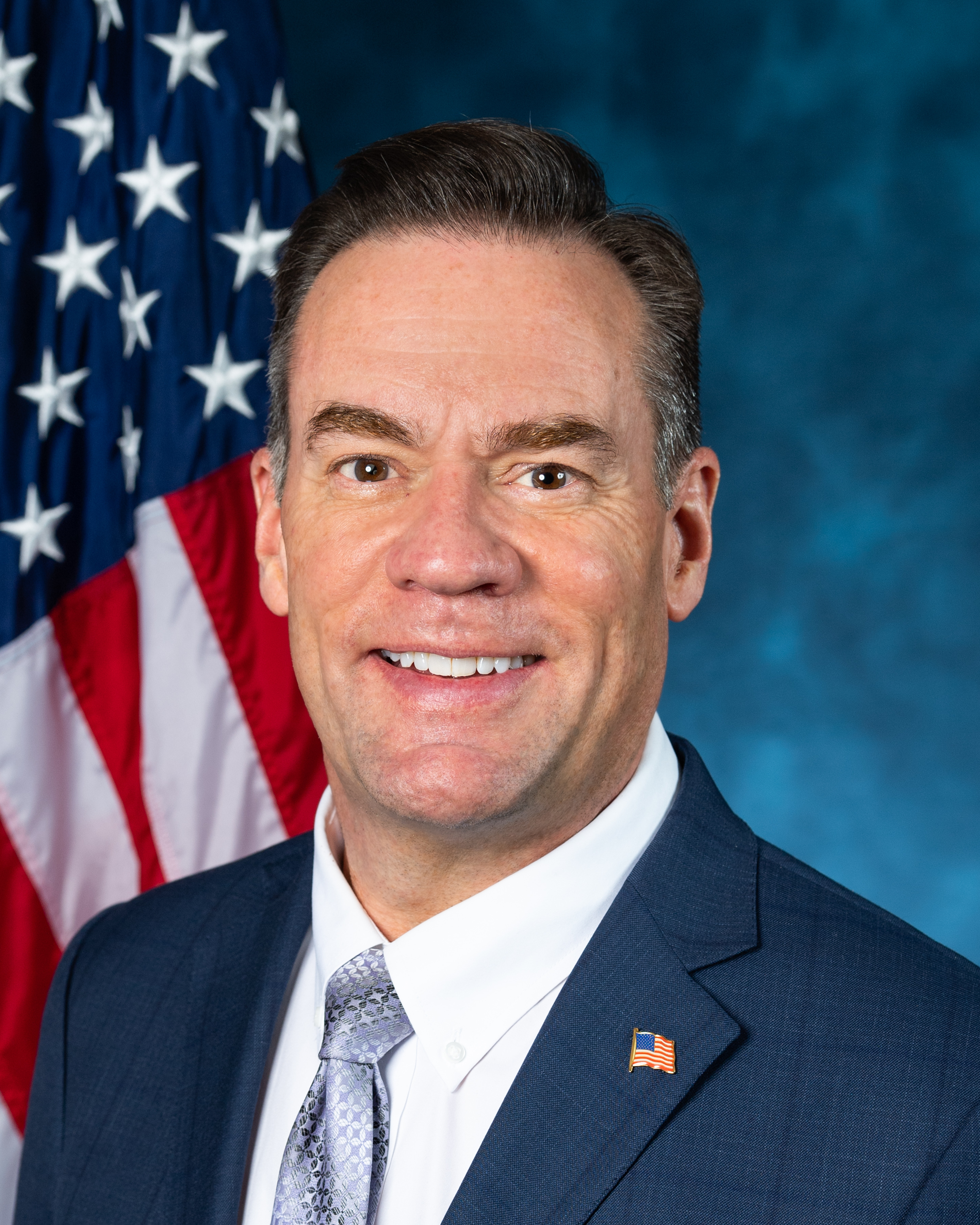

Nominee	Russ Fulcher	Kaylee Peterson
Party	Republican	Democratic
Popular vote	222,901	82,261
Percentage	71.3%	26.3%
- County results Fulcher: 50–60% 60–70% 70–80% 80–90%
U.S. Representative before election
Russ Fulcher
Republican
Elected U.S. Representative
Russ Fulcher
Republican

The 1st district takes in the Idaho Panhandle and the western Boise area. The incumbent was Republican Russ Fulcher, who was re-elected with 67.8% of the vote in 2020.

=== Republican primary ===
==== Candidates ====
===== Nominee =====
- Russ Fulcher, incumbent U.S. representative

===== Withdrew =====
- Brian Lenney

==== Endorsements ====
Russ Fulcher

Executive branch officials

- Donald Trump, former president of the United States (2017–2021)

==== Results ====
Republican primary results
Party	Candidate	Votes	%
Republican	Russ Fulcher (incumbent)	126,528	100.0
Total votes		126,528	100.0

=== Democratic primary ===
==== Candidates ====
===== Nominee =====
- Kaylee Peterson

==== Results ====
Democratic primary results
Party	Candidate	Votes	%
Democratic	Kaylee Peterson	15,057	100.0
Total votes		15,057	100.0

=== Libertarian primary ===
==== Candidates ====
===== Replacement nominee =====
- Darian Drake

===== Withdrew after nomination =====
- Joe Evans, U.S. Army veteran and nominee for this district in 2020

==== Endorsements ====
Joe Evans

Political parties

- Libertarian Party of Idaho

==== Results ====
Libertarian primary results
Party	Candidate	Votes	%
Libertarian	Joe Evans	489	100.0
Total votes		489	100.0

=== General election ===
==== Predictions ====
Source	Ranking	As of
The Cook Political Report	Solid R	November 16, 2021
Inside Elections	Solid R	December 22, 2021
Sabato's Crystal Ball	Safe R	November 17, 2021
Politico	Solid R	April 5, 2022
RCP	Safe R	June 9, 2022
Fox News	Solid R	July 11, 2022
DDHQ	Solid R	July 20, 2022
538	Solid R	June 30, 2022

==== Results ====
2022 Idaho's 1st congressional district election
Party	Candidate	Votes	%
Republican	Russ Fulcher (incumbent)	222,901	71.3
Democratic	Kaylee Peterson	82,261	26.3
Libertarian	Darian Drake	7,280	2.3
Total votes		312,442	100.0
Republican hold			

== District 2 ==
2022 Idaho's 2nd congressional district election
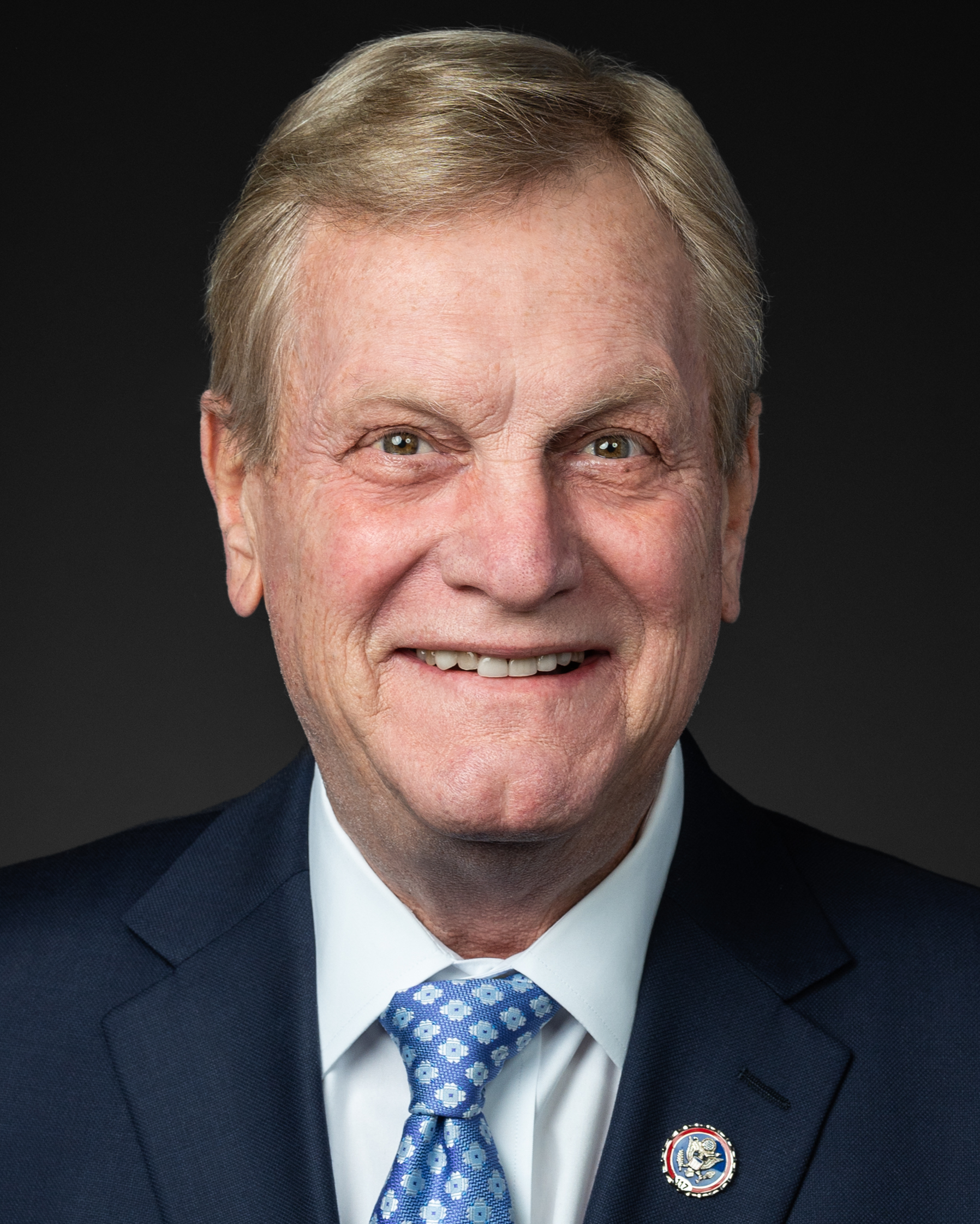

Nominee	Mike Simpson	Wendy Norman
Party	Republican	Democratic
Popular vote	172,448	98,736
Percentage	63.6%	36.4%
- County results Simpson: 60–70% 70–80% 80–90% >90% Norman: 50–60% 60–70%
U.S. Representative before election
Mike Simpson
Republican
Elected U.S. Representative
Mike Simpson
Republican

The 2nd district encompasses eastern and northern Boise, as well as Eastern Idaho. The incumbent was Republican Mike Simpson, who was re-elected with 64.1% of the vote in 2020.

=== Republican primary ===
==== Candidates ====
===== Nominee =====
- Mike Simpson, incumbent U.S. representative

===== Eliminated in primary =====
- Flint Christensen
- Daniel Algiers Lucas Levy
- Chris Porter
- Bryan Smith, attorney, businessman, and candidate for this district in 2014

===== Withdrawn =====
- Matthew Sather

==== Endorsements ====
Mike Simpson

Organizations

- National Rifle Association-Political Victory Fund
Bryan Smith

Organizations

- American Conservative Union

==== Results ====
GOP Primary Results: Simpson: 40–50%; 50–60%; 60–70%; 70–80%; Smith: 40–50%

Republican primary results
Party	Candidate	Votes	%
Republican	Mike Simpson (incumbent)	67,177	54.6
Republican	Bryan Smith	40,267	32.7
Republican	Flint Christensen	7,113	5.8
Republican	Chris Porter	6,357	5.2
Republican	Daniel Levy	2,185	1.8
Total votes		123,099	100.0

=== Democratic primary ===
==== Candidates ====
===== Nominee =====
- Wendy Norman, teacher

==== Results ====
Democratic primary results
Party	Candidate	Votes	%
Democratic	Wendy Norman	17,150	100.0
Total votes		17,150	100.0

=== General election ===
==== Predictions ====
Source	Ranking	As of
The Cook Political Report	Solid R	November 16, 2021
Inside Elections	Solid R	December 22, 2021
Sabato's Crystal Ball	Safe R	November 17, 2021
Politico	Solid R	April 5, 2022
RCP	Safe R	June 9, 2022
Fox News	Solid R	July 11, 2022
DDHQ	Solid R	July 20, 2022
538	Solid R	June 30, 2022

==== Results ====
2022 Idaho's 2nd congressional district election
Party	Candidate	Votes	%
Republican	Mike Simpson (incumbent)	172,450	63.6
Democratic	Wendy Norman	98,736	36.4
Total votes		271,186	100.0
Republican hold			
