= 2022 United States Senate election in Idaho =

- November 8, 2022
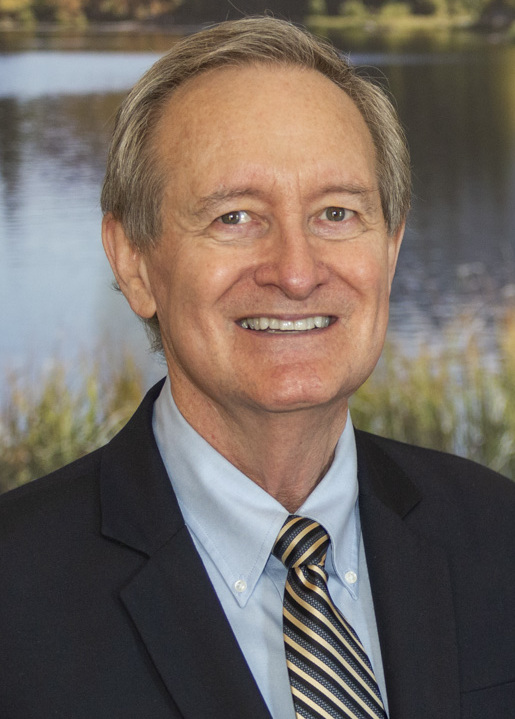

Nominee	Mike Crapo	David Roth	Scott Cleveland
Party	Republican	Democratic	Independent
Popular vote	358,539	169,808	49,917
Percentage	60.68%	28.74%	8.45%
- Crapo: 40–50% 50–60% 60–70% 70–80% 80–90% Roth: 50–60% 60–70%
U.S. senator before election
Mike Crapo
Republican
Elected U.S. Senator
Mike Crapo
Republican

The 2022 United States Senate election in Idaho was held on November 8, 2022, to elect a member of the United States Senate to represent the state of Idaho. Incumbent Republican Senator Mike Crapo was first elected in 1998 and ran for re-election to a fifth term in office. Primary elections were held on May 17, 2022. Crapo easily won renomination, while former Idaho House of Representatives candidate David Roth won the Democratic primary with 57.8% of the vote. Crapo ultimately won the election, but this was the lowest share of the vote he had ever received for this seat, partially because of an independent candidate, Scott Cleveland, taking away some of his votes.

The election resulted in both the worst performance by a Republican, and the best performance by a Democrat in the Class 3 seat since 1992. It was also the best performance by a third-party or independent candidate for a Senate seat in Idaho since 1926.

== Republican primary ==
=== Candidates ===
==== Nominee ====
- Mike Crapo, incumbent U.S. senator

==== Eliminated in primary ====
- Brenda Bourn
- Natalie Fleming, independent candidate for Idaho's 1st congressional district in 2018 and U.S. Senate in 2020
- Scott Trotter, business owner
- Ramont Turnbull, development manager

==== Failed to file ====
- Mike Little, Iraq War veteran

==== Withdrawn ====
- Jeremy Gilbert, law firm operations director and U.S. Army veteran

=== Endorsements ===
Mike Crapo

Former U.S. executive branch officials

- Donald Trump, 45th president of the United States (2017–2021)

Organizations

- Citizens for Responsible Energy Solutions
- National Rifle Association - Political Victory Fund
- Pro-Israel America

=== Results ===
Results by county Crapo: 50–60%; 60–70%; 70–80%; 80–90%

Republican primary results
Party	Candidate	Votes	%
Republican	Mike Crapo (incumbent)	177,906	67.13%
Republican	Scott Trotter	27,699	10.45%
Republican	Brenda Bourn	21,612	8.16%
Republican	Ramont Turnbull	20,883	7.88%
Republican	Natalie Fleming	16,902	6.38%
Total votes		265,002	100.0%

== Democratic primary ==
=== Candidates ===
==== Nominee ====
- David Roth, nominee for state representative from the 33rd district in 2020

==== Eliminated in primary ====
- Ben Pursley, real estate developer

=== Results ===
Results by county Roth: 50–60%; 60–70%; 70–80%; 90–100%; Pursley: 50–60%

Democratic primary results
Party	Candidate	Votes	%
Democratic	David Roth	19,160	57.80%
Democratic	Ben Pursley	13,987	42.20%
Total votes		33,147	100.0%

== Libertarian primary ==
=== Candidates ===
==== Nominee ====
- Idaho Sierra Law, environmental activist and perennial candidate (Note: Nominee for state representative from the 29th district in 2012 and 2018; nominee for state senator from the 29th district in 2016; nominee for Idaho's 2nd congressional district in 2020)

=== Results ===
Libertarian primary results
Party	Candidate	Votes	%
Libertarian	Idaho Sierra Law	673	100.0%
Total votes		673	100.0%

== Constitution primary ==
=== Candidates ===
==== Nominee ====
- Ray Writz, nominee for U.S. Senate in 2016 and 2020

=== Results ===
Constitution primary results
Party	Candidate	Votes	%
Constitution	Ray Writz	520	100.0%
Total votes		520	100.0%

== Independents ==
=== Candidates ===
==== Declared ====
- Scott Cleveland, entrepreneur

== General election ==
=== Predictions ===
Source	Ranking	As of
The Cook Political Report	Solid R	March 4, 2022
Inside Elections	Solid R	April 1, 2022
Sabato's Crystal Ball	Safe R	March 1, 2022
Politico	Solid R	April 1, 2022
RCP	Safe R	February 24, 2022
Fox News	Solid R	May 12, 2022
DDHQ	Solid R	July 20, 2022
538	Solid R	June 30, 2022
The Economist	Safe R	September 7, 2022

=== Post-primary endorsements ===
Mike Crapo (R)

Organizations

- AIPAC
- Associated General Contractors of America
- ClearPath Action Fund
- Humane Society Legislative Fund
- National Right to Life Committee
David Roth (D)

Organizations

- Stonewall Democrats
- Vote Common Good

Newspapers

- Idaho Statesman

=== Debates ===
2022 United States Senate general election in Idaho debates
No.	Date	Host	Moderator	Link	Republican	Democratic	Independent
Key: P Participant A Absent N Non-invitee I Invitee W Withdrawn							
Key: P Participant A Absent N Non-invitee I Invitee W Withdrawn					Mike Crapo	David Roth	Scott Clevland
1	Oct. 5, 2022	Idaho Public Television	Melissa Davlin		P	P	P

=== Results ===
2022 United States Senate election in Idaho
Party	Candidate	Votes	%	±%
Republican	Mike Crapo (incumbent)	358,539	60.68%	−5.45%
Democratic	David Roth	169,808	28.74%	+1.01%
Independent	Scott Cleveland	49,917	8.45%	N/A
Constitution	Ray Writz	8,500	1.44%	−4.70%
Libertarian	Idaho Sierra Law	4,126	0.70%	N/A
Total votes		590,890	100.0%	N/A
Republican hold				

==== By county ====
By county

County	Mike Crapo Republican		David Roth Democratic		Scott Cleveland Independent		Ray Writz Constitution		Idaho Sierra Law Libertarian		Margin		Total votes
County	#	%	#	%	#	%	#	%	#	%	#	%	Total votes
Ada	87,579	47.46	76,656	41.54	17,551	9.51	1,561	0.85	1,174	0.64	10,923	5.92	184,521
Adams	1,425	70.86	367	18.25	150	7.46	56	2.78	13	0.65	1,058	52.61	2,011
Bannock	14,480	56.91	9,054	35.59	1,299	5.11	377	1.48	233	0.92	5,426	21.33	25,443
Bear Lake	1,871	83.38	196	8.73	87	3.88	70	3.12	20	0.89	1,675	74.64	2,244
Benewah	2,662	76.85	503	14.52	151	4.36	110	3.18	38	1.10	2,159	62.33	3,464
Bingham	9,491	77.10	1,750	14.22	771	6.26	223	1.81	75	0.61	7,741	62.88	12,310
Blaine	3,121	32.21	6,006	61.99	336	3.47	99	1.02	127	1.31	-2,885	-29.78	9,689
Boise	2,172	63.19	673	19.58	478	13.91	83	2.41	31	0.90	1,499	43.61	3,437
Bonner	13,348	64.29	5,467	26.33	1,502	7.23	300	1.45	144	0.69	7,881	37.96	20,761
Bonneville	24,579	69.36	7,866	22.20	2,248	6.34	520	1.47	226	0.64	16,713	47.16	35,439
Boundary	3,939	75.75	732	14.08	403	7.75	93	1.79	33	0.63	3,207	61.67	5,200
Butte	783	78.85	114	11.48	59	5.94	28	2.82	9	0.91	669	67.37	993
Camas	367	71.12	95	18.41	29	5.62	21	4.07	4	0.78	272	52.71	516
Canyon	36,558	62.78	12,961	22.26	7,299	12.53	976	1.68	435	0.75	23,597	40.52	58,229
Caribou	1,735	81.99	205	9.69	109	5.15	54	2.55	13	0.61	1,530	72.31	2,116
Cassia	4,619	79.69	584	10.08	398	6.87	154	2.66	41	0.71	4,035	69.62	5,796
Clark	161	78.16	19	9.22	15	7.28	9	4.37	2	0.97	142	68.93	206
Clearwater	2,389	76.57	526	16.86	119	3.81	72	2.31	14	0.45	1,863	59.71	3,120
Custer	1,447	72.03	359	17.87	113	5.62	79	3.93	11	0.55	1,088	54.16	2,009
Elmore	4,380	66.31	1,334	20.20	688	10.42	141	2.13	62	0.94	3,046	46.12	6,605
Franklin	3,588	83.34	302	7.02	257	5.97	135	3.14	23	0.53	3,286	76.33	4,305
Fremont	3,399	80.17	480	11.32	247	5.83	87	2.05	27	0.64	2,919	{68.84	4,240
Gem	5,118	67.60	1,076	14.21	1,173	15.49	133	1.76	71	0.94	3,945	52.11 (Note: Compares margin over Cleveland.)	7,571
Gooding	2,941	72.67	609	15.05	374	9.24	91	2.25	32	0.79	2,332	57.62	4,047
Idaho	5,741	76.91	962	12.89	535	7.17	177	2.37	50	0.67	4,779	64.02	7,465
Jefferson	7,396	81.33	836	9.19	585	6.43	223	2.45	54	0.59	6,560	72.14	9,094
Jerome	3,506	72.07	803	16.51	421	8.65	102	2.10	33	0.68	2,703	55.56	4,865
Kootenai	42,115	67.67	13,404	21.54	5,515	8.86	836	1.34	369	0.59	28,711	46.13	62,239
Latah	7,484	49.95	6,881	45.92	361	2.41	133	0.89	125	0.83	603	4.02	14,984
Lemhi	2,690	73.62	674	18.45	175	4.79	82	2.24	33	0.90	2,016	55.17	3,654
Lewis	1,097	80.72	176	12.95	58	4.27	26	1.91	2	0.15	921	67.77	1,359
Lincoln	978	74.43	221	16.82	76	5.78	27	2.05	12	0.91	757	57.61	1,314
Madison	6,533	78.94	972	11.74	519	6.27	195	2.36	57	0.69	5,561	67.19	8,276
Minidoka	3,623	76.89	592	12.56	366	7.77	99	2.10	32	0.68	3,031	64.33	4,712
Nez Perce	8,986	66.83	3,628	26.98	639	4.75	100	0.74	93	0.69	5,358	39.85	13,446
Oneida	1,330	83.07	117	7.31	99	6.18	44	2.75	11	0.69	1,213	75.77	1,601
Owyhee	2,376	72.55	411	12.55	382	11.66	67	2.05	39	1.19	1,965	60.00	3,275
Payette	5,509	72.61	1,079	14.22	835	11.01	125	1.65	39	0.51	4,430	58.39	7,587
Power	1,428	72.41	420	21.30	71	3.60	35	1.77	18	0.91	1,008	51.12	1,972
Shoshone	2,858	69.55	1,005	24.46	172	4.19	43	1.05	31	0.75	1,853	45.10	4,109
Teton	2,100	44.81	2,375	50.68	143	3.05	36	0.77	32	0.68	-275	-5.87	4,686
Twin Falls	14,914	65.23	4,780	20.91	2,425	10.61	564	2.47	180	0.79	10,134	44.32	22,863
Valley	2,829	54.20	1,974	37.82	330	6.32	50	0.96	37	0.71	855	16.38	5,220
Washington	2,894	74.26	564	14.47	354	9.08	64	1.64	21	0.54	2,330	59.79	3,897
Totals	358,539	60.68	169,808	28.74	49,917	8.45	8,500	1.44	4,126	0.70	188,731	31.94	590,890

Counties that flipped from Republican to Democratic

- Teton (largest municipality: Victor)

==== By congressional district ====
Crapo won both congressional districts.

District	Crapo	Roth	Cleveland	Representative
1st	64%	24%	10%	Russ Fulcher
2nd	57%	34%	7%	Mike Simpson

== See also ==
- 2022 United States Senate elections
- 2022 Idaho elections
