= Gary W. Bauer =

American politician from Idaho

Member of the Idaho House of Representatives from the District 11, seat B district
- In office December 1, 2002 – November 30, 2004
- Preceded by: Gary Collins
- Succeeded by: Carlos Bilbao

Personal details
- Born: June 3, 1936 (age 90) Mackinaw City, Michigan
- Party: Republican
- Spouse: MaryLou Bateman (m. 1958; died 2023)
- Children: 3
- Occupation: Politician

Gary W. Bauer (born June 3, 1936) is an American politician from Idaho. Bauer was a Republican member of Idaho House of Representatives.

== Early life ==
On June 3, 1936, Bauer was born in Mackinaw City, Michigan.

== Career ==
On November 5, 2002, Bauer won the election unopposed and became a Republican member of Idaho House of Representatives for District 11, seat B.

On May 25, 2004 as an incumbent, Bauer sought for a seat in District 11, seat B unsuccessfully in the Republican Primary for Idaho House of Representatives. Bauer was defeated by Carlos Bilbao with 50.43% of the votes. Bauer lost by 43 votes. On May 23, 2006, Bauer sought for a seat in District 11, seat B unsuccessfully. Bauer was defeated by Carlos Bilbao with 55.7% of the votes. On May 27, 2008, Bauer sought for a seat in District 11, seat A unsuccessfully. Bauer was defeated by Steven Thayn with 38.3% of the votes.

== Personal life ==
Bauer's wife is Mary Lou Bauer. They have three children. Bauer and his family live in Nampa, Idaho.
