= Stephen Kren =

American electrical contractor and Idaho politician

Member of the Idaho House of Representatives from the District 13, seat B district
- In office January 16, 2007 – November 30, 2010
- Preceded by: Bill Deal
- Succeeded by: Christy Perry

Personal details
- Born: Nampa, Idaho
- Party: Republican
- Spouse: Kalah Kren
- Children: 3
- Occupation: Politician, electrical contractor

Stephen A. Kren, Jr. is an American politician from Idaho. Kren is a former Republican member of Idaho House of Representatives.

== Early life ==
Kren was born in Nampa, Idaho. Kren's father was a councilman in Nampa, Idaho.

== Career ==
Kren is an electrical contractor and a Vice President of Stephen's Electric.

On November 4, 2008, Kren won the election and became a Republican member of Idaho House of Representatives for District 13, seat B. Kren defeated Byron Yankey with 70.2% of the votes. On May 25, 2010, as an incumbent, Kren lost the primary election for District 13, seat B. Kren was defeated by Christy Perry.

== Personal life ==
Kren's wife is Kalah Kren. They have three children, Jack, Halle, and Sophie. Kren and his family live in Nampa, Idaho.
