= 2018 United States House of Representatives elections in Idaho =

- November 6, 2018

All 2 Idaho seats to the United States House of Representatives
	Majority party	Minority party
Party	Republican	Democratic
Last election	2	0
Seats won	2	0
Seat change	Steady	Steady
Popular vote	367,441	207,313
Percentage	61.73%	34.83%
Swing	▼3.93%	▲4.17%

Republican
50–60%
60–70%
70–80%
80–90%
Democratic
50–60%
60–70%

The 2018 United States House of Representatives elections in Idaho were held on Tuesday, November 6, 2018, to elect the two U.S. representatives from the U.S. state of Idaho, one from each of the state's two congressional districts. Primaries were held on May 15, 2018. The elections and primaries coincided with the elections and primaries of other federal and state offices.

== Overview ==
Results of the 2018 United States House of Representatives elections in Idaho by district:

District	Republican		Democratic		Others		Total		Result
District	Votes	%	Votes	%	Votes	%	Votes	%	Result
District 1	197,719	62.75%	96,922	30.76%	20,428	6.48%	315,069	100.0%	Republican hold
District 2	170,274	60.67%	110,381	39.33%	0	0.00%	280,655	100.0%	Republican hold
Total	367,993	61.77%	207,303	34.80%	20,428	3.43%	595,724	100.0%	

== District 1 ==
2018 Idaho's 1st congressional district election
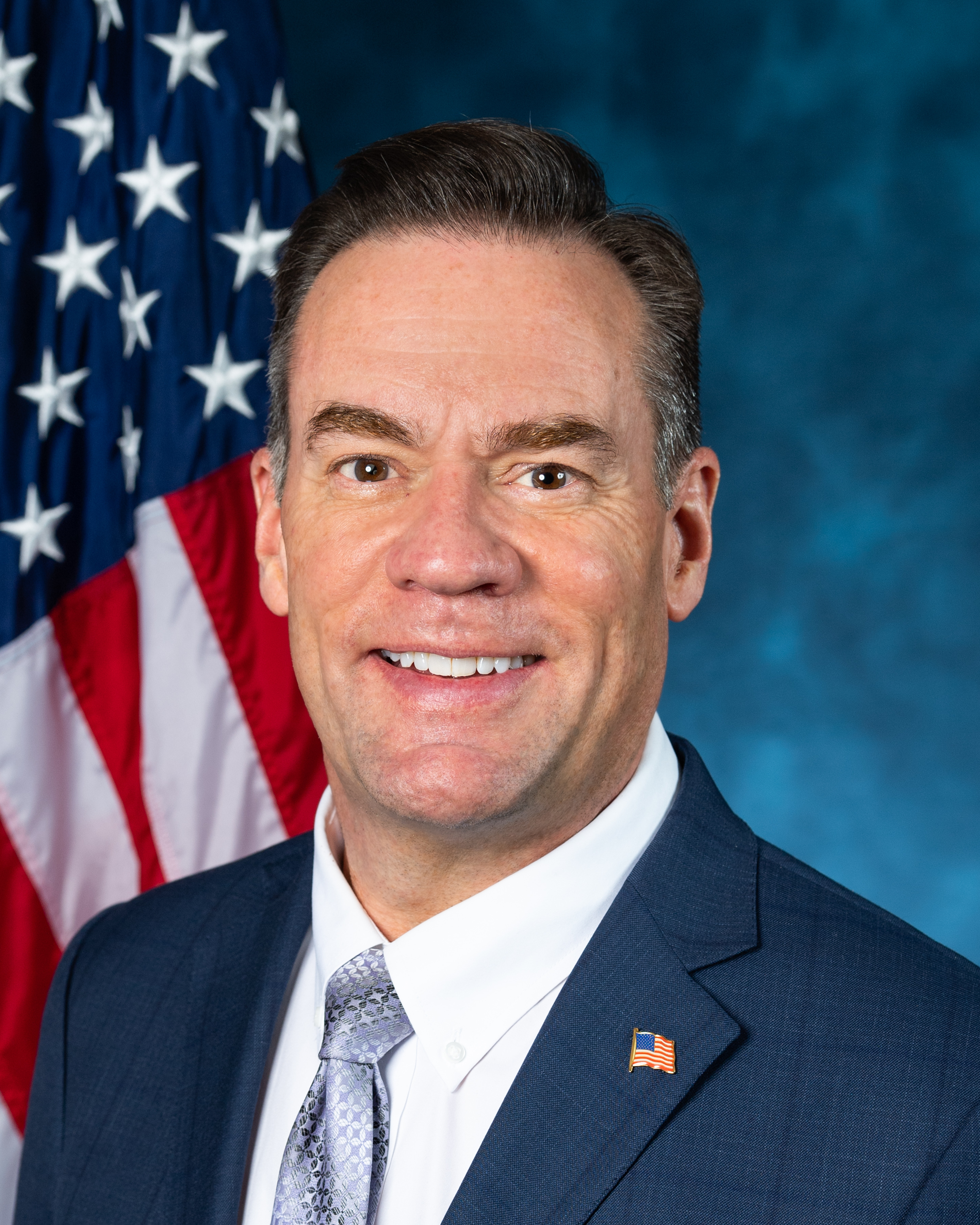

Nominee	Russ Fulcher	Cristina McNeil
Party	Republican	Democratic
Popular vote	197,167	96,932
Percentage	62.7%	30.8%
- Precinct results Fulcher: 40–50% 50–60% 60–70% 70–80% 80–90% >90% McNeil 40–50% 50–60% 60–70% 70–80% Tie: 40–50% No votes
U.S. Representatives before election
Raúl Labrador
Republican
Elected U.S. Representatives
Russ Fulcher
Republican

The incumbent was Republican Raúl Labrador, who had represented the district since 2011 and was reelected with 68% of the vote in 2016. He retired to unsuccessfully run in the 2018 Republican gubernatorial primary.

=== Republican primary ===
- Russ Fulcher, former state senator
- Alex Gallegos, retired U.S. Army lieutenant colonel
- Nick Henderson
- David H. Leroy, former lieutenant governor of Idaho
- Luke Malek, state representative
- Christy Perry, state representative
- Michael Snyder, author

==== Primary results ====
Republican primary results
Party	Candidate	Votes	%
Republican	Russ Fulcher	42,793	43.1
Republican	David H. Leroy	15,451	15.6
Republican	Luke Malek	14,154	14.3
Republican	Christy Perry	11,110	11.2
Republican	Michael Snyder	10,255	10.3
Republican	Alex Gallegos	3,478	3.5
Republican	Nick Henderson	2,003	2.0
Total votes		99,244	100.0

=== Democratic primary ===
- Cristina McNeil, real estate agent, chair of the Latino caucus of the Idaho Democratic Party
- Michael Smith, former U.S. Marine
- James Vandermaas, former U.S. Marine

==== Primary results ====
Democratic primary results
Party	Candidate	Votes	%
Democratic	Cristina McNeil	19,070	69.3
Democratic	James Vandermaas	4,491	16.3
Democratic	Michael Smith	3,963	14.4
Total votes		27,524	100.0

=== General election ===
==== Predictions ====
Source	Ranking	As of
The Cook Political Report	Safe R	November 5, 2018
Inside Elections	Safe R	November 5, 2018
Sabato's Crystal Ball	Safe R	November 5, 2018
RealClearPolitics	Safe R	November 5, 2018
Daily Kos	Safe R	November 5, 2018
538	Safe R	November 7, 2018
CNN	Safe R	October 31, 2018
Politico	Safe R	November 4, 2018

==== Debate ====
2018 Idaho's 1st congressional district debate
No.	Date	Host	Moderator	Link	Republican	Democratic
Key: P Participant A Absent N Not invited I Invited W Withdrawn						
Key: P Participant A Absent N Not invited I Invited W Withdrawn					Russ Fulcher	Cristina McNeil
1	Oct. 26, 2018	KTVB			P	P

==== Polling ====
Poll source	Date(s) administered	Sample size	Margin of error	Russ Fulcher (R)	Cristina McNeil (D)	W. Scott Howard (L)	Other	Undecided
Dan Jones & Associates	June 22 – July 9, 2018	315	± 5.5%	35%	27%	10%	8%	20%

==== Results ====
Idaho's 1st congressional district, 2018
Party	Candidate	Votes	%
Republican	Russ Fulcher	197,167	62.7
Democratic	Cristina McNeil	96,932	30.8
Independent	Natalie Fleming	6,188	2.0
Libertarian	W. Scott Howard	5,435	1.7
Independent	Paul Farmer	4,479	1.4
Constitution	Marvin "Pro-Life" Richardson	3,181	1.0
Independent	Gordon Counsil	1,054	0.3
Independent	Michael J. Rath (write-in)	91	0.0
Total votes		314,527	100.0
Republican hold			

== District 2 ==
2018 Idaho's 2nd congressional district election
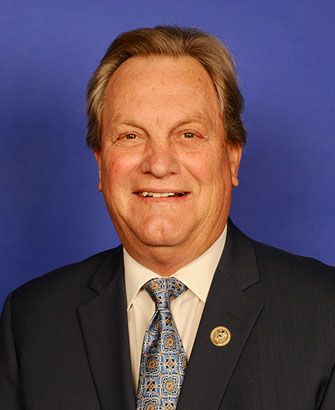

Nominee	Mike Simpson	Aaron Swisher
Party	Republican	Democratic
Popular vote	170,274	110,381
Percentage	60.7%	39.3%
- Precinct results Simpson: 50–60% 60–70% 70–80% 80–90% >90% Swisher 50–60% 60–70% 70–80% No votes
U.S. Representatives before election
Mike Simpson
Republican
Elected U.S. Representatives
Mike Simpson
Republican

The incumbent was Republican Mike Simpson, who had represented the district since 1999. He was reelected with 63% of the vote in 2016.

=== Republican primary ===
- Mike Simpson, incumbent

==== Primary results ====
Republican primary results
Party	Candidate	Votes	%
Republican	Mike Simpson (incumbent)	72,227	100.0
Total votes		72,227	100.0

=== Democratic primary ===
- Peter Rickards
- Aaron Swisher, businessman

==== Primary results ====
Democratic primary results
Party	Candidate	Votes	%
Democratic	Aaron Swisher	18,675	67.6
Democratic	Peter Rickards	8,943	32.4
Total votes		27,618	100.0

=== General election ===
==== Predictions ====
Source	Ranking	As of
The Cook Political Report	Safe R	November 5, 2018
Inside Elections	Safe R	November 5, 2018
Sabato's Crystal Ball	Safe R	November 5, 2018
RCP	Safe R	November 5, 2018
Daily Kos	Safe R	November 5, 2018
538	Safe R	November 7, 2018
CNN	Safe R	October 31, 2018
Politico	Safe R	November 4, 2018

==== Polling ====
Poll source	Date(s) administered	Sample size	Margin of error	Mike Simpson (R)	Aaron Swisher (D)	Other	Undecided
Dan Jones & Associates	June 22 – July 9, 2018	285	± 5.8%	59%	23%	10%	9%

==== Results ====
Idaho's 2nd congressional district, 2018
Party	Candidate	Votes	%
Republican	Mike Simpson (incumbent)	170,274	60.7
Democratic	Aaron Swisher	110,381	39.3
Total votes		280,655	100.0
Republican hold			
