= Carlos Bilbao =

American politician from Idaho (1936–2019)

Member of the Idaho House of Representatives from the District 11, seat B district
- In office December 1, 2004 – November 30, 2012
- Preceded by: Gary W. Bauer
- Succeeded by: Christy Perry

Personal details
- Born: November 14, 1936 Emmett, Idaho, U.S.
- Died: November 11, 2019 (aged 82)
- Party: Republican
- Education: Orange Coast College, University of Washington

Military service
- Allegiance: United States
- Branch/service: United States Navy
- Years of service: 1954–1962

Carlos Vincente Bilbao (November 14, 1936 – November 11, 2019) was an American Republican politician who served as an Idaho State Representative from 2004, representing District 11 in the B seat. Redistricted to District 8, Bilbao had announced in December 2011 that he would seek its senate seat, but in February 2012 announced that he would retire. Bilbao died on November 11, 2019, at the age of 82.

== Early life and education ==
Carlos Vincente Bilbao was born in Emmett, Idaho on November 14, 1936. He graduated from Emmett High School, earned his associate degree in business from Orange Coast College, and earned his bachelor's degree in business management from the University of Washington.

== Elections ==
- 2004 Bilbao challenged Republican Representative Gary W. Bauer in the May 25, 2004, Republican primary, winning by 43 votes with 2,496 votes (50.43%), and won the November 2, 2004, general election with 10,645 votes (70.2%) against Tom Gatfield (D).
- 2006 Challenged by Bauer in a rematch in the May 23, 2006, Republican primary, Bilbao won with 2,907 votes (55.7%) against Bauer, and was unopposed for the November 7, 2006, general election, winning with 11,446 votes.
- 2008 Bilbao won the four-way May 27, 2008, Republican primary with 3,330 votes (64.1%), and won the November 4, 2008, general election with 14,056 votes (77.1%) against Constitution Party nominee Paul Venable.
- 2010 Bilbao won the May 25, 2010, Republican primary with 3,181 votes (58.5%) against Thomas Munds, and won the November 2, 2010, general election with 11,260 votes (84.2%) against Libertarian nominee John Charles Smith.
