= Marge Chadderdon =

American politician from Idaho

Member of the Idaho House of Representatives from the District 4 Seat A district
- In office December 1, 2004 – December 1, 2012
- Preceded by: Bonnie Douglas
- Succeeded by: Luke Malek

Personal details
- Born: December 1, 1937 (age 88) Poplar, Montana
- Party: Republican
- Education: Gonzaga University; College of Great Falls

Marjorie 'Marge' A. Chadderdon (born December 1, 1937) was a Republican Idaho State Representative from 2004 to 2012 representing District 4 in the A seat.

== Early life ==
On December 1, 1937, Chadderdon was born in Poplar, Montana.

== Education ==
In 1957, Chadderdon earned an Associate degree in education College of Great Falls. Chadderdon attended Gonzaga University.

== Career ==
In 1957, Chadderdon was a bookkeeper of Occident Grain Elevators, until 1958.

In 1966, Chadderdon became a co-owner of Carpet Center Stores, until 1996. In 1967, Chadderdon was an office manager of Prestiges Carpets, until 1972.

In 1975. Chadderdon became a co-owner, treasurer, and secretary of C & S Textile, Incorporated until 1996.

In 1978, Chadderdon became an office manager of Carpet Center Stores, until 1993.

In 1979, Chadderdon started her political career as a council member of Fernan Village, until 1983.

== Elections ==
=== 2010 ===
Chadderdon was unopposed in the Republican primary. Chadderon defeated Democratic nominee Mike Bullard with 61.9% of the vote.

=== 2008 ===
Chadderdon was unopposed in the Republican primary. Chadderdon defeated Democratic nominee Tamara Lee Poelstra with 58% of the vote in the general election.

=== 2006 ===
Chadderdon was unopposed in the Republican primary election. Chadderdon defeated Democratic nominee Bonnie Douglas with 53.51% of the vote in the general election.

=== 2004 ===
Chadderdon defeated Jim Hollingsworth with 55.87% of the votes in the Republican primary Chadderdon defeated Democratic nominee Mike Gridley with 53.7% of the vote in the general election.
