= Christy Perry =

American politician from Idaho

Member of the Idaho House of Representatives
- In office December 1, 2010 – November 30, 2018
- Preceded by: Stephen Kren
- Succeeded by: Tammy Nichols
- Constituency: 13th district Seat B (2010–2012); 11th district Seat B (2012–2018)

Personal details
- Born: June 4, 1968 (age 58) Ankara, Turkey
- Party: Republican
- Spouse: Matthew
- Education: Boise State University

Christy Perry (born June 4, 1968, in Ankara, Turkey) is a Republican Idaho State Representative since 2010 representing District 11 in the B seat.

== Early life ==
Born in Turkey in a military family, Perry graduated Middleton High School and earned her bachelor's degree in political science and a master's degree in public administration from Boise State University. At Boise State, she graduated summa cum laude, was a Top Ten Scholar finalist, and graduated from the Honors College with "Distinguished Honors".

== Elections ==
=== Idaho's First Congressional District ===
Perry filed to run for Idaho's 1st congressional district in 2018 on November 14, 2017. After she filed Perry stated "This no, no, no attitude has gotten our country nowhere. Really what we want to do is take some of the lessons we have learned in the Idaho Legislature and show how Idaho does things, use a common-sense approach to government. We want to see that in the federal government”.

Perry took fourth losing to Luke Malek, David H. Leroy, and Russ Fulcher, taking only 11.2% of the vote.

=== Idaho House 11 Seat B ===
2016

Perry defeated challenger Kathryn Ralstin in the Republican primary election with 3,375 votes (78.6%).

Perry defeated 3 general election challengers winning with 13,896 votes (72%).

2014

Perry was unchallenged in both the primary and the general election.

2012

Redistricted to 11B, Perry won the four-way May 15, 2012, Republican primary with 2,855 votes (50.1%).

Perry was unopposed in the November 6, 2012, general election to succeed fellow Republican Representative Carlos Bilbao, who had been redistricted to District 8 and retired after canceling an announced run for its Senate seat.

=== Idaho House 13 Seat B ===
Perry challenged incumbent Republican Steve A. Kren in the primary election, winning with 3,398 (56.6%).

Perry was unopposed in the November 2, 2010, general election and won with 14,016 votes.

== Personal life ==
On October 24, 2016, Perry's husband Matthew filed for divorce after it was revealed his wife had engaged in an extramarital affair with Idaho State Senator Jim Guthrie. Rep. Perry issued a statement saying, "I was experiencing a profound crisis in my life. During that time, I turned to a friend in the legislature and ultimately made a terrible mistake for which I am truly sorry." The divorce was later dismissed in court since the couple decided to reconcile. Perry was cleared of any wrong-doing in the Idaho Legislature.

Perry and her husband, Matt, have four children and three grandchildren, and co-own Buckhorn Gun & Pawn in Boise.
