= Idaho's 1st congressional district =

U.S. House district for Idaho

Coordinates: 45°N 116°W

- Interactive map of district boundaries since January 3, 2023
- Representative: Russ Fulcher; R–Meridian
- Distribution: 65.82% urban; 34.18% rural
- Population (2025): 1,055,313
- Median household income: $85,318
- Ethnicity: 80.0% White; 11.8% Hispanic; 4.7% Two or more races; 1.7% other; 1.1% Asian; 1.0% Native American; 0.6% Black
- Cook PVI: R+22

Idaho's 1st congressional district is one of two congressional districts in the U.S. state of Idaho. It comprises the western portion of the state. The 1st district is currently represented by Russ Fulcher, a Republican from Meridian, who was first elected in 2018, and re-elected in 2020 and 2022.

== History ==
From statehood in 1890 to the 1910 election, Idaho was represented by a statewide at-large seat. Following the 1910 census, Idaho gained a second House seat; it was first contested in 1912. However, through the 1916 election, both seats were statewide at-large seats. The first election in Idaho with two congressional districts was in 1918.

The 2012 election cycle saw the district remain largely in the shape it has had since the 1950s, encompassing the western third of the state. Historically, it has been reckoned as the Boise district, as it usually included most of the state capital. The 2020 redistricting cycle, however, saw the 1st pushed to the west, shifting almost all of its share of Boise to the 2nd district. This was due to a significant increase in population directly west of Boise over the previous decade, in Canyon County and western Ada County. However, the 1st continues to include most of Boise's suburbs. In Ada County itself, the district continues to include Meridian, Eagle, Kuna, and some parts of Boise, south of Interstate 84. It also includes the entire northern portion of the state, through the Panhandle.

== Recent election results from statewide races ==
Year	Office	Results
2008	President	McCain 62% - 35%
2012	President	Romney 67% - 33%
2016	President	Trump 64% - 25%
2016	Senate	Crapo 69% - 25%
2018	Governor	Little 64% - 34%
2018	Lt. Governor	McGeachin 64% - 36%
2018	Attorney General	Wasden 69% - 31%
2020	President	Trump 68% - 30%
2020	Senate	Risch 66% - 30%
2022	Senate	Crapo 64% - 24%
2022	Governor	Little 61% - 17%
2022	Lt. Governor	Bedke 68% - 26%
2022	Secretary of State	McGrane 76% - 23%
2022	Controller	Woolf 74% - 23%
2022	Treasurer	Ellsworth 76% - 24%
2022	Attorney General	Labrador 69% - 31%
2024	President	Trump 71% - 26%

== Composition ==
The 1st district includes the entirety of the following counties, with the exception of Ada, which it shares with the 2nd district. Ada County municipalities included within the 1st district include Eagle, Star, Meridian, Kuna, and portions of Boise.

#	County	Seat	Population
1	Ada	Boise	524,673
3	Adams	Council	4,903
9	Benewah	St. Maries	10,369
15	Boise	Idaho City	8,517
17	Bonner	Sandpoint	52,547
21	Boundary	Bonners Ferry	13,557
27	Canyon	Caldwell	257,674
35	Clearwater	Orofino	9,214
45	Gem	Emmett	21,071
49	Idaho	Grangeville	17,890
55	Kootenai	Coeur d'Alene	185,010
57	Latah	Moscow	41,301
61	Lewis	Nezperce	3,739
69	Nez Perce	Lewiston	42,987
73	Owyhee	Murphy	12,722
75	Payette	Payette	27,279
79	Shoshone	Wallace	14,026
85	Valley	Cascade	12,644
87	Washington	Weiser	11,425

== List of members representing the district ==
Representative	Party	Term	Cong ress	Electoral history
District created March 4, 1919
Burton French (Moscow)	Republican	March 4, 1919 – March 3, 1933	66th 67th 68th 69th 70th 71st 72nd	Redistricted from the at-large district and re-elected in 1918. Re-elected in 1920. Re-elected in 1922. Re-elected in 1924. Re-elected in 1926. Re-elected in 1928. Re-elected in 1930. Lost re-election.
Compton White (Clark Fork)	Democratic	March 4, 1933 – January 3, 1947	73rd 74th 75th 76th 77th 78th 79th	Elected in 1932. Re-elected in 1934. Re-elected in 1936. Re-elected in 1938. Re-elected in 1940. Re-elected in 1942. Re-elected in 1944. Lost re-election.
Abe Goff (Moscow)	Republican	January 3, 1947 – January 3, 1949	80th	Elected in 1946. Lost re-election.
Compton White (Clark Fork)	Democratic	January 3, 1949 – January 3, 1951	81st	Elected in 1948. Retired to run for U.S. Senator.
John T. Wood (Coeur d'Alene)	Republican	January 3, 1951 – January 3, 1953	82nd	Elected in 1950. Lost re-election.
Gracie Pfost (Nampa)	Democratic	January 3, 1953 – January 3, 1963	83rd 84th 85th 86th 87th	Elected in 1952. Re-elected in 1954. Re-elected in 1956. Re-elected in 1958. Re-elected in 1960. Retired to run for U.S. Senator.
Compton I. White Jr. (Clark Fork)	Democratic	January 3, 1963 – January 3, 1967	88th 89th	Elected in 1962. Re-elected in 1964. Lost re-election.
Jim McClure (Payette)	Republican	January 3, 1967 – January 3, 1973	90th 91st 92nd	Elected in 1966. Re-elected in 1968. Re-elected in 1970. Retired to run for U.S. Senator.
Steve Symms (Caldwell)	Republican	January 3, 1973 – January 3, 1981	93rd 94th 95th 96th	Elected in 1972. Re-elected in 1974. Re-elected in 1976. Re-elected in 1978. Retired to run for U.S. Senator.
Larry Craig (Boise)	Republican	January 3, 1981 – January 3, 1991	97th 98th 99th 100th 101st	Elected in 1980. Re-elected in 1982. Re-elected in 1984. Re-elected in 1986. Re-elected in 1988. Retired to run for U.S. Senator.
Larry LaRocco (McCall)	Democratic	January 3, 1991 – January 3, 1995	102nd 103rd	Elected in 1990. Re-elected in 1992. Lost re-election.
Helen Chenoweth-Hage (Boise)	Republican	January 3, 1995 – January 3, 2001	104th 105th 106th	Elected in 1994. Re-elected in 1996. Re-elected in 1998. Retired.
Butch Otter (Star)	Republican	January 3, 2001 – January 3, 2007	107th 108th 109th	Elected in 2000. Re-elected in 2002. Re-elected in 2004. Retired to run for Governor.
Bill Sali (Kuna)	Republican	January 3, 2007 – January 3, 2009	110th	Elected in 2006. Lost re-election.
Walt Minnick (Boise)	Democratic	January 3, 2009 – January 3, 2011	111th	Elected in 2008. Lost re-election.
Raúl Labrador (Eagle)	Republican	January 3, 2011 – January 3, 2019	112th 113th 114th 115th	Elected in 2010. Re-elected in 2012. Re-elected in 2014. Re-elected in 2016. Retired to run for Governor.
Russ Fulcher (Meridian)	Republican	January 3, 2019 – present	116th 117th 118th 119th	Elected in 2018. Re-elected in 2020. Re-elected in 2022. Re-elected in 2024. Re-elected in 2026.

== Election results ==
=== 2002 ===
Idaho's 1st congressional district election (2002)
Party	Candidate	Votes	%
Republican	Butch Otter (incumbent)	120,743	58.57
Democratic	Betty Richardson	80,269	38.94
Libertarian	Steve Gothard	5,129	2.49
Total votes		206,141	100.00
Turnout			
Republican hold			

=== 2004 ===
Idaho's 1st congressional district election (2004)
Party	Candidate	Votes	%
Republican	Butch Otter (incumbent)	207,662	69.55
Democratic	Naomi Preston	90,927	30.45
Total votes		298,589	100.00
Turnout			
Republican hold			

=== 2006 ===
Idaho's 1st congressional district election (2006)
Party	Candidate	Votes	%
Republican	Bill Sali	115,843	49.94
Democratic	Larry Grant	103,935	44.81
Independent	Dave Olson	6,857	2.96
Natural Law	Andy Hedden-Nicely	2,882	1.24
Constitution	Paul Smith	2,457	1.06
Total votes		231,974	100.00
Turnout			
Republican hold			

=== 2008 ===
Idaho's 1st congressional district election (2008)
Party	Candidate	Votes	%
Democratic	Walt Minnick	175,898	50.61
Republican	Bill Sali (incumbent)	171,687	49.39
Total votes		347,585	100.00
Turnout			
Democratic gain from Republican			

=== 2010 ===
Idaho's 1st congressional district election (2010)
Party	Candidate	Votes	%
Republican	Raúl Labrador	126,231	51.02
Democratic	Walt Minnick (incumbent)	102,135	41.28
Independent	Dave Olson	14,365	5.81
Libertarian	Mike Washburn	4,696	1.90
Total votes		247,427	100.00
Turnout			
Republican gain from Democratic			

=== 2012 ===
Republican primary results
Party	Candidate	Votes	%
Republican	Raúl Labrador	58,003	80.6
Republican	Reed McCandless	13,917	19.4
Total votes		71,920	100

Democratic primary results
Party	Candidate	Votes	%
Democratic	Jimmy Farris	5,362	53.2
Democratic	Cynthia Clinkingbeard	4,723	46.8
Total votes		10,085	100

Idaho 1st Congressional District 2012
Party	Candidate	Votes	%
Republican	Raúl Labrador (incumbent)	199,402	63.0
Democratic	Jimmy Farris	97,450	30.8
Libertarian	Rob Oates	12,265	3.9
Independent	Pro-Life	7,607	2.4
Total votes		316,724	100.0

=== 2014 ===
Republican primary results
Party	Candidate	Votes	%
Republican	Raúl Labrador	56,206	78.6
Republican	Lisa Marie	5,164	7.2
Republican	Michael Greenway	3,494	4.9
Republican	Reed McCandless	3,373	4.7
Republican	Sean Blackwell	3,304	4.6
Total votes		71,541	100

Democratic primary results
Party	Candidate	Votes	%
Democratic	Shirley Ringo	9,047	82.0
Democratic	Ryan Barone	1,981	18.0
Total votes		11,028	100

Idaho's 1st congressional district election, 2014
Party	Candidate	Votes	%
Republican	Raúl Labrador (incumbent)	143,580	65.01
Democratic	Shirley Ringo	77,277	34.99
Other	Write-ins	7	<0.01
Majority		66,303	30.02%
Total votes		220,864	100
Republican hold			

=== 2016 ===
Republican primary results
Party	Candidate	Votes	%
Republican	Raúl Labrador	51,568	80.98
Republican	Gordon Counsil	6,510	10.22
Republican	Isaac M. Haugen	5,605	8.80
Total votes		63,683	100

Democratic primary results
Party	Candidate	Votes	%
Democratic	James Piotrowski	6,954	56.15
Democratic	Shizandra Fox	3,428	27.68
Democratic	Staniela Nikolova	2,002	16.17
Total votes		12,384	100

Idaho's 1st congressional district election, 2016
Party	Candidate	Votes	%
Republican	Raúl Labrador (incumbent)	242,252	68.17
Democratic	James Piotrowski	113,052	31.82
Other	Write-ins	53	0.01
Total votes		355,357	100
Republican hold			

=== 2018 ===
Republican primary results
Party	Candidate	Votes	%
Republican	Russ Fulcher	42,793	43.1
Republican	David H. Leroy	15,451	15.6
Republican	Luke Malek	14,154	14.3
Republican	Christy Perry	11,110	11.2
Republican	Michael Snyder	10,255	10.3
Republican	Alex Gallegos	3,478	3.5
Republican	Nick Henderson	2,003	2.0
Total votes		99,244	100.0

Democratic primary results
Party	Candidate	Votes	%
Democratic	Cristina McNeil	19,070	69.3
Democratic	James Vandermaas	4,491	16.3
Democratic	Michael Smith	3,963	14.4
Total votes		27,524	100.0

Idaho's 1st congressional district election, 2018
Party	Candidate	Votes	%
Republican	Russ Fulcher	197,167	62.7
Democratic	Cristina McNeil	96,932	30.8
Independent	Natalie Fleming	6,188	2.0
Libertarian	W. Scott Howard	5,435	1.7
Independent	Paul Farmer	4,479	1.4
Constitution	Pro-Life	3,181	1.0
Independent	Gordon Counsil	1,054	0.3
Independent	Michael J. Rath (write-in)	91	0.0
Total votes		314,527	100.0
Republican hold			

=== 2020 ===
2020 United States House of Representatives elections in Idaho
Party	Candidate	Votes	%
Republican	Russ Fulcher (incumbent)	310,736	67.8
Democratic	Rudy Soto	131,380	28.6
Libertarian	Joe Evans	16,453	3.6
Total votes		458,569	100.0
Republican hold			

=== 2022 ===
2022 United States House of Representatives elections in Idaho
Party	Candidate	Votes	%
Republican	Russ Fulcher (incumbent)	222,901	71.3
Democratic	Kaylee Peterson	82,261	26.3
Libertarian	Darian Drake	7,280	2.3
Total votes		312,442	100.0
Republican hold			

=== 2024 ===
2024 United States House of Representatives elections in Idaho
Party	Candidate	Votes	%
Republican	Russ Fulcher (incumbent)	331,049	71.00
Democratic	Kaylee Peterson	118,656	25.40
Libertarian	Matt Loesby	9,594	2.10
Constitution	Brendan Gomez	6,933	1.50
Total votes		466,232	100.0
Republican hold			

== Historical district boundaries ==
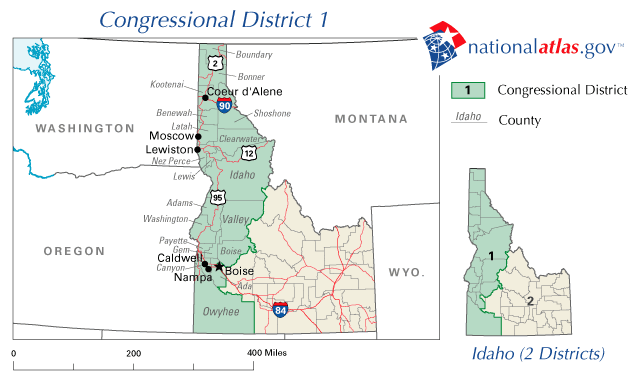
2003 – 2013

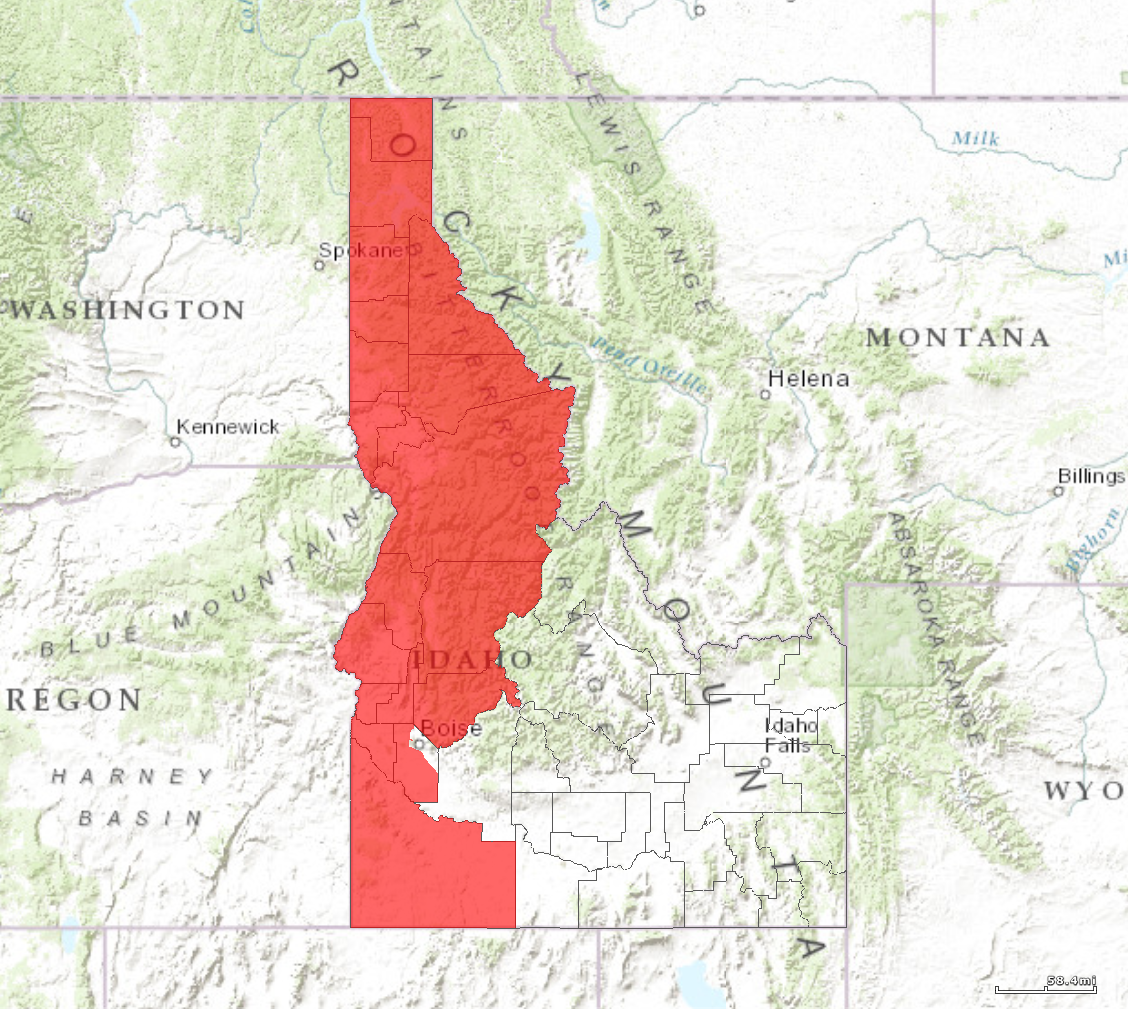
2013 – 2023

== See also ==
- Idaho's congressional districts
- List of United States congressional districts
