= 2020 United States House of Representatives elections in Idaho =

- November 3, 2020

All 2 Idaho seats to the United States House of Representatives
	Majority party	Minority party
Party	Republican	Democratic
Last election	2	0
Seats won	2	0
Seat change	Steady	Steady
Popular vote	561,414	255,531
Percentage	66.06%	30.07%
Swing	▲4.33%	▼4.76%

Republican
40–50%
50–60%
60–70%
70–80%
80–90%
Democratic
40–50%
50–60%

The 2020 United States House of Representatives elections in Idaho were held on November 3, 2020, to elect the two U.S. representatives from the state of Idaho, one from both of the state's congressional districts. The elections coincided with the 2020 U.S. presidential election, as well as other elections to the House of Representatives, elections to the United States Senate and various state and local elections.

== District 1 ==
2020 Idaho's 1st congressional district election
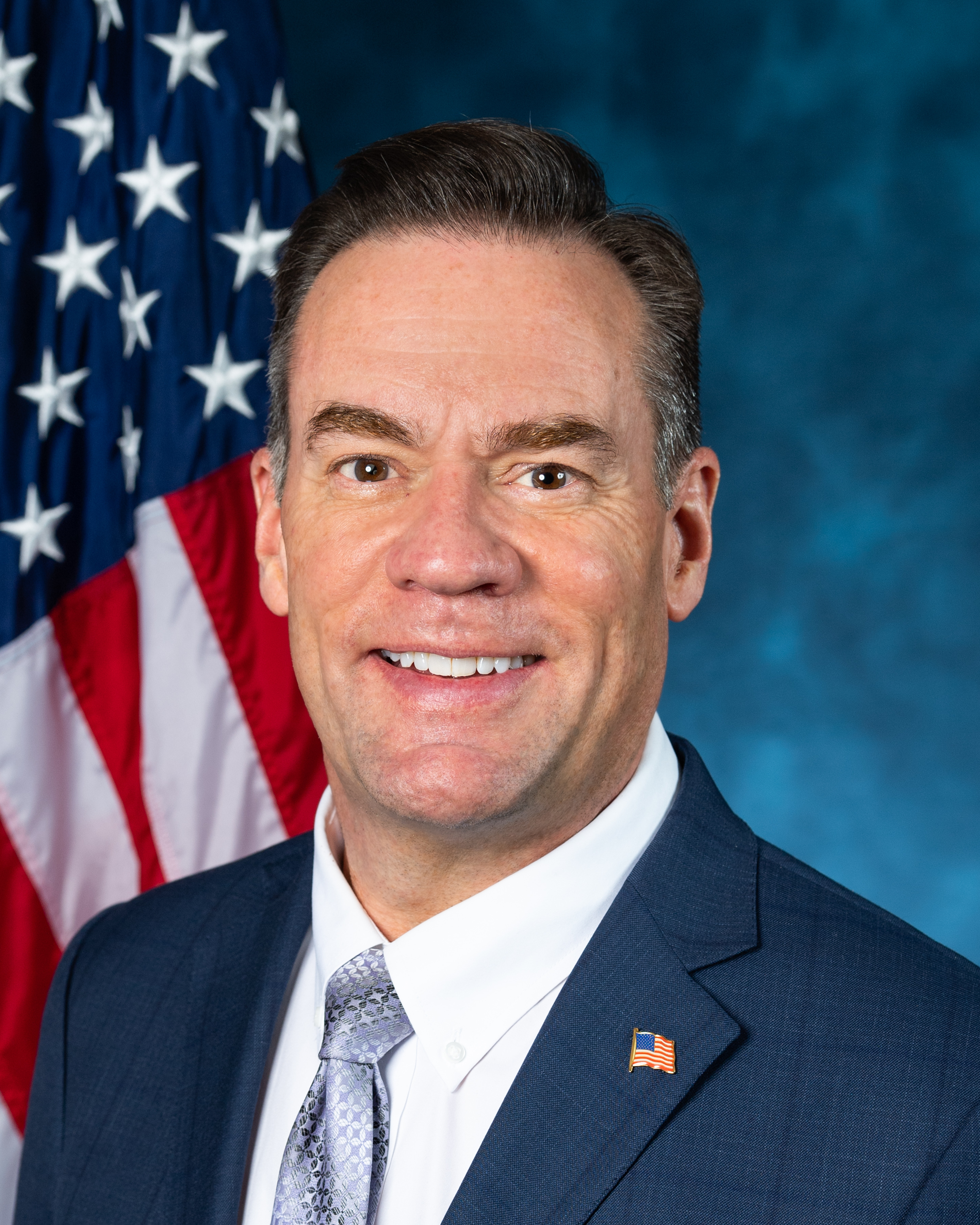

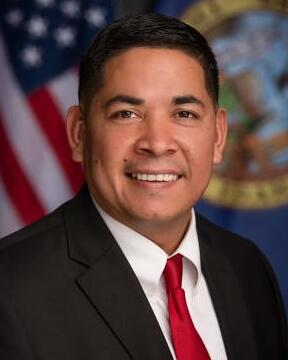
Nominee	Russ Fulcher	Rudy Soto
Party	Republican	Democratic
Popular vote	310,736	131,380
Percentage	67.8%	28.6%
- Fulcher: 40–50% 50–60% 60–70% 70–80% 80–90% >90% Soto 40–50% 50–60% 60–70% 70–80% No votes
U.S. Representatives before election
Russ Fulcher
Republican
Elected U.S. Representatives
Russ Fulcher
Republican

The 1st district takes in the Idaho Panhandle and the western Boise area. The incumbent was Republican Russ Fulcher, who was elected with 62.8% of the vote in 2018.

=== Republican primary ===
==== Candidates ====
===== Declared =====
- Russ Fulcher, incumbent U.S. representative
- Nicholas Jones, lecturer and businessman

==== Primary results ====
Republican primary results
Party	Candidate	Votes	%
Republican	Russ Fulcher (incumbent)	93,879	79.9
Republican	Nicholas Jones	23,654	20.1
Total votes		117,533	100.0

=== Democratic primary ===
==== Candidates ====
===== Declared =====
- Staniela Nikolova, law student at the University of Idaho, former Idaho Senate page, and candidate for Idaho's 1st congressional district in 2016
- Rudy Soto, member of the Northern Shoshone tribe and U.S. Army National Guard veteran

==== Endorsements ====
Rudy Soto

State officials

- Mat Erpelding, former Idaho House Minority Leader

Organizations

- League of Conservation Voters

==== Primary results ====
Democratic primary results
Party	Candidate	Votes	%
Democratic	Rudy Soto	25,112	65.8
Democratic	Staniela Nikolova	13,074	34.2
Total votes		38,186	100.0

=== Libertarian primary ===
==== Candidates ====
===== Declared =====
- Joe Evans, data engineer and former military intelligence analyst

=== General election ===
==== Predictions ====
Source	Ranking	As of
The Cook Political Report	Safe R	November 2, 2020
Inside Elections	Safe R	October 28, 2020
Sabato's Crystal Ball	Safe R	November 2, 2020
Politico	Safe R	November 2, 2020
Daily Kos	Safe R	November 2, 2020
RCP	Safe R	November 2, 2020

==== Results ====
Idaho's 1st congressional district, 2020
Party	Candidate	Votes	%
Republican	Russ Fulcher (incumbent)	310,736	67.8
Democratic	Rudy Soto	131,380	28.6
Libertarian	Joe Evans	16,453	3.6
Total votes		458,569	100.0
Republican hold			

== District 2 ==
2020 Idaho's 2nd congressional district election
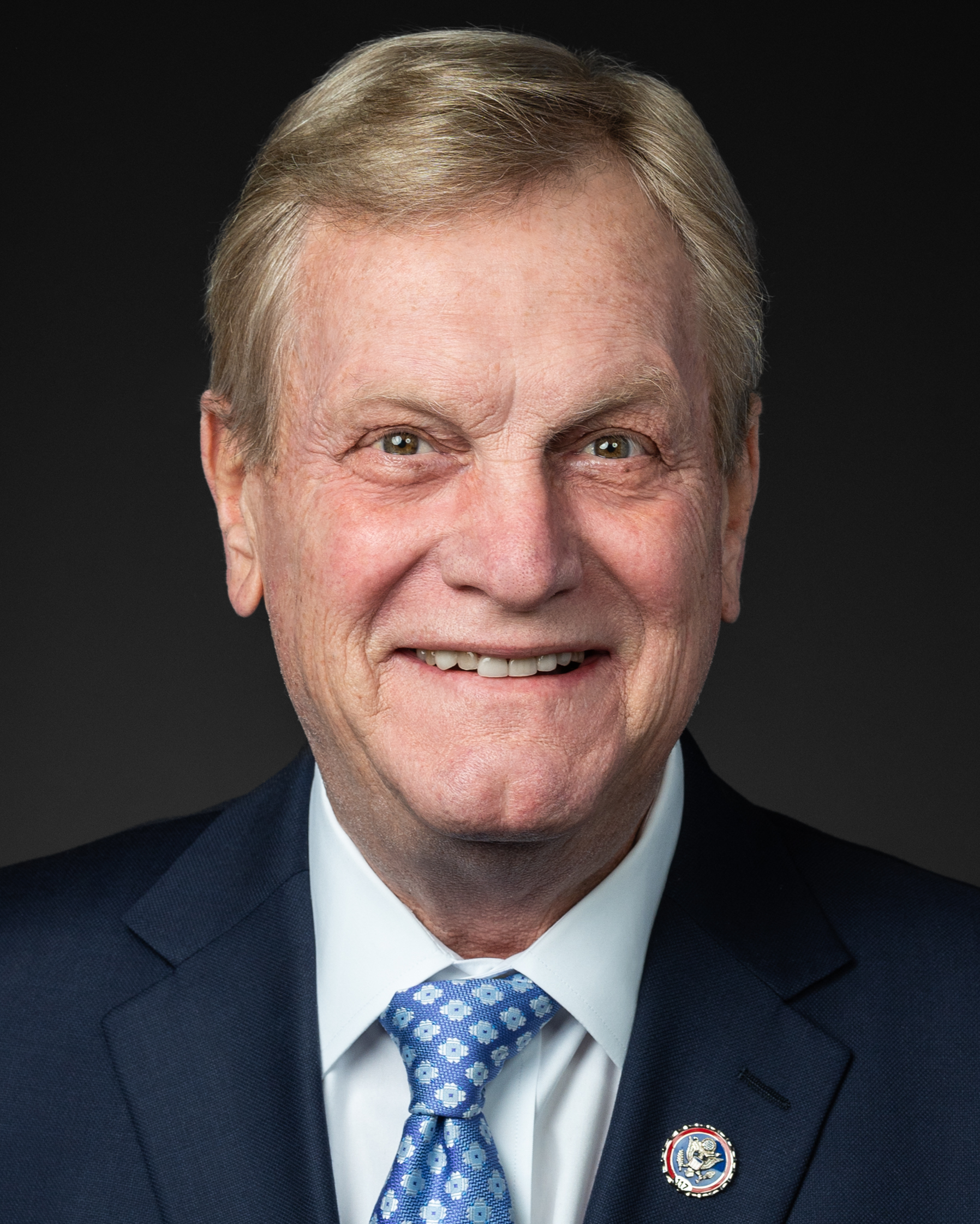

Nominee	Mike Simpson	Aaron Swisher
Party	Republican	Democratic
Popular vote	250,669	124,151
Percentage	64.1%	31.7%
- Simpson: 40–50% 50–60% 60–70% 70–80% 80–90% >90% Swisher: 40–50% 50–60% 60–70% 70–80% 80–90% No votes
U.S. Representatives before election
Mike Simpson
Republican
Elected U.S. Representatives
Mike Simpson
Republican

The 2nd district encompasses eastern and northern Boise, as well as Eastern Idaho. The incumbent was Republican Mike Simpson, who was re-elected with 60.7% of the vote in 2018.

=== Republican primary ===
==== Candidates ====
===== Declared =====
- Kevin Rhoades, former mixed martial arts fighter and candidate for the Idaho House of Representatives in 2018
- Mike Simpson, incumbent U.S. representative

==== Primary results ====
Republican primary results
Party	Candidate	Votes	%
Republican	Mike Simpson (incumbent)	68,675	72.0
Republican	Kevin Rhoades	26,724	28.0
Total votes		95,399	100.0

=== Democratic primary ===
==== Candidates ====
===== Declared =====
- Aaron Swisher, economist and nominee in 2018

==== Primary results ====
Democratic primary results
Party	Candidate	Votes	%
Democratic	Aaron Swisher	37,495	100.0
Total votes		37,495	100.0

=== Constitution primary ===
==== Candidates ====
===== Declared =====
- Pro-Life, anti-abortion activist, farmer, and perennial candidate

=== Libertarian primary ===
==== Candidates ====
===== Declared =====
- Idaho Sierra Law, environmental activist and perennial candidate

=== General election ===
==== Predictions ====
Source	Ranking	As of
The Cook Political Report	Safe R	November 2, 2020
Inside Elections	Safe R	October 28, 2020
Sabato's Crystal Ball	Safe R	November 2, 2020
Politico	Safe R	November 2, 2020
Daily Kos	Safe R	November 2, 2020
RCP	Safe R	November 2, 2020

==== Results ====
Idaho's 2nd congressional district, 2020
Party	Candidate	Votes	%
Republican	Mike Simpson (incumbent)	250,669	64.1
Democratic	Aaron Swisher	124,151	31.7
Constitution	Pro-Life	8,573	2.2
Libertarian	Idaho Sierra Law	7,940	2.0
Total votes		391,333	100.0
Republican hold			

== See also ==
- 2020 Idaho elections
