= Luke Malek =

American politician from Idaho (born 1981)

Member of the Idaho House of Representatives from the 4A district
- In office December 1, 2012 – December 1, 2018
- Preceded by: Marge Chadderdon
- Succeeded by: Jim Addis

Personal details
- Born: October 20, 1981 (age 44)
- Party: Republican
- Education: College of Idaho (BA); University of Idaho (JD)
- Website: lukemalek.com

Luke Malek is an American attorney and politician who served as a member of the Idaho House of Representatives for the 4A district from 2012 to 2018.

== Early life and education ==
Malek was raised in the Idaho Panhandle region. He earned a Bachelor of Arts degree from the College of Idaho and a Juris Doctor from the University of Idaho College of Law.

== Career ==
In 2005, Malek worked as an intern in the office of Senator Larry Craig, specializing in health policy. In 2005 and 2006, he was the communications director for the Dirne Community Health Center. In 2006 and 2007, he served as the North Idaho regional director for then-Governor Jim Risch. In 2006 and 2007, he served as the executive director of the Post Falls Urban Renewal Agency. From 2009 to 2011, he was an extern in the Office of the Kootenai County Prosecuting Attorney. He then served as a deputy prosecuting attorney until 2012. He also worked as the director of legal affairs and program development at Heritage Health. Since 2015, he has operated an independent legal practice.

Malek was elected to the Idaho House of Representatives in 2012 and served until 2018. During his tenure, he served as vice chair of the House Judiciary, Rules and Administration Committee.

== Elections ==
=== Idaho House of Representatives ===
==== 2012 ====
Malek defeated Jeff Ames with 65.5% of the vote in the Republican primary. Malek defeated Democratic nominee Janet Callen and Constitution Party nominee Ray J. Writz with 57.5% of the vote.

==== 2014 ====
Malek defeated Toby Schindelbeck with 52.7% of the vote (180 votes) in the Republican primary. Malek was unopposed in the general election.

==== 2016 ====
Malek defeated Art Macomber with 58.4% of the vote in the Republican primary. Malek defeated Democratic nominee Patrick P Mitchell with 68.8% of the vote.

=== 2018 congressional campaign ===
On August 15, 2017, Malek declared his candidacy for Idaho's 1st congressional district in the 2018 election. In the Republican primary, Malek placed third after David H. Leroy and eventual winner Russ Fulcher; getting only 14.3% of the vote.

=== 2022 lieutenant gubernatorial campaign ===
On November 13, 2020, Malek declared his candidacy for lieutenant governor of Idaho in the 2022 election.

Just over a year later, on November 21, 2021, Malek dropped out of the race and endorsed fellow Republican, Scott Bedke.
