= Idaho's congressional districts =

Map of Idaho's congressional districts since 2023 Interactive map version

Idaho has two congressional districts. A state since 1890, it gained its second seat in the United States House of Representatives for the 1912 election. Both seats were at-large selections on the ballot (entire state) for three elections, until the two districts were established prior to the 1918 election. Since then, Idaho has had two districts represented in the House.

== Current districts and representatives ==
This is a list of United States representatives from Idaho, district boundary maps, and the district political ratings according to the CPVI. The delegation has a total of 2 members, both with the Republican party.

Current U.S. representatives from Idaho
District	Member (Residence)	Party	Incumbent since	CPVI (2025)	District map
1st	Russ Fulcher (Meridian)	Republican	January 3, 2019	R+22	Map of Idaho's 1st congressional district
2nd	Mike Simpson (Idaho Falls)	Republican	January 3, 1999	R+13	Map of Idaho's 2nd congressional district

== District profiles ==
=== First district ===
The 1st district seat encompasses the northern and most of the southwestern portion of the state. Starting at the Canada–U.S. border, it includes all areas in the Pacific Time Zone and follows the western border to the southwestern corner. It formerly included most of the state capital, Boise, but with redistricting in 2012, northeast Ada County, including most of the Boise city limits, is now within the 2nd district. Meridian, Eagle, and west Boise south of Interstate 84 remain in the first district as are all areas north of Boise, including McCall, Lewiston, Moscow, and Coeur d'Alene.

It is represented by Russ Fulcher, a Republican first elected in 2018.

=== Second district ===
The 2nd district seat encompasses the eastern part of the state. It includes all of Pocatello, Idaho Falls, Twin Falls, and Rexburg. It extends to southwest Idaho to Elmore County, and includes most of the Boise city limits in northeast Ada County.

It is represented by Mike Simpson, a Republican first elected in 1998.

== Historical and present district boundaries ==
Table of United States congressional district boundary maps in the State of Idaho, presented chronologically. All redistricting events that took place in Idaho between 1973 and 2013 are shown.

Year	Statewide map	Boise highlight
1973–1982		
1983–1992		
1993–2002		
2003–2013		
2013–2023		

== See also ==
- List of United States congressional districts
