= Russ Fulcher =

American businessman & politician (born 1962)

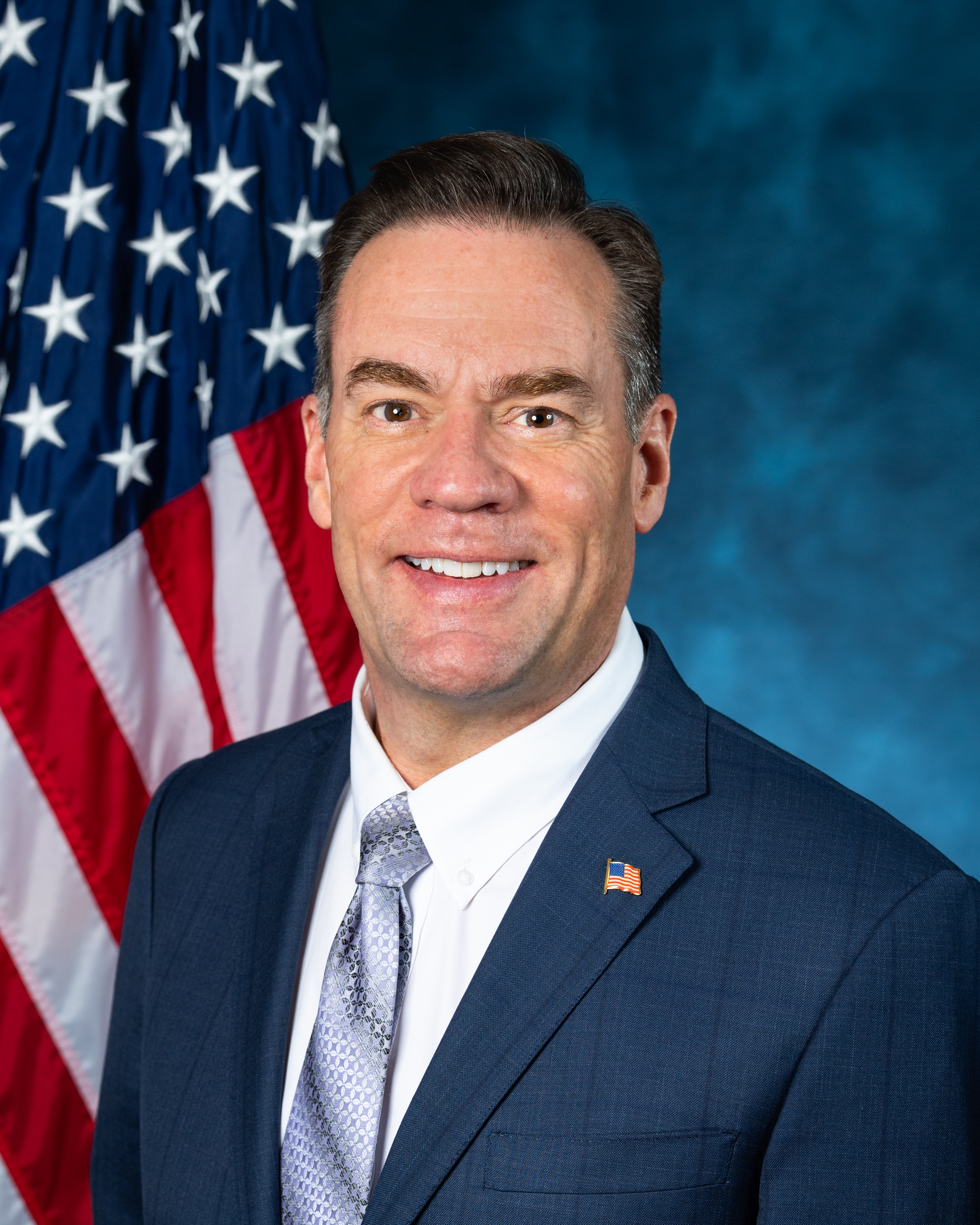
- Official portrait, 2018

Member of the U.S. House of Representatives from Idaho's 1st district
- Incumbent
- Assumed office January 3, 2019
- Preceded by: Raúl Labrador

Member of the Idaho Senate
- In office December 1, 2005 – December 1, 2014
- Preceded by: Jack Noble
- Succeeded by: Lori Den Hartog
- Constituency: 21st district (2005–2012); 22nd district (2012–2014)

Personal details
- Born: Russell Mark Fulcher; March 9, 1962 (age 64) Boise, Idaho, U.S.
- Party: Republican
- Spouse: Kara Fulcher (m. 1987; div. 2018)
- Children: 3
- Education: Boise State University (BBA, MBA)
- Website: House website Campaign website
- Fulcher's voice Fulcher opposing the Great American Outdoors Act. Recorded July 22, 2020

Russell Mark Fulcher (born March 9, 1962) is an American businessman and politician serving as the U.S. representative for Idaho's 1st congressional district since 2019. Previously, he served in the Idaho Senate from 2005 to 2014. A member of the Republican Party, Fulcher previously sought the party's nomination in the 2014 Idaho gubernatorial election, unsuccessfully challenging incumbent Butch Otter in the primary.

Fulcher was first elected to Congress in 2018. A conservative, Fulcher is a member of the Freedom Caucus.

== Early life and education ==
A fourth-generation Idahoan, Fulcher was born in Boise, Idaho, but grew up on a dairy farm in Meridian, Idaho. He received both a bachelor's and master's degree in business administration from Boise State University in 1984 and 1988, respectively. He also completed a course and was certified in electronic engineering through Micron Technology.

== Career ==
While a member of the Idaho legislature, Fulcher worked as a broker in the commercial real estate business. Before that, he was involved in Idaho's technology industry. Fulcher spent much of that time working in international business development with Micron Technology.

=== Idaho Senate ===
==== Idaho Senate District 21 ====
In 2005, Governor Dirk Kempthorne appointed Fulcher to the Idaho State Senate, representing the 21st legislative district, which encompasses large parts of Boise, Meridian and Kuna, to replace Jack Noble, who resigned after a conflict of interest. Fulcher was first elected in 2006 and served through 2012.

==== Idaho Senate District 22 ====
Fulcher represented District 22 in the Idaho Senate from 2012 to 2014. He served as Majority Caucus Leader from 2008 to 2012 and from 2013 to 2014.

===== Committees =====
Fulcher served on the following committees:

- Senate Education Committee (Member)
- Senate State Affairs Committee (Vice-chairman)

== U.S. House of Representatives ==
=== Elections ===
==== 2018 ====
On June 15, 2017, Fulcher announced that he would seek the Republican nomination for Idaho's 1st congressional district in the 2018 election.

He was endorsed by the incumbent representative, Raúl Labrador, and Texas Senator Ted Cruz.

Fulcher won the Idaho Republican Party primary with 43.1% of the vote, defeating David H. Leroy, Luke Malek, Christy Perry, Michael Snyder, Alex Gallegos, and Nick Henderson. Fulcher won 18 of 19 counties in Idaho's 1st congressional district. He was one of two candidates to win his home county.

He won the general election in November with 62.7% of the vote, defeating Cristina McNeil (Democrat), W. Scott Howard (Libertarian), and Marvin "Pro-Life" Richardson (Constitution).

==== 2020 ====
Fulcher was reelected on November 3, 2020, with 67.8% of the vote, defeating Rudy Soto (Democrat) and Joe Evans (Libertarian).

=== Tenure ===
In December 2020, Fulcher was one of 126 Republican members of the House of Representatives to sign an amicus brief in support of Texas v. Pennsylvania, a lawsuit filed at the United States Supreme Court contesting the results of the 2020 presidential election, in which Joe Biden defeated incumbent Donald Trump. The Supreme Court declined to hear the case on the basis that Texas lacked standing under Article III of the Constitution to challenge the results of an election held by another state.

On December 1, 2023, Fulcher voted against the expulsion of Representative George Santos.

=== Committee assignments ===
For the 119th Congress:

- Committee on Energy and Commerce
  - Subcommittee on Commerce, Manufacturing and Trade
  - Subcommittee on Communications and Technology
  - Subcommittee on Oversight and Investigations
- Committee on Natural Resources
  - Subcommittee on Energy and Mineral Resources
  - Subcommittee on Federal Lands

=== Caucus memberships ===
- Freedom Caucus
- Republican Study Committee
- Congressional Western Caucus

== Political positions ==
=== Abortion ===
Fulcher opposes abortion from the point of conception. In 2007, while a member of the Idaho Senate, Fulcher introduced legislation requiring parental consent for minors seeking abortions.

During the 2018 election, Fulcher claimed he had passed more pro-life legislation than any other Idaho legislator. However, his campaign later clarified the claim, stating that included legislation that may not have become law and may not have been directly related to abortion.

While in the House of Representatives, Fulcher voted in favor of the Born-Alive Abortion Survivors Protection Act.

=== Antitrust ===
In September 2022, Fulcher was one of 39 Republicans to vote for the Merger Filing Fee Modernization Act of 2022, an antitrust package that increased filing fees for large corporate mergers that would in turn provide more funding for federal antitrust enforcement. The legislation was subsequently enacted as part of the Consolidated Appropriations Act, 2023.

=== Federal spending ===
In May 2023, Fulcher was among 71 Republicans who voted against final passage of the Fiscal Responsibility Act of 2023 in the House. The legislation was a bipartisan agreement between Biden and Speaker of the House Kevin McCarthy to suspend the federal debt ceiling until January 2025 and establish spending limits for fiscal years 2024 and 2025.

=== Healthcare ===
Fulcher opposed the Affordable Care Act and advocated for its repeal during the 2018 election. While in the Idaho Senate, Fulcher opposed legislation establishing a state run health insurance exchange under the Affordable Care Act. He advocated delaying the legislation until lawmakers could get a better understanding of the exchange's costs and rules, while questioning if the federal government would establish an exchange if Idaho failed to do so. During his 2014 gubernatorial campaign, he criticized incumbent governor Butch Otter for his support of establishing the state-run healthcare exchange.

In 2025, Fulcher supported changes to Medicaid included in the One Big Beautiful Bill Act, including work requirements for certain recipients. He argued those changes would save the program.

=== Israel ===
Following the October 7, 2023 Hamas attack on Israel, Fulcher expressed support for Israel's military response. On October 25, 2023, he voted in favor of House Resolution 771, which condemned the attack and reaffirmed American support for Israel. Fulcher subsequently voted in favor of the Israel Security Supplemental Appropriations Act, which provided funding to federal agencies for military assistance to Israel.

=== Taxation ===
In 2024, Fulcher introduced the Keep Every Extra Penny (KEEP) Act. The legislation would eliminate the federal income tax on overtime pay. A similar, but separate proposal became law with the passage of the One Big Beautiful Bill Act. That proposal allows eligible, single taxpayers to deduct up to $12,500 in qualifying overtime compensation annually and up to $25,000 for married couples filing jointly.

== Electoral history ==
Idaho Gubernatorial Republican Primary, 2014
Party	Candidate	Votes	%
Republican	Butch Otter (incumbent)	79,779	51.4
Republican	Russ Fulcher	67,694	43.6
Republican	Harley Brown	5,084	3.3
Republican	Walt Bayes	2,753	1.8
Total votes		155,310	100.0

Idaho 1st Congressional District Republican Primary, 2018
Party	Candidate	Votes	%
Republican	Russ Fulcher	42,793	43.1
Republican	David H. Leroy	15,451	15.6
Republican	Luke Malek	14,154	14.3
Republican	Christy Perry	11,110	11.2
Republican	Michael Snyder	10,255	10.3
Republican	Alex Gallegos	3,478	3.5
Republican	Nick Henderson	2,003	2.0
Total votes		99,244	100.0

Idaho 1st Congressional District General Election, 2018
Party	Candidate	Votes	%
Republican	Russ Fulcher	197,167	62.7
Democratic	Cristina McNeil	96,932	30.8
Independent	Natalie Fleming	6,188	2.0
Libertarian	W. Scott Howard	5,435	1.7
Independent	Paul Farmer	4,479	1.4
Constitution	Marvin "Pro-Life" Richardson	3,181	1.0
Independent	Gordon Counsil	1,054	0.3
Independent	Michael J. Rath (write-in)	91	0.0
Total votes		314,527	100.0
Republican hold			

Idaho 1st Congressional District Republican Primary, 2020
Party	Candidate	Votes	%
Republican	Russ Fulcher (incumbent)	93,879	79.9
Republican	Nicholas Jones	23,657	20.1
Total votes		117,536	100.0

Idaho 1st Congressional District General Election, 2020
Party	Candidate	Votes	%
Republican	Russ Fulcher (incumbent)	310,736	67.8
Democratic	Rudy Soto	131,380	28.7
Libertarian	Joe Evans	16,453	3.6
Write-ins	Pro-Life	7	0.0
Total votes		458,576	100.0
Republican hold			

Idaho 1st Congressional District General Election, 2022
Party	Candidate	Votes	%
Republican	Russ Fulcher (incumbent)	222,901	71.3
Democratic	Kaylee Peterson	82,261	26.3
Libertarian	Darian Drake	7,280	2.3
Total votes		312,442	100.0
Republican hold			

Idaho 1st Congressional District General Election, 2024
Party	Candidate	Votes	%
Republican	Russ Fulcher (incumbent)	331,049	71.0
Democratic	Patrick Largey	118,656	25.4
Libertarian	Matt Loesby	9,594	2.1
Constitution	Brendan Gomez	6,933	1.5
Total votes		466,232	100.0
Republican hold			

== Other political campaigns ==
=== 2014 gubernatorial race ===
On November 23, 2013, Fulcher announced his intention to run against incumbent governor Butch Otter in the 2014 Idaho gubernatorial election. He was endorsed by Congressman Raúl Labrador.

Fulcher lost to Otter in the May 2014 Republican primary, earning 43.6% of the vote.

=== 2016 presidential election ===
Fulcher was a Ted Cruz delegate at the 2016 Republican National Convention. He supported Donald Trump in the general election.

=== 2018 gubernatorial race ===
Fulcher announced on August 24, 2016, that he was running for governor.

On June 15, 2017, he announced that he was dropping out of the 2018 Idaho gubernatorial election and would instead run for Idaho's 1st congressional district in the 2018 cycle.

== Personal life ==
Fulcher was married to Kara Fulcher from 1987 to 2018. They have three adult children.

Fulcher is an Evangelical.

U.S. House of Representatives
Preceded by Raúl Labrador	Member of the U.S. House of Representatives from Idaho's 1st congressional district 2019–present	Incumbent
U.S. order of precedence (ceremonial)
Preceded by Lizzie Fletcher	United States representatives by seniority 200th	Succeeded by Chuy García
