= List of third-party and independent candidacies in United States Senate elections =

This is a list of notable performances of third party and independent candidates in elections to the United States Senate.

It is rare for candidates, other than those of the six parties which have succeeded as major parties (Federalist Party, Democratic-Republican Party, National Republican Party, Democratic Party, Whig Party, Republican Party), to take large shares of the vote in elections.

In some of the listed cases a faction or factions of a state's major party ran against each other, often making it difficult to ascertain which was the mainline candidate and which was the bolter; in such cases, those candidates which are not listed on a standard major party line are still listed, but are not considered traditional third party victories as often these candidates sat in Congress as affiliated party members (barring cases like Joe Lieberman who, upon winning re-election in 2006 as a third-party candidate, sat as an Independent Democrat).

Listed below are Senate elections in which a third party or independent candidate won at least 5.0% of the vote. Winners are shown in bold and marked "elected" or "re-elected".

== Indirect elections (before 1918) ==
Prior to the passage of the 17th Amendment, most states did not hold direct elections to the Senate, with senators instead being elected by the state legislatures. The results listed below are cases in which a third-party candidate won at least 5.0% of the legislative vote.

Notable third-party senatorial performances (1820s–1917)
Year	State	Party	Nominee	# Votes	% Votes	Place	Notes
1829	New York (special)	Anti-Masonic	Ambrose Spencer	22	14.77 / 100	3rd	
1830	Pennsylvania	Anti-Masonic	Harmar Denny	10	7.58 / 100	4th	
1831	New York	Anti-Masonic	Samuel Works	32	23.02 / 100	2nd	
1831	Pennsylvania – Class I (special)	Anti-Masonic	Richard Rush	30	22.56 / 100	3rd	
1832	Pennsylvania	Anti-Masonic	William Clark	28	21.05 / 100	2nd	
1833	New York (special)	Anti-Masonic	John C. Spencer	11	7.38 / 100	2nd	
1834	Pennsylvania – Class III (special)	Anti-Masonic	Amos Ellmaker	31	23.31 / 100	2nd	
1845	New York – Class I (special)	Native American	Jonathan Thompson	17	10.76 / 100	3rd	
1845	New York – Class III (special)	Native American	Harmon B. Cropsey	17	10.76 / 100	3rd	
1845	New York	Native American	Robert Taylor	15	10.14 / 100	3rd	
1849	New York	Free Soil	John Adams Dix	21	13.91 / 100	2nd	
1851	Massachusetts	Free Soil	Charles Sumner	?	10 / 100	**Elected**	
1855	Massachusetts (special)	American	Henry Wilson	255	62.81 / 100	**Elected**	
1855	Massachusetts (special)	American	Nahum F. Bryant	85	20.94 / 100	2nd	
1857	New York	American	Joel T. Headley	15	10.71 / 100	3rd	
1879	Pennsylvania	Greenback Party	Daniel Agnew	16	6.38 / 100	3rd	
1894	Nebraska	Independent	W. A. Jones	18	13.64 / 100	2nd	
1898	Nebraska	People's	William V. Allen	58	43.94 / 100	2nd	
1901	Nebraska	People's	William V. Allen	58	44.62 / 100	2nd	

== Direct elections (after 1905) ==
=== 1900–1930 ===
Notable third-party senatorial performances (1900s–1930)
Year	State	Party	Nominee	# Votes	% Votes	Place
1905	Oregon (special)	Socialist	J. D. Stevens	12,485	15.17 / 100	2nd
1905	Oregon (special)	Prohibition	Hiram Gould	8,224	9.99 / 100	3rd
1906	Oregon	Socialist	A. G. Simola	5,608	6.1 / 100	3rd
1910	Nevada	Socialist	Jud Harris	1,959	9.62 / 100	3rd
1912	Arizona (special) – Class I	Socialist	E. Johnson	1,234	5.68 / 100	3rd
1912	Arizona (special) – Class III	Socialist	E. B. Simonton	1,221	5.8 / 100	3rd
1912	Colorado	Progressive	Frank D. Catlin	58,649	23.48 / 100	3rd
1912	Kansas	Socialist	Allan W. Ricker	25,610	7.32 / 100	3rd
1912	Montana	Progressive	Joseph M. Dixon	22,161	32.1 / 100	2nd
1912	Nevada (special)	Socialist	G. A. Steele	2,740	13.73 / 100	3rd
1912	Nevada (special)	Progressive	Sardis Summerfield	1,428	7.15 / 100	4th
1912	Oklahoma	Socialist	John G. Wills	40,860	16.3 / 100	3rd
1912	Oregon	Independent	Jonathan Bourne Jr.	25,929	19.41 / 100	3rd
1912	Oregon	Socialist	Benjamin Franklin Ramp	11,093	8.31 / 100	4th
1912	Oregon	Progressive	A. E. Clark	11,083	8.3 / 100	5th
1912	Oregon	Prohibition	B. Lee Paget	6,848	5.13 / 100	6th
1914	Arizona	Prohibition	Eugene W. Chafin	7,293	15.05 / 100	3rd
1914	Arizona	Socialist	Bert Davis	3,582	7.39 / 100	4th
1914	Arizona	Progressive	J. Bernard Nelson	2,608	5.38 / 100	5th
1914	California	Progressive	Francis J. Heney	255,232	28.81 / 100	2nd
1914	California	Socialist	Ernest Untermann	3,582	7.39 / 100	4th
1914	Colorado	Progressive	Benjamin Griffith	27,072	10.69 / 100	3rd
1914	Colorado	Socialist	J. C. Griffiths	13,943	5.51 / 100	4th
1914	Idaho	Progressive	Paul Clagstone	10,321	9.54 / 100	3rd
1914	Idaho	Socialist	Calistus W. Cooper	7,888	7.29 / 100	4th
1914	Illinois	Progressive	Raymond Robins	203,027	19.99 / 100	3rd
1914	Indiana	Progressive	Albert J. Beveridge	108,581	16.81 / 100	3rd
1914	Iowa	Independent	Otis Spurgeon	24,490	5.73 / 100	3rd
1914	Kansas	Progressive	Victor Murdock	116,755	22.94 / 100	3rd
1914	Nevada	Socialist	Ashley Grant Miller	5,451	25.28 / 100	3rd
1914	North Dakota	Socialist	W. H. Brown	6,231	7.14 / 100	3rd
1914	Ohio	Progressive	Arthur Lovett Garford	67,509	6.31 / 100	3rd
1914	Oklahoma	Socialist	Patrick S. Nagle	52,259	20.99 / 100	3rd
1914	Oregon	Progressive	William Hanley	26,220	10.68 / 100	3rd
1914	Pennsylvania	Progressive	Gifford Pinchot	269,265	24.22 / 100	2nd
1914	Washington	Progressive	Ole Hanson	83,282	24.12 / 100	3rd
1914	Washington	Socialist	Adam H. Barth	30,234	8.76 / 100	4th
1916	Arizona	Socialist	W. S. Bradford	2,827	5.24 / 100	3rd
1916	California	Socialist	Walter Thomas Mills	49,341	5.25 / 100	3rd
1916	Minnesota	Prohibition	Willis Greenleaf Calderwood	78,425	20.58 / 100	3rd
1916	Montana	Socialist	Henry La Beau	9,292	5.54 / 100	3rd
1916	Nevada	Socialist	Ashley Grant Miller	9,507	28.91 / 100	3rd
1916	North Dakota	Socialist	E. R. Fry	8,472	7.91 / 100	3rd
1916	Washington	Socialist	Bruce Rogers	21,709	5.95 / 100	3rd
1916	Wisconsin	Socialist	Richard Elsner	28,908	6.85 / 100	3rd
1918	Massachusetts	Independent	Thomas W. Lawson	21,985	5.26 / 100	3rd
1918	Minnesota	Nationalist	Willis Greenleaf Calderwood	137,334	39.95 / 100	2nd
1918	Montana	Nationalist	Jeannette Rankin	26,013	23.14 / 100	3rd
1918	Nevada (special)	Independent	Anne Henrietta Martin	4,603	18.01 / 100	3rd
1918	Oregon (special)	Socialist	Martha Bean	19,014	15.47 / 100	2nd
1918	South Dakota	Independent	Orville V. Rafferty	5,560	5.98 / 100	3rd
1920	California	Prohibition	James S. Edwards	57,768	6.32 / 100	3rd
1920	Georgia	Independent	Harry S. Edwards	6,700	5.1 / 100	2nd
1920	Maryland	Independent	George D. Iverson Jr.	21,345	5.46 / 100	3rd
1920	Nevada	Independent	Anne Henrietta Martin	4,981	18.16 / 100	3rd
1920	New York	Socialist	Jacob Panken	208,155	7.6 / 100	3rd
1920	New York	Prohibition	Ella A. Boole	159,623	5.83 / 100	4th
1920	Pennsylvania	Prohibition	Leah C. Marion	132,610	7.44 / 100	3rd
1920	South Dakota	Nonpartisan League	Tom Ayres	44,309	24.06 / 100	2nd
1920	South Dakota	Independent	Richard Olsen Richards	10,032	5.45 / 100	4th
1920	Washington	Farmer–Labor	C. L. France	99,309	25.8 / 100	2nd
1920	Wisconsin	Progressive Republican	James Thompson	235,029	34.71 / 100	2nd
1920	Wisconsin	Socialist	Frank J. Weber	66,172	9.77 / 100	4th
1922	California	Independent	H. Clay Needham	70,748	7.79 / 100	3rd
1922	California	Socialist	Upton Sinclair	56,982	6.28 / 100	4th
1922	Florida	Independent Republican	W. C. Lawson	6,074	11.73 / 100	2nd
1922	Minnesota	Farmer–Labor	Henrik Shipstead	325,372	47.1 / 100	**Elected**
1922	Pennsylvania (special)	Prohibition	Rachel C. Robinson	60,390	6.05 / 100	2nd
1922	Pennsylvania (special)	Socialist	William J. Van Essen	55,703	5.58 / 100	3rd
1922	Pennsylvania	Progressive	William J. Burke	127,180	8.82 / 100	3rd
1922	Washington	Farmer–Labor	James A. Duncan	35,326	12.0 / 100	3rd
1923	Minnesota (special)	Farmer–Labor	Magnus Johnson	290,165	57.48 / 100	
1924	Colorado	Farmer–Labor	Morton Alexander	16,039	5.04 / 100	3rd
1924	Colorado (special)	Farmer–Labor	Charles T. Phelps	17,542	5.52 / 100	3rd
1924	Minnesota	Farmer–Labor	Magnus Johnson	380,646	45.5 / 100	2nd
1924	Oregon	Progressive	F. E. Coulter	20,379	7.7 / 100	3rd
1924	South Dakota	Farmer–Labor	Tom Ayres	23,962	12.2 / 100	3rd
1924	South Dakota	Independent	George W. Egan	14,390	7.23 / 100	4th
1926	Idaho	Progressive	H. F. Samuels	37,047	29.6 / 100	2nd
1926	Illinois	Independent Republican	Hugh S. Magill	156,245	8.69 / 100	3rd
1926	New York	Independent Republican	Franklin W. Cristman	231,906	8.16 / 100	3rd
1926	North Dakota (special)	Nonpartisan League	Gerald Nye	79,709	50.2 / 100	**Re-elected**
1926	North Dakota (special)	Independent Republican	C. P. Stone	19,586	12.33 / 100	3rd
1926	North Dakota	Independent Republican	Norris H. Nelson	18,951	12.22 / 100	2nd
1926	North Dakota	Independent Republican	C. P. Stone	9,738	6.28 / 100	4th
1926	Oregon	Independent	Robert N. Stanfield	50,246	22.46 / 100	3rd
1926	South Dakota	Farmer–Labor	Howard Platt	12,797	7.2 / 100	3rd
1926	Wisconsin	Independent Progressive Republican	Charles D. Rosa	111,122	20.37 / 100	2nd
1926	Wisconsin	Socialist	Leo Krzycki	31,317	5.74 / 100	4th
1928	California	Prohibition	Charles Hiram Randall	92,106	5.94 / 100	3rd
1928	Minnesota	Farmer–Labor	Henrik Shipstead	665,169	65.38 / 100	**Re-elected**
1928	Wisconsin	Independent Republican	William H. Markham	81,302	10.95 / 100	2nd
1930	Alabama	Independent	James Thomas Heflin	100,952	40.07 / 100	2nd
1930	Minnesota	Farmer–Labor	Ernest Lundeen	178,671	22.89 / 100	3rd
1930	Oregon	Independent	Llewellyn A. Banks	17,488	7.4 / 100	3rd
1930	Virginia	Independent	J. Cloyd Byars	26,091	17.87 / 100	2nd
1930	Virginia	Socialist	Joe C. Morgan	7,944	5.45 / 100	3rd

=== 1931–1960 ===
Notable third-party senatorial performances (1931–1960)
Year	State	Party	Nominee	# Votes	% Votes	Place	Notes
1932	Arkansas (special)	Independent	Rex Floyd	1,752	5.16 / 100	2nd	
1932	California	Prohibition	Robert P. Shuler	560,088	25.77 / 100	3rd	
1932	Kansas	Independent	George A. Brown	65,583	9.1 / 100	3rd	
1932	Wisconsin	Socialist	Emil Seidel	65,807	6.14 / 100	3rd	
1934	California	Socialist	George Ross Kirkpatrick	108,748	5.29 / 100	2nd	
1934	Minnesota	Farmer–Labor	Henrik Shipstead	503,379	49.87 / 100	**Re-elected**	
1934	New York	Socialist	Norman Thomas	194,952	5.27 / 100	3rd	
1934	Tennessee (special)	Independent	John Randolph Neal Jr.	49,773	19.91 / 100	2nd	
1934	Wisconsin	Progressive	Robert M. La Follette Jr.	440,513	47.78 / 100	**Re-elected**	
1936	Delaware	Independent Republican	Robert G. Houston	6,897	5.44 / 100	3rd	
1936	Massachusetts	Union	Thomas C. O'Brien	134,245	7.44 / 100	3rd	
1936	Minnesota (special)	Independent	Nathaniel John Holmburg	210,364	28.42 / 100	2nd	
1936	Minnesota (special)	Independent Progressive	Andrew Olaf Devold	147,858	19.98 / 100	3rd	
1936	Minnesota	Farmer–Labor	Ernest Lundeen	663,363	62.24 / 100	**Elected**	
1936	Montana	Independent	Joseph P. Monaghan	39,655	17.91 / 100	3rd	
1936	Nebraska	Independent	George W. Norris	258,700	43.82 / 100	**Re-elected**	
1936	Rhode Island	Union	Ludger LaPointe	21,495	7.01 / 100	3rd	
1937	Arkansas (special)	Independent	John E. Miller	65,802	60.5 / 100	**Elected**	
1938	Connecticut	Socialist	Bellani Trombley	99,282	15.75 / 100	3rd	
1938	North Dakota	Independent	William Langer	112,007	42.56 / 100	2nd	
1938	Wisconsin	Progressive	Herman Ekern	249,209	26.58 / 100	2nd	
1940	California	Prohibition	Fred Dyster	366,044	13.51 / 100	2nd	
1940	Minnesota	Farmer–Labor	Elmer Austin Benson	310,875	25.7 / 100	2nd	
1940	North Dakota	Progressive Republican	William Lemke	92,593	35.06 / 100	2nd	
1940	Wisconsin	Progressive	Robert M. La Follette Jr.	605,609	45.26 / 100	**Re-elected**	
1942	Minnesota (special)	Farmer–Labor	Al Hansen	177,008	26.66 / 100	2nd	
1942	Minnesota	Farmer–Labor	Elmer Austin Benson	213,965	28.21 / 100	2nd	
1942	Minnesota	Independent Progressive	Martin A. Nelson	109,226	14.4 / 100	3rd	
1942	Nebraska	Independent	George W. Norris	108,899	28.64 / 100	2nd	
1942	Virginia	Socialist	Lawrence S. Wilkes	5,690	6.53 / 100	2nd	
1944	North Dakota	Independent	Lynn U. Stambaugh	44,596	21.19 / 100	3rd	
1944	Wisconsin	Progressive	Harry Sauthoff	73,089	5.82 / 100	3rd	
1946	North Dakota	Independent	Arthur E. Thompson	38,804	23.46 / 100	2nd	
1946	North Dakota (special)	Independent	Gerald Nye	20,848	15.24 / 100	3rd	
1946	Tennessee	Independent	John Randolph Neal Jr.	11,516	5.27 / 100	3rd	
1948	Arkansas	Independent	Arthur E. Thompson	15,821	6.81 / 100	2nd	
1950	Alabama	Independent	John G. Crommelin	38,477	23.46 / 100	2nd	
1950	New Hampshire	Independent (write-in)	Wesley Powell	11,958	6.28 / 100	2nd	
1952	California	Progressive	Reuben W. Borough	542,270	11.95 / 100	2nd	
1952	Maine	Independent Democrat	Earl S. Grant	15,294	6.45 / 100	3rd	
1952	New York	Liberal	George Counts	489,775	7.02 / 100	3rd	
1952	North Dakota	Independent (write-in)	Fred G. Aandahl	24,741	10.4 / 100	3rd	
1952	Virginia	Independent Democrat	H.M. Vise Sr.	69,133	12.92 / 100	2nd	
1952	Virginia	Social Democratic	Clarke T. Robb	67,281	12.57 / 100	3rd	
1954	South Carolina	Independent Democrat (write-in)	Strom Thurmond	143,444	63.13 / 100	**Elected**	
1954	Virginia	Independent Democrat	Charles W. Lewis Jr.	32,681	10.66 / 100	2nd	
1954	Virginia	Social Democratic	Clarke T. Robb	28,922	9.44 / 100	3rd	
1958	Utah	Independent	J. Bracken Lee	77,013	26.44 / 100	3rd	
1958	Virginia	Independent	Louise Wensel	120,224	26.27 / 100	2nd	
1960	Virginia	Independent Democrat	Stuart D. Baker	88,718	14.27 / 100	2nd	

=== 1961–1990 ===
Notable third-party senatorial performances (1961–1990)
Year	State	Party	Nominee	# Votes	% Votes	Place	Notes
1964	Virginia	Independent	James W. Respess	95,526	10.29 / 100	3rd	
1966	Mississippi	Independent	Clifton R. Whitley	30,502	7.74 / 100	3rd	
1966	Virginia (special)	Independent	John W. Carter	57,692	7.91 / 100	3rd	
1966	Virginia	Independent	F. Lee Hawthorne	58,251	7.94 / 100	3rd	
1968	Alabama	National Democratic	Robert Schwenn	72,699	7.97 / 100	3rd	
1968	Alaska	Democratic (write-in)	Ernest Gruening	14,118	17.44 / 100	3rd	
1968	Maryland	American Independent	George P. Mahoney	148,467	13.09 / 100	3rd	
1968	New York	Conservative	James L. Buckley	1,139,402	17.31 / 100	3rd	
1970	Connecticut	Independent	Thomas J. Dodd	266,497	24.46 / 100	3rd	
1970	Mississippi	Independent	William R. Thompson	37,593	11.6 / 100	2nd	
1970	New York	Conservative	James L. Buckley	2,288,190	38.95 / 100	**Elected**	
1970	Virginia	Independent	Harry F. Byrd Jr.	506,237	53.54 / 100	**Re-elected**	
1972	Louisiana	Independent	John McKeithen	250,161	23.06 / 100	2nd	
1974	Florida	American Independent	John Grady	282,659	15.7 / 100	3rd	
1974	Hawaii	People's	James D. Kimmel	42,767	17.09 / 100	2nd	
1974	New York	Conservative	Barbara A. Keating	822,584	15.93 / 100	3rd	
1974	Utah	American	Bruce Bangerter	24,966	5.94 / 100	3rd	
1976	Minnesota	American Independent	Paul Helm	125,612	6.57 / 100	3rd	
1976	Virginia	Independent	Harry F. Byrd Jr.	890,778	57.2 / 100	**Re-elected**	
1978	Alabama	Prohibition	Jerome B. Couch	34,951	6.01 / 100	2nd	
1978	Arkansas	Independent	John J. Black	37,488	7.18 / 100	3rd	
1978	Maine	Independent	Hayes E. Gahagan	27,824	7.42 / 100	3rd	
1978	Mississippi	Independent	Charles Evers	133,646	22.64 / 100	3rd	
1980	New York	Liberal	Jacob Javits	664,544	11.1 / 100	3rd	
1982	Washington	Independent	King Lysen	72,297	5.28 / 100	3rd	
1984	Tennessee	Independent	Ed McAteer	87,234	5.29 / 100	3rd	
1990	Virginia	Independent	Nancy B. Spannaus	196,755	18.16 / 100	2nd	

=== 1991–2020 ===
Notable third-party senatorial performances (1991–2020)
Year	State	Party	Nominee	# Votes	% Votes	Place	Notes
1992	Alaska	Green	Mary Jordan	20,019	8.35 / 100	3rd	
1992	Arizona	Independent	Evan Mecham	145,361	10.52 / 100	3rd	
1992	Hawaii	Green	Linda B. Martin	49,921	13.73 / 100	3rd	
1992	Louisiana	Independent	Jon Khachaturian	74,785	8.87 / 100	2nd	
1992	Ohio	Independent	Martha Grevatt	331,125	6.89 / 100	3rd	
1994	Arizona	Libertarian	Scott Grainger	75,493	6.75 / 100	3rd	
1994	Minnesota	Independence	Dean Barkley	95,400	5.38 / 100	3rd	
1994	Ohio	Independent	Joseph J. Slovenec	252,031	7.33 / 100	3rd	
1994	Vermont	Independent	Gavin T. Mills	12,465	5.89 / 100	3rd	
1994	Virginia	Independent	Marshall Coleman	235,324	11.44 / 100	3rd	
1996	Alaska	Green	Jed Whittaker	29,037	12.52 / 100	2nd	
1996	Minnesota	Reform	Dean Barkley	152,333	6.98 / 100	3rd	
2000	Arizona	Independent	William Toel	109,230	7.82 / 100	2nd	
2000	Arizona	Green	Vance Hansen	108,926	7.8 / 100	3rd	
2000	Arizona	Libertarian	Barry J. Hess, II	70,724	5.06 / 100	4th	
2000	Massachusetts	Libertarian	Carla Howell	308,860	11.88 / 100	3rd	
2000	Minnesota	Independence	James Gibson	140,583	6.98 / 100	3rd	
2002	Alaska	Green	Jim Sykes	16,608	7.24 / 100	3rd	
2002	Kansas	Libertarian	Steven A. Rosile	70,725	9.1 / 100	2nd	
2002	Kansas	Reform	George Cook	65,050	8.37 / 100	3rd	
2002	Massachusetts	Libertarian	Michael E. Cloud	369,807	18.43 / 100	2nd	
2002	Mississippi	Reform	Shawn O'Hara	97,226	15.42 / 100	2nd	
2002	Oklahoma	Independent	James Germalic	65,056	6.39 / 100	3rd	
2002	Virginia	Independent	Nancy B. Spannaus	145,102	9.74 / 100	2nd	
2002	Virginia	Independent	Jacob G. Hornberger Jr.	106,055	7.12 / 100	3rd	
2004	Oklahoma	Independent	Sheila Bilyeu	86,663	5.99 / 100	3rd	
2006	Connecticut	Connecticut for Lieberman	Joe Lieberman	564,095	49.71 / 100	**Re-elected**	
2006	Indiana	Libertarian	Steve Osborn	168,820	12.59 / 100	2nd	
2006	Maine	Independent	William H. Slavick	29,230	5.37 / 100	3rd	
2006	Vermont	Independent	Bernie Sanders	171,638	65.41 / 100	**Elected**	
2008	Arkansas	Green	Rebekah Kennedy	207,076	20.47 / 100	2nd	
2008	Idaho	Independent	Rex Rammell	34,510	5.35 / 100	3rd	
2008	Minnesota	Independence	Dean Barkley	437,505	15.15 / 100	3rd	
2008	Oregon	Constitution	Dave Brownlow	92,565	5.24 / 100	3rd	
2010	Alaska	Republican (write-in)	Lisa Murkowski	101,091	39.49 / 100	**Re-elected**	
2010	Florida	Independent	Charlie Crist	1,607,549	29.71 / 100	2nd	
2010	Indiana	Libertarian	Rebecca Sink-Burris	94,330	5.41 / 100	3rd	
2010	South Carolina	Green	Tom Clements	121,472	9.21 / 100	3rd	
2010	Utah	Constitution	Scott N. Bradley	35,937	5.67 / 100	3rd	
2012	Indiana	Libertarian	Andy Horning	145,374	5.67 / 100	3rd	
2012	Maine	Independent	Angus King	370,580	52.89 / 100	**Elected**	
2012	Maryland	Independent	Rob Sobhani	430,934	16.37 / 100	3rd	
2012	Missouri	Libertarian	Jonathan Dine	165,468	6.07 / 100	3rd	
2012	Montana	Libertarian	Dan Cox	31,892	6.56 / 100	3rd	
2012	Vermont	Independent	Bernie Sanders	209,053	71.04 / 100	**Re-elected**	
2014	Kansas	Independent	Greg Orman	368,372	42.53 / 100	2nd	
2014	South Dakota	Independent	Larry Pressler	47,741	17.09 / 100	3rd	
2014	Wyoming	Independent	Curt Gottshall	13,311	7.9 / 100	3rd	
2016	Alaska	Libertarian	Joe Miller	90,825	29.16 / 100	2nd	
2016	Alaska	Independent	Margaret Stock	41,194	13.23 / 100	3rd	
2016	Arizona	Green	Gary Swing	138,634	5.48 / 100	3rd	
2016	Idaho	Constitution	Ray J. Writz	41,677	6.14 / 100	3rd	
2016	Indiana	Libertarian	Lucy Brenton	149,481	5.47 / 100	3rd	
2016	Kansas	Libertarian	Robert Garrard	63,428	5.52 / 100	3rd	
2018	Maine	Independent	Angus King	337,378	54.5 / 100	**Re-elected**	
2018	New Mexico	Libertarian	Gary Johnson	105,916	15.4 / 100	3rd	
2018	Vermont	Independent	Bernie Sanders	183,529	67.32 / 100	**Re-elected**	
2020	Alaska	Independent	Al Gross	146,068	41.20 / 100	2nd	
2020	Arkansas	Libertarian	Ricky Dale Harrington Jr.	399,390	33.47 / 100	2nd	
2020	Minnesota	Legal Marijuana Now	Kevin O'Connor	190,154	5.91 / 100	3rd	
2020	Nebraska	Democratic (write-in)	Preston Love Jr.	58,411	6.28 / 100	3rd	
2020	Nebraska	Libertarian	Gene Siadek	55,115	5.93 / 100	4th	

=== 2021–present ===
Notable third-party senatorial performances (2021–present)
Year	State	Party	Nominee	# Votes	% Votes	Place
2022	Idaho	Independent	Scott Cleveland	49,924	8.4 / 100	3rd
2022	North Dakota	Independent	Rick Becker	44,305	18.5 / 100	3rd
2022	Utah	Independent	Evan McMullin	450,081	42.7 / 100	2nd
2024	Maine	Independent	Angus King	423,369	51.8 / 100	**Re-elected**
2024	Nebraska	Independent	Dan Osborn	427,343	46.4 / 100	2nd
2024	Utah	Independent American	Carlton Bowen	73,823	5.7 / 100	3rd
2024	Vermont	Independent	Bernie Sanders	229,904	63.3 / 100	**Re-elected**
2026	Idaho	Independent	Todd Achilles	239,422	33.6 / 100	2nd
2026	Idaho	Independent	Natalie Fleming	50,134	7.0 / 100	3rd
2026	Montana	Independent	Seth Bodnar	184,551	37.7 / 100	2nd
2026	Nebraska	Independent	Dan Osborn	338,509	44.1 / 100	2nd
2026	South Dakota	Independent	Brian Bengs	120,513	39.5 / 100	2nd

== See also ==
- List of third-party performances in United States House elections
