= 2026 United States Senate election in Nebraska =

- November 3, 2026
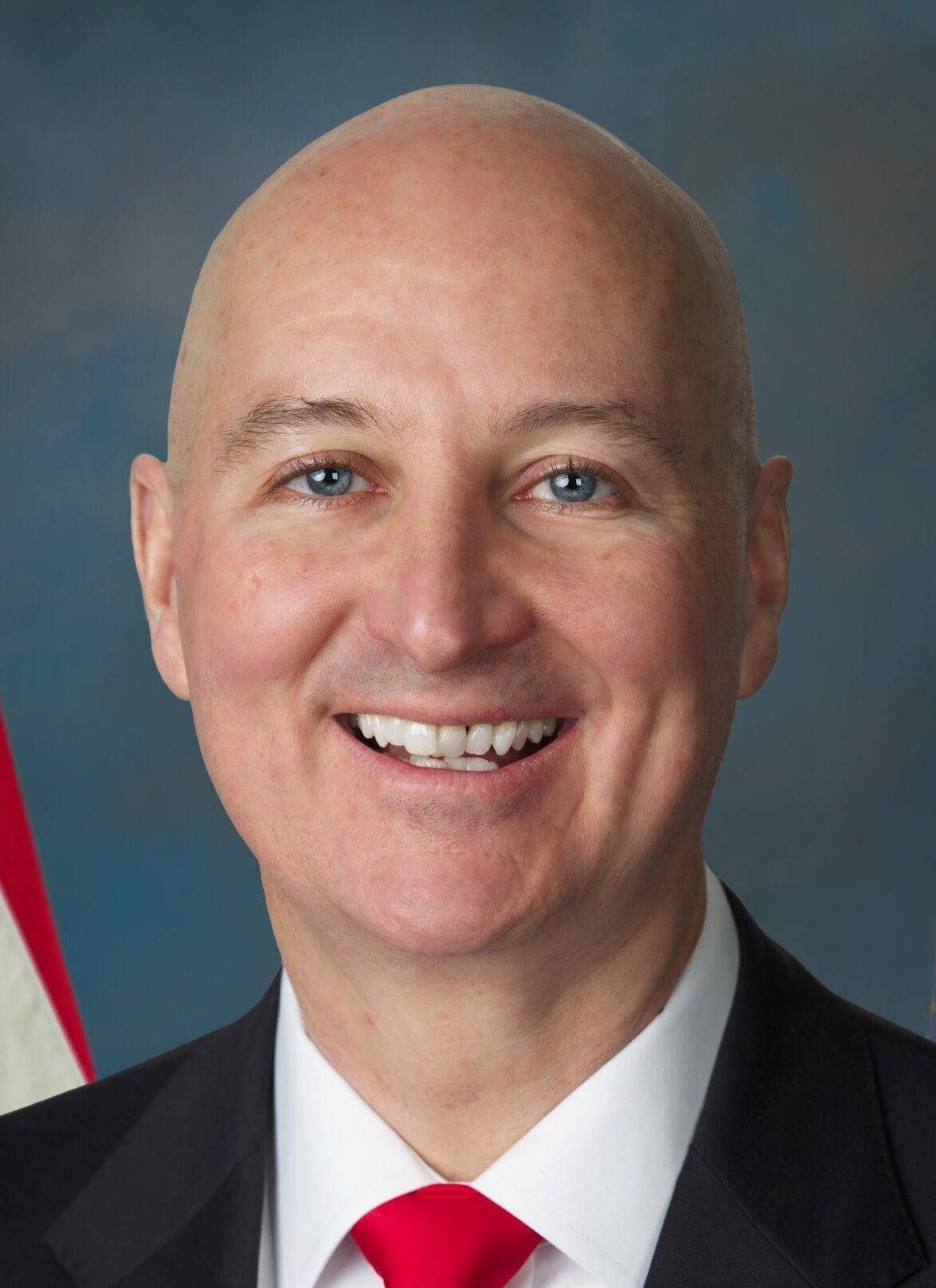

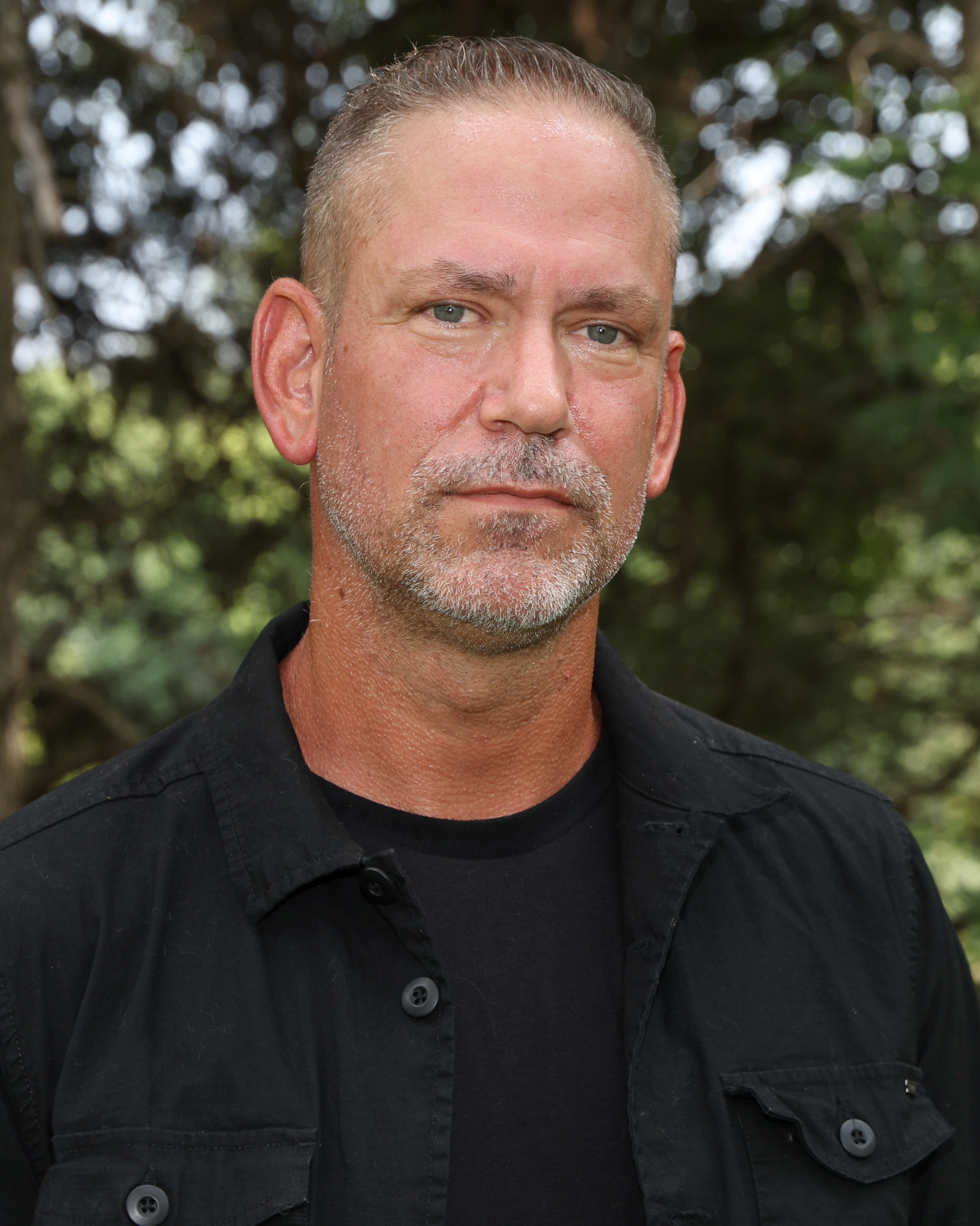
Nominee	Pete Ricketts	Dan Osborn
Party	Republican	Independent
Popular vote	382,171	338,509
Percentage	49.85%	44.15%
- Ricketts: 40–50% 50–60% 60–70% 70–80% 80–90% Osborn: 40–50% 50–60%
U.S. senator before election
Pete Ricketts
Republican
Elected U.S. senator
Pete Ricketts
Republican

The 2026 United States Senate election in Nebraska was held on November 3, 2026, to elect a member of the United States Senate to represent the state of Nebraska. Republican incumbent Pete Ricketts won his first full term, defeating independent former union leader Dan Osborn.

Primary elections were held on May 12. Ricketts, who was appointed in 2023 and elected to a shortened term in a special race the following year, won the Republican nomination with 81.8% of the vote against minimal opposition. Following his competitive 2024 campaign, Osborn was endorsed by the Nebraska Democratic Party, but pastor William Forbes sought the nomination amid spoiler accusations. In response, former pharmacy technician Cindy Burbank launched a primary candidacy supported by the party and defeated Forbes with 89.2% of the vote before dropping out to support Osborn.

== Background ==
Republicans have not lost a Senate election in Nebraska since Democratic incumbent Ben Nelson was re-elected to a second term in 2006, defeating future senator Pete Ricketts in his first political campaign. The last independent to win a Senate election in Nebraska was George W. Norris when he ran for a fifth term in 1936 after previously serving as a Republican.

This election was the first in which a state did not have a Democratic candidate in back-to-back US Senate election cycles. Nebraska was one of three states (along with Idaho and South Dakota) where the Democratic nominee withdrew from the race, to effectively endorse the independent candidate.

== Republican primary ==
=== Candidates ===
==== Nominee ====
- Pete Ricketts, incumbent U.S. senator

==== Eliminated in primary ====
- Todd Knobel, entrepreneur
- Eric Mortimore
- Debb Axtell Schultz
- Mac Stevens, realtor and candidate for U.S. Senate in 2024

=== Endorsements ===
Pete Ricketts

Executive branch officials

- Donald Trump, president of the United States (2017–2021, 2025–present)

Organizations

- AIPAC
- Club for Growth
- Nebraska Farm Bureau

=== Fundraising ===
Campaign finance reports as of April 22, 2026
Candidate	Raised	Spent	Cash on hand
Pete Ricketts (R)	$4,866,649	$4,281,083	$1,072,534
Source: Federal Election Commission

=== Results ===
Results by county Ricketts: 70–80%; 80–90%; 90–100%

Republican primary results
Party	Candidate	Votes	%
Republican	Pete Ricketts (incumbent)	160,547	81.5
Republican	Todd Knobel	15,921	8.1
Republican	Debb Axtel Schultz	11,735	6.0
Republican	Mac Stevens	5,204	2.6
Republican	Eric Mortimore	3,667	1.9
Total votes		197,074	100.0

== Independent ==
In the 2024 United States Senate election in Nebraska, union president Dan Osborn ran as an independent against Republican incumbent Deb Fischer, losing by fewer than seven points in one of Nebraska's closest Senate races. Osborn significantly outperformed Democratic nominee Preston Love Jr., who lost the concurrent special Senate election to Pete Ricketts by more than 24 points.

In early 2025, Osborn formed an exploratory committee for a potential 2026 run. In June 2026, he submitted a petition to appear on the general election ballot as an independent, which was verified the following month.

Although Osborn was not affiliated with the Nebraska Democratic Party, the party supported his candidacy, citing their greater alignment with his platform.

=== Candidate ===
Declared

- Dan Osborn, former president of BCTGM International Union Local 50G and candidate for U.S. Senate in 2024

Fundraising

Campaign finance reports as of April 22, 2026
Candidate	Raised	Spent	Cash on hand
Dan Osborn (I)	$3,856,314	$2,784,328	$1,135,152
Source: Federal Election Commission

== Democratic primary ==
=== Background ===
Jane Kleeb, the chair of the Nebraska Democratic Party, said the party did not intend to recruit a candidate, similar to the Nebraska Senate race in 2024. In August 2025, the party endorsed Dan Osborn, an independent candidate.

In March 2026, the party called for Democratic candidate William Forbes to withdraw, with Kleeb accusing him of trying to "trick voters" and opposing abortion access. She urged Democrats to support Osborn instead. In an interview with CNN, Forbes acknowledged that he had voted for Donald Trump in multiple elections, but insisted that he was a lifelong Democrat.

After Forbes entered the race retired pharmacy technician Cindy Burbank launched a primary candidacy endorsed by the state party. On March 17, 2026, Secretary of State of Nebraska Bob Evnen removed Burbank from the ballot following a complaint from Nebraska Republican Party that alleged she was not a good-faith candidate. Burbank filed a lawsuit in Lancaster County District Court immediately following the removal. On March 19, 2026, a District Court judge dismissed Burbank's lawsuit. On March 23, 2026, the Nebraska Supreme Court ruled that Evnen missed a deadline to consider complaints and reinstated Burbank to the ballot.

Burbank stated in April that she would consider leaving the race to "unify the votes" against Ricketts. She said in a phone interview a week before the primary that she intended to withdraw from the general election and would support Osborn if there was "no clear path to victory". She filed to be removed from the ballot on July 17, which was confirmed by Secretary of State Evnen on July 21.

After Burbank's withdrawal, Forbes filed a lawsuit which claimed the Nebraska Democratic Party must have a Senate candidate. An initial ruling by a Lancaster County judge stated that the attempt to force the party to field a candidate was unlikely to succeed and raised "serious constitutional concerns." The case was dismissed on August 26, 2026.

=== Candidates ===
==== Withdrew after nomination ====
- Cindy Burbank, retired pharmacy technician

==== Eliminated in primary ====
- William Forbes, pastor

=== Endorsements ===
Cindy Burbank (withdrawn)

Individuals

- Dan Osborn, candidate for U.S. Senate (Independent) (Note: Endorsement only applicable for the primary election.)

Political parties

- Nebraska Democratic Party

=== Fundraising ===
Campaign finance reports as of April 22, 2026
Candidate	Raised	Spent	Cash on hand
Cindy Burbank (D)	$4,296	$1,872	$2,423
Source: Federal Election Commission

=== Results ===
Results by county Burbank: 50–60%; 60–70%; 70–80%; 80–90%; 90–100%; Tie

Democratic primary results
Party	Candidate	Votes	%
Democratic	Cindy Burbank	110,210	89.5
Democratic	William Forbes	12,863	10.5
Total votes		123,073	100.0

== Third parties ==
=== America First Party ===
America First Party organizers submitted completed petitions to form a new party on July 15, 2026; registered voter signatures required to do so were verified by the Nebraska Secretary of State on August 7, 2026. After a ruling by the Nebraska Supreme Court on August 26, 2026, against the Nebraska Republican Party objections (which claimed the party's name would cause confusion for voters) the secretary confirmed the party's formation. Chuck Conboy, an account manager, is the party's nominee in this race.

==== Candidates ====
===== Nominee =====
- Chuck Conboy, account manager

=== Legal Marijuana NOW primary ===
Prior to the primary, Mark Elworth Jr., the former chair of the Legal Marijuana NOW party, accused Mike Marvin of being a "Dan Osborn plant". In addition, Republicans accused Marvin of planning to drop out and endorse Osborn if he won the nomination. Marvin has denied the allegations. Cindy Burbank, the Democratic nominee, paid for Marvin's $1,740 filing fee when the secretary of state refused to take his own check, which had the incorrect amount. Marvin did not submit the paperwork to be removed from the ballot before the August 3 deadline, but withdrew and endorsed Osborn on August 21, citing a health condition. He remained on the ballot.

==== Candidates ====
===== Withdrew after nomination =====
- Mike Marvin, former labor union official (endorsed Osborn, remained on ballot)

===== Eliminated in primary =====
- Earl Starkey

==== Results ====
Legal Marijuana Now primary results
Party	Candidate	Votes	%
Legal Marijuana Now	Mike Marvin	829	66.4
Legal Marijuana Now	Earl Starkey	420	33.6
Total votes		1,249	100.0

=== Nebraska Working People Party ===
Nebraska Working People Party organizers submitted completed petitions to form a new party on July 14 and was verified by the Secretary of State on August 7, 2026. After a ruling by the Nebraska Supreme Court on August 26, 2026, that the Nebraska Democratic Party's objection (claiming that the name is too similar to the Working Families Party) had been filed too late, the secretary confirmed the party's formation. Robin Richards, the party's chair, was the party's nominee in this race.

==== Candidates ====
===== Nominee =====
- Robin Richards, chair of the Nebraska Working People Party

== General election ==
According to The New York Times, the cost of living, inflation, AI data centers, and income inequality was leading issues during the election campaign.

Osborn vowed to ban "corporate PAC donations" and "a congressional stock trading ban". He "also raised concerns about farm bankruptcies and large investors buying agricultural land." He is a critic of AI data centers, and has cited it as an instance of the powerful plotting to undermine the contributions of everyday individuals. Ricketts supports the construction of AI data centers and called it a matter of "national security". On the campaign, he said that he favors the development of artificial general intelligence. Osborn portrayed him as an "out-of-touch billionaire".

If elected, Osborn vowed to form an "Independent Senatorial Caucus", separate from both major parties.

=== Predictions ===
Source	Ranking	As of
The Cook Political Report	Lean R	November 2, 2026
Decision Desk HQ	Lean R	November 3, 2026
The Economist (Note: The Economist's prediction model uses unconventional terminology. For the purpose of equivalency, their "Very Likely" ratings are formatted as a "Likely" rating while "Likely" ratings are formatted as a "Lean" rating.)	Likely R	November 3, 2026
FiftyPlusOne	Likely R	November 3, 2026
Fox News	Lean R	November 1, 2026
Inside Elections	Tilt R	October 29, 2026
MS NOW	Likely R	October 29, 2026
NBC News	Lean R	November 3, 2026
RealClearPolitics	Tossup	November 2, 2026
Sabato's Crystal Ball	Lean R	November 2, 2026
Silver Bulletin	Lean R	November 3, 2026
Split Ticket	Lean R	November 2, 2026

=== Endorsements ===
Pete Ricketts (R)

U.S. senators

- Ted Cruz, Texas (2013–present)
- John Kennedy, Louisiana (2017–present)

Organizations

- National Border Patrol Council
- National Federation of Independent Business
- Nebraska Fraternal Order of Police
Dan Osborn (I)

Executive branch officials

- Robert Reich, former secretary of labor (1993–1997) (Democratic)

Party officials

- Jane Kleeb, chair of the Nebraska Democratic Party (2016–present) (Democratic)

Individuals

- Mike Marvin, former labor union official and former candidate for this seat (Legal Marijuana NOW)

Labor unions

- American Federation of Government Employees
- Association of Flight Attendants
- Bakery, Confectionery, Tobacco Workers and Grain Millers International Union (BCTGM)
- Nebraska State Education Association
- National Education Association
- Nebraska AFL-CIO
- United Auto Workers

Organizations

- End Citizens United
- Joint Action Committee for Political Affairs
- Patriotic Millionaires
- Peace Action
- Progressive Change Campaign Committee
- Sierra Club
- J Street

Political parties

- Nebraska Democratic Party
- Nebraska Liberal Party
- Reform Party

=== Debates ===
2026 United States Senate election in Nebraska debates
No.	Date	Host	Moderator	Link	Republican	Independent
Key: P Participant A Absent N Not invited I Invited W Withdrawn						
Key: P Participant A Absent N Not invited I Invited W Withdrawn					Pete Ricketts	Dan Osborn
1	September 1, 2026	News Channel Nebraska; Nebraska State Fair	Dave Griek	YouTube	P	P

=== Fundraising ===
Campaign finance reports as of October 14, 2026
Candidate	Raised	Spent	Cash on hand
Pete Ricketts (R)	$14,546,959	$13,815,790	$1,218,139
Dan Osborn (I)	$11,029,845	$9,139,828	$1,953,183
Source: Federal Election Commission

=== Polling ===
Aggregate polls

Source of poll aggregation	Dates administered	Dates updated	Pete Ricketts (R)	Dan Osborn (I)	Other/ Undecided (Note: Calculated by taking the difference of 100% and all other candidates combined.)	Margin
270toWin	October 16 – November 1, 2026	November 2, 2026	47.6%	45.0%	7.4%	Ricketts +2.6%
Decision Desk HQ	through November 1, 2026	November 2, 2026	47.7%	45.6%	6.7%	Ricketts +2.1%
FiftyPlusOne	through November 1, 2026	November 3, 2026	48.1%	46.4%	5.5%	Ricketts +1.7%
Silver Bulletin	through November 1, 2026	November 3, 2026	47.7%	46.5%	5.8%	Ricketts +1.2%
Average			47.8%	45.9%	6.3%	Ricketts +1.9%

Poll source	Date(s) administered	Sample size (Note: Key: A – all adults RV – registered voters LV – likely voters V – unclear)	Margin of error	Pete Ricketts (R)	Dan Osborn (I)	Other	Undecided
GrayHouse (R)	October 29 – November 1, 2026	534 (LV)	± 4.2%	50% (Note: With voters who lean toward a given candidate)	44%	3%	—
GrayHouse (R)	October 29 – November 1, 2026	534 (LV)	± 4.2%	48%	44%	3%	5%
YouGov	October 26–29, 2026	1,979 (LV)	± 2.8%	49%	49%	1%	0%
National Public Affairs (R)	October 25–29, 2026	800 (LV)	± 3.5%	48%	45%	4% (Note: Mike Marvin (LMN) with 2%; Chuck Conboy (AF) with 1%; Robin Richards (NWP) with 1%)	3%
National Public Affairs (R)	October 25–29, 2026	800 (LV)	± 3.5%	49%	48%	—	4%
New York Times/Siena University	October 23–29, 2026	809 (LV)	± 4.0%	49%	43%	0%	8%
Echelon Insights (R) (Note: Poll conducted for NetChoice)	October 16–23, 2026	407 (LV)	± 6.3%	47%	46%	3% (Note: Robin Richards (NWP) with 2%; Chuck Conboy (AF) with 1%)	3%
GBAO (D) (Note: Poll sponsored by Working Class Majority PAC, which supports Osborn)	October 18–22, 2026	800 (LV)	± 3.5%	45%	46%	—	7%
Concord Public Opinion Partners (D) (Note: Poll sponsored by Education Reform Now Advocacy)	October 15–18, 2026	500 (LV)	± 4.4%	41%	48%	6%	5%
Impact Research (D) (Note: Poll sponsored by Osborn's campaign)	October 14–20, 2026	600 (LV)	± 4.0%	49%	47%	2%	1%
Impact Research (D)	October 14–20, 2026	600 (LV)	± 4.0%	50%	48%	—	1%
National Public Affairs (R)	October 15–18, 2026	598 (LV)	± 4.0%	46%	43%	5% (Note: Mike Marvin (LMN) with 2%; Chuck Conboy (AF) with 2%; Robin Richards (NWP) with 1%)	5%
National Public Affairs (R)	October 15–18, 2026	598 (LV)	± 4.0%	50%	47%	—	3%
National Public Affairs (R)	October 2–5, 2026	800 (LV)	± 4.0%	46%	43%	6% (Note: Mike Marvin (LMN), Robin Richards (NWP), and Chuck Conboy (AF) with 2% each)	5%
National Public Affairs (R)	October 2–5, 2026	800 (LV)	± 4.0%	49%	46%	—	6%
YouGov	September 24 – October 3, 2026	1,809 (LV)	± 3.3%	47%	48%	—	3%
co/efficient (R)	September 28–30, 2026	1,113 (LV)	± 2.92%	45%	40%	4% (Note: Mike Marvin (LMN) with 2%; Robin Richards (WPP) with 1%; Chuck Conboy (AF) with 1%)	11%
co/efficient (R)	September 28–30, 2026	1,113 (LV)	± 2.92%	48%	43%	—	8%
SurveyUSA (Note: Poll sponsored by Grant Forbes, LLC.)	September 8–13, 2026	503 (LV)	± 6.4%	42%	46%	4% (Note: "Another candidate" with 4%)	7%
GBAO (D)	September 3–8, 2026	800 (LV)	± 3.5%	46%	47%	—	7%
Impact Research (D)	August 9–13, 2026	600 (LV)	± 4.0%	47%	47%	—	5%
GBAO (D)	July 2026	—	—	47%	47%	—	5%
	May 12, 2026	Primary elections					
Tavern Research (D)	May 8–11, 2026	1,165 (LV)	± 3.5%	42%	47%	—	12%
GBAO (D)	April 2026	—	—	45%	46%	—	7%
Impact Research (D)	February 2–5, 2026	600 (LV)	± 4.0%	48%	47%	—	5%
Lake Research Partners (D)	December 11–17, 2025	900 (LV)	—	48%	47%	—	5%
Lake Research Partners (D)	July 23–29, 2025	900 (LV)	± 3.3%	46%	47%	—	7%
Change Research (D) (Note: Poll commissioned by Osborn's exploratory campaign)	March 28 – April 1, 2025	524 (LV)	± 4.6%	46%	45%	—	9%

Hypothetical polling

Pete Ricketts vs. Cindy Burbank

Poll source	Date(s) administered	Sample size	Margin of error	Pete Ricketts (R)	Cindy Burbank (D)	Undecided
Tavern Research (D)	May 8–11, 2026	1,165 (LV)	± 3.5%	48%	39%	13%

Pete Ricketts vs. William Forbes

Poll source	Date(s) administered	Sample size	Margin of error	Pete Ricketts (R)	William Forbes (D)	Undecided
Tavern Research (D)	May 8–11, 2026	1,165 (LV)	± 3.5%	50%	34%	16%

Pete Ricketts vs. generic Democrat

Poll source	Date(s) administered	Sample size	Margin of error	Pete Ricketts (R)	Generic Democrat	Undecided
Tavern Research (D)	May 8–11, 2026	1,165 (LV)	± 3.5%	49%	42%	9%

=== Results ===
2026 United States Senate election in Nebraska
Party	Candidate	Votes	%	±%
Republican	Pete Ricketts (incumbent)	382,171	49.85	
Independent	Dan Osborn	338,509	44.15	
Working People	Robin Richards	20,027	2.61	
Legal Marijuana NOW	Mike Marvin (withdrawn)	16,727	2.18	
America First	Chuck Conboy	9,267	1.21	
Total votes		766,701		
Republican hold				

== Notes ==
Partisan clients
