= Roncal =

Roncal may refer to:

== Places ==
- Roncal – Erronkari, a town in Navarre in northern Spain
- Roncal Valley, an eponymous valley in Navarre

== People ==
- Mally Roncal (b. 1972), American makeup artist and founder and president of Mally Beauty
- Pedro Roncal (Pedro Roncal Ciriaco, 1962-2018), Spanish journalist

== Other ==
- Roncal cheese, a sheep milk cheese from the Valle de Roncal in Spain

== See also ==
- Rhoncal
- Roncalli (disambiguation)
- Rankle
- RANKL
