= Dan Osborn =

American labor union leader (born 1975)

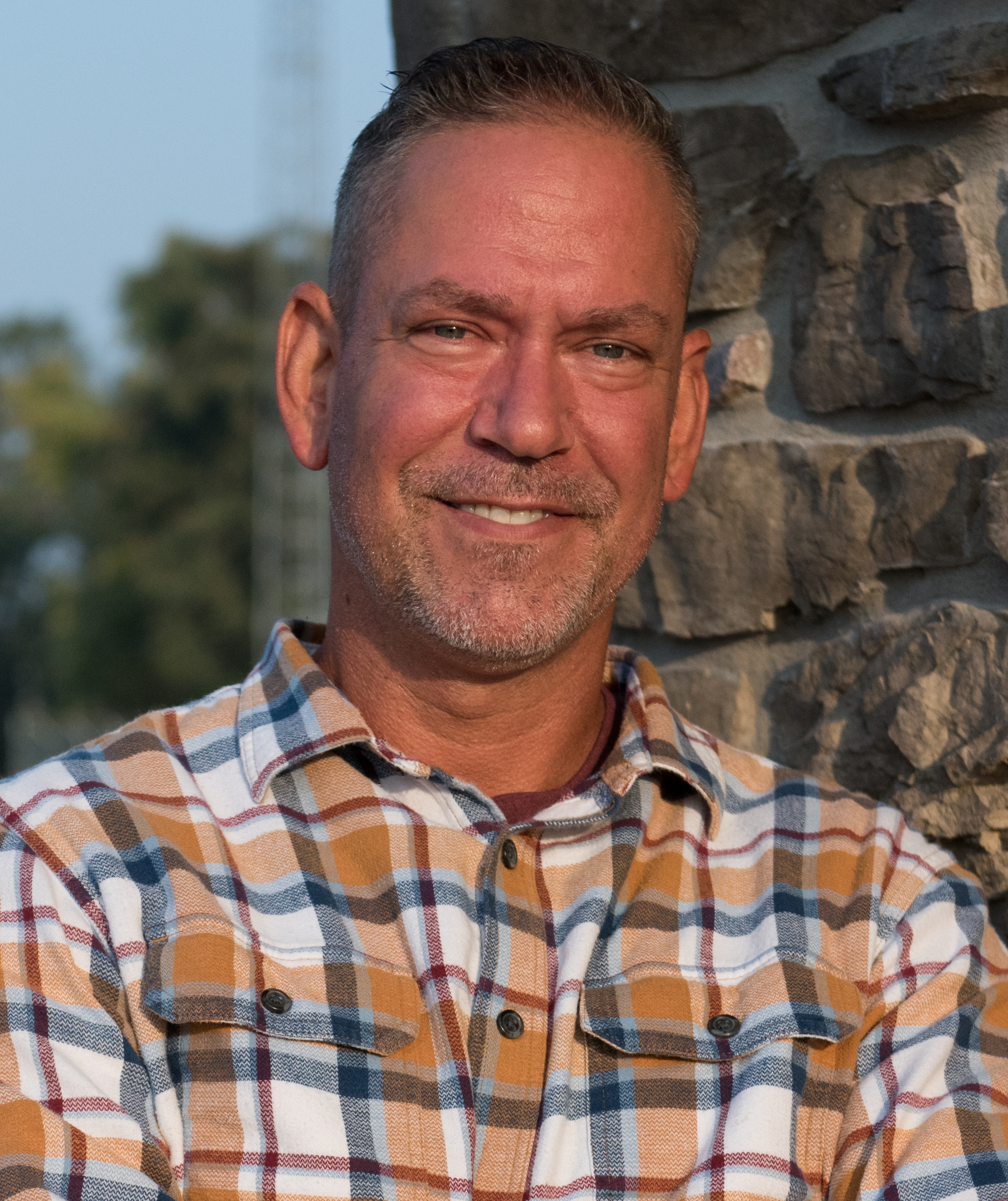
- Osborn in 2023

Personal details
- Born: March 29, 1975 (age 51) Omaha, Nebraska, U.S.
- Party: Independent
- Spouse: Megan Osborn
- Children: 3
- Website: Campaign website

Military service
- Branch/service: United States Navy; Army National Guard
- Unit: USS Constellation (CV-64) (Navy); Nebraska Army National Guard; Tennessee Army National Guard
- Osborn's voice Osborn on affordability in the United States. Recorded November 1, 2024

Daniel L. Osborn (born March 29, 1975) is an American veteran, labor union leader and independent politician from Nebraska. After serving in the United States Navy, Osborn joined the Nebraska Army National Guard.

While working at Kellogg's as an industrial mechanic, he became president of Bakery, Confectionery, Tobacco Workers and Grain Millers International Union Local 50G and led the strike at Kellogg's Omaha plant in 2021. Osborn unsuccessfully ran in the 2024 United States Senate election in Nebraska and drew attention for making what is usually a safe Republican seat unusually competitive.

In 2024, Osborn established the Working Class Heroes Fund, a political action committee (PAC) supporting working-class candidates. In 2025, he formed an exploratory committee for a run in the 2026 United States Senate election in Nebraska. On July 8, 2025, he entered the race as an independent. On November 3, 2026, Osborn lost to incumbent senator Pete Ricketts.

== Early life ==
Dan Osborn was born on March 29, 1975. His mother was a seamstress, and his father, Gary, worked for Union Pacific Railroad, loading cargo; after retiring, he also served as a Republican Dodge County Commissioner.

When Osborn was seven, his family moved to Omaha after his father was transferred with Union Pacific. After an accident, Osborn's father was moved to the railroad company's management side and transferred out of state. Osborn stayed in Omaha to finish high school and lived on his own starting at age 16, paying rent with odd jobs. He graduated from Roncalli Catholic High School in 1994.

== Military career ==
After high school, Osborn enlisted in the United States Navy. He served four years as a storekeeper aboard the aircraft carrier USS Constellation (CV-64), completing two Western Pacific cruises and two Exercise RIMPAC cruises. Osborn later joined the Nebraska Army National Guard. He attended the 19K Tanker school in Idaho and served in the Tennessee Army National Guard.

== Union leader ==
In 2004, Osborn began working as an industrial mechanic at the Kellogg's Omaha plant, fixing the factory's machines. He eventually became president of Bakery, Confectionery, Tobacco Workers and Grain Millers International Union Local 50G. He rose to national prominence when he led the 2021 Kellogg's strike at the plant. The strike, which was prompted by a two-tier system of pay, and included other plants across the country, lasted 77 days. Kellogg's later fired Osborn. He turned to boiler maintenance and repair work at Boys Town and became a member of Steamfitters and Plumbers Local 464.

== U.S. Senate campaigns ==
=== 2024 ===
Both Senate seats in Nebraska were up for reelection in 2024, one in a special election and the other in a regular election. Osborn ran as an independent in the regular election against Deb Fischer, who had no Democratic challenger. Osborn said he could represent working- and middle-class constituencies better than wealthy, establishment politicians.

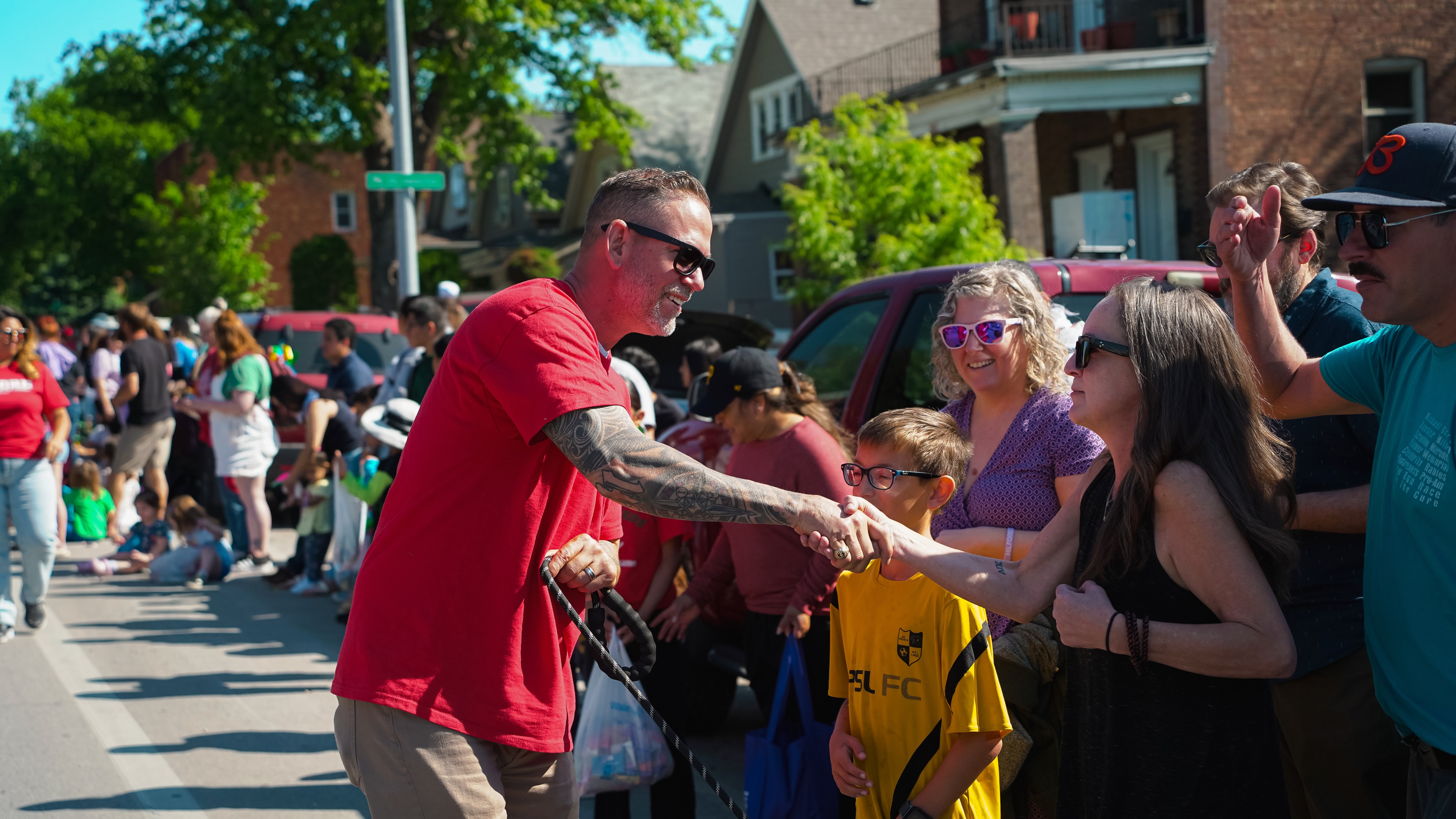
Osborn greeting supporters in Omaha, May 2024

Osborn officially announced his candidacy as an independent candidate on October 5, 2023. By March 2024, he had collected 4,000 signatures from Nebraska voters, enough to be eligible for the November ballot. In August he submitted more than 12,000, guaranteeing his place on the ballot.

Osborn has been registered as nonpartisan since registering to vote in 2004. Although Democrats chose not to run a candidate in the Senate election, Osborn declined their endorsement. The state Democratic Party considered running a write-in candidate, accusing Osborn of misleading them about his intentions, but Osborn said he had always been clear that he would not accept endorsements from any political party. Osborn wanted to form an independent caucus in the Senate rather than caucus with either party. He called the current system a "two-party doom loop." The Reform Party of the United States endorsed him in September 2024. Senate Democrats did not engage with or help Osborn's campaign.

Osborn raised more campaign funds, mostly small-dollar donations, than any independent candidate in Nebraska's history. The last independent to win a Senate seat in Nebraska was progressive George Norris in 1936.

Asked about his prospects in the race by The New York Times, Osborn said: "I've gone up against a major American corporation. I stood up for what I thought was right, and I won." Of the major candidates in the 2024 United States presidential election he said (before Joe Biden withdrew): "I think they're both too old. I think they're both incompetent. There's a good chance I won't vote for president." He later said he intended to vote for one of the two major-party candidates.

The race between Osborn and Fischer, for what is usually a safe Republican Senate seat, was unusually competitive for Nebraska, and potentially important in determining partisan control of the Senate. In an August 2024 SurveyUSA poll sponsored by Split Ticket, Fischer held a narrow lead of 39% to 38% over Osborn, within the margin of error, while 23% of voters were undecided. The poll led the Nebraska Examiner to call the election a tight race. The Cook Political Report's Senate and governor's editor said: "This is probably the most surprising race of the cycle. [Osborn] is such a different type of politician. He's a blue-collar worker—a mechanic. I think Fischer is a lower-profile senator who isn't as well known." Various polls showed both of them leading and the race extremely tight. An October 28 New York Times/Siena College poll showed Osborn two points behind Fischer, well within the margin of error. Fischer won the election, 53% to 47%.

Split Ticket, a data-driven political analysis and forecasting site, wrote that Osborn's performance was the strongest relative to the partisan nature of Senate elections. Politico reported that the Democrats, after their losses in the 2024 elections, were studying Osborn's unusually competitive campaign, especially in a deep red state, as they rebuild their party and its image.

=== 2026 ===
On July 8, 2025, Osborn announced he would run as an independent in the 2026 United States Senate election for the Class II seat held by Republican Pete Ricketts. According to his team, Osborn raised about $2 million in 2025 for his campaign. The Nebraska Democratic Party (NDP), acknowledging that an NDP nominee would have little chance in the general election, chose to clear the field for Osborn. On June 11, 2026, Osborn submitted around 12,500 signatures to Nebraska's Secretary of State, allowing him to appear on the general election ballot as an independent.

The national Democratic Party did not support Osborn's candidacy, but the Nebraska Democratic Party endorsed it. Osborn is unaffiliated, but the state party viewed his candidacy as an opportunity to develop coalitions, disrupt the status quo, and promote a candidate more aligned with its platform. In March 2026, the Reform Party USA endorsed Osborn.

After launching his 2026 campaign, Osborn said he would "welcome donations from anyone, whether you're a Republican, Democrat, Independent, Libertarian, America Party", and said his primary goal if elected was to get big money out of American politics. Of the One Big Beautiful Bill Act and voters, he said: "They were sold a bill of goods that if you work hard in this country, your government is going to be there to have a level playing field for you to get ahead. But now we're seeing tax cuts for the billionaires at the expense of workers, people that are struggling to get by."

It was argued that Osborn was part of a trend in the 2026 elections in which candidates drew on dissatisfaction with the major parties by eschewing the Democrat or Republican label. Osborn's run for the Senate to unseat Ricketts was called a "rugged guy" campaign, referring to his being a man who works with his hands and an appeal to working people who reject both parties.

A New York Times article suggested that Osborn might fare better among Hispanics in the state who were disappointed in the immigration policy of the second Trump administration and its effects on the Latino community. Newsweek wrote that while the political climate was more favorable to Osborn, there were significantly more registered Republicans in Nebraska than all other parties and unaffiliated voters combined, making his an uphill battle.

Osborn said he would not caucus with either of the two major parties if elected, and said: "I'm going to caucus with everybody." Brian Bengs, the independent Senate candidate from South Dakota, said he would caucus with Osborn and form an independent caucus.

In September, Nebraska Values PAC, which supported Osborn, ran an ad about a convicted rapist Ricketts voted to pardon while governor, calling Ricketts out of touch with Nebraskans.

Osborn's campaign highlighted economic inequality, especially income disparity. In advertisements and social media, he characterized Ricketts as a spoiled rich kid whose Senate seat was bought by his father, the founder of Ameritrade. Osborn said: "The system's working exactly like it's designed to work—for them" and "Nebraska has to make this decision and tell the rest of the country we're not for sale".

== Political positions ==
Osborn's political positions are populist, with an emphasis on protecting small businesses, family farmers, and workers. He has expressed support for capitalism and private ownership while opposing monopolies through restrictions on AI development and data centers, raising the federal minimum wage, lowering tax rates for small businesses and overtime work, and facilitating union organizing. He favors gun rights and the Second Amendment, tighter immigration policy, and opposes the 2026 Iran war, calling it a "forever war" promoted by elites.

=== AI and data centers ===
Osborn is a critic of AI data centers, calling them an instance of the powerful plotting to undermine the contributions of everyday people. He opposes the development of superintelligence and artificial general intelligence.

=== Economic and labor policy ===
Osborn has supported raising the federal minimum wage, lowering tax rates for small businesses and overtime work, and facilitating union organizing. He has also supported the right to repair consumer goods, including automobiles and electronics. He has advocated increasing the income cap subject to Social Security payroll taxes and returning the full retirement age for Social Security benefits to 65.

=== Trade ===
Osborn has supported policies intended to protect workers and industries from what he considers unfair trade practices. He has criticized free trade agreements that he argues have contributed to the outsourcing of American jobs and supported measures to encourage domestic manufacturing. Osborn has also called for trade policies that prioritize American workers and small businesses while maintaining access to international markets.

=== Immigration ===
Osborn has supported increased border security and construction of additional sections of the Mexico–United States border wall. He has also called for immigration reform and said he was open to legalizing some long-term undocumented immigrants who have no criminal record.

=== Law enforcement and public safety ===
Osborn has supported ensuring adequate resources for law enforcement officers and first responders. He has also supported measures intended to improve railroad safety, having been a labor organizer in the railroad industry.

=== Veterans ===
Osborn is a veteran of the United States Navy and the Nebraska Army National Guard. He has advocated increased funding for the Department of Veterans Affairs and policies intended to improve access to health care and benefits for veterans. During his 2024 campaign, he called for fully funding the VA to address claims backlogs and supported comprehensive job placement and job-training programs for veterans.

During his 2026 campaign, Osborn supported the Major Richard Star Act, which would eliminate the offset between military retirement pay and VA disability compensation for certain medically retired veterans. He has also opposed privatization of the VA, arguing that veterans should receive health care through a strengthened VA system rather than increased reliance on private providers.

=== Campaign finance ===
Osborn has advocated campaign finance reform in the United States and criticized the influence of PACs, Super PACs, and undisclosed political spending in federal elections. He has called for overturning Citizens United v. Federal Election Commission and reducing the influence of what he calls "dark money" in politics.

During the 2026 campaign, Osborn said that his campaign was primarily supported by individual donors and stated that he did not coordinate directly with outside groups making independent expenditures on his behalf. Federal Election Commission records show that his authorized committees reported approximately $5.75 million in receipts through June 30, 2026, including approximately $5.54 million in individual contributions.

=== Housing ===
Osborn has supported policies intended to increase the supply of affordable housing and increasing opportunities for working- and middle-class families to purchase homes. He has argued that housing costs are affected by availability and supported efforts to reduce barriers to housing construction. His housing-related positions have included support for expanding the supply of affordable homes and for measures intended to assist renters and homeowners facing rising housing costs. His broader economic platform has emphasized reducing costs for working families and increasing economic security, which he has linked to the ability to afford housing. Osborn has emphasized increasing housing supply rather than relying solely on government subsidies. He has expressed support for policies that encourage construction of additional housing, including affordable and workforce housing, while seeking to reduce regulatory barriers that can increase the cost of development.

=== LGBTQ rights ===
Osborn has supported legal recognition of same-sex marriage and has stated that he opposes discrimination on the basis of sexual orientation. During the 2024 Senate campaign, he said that people's private lives were "no business but their own" and expressed support for protecting same-sex marriage.

Osborn has generally described his approach to social issues as emphasizing individual freedom and limited government involvement in private life. His stated position on LGBTQ rights has been reported as supporting protections for same-sex couples and opposing discrimination.

=== Cannabis ===
Osborn has supported legalizing and taxing marijuana.

=== Abortion ===
Osborn is personally pro-life, while supporting legal access to abortion under the framework established by Roe v. Wade and opposing a federal abortion ban. He has said that he supports a woman's ability to make decisions about her own body while opposing late-term abortion. Osborn has characterized his position on abortion and other socially divisive issues as a "libertarian approach", arguing that the government should have a limited role in citizens' private lives.

=== Gun policy ===
Osborn has supported gun rights and the Second Amendment, while also supporting gun safety education in schools.

=== Foreign policy ===
Osborn has supported providing Israel with funding for what he described as "defensive purpose only".

In 2026, Osborn criticized the US–Israeli war on Iran, questioning the rationale for the military operation. He said, "This is crazy and I just don't think we need to keep getting into forever wars."

== Personal life ==
Osborn lives in Omaha, Nebraska, with his wife, Megan; they have three children. He is Catholic.

== Electoral history ==
=== 2024 ===
2024 United States Senate election in Nebraska
Party	Candidate	Votes	%	±%
Republican	Deb Fischer (incumbent)	499,124	53.19%	−4.50%
Independent	Dan Osborn	436,493	46.52%	—
Write-in		2,719	0.29%	+0.22
Majority		62,631	6.67%	−12.39%
Total votes		938,336	100.00%	
Republican hold				

== See also ==
- List of third-party and independent performances in United States Senate elections
