= Roncalli =

Roncalli may refer to:

- Circus Roncalli, German circus
- Roncalli (TV series), Germany television series

== Schools ==
- Roncalli High School (disambiguation), list of schools with the name
- Roncalli Catholic High School, school in Omaha, Nebraska
- Roncalli College, a secondary school in Timaru, New Zealand,

== Family name ==
- Cristoforo Roncalli (c. 1552–1626), Italian painter
- Ludovico Roncalli (1654–1713), Italian composer
- Angelo Giuseppe Roncalli, Italian prelate, Pope John XXIII (1881–1963)
