= Pilar García Muñiz =

Spanish actress (born 1974)

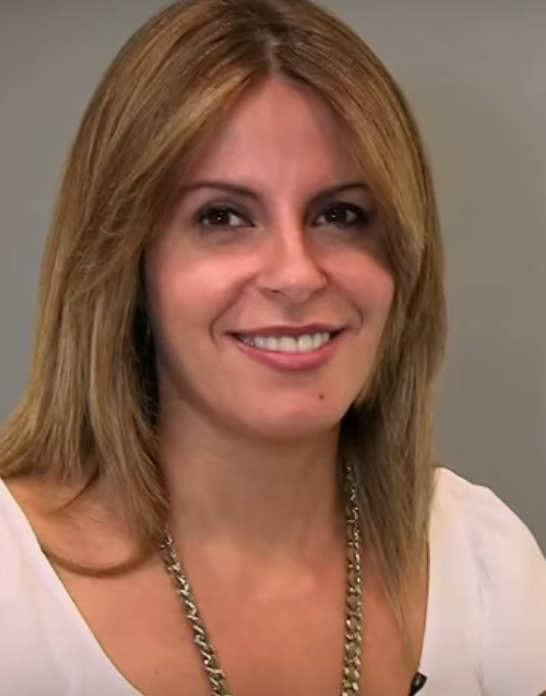
- Pilar García Muñiz in 2013
- Born: María Pilar García Muñiz; 21 March 1974 (age 52); Madrid, Spain
- Occupation: Journalist
- Employers: Canal 7 (1996-1998); Vía digital (1998-1999); TVE (1999-2019); COPE (2019-present)
- Spouse: Pedro Roncal

María Pilar García Muñiz (Madrid, March 21, 1974) is a Spanish journalist.

== Career path ==
She holds a degree in Information Sciences, branch of Journalism, from the Complutense University of Madrid. She started working in the world of journalism in 1992, at the same time she was beginning her studies at the faculty. She collaborated in different local media until 1996, when she joined Canal 7, where she worked as editor and presenter of different entertainment programs.

Later, in 1998, she joined Red 2000, a Via Digital channel dedicated to new technologies. There she worked as a presenter and editor.

Her first contact with TVE was in 1999 when she joined Canal 24 horas, where she worked as a news anchor. In May 2003, she presented the news previews of the municipal and regional elections. In October 2003 she became part of the Society area of TVE's, in the group of reporters and special envoys.

Between January 16, 2004 and September 12, 2004, she presented the Telediario Fin de Semana, on Saturdays and Sundays from 3 to 4 pm and from 9 to 10 pm, together with José Ribagorda and Sergio Sauca.

In 2003 and 2004 she presented Informe semanal, on Saturdays from 9.30 to 10.45 pm during the summer season, replacing Baltasar Magro.

Between 2004 and 2005 she worked in the Society area of TVE's News Services, as part of the team of reporters and special envoys, where she covered the 2004 Indian Ocean Earthquake and the death of Pope John Paul II in 2005.

From July 6, 2005, she hosted the daily news program España directo, from Monday to Friday from 6 to 8 pm, until its end on June 30, 2011, after 1,749 programs, she said: "After 6 years I would tell you many things. We have shared with all of you current affairs but also hundreds of stories that have interested us, surprised us, amused us and, moreover, moved us. Thank you for joining us. We have always said goodbye with the best of smiles, today too, and also wishing you all the best of happiness".

Between 2009 and 2012 she presented first with Javier Solano (in 2009) and later with Patxi Cervantes (between 2010 and 2012), the San Fermín specials on TVE, the Chupinazo and the running of the bulls, every day between July 6 and 14, between 7.15 and 8.30, live from Pamplona.

From September 12, 2011 to June 29, 2012, she was in charge of the daily version of the program +Gente, from Monday to Friday from 7 pm to 9 pm, along with José Ángel Leiras. From September 20, 2012 until July 4, 2013, on Thursdays at midnight, she took over the political talk show El debate on La 1, replacing María Casado, combining it with the conduction of La mañana en 24 horas from September 17, 2012 to July 5, 2013, from Monday to Friday from 10.15 to 14, on Canal 24 horas, and replaced Ana Blanco when she was not in charge of Telediario 1. From August 12, 2013 to August 17, 2018, she was in charge of presenting Telediario 1 from Monday to Friday, from 15 to 16, with Sergio Sauca in sports.

At this stage, she presented news specials on the occasion of the 2014 European Parliament Elections and the 2015 Andalusian Parliament Elections.

On September 1, 2018, it was confirmed that she would no longer present Telediario 1 and would return to present Informe semanal on Saturdays from 9:30 pm to 10:00 pm, from September 15, 2018 to July 13, 2019.

On April 22, 2019, she presented with Íñigo Alfonso the special pre and post RTVE debate.

On July 11, 2019, it was announced that she was leaving TVE to join the program Herrera en COPE in the section from 06h00 to 10h00 and also to be a substitute for Carlos Herrera during his absences, from September 2, 2019 to July 23, 2021.
