= 2026 United States Senate election in South Dakota =

- November 3, 2026
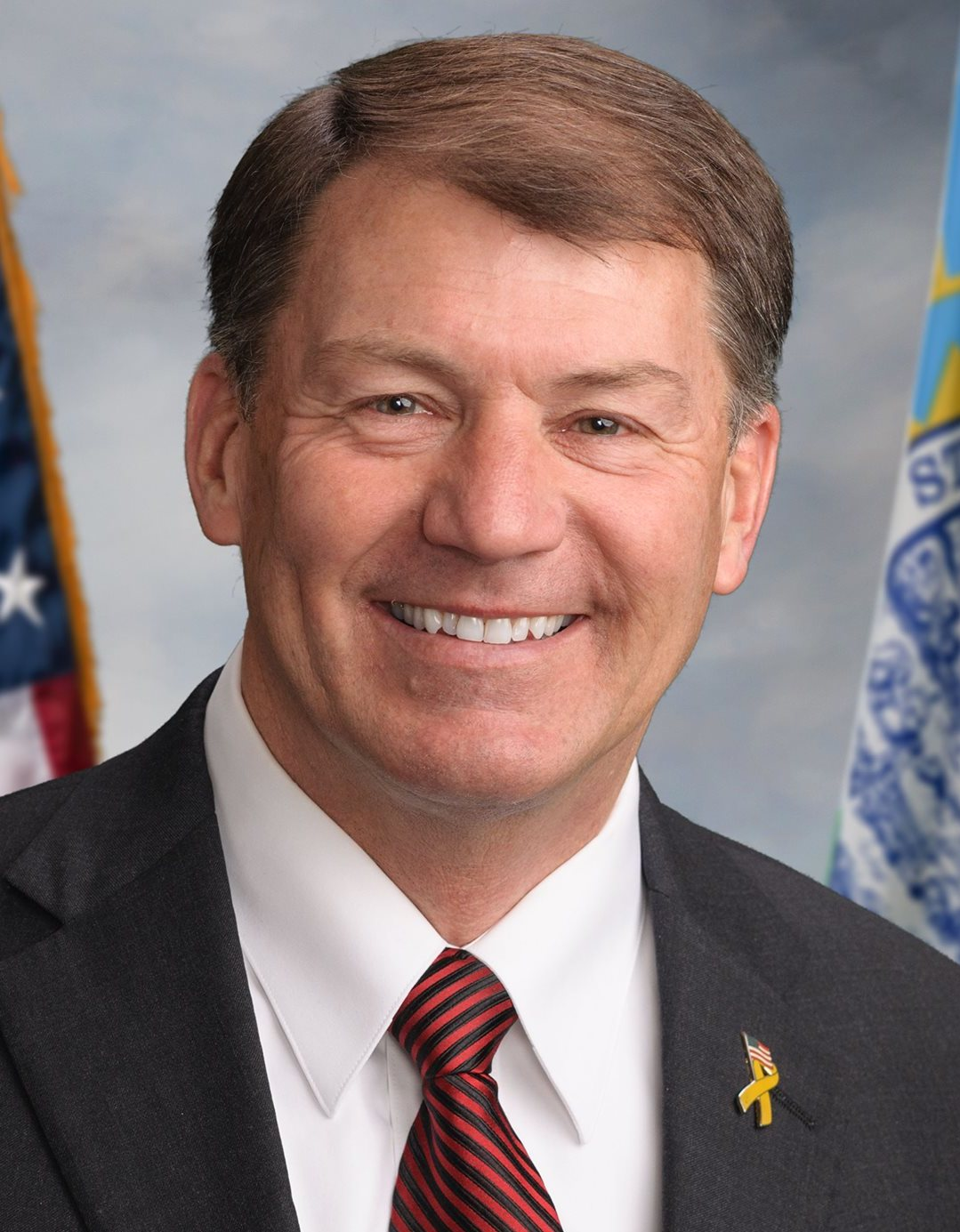

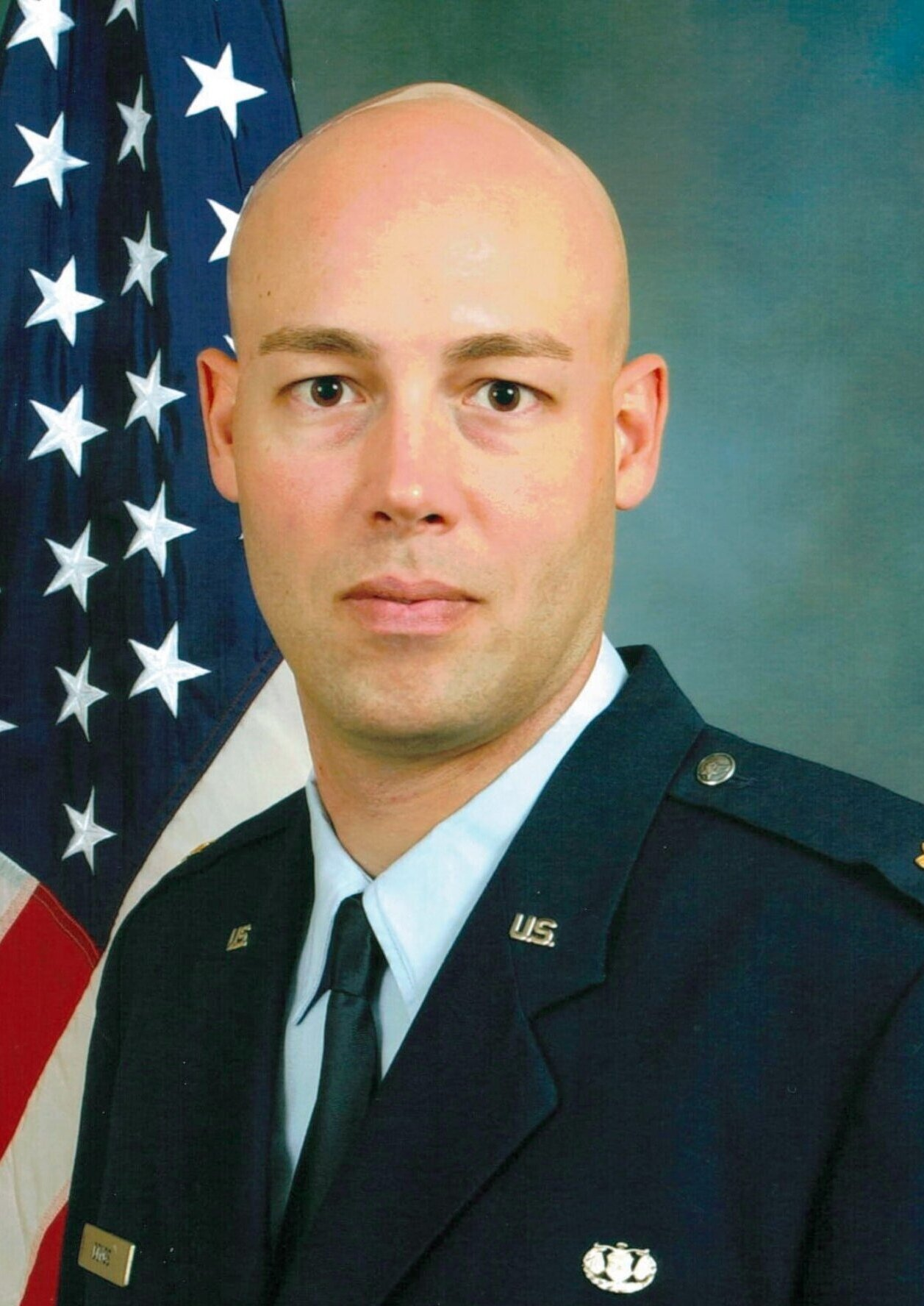
| Nominee | Mike Rounds | Brian Bengs |
| Party | Republican | Independent |
| Popular vote | 184,590 | 120,513 |
| Percentage | 60.50% | 39.50% |
- County results Rounds: 50–60% 60–70% 70–80% 80–90% Bengs: 50–60% 60–70% 70–80% 80–90%
U.S. senator before election
Mike Rounds
Republican
Elected U.S. senator
Mike Rounds
Republican

The 2026 United States Senate election in South Dakota was held on November 3, 2026, to elect a member of the United States Senate to represent the state of South Dakota. Republican incumbent Mike Rounds was re-elected to a third term, defeating independent retired Air Force officer Brian Bengs.

Primary elections were held on June 2. Rounds received 75.8% of the vote against minimal opposition. Former state trooper Julian Beaudion won the Democratic nomination unopposed, but withdrew from the race on August 4. Bengs, the Democratic nominee in 2022, filed to run as an independent.

== Background ==
South Dakota is considered a red state. As of October 2026 voter registration was 331,873 Republican, 157,608 indepedent/non-affiliated, 135,324 Democratic, and 2,796 Libertarian. Democrats have not won a Senate race or statewide election in South Dakota since Tim Johnson was re-elected in 2008. The last time an independent was elected to South Dakota's Senate seat was in 1891.

The state was one of three (along with Nebraska and Idaho) in 2026 Senate election cycle where the Democratic nominee withdrew from the race, effectively clearing the field for an independent.

== Republican primary ==
=== Candidates ===
==== Nominee ====
- Mike Rounds, incumbent U.S. senator (2015–present)

==== Eliminated in primary ====
- Justin McNeal, Navy veteran and businessman

=== Endorsements ===
Mike Rounds

Executive branch officials

- Donald Trump, president of the United States (2017–2021, 2025–present)

Organizations

- AIPAC

=== Fundraising ===
Campaign finance reports as of March 31, 2026
| Candidate | Raised | Spent | Cash on hand |
|---|---|---|---|
| Justin McNeal (R) | $1,555 | $11 | $1,543 |
| Mike Rounds (R) | $3,769,823 | $2,515,470 | $2,936,874 |
Source: Federal Election Commission

=== Polling ===
| Poll source | Date(s) administered | Sample size (Note: Key: A – all adults RV – registered voters LV – likely voters V – unclear) | Margin of error | Mike Rounds | Justin McNeal | Undecided |
|---|---|---|---|---|---|---|
| Mason-Dixon Polling & Strategy (Note: Poll sponsored by South Dakota News Watch and the Chiesman Center for Democracy at the University of South Dakota) | April 7–11, 2026 | 500 (RV) | ± 4.5% | 66% | 18% | 20% |

Hypothetical polling

Mike Rounds vs. Kristi Noem

| Poll source | Date(s) administered | Sample size | Margin of error | Mike Rounds | Kristi Noem | Undecided |
|---|---|---|---|---|---|---|
| Kaplan Strategies | June 12, 2023 | 500 (RV) | ± 4.7% | 26% | 53% | 21% |

Kristi Noem vs. Dusty Johnson

| Poll source | Date(s) administered | Sample size | Margin of error | Kristi Noem | Dusty Johnson | Undecided |
|---|---|---|---|---|---|---|
| Kaplan Strategies | June 12, 2023 | 500 (RV) | ± 4.7% | 54% | 23% | 23% |

=== Results ===
Primary results by county: Rounds: 60–70%; 70–80%; 80–90%

Republican primary results
| Party | Candidate | Votes | % |
|---|---|---|---|
| Republican | Mike Rounds (incumbent) | 101,284 | 75.8 |
| Republican | Justin McNeal | 32,341 | 24.2 |
| Total votes | | 133,625 | 100.0 |

== Independent ==
=== Candidate ===
==== Declared ====
- Brian Bengs, U.S. Navy and Air Force veteran, former Northern State University political science professor, and Democratic nominee for U.S. Senate in 2022 (Ballot place confirmed by Secretary of State of South Dakota on April 28, 2026)

=== Fundraising ===
Campaign finance reports as of March 31, 2026
| Candidate | Raised | Spent | Cash on hand |
|---|---|---|---|
| Brian Bengs (I) | $564,715 | $511,174 | $53,540 |
Source: Federal Election Commission

== Democratic primary ==
=== Candidates ===
==== Withdrew after nomination ====
- Julian Beaudion, former South Dakota state trooper, activist, and businessman

=== Fundraising ===
Campaign finance reports as of March 31, 2026
| Candidate | Raised | Spent | Cash on hand |
|---|---|---|---|
| Julian Beaudion (D) | $192,473 | $185,994 | $6,478 |
Source: Federal Election Commission

== General election ==
=== Predictions ===
| Source | Ranking | As of |
|---|---|---|
| The Cook Political Report | Solid R | November 2, 2026 |
| Decision Desk HQ | Safe R | November 3, 2026 |
| The Economist (Note: The Economist's prediction model uses unconventional terminology. For the purpose of equivalency, their "Very Likely" ratings are formatted as a "Likely" rating while "Likely" ratings are formatted as a "Lean" rating.) | Safe R | November 3, 2026 |
| FiftyPlusOne | Safe R | November 3, 2026 |
| Fox News | Solid R | November 1, 2026 |
| Inside Elections | Solid R | October 29, 2026 |
| MS NOW | Safe R | October 29, 2026 |
| NBC News | Solid R | November 3, 2026 |
| RealClearPolitics | Solid R | November 2, 2026 |
| Sabato's Crystal Ball | Safe R | November 2, 2026 |
| Silver Bulletin | Solid R | November 3, 2026 |
| Split Ticket | Likely R | November 2, 2026 |

=== Post-primary endorsements ===
Mike Rounds (R)

Organizations

- NRA Political Victory Fund

Newspapers

- Mitchell Daily Republic
Brian Bengs (I)

Executive branch officials

- Christine Todd Whitman, former Administrator of the Environmental Protection Agency (2001–2003), former Governor of New Jersey (1994–2001), and co-chair of the Forward Party (2022–present) (Forward; elected as a Republican)

Party officials

- Andrew Yang, co-chair of the Forward Party (2022–present) (Forward)

Political parties

- Forward Party

Labor unions

- AFSCME Council 65

Interest groups

- Change Agents of South Dakota
- Independent Veterans of America
Julian Beaudion (D) (withdrawn)

Executive branch officials

- Joe Biden, former president of the United States (2021–2025)

=== Fundraising ===
Italics indicate a withdrawn candidate

Campaign finance reports as of October 14, 2026
| Candidate | Raised | Spent | Cash on hand |
|---|---|---|---|
| Mike Rounds (R) | $5,148,217 | $5,535,196 | $1,295,543 |
| Julian Beaudion (D) | $247,595 | $246,900 | $695 |
| Brian Bengs (I) | $1,855,763 | $1,786,055 | $69,708 |
Source: Federal Election Commission

=== Polling ===
Aggregate polls

| Source of poll aggregation | Dates administered | Dates updated | Mike Rounds (R) | Brian Bengs (I) | Other/ Undecided (Note: Calculated by taking the difference of 100% and all other candidates combined.) | Margin |
|---|---|---|---|---|---|---|
| Decision Desk HQ | through October 26, 2026 | October 30, 2026 | 49.7% | 39.5% | 10.8% | Rounds +10.2% |
| FiftyPlusOne | through October 26, 2026 | November 3, 2026 | 51.3% | 41.3% | 7.4% | Rounds +10.0% |
| Silver Bulletin | through October 26, 2026 | November 3, 2026 | 52.4% | 41.7% | 5.9% | Rounds +10.7% |
| Average | | | 51.1% | 40.8% | 8.1% | Rounds +10.3% |

| Poll source | Date(s) administered | Sample size | Margin of error | Mike Rounds (R) | Brian Bengs (I) | Other | Undecided |
|---|---|---|---|---|---|---|---|
| Concord Public Opinion Partners (D) (Note: Poll sponsored by Democrats for Education Reform) | October 22–26, 2026 | 448 (LV) | ± 3.5% | 41% | 43% | 9% (Note: "Someone else" with 9%) | 6% |
| Emerson College | October 19–20, 2026 | 803 (LV) | ± 3.5% | 50% | 42% | — | 8% |
| Quantus Insights (R) | October 17–19, 2026 | 633 (LV) | ± 4.1% | 59% (Note: Leaners pushed) | 37% | 2% (Note: "Someone else" with 2%) | 2% |
| Quantus Insights (R) | October 17–19, 2026 | 633 (LV) | ± 4.1% | 57% | 37% | 2% (Note: "Someone else" with 2%) | 5% |
| Public Opinon Strategies (R) (Note: Poll sponsored by Rounds' campaign) | October 12–16, 2026 | 500 (LV) | ± 4.4% | 54% | 37% | 9% | |
| Mason-Dixon Polling & Strategy (Note: Poll conducted for South Dakota News Watch and the University of South Dakota) | October 12–14, 2026 | 500 (RV) | ± 4.5% | 56% | 37% | – | 6% |
| Concord Public Opinion Partners (D) | October 6–8, 2026 | 400 (LV) | ± 4.9% | 42% | 43% | 5% | 10% |
| Zenith Research (Note: Poll sponsored by Bengs' campaign) | September 24–27, 2026 | 500 (LV) | ± 4.4% | 53% (Note: With voters who lean toward a given candidate) | 47% | — | — |
| Zenith Research | September 24–27, 2026 | 500 (LV) | ± 4.4% | 44% | 38% | — | 17% |
| Public Policy Polling (D) | September 8–9, 2026 | 629 (RV) | ± 3.6% | 45% | 42% | — | 13% |
| Lake Research Partners (D) | August 26–30, 2026 | 500 (LV) | ± 4.4% | 44% | 51% | — | 5% |
| Impact Research (D) | August 13–17, 2026 | 500 (LV) | ± 4.4% | 44% | 44% | — | 12% |
| Public Opinion Strategies (R) (Note: Poll sponsored by the NRSC) | July 6–9, 2026 | 500 (LV) | ± 4.4% | 56% | 33% | — | 11% |
| | June 2, 2026 | Primary elections | | | | | |
| Public Policy Polling (D) | May 29–30, 2026 | 726 (RV) | ± 3.6% | 44% | 40% | — | 16% |
| Public Policy Polling (D) | February 17–18, 2026 | 685 (RV) | — | 47% | 35% | — | 19% |
| Public Policy Polling (D) | November 13–14, 2025 | 814 (RV) | ± 3.3% | 44% | 31% | — | 25% |
| Public Policy Polling (D) | July 30–31, 2025 | 524 (LV) | ± 4.1% | 41% | 28% | — | 31% |

Hypothetical polling

Mike Rounds vs. Julian Beaudion vs. Brian Bengs

| Poll source | Date(s) administered | Sample size | Margin of error | Mike Rounds (R) | Julian Beaudion (D) | Brian Bengs (I) | Undecided |
|---|---|---|---|---|---|---|---|
| Public Policy Polling (D) | May 29–30, 2026 | 726 (RV) | ± 3.6% | 43% | 18% | 23% | 16% |

Mike Rounds vs. Julian Beaudion

| Poll source | Date(s) administered | Sample size | Margin of error | Mike Rounds (R) | Julian Beaudion (D) | Undecided |
|---|---|---|---|---|---|---|
| Public Policy Polling (D) | May 29–30, 2026 | 726 (RV) | ± 3.6% | 56% | 31% | 13% |
| Public Policy Polling (D) | February 17–18, 2026 | 685 (RV) | ± - | 49% | 32% | 19% |
| Public Policy Polling (D) | November 13–14, 2025 | 814 (RV) | ± 3.3% | 52% | 30% | 18% |

=== Results ===
2026 United States Senate election in South Dakota
| Party | Candidate | Votes | % |
|---|---|---|---|
| Republican | Mike Rounds (incumbent) | 184,590 | 60.50 |
| Independent | Brian Bengs | 120,513 | 39.50 |
| Total votes | | 305,103 | 100.00 |
| Republican hold | | | |

==== By county ====
| County | Mike Rounds Republican | | Brian Bengs Independent | | Margin | | Total |
| County | # | % | # | % | # | % | Total |
|---|---|---|---|---|---|---|---|
| Aurora | 679 | 70.14% | 289 | 29.86% | 390 | 40.29% | 968 |
| Beadle | 3,282 | 68.38% | 1,518 | 31.63% | 1,764 | 36.75% | 4,800 |
| Bennett | 500 | 59.95% | 334 | 40.05% | 166 | 19.90% | 834 |
| Bon Homme | 1,540 | 71.79% | 605 | 28.21% | 935 | 43.59% | 2,145 |
| Brookings | 6,408 | 56.01% | 5,033 | 43.99% | 1,375 | 12.02% | 11,441 |
| Brown | 7,277 | 60.59% | 4,734 | 39.41% | 2,543 | 21.17% | 12,011 |
| Brule | 1,211 | 68.38% | 560 | 31.62% | 651 | 36.76% | 1,771 |
| Buffalo | 142 | 39.01% | 222 | 60.99% | -80 | -21.98% | 364 |
| Butte | 2,524 | 73.54% | 908 | 26.46% | 1,616 | 47.09% | 3,432 |
| Campbell | 488 | 81.20% | 113 | 18.80% | 375 | 62.40% | 601 |
| Charles Mix | 1,838 | 69.12% | 821 | 30.88% | 1,017 | 38.25% | 2,659 |
| Clark | 1,170 | 76.32% | 363 | 23.68% | 807 | 52.64% | 1,533 |
| Clay | 1,770 | 43.73% | 2,278 | 56.27% | -508 | -12.55% | 4,048 |
| Codington | 6,421 | 65.04% | 3,452 | 34.96% | 2,969 | 30.07% | 9,873 |
| Corson | 395 | 55.63% | 315 | 44.37% | 80 | 11.27% | 710 |
| Custer | 3,149 | 67.63% | 1,507 | 32.37% | 1,642 | 35.27% | 4,656 |
| Davison | 4,014 | 66.45% | 2,027 | 33.55% | 1,987 | 32.89% | 6,041 |
| Day | 1,389 | 61.87% | 856 | 38.13% | 533 | 23.74% | 2,245 |
| Deuel | 1,187 | 70.36% | 500 | 29.64% | 687 | 40.72% | 1,687 |
| Dewey | 579 | 46.17% | 675 | 53.83% | -96 | -7.66% | 1,254 |
| Douglas | 1,084 | 86.10% | 175 | 13.90% | 909 | 72.20% | 1,259 |
| Edmunds | 1,088 | 75.56% | 352 | 24.44% | 736 | 51.11% | 1,440 |
| Fall River | 2,218 | 67.87% | 1,050 | 32.13% | 1,168 | 35.74% | 3,268 |
| Faulk | 658 | 80.74% | 157 | 19.26% | 501 | 61.47% | 815 |
| Grant | 2,043 | 70.42% | 858 | 29.58% | 1,185 | 40.85% | 2,901 |
| Gregory | 1,186 | 75.49% | 385 | 24.51% | 801 | 50.99% | 1,571 |
| Haakon | 711 | 85.05% | 125 | 14.95% | 586 | 70.10% | 836 |
| Hamlin | 1,658 | 74.32% | 573 | 25.68% | 1,085 | 48.63% | 2,231 |
| Hand | 989 | 78.06% | 278 | 21.94% | 711 | 56.12% | 1,267 |
| Hanson | 887 | 75.11% | 294 | 24.89% | 593 | 50.21% | 1,181 |
| Harding | 567 | 86.30% | 90 | 13.70% | 477 | 72.60% | 657 |
| Hughes | 4,267 | 66.11% | 2,187 | 33.89% | 2,080 | 32.23% | 6,454 |
| Hutchinson | 1,957 | 76.59% | 598 | 23.41% | 1,359 | 53.19% | 2,555 |
| Hyde | 397 | 78.46% | 109 | 21.54% | 288 | 56.92% | 506 |
| Jackson | 510 | 66.15% | 261 | 33.85% | 249 | 32.30% | 771 |
| Jerauld | 489 | 70.46% | 205 | 29.54% | 284 | 40.92% | 694 |
| Jones | 380 | 83.52% | 75 | 16.48% | 305 | 67.03% | 455 |
| Kingsbury | 1,421 | 69.28% | 630 | 30.72% | 791 | 38.57% | 2,051 |
| Lake | 2,831 | 63.96% | 1,595 | 36.04% | 1,236 | 27.93% | 4,426 |
| Lawrence | 6,460 | 59.51% | 4,396 | 40.49% | 2,064 | 19.01% | 10,856 |
| Lincoln | 15,387 | 58.61% | 10,866 | 41.39% | 4,521 | 17.22% | 26,253 |
| Lyman | 729 | 64.80% | 396 | 35.20% | 333 | 29.60% | 1,125 |
| Marshall | 1,007 | 60.85% | 648 | 39.15% | 359 | 21.69% | 1,655 |
| McCook | 1,555 | 71.92% | 607 | 28.08% | 948 | 43.85% | 2,162 |
| McPherson | 816 | 82.26% | 176 | 17.74% | 640 | 64.52% | 992 |
| Meade | 6,916 | 69.14% | 3,087 | 30.86% | 3,829 | 38.28% | 10,003 |
| Mellette | 372 | 61.39% | 234 | 38.61% | 138 | 22.77% | 606 |
| Miner | 622 | 70.36% | 262 | 29.64% | 360 | 40.72% | 884 |
| Minnehaha | 34,362 | 51.57% | 32,272 | 48.43% | 2,090 | 3.14% | 66,634 |
| Moody | 1,518 | 61.93% | 933 | 38.07% | 585 | 23.87% | 2,451 |
| Oglala Lakota | 336 | 15.62% | 1,815 | 84.38% | -1,479 | -68.76% | 2,151 |
| Pennington | 21,843 | 57.16% | 16,373 | 42.84% | 5,470 | 14.31% | 38,216 |
| Perkins | 985 | 77.87% | 280 | 22.13% | 705 | 55.73% | 1,265 |
| Potter | 745 | 80.63% | 179 | 19.37% | 566 | 61.26% | 924 |
| Roberts | 1,730 | 58.51% | 1,227 | 41.49% | 503 | 17.01% | 2,957 |
| Sanborn | 585 | 70.74% | 242 | 29.26% | 343 | 41.48% | 827 |
| Spink | 1,539 | 68.19% | 718 | 31.81% | 821 | 36.38% | 2,257 |
| Stanley | 981 | 74.04% | 344 | 25.96% | 637 | 48.08% | 1,325 |
| Sully | 575 | 80.76% | 137 | 19.24% | 438 | 61.52% | 712 |
| Todd | 404 | 25.16% | 1,202 | 74.84% | -798 | -49.69% | 1,606 |
| Tripp | 1,541 | 79.72% | 392 | 20.28% | 1,149 | 59.44% | 1,933 |
| Turner | 2,344 | 72.30% | 898 | 27.70% | 1,446 | 44.60% | 3,242 |
| Union | 3,862 | 67.00% | 1,902 | 33.00% | 1,960 | 34.00% | 5,764 |
| Walworth | 1,272 | 77.56% | 368 | 22.44% | 904 | 55.12% | 1,640 |
| Yankton | 4,500 | 58.56% | 3,185 | 41.44% | 1,315 | 17.11% | 7,685 |
| Ziebach | 300 | 52.91% | 267 | 47.09% | 33 | 5.82% | 567 |
| Totals | 184,590 | 60.50% | 120,513 | 39.50% | 64,077 | 21.00% | 305,103 |
