= Roncalli High School =

Roncalli High School may refer to:

- Roncalli High School (Indiana), school in Indianapolis, Indiana
- Roncalli High School (South Dakota), school in Aberdeen, South Dakota
- Roncalli High School (Wisconsin), school in Manitowoc, Wisconsin

== See also ==
- Roncalli Catholic High School, school in Omaha, Nebraska
