= Pedro Roncal =

Spanish journalist, teacher, and news channel director (1962–2018)

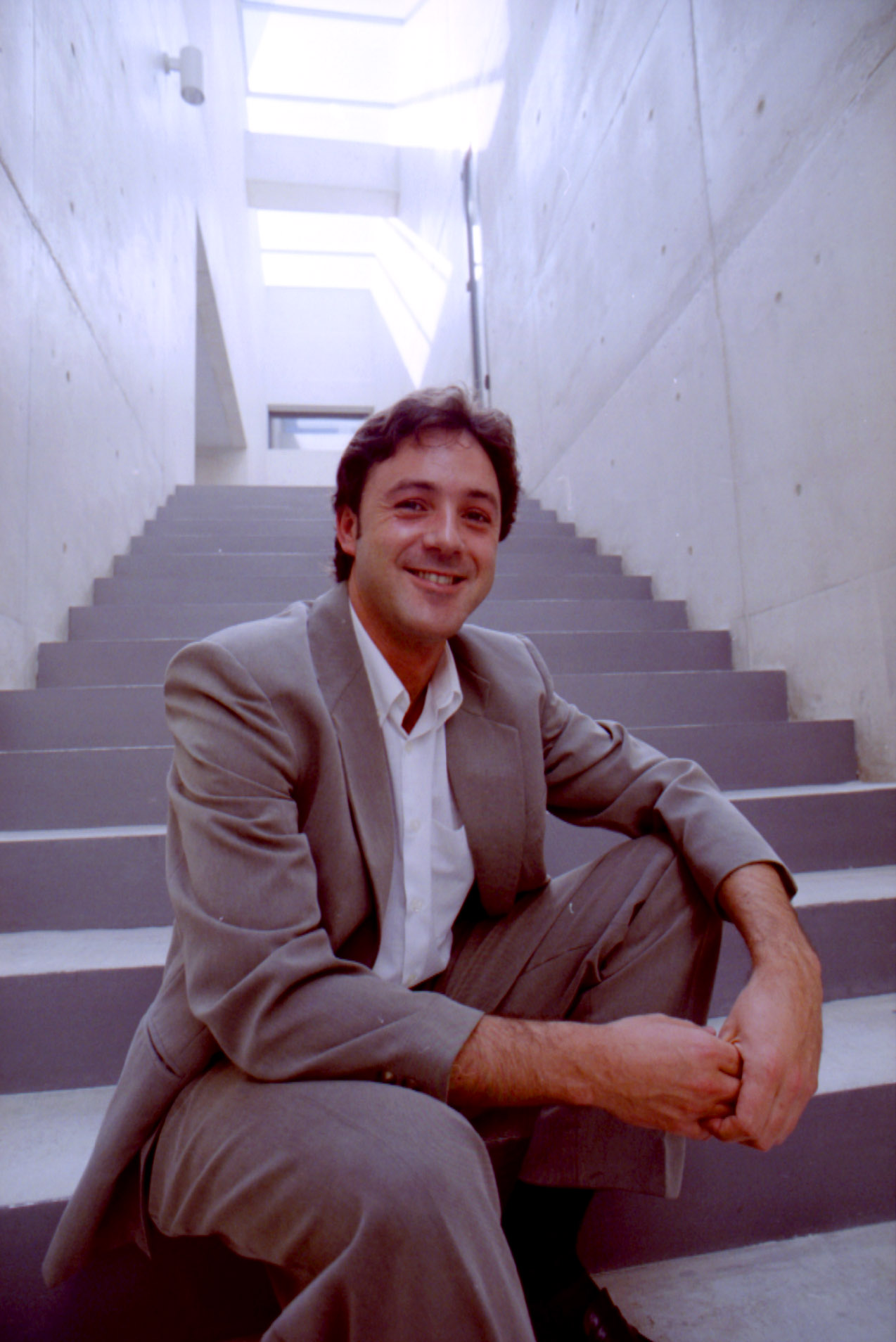
- Born: September 23, 1962; Pamplona, Spain
- Died: August 19, 2018 (aged 55); Pamplona, Spain
- Education: University of Navarra
- Occupation: Journalist
- Spouse: Pilar García Muñiz
- Children: 1

Pedro Guillermo Roncal Ciriaco (23 September 1962 – 19 August 2018) was a Spanish journalist, teacher, director of the all-news Radio 5 RNE and 24 Horas channels of public broadcaster RTVE, and a professor at RTVE's Official Institute.

== Journalism career ==
Roncal graduated in Information Sciences at the University of Navarra, where he subsequently taught for more than twenty years, while he also pursued a successful career in journalism. He began his radio career at Radiocadena Española in Pamplona in 1982, as an announcer-commentator. In the university classrooms, he trained many communications professionals, including Helena Resano, Carlos del Amor, Almudena Ariza, Pedro Blanco, and Jesús Cintora.

In 1986, he was hired by National Radio of Spain in Navarre to a position in sports information. He was subsequently appointed the head of News and Programs in 1993. In June 1996 he moved to Madrid to take up the post of director of Radio 5 Todo Noticias. Three years later, he transferred to television, directing the Channel 24 Horas of TVE, and the following year combined this position with that of Deputy Director of Information Services of TVE. In that year, looking for new faces for the TV news, he received a tape of Letizia Ortiz from director José Luis Hernández, and ultimately hired her to take over the morning newscast. In 2014, Ortiz became the Queen consort of Spain.

He left TVE in April 2004, and beginning in the following month until the time of his death, Roncal was a professor in the Master's in Television Journalism program at the Official Institute of RTVE. He died suddenly on 19 August 2018, due to a heart attack, while he vacationed in Pamplona. He was cremated in Pamplona the following day.

== Personal life ==
Roncal was born in Pamplona on 23 September 1962. He was married to journalist Pilar García Muñiz. The couple had a son who was twelve years of age at the time of Roncal's death.
