= Roncalli Catholic High School =

Private, coeducational school in Omaha, Nebraska, United States

Location
- 6401 Sorensen Parkway; Omaha, (Douglas County), Nebraska 68152; United States; 41°18′52″N 96°0′38″W

Information
- Type: Private, coeducational
- Religious affiliation: Roman Catholic
- President: Sean Keisling
- Head teacher: Paul Hans
- Principal: T. J. Orr
- Chaplain: Chibuzor Igboanusi
- Grades: 9–12
- Colors: Crimson and gold
- Mascot: Rocky the Lion
- Team name: Crimson Pride
- Accreditation: North Central Association of Colleges and Schools
- Tuition: $10,300

Roncalli Catholic High School is a private, Catholic high school in Omaha, Nebraska. It is located in the Archdiocese of Omaha.

== History ==
The school was formed by a merger of all-girls Notre Dame Academy with all-boys Rummel High School in 1974. It is named after Pope John XXIII, Angelo Giuseppe Roncalli.

== Athletics ==
Roncalli Catholic is a member of the Nebraska School Activities Association. They have won the following NSAA State Championships:

- Boys' basketball – 1996

== Notable people ==
- Alec Bohm, 3rd overall pick in the 2018 Major League Baseball draft, third baseman for the Philadelphia Phillies
- Tim Burke, former MLB player for the Montreal Expos, New York Mets, and New York Yankees
- Dan Osborn (class of 1994), trade union leader and independent candidate in the 2024 United States Senate election in Nebraska.
- Jim Skow, former NFL defensive end and 58th overall pick in the 1986 NFL draft
