= 2024 United States Senate election in Nebraska =

- November 5, 2024
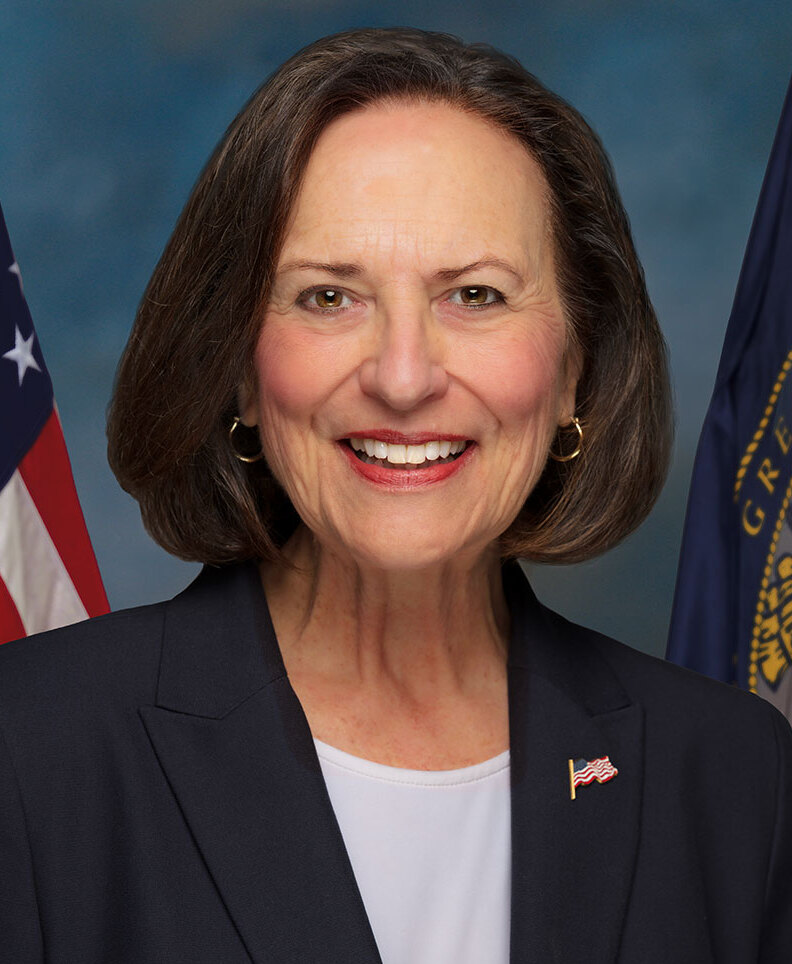

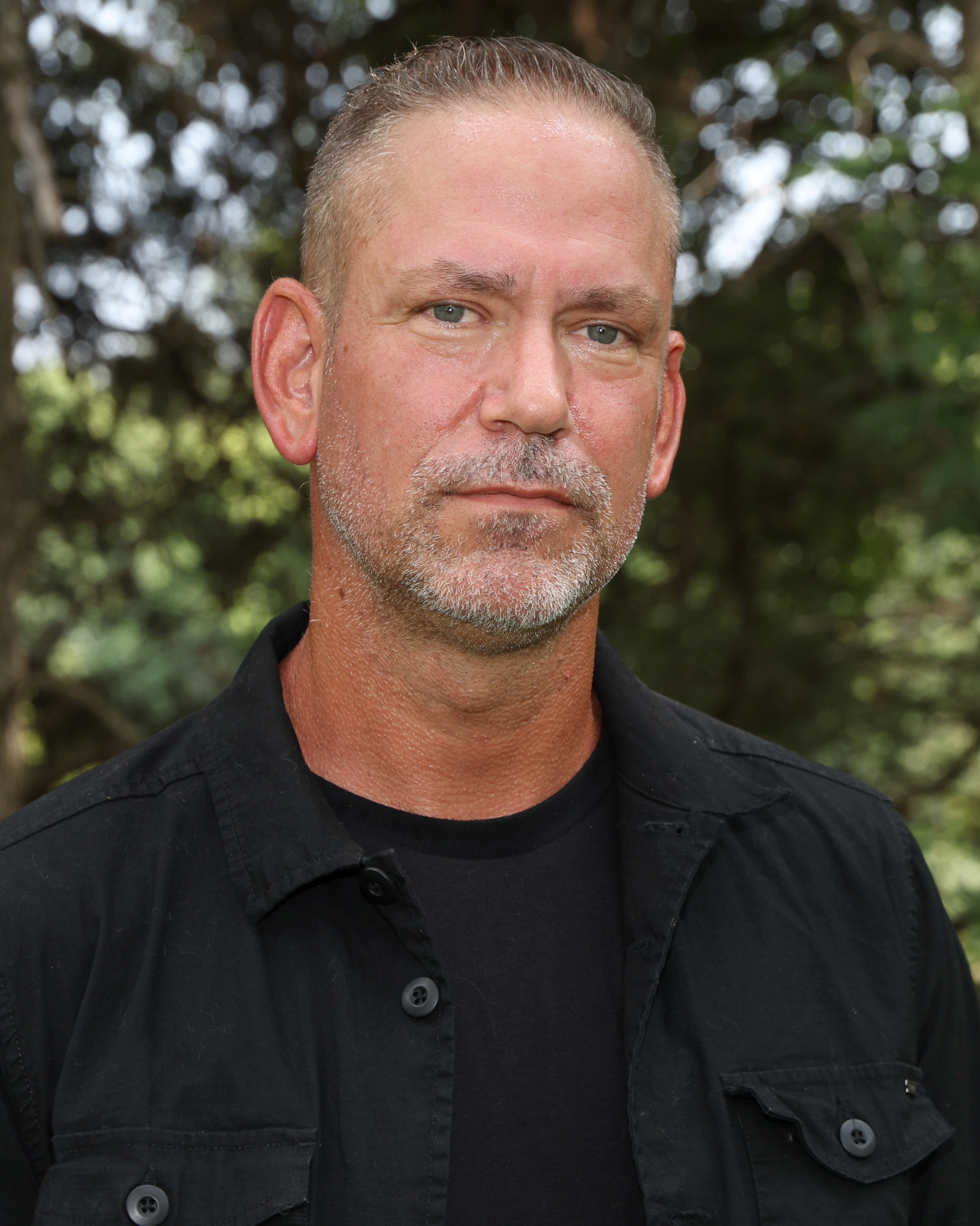
Nominee	Deb Fischer	Dan Osborn
Party	Republican	Independent
Popular vote	499,124	436,493
Percentage	53.19%	46.52%
- Fischer: 50–60% 60–70% 70–80% 80–90% >90% Osborn: 50–60% 60–70% 70–80% 80–90% >90%
U.S. senator before election
Deb Fischer
Republican
Elected U.S. senator
Deb Fischer
Republican

The 2024 United States Senate election in Nebraska was held on November 5, 2024, to elect a member of the United States Senate to represent the state of Nebraska. Republican incumbent Deb Fischer was re-elected to a third term, defeating independent union leader Dan Osborn. This was the first time since 1954 when both of Nebraska's U.S. Senate seats were concurrently up for election due to a special election for Nebraska's other Senate seat.

Traditionally a safe Republican seat, the race in Nebraska was described as unusually competitive and was also potentially important for determining partisan control of the Senate after the 2024 election cycle.

Despite her win, Fischer's overall performance was the worst an incumbent Republican performed in a Nebraska Senate race since 1970. Osborn's performance was the best for an independent candidate in a Nebraska Senate race, even outperforming George W. Norris, who won as an independent in 1936 in a three way race. His performance was also the best for any challenger in a Republican-held seat in the 2024 election cycle. Osborn won four counties, of which in the concurrent presidential race two voted for Donald Trump (Thurston and Sarpy) and two voted for Kamala Harris (Douglas and Lancaster), and Fischer won all other 89 counties.

== Republican primary ==
=== Candidates ===
==== Nominee ====
- Deb Fischer, incumbent U.S. senator (2013–present)

==== Eliminated in primary ====
- Arron Kowalski, cattle farmer and perennial candidate

=== Fundraising ===
Campaign finance reports as of April 24, 2024
Candidate	Raised	Spent	Cash on hand
Deb Fischer (R)	$5,694,779	$3,512,236	$2,694,160
Source: Federal Election Commission

=== Results ===
Primary results by county Fischer: 60–70%; 70–80%; 80–90%

Republican primary results
Party	Candidate	Votes	%
Republican	Deb Fischer (incumbent)	174,820	79.76%
Republican	Arron Kowalski	44,334	20.24%
Total votes		219,154	100.00%

== Democratic primary ==
Due to Dan Osborn's independent candidacy, the Nebraska Democratic Party had originally not intended to field a candidate, planning to endorse Osborn on May 18. However, on May 15, Osborn stated that he would not accept the help of any political party. This led to a condemnation by state party chair Jane Kleeb, who said that Osborn had previously promised to work with them in exchange for them not running a candidate. Due to Osborn's announcement taking place the day after the state's primary, Kleeb announced that they would be looking for a write-in candidate to run under the party banner in November. However, they ultimately decided not to run a write-in candidate.

== Independent ==
=== Declared ===
- Dan Osborn, mechanic and former president of Bakery, Confectionery, Tobacco Workers and Grain Millers International Union Local 50G

=== Fundraising ===
Campaign finance reports as of April 24, 2024
Candidate	Raised	Spent	Cash on hand
Dan Osborn (I)	$812,114	$427,220	$384,894
Source: Federal Election Commission

== Legal Marijuana NOW primary ==
The Legal Marijuana NOW primary attracted controversy, with one candidate, Kerry Eddy, admitting that she supported independent Dan Osborn. Eddy, who was a registered Democrat until March 2024, feared that the Legal Marijuana NOW Party's nominee could pull votes away from Osborn, who supports legalizing marijuana. Eddy was recruited to run by political blogger Julia Schleck, who had outlined a plan to run a candidate who would "sweep the [Legal Marijuana NOW] primary and then take their name off the ballot and endorse Osborn, throwing their votes his way." Eddy denied that her intention was to drop out of the race after securing the nomination, though she said she would consider it.

Party chair Mark Elworth Jr. denounced Eddy's plan as "shenangians." The party instead supported Ken Peterson, who had been recruited to run by Elworth. Peterson alleged that supporters of Osborn had repeatedly urged him to drop out of the race. Osborn's campaign denied having any involvement in the Legal Marijuana NOW primary, though a pro-Osborn super PAC spent over $30,000 supporting Eddy's campaign.

=== Withdrew after nomination ===
- Kerry Eddy, administrative coordinator (endorsed Osborn)

=== Lost nomination ===
- Ken Peterson, compost facility attendant

=== Fundraising ===
Campaign finance reports as of April 24, 2024
Candidate	Raised	Spent	Cash on hand
Kerry Eddy (LMN)	$16,384	$922	$15,462
Source: Federal Election Commission

=== Results ===
Legal Marijuana NOW Party primary results
Party	Candidate	Votes	%
Legal Marijuana NOW	Kerry Eddy	743	70.83%
Legal Marijuana NOW	Kenneth Peterson	306	29.17%
Total votes		1,049	100.00%

=== Aftermath ===
After Kerry Eddy won the May primary by a wide margin, she said she was still evaluating whether or not to drop out of the race. Complicating Eddy's plan was that if she rejected the Legal Marijuana NOW Party's nomination, the party could simply name a replacement nominee. Mark Elworth Jr. pledged to seek the party's nomination for Senate if Eddy dropped out. It was also suggested that Elworth could use the party's ballot line to nominate a Democrat.

Eddy dropped out of the race on July 30 and endorsed Osborn, though she maintained that this had not been her intention from the start. The party had until September 3 to name a replacement nominee. On August 14, the party held a convention to determine whether or not a new nominee should be named and who that nominee would be. Supporters of Eddy and Osborn were barred from participating in the convention. In response, Eddy's campaign treasurer sent a letter to party leadership arguing that they had broken the law and that if they tried to name a replacement nominee, a lawsuit could be filed.

The party ultimately did not put forward a candidate. Elworth said the party did not have the resources to fight a lawsuit and that "we don’t want to deal with it." Unnamed members of the party alleged that Osborn and Eddy's supporters had taken it over in order to ensure it would not place a candidate on the ballot. Elworth called Osborn "dishonest" and said he would be voting for incumbent Deb Fischer, who opposes legalizing marijuana.

== Libertarian Party ==
In March 2024, independent candidate Dan Osborn sought the support of the Nebraska Libertarian Party. However, he decided against this, instead running as an independent without any party's support.

=== Declined ===
- Dan Osborn, mechanic and former president of Bakery, Confectionery, Tobacco Workers and Grain Millers International Union Local 50G (running as an independent)

== General election ==
=== Predictions ===
Source	Ranking	As of
The Cook Political Report	Lean R	October 21, 2024
Inside Elections	Lean R	October 18, 2024
Sabato's Crystal Ball	Lean R	September 25, 2024
Decision Desk HQ/The Hill	Likely R	October 30, 2024
Elections Daily	Likely R	November 4, 2024
CNalysis	Tilt R	November 4, 2024
RealClearPolitics	Lean R	October 15, 2024
Split Ticket	Lean R	October 29, 2024
538	Likely R	October 23, 2024

=== Fundraising ===
Campaign finance reports as of October 16, 2024
Candidate	Raised	Spent	Cash on hand
Deb Fischer (R)	$7,993,392	$7,922,195	$582,814
Dan Osborn (I)	$7,962,610	$6,827,048	$1,135,561
Source: Federal Election Commission

=== Endorsements ===
Deb Fischer (R)

U.S. executive branch officials

- Kellyanne Conway, former senior counselor to the president (2017–2020)
- Donald Trump, 45th president of the United States (2017–2021)

U.S. senators

- Pete Ricketts, U.S. senator from Nebraska (2023–present)

U.S. representatives

- Lee Terry, former U.S. representative for NE-02 (1999–2015)

State executive officials

- Lavon Heidemann, former lieutenant governor of Nebraska (2013–2014)
- Dave Heineman, former governor of Nebraska (2005–2015)
- Kay Orr, former governor of Nebraska (1987–1991)
- Jim Pillen, governor of Nebraska (2023–present)

State legislators

- Mike Groene, former state senator for the 42nd district (2015–2022)
- Steve Halloran, state senator for the 33rd district (2017–2025)
- Bill Kintner, former state senator for the 2nd district (2013–2017)

Individuals

- Charles Herbster, agribusiness executive and candidate for governor in 2014 and 2022

Organizations

- American Israel Public Affairs Committee (AIPAC)
- Maggie's List
- National Rifle Association Political Victory Fund
- Nebraska Farm Bureau
- U.S. Chamber of Commerce

Labor unions

- Omaha Police Officers Association
Dan Osborn (I)

State legislators

- Adrian Boafo, Maryland state delegate from the 23rd district (2023–present)

Individuals

- Harry Dunn, former U.S. Capitol Police officer
- Julia Louis-Dreyfus, actress and comedian

Labor unions

- Bakery, Confectionery, Tobacco Workers and Grain Millers International Union Local 50G
- Communications Workers of America
- International Union of Elevator Constructors Local 28
- Nebraska AFL-CIO
- Office and Professional Employees International Union
- 3 United Association locals (Note: Plumbers Local 16, Sprinkler Fitters Local 699, and Steamfitters Local 664)
- United Auto Workers

Political parties

- Forward Party
- Reform Party

=== Polling ===
Aggregate polls

Source of poll aggregation	Dates administered	Dates updated	Deb Fischer (R)	Dan Osborn (I)	Undecided (Note: Calculated by taking the difference of 100% and all other candidates combined.)	Margin
538	through October 31, 2024	November 1, 2024	46.6%	44.2%	9.2%	Fischer +2.4
TheHill/DDHQ	through October 31, 2024	November 1, 2024	48.3%	47.0%	4.7%	Fischer +1.3
Race to the WH	through October 28, 2024	October 30, 2024	47.0%	46.0%	7.0%	Fischer +1.0
Average			47.3%	45.7%	6.7%	Fischer +1.6

Poll source	Date(s) administered	Sample size (Note: Key: A – all adults RV – registered voters LV – likely voters V – unclear)	Margin of error	Deb Fischer (R)	Dan Osborn (I)	Undecided
Change Research (D) (Note: Poll sponsored by Osborn's campaign)	October 30–31, 2024	600 (LV)	± 4.3%	47%	47%	5%
Torchlight Strategies (R) (Note: Poll sponsored by Fischer's campaign)	October 25–28, 2024	605 (LV)	± 3.9%	51%	44%	5%
Economist/YouGov	October 21–28, 2024	1,202 (LV)	± 3.5%	50%	43%	7% (Note: "Someone else" with 2%)
NYT/Siena College	October 23–26, 2024	1,194 (LV)	± 3.2%	48%	46%	5%
NYT/Siena College	October 23–26, 2024	1,194 (RV)	± 3.1%	46%	47%	6%
Change Research (D)	October 18–21, 2024	815 (LV)	–	46%	48%	6%
Torchlight Strategies (R)	October 12–15, 2024	625 (LV)	± 3.9%	51%	45%	4%
SurveyUSA	October 9–12, 2024	563 (LV)	± 4.7%	44%	50%	6%
Torchlight Strategies (R)	October 5–8, 2024	800 (LV)	± 4.0%	48%	42%	10%
Change Research (D)	October 3–8, 2024	895 (LV)	± 3.5%	43%	46%	11%
Impact Research (D)	October 1–3, 2024	600 (LV)	± 4.0%	46%	48%	6%
The Bullfinch Group (Note: Poll sponsored by Independent Center, a centrist advocacy group)	September 27 – October 1, 2024	400 (LV)	± 4.9%	42%	47%	10%
SurveyUSA	September 20–23, 2024	558 (LV)	± 4.8%	44%	45%	11%
Global Strategy Group (D) (Note: Poll sponsored by Retire Career Politicians PAC, which supports Osborn)	August 26–29, 2024	600 (LV)	–	43%	42%	15%
SurveyUSA (Note: Poll sponsored by Split Ticket)	August 23–27, 2024	1,293 (RV)	± 3.6%	39%	38%	23%
YouGov	July 31 – August 12, 2024	500 (RV)	± 5.2%	43%	41%	16%
Red Wave Strategy Group/ Impact Research	July 8–11, 2024	500 (RV)	–	42%	42%	16%
Global Strategy Group (D)	June 3–5, 2024	600 (LV)	–	49%	36%	15%
Public Policy Polling (D)	April 24–25, 2024	737 (RV)	± 3.6%	37%	33%	30%
Change Research (D) (Note: Poll sponsored by Nebraska Railroaders for Public Safety, which supports Osborn)	November 13–16, 2023	1,048 (LV)	± 3.1%	38%	40%	22%

Hypothetical polling

Deb Fischer vs. Dan Osborn vs. Kerry Eddy

Poll source	Date(s) administered	Sample size	Margin of error	Deb Fischer (R)	Dan Osborn (I)	Kerry Eddy (LMN)	Undecided
Torchlight Strategies (R)	July 8–11, 2024	698 (LV)	± 3.7%	50%	24%	9%	17%

=== Results ===
2024 United States Senate election in Nebraska
Party	Candidate	Votes	%	±%
Republican	Deb Fischer (incumbent)	499,124	53.19%	−4.50%
Independent	Dan Osborn	436,493	46.52%	—
Write-in		2,719	0.29%	—
Majority		62,631	6.67%	−12.40%
Total votes		938,336	100.00%	
Republican hold				

==== Results by county ====
2024 United States Senate Election in Nebraska
County	Deb Fischer Republican		Dan Osborn Independent		Write-in Various		Margin		Total
County	#	%	#	%	#	%	#	%	Total
Adams	8,869	62.25%	5,336	37.45%	42	0.29%	3,533	24.80%	14,247
Antelope	2,580	75.66%	829	24.31%	1	0.03%	1,751	51.35%	3,410
Arthur	234	83.57%	46	16.43%	0	0.00%	188	67.14%	280
Banner	310	80.73%	74	19.27%	0	0.00%	236	61.46%	384
Blaine	227	77.74%	64	21.92%	1	0.34%	163	55.82%	292
Boone	2,274	75.67%	727	24.19%	4	0.13%	1,547	51.48%	3,005
Box Butte	3,198	65.79%	1,642	33.78%	21	0.43%	1,556	32.01%	4,861
Boyd	948	89.35%	113	10.65%	0	0.00%	835	78.70%	1,061
Brown	1,243	76.30%	382	23.45%	4	0.25%	861	52.85%	1,629
Buffalo	15,147	64.10%	8,423	35.64%	61	0.26%	6,724	28.46%	23,631
Burt	2,185	60.71%	1,410	39.18%	4	0.11%	775	21.53%	3,599
Butler	3,222	71.02%	1,297	28.59%	18	0.40%	1,925	42.43%	4,537
Cass	9,051	58.25%	6,457	41.56%	30	0.19%	2,594	16.69%	15,538
Cedar	3,693	75.65%	1,179	24.15%	10	0.20%	2,514	51.50%	4,882
Chase	1,485	80.31%	364	19.69%	0	0.00%	1,121	60.62%	1,849
Cherry	2,336	78.10%	641	21.43%	14	0.47%	1,695	56.67%	2,991
Cheyenne	3,176	71.10%	1,280	28.65%	11	0.25%	996	42.45%	4,467
Clay	2,397	73.19%	870	26.56%	8	0.24%	1,527	46.63%	3,275
Colfax	2,296	66.21%	1,161	33.48%	11	0.32%	1,135	32.73%	3,468
Cuming	3,145	71.32%	1,258	28.53%	7	0.16%	1,887	42.79%	4,410
Custer	4,409	75.17%	1,447	24.67%	9	0.15%	2,962	50.50%	5,865
Dakota	3,082	51.56%	2,872	48.05%	23	0.38%	210	3.51%	5,977
Dawes	2,501	65.16%	1,333	34.73%	4	0.10%	1,168	30.43%	3,838
Dawson	5,556	65.88%	2,859	33.90%	19	0.23%	2,697	31.98%	8,434
Deuel	724	72.26%	276	27.54%	2	0.20%	448	44.72%	1,002
Dixon	1,973	69.25%	872	30.61%	4	0.14%	1,101	38.64%	2,849
Dodge	9,108	55.90%	7,137	43.80%	49	0.30%	1,971	12.10%	16,294
Douglas	111,211	41.25%	157,317	58.35%	1,082	0.40%	-46,106	-17.10%	269,610
Dundy	722	78.99%	192	21.01%	0	0.00%	530	57.98%	914
Fillmore	2,017	67.14%	985	32.79%	2	0.07%	1,032	34.35%	3,004
Franklin	1,204	75.72%	381	23.96%	5	0.31%	823	51.76%	1,590
Frontier	1,055	75.68%	336	24.10%	3	0.22%	719	51.58%	1,394
Furnas	1,784	74.09%	619	25.71%	5	0.21%	1,165	48.38%	2,408
Gage	6,262	57.49%	4,601	42.24%	30	0.28%	1,661	15.25%	10,893
Garden	831	75.07%	273	24.66%	3	0.27%	558	50.41%	1,107
Garfield	791	79.18%	204	20.42%	4	0.40%	587	58.76%	999
Gosper	854	75.91%	270	24.00%	1	0.09%	584	51.91%	1,125
Grant	322	89.44%	37	10.28%	1	0.28%	285	79.16%	360
Greeley	909	74.39%	310	25.37%	3	0.25%	599	49.02%	1,222
Hall	13,335	58.95%	9,225	40.78%	61	0.27%	4,110	18.17%	22,621
Hamilton	4,004	72.51%	1,505	27.25%	13	0.24%	2,499	45.26%	5,522
Harlan	1,368	76.25%	420	23.41%	6	0.33%	948	52.84%	1,794
Hayes	434	88.39%	57	11.61%	0	0.00%	377	76.78%	491
Hitchcock	1,069	75.18%	351	24.68%	2	0.14%	718	50.50%	1,422
Holt	4,074	75.49%	1,306	24.20%	17	0.31%	2,768	51.29%	5,397
Hooker	323	76.36%	99	23.40%	1	0.24%	224	52.96%	423
Howard	2,489	70.87%	1,016	28.93%	7	0.20%	1,473	41.94%	3,512
Jefferson	2,252	62.23%	1,365	37.72%	2	0.06%	887	24.51%	3,619
Johnson	1,219	57.10%	912	42.72%	4	0.19%	307	14.38%	2,135
Kearney	2,595	71.82%	1,004	27.79%	14	0.39%	1,591	44.03%	3,613
Keith	2,963	71.31%	1,185	28.52%	7	0.17%	1,778	42.79%	4,155
Keya Paha	450	83.33%	85	15.74%	5	0.93%	365	67.59%	540
Kimball	1,206	71.49%	476	28.22%	5	0.30%	730	43.27%	1,687
Knox	3,225	73.41%	1,160	26.41%	8	0.18%	2,065	47.00%	4,393
Lancaster	65,295	41.57%	91,356	58.16%	417	0.27%	-26,061	-16.59%	157,068
Lincoln	10,646	65.09%	5,658	34.59%	53	0.32%	4,988	30.50%	16,357
Logan	357	80.95%	82	18.59%	2	0.45%	275	62.36%	441
Loup	339	78.65%	92	21.35%	0	0.00%	247	57.30%	431
Madison	10,523	67.72%	4,997	32.16%	20	0.13%	5,526	35.56%	15,540
McPherson	237	84.95%	42	15.05%	0	0.00%	195	69.90%	279
Merrick	3,226	74.40%	1,090	25.14%	20	0.46%	2,136	49.26%	4,336
Morrill	1,730	72.84%	640	26.95%	5	0.21%	1,090	45.89%	2,375
Nance	1,244	68.35%	575	31.59%	1	0.05%	669	36.76%	1,820
Nemaha	2,014	59.55%	1,361	40.24%	7	0.21%	653	19.31%	3,382
Nuckolls	1,566	70.38%	651	29.26%	8	0.36%	915	41.12%	2,225
Otoe	4,720	58.05%	3,398	41.79%	13	0.16%	1,322	16.26%	8,131
Pawnee	896	65.45%	472	34.48%	1	0.07%	424	30.97%	1,369
Perkins	1,088	76.24%	338	23.69%	1	0.07%	750	52.55%	1,427
Phelps	3,787	76.35%	1,152	23.23%	21	0.42%	2,635	53.12%	4,960
Pierce	2,917	75.14%	953	24.55%	12	0.31%	1,964	50.59%	3,882
Platte	10,994	70.36%	4,601	29.45%	30	0.19%	6,393	40.91%	15,625
Polk	2,048	72.29%	779	27.50%	6	0.21%	1,269	44.79%	2,833
Red Willow	4,537	86.09%	727	13.80%	6	0.11%	3,810	72.29%	5,270
Richardson	2,336	60.44%	1,516	39.22%	13	0.34%	820	21.22%	3,865
Rock	669	81.09%	156	18.91%	0	0.00%	513	62.18%	825
Saline	3,020	53.65%	2,593	46.07%	16	0.28%	427	7.58%	5,629
Sarpy	49,448	49.69%	49,817	50.06%	241	0.24%	-369	-0.37%	99,506
Saunders	8,499	63.12%	4,941	36.70%	24	0.18%	3,558	26.42%	13,464
Scotts Bluff	9,407	62.81%	5,528	36.91%	41	0.27%	3,879	25.90%	14,976
Seward	5,855	63.74%	3,310	36.03%	21	0.23%	2,545	27.71%	9,186
Sheridan	1,889	76.73%	567	23.03%	6	0.24%	1,322	53.70%	2,462
Sherman	1,134	68.03%	526	31.55%	7	0.42%	608	36.48%	1,667
Sioux	531	79.02%	141	20.98%	0	0.00%	390	58.04%	672
Stanton	2,235	73.84%	789	26.07%	3	0.10%	1,446	47.77%	3,027
Thayer	2,013	70.43%	839	29.36%	6	0.21%	1,174	41.07%	2,858
Thomas	300	77.92%	81	21.04%	4	1.04%	219	56.88%	385
Thurston	951	46.55%	1,092	53.45%	0	0.00%	-141	-6.90%	2,043
Valley	1,657	72.58%	620	27.16%	6	0.26%	1,037	45.42%	2,283
Washington	7,815	62.71%	4,621	37.08%	27	0.22%	3,194	25.63%	12,463
Wayne	2,588	63.63%	1,469	36.12%	10	0.25%	1,119	27.51%	4,067
Webster	1,284	73.88%	448	25.78%	6	0.35%	836	48.10%	1,738
Wheeler	378	79.75%	96	20.25%	0	0.00%	282	59.50%	474
York	4,614	66.20%	2,339	33.56%	17	0.24%	2,275	32.64%	6,970
Totals	499,124	53.19%	436,493	46.52%	2,719	0.29%	62,631	6.67%	938,336

Counties that flipped from Republican to Independent

- Thurston (largest village: Pender)
- Sarpy (largest city: Bellevue)

Counties that flipped from Democratic to Independent

- Douglas (largest city: Omaha)
- Lancaster (largest city: Lincoln)

==== By congressional district ====
Despite losing the state, Osborn won two of three congressional districts, which both elected Republicans.

District	Fischer	Osborn	Representative
1st	49%	51%	Mike Flood
2nd	44%	56%	Don Bacon
3rd	67%	33%	Adrian Smith

== See also ==
- 2024 United States Senate elections
- 2024 Nebraska elections
- List of third-party and independent candidacies in United States Senate elections
  - 2014 United States Senate election in Kansas
  - 2020 United States Senate election in Alaska
  - 2022 United States Senate election in Utah

== Notes ==
Partisan clients
