= FiftyPlusOne =

American political website

- Website type: Political analysis and blog
- Predecessor: FiveThirtyEight (by Nate Silver)
- Owners: G. Elliott Morris, Mary Radcliffe, Katie Marriner
- Website: fiftyplusone.news
- Commercial: Yes
- Registration: No
- Launched: September 2025

FiftyPlusOne is an American poll aggregating and forecasting website founded by three former employees of FiveThirtyEight. It became the polling data partner of MS NOW in October 2026. Later that month, the group gained national attention for its investigations into fraudulent polling firms.

== Investigations ==
=== Wedgewood Polls ===
On October 20, 2026, FiftyPlusOne contacted Wedgewood Polls about an investigation they were conducting on their polling research. Following their request for information, Wedgewood released a public statement on social media stating that they had released several polls with fraudulent data, claiming it was a "social experiment". Their fraudulent polls had been included on several polling aggregators such as those run by The New York Times, FiftyPlusOne, and Nate Silver, and was founded by a person experienced in the polling industry. In one of these polls for the Michigan U.S. Senate election, the support for Democratic candidate Mallory McMorrow in the primary was claimed to have fallen to nine percent, and that McMorrow was the only Democratic candidate who did not lead presumptive Republican nominee Mike Rogers in hypothetical general election polls. McMorrow's campaign attributed the poll to a drop in donations. In the scarcely-polled Democratic primary for Wisconsin's gubernatorial election, Wedgewood showed democratic socialist Francesca Hong leading the primary field. A poll was also released for the Mississippi U.S. Senate election showing Democratic nominee Scott Colom within the margin of error of Republican senator Cindy Hyde-Smith, which was believed to have increased fundraising for his campaign. Of all of its publicly-released polls, it claimed that only one of them in Nebraska was legitimate.

=== SoCal Strategies ===
Following the inquiry into Wedgewood Polls, FiftyPlusOne also launched an investigation in SoCal Strategies, with the authenticity of two of their polls in doubt. Their website and social media accounts subsequently went offline.
