= Split Ticket (website) =

American political forecasting website

- Available in: English
- Founded: 31 December 2021
- Country of origin: United States
- Founders: Lakshya Jain; Harrison Lavelle; Armin Thomas
- Website: split-ticket.org

Split Ticket is an American political forecasting website that was founded in 2021. The website predicts elections for the United States presidential election by state, the United States Senate, the United States House of Representatives, and gubernatorial elections.

== History ==
The website was founded in 2021 by Lakshya Jain, Harrison Lavelle, and Armin Thomas. The interest for the website initially came from a Twitter community known as Election Twitter. Leon Sit joined the website in 2022, and Max McCall joined in 2024. Jain first entered political media following the 2016 United States presidential election, and the surprise that came from the unexpected result. In August 2025, Split Ticket announced an exclusive partnership with The Argument, a Washington, D.C.–based liberal media company under which Jain and the team would lead political and elections data coverage; while the Split Ticket website would continue to exist, the group stated that "we will be publishing the bulk of our analysis there for the foreseeable future".

In 2023, they used a "wins above replacement" method to determine what candidates over performed expectations, based on the PVI and the political environment. They found that Joe Manchin and Jon Tester were the two winning candidates that performed the best, above what was expected. They also found that Republican Problem Solvers and Blue Dogs performed better in both caucuses and the 2022 general election.

In 2025, Split Ticket co-founder Lakshya Jain was involved in an online debate known as the "WAR wars" over the group’s "wins above replacement" model for evaluating candidate performance. G. Elliott Morris published a competing WAR model and argued that Split Ticket’s finding that moderates perform better in elections was incorrect. Jake Grumbach (University of California, Berkeley) and Adam Bonica (Stanford) later published a critique calling the Split Ticket model "biased" and "constructed in a way that makes moderates look good and progressives look bad". Nate Silver appeared with Jain on a podcast in response, describing Grumbach and Bonica's article as "awful".

== Predictions ==
In making predictions, the website focuses on polling aggregators that factor in how old a poll is, quality of other polls, population, and sample size.

During the 2024 election cycle, the group correctly forecasted 513 out of 525 federal elections using their quantitative models, missing 3 out of 56 calls at the presidential level, 8 out of 435 in the House of Representatives, and 1 out of 34 races in the Senate elections, for a 98% accuracy rating overall. This placed them only behind 538 for call accuracy among 2024 political handicappers.

== See also ==
- Split-ticket voting
