= Elections in Idaho =

Some type of election in Idaho occurs annually in each of the state's cities and towns, the exact type of which is dependent on the year. Elections for federal and statewide offices occur in even-numbered years, while municipal elections occur in odd-numbered years.

Idaho voters may register in the Republican, Democratic, Libertarian or Constitution parties, or may choose to decline party preference and register as unaffiliated. Idaho allows same-day registration, as well as party affiliation, changes at both the primary and general elections.

In a 2020 study, Idaho was ranked as the 18th easiest state in terms of voting ease.

United States presidential election results for Idaho
Year	Republican		Democratic		Third party(ies)	
Year	No.	%	No.	%	No.	%
1892	8,599	44.31%	0	0.00%	10,808	55.69%
1896	6,314	21.32%	23,135	78.10%	172	0.58%
1900	27,198	46.96%	29,414	50.79%	1,302	2.25%
1904	47,783	65.84%	18,480	25.46%	6,315	8.70%
1908	52,621	54.09%	36,162	37.17%	8,510	8.75%
1912	32,810	31.02%	33,921	32.08%	39,023	36.90%
1916	55,368	41.13%	70,054	52.04%	9,193	6.83%
1920	88,975	65.60%	46,579	34.34%	70	0.05%
1924	69,879	47.12%	24,256	16.36%	54,160	36.52%
1928	97,322	64.22%	52,926	34.93%	1,293	0.85%
1932	71,417	38.27%	109,479	58.66%	5,729	3.07%
1936	66,256	33.19%	125,683	62.96%	7,678	3.85%
1940	106,553	45.31%	127,842	54.36%	773	0.33%
1944	100,137	48.07%	107,399	51.55%	785	0.38%
1948	101,514	47.26%	107,370	49.98%	5,932	2.76%
1952	180,707	65.41%	95,081	34.42%	466	0.17%
1956	166,979	61.17%	105,868	38.78%	142	0.05%
1960	161,597	53.78%	138,853	46.22%	0	0.00%
1964	143,557	49.08%	148,920	50.92%	0	0.00%
1968	165,369	56.79%	89,273	30.66%	36,541	12.55%
1972	199,384	64.24%	80,826	26.04%	30,169	9.72%
1976	204,151	59.88%	126,549	37.12%	10,232	3.00%
1980	290,699	66.46%	110,192	25.19%	36,540	8.35%
1984	297,523	72.36%	108,510	26.39%	5,111	1.24%
1988	253,881	62.08%	147,272	36.01%	7,815	1.91%
1992	202,645	42.03%	137,013	28.42%	142,484	29.55%
1996	256,595	52.18%	165,443	33.65%	69,681	14.17%
2000	336,937	67.17%	138,637	27.64%	26,047	5.19%
2004	409,235	68.38%	181,098	30.26%	8,114	1.36%
2008	403,012	61.21%	236,440	35.91%	19,002	2.89%
2012	420,911	64.09%	212,787	32.40%	23,044	3.51%
2016	409,055	59.25%	189,765	27.48%	91,613	13.27%
2020	554,119	63.67%	287,021	32.98%	29,203	3.36%
2024	605,246	66.61%	274,972	30.26%	28,405	3.13%

== Elected offices ==
=== Federal ===
- President: The state of Idaho is currently apportioned four electors in presidential elections. This number of presidential electors is subject to change based on the results of the decennial United States Census, but has remained unchanged in Idaho since 1912. No Democrat has won the state since Lyndon B. Johnson in 1964, and no Democrat has earned even 40 percent of the vote since then, as of 2020.
- United States Senate: As with all U.S. states, Idaho elects two members to the United States Senate. The current Senators elected from Idaho are Mike Crapo and Jim Risch, both Republicans. Senators serve six-year terms. The most recent U.S. Senate election in the state occurred on November 3, 2022. The next U.S. Senate election in Idaho will occur in 2026.
- United States House of Representatives: Idaho currently has two Congressional districts, each of which elects one member to the United States House of Representatives. The state's incumbent House members, Russ Fulcher and Mike Simpson, are both Republicans. Representatives serve two-year terms. The most recent Congressional elections took place in the state in 2022.

=== State ===
- Governor and lieutenant governor: The governor and lieutenant governor are elected to four-year terms in the next even-year election cycle that follows a presidential election. The offices are contested separately. The current Governor of Idaho is Brad Little, a Republican, who took office in 2019. His lieutenant is Scott Bedke. The most recent election for these offices occurred in 2022.
- Constitutional officers: The constitutional officers of the state are composed of the attorney general, secretary of state, controller, treasurer and superintendent of public instruction. Idaho also previously elected an inspector of mines, but that office was last contested in 1966 and abolished. All are elected to four-year terms in the same cycle as gubernatorial elections. The incumbent officers are all members of the Republican Party.
- Idaho Legislature: The Idaho Legislature is the state's bicameral state legislature. It is composed of two houses:
  - Idaho Senate: The Idaho Senate is the upper house of the state legislature. There are 35 state senatorial districts in the state, each of which elects one member to the Senate. The full Senate is up for election every two years. The most recent election was held in 2024.
  - Idaho House of Representatives: The Idaho House of Representatives is the lower house of the state legislature. There are 35 state house districts in the state, each of which elects two members to the House. The full House is up for election every two years. The most recent election was held in 2024.
- Others
  - Idaho Supreme Court: Idaho Supreme Court justices are elected in nonpartisan elections. Justices hold office for a period of four years and are elected at primary elections in May. The most recent elections for Idaho Supreme Court justices were held on November 8, 2022.
  - Referendum and initiative: Referendum and initiative proposals which qualify for ballot status are voted upon at the next general election on an as-needed basis. State constitutional amendments passed by the Idaho Legislature must be ratified by popular vote in a similar manner.

=== County ===
- County officials: Each of Idaho's 44 counties elect a similar form of county government. Elected county government officials are composed of a three-member county commission, clerk, treasurer, sheriff, assessor and prosecutor. County commissioners are elected to alternating two- and four-year terms while other county officers are elected to four-year terms.
- Precinct committeepersons: Each voting precinct elects a Republican and Democratic precinct committeeperson for two-year terms at the May primary elections. These committeepersons serve on the county-level central committee for their respective political party organizations.

== Local ==
Elections for local government include elections for municipal leadership positions (such as mayor), legislative bodies (such as a city council), and other elections for various municipal positions, boards and commissions, as governed by each municipality's respective ordinances. Of the 200 incorporated cities in the state, all hold municipal elections in odd-numbered years, and most hold them on the traditional election day in November. Most Idaho cities utilize a mayor-council form of government. Lewiston, McCall and Twin Falls are the only Idaho cities which have a council-manager government.

== Party primaries ==
Since 2012 the state's Republican primary has been closed, and only voters registered as Republicans can vote in that contest. Idaho's Democratic primary had been a caucus, but starting in 2020, the state party switched to the use of a mixed primary, in which registered Democrats and unaffiliated voters can vote in their primary election.

== Recent elections ==
=== Federal ===
- Presidential: 2000, 2004, 2008, 2012, 2016, 2020, 2024
- Senatorial: 1998, 2002, 2004, 2008, 2010, 2014, 2016, 2020, 2022
- Congressional: 2006, 2008, 2010, 2012, 2014, 2016, 2018, 2020, 2022, 2024

=== State ===
- General: 2014, 2016, 2018, 2020, 2022, 2024
- Gubernatorial: 1986, 1990, 1994, 1998, 2002, 2006, 2010, 2014, 2018, 2022
- Legislature: 2006, 2010, 2012, 2014, 2016, 2018, 2020, 2022, 2024

== See also ==
- Political party strength in Idaho
- 2020 Idaho elections
