= 2006 Idaho Legislature election =

The 2006 legislative elections in Idaho were for all 35 legislative districts.

== Results ==
District	Seat	Candidate	Party	Vote	Percentage
1	House A	Steve Elgar	Democratic	6,634	49.13%
1	House A	Eric Anderson	Republican	6,869	50.87%
1	House B	Bob Wynhausen	Democratic	4,973	37.24%
1	House B	George E. Eskridge	Republican	8,382	62.76%
1	Senate	Jim Ramsey	Democratic	4,265	31.42%
1	Senate	Shawn A. Keough	Republican	9,308	68.58%
2	House A	Mary Lou Shepherd	Democratic	8,021	100.00%
2	House B	Richard T. Taniguchi	Democratic	4,625	43.62%
2	House B	R.J. Dick Harwood	Republican	5,978	56.38%
2	Senate	Steve Johnson	Democratic	4,426	41.49%
2	Senate	Joyce M. Broadsword	Republican	6,241	58.51%
3	House A	James W. Clark	Republican	9,825	100.00%
3	House B	Phil Hart	Republican	9,751	100.00%
3	Senate	Mike Jorgenson	Republican	9,825	100.00%
4	House A	Bonnie Douglas	Democratic	5,463	46.49%
4	House A	Marge Chadderdon	Republican	6,287	53.51%
4	House B	George C. Sayler	Democratic	6,757	57.15%
4	House B	Sharon Culbreth	Republican	5,066	42.85%
4	Senate	Ray J. Writz	Constitution	233	1.98%
4	Senate	Steven L. Foxx	Democratic	5,536	46.96%
4	Senate	Jeremy Paul Boggess	Independent	293	2.49%
4	Senate	John W Goedde	Republican	5,728	48.58%
5	House A	David Larsen	Democratic	4,278	36.06%
5	House A	Bob Nonini	Republican	7,562	63.74%
5	House A	Rose Johnson	Write-In	23	0.19%
5	House B	Lyndon Harriman	Democratic	4,054	34.46%
5	House B	Frank N. Henderson	Republican	7,710	65.54%
5	Senate	Charles W. Thomas	Democratic	3,929	33.36%
5	Senate	Jim Hammond	Republican	7,848	66.64%
6	House A	Tom Trail	Republican	9,258	100.00%
6	House B	Shirley G. Ringo	Democratic	7,329	61.56%
6	House B	L. Roger Falen	Republican	4,576	38.44%
6	Senate	Gary J. Schroeder	Republican	9,138	100.00%
7	House A	Liz Chavez	Democratic	6,667	55.25%
7	House A	Tony R. Snodderly	Republican	5,400	44.75%
7	House B	John Rusche	Democratic	9,824	100.00%
7	Senate	Mike Naccarato	Democratic	5,912	48.78%
7	Senate	Joe Stegner	Republican	6,207	51.22%
8	House A	Darcy James	Democratic	6,789	47.00%
8	House A	Ken A. Roberts	Republican	7,655	53.00%
8	House B	Charlene Douglas	Democratic	5,411	38.61%
8	House B	Paul E. Shepherd	Republican	8,603	61.39%
8	Senate	Scott McLeod	Democratic	6,958	48.45%
8	Senate	Leland G. Heinrich	Republican	7,403	51.55%
9	House A	Lawerence E. Denney	Republican	9,189	100.00%
9	House B	Clete Edmunson	Republican	9,088	100.00%
9	Senate	Tony Edmondson	Democratic	4,338	38.93%
9	Senate	Monty J. Pearce	Republican	6,805	61.07%
10	House A	Robert Ring	Republican	7,521	100.00%
10	House B	Darlene Madsen	Democratic	3,054	33.73%
10	House B	Darrell Bolz	Republican	6,001	66.27%
10	Senate	John McGee	Republican	7,550	100.00%
11	House A	Kirsten Faith Richardson	Constitution	3,026	24.56%
11	House A	Steven Thayn	Republican	9,294	75.44%
11	House B	Carlos Bilbao	Republican	11,446	100.00%
11	Senate	Jared Eastley	Constitution	3,006	22.95%
11	Senate	Brad Little	Republican	10,090	77.05%
12	House A	Richard Mabbutt	Democratic	3,152	37.28%
12	House A	Robert E Schaefer	Republican	5,303	62.72%
12	House B	Sunny Dawn Freeman-Genz	Democratic	2,672	31.61%
12	House B	Gary E. Collins	Republican	5,781	68.39%
12	Senate	Donald McMurrian	Democratic	2,909	34.21%
12	Senate	Curt McKenzie	Republican	5,594	65.79%
13	House A	Douglas Yarbrough	Democratic	4,231	27.35%
13	House A	Dennis Weiler	Libertarian	608	3.93%
13	House A	Brent Crane	Republican	10,631	68.72%
13	House B	W.W. Deal	Republican	13,188	100.00%
13	Senate	Rohn F. Webb	Democratic	3,807	24.42%
13	Senate	Bryant S. Neal	Libertarian	679	4.36%
13	Senate	Patti Anne Lodge	Republican	11,101	71.22%
14	House A	Mike Moyle	Republican	16,949	100.00%
14	House B	Daniel S. Weston	Democratic	6,943	34.45%
14	House B	Raul R. Labrador	Republican	13,208	65.55%
14	Senate	Glida Bothwell	Democratic	6,591	32.41%
14	Senate	Stan Bastian	Republican	13,746	67.59%
15	House A	Jerry Peterson	Democratic	5,524	44.78%
15	House A	Lynn M. Luker	Republican	6,811	55.22%
15	House B	Marvin D. Gardner	Libertarian	3,107	26.49%
15	House B	Max C. Black	Republican	8,622	73.51%
15	Senate	Phyllis Hower	Democratic	4,721	38.11%
15	Senate	John C. Andreason	Republican	7,667	61.89%
16	House A	Margaret Henbest	Democratic	9,663	100.00%
16	House B	Les Bock	Democratic	6,458	52.68%
16	House B	Jana M. Kemp	Republican	5,802	47.32%
16	Senate	David Langhorst	Democratic	9,816	100.00%
17	House A	Katherine B. Frazier	Constitution	414	3.62%
17	House A	Bill Killen	Democratic	6,489	56.72%
17	House A	Kathie Garrett	Republican	4,537	39.66%
17	House B	Jaclyn Ann Crooks	Constitution	375	3.25%
17	House B	Sue Chew	Democratic	6,735	58.38%
17	House B	Janet J. Miller	Republican	4,426	38.37%
17	Senate	Elliot Werk	Democratic	7,680	67.06%
17	Senate	Tim Flaherty	Republican	3,772	32.94%
18	House A	Branden J. Durst	Democratic	6,664	48.63%
18	House A	James Oyler	Libertarian	550	4.01%
18	House A	Debbie Field	Republican	6,489	47.35%
18	House B	Phylis K King	Democratic	7,240	52.53%
18	House B	Julie Ellsworth	Republican	6,543	47.47%
18	Senate	Kate Kelly	Democratic	8,945	63.01%
18	Senate	Brad Bolicek	Republican	5,252	36.99%
19	House A	Anne Pasley-Stuart	Democratic	14,418	100.00%
19	House B	Nicole LeFavour	Democratic	14,217	100.00%
19	Senate	Mike Burkett	Democratic	12,657	75.26%
19	Senate	Charles E Seldon	Republican	4,160	24.74%
20	House A	Rex Kerr	Libertarian	2,501	18.78%
20	House A	Mark A. Snodgrass	Republican	10,813	81.22%
20	House B	Chuck Oxley	Democratic	4,181	30.56%
20	House B	Kevin Charles Jaeger	Libertarian	527	3.85%
20	House B	Shirley McKague	Republican	8,975	65.59%
20	Senate	Laurynda A. Williams	Democratic	5,001	36.09%
20	Senate	Gerry Sweet	Republican	8,855	63.91%
21	House A	John Vander Woude	Republican	13,635	100.00%
21	House B	Clifford R. Bayer	Republican	13,536	100.00%
21	Senate	Russell M. Fulcher	Republican	13,845	100.00%
22	House A	Karen M. Schindele	Democratic	3,163	38.53%
22	House A	Rich Wills	Republican	5,047	61.47%
22	House B	Dawn D. Best	Democratic	3,638	43.80%
22	House B	Pete Nielsen	Republican	4,667	56.20%
22	Senate	Henry Hibbert	Democratic	2,651	32.09%
22	Senate	Tim Corder	Republican	5,611	67.91%
23	House A	Peter Rickards	Democratic	3,499	31.84%
23	House A	Jim Patrick	Republican	7,492	68.16%
23	House B	Bert Brackett	Republican	9,357	100.00%
23	Senate	Bill Chisholm	Democratic	4,139	37.23%
23	Senate	Tom Gannon	Republican	6,977	62.77%
24	House A	Leon Smith	Republican	9,644	100.00%
24	House B	Sharon L. Block	Republican	9,449	100.00%
24	Senate	Charles Coiner	Republican	9,537	100.00%
25	House A	Wendy Jaquet	Democratic	10,702	100.00%
25	House B	Donna Pence	Democratic	10,380	100.00%
25	Senate	Clint Stennett	Democratic	10,760	100.00%
26	House A	Scott F. McClure	Democratic	3,258	32.95%
26	House A	John A. Stevenson	Republican	6,631	67.05%
26	House B	Maxine T. Bell	Republican	8,714	100.00%
26	Senate	Dean L. Cameron	Republican	8,678	100.00%
27	House A	Scott Bedke	Republican	8,801	100.00%
27	House B	Fred Wood	Republican	8,729	100.00%
27	Senate	Denton Darrington	Republican	8,786	100.00%
28	House A	Beverly Beach	Democratic	5,298	44.61%
28	House A	Dennis M. Lake	Republican	6,578	55.39%
28	House B	Jane Bingham Lamprecht	Democratic	4,351	36.84%
28	House B	Jim Marriott	Republican	7,459	63.16%
28	Senate	John Hulse	Democratic	4,512	38.16%
28	Senate	R. Steven Bair	Republican	7,312	61.84%
29	House A	Allen R. Andersen	Democratic	6,997	48.59%
29	House A	Ken Andrus	Republican	7,404	51.41%
29	House B	James D. Ruchti	Democratic	7,266	50.61%
29	House B	Richard D. Kirkham	Republican	7,092	49.39%
29	Senate	Diane Bilyeu	Democratic	7,444	51.27%
29	Senate	Jim Guthrie	Republican	7,074	48.73%
30	House A	Donna Boe	Democratic	9,056	100.00%
30	House B	Elaine Smith	Democratic	6,495	62.06%
30	House B	Joshua R. Thompson	Republican	3,644	34.82%
30	House B	Ann Hope Vegors	United	327	3.12%
30	Senate	Edgar J. Malepeai	Democratic	9,067	100.00%
31	House A	Larry C. Bradford	Republican	12,141	100.00%
31	House B	Tom Loertscher	Republican	12,170	100.00%
31	Senate	Robert L. Geddes	Republican	12,454	100.00%
32	House A	Scott L. Cannon	Democratic	4,390	28.81%
32	House A	Janice K. McGeachin	Republican	10,848	71.19%
32	House B	Dean M. Mortimer	Republican	13,279	100.00%
32	Senate	Tom Holm	Democratic	4,772	30.79%
32	Senate	Melvin Richardson	Republican	10,729	69.21%
33	House A	Jerry Shively	Democratic	6,036	51.25%
33	House A	Jack T. Barraclough	Republican	5,742	48.75%
33	House B	John McGimpsey	Democratic	5,420	46.63%
33	House B	Russ Mathews	Republican	6,203	53.37%
33	Senate	Neil M Williams	Democratic	4,655	39.99%
33	Senate	Bart M. Davis	Republican	6,985	60.01%
34	House A	Mack G. Shirley	Republican	10,815	100.00%
34	House B	Dell Raybould	Republican	10,492	100.00%
34	Senate	Brent Hill	Republican	10,076	93.33%
34	Senate	Dan Roberts	Write-In	720	6.67%
35	House A	Jo An E. Wood	Republican	12,041	100.00%
35	House B	Jon Winegarner	Democratic	3,888	27.91%
35	House B	Lenore Hardy Barrett	Republican	10,041	72.09%
35	Senate	Luke Prange	Democratic	4,327	30.59%
35	Senate	Jeff C. Siddoway	Republican	9,818	69.41%
