= 2016 Idaho elections =

- November 8, 2016
- Registered: 936,529
- Turnout: 75.9%

A general election was scheduled in the U.S. state of Idaho on November 8, 2016. Along with the presidential election, one United States Senate seat and Idaho's two seats in the United States House of Representatives were up for election, as were all the seats in both chambers of the Idaho Legislature. Primary elections were held on May 17, 2016.

== Federal offices ==
=== President of the United States ===
Republican candidate Donald Trump won in Idaho with 59% of the popular vote and gained four electoral votes from the state.

=== United States Senate ===
One of the two United States Senators representing Idaho was up for election. Incumbent Republican Mike Crapo was re-elected to a fourth term with 66% of the votes.

=== United States House of Representatives ===
Idaho has two representatives in the United States House of Representatives. Incumbent Republicans Raúl Labrador and Mike Simpson were both up for election, and they won their respective races comfortably.

== Judicial elections ==
=== Supreme Court ===
Two seats on the Idaho Supreme Court were up for election.

While Justice Roger Burdick ran unopposed and won a third term, Jim Jones chose not to seek re-election thus creating an open seat.

==== Jones' seat ====
2016 Idaho Supreme Court Justice election
- November 8, 2016

Nominee	Robyn Brody	Curt McKenzie
Party	Nonpartisan	Nonpartisan
Popular vote	298,983	256,719
Percentage	53.80%	46.20%
- Runoff results by county Brody: 50–60% 60–70% 70–80% McKenzie: 50–60% 60–70%
Justice before election
Jim Jones
Nonpartisan
Elected Justice
Robyn Brody
Nonpartisan

Following Jones' retirement, a four-way Nonpartisan primary election was held on May 17. With no candidate winning a clear majority of the votes, the top two finishers advanced to a run-off on November 8, the first such instance in the state since 1998. Rupert attorney Robyn Brody defeated state senator Curt McKenzie in the runoff with 54% of the votes.

===== Nonpartisan primary =====
- Robyn Brody, attorney.
- Curt McKenzie, state senator from the 13th district.
- Clive Strong, chief of the Natural Resources Division, Idaho Attorney General’s office.
- Sergio Gutierrez, Idaho Court of Appeals judge.

Withdrawn

- Chris Troupis, attorney. (endorsed McKenzie)
- William Seiniger, attorney.

Primary dabate

2016 Idaho Supreme Court primary election debate
No.	Date	Host	Moderator	Link	Nonpartisan	Nonpartisan	Nonpartisan	Nonpartisan
Key: P Participant A Absent N Not invited I Invited W Withdrawn								
Key: P Participant A Absent N Not invited I Invited W Withdrawn					Robyn Brody	Clive Strong	Curt McKenzie	Sergio Gutierrez
1	May 5, 2016	IdahoPTV	Melissa Davlin	Idaho PBS	P	P	P	P

===== Primary results =====
Primary results by county: Brody: 50–60%; 40–50%; 30–40%; McKenzie: 40–50%; 30–40%; Gutierrez: 30–40%; 20–30%; Strong: 30–40%

Nonpartisan primary results
Party	Candidate	Votes	%
Nonpartisan	Robyn Brody	45,282	30.3%
Nonpartisan	Curt McKenzie	41,348	27.6%
Nonpartisan	Sergio Gutierrez	31,944	21.4%
Nonpartisan	Clive Strong	30,921	20.7%
Total votes		149,495	100%

Runoff debate

2016 Idaho Supreme Court runoff election debate
No.	Date	Host	Moderator	Link	Nonpartisan	Nonpartisan
Key: P Participant A Absent N Not invited I Invited W Withdrawn						
Key: P Participant A Absent N Not invited I Invited W Withdrawn					Robyn Brody	Curt McKenzie
1	October 27, 2016	IdahoPTV	Melissa Davlin	Idaho PBS	P	P

===== Runoff results =====
2016 Idaho Supreme Court Justice runoff election
Party	Candidate	Votes	%
Nonpartisan	Robyn Brody	298,983	53.8%
Nonpartisan	Curt McKenzie	256,719	46.2%
Total votes		555,702	100%

=== Court of Appeals ===
Idaho Court of Appeals Judge Molly Huskey was appointed by Governor Butch Otter in 2015 to succeed Karen Lansing. She ran for a full term and won unopposed.

== State Legislative elections ==
All 35 seats of the Idaho Senate and 70 seats of the Idaho House of Representatives were up for election.

=== Idaho Senate ===
Party	Before	After	Change
Republican	28	29	▲1
Democratic	7	6	▼1
Total	35	35	

=== Idaho House of Representatives ===
Party	Before	After	Change
Republican	56	59	▲3
Democratic	14	11	▼3
Total	70	70	

== Ballot measures ==
One statewide ballot measure appeared on the ballot.

=== Constitutional Amendment HJR 5 (2016) ===
Results by county: Yes: 50–60%; 60–70%; 70–80%; No: 50–60%

The Idaho Constitutional Amendment HJR 5 sought to provide the state legislature a veto-proof authority to review and approve or reject administrative rules in the state constitution. It was approved 56%-44%.

Idaho Constitutional Amendment HJR 5 (2016)
Choice	Votes	%
For	347,327	55.52
Against	278,219	44.48
Total	625,546	100.00

== See also ==
- Elections in Idaho
- Politics of Idaho
- Political party strength in Idaho
