= 2024 Idaho elections =

- November 5, 2024
- Registered: 1,178,750
- Turnout: 77.8%

A general election was scheduled in the U.S. state of Idaho on November 5, 2024. Along with the presidential election, all seats in both chambers of the Idaho Legislature were up for election, as well as both of Idaho's two seats in the United States House of Representatives. Primary elections elections were held on May 21, 2024.

== Federal offices ==
=== President of the United States ===
Republican candidate Donald Trump won in Idaho with 66% of the popular vote and gained four electoral votes from the state.

=== United States House of Representatives ===
Idaho has two representatives in the United States House of Representatives. Incumbent Republicans Russ Fulcher and Mike Simpson were both up for election, and they won their respective races comfortably.

== State offices ==
=== Legislative ===
All 35 seats in the Idaho Senate and 70 seats in the Idaho House of Representatives were up for election.

==== Idaho Senate ====
Party	Before	After	Change
Republican	28	29	▲1
Democratic	7	6	▼1
Total	35	35	

==== Idaho House of Representatives ====
Party	Before	After	Change
Republican	59	61	▲2
Democratic	11	9	▼2
Total	70	70	

=== Judicial ===
==== Supreme Court ====
Incumbent Idaho Supreme Court justice G. Richard Bevan won re-election unopposed.

==== Court of Appeals ====
Incumbent Idaho Court of Appeals judges David Gratton and Jessica Lorello won re-election unopposed.

== Ballot measures ==
Two statewide ballot measures appeared on the ballot.

=== Constitutional Amendment HJR 5 (2024) ===
The Idaho Constitutional Amendment HJR 5 sought to prohibit state and local governments from allowing non-citizens to vote in elections. It was approved 65%-35%.

Results by county: Yes: 50–60%; 60–70%; 70–80%

Idaho Constitutional Amendment HJR 5 (2024)
Choice	Votes	%
For	572,865	64.93
Against	309,456	35.07
Total	882,321	100.00

=== Proposition 1 ===
The Idaho Proposition 1 or the Idaho Open Primary initiative sought to establish top-four primaries and legalize ranked-choice voting for congressional, state and local elections. It was defeated 70%-30%.

Idaho Propostion 1 (2024)
Choice	Votes	%
For	269,960	30.38
Against	618,753	69.62
Total	888,713	100.00

== See also ==
- Elections in Idaho
- Politics of Idaho
- Political party strength in Idaho
