= 2012 Idaho elections =

- November 6, 2012
- Registered: 896,234
- Turnout: 74.3%

A general election was scheduled in the U.S. state of Idaho on November 6, 2012. Along with the presidential election, Idaho's two seats in the United States House of Representatives were up for election, as were all the seats in both chambers of the state Legislature. Primary elections were held on May 15, 2012.

== Federal offices ==
=== President of the United States ===
Republican candidate Mitt Romney won in Idaho with 64% of the popular vote and gained four electoral votes from the state.

=== United States House of Representatives ===
Idaho has two representatives in the United States House of Representatives. Incumbent Republicans Raúl Labrador and Mike Simpson were both up for election, and they won their respective races comfortably.

== Judicial seats ==
=== Supreme Court ===
Incumbent Idaho Supreme Court Justice Daniel Eismann ran unopposed and secured another term.

=== Court of Appeals ===
Two judges on the Idaho Court of Appeals ran for re-election.

Incumbents David Gratton and John Melanson were both appointed to the court by Governor Otter in 2009. Both of them ran for a full term and won unopposed.

== State legislature ==
All 35 seats of the Idaho Senate and 70 seats of the Idaho House of Representatives were up for election.

=== Idaho Senate ===
Party	Before	After	Change
Republican	28	29	▲1
Democratic	7	6	▼1
Total	35	35	

=== Idaho House of Representatives ===
Party	Before	After	Change
Republican	57	57	Steady
Democratic	13	13	Steady
Total	70	70	

== Ballot measures ==
Five statewide ballot measures appeared on the ballot.

2012 Idaho ballot measures
Name	Description	Votes				Type
Name	Description	Yes	%	No	%	Type
Proposition 1	Limits negotiated agreements between teachers and local school boards and ends the practice of issuing renewable contracts.	277,102	42.74	371,224	57.26	Veto referendum
Proposition 2	Regulates teacher performance pay based on state-mandated test scores, student performance, hard-to-fill positions and leadership.	272,939	42.02	376,689	57.98	Veto referendum
Proposition 3	Amends school district funding, requiring provision of computing devices and online courses for high school graduation.	215,800	33.28	432,667	66.72	Veto referendum
HJR 2	Preserves the rights to hunt, fish and trap in the state.	456,514	73.42	165,289	26.56	Legislatively referred constitutional amendment
SJR 102	Amends the state constitution so that the state board of correction would have the control, direction and management of adult felony probation and parole.	454,175	74.40	156,249	25.60	Legislatively referred constitutional amendment

Results by county

Proposition 1 results by county
Yes:
- 50–60%
No:
- 50–60%
- 60–70%

Proposition 2 results by county
Yes:
- 50–60%
No:
- 50–60%
- 60–70%

Proposition 3 results by county
No:
- 50–60%
- 60–70%
- 70–80%

HJR 2 results by county
Yes:
- 60–70%
- 70–80%
- 80–90%
No:
- 50–60%

SJR 102 results by county
Yes:
- 60–70%
- 70–80%

== See also ==
- Elections in Idaho
- Politics of Idaho
- Political party strength in Idaho
