= List of speakers of the Idaho House of Representatives =

Speaker of the Idaho House of Representatives
- Incumbent; Mike Moyle since December 1, 2022
- Inaugural holder: Frank A. Fenn

This is a complete list of people who have served as speakers of the Idaho House of Representatives to the present.

Order	Name	Party	Legislature	County	Notes
1	Frank A. Fenn	Republican	1st	Idaho	
2	David T. Miller	Republican	2nd		
3	Robert V. Cozier	Republican	3rd	Bingham	Later appointed by William McKinley as U.S. Attorney for the District of Idaho
4	Albert H. Alford	Democratic	4th	Nez Perce	
5	David L. Evans	Democratic		Oneida	
6	Glenn P. McKinley	Democratic		Shoshone	
7	James F. Hunt	Republican	3 terms	Bannock	
8	Paul Clagstone	Republican		Bonner	
9	Charles D. Storey	Republican		Ada	
10	C.S. French	Republican		Canyon	
11	A.H. Connor	Republican		Bonner	
12	B. Harvey Allred	Democratic			
13	M.A. Kiger	Republican		Kootenai	
14	Peter Johnston	Republican		Bingham	
15	M.A. Kiger	Republican		Kootenai	
16	Wallace Gillis	Republican	2 terms	Twin Falls	Also served as the 14th Attorney General of Idaho
17	Donald S. Whitehead	Republican		Ada	Also served as the 23rd and 28th Lieutenant Governor
18	C.A. Bottolfsen	Republican		Butte	Also served as the 17th and 19th Governor
19	Robert Coulter	Democratic		Valley	
20	Troy D. Smith	Democratic	2 terms	Custer	
21	Milton L. Horsley	Republican		Caribou	
22	Francis M. Bistline	Democratic		Bannock	
23	Milton L. Horsley	Republican		Caribou	
24	Willis C. Moffatt	Republican	1944–1946	Ada	
25	Barney Glavin	Republican		Twin Falls	
26	John Hohnhorst	Republican		Jerome	
27	W.L. Mills	Republican	1950–1951	Canyon	Resigned in 1951 to become secretary to Congressman Hamer Budge
28	R.H. Young, Jr.	Republican	32nd 33rd	Canyon	
29	Elvon Hampton	Republican	34th	Latah	
30	Robert Doolittle	Democratic	35th	Bonner	
31	William Denman Eberle	Republican	36th	Ada	
32	Pete T. Cenarrusa	Republican	37th 38th 39th	Blaine	Resigned in 1967 to serve as the 25th Secretary of State
33	William J. Lanting	Republican	39th 40th 41st 42nd	Twin Falls	
34	Allan F. Larsen	Republican	43rd 44th	Bingham	Republican nominee for Governor in 1978
35	Ralph Olmstead	Republican	45th 46th	Twin Falls	
36	Tom W. Stivers	Republican	47th 48th	Twin Falls	
37	Tom Boyd	Republican	49th 50th 51st	Latah	
38	Mike Simpson	Republican	52nd 53rd 54th	Bingham	Serves as U.S. Congressman for Idaho's 2nd District
39	Bruce Newcomb	Republican	55th 56th 57th 58th	Cassia	
40	Lawerence Denney	Republican	59th 60th 61st	Washington	Served as the 27th Secretary of State
41	Scott Bedke	Republican	62nd 63rd 64th 65th 66th	Cassia	Serves as 44th lieutenant governor
42	Mike Moyle	Republican	67th	Ada	Incumbent

== See also ==
- List of Idaho state legislatures
