= 2014 United States House of Representatives elections in Idaho =

- November 4, 2014

All 2 Idaho seats to the United States House of Representatives
	Majority party	Minority party
Party	Republican	Democratic
Last election	2	0
Seats won	2	0
Seat change	Steady	Steady
Popular vote	275,072	160,078
Percentage	63.21%	36.79%
Swing	▼0.83%	▲4.00%

Republican
50–60%
60–70%
70–80%
80–90%
Democratic
50–60%

The 2014 United States House of Representatives elections in Idaho were held on Tuesday, November 4, 2014, and elected two U.S. representatives, one from each of the state's two congressional districts.

== Overview ==
Results of the 2014 United States House of Representatives elections in Idaho by district:

District	Republican		Democratic		Others		Total		Result
District	Votes	%	Votes	%	Votes	%	Votes	%	Result
District 1	143,580	65.01%	77,277	34.99%	7	0.00%	220,864	100.0%	Republican hold
District 2	131,492	61.36%	82,801	38.64%	0	0.00%	214,293	100.0%	Republican hold
Total	275,072	63.21%	160,078	36.79%	7	0.00%	435,157	100.0%	

== District 1 ==
2010 Idaho's 1st congressional district election
- November 4, 2014
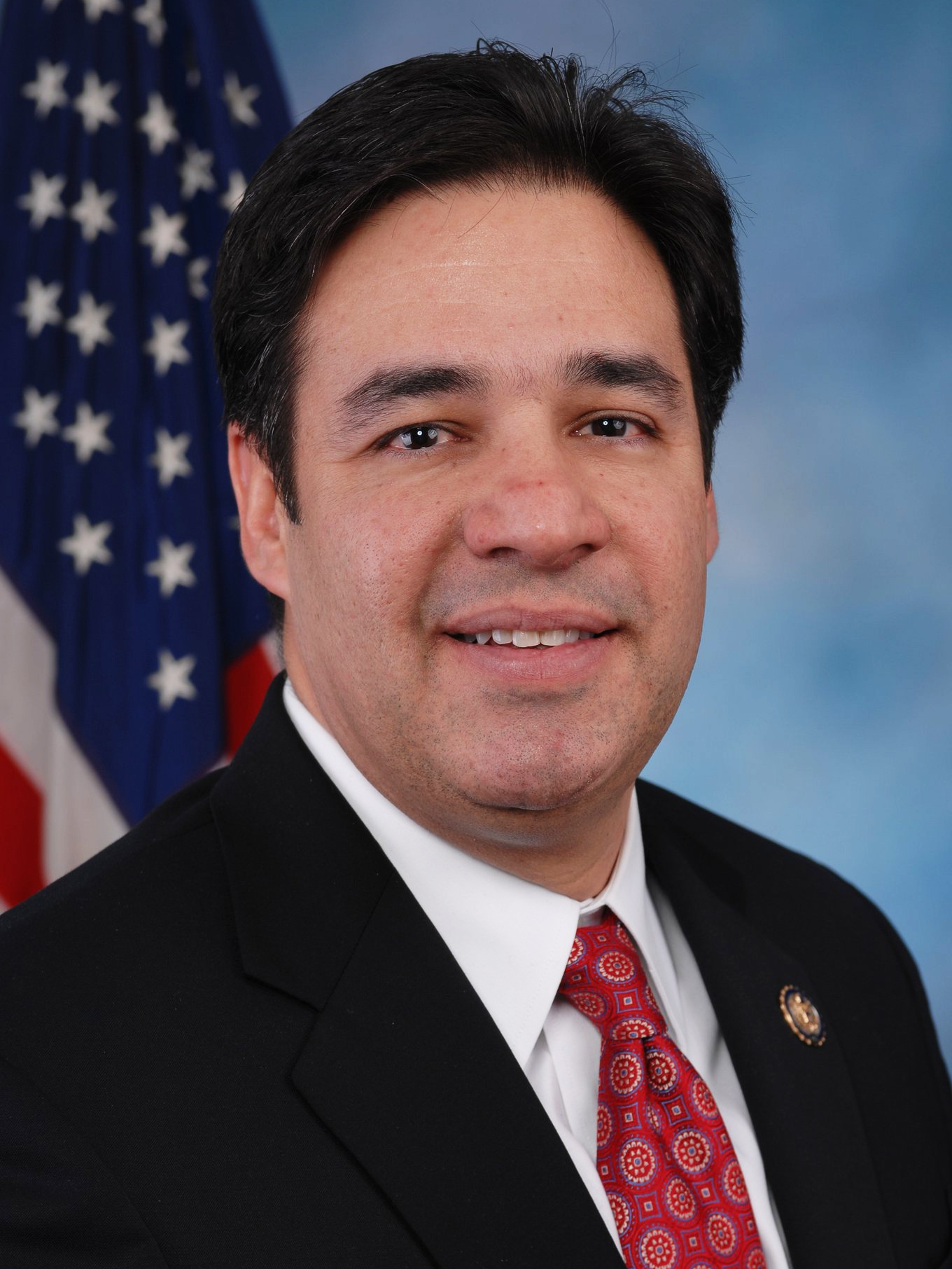

Nominee	Raúl Labrador	Shirley Ringo
Party	Republican	Democratic
Popular vote	143,580	77,277
Percentage	65.0%	35.0%
- County results Labrador: 50–60% 60–70% 70–80% Ringo: 50–60%
U.S. Representative before election
Raúl Labrador
Republican
Elected U.S. Representative
Raúl Labrador
Republican

Republican Raúl Labrador who had represented Idaho's 1st congressional district since 2011, was rumoured to be considering a run for governor in 2014, but announced that he would run for re-election instead. Labrador won election to a second term in 2012, defeating former NFL player Jimmy Farris with 63% of the vote.

=== Republican primary ===
==== Candidates ====
===== Nominee =====
- Raúl Labrador, incumbent U.S. Representative

===== Eliminated in primary =====
- Sean Blackwell
- Lisa Marie
- Michael Greenway
- Reed McCandless, truck driver and candidate for this seat in 2012

==== Primary results ====
Republican primary results
Party	Candidate	Votes	%
Republican	Raúl Labrador (incumbent)	56,206	78.6
Republican	Lisa Marie	5,164	7.2
Republican	Michael Greenway	3,494	4.9
Republican	Reed McCandless	3,373	4.7
Republican	Sean Blackwell	3,304	4.6
Total votes		71,541	100.0

=== Democratic primary ===
==== Candidates ====
===== Nominee =====
- Shirley Ringo, state representative

===== Eliminated in primary =====
- Ryan Barone

===== Declined =====
- Jimmy Farris, former NFL player and nominee for this seat in 2012

==== Primary results ====
Democratic primary results
Party	Candidate	Votes	%
Democratic	Shirley Ringo	9,047	82.0
Democratic	Ryan Barone	1,981	18.0
Total votes		11,028	100.0

=== General election ===
==== Endorsements ====
Shirley Ringo (D)

U.S. Representatives

- Anna Eshoo, U.S. representative from California's 18th congressional district (1993–present)

Labor unions

- AFL-CIO
- American Federation of Teachers
- International Brotherhood of Boilermakers
- National Education Association

Individuals

- Lilly Ledbetter, activist

==== Debates ====
- Complete video of debate, October 9, 2014

==== Predictions ====
Source	Ranking	As of
The Cook Political Report	Safe R	November 3, 2014
Rothenberg	Safe R	October 24, 2014
Sabato's Crystal Ball	Safe R	October 30, 2014
RCP	Safe R	November 2, 2014
Daily Kos Elections	Safe R	November 4, 2014

==== Results ====
Idaho's 1st congressional district, 2014
Party	Candidate	Votes	%
Republican	Raúl Labrador (incumbent)	143,580	65.0
Democratic	Shirley Ringo	77,277	35.0
Republican	Reed McCandless (write-in)	7	0.0
Total votes		220,864	100.0
Republican hold			

== District 2 ==
2014 Idaho's 2nd congressional district election
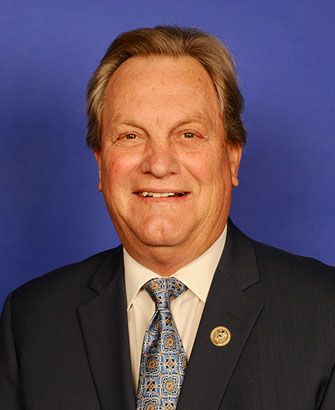

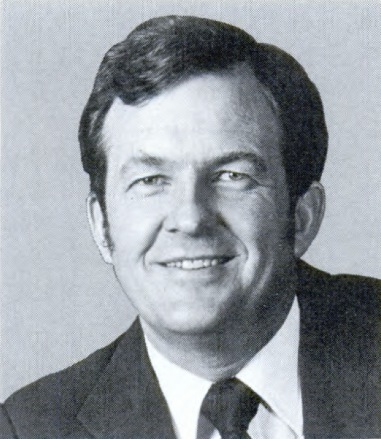
Nominee	Mike Simpson	Richard Stallings
Party	Republican	Democratic
Popular vote	131,492	82,801
Percentage	61.4%	38.6%
- County results Simpson: 50–60% 60–70% 70–80% 80–90% Stallings: 50–60%
U.S. Representative before election
Mike Simpson
Republican
Elected U.S. Representative
Mike Simpson
Republican

Republican Mike Simpson who had represented Idaho's 2nd congressional district since 1999, ran for re-election. Simpson won re-election in 2012, defeating Democratic State Senator Nicole LeFavour with 65% of the vote.

=== Republican primary ===
==== Candidates ====
===== Nominee =====
- Mike Simpson, incumbent U.S. Representative

===== Eliminated in primary =====
- Bryan Smith, attorney

==== Endorsements ====
Mike Simpson

U.S. Representatives

- John Boehner, Speaker of the United States House of Representatives
- Paul Ryan, U.S. Representative (R-WI), Chairman of the House Committee on the Budget and nominee for Vice President of the United States in 2012

Statewide officials

- Mitt Romney, former Governor of Massachusetts, candidate for President in 2008 and nominee for President in 2012

Organizations

- NRA Political Victory Fund
- United States Chamber of Commerce
Bryan Smith

Statewide officials

- Lenore Hardy Barrett, state representative
- Janice McGeachin, former state representative

Organizations

- Citizens United
- Club for Growth
- FreedomWorks
- Madison Project
- National Association for Gun Rights
- Senate Conservatives Fund
- Young Americans for Liberty
Did not endorse

U.S. Representatives

- Raul Labrador, U.S. representative from Idaho's 1st congressional district

==== Primary results ====
Republican primary results
Party	Candidate	Votes	%
Republican	Mike Simpson (incumbent)	48,632	61.6
Republican	Bryan Smith	30,263	38.4
Total votes		78,896	100.0

=== Democratic primary ===
==== Candidates ====
===== Nominee =====
- Richard H. Stallings, former U.S. Representative

==== Primary results ====
Democratic primary results
Party	Candidate	Votes	%
Democratic	Richard H. Stallings	14,547	100.0

=== General election ===
==== Endorsements ====
Mike Simpson (R)

U.S. Representatives

- John Boehner, Speaker of the United States House of Representatives
- Paul Ryan, U.S. Representative (R-WI), Chairman of the House Committee on the Budget and nominee for Vice President of the United States in 2012

Statewide officials

- Mitt Romney, former Governor of Massachusetts, candidate for President in 2008 and nominee for President in 2012

Organizations

- BIPAC
- NRA Political Victory Fund
- United States Chamber of Commerce
Richard Stallings (D)

Labor unions

- International Brotherhood of Boilermakers

==== Predictions ====
Source	Ranking	As of
The Cook Political Report	Safe R	November 3, 2014
Rothenberg	Safe R	October 24, 2014
Sabato's Crystal Ball	Safe R	October 30, 2014
RCP	Safe R	November 2, 2014
Daily Kos Elections	Safe R	November 4, 2014

==== Results ====
Idaho's 2nd congressional district, 2014
Party	Candidate	Votes	%
Republican	Mike Simpson (incumbent)	131,492	61.4
Democratic	Richard Stallings	82,801	38.6
Total votes		214,293	100.0
Republican hold			
