= 2020 United States presidential election in Idaho =

- November 3, 2020
- Turnout: 81.2% (of registered voters) ▲

| Nominee | Donald Trump | Joe Biden |
| Party | Republican | Democratic |
| Home state | Florida | Delaware |
| Running mate | Mike Pence | Kamala Harris |
| Electoral vote | 4 | 0 |
| Popular vote | 554,119 | 287,021 |
| Percentage | 63.84% | 33.07% |

Trump
40–50%
50–60%
60–70%
70–80%
80–90%
90–100%
Biden
40–50%
50–60%
60–70%
70–80%
80–90%
No Data
President before election
Donald Trump
Republican
Elected President
Joe Biden
Democratic

The 2020 United States presidential election in Idaho was held on Tuesday, November 3, 2020, as part of the 2020 United States presidential election in which all 50 states plus the District of Columbia participated. Idaho voters chose electors to represent them in the Electoral College via a popular vote, pitting the Republican Party's nominee, incumbent President Donald Trump, and running mate Vice President Mike Pence against Democratic Party nominee, former Vice President Joe Biden, and his running mate California Senator Kamala Harris. Idaho has four electoral votes in the Electoral College.

Trump easily carried Idaho on Election Day, winning 63.8% of the vote to Biden's 33.1%. Trump's percentage was higher than the 59.2% he received in 2016 due to the lack of third-party voters (namely Evan McMullin of neighboring Utah), but his margin of victory slightly declined, shrinking from 31.8% in 2016 to 30.8% in 2020.

Prior to the election, all news organizations expected Trump to win the state handily. Idaho is one of the most staunchly Republican states in the nation, and has not backed a Democrat for President since 1964, when Lyndon B. Johnson very narrowly carried the state amidst a national landslide.

Trump carried 41 of the state's 44 counties. Biden won Blaine County, home to Sun Valley and several other prime ski resorts; Latah County, home to the college town of Moscow; and flipped Teton County (which had not been won by the Democratic Party since Barack Obama won it in 2008), adjacent to Teton County, Wyoming. Although he did not carry the state's most populous county, Ada County, home to the rapidly growing state capital Boise, which no Democrat has carried since Franklin D. Roosevelt's 1936 landslide, Biden slightly improved on Barack Obama's 2008 result and lost Ada by less than four points. Biden's result of 46.4% and his margin of loss in the county were the highest and lowest for a Democratic presidential nominee since 1940, when Roosevelt won 49% of the county's vote, consequently losing by less than two points.

Per exit polls by the Associated Press, Trump's strength in Idaho came from white voters, especially those in rural areas, who comprised 91% of the electorate and backed Trump by 64%–32%. Trump also received strong support from Caucasian Protestants, who backed him with 71% of their vote.

== Primary elections ==
The primary elections were on March 10, 2020.

=== Republican primary ===
Incumbent United States President Donald Trump was challenged by five candidates: businessman and perennial candidate Rocky De La Fuente of California, entrepreneur and investor Bob Ely of Massachusetts, entrepreneur and attorney Matthew Matern of Louisiana, former congressman Joe Walsh of Illinois, and former governor Bill Weld of Massachusetts. Walsh withdrew from the race prior to the primary.

2020 Idaho Republican presidential primary
| Candidate | Votes | % | Estimated delegates |
|---|---|---|---|
| Donald Trump (incumbent) | 112,373 | 94.46% | 32 |
| Bill Weld | 2,486 | 2.09% | 0 |
| Joe Walsh (withdrawn) | 2,341 | 1.97% | 0 |
| Matthew Matern | 647 | 0.54% | 0 |
| Rocky De La Fuente | 637 | 0.54% | 0 |
| Bob Ely | 474 | 0.40% | 0 |
| Total | 118,311 | 100% | 32 |

=== Democratic primary ===
Bernie Sanders, Joe Biden, and Tulsi Gabbard were the major declared candidates.

Results by county Biden—40–50% Biden—50–60% Biden—60–70% Sanders—40–50% Sanders—50–60% Tie—30–40%

2020 Idaho Democratic presidential primary
| Candidate | Votes | % | Delegates |
|---|---|---|---|
| Joe Biden | 53,151 | 48.92 | 12 |
| Bernie Sanders | 46,114 | 42.44 | 8 |
| Elizabeth Warren (withdrawn) (Note: Candidate withdrew during early voting following Super Tuesday.) | 2,878 | 2.65 | |
| Michael Bloomberg (withdrawn) | 2,612 | 2.40 | |
| Pete Buttigieg (withdrawn) (Note: Candidate withdrew during early voting before Super Tuesday.) | 1,426 | 1.31 | |
| Tulsi Gabbard | 876 | 0.81 | |
| Amy Klobuchar (withdrawn) | 774 | 0.71 | |
| Andrew Yang (withdrawn) | 310 | 0.29 | |
| Tom Steyer (withdrawn) | 112 | 0.10 | |
| Michael Bennet (withdrawn) | 91 | 0.08 | |
| John Delaney (withdrawn) | 65 | 0.06 | |
| Marianne Williamson (withdrawn) | 57 | 0.05 | |
| Cory Booker (withdrawn) | 55 | 0.05 | |
| Julian Castro (withdrawn) | 49 | 0.05 | |
| Deval Patrick (withdrawn) | 19 | 0.02 | |
| Other candidates | 60 | 0.06 | |
| Total | 108,649 | 100% | 20 |

== General election ==
=== Predictions ===
| Source | Ranking | As of |
|---|---|---|
| The Cook Political Report | Safe R | November 3, 2020 |
| Inside Elections | Safe R | November 3, 2020 |
| Sabato's Crystal Ball | Safe R | November 3, 2020 |
| Politico | Safe R | November 3, 2020 |
| RCP | Safe R | November 3, 2020 |
| Niskanen | Safe R | November 3, 2020 |
| CNN | Safe R | November 3, 2020 |
| The Economist | Safe R | November 3, 2020 |
| CBS News | Likely R | November 3, 2020 |
| 270towin | Safe R | November 3, 2020 |
| ABC News | Safe R | November 3, 2020 |
| NPR | Likely R | November 3, 2020 |
| NBC News | Safe R | November 3, 2020 |
| 538 | Safe R | November 3, 2020 |

=== Polling ===
View source data.

==== Aggregate polls ====
| Source of poll aggregation | Dates administered | Dates updated | Joe Biden Democratic | Donald Trump Republican | Other/ Undecided (Note: Calculated by taking the difference of 100% and all other candidates combined.) | Margin |
|---|---|---|---|---|---|---|
| FiveThirtyEight | until November 2, 2020 | November 3, 2020 | 38.5% | 56.6% | 4.9% | Trump +18.1 |

==== Polls ====
| Poll source | Date(s) administered | Sample size (Note: Key: A – all adults RV – registered voters LV – likely voters V – unclear) | Margin of error | Donald Trump Republican | Joe Biden Democratic | Jo Jorgensen Libertarian | Other | Undecided |
|---|---|---|---|---|---|---|---|---|
| SurveyMonkey/Axios | Oct 20 – Nov 2, 2020 | 909 (LV) | ± 4.5% | 58% (Note: Overlapping sample with the previous SurveyMonkey/Axios poll, but more information available regarding sample size) | 40% | - | – | – |
| SurveyMonkey/Axios | Oct 1–28, 2020 | 1,799 (LV) | – | 58% | 40% | - | – | – |
| SurveyMonkey/Axios | Sep 1–30, 2020 | 761 (LV) | – | 64% | 35% | - | – | 1% |
| Spry Strategies/Women's Liberation Front | Aug 29 – Sep 1, 2020 | 600 (LV) | ± 4% | 60% | 34% | - | – | 6% |
| SurveyMonkey/Axios | Aug 1–31, 2020 | 737 (LV) | – | 58% | 40% | - | – | 2% |
| SurveyMonkey/Axios | Jul 1–31, 2020 | 671 (LV) | – | 63% | 35% | - | – | 2% |
| SurveyMonkey/Axios | Jun 8–30, 2020 | 266 (LV) | – | 58% | 41% | - | – | 1% |

=== Electoral slates ===
These slates of electors were nominated by each party in order to vote in the Electoral College should their candidate win the state:

| Donald Trump and Mike Pence Republican Party | Joe Biden and Kamala Harris Democratic Party | Jo Jorgensen and Spike Cohen Libertarian Party | Kanye West and Michelle Tidball Independent | Brock Pierce and Karla Ballard Independent | Don Blankenship and William Mohr Constitution Party | Rocky De La Fuente and Darcy Richardson Independent |
|---|---|---|---|---|---|---|
| Rod Beck; Raul Labrador; Janice McGeachin; Melinda Smyser | Cherie Buckner-Webb; Maryanne Jordan; Elaine Smith; Mary Lou Reed | Elizabeth Clark; Dan Karlan; Aaron Mason; Cathy Smith | Ryan Andrew Fauvell; Julia Hurst; Adriel Martinez; Megan Shoemaker | Zachary Todd Hanna; Terrel Hill; Christopher Kreighbaum; Ryan Lyden | Brendan Gomez; David Hartigan; Tony Ullrich; Ray Writz | Nick Carannante; Tim Guy; Shawn Satterthwaite; Daryl Yandell |

=== Results ===
2020 United States presidential election in Idaho
| Party | Candidate | Votes | % | ±% |
|---|---|---|---|---|
| Republican | Donald Trump (incumbent) Mike Pence (incumbent) | 554,119 | 63.84% | +4.58 |
| Democratic | Joe Biden Kamala Harris | 287,021 | 33.07% | +5.60 |
| Libertarian | Jo Jorgensen Spike Cohen | 16,404 | 1.89% | −2.21 |
| Independent | Kanye West Michelle Tidball | 3,632 | 0.42% | +0.42 |
| Independent | Brock Pierce Karla Ballard | 2,808 | 0.32% | +0.32 |
| Constitution | Don Blankenship William Mohr | 1,806 | 0.22% | −0.12 |
| Independent | Rocky De La Fuente Darcy Richardson | 1,491 | 0.17% | −0.03 |
| Green | Howie Hawkins (write-in) Angela Walker (write-in) | 407 | 0.05% | −1.17 |
| American Solidarity | Brian Carroll (write-in) Amar Patel (write-in) | 163 | 0.02% | N/A |
| Socialism and Liberation | Gloria La Riva (write-in) Sunil Freeman (write-in) | 49 | 0.01% | N/A |
| Independent | Jade Simmons (write-in) Claudeliah Roze (write-in) | 21 | 0.00% | N/A |
| Independent | Other (write-in) | 13 | 0.00% | N/A |
| Total votes | | 867,934 | 100.00% | |

==== By county ====
| County | Donald Trump Republican | | Joe Biden Democratic | | Various candidates Other parties | | Margin | | Total |
| County | # | % | # | % | # | % | # | % | Total |
|---|---|---|---|---|---|---|---|---|---|
| Ada | 130,699 | 49.98% | 120,539 | 46.10% | 10,250 | 3.92% | 10,160 | 3.88% | 261,488 |
| Adams | 1,941 | 75.06% | 591 | 22.85% | 54 | 2.09% | 1,350 | 52.21% | 2,586 |
| Bannock | 23,331 | 58.65% | 14,682 | 36.91% | 1,770 | 4.44% | 8,649 | 21.74% | 39,783 |
| Bear Lake | 2,914 | 87.88% | 350 | 10.55% | 52 | 1.57% | 2,564 | 77.33% | 3,316 |
| Benewah | 3,878 | 77.95% | 977 | 19.64% | 120 | 2.41% | 2,901 | 58.31% | 4,975 |
| Bingham | 15,295 | 76.49% | 4,124 | 20.62% | 577 | 2.89% | 11,171 | 55.87% | 19,996 |
| Blaine | 4,032 | 30.32% | 8,919 | 67.08% | 346 | 2.60% | -4,887 | -36.78% | 13,297 |
| Boise | 3,485 | 72.27% | 1,204 | 24.97% | 133 | 2.76% | 2,281 | 47.30% | 4,822 |
| Bonner | 18,369 | 67.16% | 8,310 | 30.38% | 673 | 2.46% | 10,059 | 36.78% | 27,352 |
| Bonneville | 37,805 | 69.97% | 14,254 | 26.38% | 1,975 | 3.65% | 23,551 | 43.59% | 54,034 |
| Boundary | 4,937 | 78.15% | 1,220 | 19.31% | 160 | 2.54% | 3,717 | 58.84% | 6,317 |
| Butte | 1,202 | 84.95% | 188 | 13.29% | 25 | 1.76% | 1,014 | 71.66% | 1,415 |
| Camas | 507 | 75.22% | 149 | 22.11% | 18 | 2.67% | 358 | 53.11% | 674 |
| Canyon | 61,759 | 68.27% | 25,881 | 28.61% | 2,817 | 3.12% | 35,878 | 39.66% | 90,457 |
| Caribou | 2,906 | 85.07% | 431 | 12.62% | 79 | 2.31% | 2,475 | 72.45% | 3,416 |
| Cassia | 7,907 | 82.09% | 1,464 | 15.20% | 261 | 2.71% | 6,443 | 66.89% | 9,632 |
| Clark | 264 | 84.89% | 41 | 13.18% | 6 | 1.93% | 223 | 71.71% | 311 |
| Clearwater | 3,453 | 78.14% | 877 | 19.85% | 89 | 2.01% | 2,576 | 58.29% | 4,419 |
| Custer | 2,089 | 76.27% | 603 | 22.02% | 47 | 1.71% | 1,486 | 54.25% | 2,739 |
| Elmore | 7,246 | 70.95% | 2,601 | 25.47% | 366 | 3.58% | 4,645 | 45.48% | 10,213 |
| Franklin | 5,845 | 87.71% | 657 | 9.86% | 162 | 2.43% | 5,188 | 77.85% | 6,664 |
| Fremont | 5,548 | 82.55% | 998 | 14.85% | 175 | 2.60% | 4,550 | 67.70% | 6,721 |
| Gem | 7,951 | 79.65% | 1,803 | 18.06% | 229 | 2.29% | 6,148 | 61.59% | 9,983 |
| Gooding | 4,659 | 76.98% | 1,256 | 20.75% | 137 | 2.27% | 3,403 | 56.23% | 6,052 |
| Idaho | 7,826 | 81.44% | 1,561 | 16.24% | 223 | 2.32% | 6,265 | 65.20% | 9,610 |
| Jefferson | 12,099 | 85.32% | 1,661 | 11.71% | 420 | 2.97% | 10,438 | 73.61% | 14,180 |
| Jerome | 5,734 | 73.14% | 1,893 | 24.15% | 213 | 2.71% | 3,841 | 48.99% | 7,840 |
| Kootenai | 62,837 | 69.91% | 24,312 | 27.05% | 2,729 | 3.04% | 38,525 | 42.86% | 89,878 |
| Latah | 9,472 | 45.96% | 10,236 | 49.67% | 902 | 4.37% | -764 | -3.61% | 20,610 |
| Lemhi | 3,592 | 75.80% | 1,032 | 21.78% | 115 | 2.42% | 2,560 | 54.02% | 4,739 |
| Lewis | 1,489 | 79.63% | 349 | 18.66% | 32 | 1.71% | 1,140 | 60.97% | 1,870 |
| Lincoln | 1,469 | 75.68% | 414 | 21.33% | 58 | 2.99% | 1,055 | 54.35% | 1,941 |
| Madison | 13,559 | 79.12% | 2,666 | 15.56% | 912 | 5.32% | 10,893 | 63.56% | 17,137 |
| Minidoka | 6,265 | 78.38% | 1,550 | 19.39% | 178 | 2.23% | 4,715 | 58.99% | 7,993 |
| Nez Perce | 13,738 | 65.47% | 6,686 | 31.86% | 561 | 2.67% | 7,052 | 33.61% | 20,985 |
| Oneida | 2,148 | 87.60% | 249 | 10.15% | 55 | 2.25% | 1,899 | 77.45% | 2,452 |
| Owyhee | 3,819 | 80.52% | 816 | 17.20% | 108 | 2.28% | 3,003 | 63.32% | 4,743 |
| Payette | 8,862 | 78.47% | 2,161 | 19.14% | 270 | 2.39% | 6,701 | 59.33% | 11,293 |
| Power | 2,116 | 68.57% | 865 | 28.03% | 105 | 3.40% | 1,251 | 40.54% | 3,086 |
| Shoshone | 4,216 | 69.70% | 1,693 | 27.99% | 140 | 2.31% | 2,523 | 41.71% | 6,049 |
| Teton | 2,858 | 44.92% | 3,318 | 52.15% | 186 | 2.93% | -460 | -7.23% | 6,362 |
| Twin Falls | 25,897 | 70.93% | 9,391 | 25.72% | 1,224 | 3.35% | 16,506 | 45.21% | 36,512 |
| Valley | 3,947 | 55.88% | 2,976 | 42.14% | 140 | 1.98% | 971 | 13.74% | 7,063 |
| Washington | 4,154 | 77.70% | 1,073 | 20.07% | 119 | 2.23% | 3,081 | 57.63% | 5,346 |
| Totals | 554,119 | 63.67% | 287,021 | 32.98% | 29,211 | 3.25% | 267,098 | 30.69% | 870,351 |

Counties that flipped from Republican to Democratic

- Teton (largest municipality: Victor)

==== By congressional district ====
Trump won both congressional districts.

| District | Trump | Biden | Representative |
|---|---|---|---|
| 1st | 67% | 30% | Russ Fulcher |
| 2nd | 60% | 37% | Mike Simpson |

== See also ==
- United States presidential elections in Idaho
- Presidency of Joe Biden
- 2020 Idaho elections
- 2020 United States presidential election
- 2020 Democratic Party presidential primaries
- 2020 Republican Party presidential primaries
- 2020 United States elections
