= United States House Appropriations Subcommittee on Energy and Water Development and Related Agencies =

Subcommittee of Committee on Appropriations
- Active United States House of Representatives; 119th Congress

Leadership
- Chair: Chuck Fleischmann (R)
- Ranking Member: Marcy Kaptur (D)

Structure
- Seats: 15 (15 currently filled) 9/9 6/6
- Political parties: Majority (9): Republican (9); Minority (6): Democratic (6)

Meeting place
- 2362B, Rayburn House Office Building; Washington, D.C. 20515

Phone number
- (202)-225-3421

The House Subcommittee on Energy and Water Development, and Related Agencies is a standing subcommittee within the House Appropriations Committee. The United States House Committee on Appropriations has joint jurisdiction with the United States Senate Committee on Appropriations over all appropriations bills in the United States Congress. Each committee has 12 matching subcommittees, each of which is tasked with working on one of the twelve annual regular appropriations bills. This subcommittee has jurisdiction over the budget for the United States Department of Energy and Water Development.

The committee is chaired by Republican Chuck Fleischmann and its Ranking Member is Democrat Marcy Kaptur.

== Appropriations process ==
Traditionally, after a federal budget for the upcoming fiscal year has been passed, the appropriations subcommittees receive information about what the budget sets as their spending ceilings. This is called "302(b) allocations" after section 302(b) of the Congressional Budget Act of 1974. That amount is separated into smaller amounts for each of the twelve Subcommittees. The federal budget does not become law and is not signed by the President. Instead, it is guide for the House and the Senate in making appropriations and tax decisions. However, no budget is required and each chamber has procedures in place for what to do without one. The House and Senate now consider appropriations bills simultaneously, although originally the House went first. The House Committee on Appropriations usually reports the appropriations bills in May and June and the Senate in June. Any differences between appropriations bills passed by the House and the Senate are resolved in the fall.

== Appropriations bills ==
An appropriations bill is a bill that appropriates (gives to, sets aside for) money to specific federal government departments, agencies, and programs. The money provides funding for operations, personnel, equipment, and activities. Regular appropriations bills are passed annually, with the funding they provide covering one fiscal year. The fiscal year is the accounting period of the federal government, which runs from October 1 to September 30 of the following year.

There are three types of appropriations bills: regular appropriations bills, continuing resolutions, and supplemental appropriations bills. Regular appropriations bills are the twelve standard bills that cover the funding for the federal government for one fiscal year and that are supposed to be enacted into law by October 1. If Congress has not enacted the regular appropriations bills by the time, it can pass a continuing resolution, which continues the pre-existing appropriations at the same levels as the previous fiscal year (or with minor modifications) for a set amount of time. The third type of appropriations bills are supplemental appropriations bills, which add additional funding above and beyond what was originally appropriated at the beginning of the fiscal year. Supplemental appropriations bills can be used for things like disaster relief.

Appropriations bills are one part of a larger United States budget and spending process. They are preceded in that process by the president's budget proposal, congressional budget resolutions, and the 302(b) allocation. Article One of the United States Constitution, section 9, clause 7, states that "No money shall be drawn from the Treasury, but in Consequence of Appropriations made by Law..." This is what gives Congress the power to make these appropriations. The President, however, still has the power to veto appropriations bills.

== Members, 119th Congress ==
Majority	Minority
Chuck Fleischmann, Tennessee, Chair; Mike Simpson, Idaho; Ken Calvert, California; Dan Newhouse, Washington; Guy Reschenthaler, Pennsylvania; Michael Guest, Mississippi; Michael Cloud, Texas, Vice Chair; Scott Franklin, Florida; Celeste Maloy, Utah	Marcy Kaptur, Ohio, Ranking Member; James Clyburn, South Carolina; Debbie Wasserman Schultz, Florida; Mike Levin, California; Frank J. Mrvan, Indiana; Susie Lee, Nevada
Ex officio
Tom Cole, Oklahoma	Rosa DeLauro, Connecticut

== Historical subcommittee rosters ==
=== 115th Congress ===
Majority	Minority
Mike Simpson, Idaho, Chairman; Ken Calvert, California; Chuck Fleischmann, Tennessee, Vice Chair; Jeff Fortenberry, Nebraska; Kay Granger, Texas; Jaime Herrera Beutler, Washington; David Joyce, Ohio; Dan Newhouse, Washington	Marcy Kaptur, Ohio, Ranking Member; Pete Visclosky, Indiana; Debbie Wasserman Schultz, Florida; Pete Aguilar, California; José E. Serrano, New York
Ex officio
Rodney Frelinghuysen, New Jersey	Nita Lowey, New York

=== 116th Congress ===
Majority	Minority
Marcy Kaptur, Ohio, Chair; Pete Visclosky, Indiana, Vice Chair; Debbie Wasserman Schultz, Florida; Ann Kirkpatrick, Arizona; Derek Kilmer, Washington; Mark Pocan, Wisconsin; Lois Frankel, Florida	Mike Simpson, Idaho, Ranking Member; Ken Calvert, California; Chuck Fleischmann, Tennessee; Dan Newhouse, Washington
Ex officio
Nita Lowey, New York	Kay Granger, Texas

=== 117th Congress ===
Majority	Minority
Marcy Kaptur, Ohio, Chair; Debbie Wasserman Schultz, Florida, Vice Chair; Ann Kirkpatrick, Arizona; Susie Lee, Nevada; Tim Ryan, Ohio; Derek Kilmer, Washington; Lois Frankel, Florida; Cheri Bustos, Illinois	Mike Simpson, Idaho, Ranking Member; Ken Calvert, California; Chuck Fleischmann, Tennessee; Dan Newhouse, Washington; Jaime Herrera Beutler, Washington; Guy Reschenthaler, Pennsylvania
Ex officio
Rosa DeLauro, Connecticut	Kay Granger, Texas

=== 118th Congress ===
Majority	Minority
Chuck Fleischmann, Tennessee, Chair; Mike Simpson, Idaho; Ken Calvert, California; Dan Newhouse, Washington; Guy Reschenthaler, Pennsylvania; Mike Garcia, California; Julia Letlow, Louisiana; Michael Guest, Mississippi	Marcy Kaptur, Ohio, Ranking Member; Debbie Wasserman Schultz, Florida; Susie Lee, Nevada; Mike Quigley, Illinois; Joe Morelle, New York; Derek Kilmer, Washington
Ex officio
Kay Granger, Texas	Rosa DeLauro, Connecticut
