= Cameron Sheffield =

American football player (born 1988)

No. 55
- Position: Defensive end

Personal information
- Born: February 12, 1988 (age 38); Portal, Georgia, U.S.
- Listed height: 6 ft 3 in (1.91 m)
- Listed weight: 256 lb (116 kg)

Career information
- High school: Portal (GA)
- College: Troy
- NFL draft: 2010: 5th round, 142nd overall pick

Career history
- Kansas City Chiefs (2010−2012); Dallas Cowboys (2013)*; Edmonton Eskimos (2014)
- * Offseason or practice squad member only

Awards and highlights
- First-team All-Sun Belt (2008); Second-team All-Sun Belt (2009)

Career NFL statistics
- Total tackles: 9
- Stats at Pro Football Reference

Cameron Corley Sheffield (born February 12, 1988) is an American former professional football player who was a defensive end in the National Football League (NFL) and Canadian Football League (CFL). He was selected by the Kansas City Chiefs in the fifth round of the 2010 NFL draft with the 142nd overall pick. He played college football for the Troy Trojans.

== Professional career ==
Sheffield missed the 2010 NFL season with a neck injury sustained in a tackle with Mike Bell of the Philadelphia Eagles during the preseason.

On August 1, 2013, Sheffield was waived/injured by the Dallas Cowboys. He cleared waivers and was placed on the injured reserve list. On August 7, 2013, Sheffield was released by the team with an injury settlement.

Sheffield signed with the Edmonton Eskimos on April 8, 2014.
