= 2016 United States House of Representatives elections in Idaho =

- November 8, 2016

All 2 Idaho seats to the United States House of Representatives
	Majority party	Minority party
Party	Republican	Democratic
Last election	2	0
Seats won	2	0
Seat change	Steady	Steady
Popular vote	447,544	208,992
Percentage	65.66%	30.66%
Swing	▲2.45%	▼6.13%

Republican
50–60%
60–70%
70–80%
80–90%
Democratic
50–60%

The United States House of Representatives elections in Idaho occurred on November 8, 2016. The state chose two individuals to represent Idaho in the U.S. House. Idaho's voting system is a mixed primary system. The Democratic Party permits unaffiliated voters to vote in the primary. The Republican Party grants registered voters the right to vote. Non-affiliated electors can choose to ally with a party on election day, however, they will be obligated to that party at the next election. The primaries were held on May 17.

== District 1 ==
2016 Idaho's 1st congressional district election
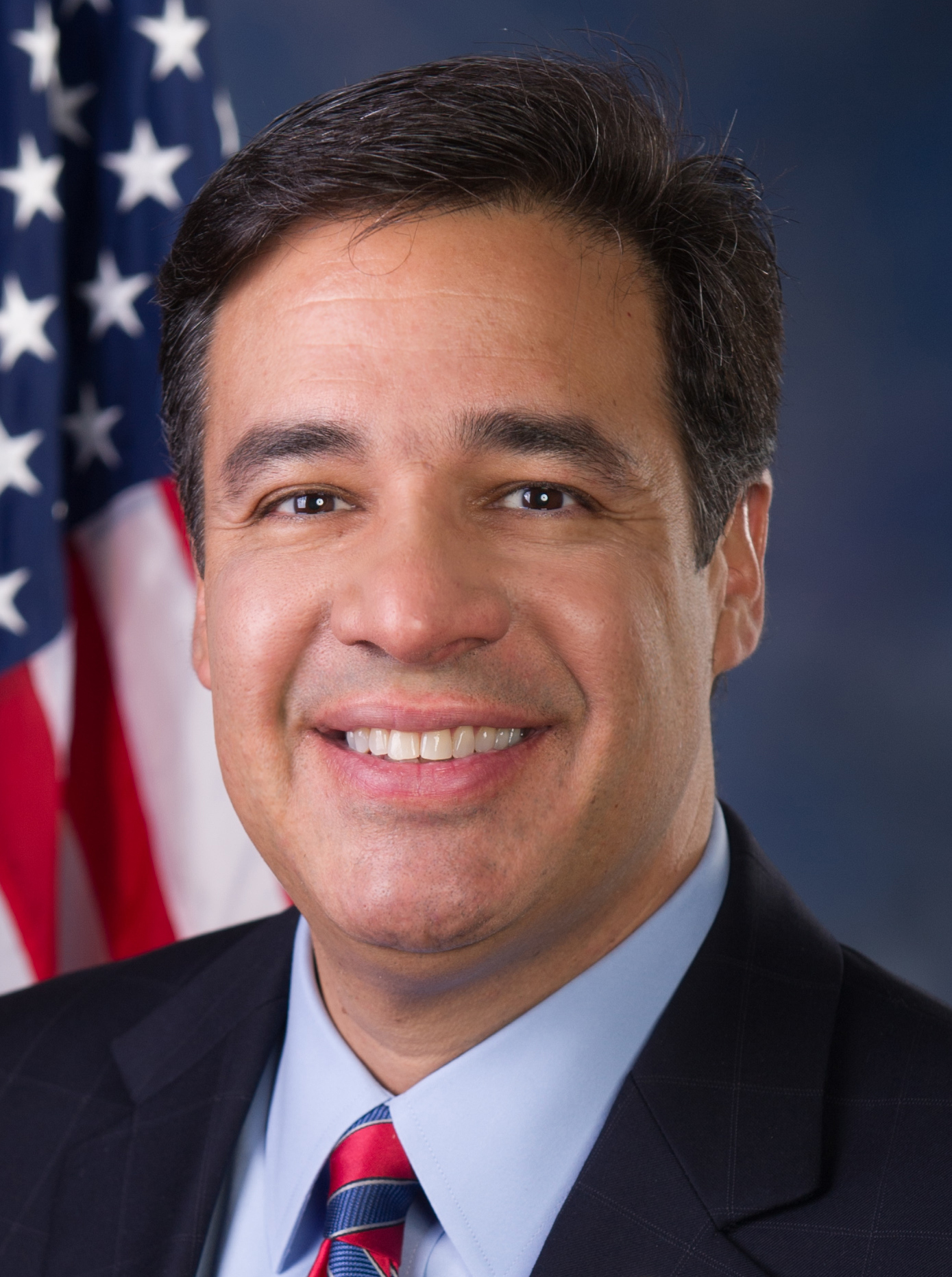

Nominee	Raúl Labrador	James Piotrowski
Party	Republican	Democratic
Popular vote	242,252	113,052
Percentage	68.2%	31.8%
- Precinct results Labrador: 50–60% 60–70% 70–80% 80–90% >90% Piotrowski 50–60% 60–70% Tie: 50% No votes
U.S. Representatives before election
Raúl Labrador
Republican
Elected U.S. Representatives
Raúl Labrador
Republican

Republican Raúl Labrador has represented Idaho's 1st congressional district since 2011. Labrador won election to a third term in 2014, defeating State Representative Shirley Ringo of Moscow with 65% of the vote.

=== Republican primary ===
==== Results ====
Republican primary results
Party	Candidate	Votes	%
Republican	Raul Labrador (incumbent)	51,568	81.0
Republican	Gordon Counsil	6,510	10.2
Republican	Isaac M. Haugen	5,605	8.8
Total votes		63,683	100.0

=== Democratic primary ===
==== Results ====
Democratic primary results
Party	Candidate	Votes	%
Democratic	James Piotrowski	6,954	56.2
Democratic	Shizandra Fox	3,428	27.7
Democratic	Staniela Nikolova	2,002	16.1
Total votes		12,384	100.0

=== General election ===
==== Predictions ====
Source	Ranking	As of
The Cook Political Report	Safe R	November 7, 2016
Daily Kos Elections	Safe R	November 7, 2016
Rothenberg	Safe R	November 3, 2016
Sabato's Crystal Ball	Safe R	November 7, 2016
RCP	Safe R	October 31, 2016

==== Results ====
Idaho's 1st congressional district, 2016
Party	Candidate	Votes	%
Republican	Raul Labrador (incumbent)	242,252	68.2
Democratic	James Piotrowski	113,052	31.8
n/a	Write-ins	53	0.0
Total votes		355,357	100.0
Republican hold			

== District 2 ==
2016 Idaho's 2nd congressional district election
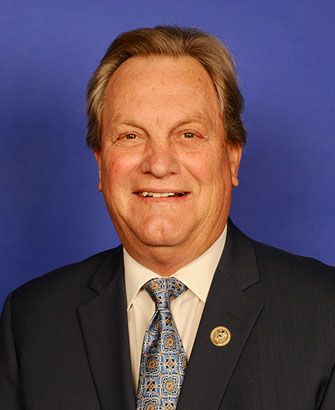

Nominee	Mike Simpson	Jennifer Martinez
Party	Republican	Democratic
Popular vote	205,292	95,940
Percentage	62.9%	29.4%
- Precinct results Simpson: 40–50% 50–60% 60–70% 70–80% 80–90% >90% Martinez 40–50% 50–60% 60–70% No votes
U.S. Representatives before election
Mike Simpson
Republican
Elected U.S. Representatives
Mike Simpson
Republican

Republican Mike Simpson has represented Idaho's 2nd congressional district since 1999. Simpson won reelection in 2014, defeating former Congressman Richard H. Stallings with 61% of the vote.

=== Republican primary ===
==== Results ====
Republican primary results
Party	Candidate	Votes	%
Republican	Mike Simpson (incumbent)	47,116	73.0
Republican	Lisa Marie	17,442	27.0
Total votes		64,558	100.0

=== Democratic primary ===
==== Results ====
Democratic primary results
Party	Candidate	Votes	%
Democratic	Jennifer Martinez	13,816	100.0
Total votes		13,816	100.0

=== Constitution primary ===
==== Results ====
Constitution primary results
Party	Candidate	Votes	%
Constitution	Anthony Tomkins	82	100.0
Total votes		82	100.0

=== General election ===
==== Predictions ====
Source	Ranking	As of
The Cook Political Report	Safe R	November 7, 2016
Daily Kos Elections	Safe R	November 7, 2016
Rothenberg	Safe R	November 3, 2016
Sabato's Crystal Ball	Safe R	November 7, 2016
RCP	Safe R	October 31, 2016

==== Results ====
Idaho's 2nd congressional district, 2016
Party	Candidate	Votes	%
Republican	Mike Simpson (incumbent)	205,292	62.9
Democratic	Jennifer Martinez	95,940	29.4
Constitution	Anthony Tomkins	25,005	7.7
Total votes		326,237	100.0
Republican hold			

== See also ==
- United States House of Representatives elections, 2016
- United States Senate election in Idaho, 2016
