= Ruby Stone =

American politician from Idaho

Member of the Idaho House of Representatives from District 17 Seat B
- In office January 1986 – November 30, 2002
- Preceded by: Harry Stone
- Succeeded by: Janet Miller

Personal details
- Born: February 6, 1924 Portal, Georgia, U.S.
- Died: May 1, 2013 (aged 89) Boise, Idaho, U.S.
- Party: Republican
- Spouse: Harry Stone (died 1986)

Ruby Aline Stone (née Rocker) (February 6, 1924 – May 1, 2013) was an American politician.

Born in Portal, Georgia, Stone went to Dickinson's Secretarial and Business School. She worked as an office manager, and in real estate. She also worked for the Idaho Legislature as an aide. Stone was appointed to the Idaho House of Representatives from Boise, Idaho succeeding her husband. She was later elected and served until her retirement in 2002. She was a Republican, although she often broke with her party on women's issues.

As a golfer and official, she was inducted into the Idaho Sports Hall of Fame. She died in Boise, Idaho.
