= Portal, Georgia =

- Town
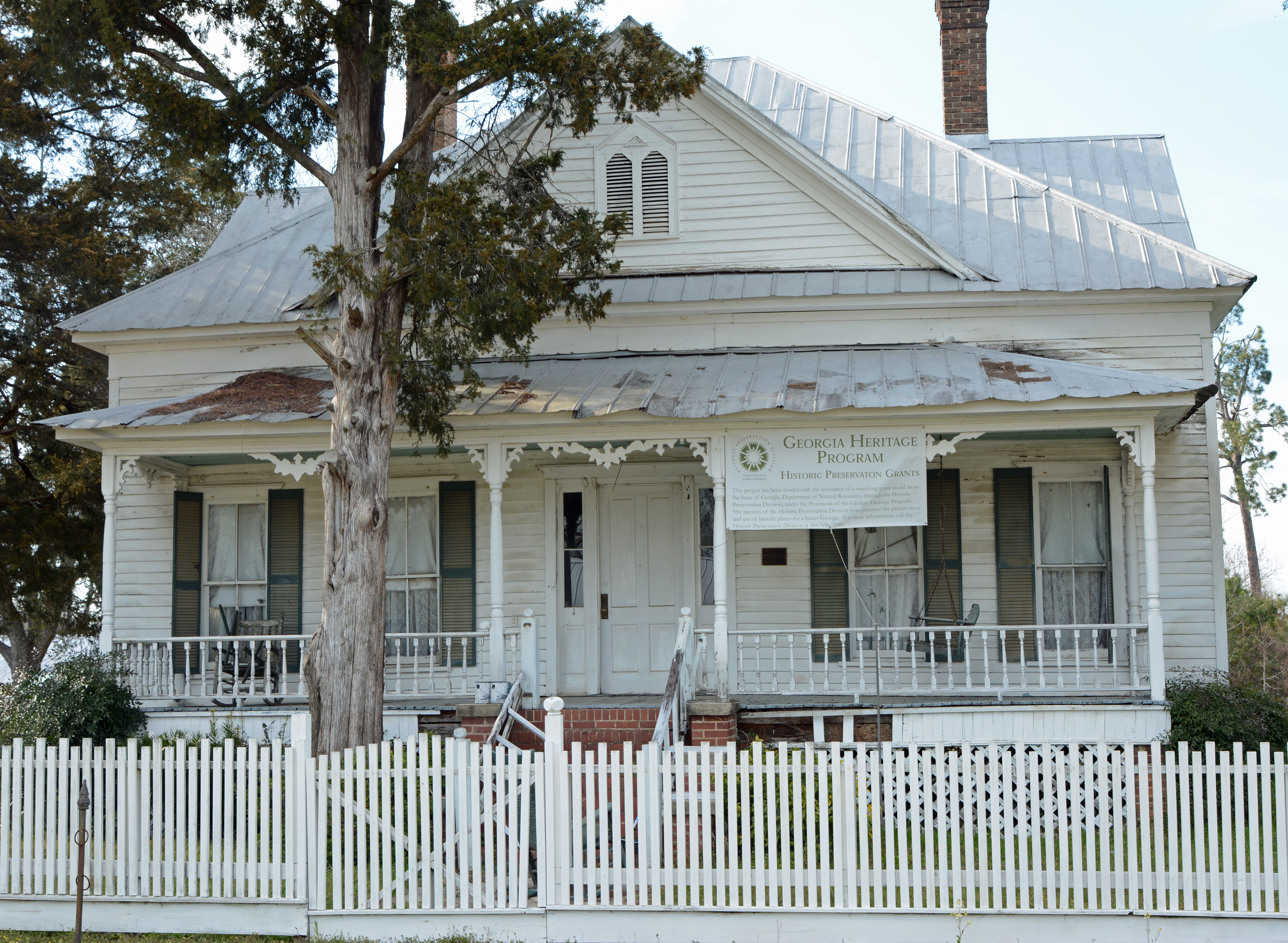
- Dr. James A. Stewart House in Portal

- Location in Bulloch County and the state of Georgia
- Coordinates: 32°32′14″N 81°55′54″W
- Country: United States
- State: Georgia
- County: Bulloch

Area
  - Total: 2.07 sq mi (5.35 km^{2})
  - Land: 2.00 sq mi (5.18 km^{2})
  - Water: 0.066 sq mi (0.17 km^{2})
- Elevation: 300 ft (90 m)

Population (2026)
  - Total: 705
  - Density: 333.6/sq mi (128.82/km^{2})
- Time zone: UTC-5 (Eastern (EST))
  - Summer (DST): UTC-4 (EDT)
- ZIP code: 30450-5020
- Area code: 912
- FIPS code: 13-62216
- GNIS feature ID: 0332735

Portal is a town in Bulloch County, Georgia, United States. The population was 638 in 2020.

== History ==
The Georgia General Assembly incorporated Portal as a town in 1914. It is unknown why the name "Portal" was applied to this place.

== Geography ==
Portal is located at 32°32′14″N 81°55′54″W (32.537275, -81.931738). According to the United States Census Bureau, the town has a total area of 2.2 square miles (5.6 km^{2}), of which 2.1 square miles (5.5 km^{2}) is land and 0.077 square miles (0.2 km^{2}), or 2.99%, is water.

== Demographics ==
Historical population
Census	Pop.	Note	%±
1930	374		—
1940	556		48.7%
1950	532		−4.3%
1960	494		−7.1%
1970	643		30.2%
1980	694		7.9%
1990	522		−24.8%
2000	597		14.4%
2010	638		6.9%
2020	638		0.0%
U.S. Decennial Census

As of the census of 2000, there were 597 people, 232 households, and 167 families residing in the town. By 2020, its population increased to 638, experiencing no population change from 2010.

== Notable people ==
- Brooks Brown (1985-), American professional baseball pitcher for the Colorado Rockies of Major League Baseball (MLB). Brown attended Portal High School.
- Dr. Leila Denmark (1898–2012), pediatrician, author and researcher who blazed trails for women in medicine, and lived to be 114
- Cameron Sheffield (born 1988), American football defensive end. He was drafted by the Kansas City Chiefs in the fifth round of the 2010 NFL draft.
- Ruby Stone (1924–2013), born in Portal and later moved to Idaho, where she became a politician and was elected as a state legislator.
