= H.R. 4283 (113th Congress) =

- Long title: To amend the Wild and Scenic Rivers Act to authorize the Secretary of the Interior to maintain or replace certain facilities and structures for commercial recreation services at Smith Gulch in Idaho, and for other purposes.
- Announced in: the 113th United States Congress
- Sponsored by: Rep. Michael K. Simpson (R, ID-2)
- Number of co-sponsors: 0

Codification
- U.S.C. sections affected: 16 U.S.C. § 1132, 16 U.S.C. § 1274
- Agencies affected: United States Department of the Interior

Legislative history
- Introduced in the House as H.R. 4283 by Rep. Michael K. Simpson (R, ID-2) on March 21, 2014; Committee consideration by United States House Committee on Natural Resources, United States House Natural Resources Subcommittee on Public Lands and Environmental Regulation; Passed the House on September 8, 2014 (Roll Call Vote 483: 398-1)

The bill "To amend the Wild and Scenic Rivers Act to authorize the Secretary of the Interior to maintain or replace certain facilities and structures for commercial recreation services at Smith Gulch in Idaho, and for other purposes" (H.R. 4283) is a bill that would require the United States Secretary of Agriculture to permit private entities to repair or replace certain commercial facilities on United States Forest Service land in Idaho.

H.R. 4283 was introduced into the United States House of Representatives during the 113th United States Congress.

== Background ==
The Salmon River is located in Idaho in the northwestern United States. The Salmon is also known as The River of No Return. It flows for 425 miles (684 km) through central Idaho, draining a rugged, thinly populated watershed of 14,000 square miles (36,260 km^{2}) and dropping more than 7,000 feet (2,134 m) between its headwaters, near Galena Summit above the Sawtooth Valley in the Sawtooth National Recreation Area, and its confluence with the Snake River. Measured at White Bird, its average discharge is 11,060 cubic feet (313 m^{3}) per second. It is one of the largest rivers in the continental United States without a single dam on its mainstem. Redfish Lake and Little Redfish Lake near Stanley, which flow into the river via Redfish Lake Creek, are the terminus of the longest Pacific sockeye salmon migration in North America.

== Provisions of the bill ==
This summary is based largely on the summary provided by the Congressional Research Service, a public domain source.

H.R. 4283 would amend the Wild and Scenic Rivers Act to direct the United States Secretary of the Interior, with respect to the North Fork of the Salmon River in Idaho, to authorize or continue to authorize maintenance or replacement of the facilities and structures listed in this Act for commercial recreation services at Smith Gulch.

H.R. 4283 would require the Secretary to bear the cost of any environmental, archaeological, or cultural analysis required by federal law or regulation that must be completed before the issuance of new or continued authorization of those facilities or structures.

== Congressional Budget Office report ==
This summary is based largely on the summary provided by the Congressional Budget Office, as ordered reported by the House Committee on Natural Resources on June 19, 2014. This is a public domain source.

H.R. 4283 would require the United States Secretary of Agriculture to permit private entities to repair or replace certain commercial facilities on United States Forest Service land in Idaho. Based on information provided by the Forest Service, the Congressional Budget Office (CBO) estimates that implementing the legislation would not affect the federal budget. Enacting H.R. 4283 would not affect direct spending or revenues; therefore, pay-as-you-go procedures do not apply.

Based on information provided by the Forest Service, CBO expects that, under current law, the agency would issue permits to allow commercial operators to repair or replace the affected facilities. In addition, commercial operators are required to pay administrative costs associated with granting or renewing such permits. Therefore, CBO estimates that implementing H.R. 4283 would not affect the federal budget.

H.R. 4283 contains no intergovernmental or private-sector mandates as defined in the Unfunded Mandates Reform Act and would not affect the budgets of state, local, or tribal governments.

== Procedural history ==
H.R. 4283 was introduced into the United States House of Representatives on March 21, 2014 by Rep. Michael K. Simpson (R, ID-2). It was referred to the United States House Committee on Natural Resources and the United States House Natural Resources Subcommittee on Public Lands and Environmental Regulation. The subcommittee reported it (amended) on July 17, 2014 alongside House Committee report 113-533. On September 8, 2014, the House voted in Roll Call Vote 483 to pass the bill 398-1.

== Debate and discussion ==
Rep. Simpson, who introduced the bill, said that "this legislation clarifies Congress' intent of the 2004 amendments to the Wild and Scenic Rivers Act which continued the existing use and occupancy of commercial services in this corridor of the Salmon River." According to Simpson, "the use of maintenance equipment would allow the lodge to eliminate the reliance on outdated energy sources and replace them with modest renewable energy sources."

== See also ==
- List of bills in the 113th United States Congress
