= William J. Lanting =

American politician

Member of the Idaho House of Representatives from the 24th district
- In office 1959–1975

Personal details
- Born: March 18, 1918 Twin Falls, Idaho, US
- Died: April 22, 1998 (aged 80) Hollister, Idaho, US
- Party: Republican

William John Lanting (March 18, 1918 - April 22, 1998) was an American politician who was a member of the Idaho House of Representatives between 1959 and 1975. He rose to the rank of Majority Leader in 1963 and speaker in May 1967.

== Early life ==
Lanting was born on March 18, 1918, in Twin Falls, Idaho.

== Idaho House of Representatives ==
In 1958, Lanting was elected to the Idaho House of Representatives. In 1959 he began his first of eight consecutive terms. In 1963 he rose to the position of majority leader and in May 1967, speaker, after Pete Cenarrusa resigned.
