= 2012 United States House of Representatives elections in Idaho =

- November 6, 2012

All 2 Idaho seats to the United States House of Representatives
	Majority party	Minority party
Party	Republican	Democratic
Last election	2	0
Seats won	2	0
Seat change	Steady	Steady
Popular vote	406,814	208,297
Percentage	64.04%	32.79%
Swing	▲5.07%	▼0.95%

Republican
40–50%
50–60%
60–70%
70–80%
80–90%
Democratic
40–50%
50–60%

The 2012 United States House of Representatives elections in Idaho were held on Tuesday, November 6, 2012, and elected two U.S. representatives, one from each of the state's two congressional districts. The elections coincided with those of other federal and state offices, including a quadrennial presidential election. Candidate filing took place between February 27 and March 9, 2012. Primary elections were held on May 15, 2012.

== Overview ==
United States House of Representatives elections in Idaho, 2012
Party	Votes	Percentage	Seats	+/–
Republican	406,814	64.04%	2	-
Democratic	208,297	32.79%	0	-
Libertarian	12,265	1.93%	0	-
Independents	7,607	1.20%	0	—
Write-ins	235	0.04%	0	—
Totals	635,218	100.00%	2	—

== Redistricting ==
Although Idaho's overall population grew by more than 20 percent during the period between 2000 and 2010, more significant growth elsewhere meant the state did not gain extra representation in the House of Representatives, instead remaining at two seats. The 2010 United States census found that the population of the 1st district, which previously comprised the state's western and northern counties, as well as parts of Ada County including much of western Boise, had 116,278 more residents than the 2nd district, which included the rest of Boise, the Magic Valley region and the state's eastern counties. This shift in population meant that the 2nd district, currently represented by Republican Mike Simpson, would include more of Ada County beginning in 2012 and up through the 2020 Congressional election.

In October 2011 the Idaho Commission on Redistricting approved by a 4–2 vote a Congressional district map which moved the district boundary in Boise west from Cole Road to Cloverdale Road. This placed almost all of Boise in the 2nd district, with only a few far western neighborhoods remaining in the 1st district. Other Ada County cities including Meridian, Eagle, Star, Kuna and Garden City remained in the 1st district. No changes were made to Congressional district boundaries outside Ada County.

On January 18, 2012, the Idaho Supreme Court struck down the redistricting plan approved by the Commission on Redistricting in October 2011 on the grounds that it violated the Idaho Constitution. The commission reconvened on January 26, 2012, to make necessary revisions which were approved the following day. The commission's January 2012 changes dealt solely with state legislative districts, leaving the original Congressional redistricting plan intact.

== District 1 ==
2010 Idaho's 1st congressional district election
- November 6, 2012
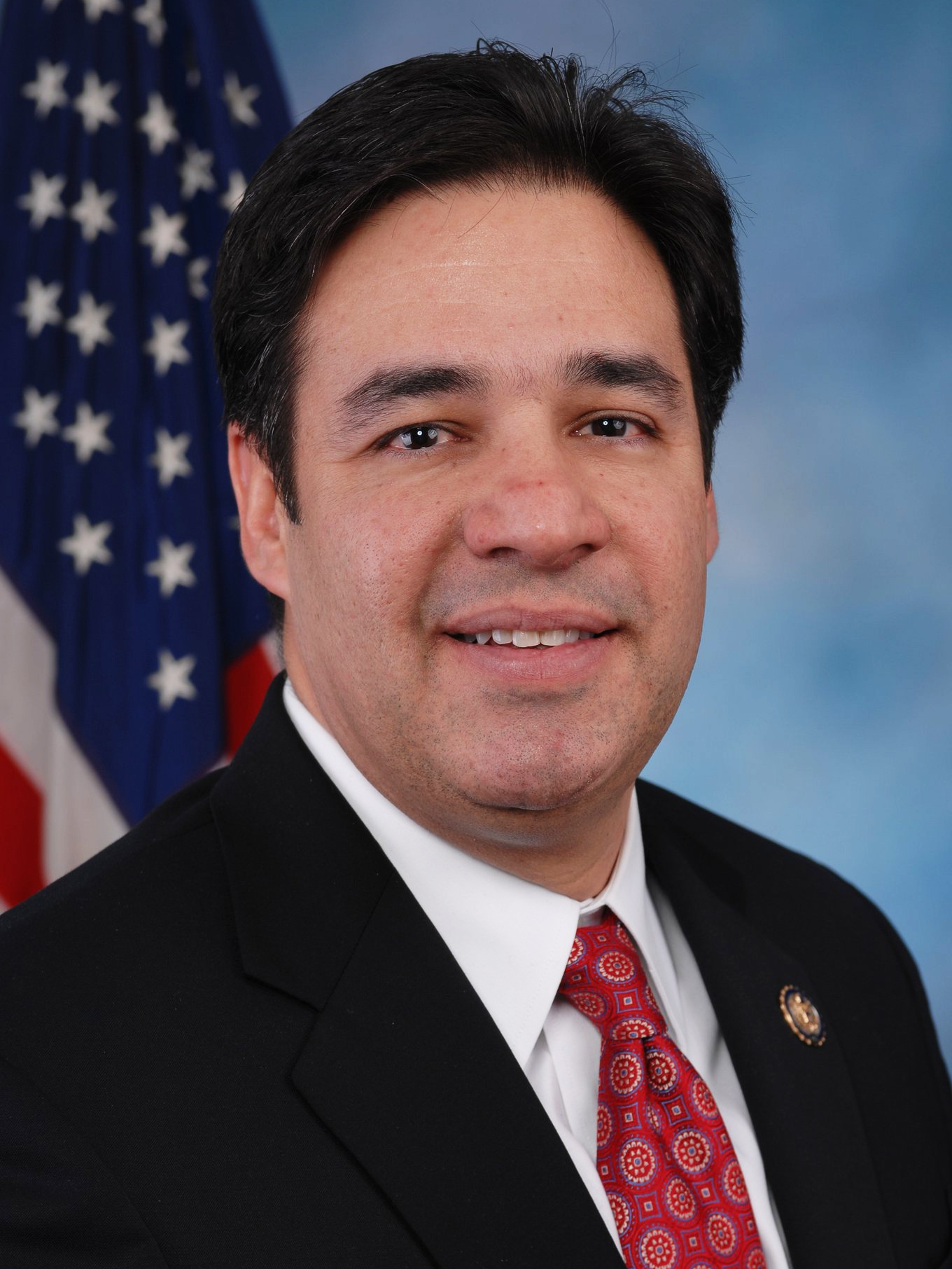

Nominee	Raúl Labrador	Jimmy Farris
Party	Republican	Democratic
Popular vote	199,402	97,450
Percentage	63.0%	30.8%
- County results Labrador: 40–50% 50–60% 60–70% 70–80% Farris: 40–50%
U.S. Representative before election
Raúl Labrador
Republican
Elected U.S. Representative
Raúl Labrador
Republican

Republican Raúl Labrador, who was first elected to represent the 1st district in 2010, will run for re-election.

=== Republican primary ===
==== Candidates ====
===== Nominee =====
- Raúl Labrador, incumbent U.S. Representative

===== Eliminated in primary =====
- Reed McCandless, truck driver

==== Primary results ====
Republican primary results
Party	Candidate	Votes	%
Republican	Raúl Labrador (incumbent)	58,003	80.6
Republican	Reed McCandless	13,917	19.4
Total votes		71,920	100.0

=== Democratic primary ===
==== Candidates ====
===== Nominee =====
- Jimmy Farris, former NFL player

===== Eliminated in primary =====
- Cynthia Clinkingbeard, former physician and college professor

===== Declined =====
- Walt Minnick, former U.S. Representative

==== Primary results ====
Democratic primary results
Party	Candidate	Votes	%
Democratic	Jimmy Farris	5,362	53.2
Democratic	Cynthia Clinkingbeard	4,723	46.8
Total votes		10,085	100.0

=== Libertarian primary ===
==== Candidates ====
===== Nominee =====
- Rob Oates, chairman of the Libertarian Party of Idaho and former member of the Caldwell City Council

=== Independents ===
Pro-Life, a perennial candidate formerly known as Marvin Richardson, ran as an Independent.

=== General election ===
==== Predictions ====
Source	Ranking	As of
The Cook Political Report	Safe R	November 5, 2012
Rothenberg	Safe R	November 2, 2012
Roll Call	Safe R	November 4, 2012
Sabato's Crystal Ball	Safe R	November 5, 2012
NY Times	Safe R	November 4, 2012
RCP	Safe R	November 4, 2012
The Hill	Safe R	November 4, 2012

==== Results ====
Idaho's 1st congressional district, 2012
Party	Candidate	Votes	%
Republican	Raúl Labrador (incumbent)	199,402	63.0
Democratic	Jimmy Farris	97,450	30.8
Libertarian	Rob Oates	12,265	3.9
Independent	Pro-Life	7,607	2.4
Total votes		316,724	100.0
Republican hold			

== District 2 ==
2012 Idaho's 2nd congressional district election
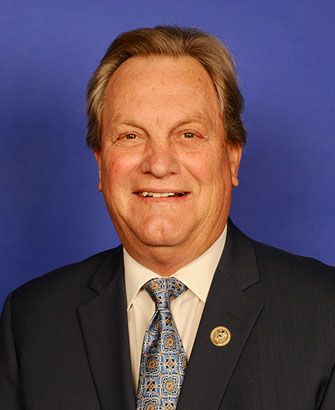

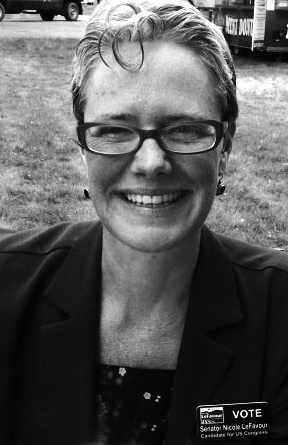
Nominee	Mike Simpson	Nicole LeFavour
Party	Republican	Democratic
Popular vote	207,412	110,847
Percentage	65.1%	34.8%
- County results Simpson: 50–60% 60–70% 70–80% 80–90% Lefavour: 50–60%
U.S. Representative before election
Mike Simpson
Republican
Elected U.S. Representative
Mike Simpson
Republican

Republican Mike Simpson, who had represented the 2nd district since 1999, ran for re-election.

=== Republican primary ===
==== Candidates ====
===== Nominee =====
- Mike Simpson, incumbent U.S. Representative

===== Eliminated in primary =====
- Chick Heileson, businessman and candidate for this seat in 2010

===== Withdrew =====
- John Baird, businessman

===== Declined =====
- Janice McGeachin, State representative

==== Primary results ====
Republican primary results
Party	Candidate	Votes	%
Republican	Mike Simpson (incumbent)	50,799	69.6
Republican	Chick Heileson	22,240	30.4
Total votes		73,039	100.0

=== Democratic primary ===
==== Candidates ====
===== Nominee =====
- Nicole LeFavour, State Senator

===== Eliminated in primary =====
- Jack Wayne Chappell

===== Withdrawn =====
- Eldon Wallace, nominee for Lieutenant Governor in 2010

==== Primary results ====
Democratic primary results
Party	Candidate	Votes	%
Democratic	Nicole LeFavour	10,528	84.1
Democratic	Jack Wayne Chappell	1,997	15.9
Total votes		12,525	100.0

=== General election ===
==== Predictions ====
Source	Ranking	As of
The Cook Political Report	Safe R	November 5, 2012
Rothenberg	Safe R	November 2, 2012
Roll Call	Safe R	November 4, 2012
Sabato's Crystal Ball	Safe R	November 5, 2012
NY Times	Safe R	November 4, 2012
RCP	Safe R	November 4, 2012
The Hill	Safe R	November 4, 2012

==== Results ====
Idaho's 2nd congressional district, 2012
Party	Candidate	Votes	%
Republican	Mike Simpson (incumbent)	207,412	65.1
Democratic	Nicole LeFavour	110,847	34.8
Independent	Jack Wayne Campbell (write-in)	235	0.1
Total votes		318,494	100.0
Republican hold			
