= Sue Chew =

American politician (1958–2024)

- Chew in 2022

Member of the Idaho House of Representatives from District 17 Seat B
- In office December 1, 2006 – April 17, 2024
- Preceded by: Janet Miller
- Succeeded by: Megan Egbert

Personal details
- Born: March 31, 1958 Oakland, California, U.S.
- Died: April 17, 2024 (aged 66)
- Party: Democratic
- Education: University of California, Berkeley; University of California, San Francisco
- Profession: Pharmacist, educator

Susan Beatrice Chew (March 31, 1958 – April 17, 2024) was an American politician who was the Democratic Idaho State Representative from 2006 on, representing District 17 in the B seat.

== Early life and education ==
Sue Chew was born in California on March 31, 1958. Her father was one of the first lawyers in California of Chinese descent. Chew earned her bachelor's degree in biology and natural resources from University of California, Berkeley, and her Doctor of Pharmacy degree from University of California, San Francisco.

== Elections ==
=== 2006 ===
Chew was unopposed in the Democratic primary, winning with 875 votes. Chew defeated incumbent Republican Representative Janet J. Miller and Constitution Party nominee Katherine Frazier, with 58.38% of the vote.

=== 2008 ===
Chew was unopposed in the Democratic primary. Chew defeated Republican nominee Daniel A. Loughrey with 64.7% of the vote.

=== 2010 ===
Chew and Loughrey were both unopposed for their primaries, setting up a rematch; Chew won the Democratic primary with 766 votes. Turnout for the general election was lower by nearly 6,000 votes than in 2008, with Chew winning with 5,591 votes (59.4%) against Loughrey.

=== 2012 ===
Chew was opposed by Greg Nielson in the Democratic primary, Chew won with 88.9% of the vote. Chew defeated Republican nominee Chad Inman and Libertarian nominee Mikel Hautzinger in the general election with 62.7% of the vote.

=== 2014 ===
Chew ran unopposed in both the Democratic primary and general election.

=== 2016 ===
Chew was unopposed in the Democratic primary. Chew defeated Republican nominee Tabby Jolley with 62.6% of the vote.

=== 2018 ===
Chew was unopposed in the Democratic primary. Chew defeated Republican nominee David L. DeHaas with 69.7% of the vote.

=== 2020 ===
Chew was unopposed in the Democratic primary. Chew defeated Republican nominee Anthony T. Dephue with 66% of the vote.

== Illness and death ==
Chew was diagnosed with pancreatic cancer in 2023, and died from this disease in April 2024, at age 66.

== See also ==
- History of Chinese Americans in Idaho
