= 2020 Idaho elections =

- November 3, 2020
- Registered: 1,082,417
- Turnout: 76.5%

A general election were held in the U.S. state of Idaho on November 3, 2020; with primaries being held in March and May. To vote by mail, registered Idaho voters must have requested a ballot by October 23, 2020.

== Federal offices ==
=== President of the United States ===
Idaho had four electoral votes in the Electoral College. Republican Donald Trump won all of them with 64% of the popular vote.

=== United States Senate ===
One of the two United States Senators representing Idaho was up for election. Incumbent Republican Jim Risch won with 63% of the votes.

=== United States House of Representatives ===
Idaho had two representatives in the United States House of Representatives who were up for election. Republicans won all of the districts. No seats changed hands.

== State offices ==
=== Legislative ===
All 35 seats in the Idaho Senate and 70 seats in the Idaho House of Representatives were up for election.

==== Idaho Senate ====
Party	Before	After	Change
Republican	28	28	Steady
Democratic	7	7	Steady
Total	35	35	

==== Idaho House of Representatives ====
Party	Before	After	Change
Republican	56	58	▲2
Democratic	14	12	▼2
Total	70	70	

=== Judicial ===
==== Supreme Court ====
Two justices on the Idaho Supreme Court ran for election.

Justice Gregory Moeller was appointed by Governor Butch Otter in 2018 to succeed Joel Horton, while John Stegner was appointed by Otter earlier in the same year to succeed Warren Jones. Both of them ran unopposed and secured another term.

==== Court of Appeals ====
Idaho Court of Appeals Judge Amanda Brailsford was appointed by Governor Otter in 2018 to replace Sergio Gutierrez. She ran for a full term and won unopposed.

== Ballot measures ==
=== Constitutional Amendment HJR 4 (2020) ===
Results by county Yes: 70–80%; 60–70%; 50–60%

The Idaho Constitutional Amendment HJR 4 would ensure there are 35 state senate districts.

Constitutional Amendment HJR 4
Choice	Votes	%
For	525,779	67.95
Against	247,966	32.05
Total	773,745	100.00

== See also ==
- Elections in Idaho
- Politics of Idaho
- Political party strength in Idaho
