= Jimmy Farris =

American football player (born 1978)

No. 87, 86, 16
- Position: Wide receiver

Personal information
- Born: April 13, 1978 (age 48); Lewiston, Idaho, U.S.
- Listed height: 6 ft 0 in (1.83 m)
- Listed weight: 200 lb (91 kg)

Career information
- High school: Lewiston High School
- College: Montana
- NFL draft: 2001: undrafted

Career history
- San Francisco 49ers (2001)*; New England Patriots (2002)*; Atlanta Falcons (2002–2004); Washington Redskins (2005); Jacksonville Jaguars (2007)*; Washington Redskins (2007)
- * Offseason or practice squad member only

Awards and highlights
- Super Bowl champion (XXXVI); I-AA All-American (2000)

Career NFL statistics
- Receptions: 7
- Receiving yards: 118
- Receiving TDs: 2
- Stats at Pro Football Reference

James Robert Farris (born April 13, 1978) is an American former professional football player who was a wide receiver in the National Football League (NFL). He played college football for the Montana Grizzlies. After his football career, he was an unsuccessful candidate for the United States Congress in 2012. He won Super Bowl XXXVI with the New England Patriots.

== Early life ==
Farris attended Lewiston High School in Lewiston, Idaho, and was a letterman in football, basketball, and track. In football, Farris helped in leading his team to their first Idaho High School Football State Championship as a sophomore, and as a senior, to the State Football Championship Game and finished his senior season with 78 receptions for 1,510 yards and 18 touchdowns. In basketball, he was named the team's most valuable player as a senior.

== College ==
Farris attended the University of Montana, where he was a four-year letterman and All-American for the Grizzlies, leading them to the national championship game in 2000. His game-winning catch in the semi-final game against Appalachian State sent the "Griz" to their third championship game appearance in six years.

== NFL career ==
He was signed by the San Francisco 49ers as an undrafted free agent in 2001. Farris was also a member of the New England Patriots, Atlanta Falcons, Washington Redskins and Jacksonville Jaguars.

He has worked for Comcast Sports Southeast as a host and analyst on Sportsnite, as well as host his own NFL Fantasy Football web show called Side:Line with Jimmy Farris. Farris currently works as a guest NFL analyst on CBS46 in Atlanta, GA.

== Political career ==
In 2012 Farris was the Democratic candidate for the United States House of Representatives in Idaho's 1st congressional district, running against the incumbent, Republican Raúl Labrador. He defeated Cynthia Clinkingbeard in the Democratic Party primary on May 15. Labrador won the general election, 63% to 30.8%.

Farris was a candidate for an open Idaho House of Representatives seat in the Garden City-based District 16 in 2014, but was defeated in the Democratic primary by teacher and activist John McCrostie.

Party political offices
Preceded by Walt Minnick	Democratic Party nominee, Idaho's 1st congressional district 2012	Most recent
