= Tom Boyd (Idaho politician) =

American politician

37th Speaker of the Idaho House of Representatives
- In office December 4, 1986 – December 1, 1992
- Preceded by: Tom W. Stivers
- Succeeded by: Mike Simpson

Member of the Idaho House of Representatives from the 5th district
- In office December 1, 1976 – December 1, 1992
- Preceded by: Norma Dobler
- Succeeded by: Maynard Miller

Personal details
- Born: Thomas Gregg Boyd; September 5, 1928 Filer, Idaho, U.S.
- Died: July 27, 2015 (aged 86) Moscow, Idaho, U.S.
- Party: Republican
- Spouse: Beverly Lee Bressler (m. 1951)
- Children: 3
- Education: University of Idaho (BS)

Military service
- Branch/service: United States Air Force

Thomas Gregg Boyd (September 5, 1928 – July 27, 2015) was an American farmer and politician.

Born in Filer, Idaho, Boyd graduated from the Twin Falls High School in Twin Falls, Idaho and then received his bachelor's degree in business from University of Idaho. Boyd served in the United States Air Force and was stationed in California. Boyd and his family owned a farm in Genesee, Idaho. Boyd served on the Idaho Board of Education and the Genesee School Board. He also served on the Idaho Pea and Lentil Commission. Boyd served on the Idaho House of Representatives between 1977 and 1992 as a Republican and was speaker of the house. Boyd died at a hospital in Moscow, Idaho.
