= Janet Miller =

American politician

Member of the Idaho House of Representatives from District 17 Seat B
- In office December 1, 2002 – November 30, 2006
- Preceded by: Ruby Stone
- Succeeded by: Sue Chew

Personal details
- Born: August 9, 1937 Salt Lake City, Utah
- Died: March 23, 2007 (aged 69)
- Party: Republican

Janet Miller (1937–2007) was an American politician, who served as a Republican member of the Idaho House of Representatives for the 17th district. She was a critic of the Patriot Act.
