= Curt McKenzie =

American politician from Idaho

Member of the Idaho Senate
- In office December 1, 2002 – December 1, 2016
- Preceded by: Jerry Thorne
- Succeeded by: Jeff Agenbroad
- Constituency: 12th district (2002–2012); 13th district (2012–2016)

Personal details
- Born: February 9, 1969 (age 57) Corvallis, Oregon, U.S.
- Party: Republican
- Children: 2
- Education: Northwest Nazarene University (BA); Georgetown University (JD)

Curtis "Curt" McKenzie (born February 9, 1969) is an American attorney and politician who served as a member of the Idaho Senate from 2012 to 2016.

== Early life and education ==
McKenzie was born in Corvallis, Oregon He earned a Bachelor of Arts degree in physics and history from Northwest Nazarene University in 1992 and a Juris Doctor from Georgetown University Law Center in 1995. While at NNU, he was a member of the varsity soccer and track team and was chief justice of the Student Judicial Council. At Georgetown, he was an editor of The Tax Lawyer and was selected to one of the traveling trial teams.

== Career ==
After law school, he was admitted to the bars of the State of Maryland (1995) and Washington, D.C. (1996) He later joined Arter & Hadden, specializing civil appellate and intellectual property law. In 1997, McKenzie returned to Idaho and was admitted to Idaho State Bar. He worked as a trial attorney in the Ada County Prosecuting Attorney’s Office before joining the law firm of Stoel Rives, LLP with a civil litigation practice.

McKenzie has owned McKenzie Law Offices, PLLC since 2006.

=== Idaho Senate ===
McKenzie served in the Idaho Senate from 2002 to 2016. From 2011 until 2016, he also served as chair of the Senate State Affairs Committee.

=== 2016 Idaho Supreme Court election ===
McKenzie did not seek re-election to the Idaho State Senate in 2016. Instead, McKenzie ran for a seat on the Idaho Supreme Court in 2016. He was one of the top two finishers during the May 17 election receiving 41,348 of the votes (27.7%). He advanced to a November 8 runoff against attorney Robyn Brody. McKenzie was defeated, earning 256,719 of the vote (46.2%).

== Personal life ==
McKenzie and his ex-wife, Renee, have two children.
