= Mike Simpson =

American politician (born 1950)

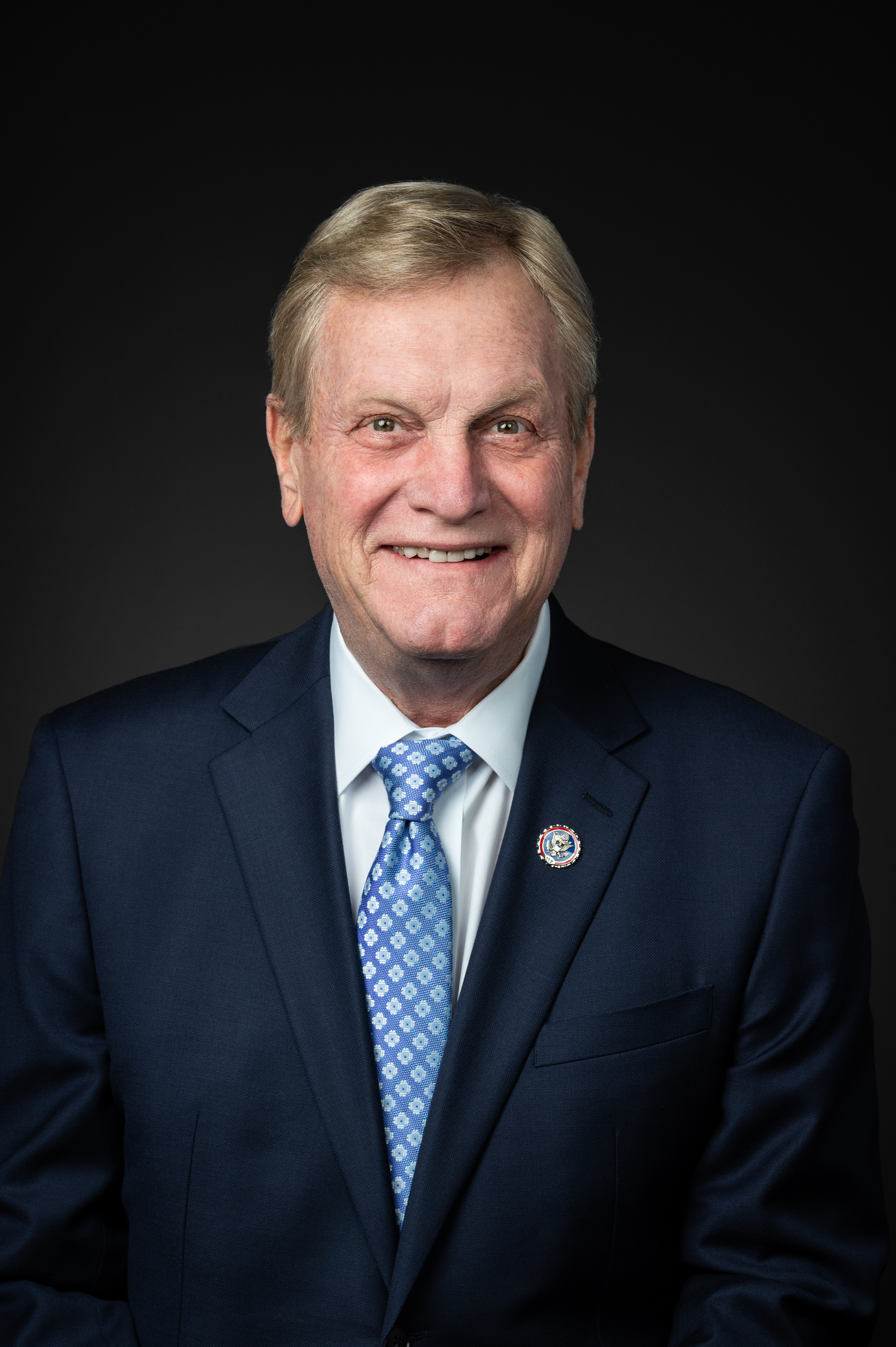
- Official portrait, 2022

Member of the U.S. House of Representatives from Idaho's 2nd district
- Incumbent
- Assumed office January 3, 1999
- Preceded by: Mike Crapo

38th Speaker of the Idaho House of Representatives
- In office December 1992 – December 1, 1998
- Preceded by: Tom Boyd
- Succeeded by: Bruce Newcomb

Member of the Idaho House of Representatives
- In office December 1, 1984 – December 1, 1998
- Preceded by: Jerry Wellard
- Succeeded by: Stan Williams
- Constituency: District 26B (1984–1992); District 31B (1992–1998)

Personal details
- Born: Michael Keith Simpson; September 8, 1950 (age 76) Burley, Idaho, U.S.
- Party: Republican
- Spouse: Kathy Simpson (m. 1977)
- Education: Utah State University (BS); Washington University (DMD)
- Website: House website Campaign website
- Simpson's voice Simpson supporting the Sawtooth National Recreation Area and Jerry Peak Wilderness Additions Act. Recorded July 27, 2015

Michael Keith Simpson (born September 8, 1950) is an American politician serving as the U.S. representative for Idaho's 2nd congressional district since 1999. The district covers most of the eastern portion of the state, including Idaho Falls, Pocatello, Sun Valley, Twin Falls and the northern two-thirds of Boise. He is a member of the Republican Party.

Previously, Simpson served in the Idaho House of Representatives from 1984 to 1998, and was Speaker of the Idaho House of Representatives from 1992 to 1998. Simpson was first elected to Congress in 1998.

A moderate Republican, Simpson is a member of the Republican Main Street Partnership and has taken bipartisan or moderate positions on issues including climate change, immigration reform, LGBT rights, arts funding, and foreign aid to Ukraine.

== Early life, education and private career ==
Born in Burley, Simpson was raised in Blackfoot, where his father was a dentist. He graduated from Blackfoot High School in 1968, Utah State University in Logan in 1972, and the dental school of Washington University in St. Louis in St. Louis, Missouri, in 1977. Simpson practiced dentistry in Blackfoot until his election to Congress in 1998. He was elected to the Blackfoot City Council in 1980 and to the state legislature in 1984, the first of seven terms. He was the speaker of the Idaho House before his election to Congress.

== U.S. House of Representatives ==
=== Elections ===
==== 1998 ====
Simpson entered the 1998 campaign for the U.S. House seat vacated by Mike Crapo, who was running for United States Senate. He defeated former Democratic congressman Richard Stallings, who held the seat from 1985 to 1993, in the general election with 52% of the vote. He has never faced another contest that close; Stallings was the last Democrat to win even 40% of the vote.

Simpson did not face serious opposition in 2000, 2002, or 2004. In 2006, Simpson defeated former Democratic state representative Jim D. Hansen, son of former Republican congressman Orval Hansen, with 61% of the vote.

==== 2008 ====
Simpson won the Republican primary 85.2% of the vote, defeating two primary challengers.

Simpson won the general election with 71% of the vote, defeating Democratic nominee Debbie Holmes.

During the 2008 presidential primaries, Simpson was an early supporter of former Massachusetts governor Mitt Romney and a member of his Congressional Whip Team.

==== 2010 ====
2010 GOP primary results by county: Simpson: 50–60%; 60–70%; 70–80%; Heilison: 40–50%

Simpson won the Republican primary with 58.3% of the vote, defeating Chick Heileson, Russ Mathews, and Katherine Burton.

Simpson was re-elected with 68.8% of the vote, defeating Democratic nominee Mike Crawford and Independent candidate Brian Schad.

==== 2012 ====
In the Republican primary, Simpson defeated Chick Helieson with 69.6% of the vote.

Simpson was re-elected with 65.1% of the vote, defeating Democratic state senator Nicole LeFavour in the general election.

==== 2014 ====
In the Republican primary, Simpson defeated lawyer Bryan Smith with 61.8% of the vote.

Simpson was re-elected with 61.4% of the vote, defeating former congressman Richard Stallings in the general election.

==== 2016 ====
In the Republican primary, Simpson defeated perennial candidate Lisa Marie with 73% of the vote.

Simpson was re-elected with 62.9% of the vote, defeating Jennifer Martinez and Anthony Tomkins in the general election.

==== 2018 ====
Simpson won the Republican nomination unopposed.

Simpson was re-elected with 60.7% of the vote.

==== 2020 ====
Simpson was re-nominated with 72% of the vote, defeating former mixed martial arts fighter Kevin Rhoades in the Republican primary.

Simpson was re-elected with 64.1% of the vote, defeating Democratic nominee Aaron Swisher in the general election.

==== 2022 ====
2022 GOP primary results by county: Simpson: 40–50%; 50–60%; 60–70%; 70–80%; Smith: 40–50%

Simpson was renominated with 54.6% of the vote, defeating 2014 opponent Bryan Smith 54.6%–32.7%, with three other candidates splitting the rest of the vote.

Simpson was re-elected with 63.6% of the vote.

==== 2024 ====
2024 GOP primary results by county: Simpson: 40–50%; 50–60%; 60–70%; 70–80%; Cleveland: 40–50%

Simpson won the Republican primary with 54.7%, defeating Scott Cleveland and Sean Higgins. He outspent his two primary opponents 6–1, spending $552,233. Cleveland spent $83,725 and received 35.8% of the vote, while Higgins spent $1,021 and received 9.5% of the vote.

Simpson was re-elected with 61.4% of the vote.

==== 2026 ====
Simpson won the Republican primary with 63.3% of the vote, defeating Brian Keene and Perry Shumway. He outspent Shumway 300–1, spending $607,181. Shumway spent $2,836 and received 15.8% of the vote. Keene received 20.9% of the vote.

=== Tenure ===
While the Republican Party held the majority in the U.S. House of Representatives, Simpson often served as the speaker pro tempore of the House, particularly during debates on controversial legislation, due to his command of House procedure. Simpson is known to have broken several sounding boards with the gavel while calling the House to order. This inspired him to have a number of sounding boards produced in Idaho, which he presented to then speaker of the House Dennis Hastert as a joke. When the Republican Party regained control of the House of Representatives in 2010, Simpson began once again to serve frequently as Speaker Pro Tempore.

In the 111th United States Congress Simpson became the Ranking Member on the Interior, Environment, and Related Agencies Appropriations Subcommittee. He also serves as the small state representative on the 33-member House Republican Steering Committee. Known as the "committee of committees", the Steering Committee decides which Republican lawmakers become ranking members on House committees. Simpson replaced Don Young on the committee.

==== Larry Craig scandal ====
On June 11, 2007, U.S. senator Larry Craig was arrested for indecent behavior in a men's restroom at Minneapolis–St. Paul International Airport; he pleaded guilty to a charge of disorderly conduct in August 2007 and paid $575 in court fines and fees. Simpson was openly considered for an appointment to the Senate if Craig resigned. Simpson, however, asked Governor Butch Otter to remove his name from consideration, claiming that the Idaho congressional delegation would be in a better position if he were to remain in the House and retain his seniority on the House Appropriations Committee.

Simpson criticized Senate leadership treatment of Craig. He said: "If that's how they treat their own, that tells me they're more interested in party than individuals, and the party is made up of individuals. How you treat them says a lot about your party." Simpson demanded that Craig be treated fairly, saying "They have people over there [in the Senate Republican Conference] in far worse trouble that they haven't said a thing about."

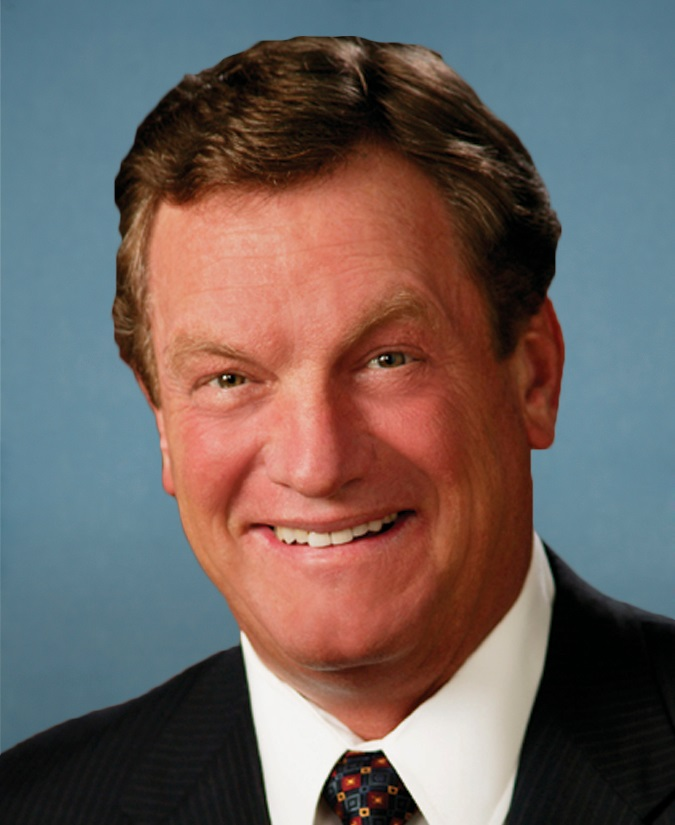
Simpson during the 113th Congress

==== 2013 government shutdown ====
In October 2013, Simpson voted to end the United States federal government shutdown of 2013.

==== Gun rights ====
Simpson was one of the members of Congress to sign the D.C. v. Heller amicus brief which supported a recognition of the Second Amendment as an individual right.

==== Idaho-focused environmental legislation ====
Simpson's hallmark legislation is the Central Idaho Economic Development and Recreation Act (CIEDRA), which would create 312,000 acres of wilderness in central Idaho, much of which is currently a wilderness study area. He has faced substantial resistance from groups like the Sierra Club, which claim the bill lacks "wilderness values" because it allows for motorized access to certain parts of the wilderness area and some federal land would be transferred to the State of Idaho to promote the economic development of the local community and the recreational use of National Forest land and other public lands in central Idaho. Simpson has also faced opposition from groups that oppose new federal land designations, and wilderness designations particularly, because of restricted access to wilderness areas. In August 2015, a revised version of CIEDRA, the Sawtooth National Recreation Area and Jerry Peak Wilderness Additions Act, passed Congress and was signed by President Obama, creating the Hemingway–Boulders, Jim McClure–Jerry Peak, and White Clouds wilderness areas, which cover a total of 275,665 acres (111,558 ha) of central Idaho.

On March 21, 2014, Simpson introduced the bill To amend the Wild and Scenic Rivers Act to authorize the Secretary of the Interior to maintain or replace certain facilities and structures for commercial recreation services at Smith Gulch in Idaho (H.R. 4283; 113th Congress). The bill would require the United States secretary of agriculture to permit private entities to repair or replace certain commercial facilities on United States Forest Service land in Idaho. Simpson said, "this legislation clarifies Congress's intent of the 2004 amendments to the Wild and Scenic Rivers Act which continued the existing use and occupancy of commercial services in this corridor of the Salmon River". The legislation passed the House, but stalled in the Senate.

In February 2021, Simpson announced a "Salmon and Energy" concept intended to restore Snake River salmon while protecting agricultural and energy interests across the Columbia River basin.

=== Committee assignments ===
For the 118th Congress:

- Committee on Appropriations
  - Subcommittee on Energy and Water Development and Related Agencies
  - Subcommittee on Interior, Environment, and Related Agencies (Chairman)
  - Subcommittee on Labor, Health and Human Services, Education, and Related Agencies

=== Party leadership ===
- House Republican Steering Committee

=== Caucus membership ===
- Afterschool Caucuses
- House Potato Caucus – Co-chair
- House Sugar Caucus – Co-chair
- Oral Health Caucus – Co-chair
- Congressional TRIO Caucus – Co-chair
- Congressional Arts Caucus
- Congressional Western Caucus
- Nuclear Cleanup Caucus
- Main Street Caucus
- Rare Disease Caucus
- Congressional Caucus on Turkey and Turkish Americans
- Congressional Taiwan Caucus

== Political positions ==
Since 1998, Simpson has been known as a moderate Republican. For example, he has supported the National Endowment for the Arts and the National Endowment for the Humanities, voting each year against Republican amendments to strip them of funding. In the past he has opposed earmarks.

Esquire listed Simpson as one of the 10 best members of Congress in October 2008. The magazine wrote, "More than any other representative, Simpson lives by the philosophy that democratic representation is a matter of finding not advantageous positions but common ground". The magazine's portrayal of Simpson echoes one of his personal philosophies, which is embodied in Henry Clay's words: "Politics is not about ideological purity or moral self-righteousness. It is about governing, and if a politician cannot compromise he cannot govern effectively." This quotation is framed and hangs in Simpson's Washington D.C. office. Simpson played a key role in the election of John Boehner as House majority leader in the 109th United States Congress. He was close and loyal to Speaker John Boehner.

=== Donald Trump ===
During the 2016 U.S. presidential election, Mike Simpson declined to endorse Donald Trump, the only Republican in Idaho's congressional delegation to do so. Simpson called him "unfit to be president," and later stated he would not vote for Trump in the general election, a departure from other Idaho Republicans such as Jim Risch, Mike Crapo, and Raúl Labrador who backed Trump.

After the firing of FBI Director James Comey, Simpson said he'd believe Comey's version of events over Trump's. Simpson was one of few Republicans calling for an independent commission to look into the ties between the president and Russia.

In 2025, Simpson called for renaming the Opera House at the John F. Kennedy Center for the Performing Arts after first lady Melania Trump. The editorial board of the Idaho Statesman described the move as sycophantic.

=== Immigration ===
In 2021, Simpson was one of 30 Republicans who voted for the Farm Workforce Modernization Act, which would grant legal status to certain illegal immigrants working in agriculture and establish a pathway to permanent residency contingent on continued farm work.

Simpson voted for the Further Consolidated Appropriations Act of 2020, which authorized DHS to nearly double the available H-2B visas for the remainder of FY 2020.

Simpson voted for the Consolidated Appropriations Act (H.R. 1158).

Simpson supports Deferred Action for Childhood Arrivals (DACA).

=== LGBT rights ===
In 2021, Simpson was among the House Republicans to sponsor the Fairness for All Act, the Republican alternative to the Equality Act. The bill would prohibit discrimination on the basis of sex, sexual orientation, and gender identity, and protect the free exercise of religion.

In 2021, Simpson was one of 29 Republicans to vote to reauthorize the Violence Against Women Act. This bill expanded legal protections for transgender people and contained provisions allowing transgender women to use women's shelters and serve time in prisons matching their gender identity.

In 2022, Simpson was one of 47 House Republicans to vote with the Democratic Party for the Respect for Marriage Act, repealing the Defense of Marriage Act. He later voted for the final form of the bill as passed in the Senate in December.

=== Jim Jordan speaker nomination ===
After the removal of Kevin McCarthy as Speaker of the House, Simpson was one of 18 Republicans who voted against Jim Jordan, who had been endorsed by Donald Trump, in all three ballots for Speaker of the House. This prompted sharp criticism from the Idaho Republican Party, which said it had been "inundated" with complaints from voters and accused Simpson of aligning with Democrats and failing to represent the priorities of Idaho constituents.

=== Judgeships ===
Simpson has pushed to divide the United States Court of Appeals for the Ninth Circuit, sponsoring bills to that effect in 2007, 2011, 2017, and 2021. None of these bills were successful.

In 2010, Simpson joined congressman Walt Minnick in his effort to secure a third federal judge for Idaho. Simpson said, "The caseload of the Idaho District Court has increased significantly in recent decades resulting in Idaho's district judges carrying a disproportionate share of cases in relation to their colleagues in other states."

As of November 2026, Idaho still has two federal judgeships.

=== 2020 election ===
In December 2020, Simpson was one of 126 Republican members of the House of Representatives to sign an amicus brief in support of Texas v. Pennsylvania, a lawsuit filed at the United States Supreme Court contesting the results of the 2020 presidential election. The Supreme Court declined to hear the case on the basis that Texas lacked standing under Article III of the Constitution to challenge the results of an election held by another state.

In January 2021, Simpson voted to certify both Arizona's and Pennsylvania's results in the 2021 United States Electoral College vote count.

On May 19, 2021, Simpson was one of 35 Republicans to join all Democrats in voting to approve legislation to establish the January 6 commission meant to investigate the attack of the U.S. Capitol.

=== Health care ===
Simpson has committed to repealing the Affordable Care Act (also known as Obamacare), questioning its constitutionality and effectiveness.

In 2014, Simpson was an original co-sponsor of the Newborn Screening Saves Lives Reauthorization Act of 2013 (H.R. 1281; 113th Congress), a bill that would amend the Public Health Service Act to reauthorize grant programs and other initiatives to promote expanded screening of newborns and children for heritable disorders.

In 2017, Simpson voted for and presided over the vote on the American Health Care Act of 2017.

=== Tax reform ===
Simpson supports tax reform. When asked about the Grover Norquist pledge to oppose any net increase in taxes, Simpson said, "Well, first, the pledge: I signed that in 1998 when I first ran. I didn't know I was signing a marriage agreement that would last forever."

Simpson voted for the Tax Cuts and Jobs Act of 2017. After passing the bill, he said he spoke to Idaho farmers, ranchers and businesses who called for a simplified tax code and reform. He said the bill would "create economic growth in the United States by unleashing American small businesses and unburdening middle-class families so they can make better financial decisions with their own money."

=== Climate change ===
In a 2019 conference in Boise, Simpson said: "climate change is a reality. It’s not hard to figure out. Go look at your thermometer." In his speech, he tied climate change to the viability of salmon in Idaho lakes and rivers.

=== Energy ===
Simpson is a support of nuclear power, extolling its virtues as an environmentally friendly source of energy with minimal carbon output. His support for nuclear energy plays a significant role in his membership of the United States House Appropriations Subcommittee on Energy and Water Development, which oversees the Idaho National Laboratory, a main site for nuclear and alternative energy research in the United States.

On June 20, 2014, Simpson introduced the Energy and Water Development and Related Agencies Appropriations Act, 2015 (H.R. 4923; 113th Congress), a bill that would make appropriations for energy and water development and related agencies for FY2015. The bill would appropriate $34 billion, which is $50 million less than these agencies then received. The appropriations for the United States Department of Energy and the United States Army Corps of Engineers are made by this bill.

=== Ukraine ===
In 2022, Simpson voted to provide approximately $14 billion to the government of Ukraine.

=== Social issues ===
Simpson supports efforts to make it illegal to desecrate the American flag.

=== Abortion ===
Simpson is anti-abortion. He has a zero rating from NARAL Pro-Choice America and a 100% rating from the National Right to Life Committee for his voting record on abortion. He opposes using federal monies to fund abortions, embryonic stem cell research, restricting the transport of minors over state lines to receive abortions, partial-birth abortions except to save a mother's life and human cloning. He supports cutting federal funding of Planned Parenthood.

=== Big Tech ===
In 2022, Simpson was one of 39 Republicans to vote for the Merger Filing Fee Modernization Act of 2021, an antitrust package that would crack down on corporations for anti-competitive behavior.

=== Pesticides ===
Simpson sponsored H.R. 4754 (Department of the Interior, Environment, and Related Agencies Appropriations Act, 2026) which would shield pesticides makers including Bayer by not allowing glyphosate to be labeled under the Federal Insecticide, Fungicide, and Rodenticide Act (FIFRA) as carcinogenic. This would end lawsuits against Monsanto which often allege that a lack of cancer warning amounts to mislabeling under FIFRA.

== Election results ==
=== 2024 ===
2024 Idaho's 2nd congressional district Republican primary
Party	Candidate	Votes	%
Republican	Michael K. Simpson (incumbent)	53,476	54.7%
Republican	Scott Cleveland	35,036	35.8%
Republican	Sean Higgins	9,333	9.5%
Total votes		97,845	100.0

2024 Idaho's 2nd congressional district election
Party	Candidate	Votes	%
Republican	Michael K. Simpson (incumbent)	250,119	61.4%
Democratic	David Roth	126,229	31.0%
Libertarian	Todd Corsetti	21,310	5.2%
Constitution	Idaho Law	9,804	2.4%
Total votes		407,462	100.0
Republican hold			

=== 2022 ===
2022 Idaho's 2nd congressional district Republican primary
Party	Candidate	Votes	%
Republican	Michael K. Simpson (incumbent)	67,177	54.6%
Republican	Bryan Smith	40,267	32.7%
Republican	Flint Christensen	7,113	5.8%
Republican	Chris Porter	6,357	5.2%
Republican	Daniel Algiers Lucas Levy	2,185	1.8%
Total votes		123,099	100.0

2022 Idaho's 2nd congressional district election
Party	Candidate	Votes	%
Republican	Michael K. Simpson (incumbent)	172,450	63.6%
Democratic	Wendy Norman	98,736	36.4%
Total votes		271,186	100.0
Republican hold			

=== 2020 ===
2020 Idaho's 2nd congressional district Republican primary
Party	Candidate	Votes	%
Republican	Michael K. Simpson (incumbent)	68,675	72.0%
Republican	Kevin Rhoades	26,724	28.0%
Total votes		95,399	100.0

2020 Idaho's 2nd congressional district election
Party	Candidate	Votes	%
Republican	Michael K. Simpson (incumbent)	250,669	64.1%
Democratic	Aaron Swisher	124,151	31.7%
Constitution	Pro-Life	8,573	2.2%
Libertarian	Idaho Law	7,940	2.0%
Total votes		391,333	100.0
Republican hold			

=== 2018 ===
2018 Idaho's 2nd congressional district Republican primary
Party	Candidate	Votes	%
Republican	Michael K. Simpson (incumbent)	72,243	100.0%
Total votes		72,243	100.0

2018 Idaho's 2nd congressional district election
Party	Candidate	Votes	%
Republican	Michael K. Simpson (incumbent)	170,274	60.7%
Democratic	Aaron Swisher	110,381	39.3%
Total votes		280,655	100.0
Republican hold			

=== 2016 ===
2016 Idaho's 2nd congressional district Republican primary
Party	Candidate	Votes	%
Republican	Michael K. Simpson (incumbent)	47,116	73.0%
Republican	Lisa Marie	17,442	27.0%
Total votes		64,558	100.0

2016 Idaho's 2nd congressional district election
Party	Candidate	Votes	%
Republican	Michael K. Simpson (incumbent)	205,292	62.9%
Democratic	Jennifer Martinez	95,940	29.4%
Constitution	Anthony Tomkins	25,005	7.7%
Total votes		326,237	100.0
Republican hold			

=== 2014 ===
2014 Idaho's 2nd congressional district Republican primary
Party	Candidate	Votes	%
Republican	Michael K. Simpson (incumbent)	48,632	61.6%
Republican	Bryan Smith	30,263	38.4%
Total votes		78,895	100.0

2014 Idaho's 2nd congressional district election
Party	Candidate	Votes	%
Republican	Michael K. Simpson (incumbent)	131,492	61.4%
Democratic	Richard Stallings	82,801	38.6%
Total votes		214,293	100.0
Republican hold			

=== 2012 ===
2012 Idaho's 2nd congressional district Republican primary
Party	Candidate	Votes	%
Republican	Michael K. Simpson (incumbent)	50,799	69.6%
Republican	M.C. Heileson	22,240	30.4%
Total votes		73,039	100.0

2012 Idaho's 2nd congressional district election
Party	Candidate	Votes	%
Republican	Michael K. Simpson (incumbent)	207,412	65.1%
Democratic	Nicole LeFavour	110,847	34.8%
Democratic	Jack Wayne Chappell (write-in)	235	0.1%
Total votes		318,494	100.0
Republican hold			

=== 2010 ===
2010 Idaho's 2nd congressional district Republican primary
Party	Candidate	Votes	%
Republican	Mike Simpson (incumbent)	45,148	58.3%
Republican	Chick Heileson	18,644	24.1%
Republican	Russ Mathews	7,452	9.6%
Republican	Katherine Burton	6,214	8.0%
Total votes		77,458	100.0

2010 Idaho's 2nd congressional district election
Party	Candidate	Votes	%
Republican	Mike Simpson (incumbent)	137,468	68.8%
Democratic	Mike Crawford	48,749	24.4%
Independent	Brian Schad	13,500	6.8%
Total votes		199,717	100.0
Republican hold			

=== 2008 ===
2008 Idaho's 2nd congressional district election
Party	Candidate	Votes	%
Republican	Mike Simpson (incumbent)	205,777	70.9%
Democratic	Debbie Holmes	83,878	28.9%
Write-in	Gregory Nemitz	612	0.2%
Total votes		290,267	100.0
Republican hold			

=== 2006 ===
2006 Idaho's 2nd congressional district election
Party	Candidate	Votes	%
Republican	Mike Simpson (incumbent)	132,262	62.0%
Democratic	Jim D. Hansen	73,441	34.4%
Independent	Cameron Forth	5,113	2.4%
Constitution	Travis J. Hedrick	2,516	1.2%
Total votes		213,332	100.0
Republican hold			

=== 2004 ===
2004 Idaho's 2nd congressional district election
Party	Candidate	Votes	%
Republican	Mike Simpson (incumbent)	193,704	70.7%
Democratic	Lin Whitworth	80,133	29.3%
Total votes		273,837	100.0
Republican hold			

=== 2002 ===
2002 Idaho's 2nd congressional district election
Party	Candidate	Votes	%
Republican	Mike Simpson (incumbent)	135,605	68.2%
Democratic	Edward Kinghorn	57,769	29.0%
Libertarian	John A. Lewis	5,508	2.8%
Total votes		198,882	100.0
Republican hold			

=== 2000 ===
2000 Idaho's 2nd congressional district election
Party	Candidate	Votes	%
Republican	Mike Simpson (incumbent)	158,912	70.7%
Democratic	Craig Williams	58,265	25.9%
Libertarian	Donovan Bramwell	7,542	3.4%
Total votes		224,719	100.0
Republican hold			

=== 1998 ===
1998 Idaho's 2nd congressional district election
Party	Candidate	Votes	%
Republican	Mike Simpson	91,337	52.5%
Democratic	Richard Stallings	77,736	44.7%
Natural Law	Jonathan B. Ratner	4,854	2.8%
Total votes		173,927	100.0
Republican gain from Democratic			

== See also ==
- Idaho's 2nd congressional district

Political offices
Preceded by Tom Boyd	Speaker of the Idaho House of Representatives; 1992–1998	Succeeded by Bruce Newcomb
U.S. House of Representatives
Preceded by Mike Crapo	Member of the U.S. House of Representatives from Idaho's 2nd congressional district 1999–present	Incumbent
U.S. order of precedence (ceremonial)
Preceded by Jan Schakowsky	United States representatives by seniority 29th	Succeeded by Mike Thompson
Preceded by Mike Thompson	Order of precedence of the United States	Succeeded by Sam Graves
