= List of Joe Biden 2020 presidential campaign state and territorial legislative endorsements =

This is a list of state and territorial representatives who endorsed Joe Biden's campaign for President of the United States in the 2020 U.S. presidential election.

== Current state and territorial senators ==
=== Alaska Senate ===
- Elvi Gray-Jackson, State Senator from District I (2019–present)
- Scott Kawasaki, State Senator from District A (2019–present)
- Donny Olson, State Senator from District T (2001–present)

=== Arkansas Senate ===
- Will Bond, State Senator from District 32 (2017–2021)
- Linda Chesterfield, State Senator from District 30 (2013–present) and District 34 (2011–2013)

=== California Senate ===
- Bob Archuleta, State Senator from District 32 (2018–present) (Note: Previously endorsed Kamala Harris.)
- Bill Dodd, State Senator from District 3 (2016–present)
- Cathleen Galgiani, State Senator from District 5 (2012–2020)
- Steve Glazer, State Senator from District 7 (2015–present)
- Lena Gonzalez, State Senator from District 33 (2019–present)
- Jerry Hill, State Senator from District 13 (2012–2020)
- Melissa Hurtado, State Senator from District 14 (2018–present)
- Richard Pan, State Senator from District 6 (2014–2022)
- Anthony Portantino, State Senator from District 25 (2016–present)
- Tom Umberg, State Senator from District 34 (2018–present)
- Scott Wiener, State Senator from District 11 (2016–present), San Francisco Supervisor (2011–2016)

=== Colorado Senate ===
- Leroy Garcia, Senate President (2019–2022), State Senator from District 3 (2015–2022)
- Nancy Todd, Senate President pro tempore (2020–2021), State Senator from District 28 (2013–2021)

=== Florida Senate ===
- Lori Berman, State Senator from District 31 (2018–present)
- Gary Farmer, State Senator from District 34 (2016–2022)
- Audrey Gibson, Senate Minority Leader (2018–2020), State Senator from District 6 (2016–2022)
- Jason Pizzo, State Senator from District 38 (2018–present)
- Kevin Rader, State Senator from District 29 (2016–2020)
- José Javier Rodríguez, State Senator from District 37 (2016–2020)
- Perry Thurston, State Senator from District 33 (2016–2022)
- Vic Torres, State Senator from District 15 (2016–present)

=== Georgia Senate ===
- Tonya Anderson, State Senator from District 43 (2017–present)
- Gloria Butler, State Senator from District 55 (1999–present)
- Ed Harbison, State Senator from District 15 (1993–present)
- Donzella James, State Senator from District 35 (2009–present)
- Emanuel Jones, State Senator from District 10 (2005–present)
- Sheila Jones, State Senator from District 5 (2006–present)
- Zahra Karinshak, State Senator from District 48 (2019–2021)
- Sheikh Rahman, State Senator from District 5 (2019–present)

=== Guam Senate ===
- Regine Biscoe Lee, Territorial Senator (2017–2021)
- Tina Rose Muña Barnes, Speaker of the Guam Legislature (2019–2021), territorial Senator (2019–present, 2007–2017, 2003–2005)

=== Hawaii Senate ===
- Rosalyn Baker, State Senator from District 6 (2013–2022), District 5 (2003–2013), and District 4 (1993–1999)
- Stanley Chang, State Senator from District 9 (2017–present)
- Donovan Dela Cruz, State Senator from District 22 (2011–present)
- Lorraine Inouye, State Senator from District 4 (2014–present) and District 1 (1998–2008), Mayor of Hawaii County, HI (1990–1992)
- Gilbert Keith-Agaran, State Senator from District 5 (2013–2023)
- Michelle Kidani, State Senator from District 18 (2013–present) and District 17 (2009–2013)
- Ron Kouchi, President of the Hawaii Senate (2015–present), State Senator from District 8 (2010–present)
- Clarence Nishihara, State Senator from District 17 (2013–2022) and District 18 (2004–2013)
- Laura Thielen, State Senator from District 25 (2013–2020)

=== Idaho Senate ===
- Grant Burgoyne, State Senator from District 16 (2014–2022)
- Janie Ward-Engelking, State Senator from District 18 (2013–present)

=== Indiana Senate ===
- Timothy Lanane, Senate Minority Leader (2008–2020), State Senator from District 25 (1997–present)
- David L. Niezgodski, State Senator from District 10 (2016–present)

=== Iowa Senate ===
- Tony Bisignano, State Senator from District 17 (2015–present)
- Pam Jochum, Senate President (2013–2017), State Senator from District 50 (2013–present)
- Jim Lykam, State Senator from District 45 (2017–present)
- Herman C. Quirmbach, State Senator from District 23 (2003–present)
- Jackie Smith, State Senator from District 7 (2019–2023)

=== Kentucky Senate ===
- Gerald Neal, State Senator from District 33 (1988–present)

=== Louisiana Senate ===
- Regina Barrow, State Senator from District 15 (2016–present) and District 29 (2005–2016)
- Gerald Boudreaux, State Senator from District 24 (2016–present)
- Joseph Bouie Jr., State Senator from District 3 (2020–present)
- Troy Carter, Senate Minority Leader (2016–2021), State Senator from District 7 (2016–2021)
- Jimmy Harris, State Senator from District 4 (2020–present)
- Ed Price, State Senator from District 2 (2017–present)

=== Maryland Senate ===
- Malcolm Augustine, State Senator from District 47 (2019–present) (Note: Citation to reliable independent secondary source needed.)
- Pamela Beidle, State Senator from District 32 (2019–present)
- Joanne C. Benson, State Senator from District 24 (2011–present)
- Arthur Ellis, State Senator from District 28 (2019–present)
- Brian Feldman, State Senator from District 15 (2013–present)
- Melony G. Griffith, State Senator from District 25 (2019–present)
- Guy Guzzone, State Senator from District 13 (2015–present)
- Antonio Hayes, State Senator from District 40 (2019–present)
- Katie Fry Hester, State Senator from District 9 (2019–present)
- Shelly L. Hettleman, State Senator from District 11 (2020–present)
- Cheryl Kagan, State Senator from District 17 (2015–present)
- Delores G. Kelley, State Senator from District 10 (1995–present)
- Nancy J. King, State Senator from District 39 (2007–present)
- Kathy Klausmeier, State Senator from District 8 (2002–present)
- Benjamin F. Kramer, State Senator from District 19 (2019–present)
- Clarence Lam, State Senator from District 12 (2019–present)
- Susan C. Lee, State Senator from District 16 (2015–present)
- Thomas V. Miller Jr., State Senator from District 27 (1983–present)
- Obie Patterson, State Senator from District 26 (2019–present)
- James Rosapepe, State Senator from District 21 (2007–present)
- William C. Smith Jr., State Senator from District 20 (2016–present)
- Charles E. Sydnor III, State Senator from District 44 (2020–present)
- Jeff Waldstreicher, State Senator from District 18 (2019–present)
- Mary L. Washington, State Senator from District 43 (2019–present)
- Ronald N. Young, State Senator from District 3 (2011–present)
- Robert Zirkin, State Senator from District 11 (2007–present)
- Craig Zucker, State Senator from District 14 (2016–present)

=== Massachusetts Senate ===
- Marc Pacheco, Senate President pro tempore (2015–2019), State Senator from Plymouth 1 and Bristol District (1993–present)

=== Michigan Senate ===
- Marshall Bullock, State Senator from District 4 (2019–2023)
- Stephanie Chang, State Senator from District 1 (2019–present)

=== Minnesota Senate ===
- Foung Hawj, State Senator from District 67 (2013–present)

=== Mississippi Senate ===
- Barbara Blackmon, State Senator from District 21 (2016–2024)
- John Horhn, State Senator from District 26 (1993–present)
- Sollie Norwood, State Senator from District 28 (2013–present)
- Derrick Simmons, Senate Minority Leader (2017–present), State Senator from District 12 (2011–present)

=== Missouri Senate ===
- Karla May, State Senator from District 4 (2019–present)
- Jamilah Nasheed, State Senator from District 5 (2013–2021)

=== Nebraska Senate ===
- John S. McCollister, State Senator from District 20 (2015–2023) (Republican)

=== Nevada Senate ===
- Yvanna Cancela, State Senator from District 10 (2016–2021)

=== New Hampshire Senate ===
- Lou D'Allesandro, State Senator from District 20 (1998–present)
- Martha Fuller Clark, Senate President pro tempore (2018–2020), State Senator from District 21 (2012–2020)
- Melanie Levesque, State Senator from District 12 (2018–2020)
- Donna Soucy, Senate President (2018–2020), State Senator from District 18 (2012–present)

=== New Jersey Senate ===
- Dawn Addiego, State Senator from District 8 (2010–2022)
- James Beach, State Senator from District 6 (2009–present)
- Nilsa Cruz-Perez, State Senator from District 5 (2014–present)
- Sandra Bolden Cunningham, State Senator from District 6 (2009–2024)
- Fred Madden, State Senator from District 4 (2004–2024)
- Ronald L. Rice, State Senator from District 28 (1986–2022)
- Teresa Ruiz, State Senator from District 29 (2008–present), President pro tempore of the New Jersey Senate (2018–present)
- Nicholas Sacco, State Senator from District 32 (1994–2024), Mayor of North Bergen, NJ (1991–present)
- Troy Singleton, State Senator from District 7 (2018–present)
- Brian P. Stack, State Senator from District 33 (2008–present), Mayor of Union City, NJ (2000–present)
- Stephen M. Sweeney, Senate President (2010–2022), State Senator from District 3 (2002–2022)

=== New York Senate ===
- Leroy Comrie, State Senator from District 14 (2015–present)
- Timothy M. Kennedy, State Senator from District 58 (2011–2012) and District 63 (2013–2024)
- Monica Martinez, State Senator from District 3 (2019–present)
- Roxanne Persaud, State Senator from District 19 (2015–present), New York State Assemblywoman from District 15 (2015)
- Kevin Thomas, State Senator from District 6 (2019–present)

=== North Carolina Senate ===
- Paul A. Lowe Jr., State Senator from District 32 (2015–present)
- Mujtaba A. Mohammed, State Senator from District 38 (2019–present)
- Sam Searcy, State Senator from District 17 (2019–2020)
- Mike Woodard, State Senator from District 22 (2013–present)

=== Ohio Senate ===
- Hearcel Craig, State Senator from District 15 (2019–present)
- Tina Maharath, State Senator from District 3 (2019–2023)

=== Pennsylvania Senate ===
- Art Haywood, State Senator from District 4 (2015–present)
- Vincent Hughes, State Senator from District 7 (1994–present)
- Katie Muth, State Senator from District 44 (2019–present)
- John Yudichak, State Senator from District 14 (2011–2022), Pennsylvania State Representative (1999–2010) (Independent)

=== Puerto Rico Senate ===
- José Nadal Power, Territorial Senator from San Juan's at-large District (2013–2021)
- Carmelo Ríos Santiago, Senate Majority Leader (2017–2021), Territorial Senator from District 2 (2005–present)

=== Rhode Island Senate ===
- Stephen Archambault, State Senator from District 22 (2013–2023)
- Sandra Cano, State Senator from District 8 (2018–present)
- Frank Ciccone, State Senator from District 7 (2005–present)
- Elizabeth Crowley, State Senator from District 31 (2007–2021)
- Louis DiPalma, State Senator from District 12 (2009–present)
- Frank Lombardi, State Senator from District 26 (2013–present)
- Frank Lombardo, State Senator from District 25 (2011–2024)
- Michael McCaffrey, Senate Majority Leader (2017–2023), State Senator from District 29 (2003–2023)
- Mark McKenney, State Senator from District 30 (2019–2021)
- Ana Quezada, State Senator from District 2 (2017–present)
- James Seveney, State Senator from District 11 (2017–2023)

=== South Carolina Senate ===
- Karl B. Allen, State Senator from District 7 (2012–present)
- Dick Harpootlian, State Senator from District 20 (2018–present)
- Brad Hutto, State Senator from District 40 (1996–present)
- Darrell Jackson, State Senator from District 21 (1992–present)
- Kevin L. Johnson, State Senator from District 36 (2012–present)
- Marlon Kimpson, State Senator from District 42 (2013–2023)
- Margie Bright Matthews, State Senator from District 45 (2015–present)
- John W. Matthews Jr., State Senator from District 39 (1996–2021)
- Thomas McElveen, State Senator from District 35 (2013–present)
- Glenn G. Reese, State Senator from District 11 (1990–2021)
- Vincent Sheheen, State Senator from District 27 (2004–2020)

=== South Dakota Senate ===
- Susan Wismer, State Senator from District 1 (2017–2021), South Dakota State Representative from District 1 (2009–2015)

=== Tennessee Senate ===
- Raumesh Akbari, State Senator from District 29 (2019–present)
- Brenda Gilmore, State Senator from District 19 (2019–2023), Tennessee State Representative (2007–2019)

=== Texas Senate ===
- Juan Hinojosa, State Senator from District 20 (2003–present) (Note: Previously endorsed Julian Castro.)
- Nathan Johnson, State Senator from District 16 (2019–present)
- Jose Menendez, State Senator from District 26 (2015–present)
- Beverly Powell, State Senator from District 10 (2019–2023)

=== Utah Senate ===
- Gene Davis, State Senator from District 13 (1999–2022), Minority Leader of the Utah State Senate (2013–2019)

=== Virginia Senate ===
- John Bell, State Senator from District 13 (2020–2024)
- Lynwood Lewis, State Senator from District 6 (2014–2024)
- Louise Lucas, President pro tempore (2020–present), State Senator from District 18 (1992–present)
- Dick Saslaw, Senate Majority Leader (2020–2024, 2014, 2008–2012), State Senator from District 35 (1980–2024), Senate Minority Leader (2014–2020, 2012–2014, 1998–2008),
- Lionell Spruill, State Senator from District 5 (2017–2024)

=== Washington State Senate ===
- Reuven Carlyle, State Senator from District 36 (2016–2023)
- David Frockt, State Senator from District 46 (2011–2023)
- Jamie Pedersen, State Senator from District 43 (2014–present)
- Lisa Wellman, State Senator from District 41 (2017–present)

=== Wyoming Senate ===
- Mike Gierau, State Senator from District 17 (2019–present), Wyoming State Representative from District 16 (2017–2019)
- Chris Rothfuss, Senate Minority Leader (2013–present), State Senator from District 9 (2011–present)

== Former state and territorial senators ==
=== Alaska Senate ===
- Johnny Ellis, Senate Majority Leader (2009–2011), State Senator (1993–2017), Alaska State Representative (1987–1993)
- Victor Fischer, State Senator (1980–1986)
- Hollis French, Senate Minority Leader (2014–2015), State Senator (2003–2015)
- Berta Gardner, Senate Minority Leader (2015–2019), State Senator from District I (2013–2019), Alaska State Representative from District 24 (2005–2013)
- Albert Kookesh, State Senator from District C (2005–2013)
- Mike Szymanski, State Senator (1987–1990), Alaska State Representative (1983–1986)
- Joe Thomas, State Senator from District D (2007–2013)

=== Arizona Senate ===
- Susan Gerard, State Senator from District 18 (2001–2003) (Republican)

=== California Senate ===
- Art Torres, State Senator from District 84 (1982–1994), Chair of the California Democratic Party (1996–2009)

=== Colorado Senate ===
- Polly Baca, State Senator from District 25 (1979–1987)
- John Morse, Senate President (2013), State Senator (2007–2013)
- Lois Tochtrop, State Senator from District 24 (2007–2015)
- Suzanne Williams, State Senator from District 28 (2004–2011)

=== Florida Senate ===
- Paula Dockery, State Senator from District 15 (2002–2012), Florida State Representative from District 64 (1996–2002) (Republican before 2017, Independent since 2017)
- Rod Smith, State Senator from District 14 (2000–2006), Chair of the Florida Democratic Party (2010–2013)
- Mike Fasano, State Senator (2002–2012), President Pro Tempore of the Florida Senate (2008–2010), House Majority Leader (2000–2001), Florida State Representative from District 36 (2012–2013) and District 45 (1994–2002) (Republican)

=== Guam Senate ===
- Frank Aguon Jr., Territorial Senator (1997–2007, 2009–2011, 2013–2019), Vice Speaker of the Guam Legislature (2003–2005)

=== Hawaii Senate ===
- Robert Bunda, State Senator from District 22 (1994–2010)
- Brickwood Galuteria, State Senator from District 12 (2008–2018), Chair of the Democratic Party of Hawaii (2004)
- Pohai Ryan, State Senator from District 25 (2010–2012)

=== Iowa Senate ===
- Staci Appel, State Senator from District 37 (2007–2011) (previously endorsed Steve Bullock) (Note: Previously endorsed another candidate.)
- Tod Bowman, State Senator from District 29 (2011–2019)
- Gene Fraise, State Senator from District 31 (1986–1993), District 50 (1993–2003) and District 46 (2003–2013)
- Michael Gronstal, State Senator from District 50 (1985–1993, 2003–2013), from District 42 (1993–2003) and District 8 (2013–2017), Senate Democratic Leader (2001–2017), Senate Majority Leader (2007–2017), Senate Minority Leader (2001–2005)
- Steven Hansen, State Senator from District 1 (1995–2003)
- Jack Kibbie, State Senator from District 4 (1993–2013), District 6 (1989–1993), and District 48 (1965–1969)
- Brian Schoenjahn, State Senator from District 12 (2005–2017)

=== Maine Senate ===
- Roger Katz, State Senator from District 15 (2014–2018) (Republican)
- Kevin Raye, President of the Maine Senate (2010–2012), State Senator from District 29 (2004–2012) (Republican)

=== Maryland Senate ===
- John Astle, State Senator from District 30 (1995–2019)
- Stewart W. Bainum Jr., State Senator from District 8 (1983–1998)
- James Brochin, State Senator from District 42 (2003–2019)
- Edward J. Kasemeyer, State Senator from District 12 (1995–2019)
- Gloria Lawlah, State Senator from District 26 (1991–2007)
- Thomas Middleton, State Senator from District 28
- Ida G. Ruben, State Senator from District 20 (1987–2007), President pro tempore of the Maryland State Senate (2000–2007)
- Robert Zirkin, State Senator from District 11 (2007–2020)

=== Massachusetts Senate ===
- Kathleen O'Connor Ives, State Senator from Essex District 1 (2013–2019)

=== Minnesota Senate ===
- Mee Moua, State Senator from District 67 (2002–2011)

=== Missouri Senate ===
- Steve Danner, State Senator from District 28 (1991–1995)

=== Nebraska Senate ===
- Al Davis, State Senator from District 43 (2013–2017) (Republican)

=== Nevada Senate ===
- Greg Brower, State Senator from District 15 (2011–2016), U.S. Attorney for the District of Nevada (2008–2009), Inspector General of the Government Publishing Office (2004–2006) (Republican)
- Bob Coffin, State Senator from Clark District 9 (1982–1986), the Clark 3 Dual-Member District (1986–2002) and Clark District 10 (2002–2010)
- Helen Foley, State Senator (1982–1986)

=== New Hampshire Senate ===
- Sylvia Larsen, State Senator from District 15 (1994–2014), Senate President (2010–2014)
- Bette Lasky, State Senator from District 13 (2008–2010, 2012–2018)
- Deborah Reynolds, State Senator from District 2 (2006–2010)

=== North Carolina Senate ===
- Cal Cunningham, State Senator from District 23 (2001–2003), 2020 nominee for Senate in North Carolina

=== Oklahoma Senate ===
- Angela Monson, Senate Assistant Majority Floor Leader (2003–2005), State Senator from District 48 (1993–2005), Oklahoma State Representative from District 99 (1990–1993)

=== Pennsylvania Senate ===
- Constance H. Williams, State Senator from District 17 (2001–2009)

=== Puerto Rico Senate ===
- Zoé Laboy, Territorial Senator from the at-large district (2017–2019)
- Roberto Prats, Territorial Senator from At-Large District (2000–2004)

=== South Carolina Senate ===
- Phil P. Leventis, State Senator from District 35 (1980–2012)
- Joel Lourie, State Senator from District 22 (2004–2017)
- Tommy Moore, State Senator from District 25 (1981–2006)

=== Tennessee Senate ===
- William Owen, State Senator from District 7 (1985–1991)

=== Texas Senate ===
- Gonzalo Barrientos, State Senator from District 14 (1985–2007)
- Leticia Van de Putte, State Senator from District 26 (1999–2013)

=== Utah Senate ===
- Scott Howell, State Senator from District 8 (1989–2000), Minority Leader (1992–2000)

=== Virginia Senate ===
- Russ Potts, State Senator from District 27 (1992–2008) (Republican)

=== Wisconsin Senate ===
- Jennifer Shilling, Senate Minority Leader (2015–2020), State Senator from District 32 (2011–2020), Wisconsin State Assemblywoman from District 95 (2000–2011)

== Current state and territorial representatives ==
=== Alabama ===
- Christopher J. England, Alabama State Representative from district 70 (2006–present), Chair of the Alabama Democratic Party (2019–present)
- Juandalynn Givan, Alabama State Representative from District 60

=== Alaska ===
- Matt Claman, Alaska State Representative from District 21st (2015–present), Acting Mayor of Anchorage, AK (2009)
- Harriet Drummond, Alaska State Representative from District 18 (2013–present)
- Zack Fields, Alaska State Representative from District 20th (2019–present)
- David Guttenberg, Alaska State Representative from District 8 (2003–present)
- Grier Hopkins, Alaska State Representative from District 4 (2019–present)
- Andy Josephson, Alaska State Representative from District 17th (2012–present)
- Jonathan Kreiss-Tomkins, Alaska State Representative from District 35 (2013–present)
- Chris Tuck, Majority Leader of the Alaska House of Representatives (2017–2019), Alaska State Representative from District 23rd (2009–present)
- Adam Wool, Alaska State Representative from District 5 (2015–present)

=== Arizona ===
- Cesar Chavez, Arizona State Representative from District 29 (2017–present)
- Charlene Fernandez, Minority Leader of the Arizona House of Representatives (2019–present), Arizona State Representative from District 4 (2015–present)
- Alma Hernandez, Arizona State Representative from District 3 (2019–present)
- Lorenzo Sierra, Arizona State Representative from District 19 (2019–present)
- Myron Tsosie, Arizona State Representative from District 7 (2019–present)

=== Arkansas ===
- Andrew Collins, Arkansas State Representative from District 35 (2019–present)
- Fredrick Love, Minority Leader of the Arkansas House of Representatives (2019–present), Arkansas State Representative from District 35 (2011–2013) and District 29 (2014–present)
- Tippi McCullough, Arkansas State Representative from District 33 (2019–present)
- Jamie Scott, Arkansas State Representative from District 37 (2019–present)

=== California ===
- Autumn Burke, California State Assemblywoman from District 62 (2014–present)
- David Chu, California State Representative from District 17 (2014–present)
- Ken Cooley, California State Assemblyman from District 8 (2012–present)
- Jim Cooper, California State Assemblyman from District 9 (2014–present)
- Tom Daly, California State Assemblyman from District 69 (2012–present)
- Mike Gipson, California State Assemblyman from District 64 (2014–present)
- Tim Grayson, California State Assemblyman from District 14 (2016–present)
- Evan Low, California State Representative from the District 28 (2014–present), Mayor of Campbell, California (2010–2014) (previously endorsed Andrew Yang)
- Kevin Mullin, Speaker pro tempore of the California State Assembly (2014–present), California State Assemblyman from District 22 (2012–present)
- Al Muratsuchi, California State Assemblyman from District 66 (2016–present)
- Patrick O'Donnell, California State Assemblyman from District 70 (2014–present)
- Freddie Rodriguez, California State Assemblyman from District 52 (2013–present)

=== Colorado ===
- Adrienne Benavidez, Colorado State Representative from District 32 (2017–present)
- Bri Buentello, Colorado State Representative from District 47 (2019–2021)
- Tracy Kraft-Tharp, Colorado State Representative from District 29 (2013–present)
- Dafna Michaelson Jenet, Colorado State Representative from District 30 (2017–present)
- Dylan Roberts, Colorado State Representative from District 26 (2017–present)

=== Florida ===
- Ramon Alexander, Florida State Representative from District 8 (2016–present)
- Bruce Antone, Florida State Representative from District 46 (2012–present)
- Joseph Casello, Florida State Representative from District 90 (2018–present)
- John Cortes, Florida State Representative from District 43 (2014–present)
- Tracie Davis, Florida State Representative from District 13 (2016–present)
- Fentrice Driskell, Florida State Representative from District 63 (2018–present)
- Nicholas Duran, Florida State Representative from District 112 (2016–present)
- Javier Fernández, Florida State Representative from District 114 (2018–present)
- Joe Geller, Florida State Representative from District 100 (2014–present)
- Michael Gottlieb, Florida State Representative from District 98 (2018–present)
- Michael Grieco, Florida State Representative from District 113 (2018–present)
- Dianne Hart, Florida State Representative from District 61 (2018–present)
- Delores Hogan Johnson, Florida State Representative from District 84 (2018–present)
- Shevrin Jones, Florida State Representative from District 101 (2012–present)
- Amy Mercado, Florida State Representative from District 48 (2016–present)
- Wengay Newton, Florida State Representative from District 70 (2016–present)
- Tina Polsky, Florida State Representative from District 81 (2018–present)
- David Silvers, Florida State Representative from District 87 (2016–present)
- Richard Stark, Florida State Representative from District 104 (2012–present)
- Geraldine Thompson, Florida State Representative from District 44 (2018–present) and District 39 (2006–2012)
- Susan Valdes, Florida State Representative from District 62 (2018–present)
- Barbara Watson, Florida State Representative from District 107 (2012–present) and District 103 (2011–2012)
- Clovis Watson Jr., Florida State Representative from District 20 (2012–present)
- Matt Willhite, Florida State Representative from District 86 (2016–present)

=== Georgia ===
- Kimberly Alexander, Georgia State Representative from District 66 (2012–present)
- Debra Bazemore, Georgia State Representative from District 63 (2017–present)
- Karen Bennett, Georgia State Representative from District 94 (2013–present)
- James Beverly, Georgia State Representative from District 143 (2011–present)
- Roger Bruce, Georgia State Representative from District 61 (2002–present)
- Rhonda Burnough, Georgia State Representative from District 77 (2012–present)
- Park Cannon, Georgia State Representative from District 58 (2016–present)
- Doreen Carter, Georgia State Representative from District 92 (2012–present)
- Sheila Clark Nelson, Georgia State Representative from District 125 (2017–present)
- Pam Dickerson, Georgia State Representative from District 113 (2013–present)
- Karla Drenner, Georgia State Representative from District 85 (2001–present)
- Winfred Dukes, Georgia State Representative from District 154 (1997–present)
- Gloria Frazier, Georgia State Representative from District 126 (2013–present)
- CaMia Hopson, Georgia State Representative from District 153 (2019–present)
- Carolyn Hugley, Georgia State Representative from District 136 (1992–present)
- Mack Jackson, Georgia State Representative from District 128 (2013–present)
- Dar'shun Kendrick, Georgia State Representative from District 93 (2013–present)
- Pedro Marin, Georgia State Representative from District 96 (2005–present)
- Dewey McClain, Georgia State Representative from District 100 (2013–present)
- Billy Mitchell, Georgia State Representative from District 88 (2017–present)
- Miriam Paris, Georgia State Representative from District 142 (2017–present)
- Sam Park, Georgia State Representative from District 101 (2017–present)
- Kim Schofield, Georgia State Representative from District 60 (2017–present)
- Calvin Smyre, Georgia State Representative from District 135 (1974–present)
- Al Williams, Georgia State Representative from District 168 (2002–present)
- Matthew Wilson, Georgia State Representative from District 80 (2019–present)

=== Hawaii ===
- Della Au Belatti, Majority Leader of the Hawaii House of Representatives (2017–present), Hawaii State Representative from District 24 (2013–present) and District 25 (2007–2013)
- Stacelynn Eli, Hawaii State Representative from District 43 (2018–present)
- Sharon Har, Hawaii State Representative from District 42 (2013–present) and District 40 (2007–2013)
- Troy Hashimoto, Hawaii State Representative
- Aaron Johanson, Minority Leader of the Hawaii House of Representatives (2013–2014), Hawaii State Representative from District 31 (2012–present) and District 32 (2010–2012) (Republican before 2014, now Democratic)
- Sam Kong, Hawaii State Representative from District 33 (2014–present)
- Sylvia Luke, Hawaii State Representative from District 25 (2013–present) and District 26 (1999–2013)
- Joey Manahan, Honolulu City Council (2013–present), Hawaii State Representative from District 29 (2007–2013)
- Scot Matayoshi, Hawaii State Representative from District 49 (2019–present)
- John Mizuno, Hawaii State Representative from District 28 (2006–present)
- Mina Morita, Hawaii State Representative from District 14 (1997–present)
- Dee Morikawa, Hawaii State Representative from District 16 (2011–present)
- Nadine Nakamura, Hawaii State Representative
- Takashi Ohno, Hawaii State Representative from District 27 (2013–present)
- Scott Saiki, Speaker of the Hawaii House of Representatives (2017–present), Hawaii State Representative from District 26 (1994–present)
- Gregg Takayama, Hawaii State Representative from District 34 (2013–present)
- Jimmy Tokioka, Hawaii State Representative from District 15 (2007–present)

=== Idaho ===
- Chris Abernathy, Idaho State Representative from District 29 (2018–present)

=== Indiana ===
- John Bartlett, Indiana State Representative from district 95 (2007–present)
- B. Patrick Bauer, Indiana State Representative from district 6 (1970–present), Speaker of the Indiana House of Representatives (2003–2005, 2007–2011)
- Patricia Boy, Indiana State Representative from district 9 (2018–present)
- Chris Chyung, Indiana State Representative from district 15 (2018–present)
- Ed DeLaney, Indiana State Representative from district 86 (2009–present)
- Sue Errington, Indiana State Representative from district 34 (2012–present)
- Phil GiaQuinta, majority leader of the Indiana House of Representatives (2018–present), Indiana State Representative from district 80 (2006–present)
- Terry Goodin, Indiana State Representative from district 66 (2000–present)
- Carey Hamilton, Indiana State Representative from district 87 (2016–present)
- Earl Harris Jr., Indiana State Representative from district 2 (2016–present)
- Ryan Hatfield, Indiana State Representative from district 77 (2016–present)
- Carolyn Jackson, Indiana State Representative from district 1 (2018–present)
- Sheila Klinker, Indiana State Representative from district 27 (1982–present)
- Matt Pierce, Indiana State Representative from district 61 (2002–present)
- Greg Porter, Indiana State Representative from District 96 (1992–present)
- Cherrish Pryor, Indiana State Representative from District 94 (2008–present)
- Robin Shackleford, Indiana State Representative from district 98 (2012–present)
- Vernon Smith, Indiana State Representative from district 14 (1990–present)
- Vanessa Summers, Indiana State Representative from district 99 (1991–present)

=== Iowa ===
- Timi Brown-Powers, Iowa State Representative from District 61 (2015–present)
- Dennis Cohoon, Iowa State Representative from District 87 (1987–present)
- John Forbes, Iowa State Representative from District 40 (2013–present)
- Mary Gaskill, Iowa State Representative from District 81 (2003–present)
- Bruce Hunter, Iowa State Representative from District 34 (2003–present)
- David Jacoby, Iowa State Representative from District 74 (2003–present)
- Tim Kacena, Iowa State Representative from District 14 (2017–present)
- Bob Kressig, Iowa State Representative from District 59 (2005–present)
- Amy Nielsen, Iowa State Representative from District 77 (2017–present) (Note: Previously endorsed Cory Booker.)
- Kirsten Running-Marquardt, Iowa State Representative from District 33 (2009–present)
- Mark Smith, Chair of the Iowa Democratic Party (2020–present), Minority Leader of the Iowa State House of Representatives (2013–2019) and Iowa State Representative from District 71 (2003–present) and District 64 (2001–2003)
- Ras Smith, Iowa State Representative from District 62 (2017–present)

=== Kansas ===
- Barbara Ballard, Minority Leader of the Kansas House of Representatives (2015–present), Kansas State Representative (1993–present)
- Stephanie Clayton Kansas State Representative from District 19 (2013–present) (former Republican, Democrat since 2018)

=== Louisiana ===
- Barbara Carpenter, Louisiana State Representative from District 58 (2016–present)
- Randal Gaines, Louisiana State Representative from District 57 (2012–present)
- Jason Hughes, Louisiana State Representative from District 100 (2020–present)
- C. Travis Johnson, Louisiana State Representative from District 21 (2020–present)
- Rodney Lyons, Louisiana State Representative from District 87 (2016–present)
- C. Denise Marcelle, Louisiana State Representative from District 61 (2016–present)
- Vincent Pierre, Louisiana State Representative from District 44 (2012–present)
- Larry Selders, Louisiana State Representative from District 67 (2020–present)

=== Maine ===
- Sara Gideon, 2020 nominee for Senate, Speaker of the Maine House of Representatives (2016–2020)
- Craig Hickman, Maine State Representative from District 82 (2012–present)

=== Maryland ===
- Vanessa Atterbeary, Maryland State Delegate from District 13 (2015–present)
- Erek Barron, Maryland State Delegate from District 24 (2015–present)
- J. Sandy Bartlett, Maryland State Delegate from District 32 (2019–present)
- Kumar P. Barve, Maryland State Delegate from District 17 (1991–present)
- Lisa Belcastro, Maryland State Delegate from District 11 (2020–present)
- Harry Bhandari, Maryland State Delegate from District 8 (2019–present)
- Benjamin Brooks, Maryland State Delegate from District 10 (2015–present)
- Brian M. Crosby, Maryland State Delegate from District 29B (2019–present)
- Bonnie Cullison, Maryland State Delegate from District 19 (2011–present)
- Dereck E. Davis, Maryland State Delegate from District 25 (1995–present)
- Eric Ebersole, Maryland State Delegate from District 12 (2015–present)
- Jessica Feldmark, Maryland State Delegate from District 12 (2019–present)
- Wanika B. Fisher, Maryland State Delegate from District 47 (2019–present)
- Cathi Forbes, Maryland State Delegate from District 42A (2019–present)
- James W. Gilchrist, Maryland State Delegate from District 17 (2007–present)
- Michele Guyton, Maryland State Delegate from District 42B (2019–present)
- Andrea Harrison, Maryland State Delegate from District 24 (2019–present)
- Anne Healey, Maryland State Delegate from District 22 (1991–present)
- Marvin E. Holmes Jr., Maryland State Delegate from District 23B (2003–present)
- Carolyn J. B. Howard, Maryland State Delegate from District 24 (1991–present, 1988–1990)
- Carl W. Jackson, Maryland State Delegate from District 8 (2019–present)
- Michael A. Jackson, Maryland State Delegate from District 27B(2014–present)
- Adrienne A. Jones, Speaker of the Maryland House of Delegates (2019–present), Maryland State Delegate from District 10 (1997–present)
- Anne Kaiser, Maryland State Delegate from District 14 (2003–present)
- Ariana Kelly, Maryland State Delegate from District 16 (2011–present)
- Ken Kerr, Maryland State Delegate from District 3B (2019–present)
- Marc Korman, Maryland State Delegate from District 16 (2015–present)
- Mary A. Lehman, Maryland State Delegate from District 21 (2019–present)
- Jazz Lewis, Maryland State Delegate from District 24 (2017–present)
- Karen Lewis Young, Maryland State Delegate from District 3A (2015–present)
- Robbyn Lewis, Maryland State Delegate from District 46 (2017–present)
- Brooke Lierman, Maryland State Delegate from District 46 (2015–present)
- Mary Ann Lisanti, Maryland State Delegate from District 34A (2015–present)
- Sara N. Love, Maryland State Delegate from District 16 (2019–present)
- Maggie McIntosh, Maryland State Delegate from District 43 (2003–present)
- Edith J. Patterson, Maryland State Delegate from District 28 (2015–present)
- Joseline Peña-Melnyk, Maryland State Delegate from District 21 (2007–present)
- Shane Pendergrass, Maryland State Delegate from District 13 (1995–present)
- Susie Proctor, Maryland State Delegate from District 27A (2015–present)
- Lily Qi, Maryland State Delegate from District 15 (2019–present)
- Kirill Reznik, Maryland State Delegate from District 39 (2007–present)
- Samuel I. Rosenberg, Maryland State Delegate from District 41 (1983–present)
- Sheree Sample-Hughes, Speaker pro tempore of the Maryland House of Delegates (2019–present), Maryland State Delegate from District 37A (2015–present)
- Emily Shetty, Maryland State Delegate from District 18 (2019–present)
- Stephanie M. Smith, Maryland State Delegate from District 45 (2019–present)
- Dana Stein, Maryland State Delegate from District 11 (2007–present) and 2002–2003
- Veronica L. Turner, Maryland State Delegate from District 26 (2019–present)
- Kris Valderrama, Maryland State Delegate from District 26 (2007–present)
- Geraldine Valentino-Smith, Maryland State Delegate from District 23A (2011–present)
- Courtney Watson, Maryland State Delegate from District 9B (2019–present)
- Ron Watson, Maryland State Delegate from District 23B (2019–present)
- Jheanelle Wilkins, Maryland State Delegate from District 20 (2017–present)
- Nicole A. Williams, Maryland State Delegate from District 22 (2019–present)
- Pat Young, Maryland State Delegate from District 44B (2015–present)

=== Massachusetts ===
- Brian Ashe, Massachusetts State Representative from Hampden District 2
- Gerard Cassidy, Massachusetts State Representative from Plymouth District 9 (2016–present)
- Claire D. Cronin, Massachusetts State Representative from Plymouth District 11 (2013–present)
- Mark Cusack, Massachusetts State Representative from Norfolk District 5 (2011–present)
- Josh S. Cutler, Massachusetts State Representative from Plymouth District 6 (2013–present)
- Mike Day, Massachusetts State Representative from Middlesex District 31 (2015–present)
- Paul Donato, Massachusetts State Representative from Middlesex District 35 (2001–present)
- Carole Fiola, Massachusetts State Representative from Bristol District 6 (2013–present)
- Richard Haggerty, Massachusetts State Representative from Middlesex District 30 (2019–present)
- Christopher Hendricks, Massachusetts State Representative from Bristol District 11 (2018–present)
- Louis Kafka, Massachusetts State Representative from Norfolk District 8 (1991–present)
- Patrick J. Kearney, Massachusetts State Representative from Plymouth District 4 (2019–present)
- Kathleen LaNatra, Massachusetts State Representative from Plymouth District 12 (2019–present)
- John J. Lawn, Massachusetts State Representative from Middlesex District 10 (2011–present)
- Christopher Markey, Massachusetts State Representative from Bristol District 9 (2011–present)
- David Nangle, Massachusetts State Representative from Middlesex District 17 (1999–present)
- Jerry Parisella, Massachusetts State Representative from Essex District 6 (2011–present, 1987–1995)
- John H. Rogers, Massachusetts State Representative from Norfolk District 12 (1992–present)
- Angelo Scaccia, Massachusetts State Representative from Suffolk District 14 from (1981–present, 1973–1978)
- Alan Silvia, Massachusetts State Representative from Bristol District 7 (2013–present)
- Thomas M. Stanley, Massachusetts State Representative from Middlesex District 10 (2018–present)
- Paul Tucker, Massachusetts State Representative from Essex District 7 (2015–present)
- Thomas Walsh, Massachusetts State Representative from Essex District 12 (2016–present)
- Jonathan Zlotnik, Massachusetts State Representative from Worcester District 2 (2013–present)

=== Michigan ===
- Tyrone Carter, Michigan State Representative District 6 (2019–present)
- Cynthia Neeley, Michigan State Representative from District 34 (2019–present)
- Joe Tate, Michigan State Representative from District 2 (2018–present)
- Karen Whitsett, Michigan State Representative from District 9 (2019–present)
- Tenisha Yancey, Michigan State Representative from District 1 (2017–present)

=== Minnesota ===
- Rena Moran, Minnesota State Representative from District 65A (2011–present)

=== Mississippi ===
- Christopher Bell, Mississippi State Representative from District 65 (2016–present)
- Edward Blackmon Jr., Mississippi State Representative from District 57 (1984–present)
- Cedric Burnett, Mississippi State Representative from District 9 (2016–present)
- Carl L. Mickens, Mississippi State Representative from District 42 (2016–present)
- Kenneth Walker, Mississippi State Representative from District 27 (2016–present)

=== Missouri ===
- LaDonna Appelbaum, Missouri State Representative from District 71 (2019–present)
- Jerome Barnes, Missouri State Representative from District 28 (2016–present)
- Doug Beck, Missouri State Representative from District 92 (2017–present)
- Ashley Bland Manlove, Missouri State Representative from District 26 (2019–present)
- Alan Gray, Missouri State Representative from District 75 (2016–present)
- Alan Green, Missouri State Representative from District 67 (2014–present)
- Trish Gunby, Missouri State Representative from District 99 (2019–present)
- Keri Ingle, Missouri State Representative from District 35 (2019–present)
- Wiley Price IV, Missouri State Representative from District 84 (2019–present)
- Wes Rogers, Missouri State Representative from District 18 (2019–present)
- Rory Rowland, Missouri State Representative from District 29 (2016–present)
- Joe Runions, Missouri State Representative from District 37 (2013–present)
- Robert Sauls, Missouri State Representative from District 21 (2019–present)
- Sarah Unsicker, Missouri State Representative from District 91 (2017–present)
- Yolanda Young, Missouri State Representative from District 22 (2019–present)

=== Nevada ===
- Shannon Bilbray-Axelrod, Nevada State Assemblyman from District 34 (2016–present)
- Ozzie Fumo, Nevada State Assemblyman from District 21 (2016–present)
- Susie Martinez, Nevada State Assemblywoman from District 13 (2019–present)
- Dina Neal, Nevada State Assemblywoman from District 7 (2010–present)
- Selena Torres, Nevada State Assemblywoman from District 3 (2018–present) (previously co-endorsed Cory Booker and Julian Castro)

=== New Hampshire ===
- Anita Burroughs, New Hampshire State Representative from Carroll District 1 (2018–present)
- Jacqueline Cali-Pitts, New Hampshire State Representative from Rockingham District 30 (1998–present)
- John Cloutier, New Hampshire State Representative from Sullivan District 10 (1992–present)
- Patricia Cornell, New Hampshire State Representative from Hillsborough District 18 (2014–present)
- David Cote, New Hampshire State Representative from Hillsborough District 31 (1982–present)
- Tim Egan, New Hampshire State Representative from Grafton District 2 (2018–present)
- Barrett Faulkner, New Hampshire State Representative from Cheshire District 12 (2016–present)
- Mary Freitas, New Hampshire State Representative from Hillsborough District 14 (2014–present)
- Jaci Grote, New Hampshire State Representative from Rockingham District 24 (2018–present)
- Cathryn Harvey, New Hampshire State Representative from Cheshire District 1 (2018–present)
- David Huot, New Hampshire State Representative from Belknap District 3 from (2018–present, 2012–2014)
- Richard Komi, New Hampshire State Representative from Hillsborough District 43 (2018–present)
- Patricia Lovejoy, New Hampshire State Representative from Rockingham District 36 (2010–present)
- Howard Moffett, New Hampshire State Representative from Merrimack District 9 (2019–present)
- Megan Murray, New Hampshire State Representative from Hillsborough District 22 (2018–present)
- Laura Pantelakos, New Hampshire State Representative from Rockingham District 25 (1978–present)
- Julie Radhakrishnan, New Hampshire State Representative from Hillsborough District 22 (2018–present)
- Beth Rodd, New Hampshire State Representative from Merrimack District 6 (2016–present)
- Denny Ruprecht, New Hampshire State Representative from Grafton District 15 (2018–present)
- Catt Sandler, New Hampshire State Representative from Strafford District 21 (2016–present)
- Steve Shurtleff, Speaker of the New Hampshire House of Representatives (2018–present), New Hampshire State Representative from Merrimack District 11 (2004–present)
- Charlie St. Clair, New Hampshire State Representative from Belknap District 9 (2017–present)
- Mark Vallone, New Hampshire State Representative from Rockingham District 9 (2018–present)
- Ken Vincent, New Hampshire State Representative from Strafford District 17 (2016–present)
- Janet Wall, New Hampshire State Representative from Strafford District 6 (1986–present)
- Kermit Williams, New Hampshire State Representative from Hillsborough District 4 (2012–present)

=== New Jersey ===
- John Armato, New Jersey State Assemblyman from District 2 (2018–present)
- John J. Burzichelli, New Jersey State Assemblyman from District 3 (2002–present)
- Annette Chaparro, New Jersey State Assemblyman from District 33 (2016–present)
- Nicholas Chiaravalloti, New Jersey State Assemblyman from District 31 (2016–present)
- Herb Conaway, New Jersey State Assemblyman from District 7 (1998–present)
- Louis Greenwald, Majority Leader of the New Jersey General Assembly (2012–present), New Jersey State Assemblyman from District 6 (1996–present)
- Angelica M. Jimenez, New Jersey State Assemblyman from District 32 (2012–present)
- Pamela Rosen Lampitt, New Jersey State Assemblywoman from District 6 (2006–present)
- Vince Mazzeo, New Jersey State Assemblyman from District 2 (2014–present)
- Angela V. McKnight, New Jersey State Assemblyman from District 31 (2016–present)
- Pedro Mejia, New Jersey State Assemblyman from District 32 (2018–present)
- Bill Moen, New Jersey State Assemblyman from District 5 (2020–present)
- Gabriela Mosquera, New Jersey State Assemblywoman from District 4 (2012–present)
- Paul D. Moriarty, New Jersey State Assemblyman from District 4 (2006–present)
- Raj Mukherji, Majority Whip of the New Jersey General Assembly, New Jersey State Assemblywoman from District 33 (2014–present)
- Carol A. Murphy, New Jersey State Assemblywoman from District 7 (2018–present)
- William Spearman, New Jersey State Assemblyman from District 5 (2018–present)
- Adam Taliaferro, New Jersey State Assemblyman from District 3 (2015–present)

=== New Mexico ===
- Sheryl Williams Stapleton, Majority Leader of the New Mexico House of Representatives (2017–present), New Mexico State Representative from District 19 (1995–present)

=== North Carolina ===
- Terry Garrison, North Carolina State Representative from District 32 (2016–present)

=== North Dakota ===
- Joshua Boschee, North Dakota State Representative from District 44 (2012–present), Minority Leader of the North Dakota House of Representatives (2018–present) (Note: Previously endorsed Pete Buttigieg.)

=== Ohio ===
- Kristin Boggs, Ohio State Representative from District 18 (2016–present)
- Randi Clites, Ohio State Representative from District 75 (2019–present)
- Jeffrey Crossman, Ohio State Representative from District 15 (2019–present)
- Tavia Galonski, Ohio State Representative from District 35 (2017–present)
- Michele Lepore-Hagan, Ohio State Representative from District 58 (2015–present)
- Mary Lightbody, Ohio State Representative from District 19 (2019–present)
- Jessica Miranda, Ohio State Representative from District 28 (2019–present)
- Bride Rose Sweeney, Ohio State Representative from District 14 (2018–present)
- Allison Russo, Ohio State Representative from District 24 (2019–present)
- Lisa Sobecki, Ohio State Representative from District 45 (2019–present)

=== Oklahoma ===
- Jason Dunnington, Oklahoma State Representative from District 88 (2015–present)
- Ben Loring, Oklahoma State Representative from District 7 (2015–present)
- Jason Lowe, Oklahoma State Representative from District 97
- Ajay Pittman, Oklahoma State Representative from District 99 (2018–present)
- David Perryman, Minority Floor Leader of the Oklahoma House of Representatives (2016–present), Oklahoma State Representative from District 56 (2013–present)

=== Pennsylvania ===
- Morgan Cephas, Pennsylvania State Representative from District 192 (2017–present)
- Jason Dawkins, Pennsylvania State Representative from District 179 (2015–present)
- Mary Jo Daley, Pennsylvania State Representative from District 148 (2013–present), Narberth Borough Councilor (1992–2012)
- Malcolm Kenyatta, Pennsylvania State Representative from District 181 (2019–present)

=== Puerto Rico ===
- José Aníbal Díaz, Puerto Rico Territorial Representative from District 29 (2015–2023)
- Javier Aponte Dalmau, Puerto Rico Territorial Representative from District 38 (2013–present)
- Carlos Bianchi Angleró, Puerto Rico Territorial Representative from District 20 (2013–2020)
- Tatito Hernández, Minority Leader of the Puerto Rico House of Representatives (2017–present), Puerto Rico Territorial Representative from District 11 (2009–present)
- Angel Matos García, Puerto Rico Territorial Representative from District 40 (2013–present)
- Luis Ortiz Lugo, Puerto Rico Territorial Representative from District 30 (2013–present)
- Che Pérez Cordero, Puerto Rico Territorial Representative from District 18 (2017–present)
- Conny Varela, Puerto Rico Territorial Representative from District 32 (1997–present)

=== Rhode Island ===
- Gregg Amore, Rhode Island State Representative from District 65 (2013–present)
- Jean Philippe Barros, Rhode Island State Representative from District 59 (2017–present)
- Dennis Canario, Rhode Island State Representative from District 71 (2013–present)
- Stephen Casey, Rhode Island State Representative from District 50 (2013–present)
- Julie Casimiro, Rhode Island State Representative from District 31 (2014–present)
- Grace Diaz, Rhode Island State Representative from District 11 (2005–present)
- John Edwards, Rhode Island State Representative from District 70 (2009–present)
- Robert Jacquard, Rhode Island State Representative from District 17 (2003–present)
- ~~Nicholas Mattiello, Speaker of the Rhode Island House of Representatives (2014–present), Rhode Island State Representative from District 15 (2007–present)~~ (switched endorsement to Amy Klobuchar in January 2020)
- Joseph McNamara, Rhode Island State Representative from District 19 (2003–present) and District 29 (1995–2003), Chair of the Rhode Island Democratic Party (2014–present)
- Mary Messier, Rhode Island State Representative from District 62 (2009–present)
- Michael Morin, Rhode Island State Representative from District 49 (2014–present)
- William O'Brien, Rhode Island State Representative from District 54 (2013–present)
- Robert Phillips, Rhode Island State Representative from District 51 (2011–present)
- Joe Serodio, Rhode Island State Representative from District 64 (2018–present)
- Carlos Tobon, Rhode Island State Representative from District 58 (2014–present)
- Anastasia P. Williams, Rhode Island State Representative from District 9 (1993–present)

=== South Carolina ===
- Carl Anderson, South Carolina State Representative from District 103 (2005–present)
- Jimmy Bales, South Carolina State Representative from District 80 (1999–present)
- Beth Bernstein, South Carolina State Representative from District 78 (2012–present)
- Robert Brown, South Carolina State Representative from District 116 (2001–present)
- Bill Clyburn, South Carolina State Representative from District 82 (1995–present)
- Joseph H. Jefferson, South Carolina State Representative from District 102 (2004–present)
- Roger Kirby, South Carolina State Representative from District 61 (2014–present)
- David Mack, South Carolina State Representative from District 109 (1997–present)
- Marvin Pendarvis, South Carolina State Representative from District 113 (2017–present) (previously endorsed Beto O'Rourke)
- Leon Stavrinakis, South Carolina State Representative from District 119 (2007–present)
- J. David Weeks, South Carolina State Representative from District 51 (2000–present)
- Will Wheeler, South Carolina State Representative from District 50 (2016–present)
- Robert Q. Williams, South Carolina State Representative from District 62 (2007–present)

=== South Dakota ===
- Ryan Cwach, South Dakota State Representative from District 18 (2018–present)
- Linda Duba, South Dakota State Representative from District 15 (2019–present)
- Steve McCleerey, South Dakota State Representative from District 1 (2015–present)
- Ray Ring, South Dakota State Representative from District 17 (2013–present)

=== Tennessee ===
- Jesse Chism, Tennessee State Representative from District 85 (2018–present)
- Barbara Cooper, Tennessee State Representative from District 86 (1996–present)
- Vincent Dixie, Tennessee State Representative from District 54 (2019–present)
- Bob Freeman, Tennessee State Representative from District 56 (2019–present)
- Yusuf Hakeem, Tennessee State Representative from District 28 (2018–present)
- Jason Hodges, Tennessee State Representative from District 67 (2018–present)
- Harold M. Love Jr., Assistant Minority Leader of the Tennessee House of Representatives (2019–present), Tennessee State Representative from District 58 (2013–present)

=== Texas ===
- Rafael Anchia, Texas State Representative from District 103 (2005–present)
- Rhetta Bowers, Texas State Representative from District 113 (2019–present)
- Garnet Coleman, Texas State Representative from District 147 (1991–present)
- Barbara Gervin-Hawkins, Texas State Representative from District 120 (2017–present)
- Ryan Guillen, Texas State Representative from District 31 (2003–present)
- Oscar Longoria, Texas State Representative from District 35 (2013–present)
- Eddie Lucio III, Texas State Representative from District 38 (2007–present)
- Armando Martinez, Texas State Representative from District 39 (2005–present)
- Victoria Neave, Texas State Representative from District 107 (2017–present)
- Chris Turner, Minority Leader of the Texas House of Representatives (2017–present) and Texas State Representative from District 101 (2013–present)
- John Turner, Texas State Representative from District 114 (2019–present)

=== Utah ===
- Susan Duckworth, Utah State Representative from District 22 (2009–present)

=== Virginia ===
- Alex Askew, Virginia State Delegate from District 85 (2020–present)
- Hala Ayala, Virginia State Delegate from District 51 (2018–present)
- Lamont Bagby, Virginia State Delegate from District 74 (2015–present)
- Eileen Filler-Corn, Speaker of the Virginia House of Delegates (2020–present), Minority Leader of the Virginia House of Delegates (2019–2020), Virginia State Delegate from District 41 (2010–present)
- Elizabeth Guzmán, Virginia State Delegate from District 31 (2018–present)
- Cliff Hayes Jr., Virginia State Delegate from District 77 (2017–present)
- Dan Helmer, Virginia State Delegate from District 40 (2020–present)
- Joseph Lindsey, Virginia State Delegate from District 90 (2014–present)
- Alfonso H. Lopez, Virginia State Delegate from District 49 (2012–present)
- Delores McQuinn, Virginia State Delegate from District 70 (2009–present)
- Martha Mugler, Virginia State Delegate from District 91 (2020–present).
- Kathleen Murphy, Virginia State Delegate from District 34 (2015–present)
- Danica Roem, Virginia State Delegate for District 13 (2018–present)
- Ibraheem Samirah, Virginia State Delegate from District 86 (2019–present)
- Mark Sickles, Virginia State Delegate from District 43 (2004–present)
- Roslyn Tyler, Virginia State Delegate from District 75 (2006–present)

=== Washington ===
- Steve Bergquist, Washington State Representative from District 11 (2013–present)
- Jake Fey, Washington State Representative from District 27 (2013–present)
- Eric Pettigrew, Washington State Representative from District 37 (2003–present)
- Cindy Ryu, Washington State Representative from District 32 (2011–present)
- Larry Springer, Washington State Representative from District 45 (2004–present)
- My-Linh Thai, Washington State Representative from District 41 (2019–present)
- Steve Tharinger, Washington State Representative from District 24 (2011–present)

=== Wisconsin ===
- Jason Fields, Wisconsin State Assemblyman from District 11 (2017–present)
- Gordon Hintz, Minority Leader of the Wisconsin State Assembly (2017–present), Wisconsin State Assemblyman from District 54 (2007–present)

=== Wyoming ===
- Stan Blake, Wyoming State Representative from District 39 (2007–present)
- Sara Burlingame, Wyoming State Representative from District 44 (2019–present)
- Andi Clifford, Wyoming State Representative from District 33 (2019–present)
- Cathy Connolly, Minority Leader of the Wyoming House of Representatives (2017–present), Wyoming State Representative from District 13 (2009–present)
- JoAnn Dayton-Selman, Wyoming State Representative from District 17 (2015–present)
- John Freeman, Wyoming State Representative from District 60 (2011–present)
- Charles Pelkey, Wyoming State Representative from District 45 (2015–present)
- Andy Schwartz, Wyoming State Representative from District 23 (2015–present)

== Former state and territorial representatives ==
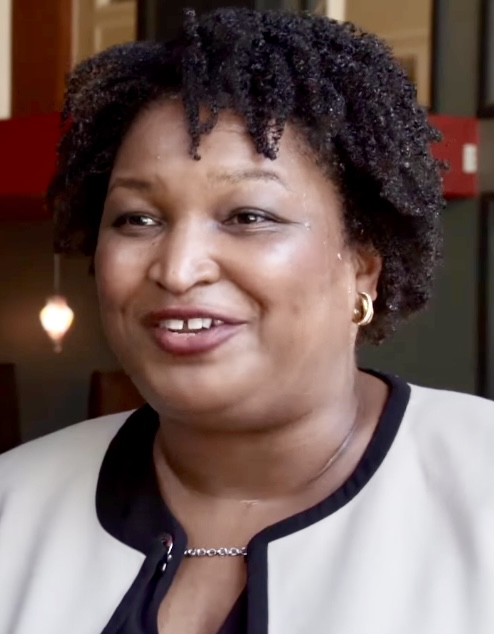
Stacey Abrams

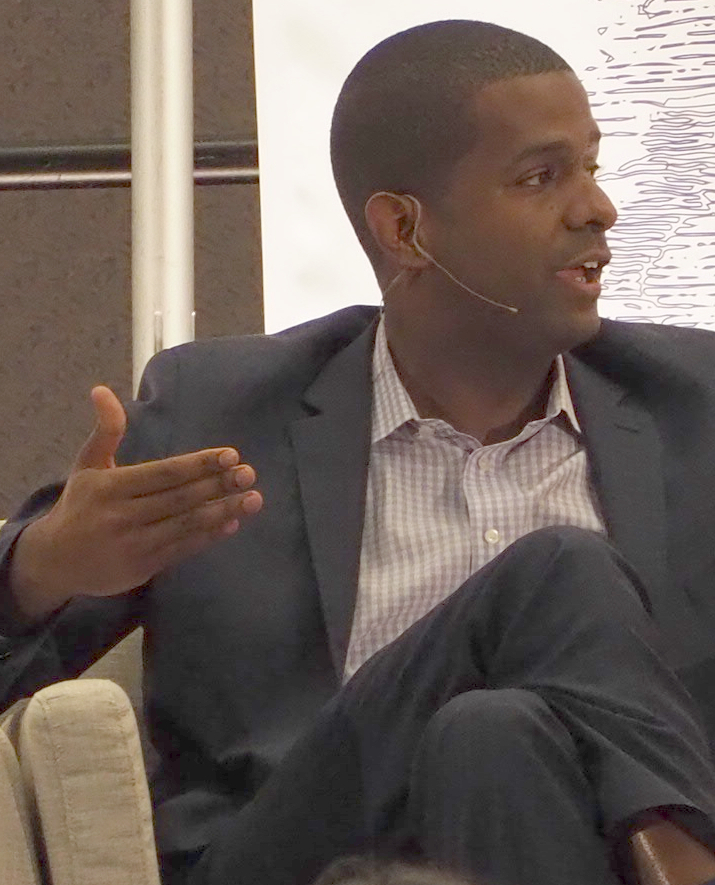
Bakari Sellers

- Stacey Abrams, founder of Fair Fight Action, 2018 nominee for Governor of Georgia, Minority Leader of the Georgia House of Representatives (2011–2017), Georgia State Representative from District 89 (2013–2017) and District 84 (2007–2013)
- Roberto Alonzo, Texas State Representative from District 104 (1993–2019)
- Elliot Anderson, Nevada State Assemblyman from District 15 (2011–2019)
- Robert Asencio, Florida State Representative from District 118 (2016–2018)
- Demetrius Atsalis, Massachusetts State Representative from Barnstable District 2 (1999–2013)
- Dick Batchelor, Florida State Representative from District 43 (1974–1982)
- Aundre Bumgardner, Connecticut State Representative from District 41 (2015–2017) (former Republican, Democrat since 2017)
- Ethan Berkowitz, Mayor of Anchorage, Alaska (2015–2020), Member of Alaska House of Representatives from District 26 (2003–2007) and 13 (1997–2003)
- Bill Bowles, Massachusetts State Representative from Bristol District 2 (2009–2011)
- Aisha Braveboy, Maryland State Delegate from District 25 (2007–2015)
- Douglas Bremner, Nevada State Assemblyman from Clark County, NV (1972–1984)
- Ronald Brisé, Florida State Representative from District 108 (2006–2010)
- Eric M. Bromwell, Maryland State Delegate from District 8 (2003–2019)
- Kay Brown, Alaska State Representative
- Alice J. Cain, Maryland State Delegate from District 30A (2019–2020)
- Ed Cannaday, Oklahoma State Representative from District 15 (2007–2019)
- Galen R. Clagett, Maryland State Delegate from District 3A (2003–2015)
- Virginia P. Clagett, Maryland State Delegate from District 30 (1995–2011)
- Marcus Conklin, Nevada State Assemblyman from District 37 (2003–2012), Majority Floor Leader of the Nevada State Assembly (2010–2012)
- Gene Counihan, Maryland State Delegate from District 15
- Geraldine Creedon, Massachusetts State Representative from Plymouth District 11 (1995–2012)
- Ginger Crocker, South Carolina State Representative from Laurens County, SC (1978–1984)
- Eric Croft, Alaska State Representative from District 15 (1997–2006)
- Jim Cunneen, California State Assemblymember from District 24 (1994–2000) (Republican)
- C. Richard D'Amato, Maryland State Delegate from District 30 (1999–2003)
- Jim Dillard, Virginia State Delegate from District 41 (1983–2005) (Republican)
- Mike Eng, California State Assemblymember from District 49 (2006–2012)
- Ted Farnen, Missouri State Representative (1995–2003)
- Jim Felder, South Carolina State Representative (1970–1972)
- Robert Fennell, Massachusetts State Representative from Essex District 10 (1995–2016)
- John V. Fernandes, Massachusetts State Representative from Worcester District 10
- Armando Franco, Puerto Rico Territorial Representative from District 17 (2013–2017)
- Beth Fukumoto, Minority Leader of the Hawaii House of Representatives, Hawaii State Representative from District 36 (2013–2018), Acting Chair of the Hawaii Republican Party (2011) (Republican until 2017, Democratic 2017–present)
- Les Gara, Alaska State Representative from District 23 (2003–2019)
- Gilbert Genn, Maryland State Delegate from District 16
- John R. Gregg, Speaker of the Indiana House of Representatives (1996–2003), Indiana State Representative from district 45 (1987–2003)
- Deb Gullett, Arizona State Representative from District 11 (2003–2005) (Republican)
- Christina Hale, Indiana State Representative from district 87 (2012–2016)
- Neil Hansen, Utah State Representative from District 9 (1998–2014)
- Doug Hart, Michigan State Representative from District 73 (1999–2005) (Republican)
- Elfreda Higgins, Idaho State Representative (2008–2012)
- Dana Hilliard, New Hampshire State Representative (1993–1997, 2005–2008)
- William Horne, Nevada State Assemblyman from District 15 (2003–2015), Majority Leader of the Nevada State Assembly (2011)
- John Hurson, Maryland State Delegate from District 18
- Scott Inman, Minority Leader of the Oklahoma House of Representatives (2010–2017), Oklahoma State Representative from District 94 (2006–2019)
- Charles Jeter, North Carolina Representative from District 92 (2013–2016) (Republican)
- Becky Jordan, Arizona State Representative from District 22 (1993–1996) (Republican)
- Ruth Kagi, Washington State Representative from District 32 (1999–2019)
- Jerry Kearns, Iowa State Representative from District 90 (2009–2019)
- Beth Kerttula, Minority Leader of the Alaska House of Representatives (2007–2014), Alaska State Representative from District 3 (1999–2014)
- Hy Kloc, Idaho State Representative from District 16 Seat B (2012–2018)
- Mickey Knight, Michigan State Representative from District 96 (1981–1993) (Republican)
- Steve Kouplen, Minority Leader of the Oklahoma House of Representatives (2017–2019), Oklahoma State Representative from District 24 (2009–2019)
- Paul Kujawski, Massachusetts State Representative from Worcester District 8 (1994–2011)
- Peter J. Larkin, Massachusetts State Representative from Berkshire District 1 (1991–2005)
- Marilyn Lee, Hawaii State Representative from District 38 (1996–2012)
- James Lockhart, Oklahoma State Representative from District 3 (2011–2017)
- Bobby Mathieson, Virginia State Delegate from District 21 (2008–2010).
- David Maturen, Michigan State Representative from District 63 (2015–2019) (Republican)
- Frank McBride, South Carolina State Representative from District 74 (1985–1991)
- Jeannie McDaniel, Assistant Minority Floor Leader of the Oklahoma House of Representatives (2014–2017), Oklahoma State Representative from District 78 (2005–2017)
- Joe Miklosi, Colorado State Representative from District 9 (2007–2013)
- Kate Miller, New Hampshire State Representative from Belknap District 3 (2008–2010)
- Vida Miller, South Carolina State Representative from District 108 (1996–2010)
- Harold Mitchell Jr., South Carolina State Representative from District 31 (2005–2017)
- David Morihara, Hawaii State Representative
- S. Floyd Mori, California State Assemblymember from District 15 (1975–1981)
- John Murphy, Massachusetts State Representative
- Richard E. Myers, Iowa State Representative from District 30 (1993–1995, 2003) and District 49 (1995–2003)
- Mike Navarre, Majority Leader of the Alaska House of Representatives (1989–1991), Alaska State Representative from District 5A (1985–1993), District 9 (1993–1996)
- Jim Nordlund, Alaska State Representative from District 11 (1993–1994)
- Barbara Norton, Louisiana State Representative from District 3 (2008–2020)
- Rhonda Nyman, Massachusetts State Representative from Plymouth District 5 (2011–2015)
- Dennis O'Brien, Speaker of the Pennsylvania House of Representatives from (2007–2008), Pennsylvania State Representative from District 169 (1983–2012, 1977–1980) (Republican)
- John Oceguera, Nevada State Assemblyman from Clark District 16 (2000–2012), Speaker of the Nevada State Assembly (2011–2013)
- Richard Perkins, Nevada State Assemblyman from District 23 (1992–2006), Speaker of the Nevada State Assembly (2002–2006)
- Natalie Phelps Finnie, Illinois State Representative from District 118 (2017–2019)
- Roberto Prats, Puerto Rico Territorial Representative from the at-large district (2000–2004)
- Douglas Prescott, New York State Assemblyman from District 26 (1991–1997) and District 25 (1985–1991, 1981–1983) (Republican)
- Eric Proctor, Oklahoma State Representative from District 77 (2007–2019)
- Neil F. Quinter, Maryland State Delegate (2003–2007)
- John Ravitz, New York State Assemblyman from District 73 (1993–2002) and District 66 (1991–1992) (Republican)
- Brian Renegar, Oklahoma State Representative from District 17 (2006–2018)
- Joe Rice, Colorado State Representative from District 38 (2007–2011)
- Justin Rodriguez, Texas State Representative from District 125 (2013–2019)
- Brian D. Rogers, Alaska State Representative (1979–1983)
- Paul Rosenthal, Colorado State Representative from District 9 (2013–2019)
- Jeffrey Sanchez, Massachusetts State Representative from Suffolk/Norfolk District 15 (2003–2019)
- David F. Schrader, Iowa State Representative from District 69 (1987–1993) and District 90 (1993–2003), House minority leader
- Bakari Sellers, South Carolina State Representative from District 90 (2006–2014) and political commentator for CNN
- Ben Sherrer, Minority Floor Leader of the Oklahoma House of Representatives (2013–2017) and Minority Whip (2009–2013), Oklahoma State Representative from District 8 (2005–2017)
- Bill Skaggs, Missouri State Representative from District 31 (1982–2002)
- Meagan Simonaire, Maryland State Delegate from District 31B (2015–2019) (former Republican, Democrat since 2018)
- James E. Smith Jr., South Carolina State Representative from District 72 (1996–2019), 2018 nominee for Governor of South Carolina
- Sally Smith, Alaska State Representative from District 20 (1977–1983), Mayor of Juneau, Alaska (2000–2003)
- John Soper, Colorado State Representative from District 34 (2004–2013)
- Chris Spirou, New Hampshire State Representative for Hillsborough District 27 (1972–1982) and Hillsborough District 31 (1970–1972, 1982–1984), Minority Leader of the New Hampshire House of Representatives (1975–1984), Chair of the New Hampshire Democratic Party (1991–1994)
- John Sund, Alaska State Representative (1983–1988)
- Darren Swain, Maryland State Delegate from District 24 (1999–2003) and (2013–2015)
- Mike Turner, Tennessee State Representative from District 51 (2000–2014)
- Cheryl Turpin, Virginia State Delegate from District 85 (2018–2020)
- Chris Vance, 2016 nominee for Senate, Washington State Representative from District 31 (1991–1994), Chair of the Washington Republican Party (2001–2006) (former Republican, Independent since 2017)
- Roberta Voss, Arizona State Representative from District 19 (1997–2003) (Republican)
- Katherine Waddell, Virginia State Delegate from District 68 (2006–2008) (Independent)
- Nate Willems, Iowa State Representative from District 29 (2009–2013)
- Cole Wist, Colorado State Representative (2016–2019) (Republican)
