= Colin Nash =

American attorney and politician

Member of the Boise City Council
- Incumbent
- Assumed office April 2023
- Preceded by: Elaine Clegg

Member of the Idaho House of Representatives from the 16B district
- In office December 1, 2020 – February 16, 2024
- Preceded by: Rob Mason
- Succeeded by: Todd Achilles

Personal details
- Party: Democratic
- Education: Weber State University (BA); Concordia University (JD)

Colin Nash is an American attorney and politician serving as a member of Boise City Council. He is a former member of the Idaho House of Representatives from District 16, seat B representing Boise and Garden City. Nash was appointed to the Boise City Council in 2023 and elected to the Idaho House in 2020.

Nash resigned from the Idaho House in February 2024 to focus on his city council position.

== Education ==
Nash earned a bachelor's degree from Weber State University and a Juris Doctor from the Concordia University School of Law.

== Career ==
He has worked as an estate planning attorney and worked as a legal intern to State Senator Grant Burgoyne and Representative John McCrostie.

== Elections ==
=== 2018 ===
Nash ran for the open Idaho House of Representatives District Seat B taking second to Rob Mason with 31.9% of the vote, Geoff Stephenson, George Tway, and Barb Vanderpool also ran in the Democratic primary.

=== 2020 ===
Nash defeated Geoff Stephenson in the Democratic primary with 82.28% of the vote. Nash defeated Republican nominee Jacquelyn (Jackie) Davidson with 58.4% of the vote in the general election.

=== 2022 ===
Nash was unopposed in the Democratic primary. Nash defeated Republican nominee Jacquelyn (Jackie) Davidson with 60.3% of the vote in general election.

=== 2023 ===
Nash defeated Hillary Smith, Grant Burgoyne, and Jesse Gonzalez with 45.6% of the vote to claim the Boise Council District 2 seat.

=== 2025 ===
Nash defeated Derek James Smith (17.1%) and Joshua Ellstrom (13.7%) in his first Boise City Council re-election campaign with 69.2% of the vote, winning a four-year term.
