= Senator Owen =

Senator Owen may refer to:

- Bill Owen (Tennessee politician) (born 1947), Tennessee State Senate
- Bob Owen (fl. 2020s), Louisiana State Senate
- Brad Owen (born 1950), Washington State Senate
- Frank Owen III (1926–1999), Texas State Senate
- John J. Owen (1859–1933), Virginia State Senate
- John Owen (North Carolina politician) (1787–1841), North Carolina State Senate
- Robert L. Owen Sr. (1825–1873), Virginia State Senate
- Robert Latham Owen (1856–1947), U.S. Senator from Oklahoma from 1907 to 1925
- Walter C. Owen (1868–1934), Wisconsin State Senate
- William E. Owen (1888–1976), Wisconsin State Senate
- William S. Owen (1869–1941), Maine State Senate

== See also ==
- Senator Owens (disambiguation)
