= J. Philip Howard =

Massachusetts politician (1907–1992)

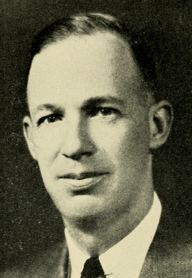

Member of the Massachusetts House of Representatives from the 2nd Worcester district
- In office 1941–1962

Personal details
- Born: February 16, 1907 Hubbardston, Massachusetts, US
- Died: May 1, 1992 (aged 85) Westminster, Massachusetts, US
- Education: Clark University; Harvard Law School

J. Philip Howard (February 16, 1907– May 1, 1992) was an American politician who was the member of the Massachusetts House of Representatives from the 2nd Worcester district.
