= Annette Turnbaugh =

American politician

Member of the Missouri House of Representatives from the 37th district
- In office January 9, 2021 – January 4, 2023
- Preceded by: Joe Runions
- Succeeded by: Anthony Ealy

Personal details
- Born: Kansas City, Missouri, U.S.
- Party: Democratic

Annette Turnbaugh represented the 37th district in the Missouri House of Representatives from 2021 to 2023. A Democrat, she succeeded fellow Democrat Joe Runions.

She attended Grandview High School and Longview Community College.

== Missouri House of Representatives ==
=== Committee assignments ===
- Conservation and Natural Resources
- Rural Community Development
- Special Committee on Small Business

=== Electoral history ===
2020 Missouri House of Representatives District 37 Democratic Primary
Party	Candidate	Votes	%	±%
Democratic	Annette Turnbaugh	3,809	100%	

2020 Missouri House of Representatives District 37 General Election
Party	Candidate	Votes	%	±%
Democratic	Annette Turnbaugh	11,271	56.1%	
Republican	John Boyd Jr.	8,517	42.4%	
