= Jonathan Zlotnik =

American politician (born 1990)

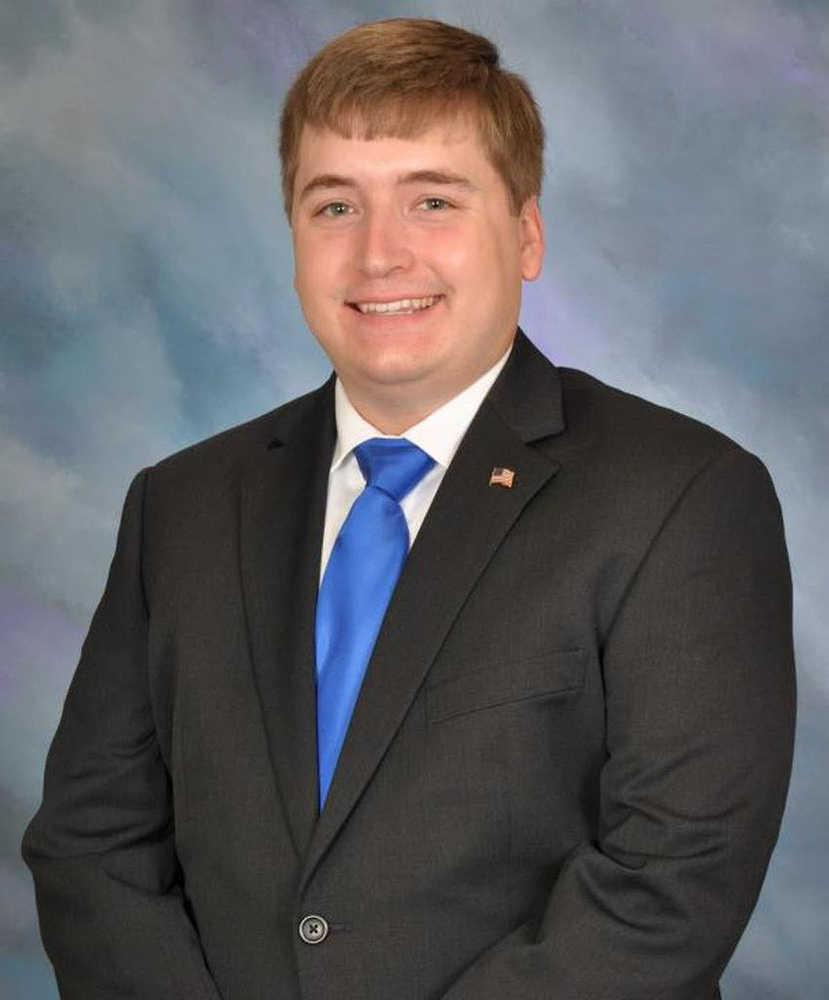

State Representative

Member of the Massachusetts House of Representatives from the 2nd Worcester district
- Incumbent
- Assumed office January 2, 2013
- Preceded by: Richard M. Bastien

Personal details
- Born: May 7, 1990 (age 36) United States
- Party: Democratic
- Education: University of Massachusetts Lowell (BA)

Jonathan "Jon" D. Zlotnik (born May 7, 1990) is an American politician who has served as a member of the Massachusetts House of Representatives since 2013.

== Early life and education ==
Born to Michael and Mary Ann, Zlotnik graduated from Gardner High School in 2008 and then from the University of Massachusetts Lowell with a Bachelor of Arts in history in 2012. His thesis was titled Actors at the End of a Bad Play: The Struggle for Polish Independence, 1796–1945.

== Political career ==
Zlotnik gained initial political experience as a summer aide in 2007 and 2008 for Robert Rice.

In 2012, Zlotnik launched a campaign for the 2nd Worcester seat in the Massachusetts House of Representatives, while he was still a senior in college. Zlotnik ultimately defeated Republican nominee, Richard M. Bastien, in the election, and deferred plans to study at Suffolk University Law School and join the United States Navy. He now serves on the Joint Committee on Education.

In 2020, Zlotnik endorsed Joe Biden and his presidential campaign, as well as Ed Markey for the 2020 Senate election in Massachusetts. In 2022, Zlotnik endorsed Lori Trahan for a seat in the House of Representatives elections in Massachusetts.

In 2023, Zlotnik ran for the Worcester and Hampshire district seat in the Massachusetts Senate when incumbent Democrat Anne Gobi resigned in June to take over as the state's Director of Rural Affairs. He was defeated by Republican Peter Durant.

In 2026, Zlotnik announced he would not seek re-election.

== Massachusetts House of Representatives ==
=== Committee Assignments ===
- Joint Committee on Community Development and Small Businesses, Vice Chair
- Joint Committee on Agriculture and Fisheries
- Joint Committee on Economic Development and Emerging Technologies
- Joint Committee on Environment and Natural Resources
