= Anthony Ealy =

American politician

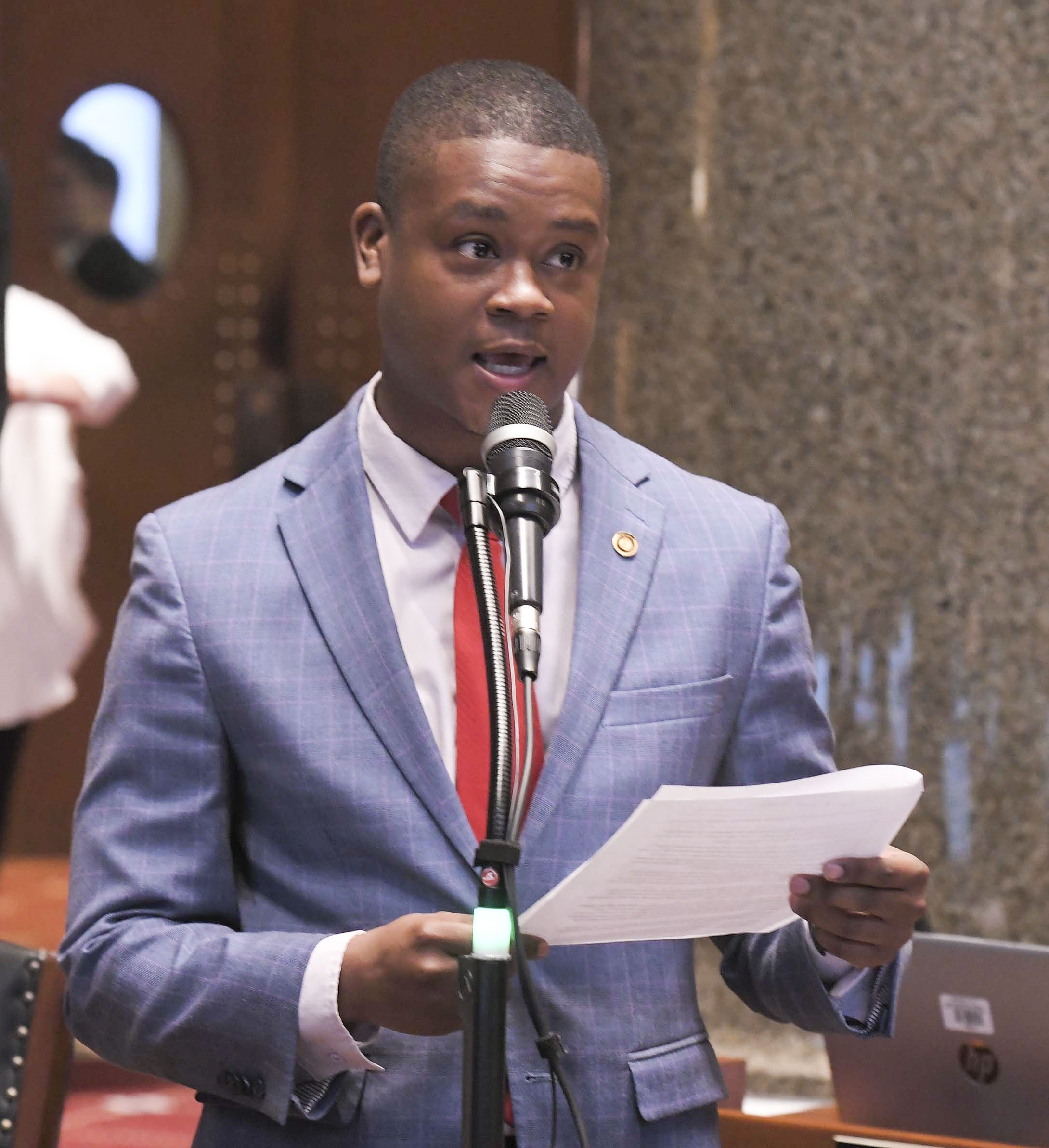
- Ealy speaking in the Missouri House of Representatives, 2024

Member of the Missouri House of Representatives from the 36 district
- Incumbent
- Assumed office January 4, 2023
- Preceded by: Annette Turnbaugh

Personal details
- Born: Philadelphia, Pennsylvania, U.S.
- Education: Northwest Missouri State University (BS); University of Missouri–Columbia School of Law (JD)

Anthony Ealy Jr. is a Democratic Party representative for a portion of Jackson County (District 36) in the Missouri House of Representatives. November 2022 marked his election for his inaugural two-year tenure in office. Ealy is the youngest representative to represent the entire district, and the first African American representative to represent the city of Grandview. Ealy is a licensed attorney and managing partner of Ealy Law, Notary & Consulting, LLC. He worked at one of the top labor law firms in the country.

== Biography ==
Ealy, was born in Philadelphia, and spent his childhood and current residence in Grandview. Ealy earned a Bachelor of Science in Political Science from Northwest Missouri State University. Ealy graduated from the University of Missouri–Columbia School of Law with a Juris Doctor degree. He has held the positions of Judicial Intern at the 16th Circuit Court of Jackson County, Emerging Leaders Fellow at the Congressional Black Caucus Foundation, and Legislative Fellow at the Office of Congressman Emanuel Cleaver.

Ealy has served on the boards of several civic organizations, including the Kansas City Metropolitan Bar Young Lawyers Board of Directors, the Genesis School Board, 100 Black Men of Greater Kansas City, South Kansas City Alliance, and the Grandview Youth Court Board of Directors.

He is a deacon-in-training at Second Missionary Baptist Church, where he resides. Harry Carson, a former linebacker for the New York Giants, is related to Ealy. Carson captained the team that won Super Bowl XXI in 1987 and is an inductee of the Pro Football Hall of Fame.

Ealy was arrested and charged with fourth-degree assault and disturbing the peace, less than a day after being reelected by a landslide 68% victory in the 2026 mid-term election.
