= Les Bock =

American politician from Idaho

Member of the Idaho Senate from District 16
- In office December 1, 2008 – December 1, 2014
- Preceded by: David Langhorst
- Succeeded by: Grant Burgoyne

Member of the Idaho House of Representatives from District 16 Seat B
- In office December 1, 2006 – December 1, 2008
- Preceded by: Jana Kemp
- Succeeded by: Elfreda Higgins

Personal details
- Born: March 5, 1949 (age 77) Rolette, North Dakota
- Party: Democratic
- Education: University of California, Davis; University of California, Hastings College of the Law
- Website: lesbock.org

Leslie Michael "Les" Bock (born March 5, 1949) is a former Democratic Idaho State Senator from the Garden City-based 16th District. He was a member of the Idaho House of Representatives from 2006 until 2008.

== Education ==
Bock earned his bachelor's degree from University of California, Davis and then his Juris Doctor degree from University of California, Hastings College of the Law. He was born in Rolette, North Dakota.

== Elections ==
In February 2014, Bock announced he would run for a judicial seat in southwestern Idaho. Bock was defeated by Incumbent Judge Richard D. Greenwood of District 4, taking only 44.2% of the vote

=== Idaho Senate District 16 ===
==== 2012 ====
Bock was unopposed for the Democratic primary. Bock defeated Republican nominee Joan Cloonan (who replaced Dennis C. Warren on the general ballot after his withdrawal following him winning the Republican primary, unopposed) with 57.3% of the vote in the general election.

==== 2010 ====
Bock was unopposed for the Democratic primary. Brock defeated Republican nominee Bill Eisenbarth with 53.7% of the vote in the general election.

==== 2008 ====
Bock was unopposed for the Democratic primary. Brock defeated Republican nominee Christ Troupis with 57.6% of the vote in the general election.

=== Idaho House of Representatives District 16 Seat B ===
==== 2006 ====
Brock was unopposed for the Democratic primary. Brock defeated incumbent Republican Jana Kemp with 52.8% of the vote in the general election.
