= Todd Achilles =

American politician (born 1967)

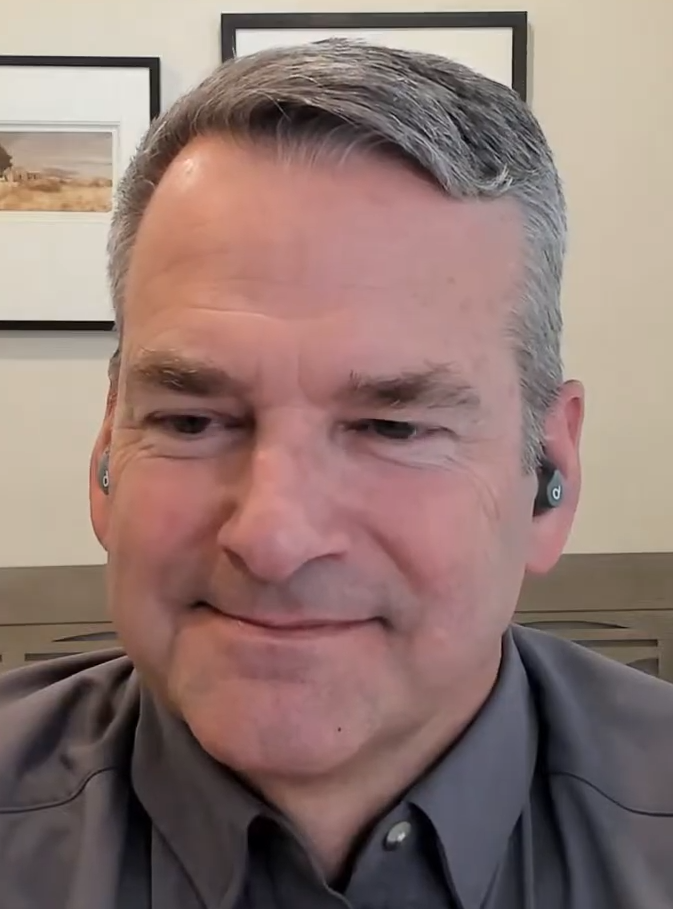
- Achilles in 2026

Member of the Idaho House of Representatives from the 16B district
- In office February 17, 2024 – July 1, 2025
- Preceded by: Colin Nash
- Succeeded by: Annie Henderson Haws

Personal details
- Born: 1967 (age 58–59) Oregon, U.S.
- Party: Republican (before 2024); Democratic (2024–2025); Independent (2025–present)
- Spouse: Robyn Achilles
- Children: 2
- Education: Claremont McKenna College (BA); University of Washington (MA, MBA); University of California, Berkeley (MPP)
- Website: Campaign website

Military service
- Branch/service: United States Army
- Years of service: 1992–1995

Theodore B. "Todd" Achilles (born 1967) is an American politician and U.S. Army veteran. He served as a member for the 16B district of the Idaho House of Representatives from 2024 to 2025. He is the co-founder of Veterans for Idaho Voters. He is a professor of public policy at Boise State University.

In the United States Army, Achilles served as a tank commander. He was appointed by Governor Brad Little to replace resigning representative Colin Nash in February 2024. He was then elected to that seat in November 2024. He resigned on July 1, 2025, to run for U.S. Senate in 2026 as an independent.

== Early life and education ==
Achilles was born in Oregon and raised on his family's farm. He earned a Bachelor of Arts degree in economics from Claremont McKenna College, master's degrees from the University of Washington, and a Master of Public Policy from the University of California, Berkeley.

== Career ==
=== Military service ===
Achilles served as an officer in the United States Army from 1992 to 1995, including service as a tank commander and armor officer. He deployed twice to the Persian Gulf.

=== Business career ===
After completing his military service, Achilles spent more than two decades working in the technology and telecommunications industries. He held executive leadership positions at T-Mobile US, HTC, and Hewlett-Packard. From 2017 to 2022, Achilles worked as the CEO of Evoca, a company that provided over-the-air subscription television service in the Boise, Phoenix, and Colorado Springs areas.

=== Idaho House of Representatives ===
Achilles was registered as a Republican before February 2024. He changed his registration to Democratic so that he would qualify to be appointed to replace Colin Nash, a Democrat, for the 16B district of the Idaho House of Representatives. Idaho Governor Brad Little, a Republican, appointed Achilles to the seat.

After his appointment, Achilles was elected to his seat in November 2024. His registration changed to unaffiliated (or independent) in June 2025. He said, "the two-party system is just fundamentally broken right now". Achilles also identified the issues of national debt and foreign policy as some reasons he became unaffiliated. Achilles resigned from the Idaho House of Representatives in July 2025 to run for U.S. Senate.

== Political positions ==
Achilles is a critic of the two-party system in the United States. He says the U.S. military is a model for "nonpartisan leadership". He says "Idaho is very independent". Achilles says Idahoans "don't like the partisan divide. We're a center-right state."

Achilles said political parties undermined U.S. Congress. He said, "President Washington, you know, he warned us about the dangers of political parties." In 2026, he said, "If we get two more independents in the Senate, we can deny a majority to either party. When we do that, the independents become the fulcrum in the chamber. Two more independents in the building and you can force the change that has to happen." He referenced the independent campaigns of Dan Osborn in Nebraska, Brian Bengs in South Dakota, Ty Pinkins in Mississippi, and Seth Bodnar in Montana.

Achilles commented on the relationship between Democrats, Republicans, and the second presidency of Donald Trump. He said, "I think the problem with most Dems [sic] is that it's a binary conversation with the White House. You're just against everything, and that's not helpful for the country and that's not how our system of government is designed to work." The Spokesman-Review said Achilles criticized Republicans for "turning a blind eye while President Donald Trump and his family have used government power to enrich themselves."

=== Artificial intelligence ===
Achilles supports community "pushback" on AI data centers. He said they "have a duty to operate efficiently, to operate within the bounds of what a community wants it to."

=== Consumer protection ===
Achilles says he supports more consumer protections. He says he is opposed to anticonsumer practices. He says reducing these practices could benefit small businesses, and improve the cost of living. He criticized companies that use surveillance pricing. In 2025, he supported a ban on algorithmic price fixing in rental housing. He criticized dynamic pricing and data mining, stating, "I may pay 20, 30% more than what you would pay."

Achilles criticized corporate monopoly power, and called for checks against it. He said, "We've got to break up these monopolies, bring some competition back". He said that would raise wages for workers. Achilles supports the second Trump administration's approach towards consolidation of the meat-packing industry. Achilles said, "four meat packers control 85% of the beef industry, and they've constantly been busted for playing games, and that impacts a huge part of Idaho's economy."

=== Fiscal policy ===
Achilles said he wants to reduce the national debt, and the federal deficit. He said investment bills such as the CHIPS Act must be compensated for by increased revenues. The Idaho Press said Achilles proposes "closing of loopholes exploited by corporations and the ultra-wealthy as well as greater checks on monopoly power could be used as a means of addressing these persistent shortfalls." Achilles says he opposes "corporate socialism". He criticized congressional cuts to Medicaid and the Supplemental Nutrition Assistance Program under the One Big Beautiful Bill Act.

He voted to cut Idaho's income tax in 2025. He opposed Idaho's grocery sales tax.

=== Foreign policy ===
Achilles said the United States should withdraw from "forever wars" and said those wars raise the national debt.

On the use of religious liberty as a rationale for wars, he says, "I will always support the freedom to worship, but I caution against military intervention to enforce this in other places around the world. We must continue to serve as an example to the world that people of all backgrounds can live in liberty and freedom. There is a reason President Ronald Reagan referred to our nation as the 'shining city upon a hill.' "

Achilles criticized Republicans in U.S. Congress for supporting the 2026 Iran war.

Achilles wrote for the American Economic Liberties Project on the semiconductor industry as pertains to national security, supply chain resilience, and competition law.

=== Healthcare ===
Achilles criticized the cuts to spending on Medicaid. He said, "that just really hits a rural state like ours." Achilles said Medicaid cuts impacted Idaho more than other states, "because of all of our rural hospitals", and "because we don't have a lot of big employers." Achilles said Idaho has "more people dependent on health exchange and on Medicaid than other states do. Sixty percent of our hospitals are small rural hospitals."

Achilles said in 2024 that he supports amending Idaho's abortion law to allow for maternal health exceptions. The Idaho Statesman said that is similar to exceptions in Utah abortion law. In 2026, he endorsed Proposition 1, which would create a right to abortion on demand up to viability (defined as the ability to survive outside of the uterus without extraordinary medical interventions).

Achilles said the Affordable Care Act (ACA) "is not working, it needs to be reformed." He criticized Congress for allowing the ACA enhanced premium tax credits to expire in 2025.

As an Idaho state legislator, Achilles introduced a bill against non-compete clauses. The Idaho Statesman said such non-compete clauses had contributed to a shortage of doctors in Idaho.

=== Immigration enforcement ===
While Achilles supports the second Trump administration's approach to border security at the Mexico–United States border, he is critical of the administration's approach to immigration enforcement. He wrote an opinion article in January 2026 that said, "Two things can be true at the same time: America needs secure borders with zero tolerance for illegal immigration, and immigrant workers contribute to Idaho's farms, job sites and communities. However, when U.S. citizens are detained or killed by immigration enforcement, it should set off alarms bells with all Americans because immigration enforcement is not a license to bypass the Constitution."

=== Institutional reform ===
Achilles says U.S. Congress should provide checks and balances. He says the two-party system undermined this.

Achilles supports more term limits. He pledged to serve no more than two terms in the U.S. Senate if elected. He supports a ban on stock trading by members of U.S. Congress.

=== Public lands ===
Achilles supports more protection of public lands. He criticized DOGE for 2025 mass layoffs in the United States Forest Service and the Bureau of Land Management. He said staffing shortages contributed to challenges for the 2026 fire season.

=== Veterans Affairs ===
Achilles criticized DOGE for their impact on the United States Department of Veterans Affairs (VA), which had been targeted for DOGE cuts in 2025. He said, "These cuts are a slap in the face of Idahoans who serve and sacrifice, and we demand better from our elected officials." He appeared at a protest against the cuts in March 2025.

Achilles supports the 2022 PACT Act. The law expanded healthcare for veterans exposed to toxic burn pit chemicals. He said, "If you're going to vote to send them to war, you better vote to take care of them when they get back."

== Personal life ==
Achilles is a Christian. He grew up on a family farm, in Willamette Valley's West Linn. He now lives in Treasure Valley. Achilles is married to Robyn Achilles. They have two children.
