= Elfreda Higgins =

American politician from Idaho

Member of the Idaho House of Representatives from the 16B district
- In office December 1, 2008 – December 1, 2012
- Preceded by: Les Bock
- Succeeded by: Hy Kloc

Personal details
- Party: Democratic
- Education: University of Phoenix (BS)
- Website: elfredahiggins.com

Elfreda Higgins (born c. 1946) is an American politician who served as a member of the Garden City Council and Idaho House of Representatives from the 16B district. During her tenure in the House, Higgins served as assistant minority leader.

== Education ==
Higgins earned her bachelor's degree in business management from the University of Phoenix.

== Elections ==
=== Idaho House of Representatives ===
==== 2010 ====
Higgins was unopposed in the Democratic primary. Higgins defeated Republican nominee Lee-Mark Ruff with 56.6% of the vote in the general election.

==== 2008 ====
When 16B Democratic Representative Les Bock left the seat open in his successful bid for the district's open senate seat left vacant by retiring Democratic Senator David Langhorst, Higgins won unopposed in the Democratic primary. Higgins defeated Republican nominee Elizabeth Allan Hodge with 55% of the vote in the general election.

=== Garden City Council ===
Higgins was elected to the Garden City Council in 2013 and served till 2020, having previously served on that body from 2006 to 2011.
