= David Langhorst =

American politician

Member of the Idaho Senate from District 16
- In office December 1, 2004 – December 1, 2008
- Preceded by: Cecil Ingram
- Succeeded by: Les Bock

Member of the Idaho House of Representatives from District 16 Seat B
- In office December 1, 2002 – December 1, 2004
- Preceded by: Hod Pomeroy
- Succeeded by: Jana Kemp

Personal details
- Born: Farmington, Minnesota, United States
- Party: Democratic
- Education: Auburn University
- Occupation: Businessperson, realtor, civil servant, politician

David R. Langhorst is an American businessman, civil servant, and politician. He was the director of the Idaho Department of Parks and Recreation, and Idaho Democratic State Senator and State Representative. Langhorst is a realtor.

== Career ==
He was a graduate of Robert E. Lee High School (now Dr. Percy L. Julian High School) in Montgomery, Alabama. Langhorst attended Auburn University in Auburn, Alabama; where he graduated with a B.A. degree in history.

In 2005, Langhorst became co-owner of J&R Electronics, a two-way radio company based out of Kootenai County Idaho. Shortly after, Langhorst and other owner Jim M. Lemm began selling cell phones out of stores in numerous cities in Hayden, Coeur d'Alene, Twin Falls, and Boise Idaho.

Langhorst was the director of the Idaho Parks and Recreation from 2014 to 2020.

=== Political career ===
He previously served as one of four commissioners of the Idaho Tax Commission from 2009 to 2014, and was formerly a Democratic member of the Idaho Senate, representing the 16th District from 2004 to 2008. He was also previously a member of the Idaho House of Representatives from 2002 through 2004.

== Arrest ==
Langhorst, was charged with felony aggravated battery, since he allegedly shoved a woman to the ground, breaking her wrist, according to a criminal complaint filed by the Ada County Prosecutor’s Office in August 2022. David has many close connections in local and state government, based on his time with the Democratic Party. The charge was dismissed in September 2022.
