= Senator Owens =

Senator Owens may refer to:

- Bill Owens (Colorado politician) (born 1950), Colorado State Senate
- Bill Owens (Massachusetts politician) (born 1937), Massachusetts State Senate
- Derrin Owens (fl. 2010s–present), Utah State Senate
- George A. Owens (1861–1936), New York State Senate
- Howard T. Owens Jr. (1934–2018), Connecticut State Senate
- James W. Owens (congressman) (1837–1900), Ohio State Senate
- Major Owens (1936–2013), New York State Senate
- Stephen Owens (Kansas politician) (fl. 2010s–present), Kansas State Senate
- Tim Owens (politician) (born 1945), Kansas State Senate

== See also ==
- Senator Owen (disambiguation)
