= Molly Lazechko =

American politician from Idaho (1926–2010)

Member of the Idaho House of Representatives for Idaho Legislative District 16
- In office 1991–1992

Personal details
- Born: Dorothy Mary Manuel; June 3, 1926 Innisfail, Alberta
- Died: September 1, 2010 (aged 84) Boise, Idaho
- Party: Idaho Democratic Party
- Occupation: Educator

Dorothy Mary "Molly" Lazechko (June 3, 1926 – September 1, 2010) was a Canadian-born American politician and educator from Idaho. She represented District 16 in the Idaho House of Representatives for one term, in 1991 and 1992; she was a Democrat.

== Early life and education ==
Lazechko was born in Innisfail, Alberta, eldest of the three daughters of Archibald Donald Manuel and Violet Georgina Adams Manuel. Her father, who operated a dairy farm and a hatchery, was born in Newfoundland, and her mother was born in England. She earned a bachelor's degree in education at Boise State University in 1976.

== Career ==
Lazechko was an elementary and junior high school teacher in Alberta and Idaho for thirty years. She wore a costume to represent Canada at a World Thinking Day event for Boise Girl Scouts in 1963. She retired from teaching in 1986, and was president of Retired Educators of Idaho. In 1991, a scholarship in her name was established at Boise State University.

Lazechko was elected to a seat in the Idaho House of Representatives in 1990, and served in 1991 and 1992. She worked for education and environmental causes during her term as a legislator. She lost an especially close race for re-election in 1992; the election's result was confirmed in a recount, and she was succeeded by Sylvia McKeeth. In 1993, Lazechko represented the Veteran Park Neighborhood Association in public discussions about street safety and accessibility in northern Boise. She was chair of the Ada County Democratic Party in 1998.

== Death ==
Dorothy Manuel married Walter Vladimir Lazechko in 1960, and they had two sons. She died in 2010 in Boise, at the age of 84.
