= Rob Mason =

American politician

Member of the Idaho House of Representatives from the 16B district
- In office December 1, 2018 – November 30, 2020
- Preceded by: Hy Kloc
- Succeeded by: Colin Nash

Personal details
- Born: June 8, 1976 (age 50) Elizabethtown, Pennsylvania, United States
- Party: Democratic (2018-present)
- Education: Georgia Tech; Bachelor's degree in environmental biology

Rob Mason (born June 8, 1976) is an American politician serving as a member of the Idaho House of Representatives from the 16th district from 2018 to 2020. Mason is a member of the Democratic Party and is an environmentalist.

== Early life and education ==
Rob Mason was born on June 8, 1976, in Elizabethtown, Pennsylvania. He went to college at Georgia Tech, where he became an environmentalist and graduated with a bachelor's degree in environmental biology.

== Early career ==
Mason was a member of the U.S. Forest Service for seven years from 2001 to 2008. After leaving the U.S Forest Service, Mason was the head of Selway-Bitterroot Frank Church Foundation for five years, from 2008 to 2013. Mason is currently the Central Idaho Representative for the Wilderness Society, a job he has held since 2013.

== Idaho House of Representatives ==
=== Committees ===
During his term, Mason has served on the following Committees.

- Environment, Energy, and Technology Committee
- Resources and Conservation Committee
- Revenue and Taxation Committee

== Elections ==
=== 2018 ===
Mason defeated Colin Nash, Barb Vanderpool, George Tway, and Geoff Stephenson in the Democratic primary with 35.4% of the vote. Mason defeated Republican nominee Jim Silsby with 62.6% of the vote.
