= Hy Kloc =

American politician from Idaho (1947–2022)

Member of the Idaho House of Representatives from District 16 Seat B
- In office December 1, 2012 – December 1, 2018
- Preceded by: Elfreda Higgins
- Succeeded by: Rob Mason

Personal details
- Born: February 10, 1947 Essen, North Rhine-Westphalia, Germany
- Died: December 6, 2022 (aged 75) Boise, Idaho, U.S.
- Party: Democratic
- Spouse: Joan Wallace
- Education: New York City Community College; Western Michigan University
- Website: hykloc.org

Hy Kloc (February 10, 1947 – December 6, 2022) was an American Democratic politician who was a member of the Idaho House of Representatives, representing the northwest Ada County-based District 16 from 2012 to 2018.

== Biography ==
Kloc was born in 1947. The son of Polish Holocaust survivors, he emigrated to the United States at age three and settled in Brooklyn. He earned his AAS in marketing management from New York City Community College (now New York City College of Technology) and his BS in business education from Western Michigan University.

Upon moving to Boise in 2001, Kloc served as development director of Boise State Radio.

He died from a heart attack on December 6, 2022, at the age of 75. He had suffered from cancer prior to his death.

== Elections ==
=== Greater Boise Auditorium District ===
Kloc was elected to the Greater Boise Auditorium District board of directors in 2011 and re elected in 2017.

He served as its chairman from 2011 to 2014 and vice chairman in 2014.

=== Idaho House of Representatives ===
2016

Kloc was unopposed in the primary and the general election.

2014

Kloc was unchallenged in the primary.

He won the general election against Republican nominee Jim Silsby with 8,257 votes (58.31%).

2012

When Democratic Representative Elfreda Higgins retired and left the District 16 B seat open, Kloc won the May 15, 2012, Democratic primary with 881 votes (73.3%) against David A. Honey.

He won the November 6, 2012, general election with 10,258 votes (54.2%) against Republican nominee Graham Paterson.
