= Massachusetts House of Representatives' 2nd Worcester district =

American legislative district

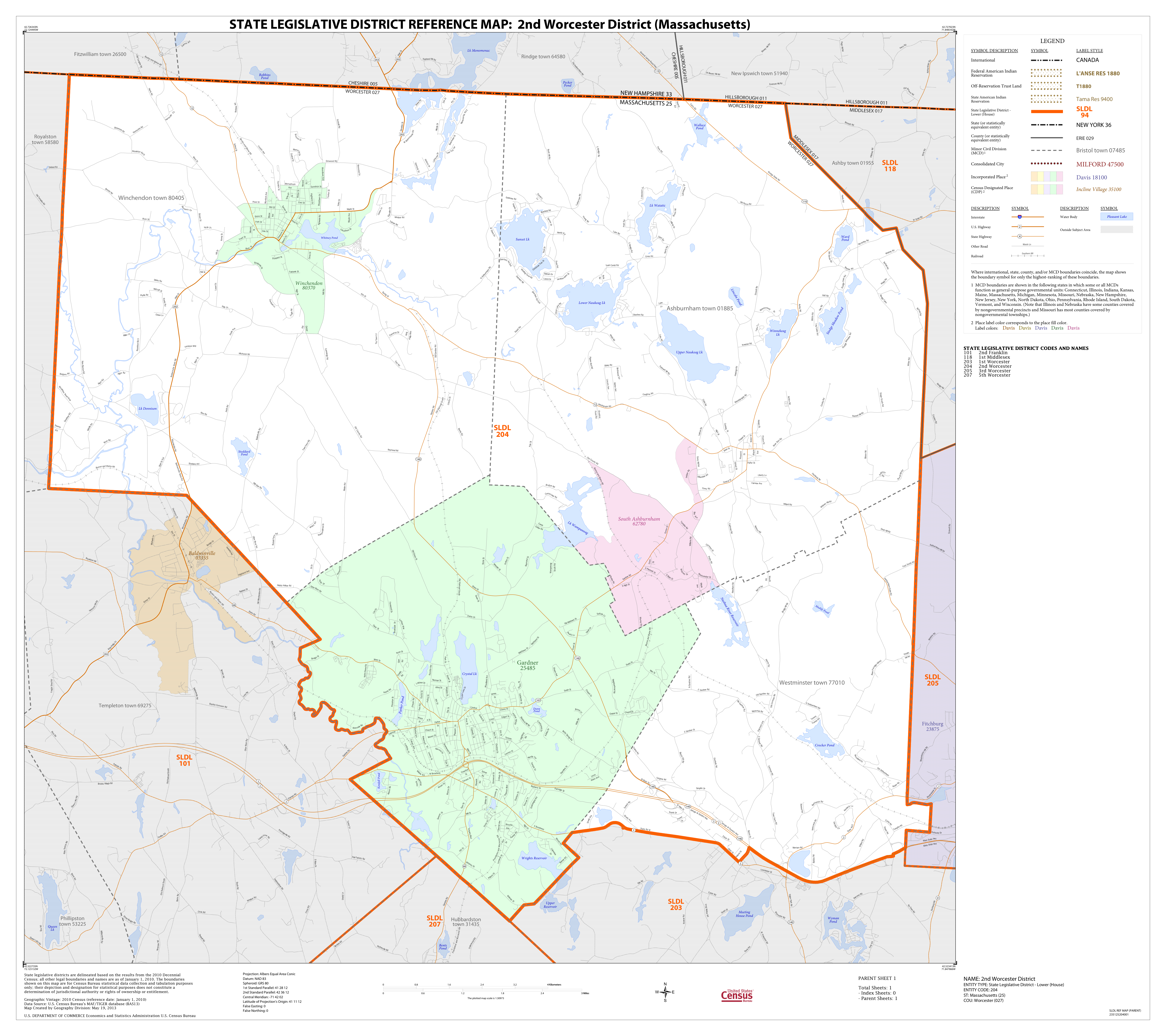
Map of Massachusetts House of Representatives' 2nd Worcester district, based on the 2010 United States census.

Massachusetts House of Representatives' 2nd Worcester district in the United States is one of 160 legislative districts included in the lower house of the Massachusetts General Court. It covers part of Worcester County. Democrat Jon Zlotnik of Gardner has represented the district since 2013.

== Towns represented ==
The district includes the following localities:

- Ashburnham
- Gardner
- part of Westminster
- Winchendon

The current district geographic boundary overlaps with those of the Massachusetts Senate's Worcester and Middlesex district and Worcester, Hampden, Hampshire and Middlesex district.

== Representatives ==
- Isaac Stevens, circa 1858
- George Whitney, circa 1859
- Charles W. Conant, circa 1888
- Nathaniel R. Perkins, circa 1888
- Charles H. Hartshorn, circa 1920
- J. Warren Moulton, circa 1920
- J. Philip Howard, circa 1951
- Robert D. Wetmore, 1971-1977
- Richard M. Bastien
- Jonathan Zlotnik, 2013–present

== See also ==
- List of Massachusetts House of Representatives elections
- Other Worcester County districts of the Massachusetts House of Representatives: 1st, 3rd, 4th, 5th, 6th, 7th, 8th, 9th, 10th, 11th, 12th, 13th, 14th, 15th, 16th, 17th, 18th
- Worcester County districts of the Massachusett Senate: 1st, 2nd; Hampshire, Franklin and Worcester; Middlesex and Worcester; Worcester, Hampden, Hampshire and Middlesex; Worcester and Middlesex; Worcester and Norfolk
- List of Massachusetts General Courts
- List of former districts of the Massachusetts House of Representatives

== Images ==
Portraits of legislators

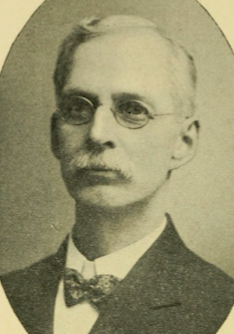
Frank Barrell

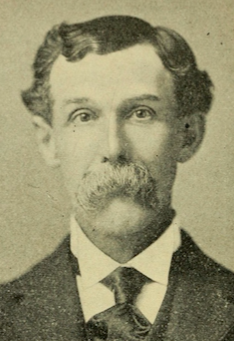
William Learned

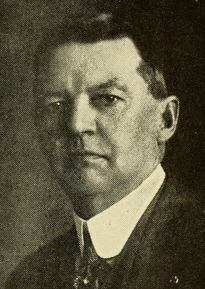
Charles Hartshorn

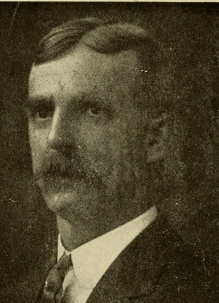
J Warren Moulton

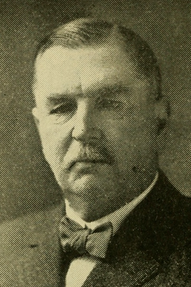
Elwin Thompson

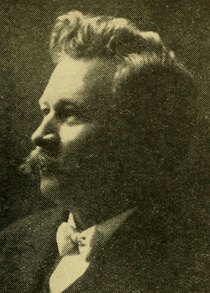
Herman Pehrsson

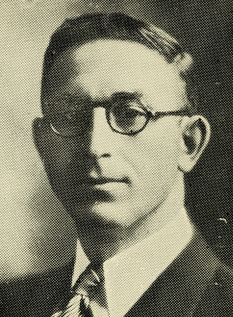
Fred Blake

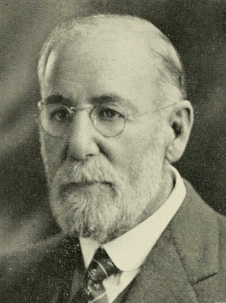
George Stone

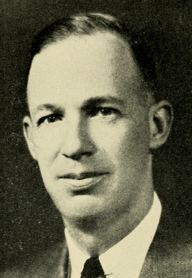
J Philip Howard

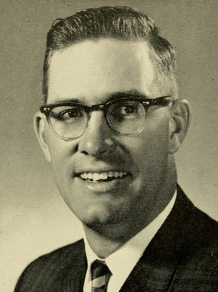
Robert D. Wetmore

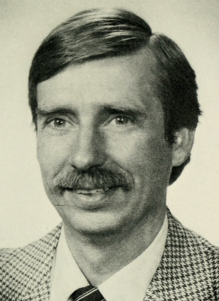
Chester Suhoski

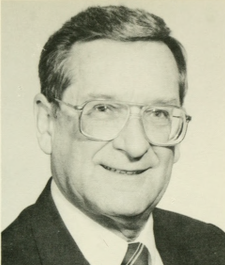
Robert Hawke

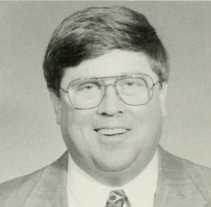
Brian Knuuttila

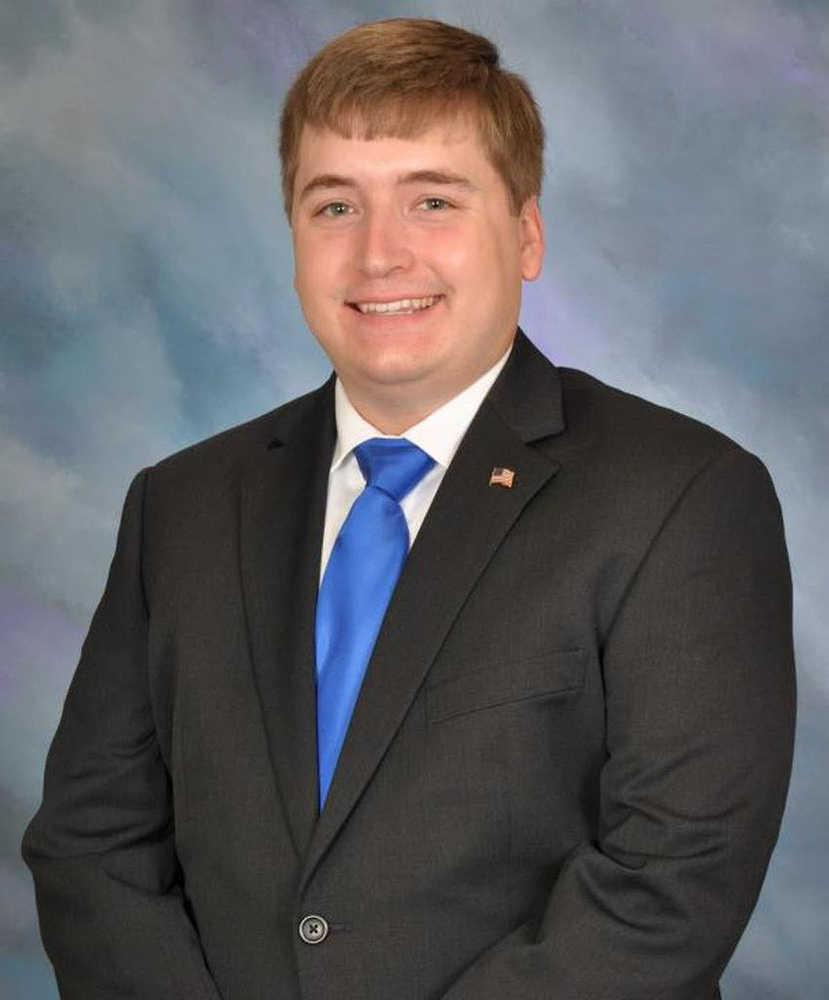
Jonathan Zlotnik
