= Idaho's 16th legislative district =

American legislative district

Idaho's 16th legislative district is one of 35 districts of the Idaho Legislature. It is currently represented by Grant Burgoyne, Democrat of Boise, John McCrostie, Democrat of Garden City, and Hy Kloc, Democrat of Boise.

== District profile ==
=== 2012–present ===
District 16 currently consists of a portion of Ada County.

Legislature	Session	Senate	House Seat A	House Seat B
62nd (2012 – 2014)	1st	Les Bock (D)	Grant Burgoyne (D)	Hy Kloc (D)
62nd (2012 – 2014)	2nd	Les Bock (D)	Grant Burgoyne (D)	Hy Kloc (D)
63rd (2014 – 2016)	1st	Grant Burgoyne (D)	John McCrostie (D)	Hy Kloc (D)
63rd (2014 – 2016)	2nd	Grant Burgoyne (D)	John McCrostie (D)	Hy Kloc (D)
64th (2016 – 2018)	1st	Grant Burgoyne (D)	John McCrostie (D)	Hy Kloc (D)
64th (2016 – 2018)	2nd	Grant Burgoyne (D)	John McCrostie (D)	Hy Kloc (D)
65th (2018 – 2020)	1st	Grant Burgoyne (D)	John McCrostie (D)	Rob Mason (D)
65th (2018 – 2020)	2nd	Grant Burgoyne (D)	John McCrostie (D)	Rob Mason (D)
66th (2020 – 2022)	1st	Grant Burgoyne (D)	John McCrostie (D)	Colin Nash (D)
66th (2020 – 2022)	2nd	Grant Burgoyne (D)	John McCrostie (D)	Colin Nash (D)

=== 2002–2012 ===
From 2002 to 2012, District 16 consisted of a portion of Ada County.

Legislature	Session	Senate	House Seat A	House Seat B
57th (2002 – 2004)	1st	Cecil Ingram (R)	Margaret Henbest (D)	David Langhorst (D)
57th (2002 – 2004)	2nd	Cecil Ingram (R)	Margaret Henbest (D)	David Langhorst (D)
58th (2004 – 2006)	1st	David Langhorst (D)	Margaret Henbest (D)	Jana Kemp (R)
58th (2004 – 2006)	2nd	David Langhorst (D)	Margaret Henbest (D)	Jana Kemp (R)
59th (2006 – 2008)	1st	David Langhorst (D)	Margaret Henbest (D)	Les Bock (D)
59th (2006 – 2008)	2nd	David Langhorst (D)	Margaret Henbest (D)	Les Bock (D)
60th (2008 – 2010)	1st	Les Bock (D)	Grant Burgoyne (D)	Elfreda Higgins (D)
60th (2008 – 2010)	2nd	Les Bock (D)	Grant Burgoyne (D)	Elfreda Higgins (D)
61st (2010 – 2012)	1st	Les Bock (D)	Grant Burgoyne (D)	Elfreda Higgins (D)
61st (2010 – 2012)	2nd	Les Bock (D)	Grant Burgoyne (D)	Elfreda Higgins (D)

=== 1992–2002 ===
From 1992 to 2002, District 16 consisted of a portion of Ada County.

Molly Lazechko (Democratic)

Legislature	Session	Senate	House Seat A	House Seat B
51st (1992 – 1994)	1st	Cecil Ingram (R)	Sylvia McKeeth (R)	Hod Pomeroy (R)
51st (1992 – 1994)	2nd	Cecil Ingram (R)	Sylvia McKeeth (R)	Hod Pomeroy (R)
52nd (1994 – 1996)	1st	Cecil Ingram (R)	Sylvia McKeeth (R)	Hod Pomeroy (R)
52nd (1994 – 1996)	2nd	Cecil Ingram (R)	Sylvia McKeeth (R)	Hod Pomeroy (R)
53rd (1996 – 1998)	1st	Cecil Ingram (R)	Margaret Henbest (D)	Hod Pomeroy (R)
53rd (1996 – 1998)	2nd	Cecil Ingram (R)	Margaret Henbest (D)	Hod Pomeroy (R)
54th (1998 – 2000)	1st	Cecil Ingram (R)	Margaret Henbest (D)	Hod Pomeroy (R)
54th (1998 – 2000)	2nd	Cecil Ingram (R)	Margaret Henbest (D)	Hod Pomeroy (R)
55th (2000 – 2002)	1st	Cecil Ingram (R)	Margaret Henbest (D)	Hod Pomeroy (R)
55th (2000 – 2002)	2nd	Cecil Ingram (R)	Margaret Henbest (D)	Hod Pomeroy (R)

== See also ==
- List of Idaho senators
- List of Idaho representatives
