= John McCrostie =

American politician from Idaho

Member of the Idaho House of Representatives from the 16A district
- In office December 1, 2014 – November 30, 2022
- Preceded by: Grant Burgoyne
- Succeeded by: Soñia Galaviz

Personal details
- Born: c. 1970 (age 55–56) Mountain Home, Idaho, U.S.
- Party: Democratic
- Spouse: Dave Navarro
- Website: www.mccrostie4idaho.com

John McCrostie is an American teacher and former Democratic politician who served as a member of the Idaho House of Representatives for four terms representing the 16A district. McCrostie was also the assistant minority leader of the House. He ran for a Garden City, Idaho city council seat in November 2021 but was unsuccessful.

== Early life and education ==
McCrostie grew up in Mountain Home, Idaho, and graduated from Mountain Home High School in 1988. He graduated magna cum laude with a Bachelor of Arts in music education from Oral Roberts University.

== Career ==
McCrostie taught music in Mountain Home and Boise, later starting work for Hewlett-Packard (HP) and providing title insurance. He also rose in the ranks of organized labor for the National Education Association and advocated for LGBT workers in the education sector and at HP.

== Elections ==
=== 2014 ===
In 2013, McCrostie announced his run in the Democratic primary for State House District 16A to succeed Grant Burgoyne, who ran for the district's open senate seat.

McCrostie won the May 2014 Democratic primary against former NFL player Jimmy Farris and Jeff Stephenson with 52.6% of the vote. McCrostie defeated Republican nominee Rosann Wiltse with 58.4% of the vote in the general election.

=== 2016 ===
McCrostie defeated Geoff Stephenson in the Democratic primary with 83.7% of the vote. McCrostie defeated Republican nominee Joel H. Robinson with 53.8% of the vote in the general election.

In October 2016, McCrostie faced criticism when he was recorded on a cell phone gathering up a challenger's campaign fliers while campaigning door-to-door in Boise. The campaign flyers came from Ryan McDonald, a Republican challenger to District 16 Sen. Grant Burgoyne. When confronted, McCrostie stated, "It's part of the game." Later, he issued a statement apologizing to family, friends, and supporters, saying he had "made a mistake" in taking the challenger's materials. McCrostie’s charge of misdemeanor petty theft was dismissed by Judge Thomas Watkins after he completed 30 hours of community service.

=== 2018 ===
McCrostie ran unopposed in the Democratic primary. McCrostie defeated Republican nominee and local Irrigation District Director Graham Paterson with 61.9% of the vote.

=== 2020 ===
McCrostie ran unopposed in the Democratic primary. McCrostie defeated Independent candidate (but affiliated with the Republican Party) Chandler S Hadraba with 98.1% of the vote.

=== 2021 ===
McCrostie ran for one of two seats on Garden City, Idaho city council. He ran as group with Hannah Ball for mayor and Greta Mohr for the other seat on city council. McCrostie was unsuccessful.

== Personal life ==
McCrostie is the second openly-LGBT member in the history of the Idaho, after Nicole LeFavour, to have served in the Idaho Legislature.
