= Joe Runions =

American politician

Member of the Missouri House of Representatives from the 37th district
- Incumbent
- Assumed office 2013
- Succeeded by: Annette Turnbaugh

Personal details
- Born: November 6, 1940 (age 85) Kansas City, Missouri
- Party: Democratic
- Spouse: Janice
- Children: two
- Profession: electrician

Joe Runions (born November 6, 1940) is an American politician. He is a member of the Missouri House of Representatives, having served since 2013. He is a member of the Democratic Party.

Runions was diagnosed with Coronavirus disease 2019 on March 20, 2020.
