= Grant Burgoyne =

American politician from Idaho

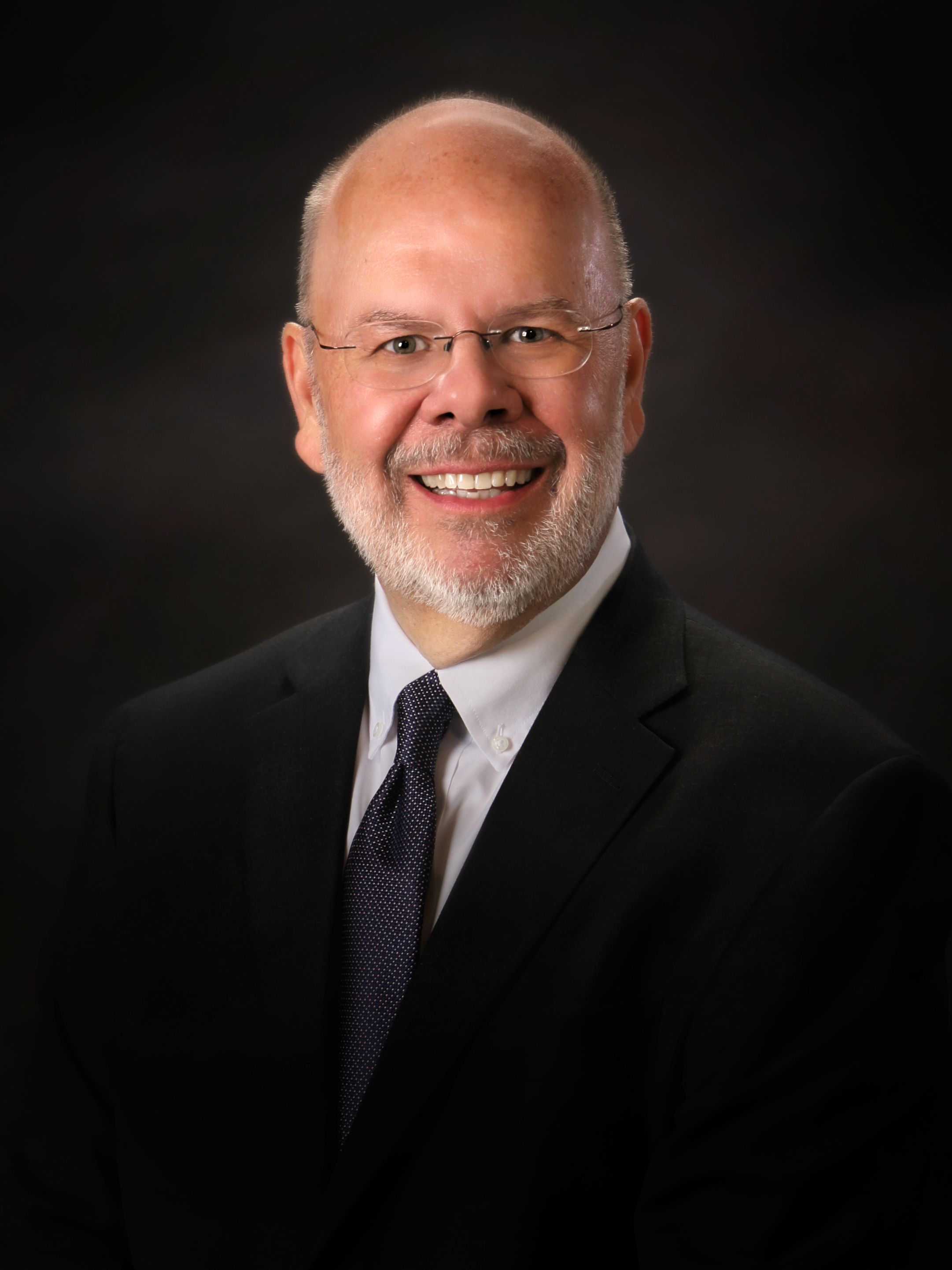

Member of the Idaho Senate from District 16
- In office December 1, 2014 – November 30, 2022
- Preceded by: Les Bock
- Succeeded by: Alison Rabe

Member of the Idaho House of Representatives from District 16 Seat A
- In office December 1, 2008 – December 1, 2014
- Preceded by: Margaret Henbest
- Succeeded by: John McCrostie

Personal details
- Born: August 9, 1953 (age 73) Ketchikan, Territory of Alaska
- Party: Democratic
- Spouse: Christy Burgoyne
- Education: University of Idaho; University of Kansas School of Law
- Profession: Lawyer
- Website: burgoyneforsenate.com

Grant T. Burgoyne (born August 9, 1953) is an American attorney, politician, and a former Democratic member of the Idaho Senate representing Idaho's District 16. Burgoyne was born on August 9, 1953, in Ketchikan, Alaska.

== Elections ==
District 16 House Seat A - Part of Ada County
Year	Candidate	Votes	Pct	Candidate	Votes	Pct
2008 Primary	Grant Burgoyne	1,410	100%			
2008 General	Grant Burgoyne	9,096	55.7%	Joan Cloonan	7,225	44.3%
2010 Primary	Grant Burgoyne (incumbent)	771	100%			
2010 General	Grant Burgoyne (incumbent)	5,934	52.7%	Ralph Perez	5,319	47.3%

District 16 Senate - Part of Ada County
Year	Candidate	Votes	Pct	Candidate	Votes	Pct	Candidate	Votes	Pct
2012 Primary	Grant Burgoyne	1,152	100%						
2012 General	Grant Burgoyne	10,158	54.0%	Lee-Mark Ruff	7,230	38.4%	Jeffrey Laing	1,427	7.6%
2014 Primary	Grant Burgoyne (incumbent)	1,806	100%						
2014 General	Grant Burgoyne (incumbent)	8,563	60.4%	Joel Robinson	5,623	39.6%			
2016 Primary	Grant Burgoyne (incumbent)	1,697	100.0%						
2016 General	Grant Burgoyne (incumbent)	11,360	57.0%	Ryan McDonald	8,563	43.0%	Ryan Thompson (W/I)	2	0.0%
2018 Primary	Grant Burgoyne (incumbent)	3,576	100.0%						
2018 General	Grant Burgoyne (incumbent)	12,784	65.2%	LeeJoe Lay	6,819	34.8%			
