= Bill Owen (Tennessee politician) =

American politician

Member of Tennessee Senate for District 7
- In office 1985–1991

Personal details
- Party: Democratic

William S. Owen (born November 18, 1947) is an American politician who served as a member of the Tennessee House of Representatives and Tennessee Senate, representing Knoxville districts. He is a member of the Democratic National Committee.

Owen endorsed the Joe Biden 2020 presidential campaign.
