= 2018 Idaho gubernatorial election =

- November 6, 2018
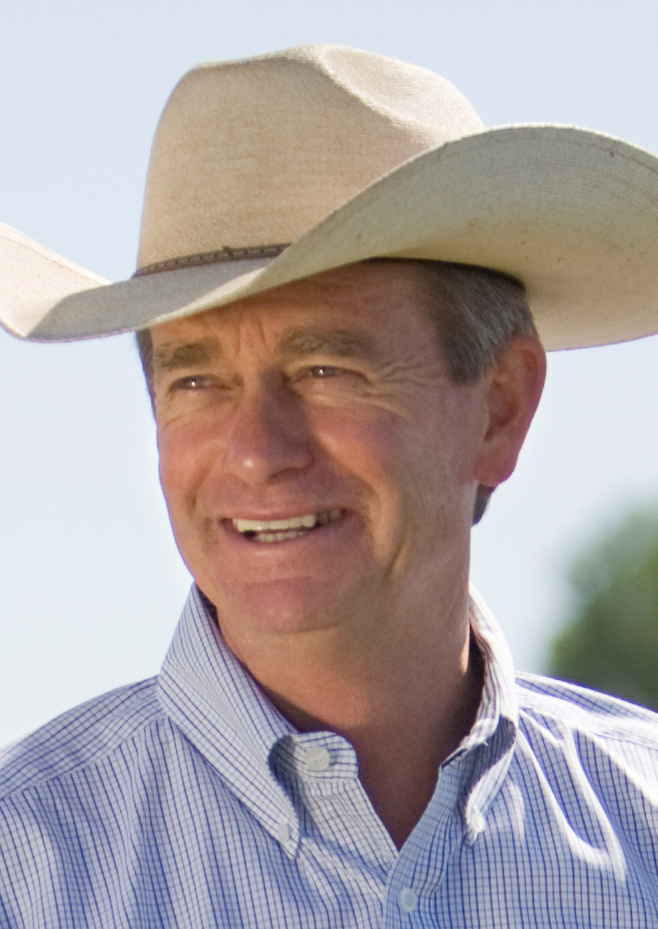

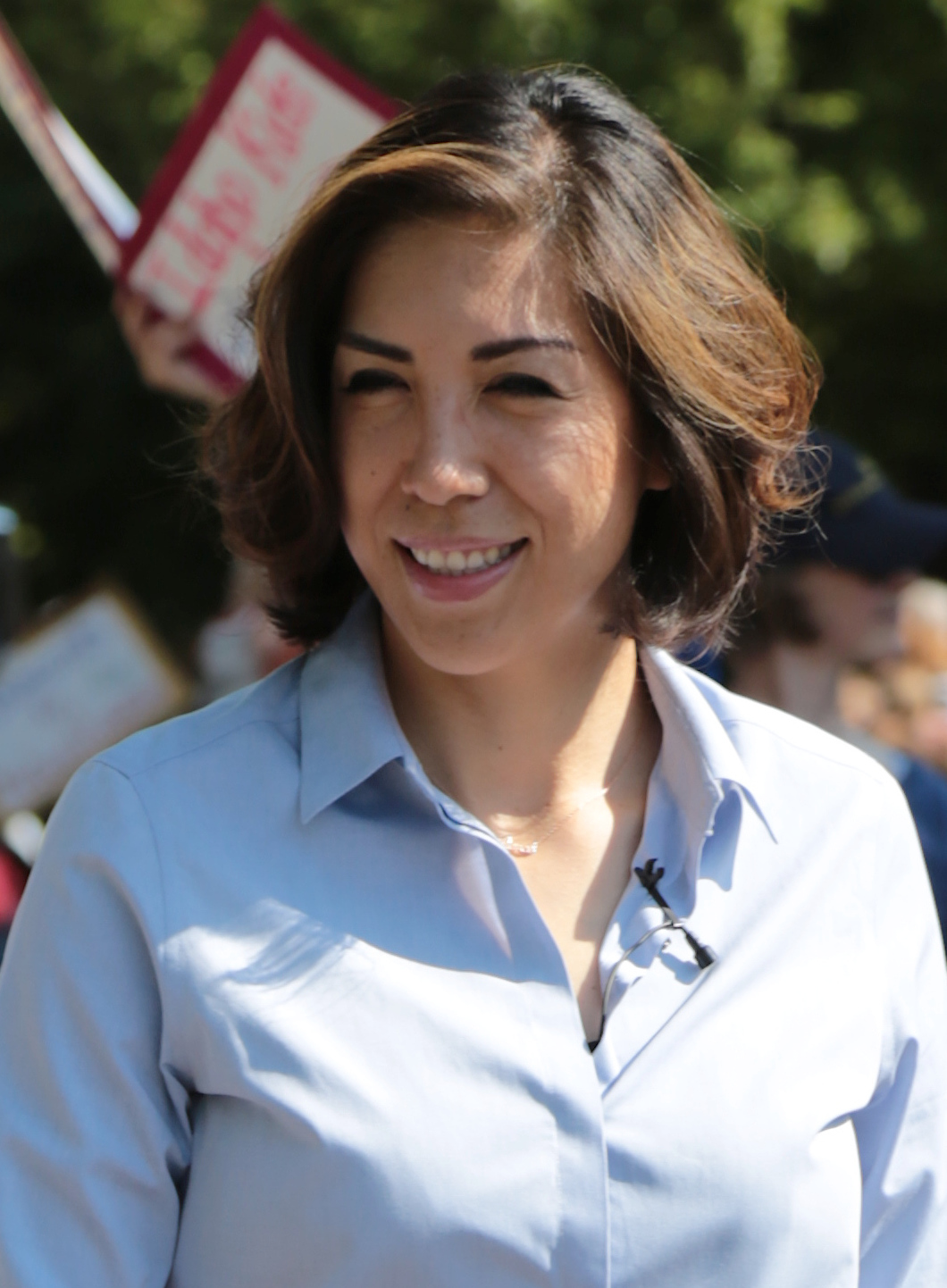
Nominee	Brad Little	Paulette Jordan
Party	Republican	Democratic
Popular vote	361,661	231,081
Percentage	59.76%	38.19%
- Little: 50–60% 60–70% 70–80% 80–90% Jordan: 40–50% 50–60% 60–70%
Governor before election
Butch Otter
Republican
Elected Governor
Brad Little
Republican

The 2018 Idaho gubernatorial election took place on November 6 to elect the next governor of Idaho. Incumbent Republican Governor Butch Otter chose not to run for a fourth term, and the state's primaries were held on May 15.

Former state representative Paulette Jordan was the Democratic Party's nominee. She was the first Democratic nominee from Northern Idaho since Cecil Andrus, who was first elected governor in 1970. Had she won, she'd also have been the first female Native American governor of Idaho.

Jordan lost to incumbent lieutenant governor Brad Little by 21.6 percentage points, for a seventh consecutive Republican victory.

A record 605,131 votes were cast for governor in 2018, a 37.6% increase over the previous election in 2014 (439,830 votes). The previous high was 452,535 votes in 2010.

== Republican primary ==
Incumbent governor Butch Otter chose not to run for reelection for a fourth term in office.

=== Candidates ===
==== Declared ====
- Tommy Ahlquist, businessman and former emergency physician
- Harley Brown, perennial candidate
- Dalton Cannady
- Raúl Labrador, incumbent U.S. representative from Idaho's 1st congressional district
- Brad Little, lieutenant governor of Idaho
- Lisa Marie, perennial candidate
- Steve Pankey, Constitution nominee for governor in 2014 and future convicted murderer

==== Withdrew ====
- Russ Fulcher, former state senator and candidate for governor in 2014 (ran for U.S. House)
- Troy Minton, activist (running as a Democrat)

==== Declined ====
- Butch Otter, incumbent governor
- Lori Otter, First Lady of Idaho
- Lawrence Wasden, Idaho Attorney General (ran for re-election)

=== Campaign ===
Lieutenant Governor Brad Little indicated in June 2016 that he would run for governor, a decision described as "early" by the Idaho Statesman. Little was characterized as a politician favored by members of the party establishment, including Otter and U.S. senator Jim Risch.

Representative Raúl Labrador chose to forgo reelection in the 1st district in favor of a gubernatorial candidacy. Labrador, a founding member of the Freedom Caucus, was considered the most conservative candidate in the primary. As a candidate, Labrador suggested that he would be open to overruling Medicaid expansion in the event the state's 2018 ballot measure on the issue passed.

Physician and Boise-area property developer Tommy Ahlquist, a first time candidate, touted his non-political background and pledged to cut regulations to encourage growth. Ahlquist notably received the support of 2012 Republican presidential nominee Mitt Romney.

=== Endorsements ===
Tommy Ahlquist

U.S. governors (current and former)

- Mitt Romney, former governor of Massachusetts and Republican nominee for president of the United States in 2012

Republican National Committee members

- Damond Watkins, Idaho Republican Party National Committeeman

Mayors

- Michael Barrett, mayor of Challis, Idaho
- Steve Bateman, mayor of Nezperce, Idaho
- Tammy de Weerd, mayor of Meridian, Idaho
- Kevin England, mayor of Chubbuck, Idaho
- Kip McGillivray, mayor of Osburn, Idaho
- Jason Richardson, mayor of Rigby, Idaho
- Darin Taylor, mayor of Middleton, Idaho
- Pete Weir, mayor of Hagerman, Idaho

Individuals

- Charlie Kirk, founder and executive director of Turning Point USA
- Candace Owens, communications director for Turning Point USA

Individuals

- Kristin Armstrong, Olympic gold medalist
Raúl Labrador

U.S. senators

- Ted Cruz, Texas
- Rand Paul, Kentucky

State legislators (current and former)

- Idaho state senators: Cliff Bayer, Lori Den Hartog, Dean Mortimer, Tony Potts, Mary Souza, Steve Vick
- Idaho state representatives: Vito Barbieri, Judy Boyle, Greg Chaney, Don Cheatham, Brent Crane, Gayann DeMordaunt, Sage Dixon, Barbara Ehardt, Terry Gestrin, Karey Hanks, Steve Harris, Mike Kingsley, Lynn Luker, Ron Mendive, Jason Monks, Dorothy Moon, Ron Nate, Joe Palmer, Heather Scott, Paul Shepherd, Thyra Stevenson, John Vander Woude, Christy Zito, Bryan Zollinger
- Former Idaho state senators: Rod Beck and Sheryl Nuxoll
- Former Idaho state representatives: Ken Andrus, Gayle Batt, Reed DeMordaunt, Steve Kren, Kathleen Sims, and JoAn Wood

Individuals

- David Bossie, deputy campaign manager for Donald Trump's 2016 presidential campaign
- Dick Heller
- Tyler Ricks, Idaho Young Republicans treasurer and Ada GOP precinct committeeman

Political action committees

- Protect Freedom PAC

Trade associations

- Inland Pacific Chapter of Associated Builders and Contractors (IPC-ABC)

Organizations

- Family Policy Alliance of Idaho
- Idaho Chooses Life
Brad Little

U.S. governors (current and former)

- Phil Batt, former governor of Idaho
- Butch Otter, governor of Idaho

U.S. senators

- Idaho: Jim Risch (also former governor of Idaho)

U.S. representatives

- Mike Simpson, Idaho

Statewide elected officials (current and former'

- Jack Riggs, former lieutenant governor of Idaho
- Brandon Woolf, Idaho state controller
- Ben Ysursa, former Idaho secretary of state

State legislators (current and former)

- Scott Bedke, Speaker of the Idaho House of Representatives
- Brent Hill, president pro tempore of the Idaho Senate
- Idaho state senators: Patti Anne Lodge and Jeff Siddoway
- Idaho state representatives: Megan Blanksma, Stephen Hartgen, Ryan Kerby, and Eric Redman
- Former Idaho state senators: Denton Darrington and Jim Hammond
- Former Idaho state representatives: George Eskridge, Lee Gagner, and Bert Stevenson

Newspapers

- Idaho Mountain Express
- The Idaho Press-Tribune
- Idaho Statesman
- Times-News

Organizations

- Idaho Associated General Contractors
- Idaho Cattle Association
- Idaho Grain Producers Association
- Idaho Loggers PAC
- Idaho Medical Association
- Idaho Realtors
- Idaho State Dental Association
- National Federation of Independent Business
- Professional Fire Fighters of Idaho

=== Polling ===
Poll source	Date(s) administered	Sample size	Margin of error	Tommy Ahlquist	Raul Labrador	Brad Little	Lisa Marie	Lawrence Wasden*	Other	Undecided
Dan Jones & Associates	February 26 – March 15, 2018	–	–	21%	25%	17%	–	–	6%	31%
Dan Jones & Associates	November 8–15, 2017	619	± 3.9%	14%	17%	21%	4%	4%	5%	36%
Magellan Strategies (R-Labrador)	October 11–12, 2017	714	± 3.7%	21%	37%	23%	–	–	–	19%

* Denotes candidates who did not enter the race.

=== Forum and debates ===
2018 Idaho gubernatorial election Republican primary candidate forum and debates
No.	Date	Host	Moderator	Link	Republican	Republican	Republican
Key: P Participant A Absent N Not invited I Invited W Withdrawn							
Key: P Participant A Absent N Not invited I Invited W Withdrawn					Tommy Ahlquist	Raúl Labrador	Brad Little
1	Apr. 10, 2018	Greater Idaho Falls Chamber of Commerce; KIDK; Compass Academy	Todd Kunz		P	N	P
2	Apr. 23, 2018	Idaho Public Television	Melissa Davlin		P	P	P
3	May 1, 2018	KTVB; Northwest Nazarene University	Dee Sarton		P	P	P

=== Results ===
Little ultimately won the primary with 37.3% of the vote, with Labrador taking 32.6% and Ahlquist taking 26.2%. Little's campaign performed best in the Boise metropolitan area and agrarian communities in the southwestern part of the state. Labrador performed best in areas in the 1st congressional district, located in the northern part of the state. Ahlquist, a Mormon, saw a better performance in eastern counties, which have a notable Latter Day Saint (LDS) presence.

Results by county: Little: 50–60%; 40–50%; 30–40%; Labrador: 40–50%; 30–40%; Ahlquist: 40–50%; 30–40%

Republican primary
Party	Candidate	Votes	%
Republican	Brad Little	72,518	37.3
Republican	Raúl Labrador	63,460	32.6
Republican	Tommy Ahlquist	50,977	26.2
Republican	Lisa Marie	3,390	1.7
Republican	Steve Pankey	2,701	1.4
Republican	Harley Brown	874	0.4
Republican	Dalton Cannady	528	0.3
Total votes		194,448	100.0

== Democratic primary ==
=== Candidates ===
==== Declared ====
- A.J. Balukoff, businessman, member of the Boise School District board of trustees and nominee for governor in 2014
- Peter Dill, organic farmer and business attorney
- Paulette Jordan, former state representative

==== Declined ====
- Michelle Stennett, minority leader of the Idaho Senate

=== Endorsements ===
A. J. Balukoff

U.S. representatives (former)

- Idaho: Larry LaRocco, Walt Minnick, and Richard Stallings

Statewide officials (current and former)

- Betty Richardson, former U.S. Attorney for Idaho
- Cathy Silak, former Idaho Supreme Court justice

State legislators (current and former)

- Mat Erpelding, Idaho House minority leader
- Idaho state senators: Cherie Buckner-Webb, Grant Burgoyne, Maryanne Jordan, Mark Nye, and Janie Ward-Engelking
- Idaho state representatives: Sue Chew, Phylis King, Hy Kloc, John McCrostie, Elaine Smith, and Melissa Wintrow
- Former Idaho state senators: Ron Beitelspacher, Mike Blackbird, Gail Bray, Mike Burkett, Mary Lou Reed
- Former Idaho state representatives: John Rusche (and former House minority leader), Liz Chavez, Bill Killen, Donna Pence, Anne Pasley-Stuart, James Ruchti, and Dan Rudolph

Democratic National Committee officials (current and former)

- Jessi Boyer, Idaho national committeewoman
- Larry Kenck, former chairman of the Idaho Democratic Party

Local and municipal officials (current and former)

- Tom Hearn, Coeur d'Alene school board member
- Elfreda Higgins, Garden City councilwoman (and former Idaho state representative)
- Mike Kennedy, former Coeur d'Alene city councilman
- Cari Miller, Lewiston city councilwoman
- Kristin Muchow, board member of the Greater Boise Auditorium District
- Beth Oppenheimer, Boise School board member
- Holli Woodings, Boise City Councilwoman (and former state representative)

Newspapers

- The Idaho Press-Tribune
- Times-News

Organizations

- Conservation Voters for Idaho
Paulette Jordan

U.S. Senator (former)

- Ben Nighthorse Campbell, Colorado (Republican)

State legislators (former)

- Former Idaho state senators: John Peavey

Individuals

- Cher, singer and actress
- Jim Dean, chair, Democracy for America
- Van Jones, CNN host

Organizations

- Democracy for America
- Indivisible
- International Union of Painters and Allied Trades
- Our Revolution

=== Debate ===
2018 Idaho gubernatorial election democratic primary debate
No.	Date	Host	Moderator	Link	Democratic	Democratic
Key: P Participant A Absent N Not invited I Invited W Withdrawn						
Key: P Participant A Absent N Not invited I Invited W Withdrawn					A.J. Balukoff	Paulette Jordan
1	April 23, 2018	Idaho Public Television	Melissa Davlin	PBS	P	P
2	May 1, 2018	KTVB; Northwest Nazarene University	Dee Sarton	YouTube	P	P

=== Results ===
Results by county: Jordan: 80–90%; 70–80%; 60–70%; 50–60%; 40–50%; Jordan/Balukoff tie: 40–50%; Balukoff: 50–60%; 60–70%

Democratic primary
Party	Candidate	Votes	%
Democratic	Paulette Jordan	38,483	58.4
Democratic	A.J. Balukoff	26,403	40.1
Democratic	Peter Dill	964	1.5
Total votes		65,850	100.0

== Independents ==
=== Candidates ===
==== Declared ====
- Adam Phillips
- Michael Richardson
- John Thomas Wiechec

== General election ==
=== Predictions ===
Source	Ranking	As of
The Cook Political Report	Safe R	October 26, 2018
The Washington Post	Safe R	November 5, 2018
FiveThirtyEight	Safe R	November 5, 2018
Rothenberg Political Report	Safe R	November 1, 2018
Sabato's Crystal Ball	Safe R	November 5, 2018
RealClearPolitics	Safe R	November 4, 2018
Daily Kos	Safe R	November 5, 2018
Fox News (Note: The Fox News Midterm Power Rankings uniquely does not contain a category for Safe/Solid races.)	Likely R	November 5, 2018
Politico	Safe R	November 5, 2018
Governing	Safe R	November 5, 2018

=== Debate ===
2018 Idaho gubernatorial election debate
No.	Date	Host	Moderator	Link	Republican	Democratic
Key: P Participant A Absent N Not invited I Invited W Withdrawn						
Key: P Participant A Absent N Not invited I Invited W Withdrawn					Brad Little	Paulette Jordan
1	October 15, 2018	IdahoPTV	Melissa Davlin	C-SPAN	P	P

=== Polling ===
Poll source	Date(s) administered	Sample size	Margin of error	Brad Little (R)	Paulette Jordan (D)	Bev Boeck (L)	Other	Undecided
Change Research	November 2–4, 2018	838	–	55%	39%	3%	2%	–
Clarity Campaign Labs (D-Idaho Voices for Change Now)	August 2–5, 2018	826	± 3.2%	36%	28%	–	5%	31%
Clarity Campaign Labs (D-Idaho Voices for Change Now)	July 12–15, 2018	1,061	± 2.8%	38%	28%	–	7%	26%
Dan Jones & Associates	June 22 – July 9, 2018	606	± 4.0%	43%	31%	5%	8%	13%

=== Results ===
Idaho gubernatorial election, 2018
Party	Candidate	Votes	%	±%
Republican	Brad Little	361,661	59.77%	+6.25%
Democratic	Paulette Jordan	231,081	38.19%	−0.36%
Libertarian	Bev "Angel" Boeck	6,551	1.08%	−2.99%
Constitution	Walter L. Bayes	5,787	0.96%	−0.23%
Independent	Lisa Marie (write-in)	51	0.01%	N/A
Total votes		605,131	100.00%	N/A
Republican hold				

==== By county ====
Count	Brad Little Republican		Paulette Jordan Democratic		Various candidates Other parties		Margin		Total
Count	#	%	#	%	#	%	#	%	Total
Ada	92,684	48.7%	94,772	49.7%	3,046	1.6%	-2,088	-1.0%	190,502
Adams	1,288	67.6%	579	30.4%	39	2.1%	709	37.2%	1,906
Bannock	14,975	51.5%	13,386	46.0%	725	2.5%	1,589	5.5%	29,086
Bear Lake	1,780	82.8%	307	14.3%	64	3.0%	1,473	68.5%	2,151
Benewah	2,672	71.0%	1,004	26.7%	87	2.3%	1,668	44.3%	3,763
Bingham	9,337	70.5%	3,515	26.5%	398	3.0%	5,822	44.0%	13,250
Blaine	3,063	29.2%	7,267	69.3%	157	1.5%	-4,204	-40.1%	10,487
Boise	2,374	67.6%	1,051	29.9%	85	2.5%	1,323	37.7%	3,510
Bonner	11,477	61.7%	6,749	36.3%	364	2.0%	4,728	27.4%	18,590
Bonneville	23,497	66.6%	10,699	30.3%	1,065	3.1%	12,798	36.3%	35,261
Boundary	3,101	72.6%	1,075	25.2%	95	2.2%	2,026	47.4%	4,271
Butte	788	76.4%	214	20.8%	29	2.8%	574	55.6%	1,031
Camas	371	69.0%	157	29.2%	10	1.8%	214	39.8%	538
Canyon	40,636	63.9%	21,839	34.3%	1,118	1.8%	18,797	29.6%	63,593
Caribou	1,824	80.5%	371	16.4%	72	3.1%	1,453	64.1%	2,267
Cassia	4,888	79.1%	1,111	18.0%	181	2.9%	3,777	61.1%	6,180
Clark	195	77.1%	47	18.6%	11	4.4%	148	58.5%	253
Clearwater	2,310	73.2%	779	24.7%	67	2.1%	1,531	48.5%	3,156
Custer	1,518	71.5%	545	25.7%	61	2.9%	973	45.8%	2,124
Elmore	4,582	65.2%	2,253	32.0%	196	2.8%	2,329	33.2%	7,031
Franklin	3,228	84.2%	416	10.9%	189	4.9%	2,812	73.3%	3,833
Fremont	3,798	79.4%	841	17.6%	145	3.0%	2,957	61.8%	4,784
Gem	5,438	76.2%	1,572	22.0%	131	1.8%	3,866	54.2%	7,141
Gooding	3,209	72.6%	1,110	25.1%	103	2.3%	2,099	47.5%	4,422
Idaho	5,478	78.0%	1,372	19.5%	177	2.5%	4,106	58.5%	7,027
Jefferson	7,125	81.8%	1,307	15.0%	277	3.2%	5,818	66.8%	8,709
Jerome	3,808	70.7%	1,440	26.7%	136	2.5%	2,368	44.0%	5,384
Kootenai	38,173	67.3%	17,620	31.1%	953	1.7%	20,553	36.2%	56,746
Latah	6,803	42.5%	8,981	56.1%	213	1.4%	-2,178	-13.6%	15,997
Lemhi	2,470	71.9%	883	25.7%	82	2.4%	1,587	46.2%	3,435
Lewis	1,051	75.2%	326	23.3%	20	1.5%	725	51.9%	1,397
Lincoln	1,022	68.7%	419	28.2%	47	3.2%	603	40.5%	1,488
Madison	6,887	78.5%	1,520	17.3%	366	4.2%	5,367	61.2%	8,773
Minidoka	3,849	74.7%	1,179	22.9%	127	2.5%	2,670	51.8%	5,155
Nez Perce	8,845	61.2%	5,385	37.3%	220	1.5%	3,460	23.9%	14,450
Oneida	1,249	82.4%	200	13.2%	67	4.5%	1,049	69.2%	1,516
Owyhee	2,613	75.4%	772	22.3%	82	2.4%	1,841	53.1%	3,467
Payette	5,553	73.1%	1,890	24.9%	152	2.0%	3,663	48.2%	7,595
Power	1,456	66.4%	681	31.0%	57	2.6%	775	35.4%	2,194
Shoshone	2,564	60.1%	1,623	38.1%	76	1.8%	941	22.0%	4,263
Teton	2,055	42.8%	2,636	54.9%	109	2.3%	-581	-12.1%	4,800
Twin Falls	16,102	65.7%	7,742	31.6%	648	2.6%	8,360	34.1%	24,492
Valley	2,676	51.5%	2,442	47.0%	81	1.5%	234	4.5%	5,199
Washington	2,849	72.8%	1,004	25.7%	61	1.6%	1,845	47.1%	3,914
Totals	361,661	59.8%	231,081	38.2%	12,389	2.0%	130,580	21.6%	605,131

Counties that flipped from Democratic to Republican

- Bannock (largest municipality: Pocatello)

==== By congressional district ====
Little won both congressional districts.

District	Little	Jordan	Representative
1st	63%	35%	Raúl Labrador (115th Congress)
1st	63%	35%	Russ Fulcher (116th Congress)
2nd	56%	42%	Mike Simpson

== See also ==
- Idaho lieutenant gubernatorial primary election, 2018
- Elections in Idaho
