= Idaho's 2nd congressional district =

U.S. House district for Idaho

Coordinates: 43°N 113°W

- Interactive map of district boundaries since January 3, 2023
- Representative: Mike Simpson; R–Idaho Falls
- Distribution: 67.03% urban; 32.97% rural
- Population (2025): 974,420
- Median household income: $82,454
- Ethnicity: 77.7% White; 14.2% Hispanic; 3.7% Two or more races; 1.7% Asian; 1.0% Black; 1.0% Native American; 0.6% other
- Cook PVI: R+13

Idaho's 2nd congressional district is one of two congressional districts in the U.S. state of Idaho, in the eastern portion of the state. Beginning with the 2012 election, the district expanded westward and now includes most of Boise, the state capital and largest city. The district is currently represented by Mike Simpson, a Republican of Idaho Falls. A former dentist in Blackfoot, he was first elected in 1998; the seat opened when his predecessor Mike Crapo successfully ran for the U.S. Senate.

== History ==
After statehood in 1890, Idaho had a single seat in Congress through the 1910 election, a statewide at-large seat. Following the 1910 census, Idaho gained its second seat in the House; it was first contested in 1912, but the state did not immediately apportion into two districts. Through the 1916 election, both were statewide at-large seats. The first election in Idaho with two congressional districts was in 1918.

The district has largely retained the same shape since the 1950s. Following the 2010 census and redistricting, the 2nd district was pushed slightly to the west, picking up much of northeast Ada County, including most of Boise. It now covers all of the capital north of Interstate 84. The 1st district had long been reckoned as "the Boise district", as it historically covered most of Boise. However, a significant increase in population directly west of Boise over the previous decade, in western Ada and Canyon counties, resulted in the 1st losing most of its share of the capital. The 1st continues to serve most of Boise's suburbs; in Ada County itself, it continues to include Meridian, Eagle, and west Boise, south of Interstate 84.

Other major cities in the 2nd district include Idaho Falls, Pocatello, Twin Falls, Rexburg, Hailey, and Sun Valley. The Church of Jesus Christ of Latter-day Saints has a strong presence in the district; a member of the LDS Church has represented this district continuously since 1951.

== Recent election results from statewide races ==
| Year | Office | Results |
|---|---|---|
| 2008 | President | McCain 60% - 37% |
| 2012 | President | Romney 66% - 34% |
| 2016 | President | Trump 54% - 30% |
| 2016 | Senate | Crapo 63% - 30% |
| 2018 | Governor | Little 56% - 42% |
| 2018 | Lt. Governor | McGeachin 55% - 45% |
| 2018 | Attorney General | Wasden 62% - 38% |
| 2020 | President | Trump 60% - 37% |
| 2020 | Senate | Risch 59% - 37% |
| 2022 | Senate | Crapo 57% - 34% |
| 2022 | Governor | Little 60% - 24% |
| 2022 | Lt. Governor | Bedke 60% - 36% |
| 2022 | Secretary of State | McGrane 68% - 32% |
| 2022 | Controller | Woolf 65% - 32% |
| 2022 | Treasurer | Ellsworth 66% - 34% |
| 2022 | Attorney General | Labrador 56% - 44% |
| 2024 | President | Trump 62% - 35% |

== Composition ==
The 2nd district includes the entirety of the following counties, with the exception of Ada, which it shares with the 1st district. Ada County municipalities included within the 2nd district include Avimor, Hidden Springs, Garden City, and more than half of Boise.

| # | County | Seat | Population |
|---|---|---|---|
| 1 | Ada | Boise | 524,673 |
| 5 | Bannock | Pocatello | 90,400 |
| 7 | Bear Lake | Paris | 6,766 |
| 11 | Bingham | Blackfoot | 50,395 |
| 13 | Blaine | Hailey | 25,041 |
| 19 | Bonneville | Idaho Falls | 131,366 |
| 23 | Butte | Arco | 2,758 |
| 25 | Camas | Fairfield | 1,232 |
| 29 | Caribou | Soda Springs | 7,219 |
| 31 | Cassia | Burley | 25,696 |
| 33 | Clark | Dubois | 801 |
| 37 | Custer | Challis | 4,532 |
| 39 | Elmore | Mountain Home | 29,724 |
| 41 | Franklin | Preston | 15,494 |
| 43 | Fremont | St. Anthony | 14,196 |
| 47 | Gooding | Gooding | 16,061 |
| 51 | Jefferson | Rigby | 34,198 |
| 53 | Jerome | Jerome | 25,479 |
| 59 | Lehmi | Salmon | 8,441 |
| 63 | Lincoln | Shoshone | 5,450 |
| 65 | Madison | Rexburg | 54,547 |
| 67 | Minidoka | Rupert | 22,480 |
| 71 | Oneida | Malad City | 4,953 |
| 77 | Power | American Falls | 8,253 |
| 81 | Teton | Driggs | 12,549 |
| 83 | Twin Falls | Twin Falls | 95,156 |

== List of members representing the district ==
| Representative | Party | Years | Cong ress | Electoral history |
|---|---|---|---|---|
District created March 4, 1919
| Addison Smith (Twin Falls) | Republican | March 4, 1919 – March 3, 1933 | 66th 67th 68th 69th 70th 71st 72nd | Redistricted from the at-large district and re-elected in 1918. Re-elected in 1920. Re-elected in 1922. Re-elected in 1924. Re-elected in 1926. Re-elected in 1928. Re-elected in 1930. Lost re-election. |
| Thomas Coffin (Pocatello) | Democratic | March 4, 1933 – June 8, 1934 | 73rd | Elected in 1932. Died. |
| Vacant | | June 6, 1934 – January 3, 1935 | 73rd | |
| D. Worth Clark (Pocatello) | Democratic | January 3, 1935 – January 3, 1939 | 74th 75th | Elected in 1934. Re-elected in 1936. Retired to run for U.S. Senator. |
| Henry Dworshak (Burley) | Republican | January 3, 1939 – November 5, 1946 | 76th 77th 78th 79th | Elected in 1938. Re-elected in 1940. Re-elected in 1942. Re-elected in 1944. Resigned when elected to U.S. Senate. |
| Vacant | | November 5, 1946 – January 3, 1947 | 79th | |
| John Sanborn (Hagerman) | Republican | January 3, 1947 – January 3, 1951 | 80th 81st | Elected in 1946. Re-elected in 1948. Retired to run for U.S. Senator. |
| Hamer Budge (Boise) | Republican | January 3, 1951 – January 3, 1961 | 82nd 83rd 84th 85th 86th | Elected in 1950. Re-elected in 1952. Re-elected in 1954. Re-elected in 1956. Re-elected in 1958. Lost re-election. |
| Ralph Harding (Blackfoot) | Democratic | January 3, 1961 – January 3, 1965 | 87th 88th | Elected in 1960. Re-elected in 1962. Lost re-election. |
| George Hansen (Pocatello) | Republican | January 3, 1965 – January 3, 1969 | 89th 90th | Elected in 1964. Re-elected in 1966. Retired to run for U.S. Senator. |
| Orval Hansen (Idaho Falls) | Republican | January 3, 1969 – January 3, 1975 | 91st 92nd 93rd | Elected in 1968. Re-elected in 1970. Re-elected in 1972. Lost renomination. |
| George Hansen (Pocatello) | Republican | January 3, 1975 – January 3, 1985 | 94th 95th 96th 97th 98th | Elected in 1974. Re-elected in 1976. Re-elected in 1978. Re-elected in 1980. Re-elected in 1982. Lost re-election. |
| Richard Stallings (Rexburg) | Democratic | January 3, 1985 – January 3, 1993 | 99th 100th 101st 102nd | Elected in 1984. Re-elected in 1986. Re-elected in 1988. Re-elected in 1990. Retired to run for U.S. Senator. |
| Mike Crapo (Idaho Falls) | Republican | January 3, 1993 – January 3, 1999 | 103rd 104th 105th | Elected in 1992. Re-elected in 1994. Re-elected in 1996. Retired to run for U.S. Senator. |
| Mike Simpson (Idaho Falls) | Republican | January 3, 1999 – present | 106th 107th 108th 109th 110th 111th 112th 113th 114th 115th 116th 117th 118th 119th | Elected in 1998. Re-elected in 2000. Re-elected in 2002. Re-elected in 2004. Re-elected in 2006. Re-elected in 2008. Re-elected in 2010. Re-elected in 2012. Re-elected in 2014. Re-elected in 2016. Re-elected in 2018. Re-elected in 2020. Re-elected in 2022. Re-elected in 2024. Re-elected in 2026. |

== Election history ==
=== 2002 ===
2002 Idaho's 2nd congressional district election
| Party | Candidate | Votes | % |
|---|---|---|---|
| Republican | Mike Simpson (incumbent) | 135,605 | 68.18 |
| Democratic | Edward Kinghorn | 57,769 | 29.05 |
| Libertarian | Gregory Corron | 5,508 | 2.77 |
| Total votes | | 198,882 | 100.00 |
| Turnout | | | |
| Republican hold | | | |

=== 2004 ===
2004 Idaho's 2nd congressional district election
| Party | Candidate | Votes | % |
|---|---|---|---|
| Republican | Mike Simpson (incumbent) | 193,704 | 70.74 |
| Democratic | Lin Whitworth | 80,133 | 29.26 |
| Total votes | | 273,837 | 100.00 |
| Turnout | | | |
| Republican hold | | | |

=== 2006 ===
2006 Idaho's 2nd congressional district election
| Party | Candidate | Votes | % |
|---|---|---|---|
| Republican | Mike Simpson (incumbent) | 132,262 | 62.00 |
| Democratic | Jim D. Hansen | 73,441 | 34.43 |
| Independent | Cameron Forth | 5,113 | 2.40 |
| Constitution | Travis J. Hedrick | 2,516 | 1.18 |
| Total votes | | 213,332 | 100.00 |
| Turnout | | | |
| Republican hold | | | |

=== 2008 ===
2008 Idaho's 2nd congressional district election
| Party | Candidate | Votes | % |
|---|---|---|---|
| Republican | Mike Simpson (incumbent) | 205,777 | 70.89 |
| Democratic | Debbie Holmes | 83,878 | 28.90 |
| No party | Others | 612 | 0.21 |
| Total votes | | 290,267 | 100.00 |
| Turnout | | | |
| Republican hold | | | |

=== 2010 ===
2010 Idaho's 2nd congressional district election
| Party | Candidate | Votes | % |
|---|---|---|---|
| Republican | Mike Simpson (incumbent) | 137,468 | 68.83 |
| Democratic | Mike Crawford | 48,749 | 24.41 |
| Independent | Brian Schad | 13,500 | 6.76 |
| Total votes | | 199,717 | 100.00 |
| Turnout | | | |
| Republican hold | | | |

=== 2012 ===
2012 Idaho's 2nd congressional district election
| Party | Candidate | Votes | % |
|---|---|---|---|
| Republican | Mike Simpson (incumbent) | 207,412 | 65.10 |
| Democratic | Nicole LeFavour | 110,847 | 34.80 |
| No party | Others | 235 | 0.10 |
| Total votes | | 318,494 | 100.00 |
| Turnout | | | |
| Republican hold | | | |

=== 2014 ===
2014 Idaho's 2nd congressional district election
| Party | Candidate | Votes | % |
|---|---|---|---|
| Republican | Mike Simpson (incumbent) | 131,492 | 61.36 |
| Democratic | Richard Stallings | 82,801 | 38.64 |
| Total votes | | 214,293 | 100.00 |
| Turnout | | | |
| Republican hold | | | |

=== 2016 ===
2016 Idaho's 2nd congressional district election
| Party | Candidate | Votes | % |
|---|---|---|---|
| Republican | Mike Simpson (incumbent) | 205,292 | 62.93 |
| Democratic | Jennifer Martinez | 95,940 | 29.41 |
| Constitution | Anthony Tomkins | 25,005 | 7.66 |
| Total votes | | 326,237 | 100.00 |
| Turnout | | | |
| Republican hold | | | |

=== 2018 ===
2018 Idaho's 2nd congressional district election
| Party | Candidate | Votes | % |
|---|---|---|---|
| Republican | Mike Simpson (incumbent) | 170,274 | 60.67 |
| Democratic | Aaron Swisher | 110,381 | 39.33 |
| Total votes | | 280,655 | 100.00 |
| Turnout | | | |
| Republican hold | | | |

=== 2020 ===
2020 Idaho's 2nd congressional district election
| Party | Candidate | Votes | % |
|---|---|---|---|
| Republican | Mike Simpson (incumbent) | 250,678 | 64.01 |
| Democratic | Aaron Swisher | 124,151 | 31.07 |
| Constitution | Pro-Life | 8,573 | 2.02 |
| Libertarian | Idaho Sierra Law | 7,940 | 2.00 |
| Total votes | | 391,342 | 100.00 |
| Republican hold | | | |

=== 2022 ===
2022 Idaho's 2nd congressional district election
| Party | Candidate | Votes | % |
|---|---|---|---|
| Republican | Mike Simpson (incumbent) | 172,448 | 63.6 |
| Democratic | Wendy Norman | 98,736 | 36.4 |
| Total votes | | 271,184 | 100.00 |
| Republican hold | | | |

=== 2024 ===
2024 Idaho's 2nd congressional district election
| Party | Candidate | Votes | % |
|---|---|---|---|
| Republican | Mike Simpson (incumbent) | 250,119 | 61.40 |
| Democratic | David Roth | 126,229 | 31.00 |
| Libertarian | Todd Corsetti | 21,310 | 5.20 |
| Constitution | Carla Sierra | 9,804 | 2.40 |
| Total votes | | 407,462 | 100.00 |
| Republican hold | | | |

== Historical district boundaries ==
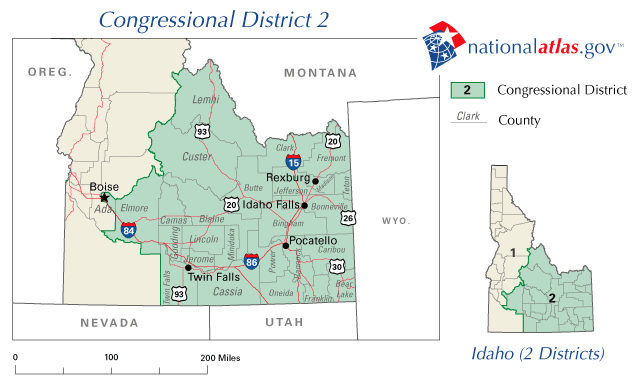
2003 - 2013

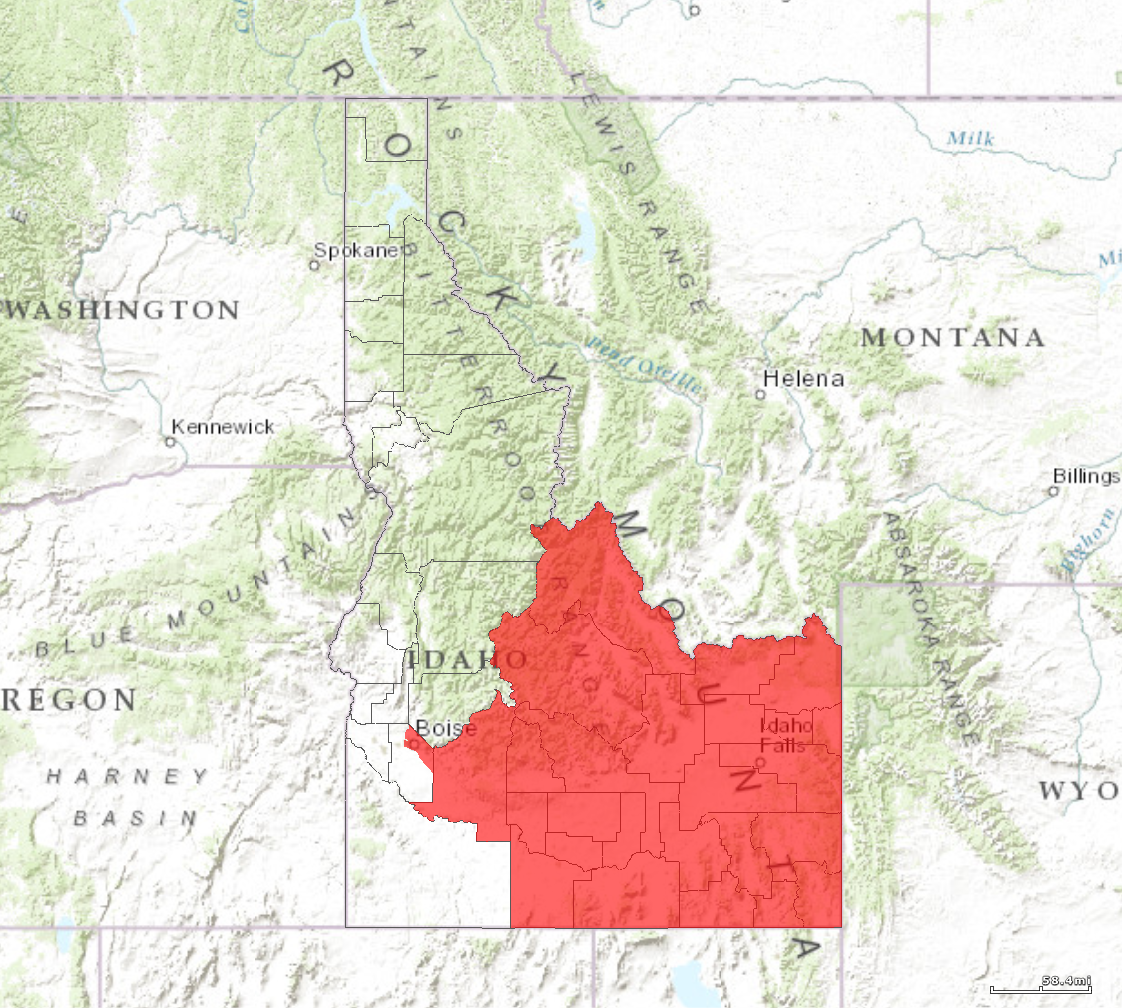
2013 – 2023

== See also ==
- Idaho's congressional districts
- List of United States congressional districts
