= 2014 Idaho Secretary of State election =

Idaho Secretary of State election, 2014
- November 4, 2014
Nominee	Lawerence Denney	Holli Woodings
Party	Republican	Democratic
Popular vote	241,851	188,353
Percentage	56.22%	43.78%
- Denney: 50–60% 60–70% 70–80% 80–90% Woodings: 50–60% 60–70%
Secretary of State before election
Ben Ysursa
Republican
Elected Secretary of State
Lawerence Denney
Republican

The 2014 Idaho Secretary of State election was held on November 4, 2014, to elect the Secretary of State of Idaho. Incumbent Republican Secretary of State Ben Ysursa did not seek re-election after 12 years of serving as the secretary of state.

== Background ==
Republican Incumbent Ben Ysursa decided not to seek re-election after serving since 2003.

== Primaries ==
=== Republican primary ===
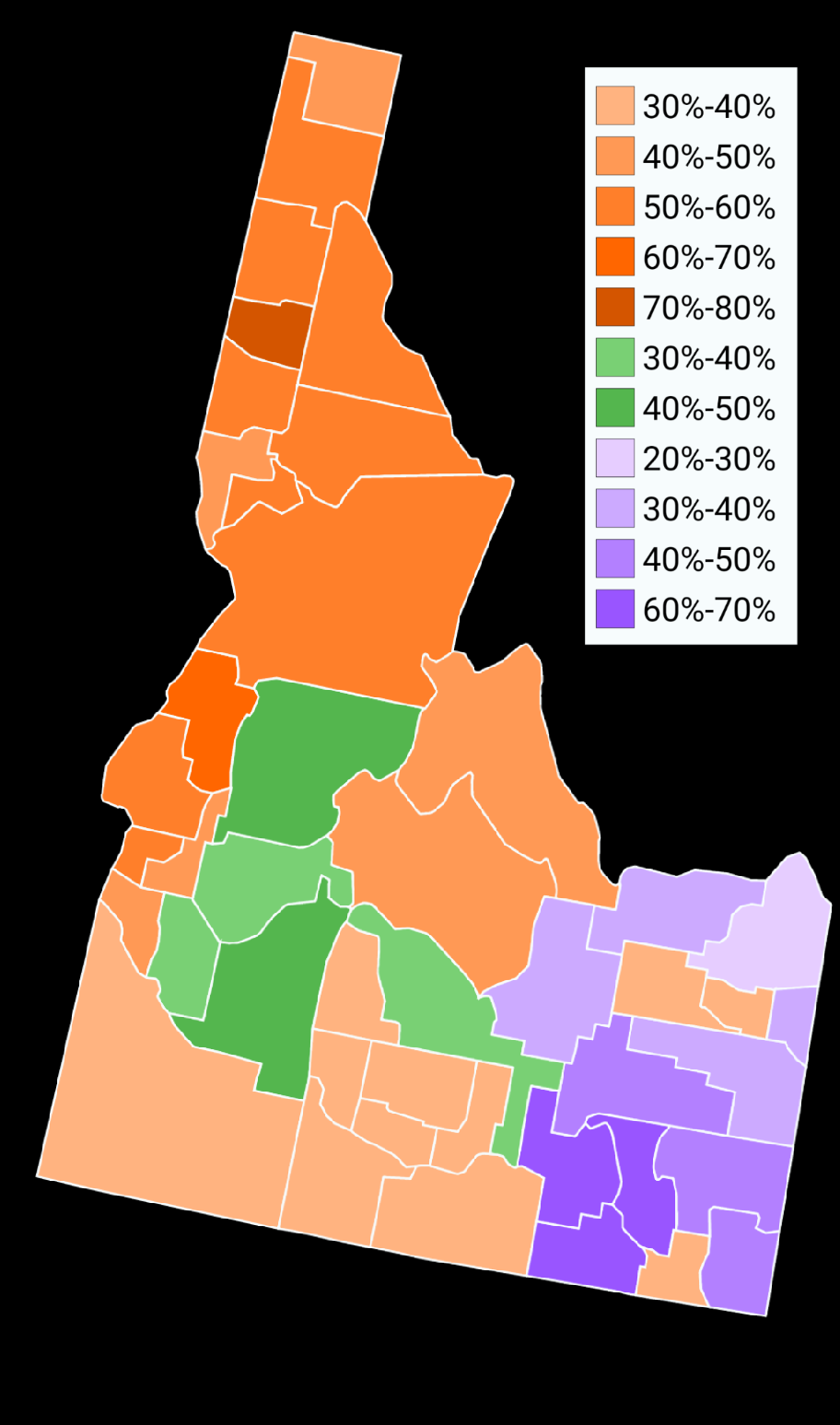
Map showing new years olds of the 2014 Idaho Secretary of State Republican primary by county. Counties won by Lawerence E. Denney are colored in Orange. Counties won by Phil McGrane are in Green. And counties won by Evan S. Frasure are on purple.

Idaho Secretary of State Republican Primary, 2014
Party	Candidate	Votes	%
Republican	Lawerence Denney	51,041	37.1%
Republican	Phil McGrane	38,336	27.9%
Republican	Evan Frasure	26,539	19.3%
Republican	Mitch Toryanski	21,630	15.7%
Majority		12,705	9.2%
Total votes		137,546	100.00%
Turnout			≈56.26

=== Democratic primary ===
Idaho Secretary of State Democratic Primary, 2014
Party	Candidate	Votes	%
Democratic	Holli Woodings	24,245	100.0%
Total votes		24,245	100.00%
Turnout			≈42.29

== General Election ==
=== Polling ===
Poll source	Date(s) administered	Sample size	Margin of error	Lawerence Denney (R)	Holli Woodings (D)	Undecided
Public Policy Polling	October 30–November 2, 2014	1,001	± 3.1%	51%	40%	9%
Public Policy Polling	October 9–12, 2014	522	± 4.3%	38%	35%	27%

=== Results ===
Idaho Secretary of State General Election, 2014
Party	Candidate	Votes	%
Republican	Lawerence Denney	241,851	56.22%
Democratic	Holli Woodings	188,353	43.78%
Majority		53,498	12.44%
Total votes		430,204	100.00%
Turnout			54.20

==== By county ====
Vote Break Down by County
	Lawerence Denney Republican		Holli Woodings Democrat		Margin		Total
County	Votes	%	Votes	%	Votes	%	Votes
Ada	55,303	43.56%	71,667	56.44%	16,364	12.88%	126,970
Adams	887	63.49%	510	36.51%	377	26.98%	1,397
Bannock	11,025	50.12%	10,972	49.88%	53	0.24%	21,997
Bear Lake	1,480	79.57%	380	20.43%	1,100	59.14%	1,860
Benewah	1,805	68.95%	813	31.05%	992	37.90%	2,618
Bingham	6,830	65.22%	3,643	34.78%	3,187	30.44%	10,473
Blaine	2,366	34.40%	4,511	65.60%	2,145	31.20%	6,877
Boise	1,629	61.89%	1,003	38.11%	626	23.78%	2,632
Bonner	7,862	63.06%	4,605	36.94%	3,257	26.12%	12,467
Bonneville	15,600	59.51%	10,613	40.49%	4,987	19.02%	26,213
Boundary	2,360	72.75%	884	27.25%	1,476	45.50%	3,244
Butte	775	70.58%	323	29.42%	452	41.16%	1,098
Camas	273	64.08%	153	35.92%	120	28.16%	426
Canyon	26,844	61.66%	16,688	38.34%	10,156	23.32%	43,532
Caribou	1,447	75.69%	465	24.32%	982	51.37%	1,912
Cassia	3,937	73.19%	1,442	26.81%	2,495	46.38%	5,379
Clark	160	72.40%	61	27.60%	99	44.80%	221
Clearwater	1,675	64.62%	917	35.38%	758	29.24%	2,592
Custer	1,220	70.07%	521	29.93%	699	40.14%	1,741
Elmore	3,108	60.41%	2,037	39.59%	1,071	20.82%	5,142
Franklin	2,405	85.25%	416	14.75%	1,989	70.50%	2,821
Fremont	2,897	72.41%	1,104	27.59%	1,793	44.82%	4,001
Gem	3,433	67.02%	1,689	32.98%	1,744	34.04%	5,122
Gooding	2,403	62.55%	1,439	37.45%	964	25.10%	2,403
Idaho	4,078	73.77%	1,450	26.23%	2,628	46.54%	5,528
Jefferson	5,138	74.02%	1,803	25.98%	3,335	48.04%	6,941
Jermoe	2,636	61.16%	1,674	38.84%	962	22.32%	4,310
Kootenai	24,253	66.47%	12,235	33.53%	12,018	32.94%	36,488
Latah	5,193	45.52%	6,214	54.48%	1,021	8.96%	11,407
Lemhi	2,050	71.50%	817	28.50%	1,233	43.00%	2,867
Lewis	783	66.64%	392	33.36%	391	33.28%	1,175
Lincoln	770	59.37%	527	40.63%	243	18.74%	1,297
Madison	5,132	77.13%	1,522	22.87%	3,610	54.26%	6,654
Minidoka	2,874	63.87%	1,626	36.13%	1,248	27.74%	4,500
Nez Perce	5,946	54.17%	5,031	45.83%	915	8.34%	10,977
Oneida	871	80.20%	215	19.80%	656	60.40%	1,086
Owyhee	1,849	72.65%	696	27.35%	1,153	45.30%	2,545
Payette	3,650	64.81%	1,982	35.19%	1,668	29.62%	5,632
Power	1,236	60.29%	814	39.71%	422	20.58%	2,050
Shoshone	1,628	50.06%	1,624	49.94%	4	0.12%	3,252
Teton	1,771	46.35%	2,050	53.65%	279	7.30%	3,821
Twin Falls	10,527	57.04%	7,927	42.96%	2,600	14.08%	18,454
Valley	1,711	49.51%	1,745	50.49%	34	0.98%	3,456
Washington	2,031	63.79%	1,153	36.21%	878	27.58%	3,184
