= 2022 Idaho Secretary of State election =

- November 8, 2022
Nominee	Phil McGrane	Shawn Keenan
Party	Republican	Democratic
Popular vote	418,945	159,189
Percentage	72.12%	27.40%
- McGrane: 50–60% 60–70% 70–80% 80–90% >90% Keenan: 50–60% 60–70%
Secretary of State before election
Lawerence Denney
Republican
Elected Secretary of State
Phil McGrane
Republican

The 2022 Idaho Secretary of State election took place on November 8, 2022, to elect the next secretary of state of Idaho. Incumbent Republican Lawerence Denney was eligible to seek re-election but declined to run for a third term.

== Republican primary ==
Phil McGrane won the Republican primary for Idaho Secretary of State on May 17, 2022.

GOP primary results by county McGrane: 40–50% 50–60%; Moon: 40–50% 50–60% 60–70%

=== Candidates ===
==== Nominee ====
- Phil McGrane, Ada County clerk and candidate for Secretary of State in 2014

==== Eliminated in primary ====
- Dorothy Moon, member of the Idaho House of Representatives from the 8th district (2016–)
- Mary Souza, member of the Idaho Senate from the 4th district (2014–)

==== Withdrew ====
- Chad Houck, chief deputy secretary of state

==== Endorsements ====
Phil McGrane

Statewide officials

- Phil Batt, Governor of Idaho (1995–1999)
- Dirk Kempthorne, Governor of Idaho (1999–2006)
- Butch Otter, Governor of Idaho (2007–2019)
- Ben Ysursa, Secretary of State of Idaho (2003–2015)

Organizations

- AFL CIO
Dorothy Moon

Organizations

- America First Secretary of State Coalition

=== Debate ===
2022 Idaho Secretary of State republican primary debate
No.	Date	Host	Moderator	Link	Republican	Republican	Republican
Key: P Participant A Absent N Not invited I Invited W Withdrawn							
Key: P Participant A Absent N Not invited I Invited W Withdrawn					Phil McGrane	Dorothy Moon	Mary Souza
1	Apr. 26, 2022	Idaho Public Television	Melissa Davlin	YouTube	P	P	P
1	Apr. 28, 2022	KTVB	Doug Petcash	YouTube	P	P	P

=== Results ===
2022 Idaho Secretary of State Republican primary
Party	Candidate	Votes	%
Republican	Phil McGrane	114,348	43.1%
Republican	Dorothy Moon	109,952	41.4%
Republican	Mary Souza	41,208	15.5%
Total votes		265,508	100%

== Democratic primary ==
=== Candidates ===
==== Nominee ====
- Shawn Keenan, mortgage broker

=== Results ===
Democratic primary results
Party	Candidate	Votes	%
Democratic	Shawn Keenan	31,804	100.0
Total votes		31,804	100.0

== General election ==
=== Predictions ===
Source	Ranking	As of
Sabato's Crystal Ball	Safe R	December 1, 2021
Elections Daily	Safe R	November 7, 2022

=== Results ===
2022 Idaho Secretary of State election
Party	Candidate	Votes	%
Republican	Phil McGrane	418,945	72.12
Democratic	Shawn Keenan	159,819	27.40
Independent	Garth G. Gaylord (write-in)	2,778	0.48
Total votes		580,912	100.00
Republican hold			

==== By county ====
County	Phil McGrane Republican		Shawn Keenan Democratic		Garth Gaylord Other parties	
County	#	%	#	%	#	%
Ada	115,747	63.48%	65,744	36.05%	858	0.47%
Adams	1,644	83.03%	336	16.97%	0	0.00%
Bannock	15,785	62.61%	9,373	37.18%	53	0.21%
Bear Lake	2,027	90.82%	205	9.18%	0	0.00%
Benewah	2,816	83.14%	571	16.86%	0	0.0%
Bingham	10,253	84.28%	1,872	15.39%	40	0.33%
Blaine	3,496	36.18%	6,121	63.34%	47	0.49%
Boise	2,704	80.81%	642	19.19%	0	0.00%
Bonner	14,412	71.65%	5,554	27.61%	148	0.74%
Bonneville	26,348	77.03%	7,786	22.76%	71	0.21%
Boundary	4,218	83.69%	799	15.85%	23	0.46%
Butte	857	87.99%	117	12.01%	0	0.00%
Camas	431	83.20%	87	16.80%	0	0.00%
Canyon	44,744	77.91%	12,098	21.06%	590	1.03%
Caribou	1,864	89.19%	223	10.67%	3	0.14%
Cassia	5,131	89.31%	569	9.90%	45	0.78%
Clark	189	92.65%	15	7.35%	0	0.00%
Clearwater	2,528	81.71%	553	17.87%	13	0.42%
Custer	1,600	82.05%	350	17.95%	0	0.00%
Elmore	5,132	79.00%	1,364	21.00%	0	0.00%
Franklin	3,857	91.10%	363	8.57%	14	0.33%
Fremont	3,667	87.16%	540	12.84%	0	0.00%
Gem	6,320	85.99%	1,030	14.01%	0	0.00%
Gooding	3,322	83.78%	634	15.99%	9	0.23%
Idaho	6,157	86.05%	998	13.95%	0	0.00%
Jefferson	8,072	90.24%	873	9.76%	0	0.00%
Jerome	3,929	81.91%	817	17.03%	51	1.06%
Kootenai	46,503	77.03%	13,459	22.29%	406	0.67%
Latah	8,062	54.17%	6,787	45.61%	33	0.22%
Lemhi	2,879	80.37%	693	19.35%	10	0.28%
Lewis	1,147	84.96%	196	14.52%	7	0.52%
Lincoln	1,078	82.73%	224	17.19%	1	0.08%
Madison	7,114	87.30%	1,035	12.70%	0	0.00%
Minidoka	4,052	86.93%	601	12.89%	8	0.17%
Nez Perce	9,462	71.25%	3,818	28.75%	0	0.00%
Oneida	1,432	90.18%	151	9.51%	5	0.31%
Owyhee	2,775	86.72%	425	13.28%	0	0.00%
Payette	6,411	85.63%	1,076	14.37%	0	0.00%
Power	1,503	76.92%	448	22.93%	3	0.15%
Shoshone	2,887	72.10%	1,117	27.90%	0	0.00%
Teton	2,254	48.72%	2,372	51.28%	0	0.00%
Twin Falls	17,549	77.89%	4,762	21.14%	219	0.97%
Valley	3,280	63.66%	1,864	36.18%	8	0.16%
Washington	3,307	86.25%	527	13.75%	0	0.00%
Totals	418,945	72.12%	159,819	27.40%	2,778	0.48%

Counties that flipped from Democratic to Republican

- Latah (largest municipality: Moscow)
- Nez Perce (largest municipality: Lewiston)

==== By congressional district ====
McGrane won both congressional districts.

District	McGrane	Keenan	Representative
1st	76%	23%	Russ Fulcher
2nd	68%	32%	Mike Simpson
