= 2026 Idaho Secretary of State election =

- November 3, 2026
- Reporting: 98.9% as of 6:24 PM MST
Nominee	Phil McGrane	Shawn Keenan
Party	Republican	Democratic
Popular vote	472,356	228,585
Percentage	67.4%	32.6%
- McGrane: 50–60% 60–70% 70–80% 80–90% Keenan: 50–60% 60–70%
Secretary of State before election
Phil McGrane
Republican
Elected Secretary of State
Phil McGrane
Republican

The 2026 Idaho Secretary of State election took place on November 3, 2026, to elect the Idaho Secretary of State. Incumbent Republican Secretary of State Phil McGrane was re-elected to a second term in office.

== Republican primary ==
=== Candidates ===
==== Nominee ====
- Phil McGrane, incumbent secretary of state

=== Results ===
Republican primary results
Party	Candidate	Votes	%
Republican	Phil McGrane (incumbent)	188,149	100.0
Total votes		188,149	100.0

== Democratic primary ==
=== Candidates ===
==== Nominee ====
- Shawn Keenan, nominee for Secretary of State in 2022

=== Results ===
Democratic primary results
Party	Candidate	Votes	%
Democratic	Shawn Keenan	43,139	100.0
Total votes		43,139	100.0

== See also ==
- 2026 United States secretary of state elections
- 2026 Idaho elections
