= 2022 Idaho State Treasurer election =

Idaho State Treasurer election
- November 8, 2022
- Turnout: 57.2%
Nominee	Julie Ellsworth	Deborah Silver
Party	Republican	Democratic
Popular vote	412,502	167,596
Percentage	71.11%	28.89%
- Ellsworth: 50–60% 60–70% 70–80% 80–90% >90% Silver: 50–60% 60–70%
Treasurer before election
Julie Ellsworth
Republican
Elected Treasurer
Julie Ellsworth
Republican

The 2022 Idaho State Treasurer election was held on November 8, 2022, to elect the next treasurer of Idaho. Incumbent Republican Julie Ellsworth won re-election, defeating Democratic challenger Deborah Silver.

The primaries were on May 17, 2022.

== Republican primary ==
=== Candidates ===
==== Nominee ====
- Julie Ellsworth, incumbent State Treasurer of Idaho.

== Democratic primary ==
=== Candidates ===
==== Nominee ====
- Jill L. Ellsworth

Although Jill Ellsworth was elected to be the Democratic candidate, she later withdrew from the race. On August 16, the Idaho Democratic Party Central Committee appointed Deborah Silver as their candidate for State Treasurer.

== General election ==
=== Results ===
2022 Idaho State Treasurer election
Party	Candidate	Votes	%	±%
Republican	Julie Ellsworth (incumbent)	412,502	71.11%	−28.89%
Democratic	Deborah Silver	167,596	28.89%	+28.89%
Total votes		580,098	100.00%	
Republican hold				

==== By county ====
County	Julie Ellsworth Republican		Deborah Silver Democratic	
County	#	%	#	%
Ada	108,099	59.90%	72,352	40.10%
Adams	1,636	82.29%	352	17.71%
Bannock	15,686	62.55%	9,393	37.45%
Bear Lake	2,029	90.82%	205	9.18%
Benewah	2,863	84.48%	526	15.52%
Bingham	10,229	84.61%	1,860	15.39%
Blaine	3,495	36.17%	6,168	63.83%
Boise	2,686	79.66%	686	20.34%
Bonner	15,020	73.58%	5,394	26.42%
Bonneville	26,141	77.08%	7,774	22.92%
Boundary	4,302	84.39%	796	15.61%
Butte	864	88.34%	114	11.66%
Camas	415	81.37%	95	18.63%
Canyon	44,724	77.69%	12,844	22.31%
Caribou	1,837	88.74%	233	11.26%
Cassia	5,138	89.47%	605	10.53%
Clark	187	91.22%	18	8.78%
Clearwater	2,530	82.17%	549	17.83%
Custer	1,611	81.32%	370	18.68%
Elmore	5,089	78.52%	1,392	21.48%
Franklin	3,898	92.13%	333	7.87%
Fremont	3,698	87.53%	527	12.47%
Gem	6,351	85.13%	1,109	14.87%
Gooding	3,270	82.70%	684	17.30%
Idaho	6,263	85.67%	1,048	14.33%
Jefferson	8,142	90.62%	843	9.38%
Jerome	3,864	80.52%	935	19.48%
Kootenai	47,957	78.08%	13,466	21.92%
Latah	8,001	54.14%	6,776	45.86%
Lemhi	2,908	81.00%	682	19.00%
Lewis	1,157	85.64%	194	14.36%
Lincoln	1,059	81.03%	248	18.97%
Madison	7,167	87.74%	1,001	12.26%
Minidoka	4,007	86.32%	635	13.68%
Nez Perce	9,403	71.03%	3,836	28.97%
Oneida	1,430	90.68%	147	9.32%
Owyhee	2,787	86.34%	441	13.66%
Payette	6,377	85.28%	1,101	14.72%
Power	1,468	75.98%	464	24.02%
Shoshone	2,945	73.51%	1,061	26.49%
Teton	2,254	48.93%	2,353	51.07%
Twin Falls	17,070	75.76%	5,463	24.24%
Valley	3,167	61.70%	1,966	38.30%
Washington	3,278	85.48%	557	14.52%
Totals	412,502	71.11%	167,596	28.89%

Counties that flipped from Republican to Democratic

- Latah (largest municipality: Moscow)
- Blaine (largest municipality: Hailey)

==== By congressional district ====
Ellsworth won both congressional districts.

District	Ellsworth	Silver	Representative
1st	76%	24%	Russ Fulcher
2nd	66%	34%	Mike Simpson
