= Mike Moyle =

American politician from Idaho

42nd Speaker of the Idaho House of Representatives
- Incumbent
- Assumed office December 1, 2022
- Preceded by: Scott Bedke

Majority Leader of the Idaho House of Representatives
- In office December 7, 2006 – November 30, 2022
- Preceded by: Lawerence Denney
- Succeeded by: Megan Blanksma

Member of the Idaho House of Representatives
- Incumbent
- Assumed office December 1, 1998
- Preceded by: Dave Bivens
- Constituency: 14th district Seat A (1998–2022); 10th district Seat A (2022–present)

Personal details
- Born: December 7, 1964 (age 61)
- Party: Republican
- Spouses: Sue Bradbury (div. 2015) Janet Trujillo (m. 2016)
- Children: 3 (with Bradbury)
- Education: Brigham Young University, Utah (attended)
- Website: Campaign website

Mike Moyle (born December 7, 1964) is a Republican member of the Idaho House of Representatives since 1998 in the District 10 A seat. He has served as Idaho House Speaker since 2022. Moyle was the House Majority Leader from December 7, 2006, to 2022. As of 2022, he is the longest serving current member of the Idaho House of Representatives.

== Education ==
Moyle graduated from Meridian High School and attended Brigham Young University.

== Idaho House of Representatives ==
Moyle challenged Representative Dave Bivens in the 1998 Republican Primary and won the nomination by 8 votes. He was elected in the general election and has been reelected every two years since. He currently serves as House Majority Leader, a position he has held since 2006. He previously served as Majority Caucus Chairman from 2002 to 2006.

In 2021, Moyle proposed a bill which would make it a felony to "collect or convey" other people's ballots. The bill drew criticism from both sides of the aisle, including from the incumbent Majority Caucus Chair Megan Blanksma.

=== Committee assignments ===
- Resources and Conservation Committee
- Revenue and Taxation Committee
- Ways and Means Committee

Moyle previously served on the Health and Welfare Committee from 1998 to 2002.

== Elections ==
District 14 House Seat A - part of Ada County
Year	Candidate	Votes	Pct	Candidate	Votes	Pct	Candidate	Votes	Pct
1998 primary	Mike Moyle	2,338	50.2%	Dave Bivens (incumbent)	2,324	49.8%			
1998 general	Mike Moyle	16,067	100%						
2000 primary	Mike Moyle (incumbent)	6,333	100%						
2000 general	Mike Moyle (incumbent)	20,214	69.4%	Janis Foote	7,759	26.7%	Glida Bothwell	1,137	3.9%
2002 primary	Mike Moyle (incumbent)	3,094	57.7%	Dean Van Engelen	2,268	42.3%			
2002 general	Mike Moyle (incumbent)	9,674	65.4%	Claude Shubert	5,111	34.6%			
2004 primary	Mike Moyle (incumbent)	3,218	100%						
2004 general	Mike Moyle (incumbent)	19,842	100%						
2006 primary	Mike Moyle (incumbent)	4,723	100%						
2006 general	Mike Moyle (incumbent)	16,949	100%						
2008 primary	Mike Moyle (incumbent)	4,191	69.3%	Nancy Merrill (W/I)	1,853	30.7%			
2008 general	Mike Moyle (incumbent)	21,405	65.8%	Michelle Waddell	11,124	34.2%			
2010 primary	Mike Moyle (incumbent)	6,574	100%						
2010 general	Mike Moyle (incumbent)	17,678	72.6%	William Young	17,678	27.4%			
2012 primary	Mike Moyle (incumbent)	3,212	100%						
2012 general	Mike Moyle (incumbent)	18,045	100%						
2014 primary	Mike Moyle (incumbent)	3,826	100%						
2014 general	Mike Moyle (incumbent)	11,355	68.1%	Jane Rohling	5,308	31.9%			
2016 primary	Mike Moyle (incumbent)	3,106	76.2%	Michael Greenway	972	23.8%			
2016 general	Mike Moyle (incumbent)	19,107	71.2%	Jane Rohling	7,744	28.8%			

Idaho House of Representatives
Preceded by Lawerence Denney	Majority Leader of the Idaho House of Representatives; 2006–2022	Succeeded by Megan Blanksma
Political offices
Preceded by Scott Bedke	Speaker of the Idaho House of Representatives; 2022–present	Incumbent
