= Dorothy Moon =

American politician and business person from Idaho

Chair of the Idaho Republican Party
- Incumbent
- Assumed office July 16, 2022
- Preceded by: Tom Luna

Member of the Idaho House of Representatives from the 8B district
- In office December 1, 2016 – November 30, 2022
- Preceded by: Merrill Beyeler
- Succeeded by: Megan Blanksma (redistricting)

Personal details
- Born: May 1958 (age 68) Kansas City, Missouri, U.S.
- Party: Republican
- Spouse: Darr Moon
- Children: 2
- Education: Missouri State University (BS, MS)

Dorothy Moon (born May 1958) is an American far-right politician who served as a Republican member of Idaho House of Representatives from the 8B district from 2016 to 2022. Moon has been the Chair of Idaho Republican Party since July 2022.

== Early life and education ==
Born in Kansas City, Missouri, Moon grew up near the Ozark Mountains. She earned a Bachelor of Science in secondary education and a Master of Science in resource planning from Missouri State University.

== Career ==
Moon moved to Idaho in 1994. She was a special education director and science teacher at Challis High School, retiring in 2012. Since 1994, she has been president of Moon & Associates, Inc, an engineering and surveying company, and owns a gold mining operation in central Idaho. According to her official biography, she took part in a 1992 Antarctic expedition with Lamont Doherty Geological Observatory.

In 2009, Moon became involved with the Tea Party movement. She ran as a Republican for Idaho House of Representatives for the 8B district in 2016 and won the November 2016 election, defeating Ammon Emanuel Prolife with 87.3% of the votes. She was re-elected in the November 2018 general election. The district consists of Lemhi, Custer, Boise, Gem, and Valley counties.

In the 2022 elections, Moon sought the Republican nomination for Secretary of State of Idaho. Moon made baseless claims of voter fraud, claiming on the Idaho House floor without evidence that people from Canada came into Idaho to vote in the 2020 United States presidential election. Moon lost the primary race to Phil McGrane.

== Idaho Republican Party ==
In July 2022, Moon was elected chair of the Idaho Republican Party, defeating incumbent Tom Luna by a vote of 434–287. She drew praise from conservatives and libertarians for her hard-right voting record. Take Back Idaho, a group of Idaho Republicans who oppose extremism, decried her election as "absolutely disturbing."

As chairwoman, Moon and her allies clashed with opponents from within the state Republican Party. The Republican Central Committees in Power County and Bingham County clashed with Moon over her efforts to invalidate elections to the local Republican organizations, with the Bingham County Republican officials unsuccessfully suing the state Republican Party in court. Moon and the state Republican Party prevailed in the Bingham County suit when Judge Darren Simpson ruled that the leadership of the Bingham County Republicans was invalid. Subsequently, Moon presided over the procedurally-correct election of the Bingham County GOP Chairman.

Moon banned media from observing the March 2024 Republican caucuses, a decision criticized by the Idaho Statesman editorial board. In December 2023, Luna and another former Idaho Republican Party chair, Trent Clark, criticized Moon for undertaking "purges, division and expulsions" within the state party, writing that the party under Moon had "veered significantly from the inclusive big tent party envisioned by Ronald Reagan."

In June 2024, Moon was reelected as chair of the Idaho Republican Party, defeating former Idaho Legislator Mary Souza by a vote of 376 to 228.

Moon won a historical third term as chair of the Idaho Republican Party at the June 2026 Convention, defeating Steven Thayn and Mark Fuller with 306 votes.

Moon has had Tyler Kelly, Kiira Turnbow, Ryan Thompson, and Anthony Tirino as executive directors.

== Political positions ==
Moon is part of the far-right, which gained strength in Idaho politics in the 2020s. She is a member of the John Birch Society.

=== Militia movements ===
Moon is a supporter of Eric Parker, a right-wing militia movement leader who pleaded guilty to the misdemeanor of obstructing a court order, arising from his role in the 2014 Bundy standoff in Nevada, in which armed men faced off with federal agents at a ranch near Bunkerville, Nevada. Moon organized a letter-writing campaign on Parker's behalf, and introduced him to applause in a session of the state House.

=== Education standards ===
In 2020, Moon opposed the adoption of proposed state educational standards for English, literacy, and science; she specifically objected to what she contended was a negative portrayal of logging, mining and other resource extraction industries, and opposed content on the adverse environmental impacts of logging and dams.

=== Environment ===
In 2021, Moon sponsored legislation that called for the killing of 90% of the state's gray wolves. Moon also supported a measure to urge Congress to revoke "wilderness study area" designation from large swaths of Idaho land, as well as a separate measure to urging Congress to restrict the ability of private landowners to sell their land to conservation organizations for transfer to a federal agency.

=== Vaccines and COVID-19 ===
In March 2020, during the COVID-19 pandemic in Idaho, Moon promoted an end-of-session party in downtown Boise, despite public health advice to avoid large in-person gatherings to prevent the spread of the disease. In October 2020, she was one of several Republican Idaho elected officials to appear in an Idaho Freedom Foundation video questioning the existence of the pandemic.

In February 2021, Moon supported a measure to ban state contractors from requiring employees to be vaccinated (against COVID-19 or any other disease). During the legislative debate, Moon was one of several Republican state representatives who spread anti-vaccine misinformation, claiming that her son became autistic after receiving a vaccine. During the debate, Moon said: "There's no way another Moon will ever take a vaccine until the end of any of our lives."

In March 2021, Moon and fellow state Representative Heather Scott organized a demonstration in support of a bill to terminate the COVID-19 emergency in Idaho; the rally featured multiple face mask burnings in burn barrels.

=== Election of Joe Biden ===
Moon has said she does not believe Joe Biden was legitimately elected president of the United States. Days after her election as party chair in July 2022, the party was scheduled to consider a resolution declaring as such.

== Personal life ==
Moon's husband is Darr, a licensed civil engineer and land surveyor involved in Gold mining, who serves on the national council of the John Birch Society. They have two children. They live near Stanley.

== Electoral history ==
=== 2020 Idaho House of Representatives election ===
Seat B

Idaho Legislative District 8 House Seat B Republican Primary Election, 2020
Party	Candidate	Votes	%
Idaho Republican Party	Dorothy Moon (incumbent)	7,279	63.6
Idaho Republican Party	LaVerne Sessions	4,163	36.4
Total votes		11,442	100.0

Idaho Legislative District 8 House Seat B General Election, 2020
Party	Candidate	Votes	%
Idaho Republican Party	Dorothy Moon (incumbent)	23,300	100.0
Total votes		23,300	100.0
Idaho Republican Party hold			

=== 2022 Idaho Secretary of State Republican primary election ===
Party	Candidate	Votes	%
Republican	Phil McGrane	113,894	43.0%
Republican	Dorothy Moon	109,690	41.5%
Republican	Mary Souza	41,057	15.5%

Party political offices
Preceded by Tom Luna	Chair of the Idaho Republican Party; 2022–present	Incumbent
