= 2010 Idaho Secretary of State election =

2010 downballot race in Idaho

- November 2, 2010

Nominee	Ben Ysursa	Mack Sermon
Party	Republican	Democratic
Popular vote	326,453	113,164
Percentage	74.26%	25.74%
- County results Ysursa: 50–60% 60–70% 70–80% 80–90%
Secretary of State before election
Ben Ysursa
Republican Party
Elected Secretary of State
Ben Ysursa
Republican Party

The 2010 Idaho Secretary of State election was held on November 2, 2010, to elect the Secretary of State of Idaho. Incumbent Republican Secretary of State Ben Ysursa won re-election to a third term.

== Republican Nominee ==
- Ben Ysursa, incumbent.

=== Primary results ===
Republican Primary results
Party	Candidate	Votes	%
Republican	Ben Ysursa (incumbent)	136,512	100%
Total votes		136,512	100%

== Democratic primary ==
- Mack Sermon, instructor.

=== Primary results ===
Democratic primary results
Party	Candidate	Votes	%
Democratic	Mack Sermon	23,919	100%
Total votes		23,919	100%

== General Election ==
Idaho Secretary of State General Election, 2010
Party	Candidate	Votes	%
Republican	Ben Ysursa (incumbent)	326,453	74.26%
Democratic	Mack Sermon	113,164	25.74%
Total votes		439,617	100%
Republican hold			
