= Idaho's 18th legislative district =

American legislative district

Idaho's 18th legislative district is one of 35 districts of the Idaho Legislature. It is currently represented by Janie Ward-Engelking, Democrat of Boise, Ilana Rubel, Democrat of Boise, and Brooke Green, Democrat of Boise.

== District profile ==
=== 2012–present ===
District 18 currently consists of a portion of Ada County.

Legislature	Session	Senate	House Seat A	House Seat B
62nd (2012 - 2014)	1st	Branden Durst (D)	Janie Ward-Engelking (D)	Phylis King (D)
62nd (2012 - 2014)	2nd	Janie Ward-Engelking (D)	Ilana Rubel (D)	Phylis King (D)
63rd (2014 - 2016)	1st	Janie Ward-Engelking (D)	Ilana Rubel (D)	Phylis King (D)
63rd (2014 - 2016)	2nd	Janie Ward-Engelking (D)	Ilana Rubel (D)	Phylis King (D)
64th (2016 - 2018)	1st	Janie Ward-Engelking (D)	Ilana Rubel (D)	Phylis King (D)
64th (2016 - 2018)	2nd	Janie Ward-Engelking (D)	Ilana Rubel (D)	Phylis King (D)
65th (2018 - 2020)	1st	Janie Ward-Engelking (D)	Ilana Rubel (D)	Brooke Green (D)
65th (2018 - 2020)	2nd	Janie Ward-Engelking (D)	Ilana Rubel (D)	Brooke Green (D)
66th (2020 - 2022)	1st	Janie Ward-Engelking (D)	Ilana Rubel (D)	Brooke Green (D)
66th (2020 - 2022)	2nd	Janie Ward-Engelking (D)	Ilana Rubel (D)	Brooke Green (D)

=== 2002–2012 ===
From 2002 to 2012, District 18 consisted of a portion of Ada County.

Legislature	Session	Senate	House Seat A	House Seat B
57th (2002 - 2004)	1st	Sheila Sorensen (R)	Debbie Field (R)	Julie Ellsworth (R)
57th (2002 - 2004)	2nd	Sheila Sorensen (R)	Debbie Field (R)	Julie Ellsworth (R)
58th (2004 - 2006)	1st	Kate Kelly (D)	Debbie Field (R)	Julie Ellsworth (R)
58th (2004 - 2006)	2nd	Kate Kelly (D)	Debbie Field (R)	Julie Ellsworth (R)
59th (2006 - 2008)	1st	Kate Kelly (D)	Branden Durst (D)	Phylis King (D)
59th (2006 - 2008)	2nd	Kate Kelly (D)	Branden Durst (D)	Phylis King (D)
60th (2008 - 2010)	1st	Kate Kelly (D)	Branden Durst (D)	Phylis King (D)
60th (2008 - 2010)	2nd	Kate Kelly (D)	Branden Durst (D)	Phylis King (D)
61st (2010 - 2012)	1st	Mitch Toryanski (R)	Julie Ellsworth (R)	Phylis King (D)
61st (2010 - 2012)	2nd	Mitch Toryanski (R)	Julie Ellsworth (R)	Phylis King (D)

=== 1992–2002 ===
From 1992 to 2002, District 18 consisted of a portion of Ada County.

Legislature	Session	Senate	House Seat A	House Seat B
51st (1992 - 1994)	1st	Roger Madsen (R)	Bill Sali (R)	Fred Tilman (R)
51st (1992 - 1994)	2nd	Roger Madsen (R)	Bill Sali (R)	Fred Tilman (R)
52nd (1994 - 1996)	1st	Jim Risch (R)	Bill Sali (R)	Fred Tilman (R)
52nd (1994 - 1996)	2nd	Jim Risch (R)	Bill Sali (R)	Fred Tilman (R)
53rd (1996 - 1998)	1st	Jim Risch (R)	Bill Sali (R)	Fred Tilman (R)
53rd (1996 - 1998)	2nd	Jim Risch (R)	Bill Sali (R)	Fred Tilman (R)
54th (1998 - 2000)	1st	Jim Risch (R)	Bill Sali (R)	Fred Tilman (R)
54th (1998 - 2000)	2nd	Jim Risch (R)	Bill Sali (R)	Fred Tilman (R)
55th (2000 - 2002)	1st	Jim Risch (R)	Bill Sali (R)	Fred Tilman (R)
55th (2000 - 2002)	2nd	Jim Risch (R)	Bill Sali (R)	Fred Tilman (R)

== See also ==
- List of Idaho senators
- List of Idaho representatives
