= Frasure =

Frasure is a surname. Notable people with the surname include:

- Brian Frasure, American paralympic athlete
- Evan Frasure (born 1951), American politician from Idaho
- Jesse Frasure (born 1981), American musician also known as DJ Telemitry
- Robert C. Frasure (1942–1995), American diplomat
