= Mitch Toryanski =

American politician from Idaho

Member of the Idaho Senate from District 18
- In office December 1, 2010 – December 1, 2012
- Preceded by: Kate Kelly
- Succeeded by: Branden Durst

Personal details
- Born: May 1, 1958 (age 68) St. Paul, Minnesota
- Party: Republican
- Spouse: Kim
- Profession: Attorney

Mitch Toryanski (born May 1, 1958) was a Republican member of the Idaho Senate representing District 18 from 2010 to 2012. Toryanski is married to Kim Wherry Toryanski and is a father to three children.

== Early life and career ==
Toryanski is an alumnus of the United States Military Academy, the United States Army War College and The American University. He also studied Russian at the Defense Language Institute.

Toryanski served in the United States Army from 1976 to 1992, the United States Army Reserve from 1992 to 1996, and the Idaho Army National Guard from 1996 to 2010 retiring at the rank of colonel.

As a lawyer he has worked in private practice and served as an Idaho deputy Attorney General (2005–2010) and as a deputy Ada County prosecutor.

From 2017 to 2020, Toryanski served as Regence's Director of Government and Regulatory Affairs.

== Elections ==
=== 2010 ===
Idaho Senate seat vacated by Kate Kelly.

Toryanski defeated Robert N. Lauritsen and Dean E. Sorensen with 46.6% of the vote in the Republican Primary.

Toryanski defeated Democratic state representative Branden Durst in the general election by 103 votes.

=== 2012 ===
Toryanski was unopposed in the Republican Primary.

Toryanski lost to Branden Durst in the general election earning 46.5% of the vote.

=== 2014 ===
In December 2013, Toryanski announced his campaign to run for Idaho Secretary of State.

He, Phil McGrane, and Evan Frasure lost to Lawerence Denney in the Republican primary, with Toryanski getting 15.7% of the vote.

== Committees ==
Toryanski was a member of the following committees:

- Joint Finance and Appropriations
- Finance
- Education

== Organizations ==
He is a member of:

- Veterans of Foreign Wars
- American Legion
- Professional Conduct Board of the Idaho State Bar Association
- Ada County Lincoln Day Association (Past President 2006)
