= Branden Durst =

American politician from Idaho

Member of the Idaho Senate from the 18th district
- In office December 1, 2012 – December 1, 2013
- Preceded by: Mitch Toryanski
- Succeeded by: Janie Ward-Engelking

Member of the Idaho House of Representatives from the 18A district
- In office December 1, 2006 – December 1, 2010
- Preceded by: Debbie Field
- Succeeded by: Julie Ellsworth

Personal details
- Born: January 15, 1980 (age 46) Boise, Idaho, U.S.
- Party: Democratic (Before 2016); Republican (2016–present)
- Education: Pacific Lutheran University (BA); Kent State University; Claremont Graduate University; Boise State University (MPA, EdS)
- Website: Campaign website

Branden John Durst (born January 15, 1980) is a former politician from Boise, Idaho. Durst represented Idaho's 18th Legislative District in the Idaho House of Representative from 2006 to 2010, and in the Idaho Senate from 2012 to 2013. He was the youngest member of the Idaho Senate. Durst switched parties in 2016 and registered as a Republican as of November 2020. Durst announced in January 2021 that he would be a Republican candidate for Idaho State Superintendent of Public Instruction. He ultimately placed second in the primary, earning about 34% of the vote (around 90,000 votes).

== Personal life ==
Durst was born in Boise, Idaho in 1980. He grew up in south Ada County and attended public schools and was a third generation graduate of Boise High School.

Durst attended Pacific Lutheran University (PLU) as undergraduate where he earned a bachelor of arts degree in political science and a minor in communication.

After graduating from PLU, Durst attended graduate school at Kent State University and Claremont Graduate University where he studied public policy analysis and international political economy, respectively. He returned to Boise, and subsequently enrolled at Boise State University (BSU) where he earned a Master of Public Administration degree. While enrolled at BSU, Durst earned an academic scholarship from the Department of Public Policy and Administration and a research assistantship from the Department of Economics. In May 2022, Durst earned an Education Specialist (EdS) degree in Executive Educational Leadership, also from BSU.

Durst is married to his wife, Cheri and has four sons and a daughter.

== Idaho Legislature ==
In the Idaho Senate, Durst served as a member of the following committees:

- Agricultural Affairs
- Commerce and Human Resources
- Education

Durst was also a member of the joint Economic Outlook and Revenue Assessment Committee (EORAC).

As a member of the Idaho House of Representatives, Durst wrote the first law creating the Advanced Opportunities program along with legislative colleague Steven Thayn. Durst and Thayn wrote additional legislation expanding the program further while members of the state senate.

On November 20, 2013, Durst submitted his resignation from the Idaho Senate effective December 1, 2013, to Gov. Butch Otter. It was alleged by the press, but never verified, that Durst was splitting his time between Boise and the Seattle area, where his family had relocated. He was succeeded by Janie Ward-Engelking.

== Elections ==
District 18 House Seat A - Ada County
Year	Candidate	Votes	Pct	Candidate	Votes	Pct	Candidate	Votes	Pct
2006 Primary	Branden Durst	911	100%						
2006 General	Branden Durst	6,664	48.6%	Debbie Field (incumbent)	6,489	47.4	James Oyler	550	4.0%
2008 Primary	Branden Durst (incumbent)	1,283	100%						
2008 General	Branden Durst (incumbent)	9,653	51.1%	Julie Ellsworth	9,222	48.9%			

District 18 Senate - Ada County
Year	Candidate	Votes	Pct	Candidate	Votes	Pct	Candidate	Votes	Pct
2010 Primary	Branden Durst	745	100%						
2010 General	Branden Durst	6,352	49.6%	Mitch Toryanski	6,455	50.4%			
2012 Primary	Branden Durst	1,078	77.1%	Matthew Duncan	321	22.9%			
2012 General	Branden Durst	11,292	53.5%	Mitch Toryanski (incumbent)	9,796	46.5%			

District 29, Position 1 - Pierce County in Washington
Year	Candidate	Votes	Pct	Candidate	Votes	Pct	Candidate	Votes	Pct
2016 Primary	Branden Durst	3,614	23.7%	David Sawyer (incumbent)	6,252	41%	Rick Thomas	5,381	35.29%

2018 Boise School District Trustee (Vote for Three)
Candidate	Votes	Pct
Branden Durst	567	4.9%
Alicia Estey	3,519	30.41%
Shari Fernandez	810	7.0%
Maria Greeley (incumbent)	3,252	28.10%
Troy Rohn (incumbent)	3,124	27.0%
James Tooman	300	2.59%

2022 Idaho Republican Primary for Superintendent of Public Instruction
Candidate	Votes	Pct
Debbie Critchfield	104,592	39.61%
Branden Durst	89,288	33.81%
Sherri Ybarra	70,184	26.58%

Durst was a candidate for Idaho Republican Party 1st Vice Chair at the June 2026 Convention, he was defeated by Viki Purdy only receiving 91 votes.
