= Phylis King =

American politician from Idaho

Phylis K. King

Member of the Idaho House of Representatives from District 18 Position B
- In office December 1, 2006 – December 1, 2018
- Preceded by: Julie Ellsworth
- Succeeded by: Brooke Green

Personal details
- Born: May 8, 1946 (age 80) Ogden, Utah
- Party: Democratic
- Education: Colorado State University
- Profession: Commercial photographer
- Website: king4idaho.com

Phylis K. King (born May 8, 1946, in Ogden, Utah) is a Democratic Idaho State Representative since 2006 representing District 18 Seat B.

== Education ==
King graduated from Grand Junction High School and earned her bachelor's degree in microbiology from Colorado State University.

== Elections ==
On September 6, 2017, King announced that she will retire after the 2018 session of the Idaho Legislature. Earlier that year, she encouraged Tommy Ahlquist to run as a Democrat for governor in a public letter.

=== 2016 ===
King was unopposed for both the Democratic primary and the general election.

=== 2014 ===
Unopposed for the Democratic primary. King defeated Domenico Gelsomino with 63.8% of the vote.

=== 2012 ===
Unopposed for the Democratic primary. King defeated Brad R. Bolicek with 56.2% of the vote.

=== 2010 ===
Unopposed for the Democratic primary. King won the general election with 6,886 votes (53.8%) against Trevor Grigg (R).

=== 2008 ===
Unopposed for the Democratic primary. King won the three-part general election with 9,564 votes (50.9%) against Republican nominee Becky Young and Libertarian nominee James Oyler.

=== 2006 ===
Unopposed for the Democratic primary, King won with 940 votes. King won the general election with 7,240 votes (52.53%) against Julie Ellsworth. Ellsworth later returned to the Idaho House of Representatives in the District 18 A seat, with the two serving together.

=== 2004 ===
King won the May 25, 2004, Democratic primary with 493 votes (53.82%) against Cara Walker. Turnout increased by over 4,000 but King lost to Ellsworth in the November 2, 2004, general election.

=== 2002 ===
Unopposed for the Democratic primary. King lost the general election to incumbent Republican Representative Julie Ellsworth.
