= Mary Souza =

American politician

Member of the Idaho Senate from District 4
- In office December 1, 2014 – November 30, 2022
- Preceded by: John Goedde
- Succeeded by: Ben Toews

Personal details
- Party: Republican
- Spouse: Rick
- Children: 4
- Education: Pacific Lutheran University
- Occupation: Nurse

Mary Souza is an American politician, small business owner, and former nurse who was a Republican member of the Idaho Senate. She was first elected in 2014 to 2022.

In 2015, she co-sponsored a bill that would allow parents to withdraw their children from any activity that "impairs the parents’ firmly held beliefs, values or principles."

In December 2020, Souza signed on to an Amicus Brief in support of Texas' attempts to overturn the results of the presidential election in Georgia, Michigan, Pennsylvania, and Wisconsin (Texas v. Pennsylvania).

== Political positions ==
Souza was the Senate Sponsor of the Fairness in Women's Sports Act which prohibits trans women from competing in women's sports. This bill was the first enacted legislation of its kind in the US and became the model for other states.

In response to the 2020 Zuckerbucks infusion of money into elections, Souza sponsored legislation that prevents outside private groups from funding public elections.

Souza was successful in changing the date of school board trustee elections from the low voter turnout May election to the November election in odd years. This has shown to increase interest in these important races.

Since Souza's retirement from the Idaho Senate, she has written numerous OpEds published in several Idaho newspapers. Her series, "The IFF Files" gives a clear picture of the problems and inconsistencies in the Idaho Freedom Foundation. Recently, she has shed light on the racist and misogynist Groyper movement calling out local transplant political personalities, David J Reilly and Vincent James Foxx and America First PAC founder, Nick Fuentes.

In the 2022 elections, Souza ran for Secretary of State of Idaho. Souza believed there were problems with the 2020 Presidential Election due to ballot harvesting and unconstitutional changes in election law. Souza lost the three way race to Phil McGrane.

== Personal life ==
Souza and her husband, Rick, have four children and six grandchildren. They reside in Coeur d'Alene, Idaho.

== Electoral history ==
District 4 Senate - Part of Kootenai County
Year	Candidate	Votes	Pct	Candidate	Votes	Pct
2014 Primary	Mary Souza	1,853	53.9%	John Goedde (incumbent)	1,587	46.1%
2014 General	Mary Souza	7,406	74.6%	Ray Writz	2,520	25.4%
2016 Primary	Mary Souza (incumbent)	3,198	100%			
2016 General	Mary Souza (incumbent)	13,233	62.9%	Kristi Milan	7,793	37.1%

Idaho Secretary of State Republican primary election, 2022
Party	Candidate	Votes	%
Republican	Phil McGrane	113,894	43.0%
Republican	Dorothy Moon	109,690	41.5%
Republican	Mary Souza	41,057	15.5%

Souza is challenging Dorothy Moon for Idaho Republican Party Chair at the 2024 Summer Convention.
