= Evan Frasure =

American politician

Member of the Idaho Senate
- In office December 1, 1990 – November 30, 2002

Personal details
- Born: March 20, 1951 (age 75)
- Party: Republican

Evan S. Frasure (born March 20, 1951) is an American politician from Idaho. He served in the Idaho House of Representatives and Idaho Senate.

Frasure is from Pocatello, Idaho. He graduated from Idaho State University in 1977.

Frasure served in the Idaho Legislature for 12 years. He did not run for reelection in 2002 to run for secretary of state of Idaho, but he lost to Ben Ysursa. He became a history teacher at Century High School in Pocatello. Frasure ran for secretary of state in the 2014 elections, facing Lawerence Denney, Phil McGrane, and Mitch Toryanski in the Republican primary election. Frasure lost the race to Denney.

Frasure defeated Steve Hadley in the 2016 election for the county commission for Bannock County, Idaho. He was sworn into office on January 9, 2017. He resigned in November 2017 when he was appointed state director of the Farm Service Agency in the United States Department of Agriculture.

== Electoral history ==
Idaho Secretary of State Republican primary election, 2014
Party	Candidate	Votes	%
Republican	Lawerence Denney	51,041	37.1%
Republican	Phil McGrane	38,336	27.9%
Republican	Evan Frasure	26,539	19.3%
Republican	Mitch Toryanski	21,630	15.7%
