= Phil McGrane =

American politician

28th Secretary of State of Idaho
- Incumbent
- Assumed office January 2, 2023
- Governor: Brad Little
- Preceded by: Lawerence Denney

Personal details
- Born: Pocatello, Idaho, U.S.
- Party: Republican
- Spouse: Angella
- Children: 3
- Education: University of Washington (BA); University of Denver (JD); Boise State University (MPA)

Philip McGrane is an American politician from Idaho who is serving as the Secretary of State of Idaho. He previously served as the county clerk for Ada County, Idaho. He is a member of the Republican Party.

McGrane is a moderate Republican. He was first elected in 2022 after winning the Republican nomination with 43% of the vote, defeating state legislators Dorothy Moon and Mary Souza in a crowded primary.

== Early life ==
McGrane is from Boise, Idaho. He earned a bachelor's degree in philosophy from the University of Washington. After graduating, he worked in philanthropy, including with Habitat for Humanity in Alabama. He returned to Boise in 2005 and began working for the Ada County elections office.

McGrane attended the University of Denver's Sturm College of Law and worked as a law clerk for the Election Assistance Commission, an independent federal government agency, in 2010. After he graduated from law school, he became chief deputy clerk for Ada County. McGrane also earned a Master of Public Administration from Boise State University.

== Political career ==
McGrane ran for secretary of state of Idaho in the 2014 elections, finishing in second place in the Republican primary election to Lawerence Denney, and ahead of state legislators Evan Frasure and Mitch Toryanski. McGrane ran for county clerk in the 2018 election, and won.

In June 2021, McGrane announced his candidacy for secretary of state in the 2022 elections. He faced state representative Dorothy Moon and state senator Mary Souza in the primary election. While Moon and Souza both endorsed Donald Trump's false allegations of voter fraud in the 2020 United States presidential election, McGrane acknowledged that Joe Biden was the rightful winner. McGrane defeated Moon and Souza in the primary election, receiving 43 percent of the vote, while Moon received 41 percent and Souza received 16 percent. McGrane faced the Democratic Party nominee, Shawn Keenan, a state committeeman for the Kootenai County Democrats, in the November general election. McGrane received 72% of the vote, while Keenan received 28%.

McGrane is running for reelection in the 2026 election.

== Personal life ==
McGrane and his wife, Angella, live in Hidden Springs, Idaho, and have three children. McGrane is a fan of Kansas City-style barbecue. As a pitmaster, McGrane competes in barbecue competitions with his father-in-law, Lou Johnson, with "Phil & Lou BBQ". In 2016, McGrane was inspired by his love of barbecue to introduce mobile voting inspired by food trucks to increase early voting.

== Electoral history ==
Idaho Secretary of State Republican primary election, 2014
Party	Candidate	Votes	%
Republican	Lawerence Denney	51,041	37.1%
Republican	Phil McGrane	38,336	27.9%
Republican	Evan Frasure	26,539	19.3%
Republican	Mitch Toryanski	21,630	15.7%

Idaho Secretary of State Republican primary election, 2022
Party	Candidate	Votes	%
Republican	Phil McGrane	113,894	43.0%
Republican	Dorothy Moon	109,690	41.5%
Republican	Mary Souza	41,057	15.5%

Political offices
Preceded by Lawerence Denney	Secretary of State of Idaho; 2023–present	Incumbent
