= Janie Ward-Engelking =

American politician from Idaho

Member of the Idaho Senate from the 18th district
- Incumbent
- Assumed office December 20, 2013
- Preceded by: Branden Durst

Member of the Idaho House of Representatives from the 18th district Seat A
- In office December 1, 2012 – December 20, 2013
- Preceded by: Julie Ellsworth
- Succeeded by: Ilana Rubel

Personal details
- Born: Caldwell, Idaho, U.S.
- Party: Democratic
- Education: Idaho State University (BA); Boise State University (MA)
- Website: ward-engelking.com

Janie Ward-Engelking (born in Caldwell, Idaho) is an American politician serving as a Democratic member of the Idaho Senate, representing District 18 since December 2013. She previously represented District 18 Seat A in the Idaho House of Representatives.

== Education ==
After attending Whittier College, Ward-Engelking earned her Bachelor of Arts degree from Idaho State University and her Master of Arts from Boise State University.

== Elections ==
District 18 House Seat A - Part of Ada County
Year	Candidate	Votes	Pct	Candidate	Votes	Pct
2010 Primary	Janie Ward-Engelking	735	100%			
2010 General	Janie Ward-Engelking	6,421	49.9%	Julie Ellsworth	6,428	50.1%
2012 Primary	Janie Ward-Engelking	1,357	100%			
2012 General	Janie Ward-Engelking	11,693	55.3%	Julie Ellsworth (incumbent)	9,434	44.7%

In November 2013 Ward-Engelking expressed interest in being appointed to the Idaho Senate to succeed Durst, who resigned. On December 20, 2013, Gov. Butch Otter appointed her to the Idaho Senate to finish Durst's term.

District 18 Senate - Part of Ada County
Year	Candidate	Votes	Pct	Candidate	Votes	Pct
2014 Primary	Janie Ward-Engelking (incumbent)	1,065	100%			
2014 General	Janie Ward-Engelking (incumbent)	10,556	66.1%	Edward Dindinger	5,406	33.9%
2016 Primary	Janie Ward-Engelking (incumbent)	1,522	100%			
2016 General	Janie Ward-Engelking (incumbent)	16,833	100%			
