= Lawerence Denney =

American politician

27th Secretary of State of Idaho
- In office January 5, 2015 – January 2, 2023
- Governor: Butch Otter; Brad Little
- Preceded by: Ben Ysursa
- Succeeded by: Phil McGrane

40th Speaker of the Idaho House of Representatives
- In office 2006–2012
- Preceded by: Bruce Newcomb
- Succeeded by: Scott Bedke

Majority Leader of the Idaho House of Representatives
- In office 2002–2006
- Preceded by: Frank Bruneel
- Succeeded by: Mike Moyle

Member of the Idaho House of Representatives
- In office December 1, 1996 – November 30, 2014
- Preceded by: Gertrude Sutton
- Succeeded by: Ryan Kerby
- Constituency: 9th district, Seat A (1996–2014)
- In office December 1, 1990 – November 30, 1992
- Succeeded by: Pam Ahrens (redistricting)
- Constituency: 13th district (1990–1992)

Personal details
- Born: February 25, 1948 (age 78) Council, Idaho, U.S.
- Party: Republican
- Education: University of Idaho (BA)
- Website: Campaign website

Lawerence Denney (born February 25, 1948) is an American politician from Idaho who served eight years as the state's secretary of state. A Republican, Denney previously served eighteen years in the Idaho House of Representatives, which included three terms as speaker.

== Political career ==
In 2006, Denney was elected speaker. He was reelected twice. He was defeated in his reelection bid for speaker in 2012 by fellow Republican Scott Bedke.

In the 2014 Idaho elections, Denney ran for the Republican nomination to succeed Ben Ysursa as secretary of state. He defeated former state senator Evan Frasure, Ada County chief deputy clerk Phil McGrane, and former state senator Mitch Toryanski in the primary election. Denney defeated Democratic state representative Holli Woodings in the general election.

On April 19, 2017, Denney announced he was running for re-election in 2018, but did not seek a third term in 2022.

== Personal ==
Denney has a bachelor's degree from the University of Idaho, and has been a farmer since 1972.

== Electoral history ==
Idaho House of Representatives District 13A Republican primary election, 1990
Party	Candidate	Votes	%
Republican	Lawerence Denney	9,494	51.62
Republican	Shirley Taylor	8,899	48.38

Idaho House of Representatives District 13A election, 1990
Party	Candidate	Votes	%
Republican	Lawerence Denney	25,828	59.54
Democratic	Everett Grimes	17,554	40.46

Idaho House of Representatives District 9A Republican primary election, 1996
Party	Candidate	Votes	%
Republican	Lawerence Denney	1,472	48.00
Republican	Arthur Correia	777	25.00
Republican	Lynn Isaacson	418	14.00
Republican	Elaine Pollock	399	13.00

Idaho House of Representatives District 9A election, 1996
Party	Candidate	Votes	%
Republican	Lawerence Denney	7,794	62.80
Democratic	Vonnie Paul	4,618	37.20

Idaho House of Representatives District 9A Republican primary election, 1998
Party	Candidate	Votes	%
Republican	Lawerence Denney (inc.)	3,349	66.00
Republican	Donna Allen	1,727	34.00

Idaho House of Representatives District 9A election, 1998
Party	Candidate	Votes	%
Republican	Lawerence Denney (inc.)	8,423	100.00

Idaho House of Representatives District 9A election, 2000
Party	Candidate	Votes	%
Republican	Lawerence Denney (inc.)	9,450	100.00

Idaho House of Representatives District 9A election, 2002
Party	Candidate	Votes	%
Republican	Lawerence Denney (inc.)	6,449	62.00
Democratic	Lori Ann Steiniker	3,952	38.00

Idaho House of Representatives District 9A election, 2004
Party	Candidate	Votes	%
Republican	Lawerence Denney (inc.)	11,541	100.00

Idaho House of Representatives District 9A election, 2006
Party	Candidate	Votes	%
Republican	Lawerence Denney (inc.)	9,189	100.00

Idaho House of Representatives District 9A election, 2008
Party	Candidate	Votes	%
Republican	Lawerence Denney (inc.)	10,968	71.90
Democratic	Frederick "Fritz" Hallberg	4,286	28.10

Idaho House of Representatives District 9A election, 2010
Party	Candidate	Votes	%
Republican	Lawerence Denney (inc.)	8,736	76.70
Democratic	Lynn Webster	2,660	23.30

Idaho House of Representatives District 9A election, 2012
Party	Candidate	Votes	%
Republican	Lawerence Denney (inc.)	12,234	70.90
Democratic	Steve Worthley	5,013	29.10

Idaho Secretary of State Republican primary election, 2014
Party	Candidate	Votes	%
Republican	Lawerence Denney	51,041	37.10
Republican	Phil McGrane	38,336	27.90
Republican	Evan Frasure	26,539	19.30
Republican	Mitch Toryanski	21,630	15.70

Idaho Secretary of State election, 2014
Party	Candidate	Votes	%
Republican	Lawerence Denney	241,851	56.20
Democratic	Holli Woodings	188,353	43.80

== Sources ==
- Lawerence Denney's campaign website
- Lawerence Denney at the Idaho House of Representatives

Idaho House of Representatives
Preceded by Frank Bruneel	Majority Leader of the Idaho House of Representatives; 2002–2006	Succeeded by Mike Moyle
Political offices
Preceded by Bruce Newcomb	Speaker of the Idaho House of Representatives; 2006–2012	Succeeded by Scott Bedke
Preceded by Ben Ysursa	Secretary of State of Idaho; 2015–2023	Succeeded by Phil McGrane
