= Avimor, Idaho =

- Census-designated place
- Location within Idaho Location within the United States
- Coordinates: 43°46′23″N 116°15′20″W
- Country: United States
- State: Idaho
- County: Ada

Area
  - Total: 1.36 sq mi (3.53 km^{2})
  - Land: 1.36 sq mi (3.53 km^{2})
  - Water: 0 sq mi (0.0 km^{2})
- Elevation: 3,220 ft (980 m)

Population (2020)
  - Total: 1,255
  - Density: 921/sq mi (356/km^{2})
- Time zone: UTC-7 (Mountain (MST))
  - Summer (DST): UTC-6 (MDT)
- ZIP Code: 83714 (Garden City)
- Area codes: 208, 986
- FIPS code: 16-04105
- GNIS feature ID: 2806607

Avimor is a census-designated place (CDP) in Ada County, Idaho, United States. It is on the northern edge of the county, bordered to the northeast by Boise County and to the west by Idaho State Highway 55. The Spring Valley is in the western part of the CDP. The community is 8 miles (13 km) northeast of Eagle and 15 miles (24 km) north of Boise, the state capital.

Avimor is a master-planned community located in the Boise Foothills, offering a blend of residential homes, parks, over 100 miles of trails, and 13 community parks. It features a community center, athletic fields, a K-12 academy, various amenities, and a focus on social interaction and outdoor activities. The Village Center contains 175,000 sq ft of mixed-use commercial development, including retail shops, office space, and the 12,000 sq ft Community Center.

== Demographics ==
=== 2020 census ===
As of the 2020 census, Avimor had a population of 1,255. Avimor was first listed as a CDP prior to the 2020 census. The median age was 51.2 years. 18.5% of residents were under the age of 18, and 25.5% of residents were 65 years of age or older. For every 100 females there were 90.4 males, and for every 100 females age 18 and over there were 90.9 males age 18 and over.

0.0% of residents lived in urban areas, while 100.0% lived in rural areas.

There were 488 households in Avimor, of which 25.8% had children under the age of 18 living in them. Of all households, 76.8% were married-couple households, 6.6% were households with a male householder and no spouse or partner present, and 12.5% were households with a female householder and no spouse or partner present. About 12.1% of all households were made up of individuals, and 5.7% had someone living alone who was 65 years of age or older.

There were 507 housing units, of which 3.7% were vacant. The homeowner vacancy rate was 0.0,% and the rental vacancy rate was 15.8%.

Racial composition as of the 2020 census
Race	Number	Percent
White	1,104	88.0%
Black or African American	4	0.3%
American Indian and Alaska Native	5	0.4%
Asian	12	1.0%
Native Hawaiian and Other Pacific Islander	0	0.0%
Some other race	19	1.5%
Two or more races	111	8.8%
Hispanic or Latino (of any race)	97	7.7%
