= Julie Ellsworth =

American politician from Idaho

Treasurer of Idaho
- Incumbent
- Assumed office January 7, 2019
- Governor: Brad Little
- Preceded by: Ron Crane

Member of the Idaho House of Representatives
- In office December 1, 2010 – December 1, 2012
- Preceded by: Branden Durst
- Succeeded by: Janie Ward-Engelking
- Constituency: District 18A
- In office December 1, 2002 – December 1, 2006
- Preceded by: Fred Tilman
- Succeeded by: Phylis King
- Constituency: District 18B
- In office December 1, 1996 – December 1, 2002
- Preceded by: Dave Baumann
- Succeeded by: Bill Deal
- Constituency: District 13B

Personal details
- Born: December 8, 1961 (age 64) Utah, U.S.
- Party: Republican
- Education: Brigham Young University (BA)
- Website: Campaign website

Julie A. Ellsworth (born December 8, 1961) is an American politician from Idaho. She has been the treasurer of Idaho since 2019.

Ellsworth also was a Republican Idaho State Representative representing District 18 in the A seat from 2010 to 2012. Ellsworth has previously served in the Idaho House of Representatives from 1997 until 2006, three terms in Seat 13B and two terms in seat 18B.

== Education ==
Ellsworth earned her bachelor's degree in education from Brigham Young University.

== Elections ==
=== Idaho Treasurer ===
==== 2018 ====
Ellsworth defeated Tom Kealey and Vicky McIntyre with 36.8% of the vote. Ellsworth was unopposed in the general election.

=== Idaho House of Representatives ===
==== 2012 ====
Ellsworth was unopposed in the Republican primary.

In a general election rematch against Ward-Engelking, Ellsworth was defeated earning only 44.7% of the vote.

==== 2010 ====
With Durst seeking the open senate seat, Ellsworth again ran for seat A, winning the Republican primary with 2,024 votes (64.5%) against Greg Ferch.

In her closest race, Ellsworth won the November 2, 2010, general election by just 9 votes with 6,429 votes (50.0%) against Janie Ward-Engelking (D).

==== 2008 ====
Rather than seeking another contest with King, Ellsworth chose to run for seat A in the Republican primary and won with 1,544 votes (60.5%) against Gail Hartnett.

Ellsworth lost the general election to incumbent Democratic Representative Branden Durst by 431 votes.

==== 2006 ====
Unopposed for the Republican primary

In their third contest, Phylis King defeated Ellsworth in the general election by nearly 700 votes.

==== 2004 ====
Unopposed for the Republican primary.

Ellsworth won the general election with 9,751 votes (51.9%) defeating Phylis King for a second time.

==== 2002 ====
Redistricted to District 18, Ellsworth won the three-way May 28, 2002, Republican primary with 2,552 votes (65.4%) against Cheryl A. Miller and Michael Law.

She won the general election with 7,178 votes (55.8%) against Phylis King.

==== 2000 ====
Unopposed for the May 23, 2000, Republican primary.

She won the general election with 8,936 votes (56.6%) against George M. Klein (D).

==== 1998 ====
Unopposed for the Republican primary.

She won the general election with 7,026 (55.9%) against Selina Shaw (D).

==== 1996 ====
Ellsworth defeated incumbent Republican Representative Dave Baumann in the primary with 1,483 votes (51%), winning by 61 votes.

She won the general election with 8,427 votes (50.9%) against Kathleen Roos (D.)

Political offices
Preceded by Ron Crane	Treasurer of Idaho; 2019–present	Incumbent
