= Scott Bedke =

American politician (born 1958)

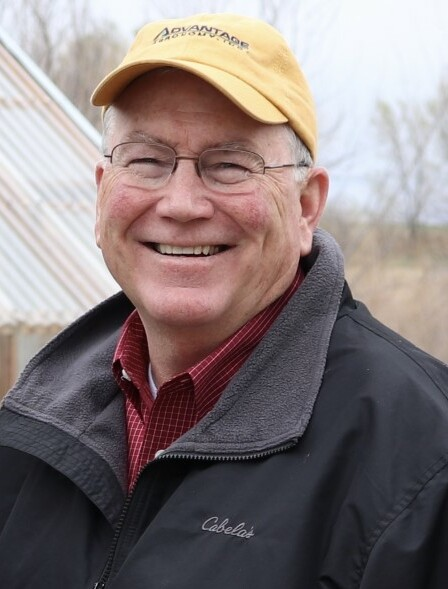

44th Lieutenant Governor of Idaho
- Incumbent
- Assumed office January 2, 2023
- Governor: Brad Little
- Preceded by: Janice McGeachin

41st Speaker of the Idaho House of Representatives
- In office December 5, 2012 – November 30, 2022
- Preceded by: Lawerence Denney
- Succeeded by: Mike Moyle

President of the National Conference of State Legislatures
- In office 2022–2023 Serving with Robin Vos
- Preceded by: Scott Saiki
- Succeeded by: Brian Patrick Kennedy

Member of the Idaho House of Representatives
- In office January 3, 2001 – November 30, 2022
- Preceded by: Jim Kempton
- Succeeded by: Douglas Pickett
- Constituency: 25th district Seat A (2001–2002); 27th district Seat A (2002–2022)

Personal details
- Born: April 27, 1958 (age 67) Twin Falls, Idaho, U.S.
- Party: Republican
- Spouse: Sarah
- Education: Brigham Young University (BS)
- Website: Campaign website

Scott Conrad Bedke (born April 27, 1958) is an American politician serving as the 44th lieutenant governor of Idaho since 2023. A Republican, he served as a member of the Idaho House of Representatives for the 27A district. In December 2012, Bedke defeated fellow Republican Lawerence Denney to become speaker of the Idaho House of Representatives.

== Early life and education ==
Bedke was born in Twin Falls, Idaho. He graduated from Oakley High School and from Brigham Young University with a Bachelor of Science in finance. He served a mission for the Church of Jesus Christ of Latter-day Saints in Italy from 1977 to 1979.

== Career ==
When long-time legislator Jim Kempton resigned his seat for an appointment to the Northwest Power and Conservation Council, Legislative District 25 Central Committee met to fill the vacancy in House Seat A, sending three names in order of preference to Governor Dirk Kempthorne: Bedke, Garry Turner of Burley, and ODeen Redman of Albion. Governor Kempthore appointed Bedke to serve the remainder of Kempton's term.

After redistricting in 2002, Bedke was challenged in the Republican primary by Tim Willie and in the general election by Dan Ralphs, both of whom he defeated. Bedke was challenged in the 2004 Republican primary by Wayne Bagwell, whom he also defeated, and ran unopposed in every election since.

From 2022–23, he served as president of the National Conference of State Legislatures alongside Robin Vos.

=== Committees ===
Prior to being elected as speaker in 2012, Bedke served on the following House Committees:

- Joint Finance & Appropriations Committee
- Revenue & Taxation Committee
- Resources & Conservation Committee
- Transportation & Defense Committee
- Chair Economic Outlook & Revenue Assessment Committee
- Credit Rating Enhancement Committee

=== 2022 lieutenant governor campaign ===
On May 17, 2022, Bedke won the Republican nomination in the statewide primary for the 2022 Idaho lieutenant gubernatorial election. He defeated Priscilla Giddings and Daniel Gasiorowski in the primary election and then defeated Democrat Terri Pickens Manweiler in the general election on November 8, 2022.

== Elections ==
District 27 House Seat A - Cassia, Oneida, and Power Counties and part of Bingham County
Year	Candidate	Votes	Pct	Candidate	Votes	Pct
2002 Primary	Scott Bedke (incumbent)	3,804	73.2%	Tim Willie	3,804	26.8%
2002 General	Scott Bedke (incumbent)	6,768	65.8%	Dan Ralphs	3,521	34.2%
2004 Primary	Scott Bedke (incumbent)	3,188	67.36%	Wayne Bagwell	1,545	32.64%
2004 General	Scott Bedke (incumbent)	11,215	100%	Unopposed	0	0.00%
2006 Primary	Scott Bedke (incumbent)	4,528	100%	Unopposed	0	0.00%
2006 General	Scott Bedke (incumbent)	8,801	100%	Unopposed	0	0.00%
2008 Primary	Scott Bedke (incumbent)	4,393	100%	Unopposed	0	0.00%
2008 General	Scott Bedke (incumbent)	11,736	100%	Unopposed	0	0.00%
2010 Primary	Scott Bedke (incumbent)	5,363	100%	Unopposed	0	0.00%
2010 General	Scott Bedke (incumbent)	8,801	100%	Unopposed	0	0.00%

District 27 House Seat A - Cassia and Minidoka Counties
Year	Candidate	Votes	Pct	Candidate	Votes	Pct
2012 Primary	Scott Bedke (incumbent)	5,924	100%	Unopposed	0	0.00%
2012 General	Scott Bedke (incumbent)	13,197	100%	Unopposed	0	0.00%
2014 Primary	Scott Bedke (incumbent)	4,964	100%	Unopposed	0	0.00%
2014 General	Scott Bedke (incumbent)	8,748	100%	Unopposed	0	0.00%
2016 Primary	Scott Bedke (incumbent)	4,631	100%	Unopposed	0	0.00%
2016 General	Scott Bedke (incumbent)	13,181	100%	Unopposed	0	0.00%
2018 Primary	Scott Bedke (incumbent)	4,631	100%	Unopposed	0	0.00%
2018 General	Scott Bedke (incumbent)	13,181	100%	Unopposed	0	0.00%
2020 Primary	Scott Bedke (incumbent)	4,631	100%	Unopposed	0	0.00%
2020 General	Scott Bedke (incumbent)	13,181	100%	Unopposed	0	0.00%

2022 Idaho lieutenant gubernatorial election
Year	Candidate	Votes	Pct	Candidate	Votes	Pct
2022 Primary	Scott Bedke	139,573	51.7%	Priscilla Giddings	114,822	42.5%

== Personal life ==
Bedke is married and has four children and sixteen grandchildren. He grew up in Oakley, Idaho.

Political offices
Preceded by Lawerence Denney	Speaker of the Idaho House of Representatives; 2012–2023	Succeeded by Mike Moyle
Preceded by Janice McGeachin	Lieutenant Governor of Idaho; 2023–present	Incumbent
