= Ben Ysursa =

American politician

26th Secretary of State of Idaho
- In office January 6, 2003 – January 5, 2015
- Governor: Dirk Kempthorne; Jim Risch; Butch Otter
- Preceded by: Pete Cenarrusa
- Succeeded by: Lawerence Denney

Personal details
- Born: Boise, Idaho
- Party: Republican
- Education: Gonzaga University (BA); Saint Louis University (JD)
- Profession: Attorney

Benito 'Ben' T. Ysursa is an American attorney and politician who served as the Secretary of State of Idaho from 2003 to 2015. He is a member of the Republican Party.

== Early life and education ==
Ysursa is a native of Boise, Idaho and was born to a Basque American family. His paternal grandparents, Benito Ysursa and Asuncion Camporredondo, were immigrants from the Basque Country. His father, Ramon Ysursa (1920-2015), was active in the Basque American community in Boise.

Ben Ysursa graduated from Bishop Kelly High School in 1967. He earned a bachelor's degree from Gonzaga University in 1971 and a Juris Doctor from the Saint Louis University School of Law in 1974. He is of Basque American descent.

== Career ==
Ysursa was admitted to the Idaho State Bar in 1974. From 1974 to 2003, Ysursa served in the Idaho Secretary of State office under his predecessor, Pete T. Cenarrusa. He held the positions of Deputy Secretary of State (1974–1976) and Chief Deputy Secretary of State (1976–2003).

=== Idaho Secretary of State ===
Ysursa was elected Secretary of State in 2002 with 77.5 percent of the vote. He was reelected unopposed in 2006. Ysursa was elected to a third term in 2010, defeating Democratic nominee Mack Sermon with 74.3 percent of the vote. During his tenure in office, Ysursa was characterized as a moderate Republican.

During the 2014 Idaho gubernatorial election, Ysursa helped incumbent Governor Butch Otter's reelection campaign. Ysursa did not seek reelection in 2014, instead supporting the unsuccessful candidacy of Phil McGrane. Ysursa cited a lack of "fire in the belly" for his decision to not seek another term in office.

Ysursa left office in 2015 and was succeeded by 2014 election victor Lawerence Denney. In 2022, Ysursa actively supported McGrane's successful candidacy for Secretary of State.

=== Later career ===
After leaving office in 2015, Ysursa joined Gallatin Public Affairs in an 'of counsel' position the firm.

Ysursa endorsed Democratic candidate Tom Arkoosh over Republican nominee Raúl Labrador in the 2022 Idaho Attorney General election. He stated that it was the first time he endorsed a Democrat for office, and that he would have supported incumbent Republican Lawrence Wasden had he not lost the primary to Labrador. Ysura stated he was "chagrined by those who espouse the ‘big lie,’” former President Donald Trump’s assertion that he actually defeated current President Joe Biden in the 2020 election".

In April 2022, Ysursa joined the Idaho Statesman editorial board.

== Personal life and recognition ==
Ysursa is married and has three children with his wife, Penny. They also have two grandchildren. He is a fan of the Arizona Cardinals.

== Awards ==
- "Boyd Martin Award" from the Association of Idaho Cities
- Recipient for Outstanding Administrator (1992) from the Idaho Republican Party
- Liberty Bell Award from the Fourth District Bar Association (May 2014)
- Edward and Dottie Stimpson Award for Civic Engagement from the City Club of Boise (December 2014)

=== Service on Committees ===
- Board of Land Commissioners (member)
- Board of Examiners (member)
- Board of Canvassers (chairman)
- Land Board briefing committee (member)
- Board of Examiners sub-committee (member)
- various state and city committees (member)

== Notes ==
Preceded by Pete T. Cenarrusa	Secretary of State of Idaho; January 6, 2003–January 5, 2015	Succeeded by Lawerence Denney
