= Hidden Springs, Idaho =

Census-designated place in Ada County, Idaho, United States

Hidden Springs
- Census-designated place
- Location of Hidden Springs in Ada County, Idaho.

- Location within Idaho
- Coordinates: 43°43′08″N 116°14′53″W
- Country: United States
- State: Idaho
- County: Ada

Area
  - Total: 2.536 sq mi (6.57 km^{2})
  - Land: 2.524 sq mi (6.54 km^{2})
  - Water: 0.012 sq mi (0.031 km^{2})
- Elevation: 2,877 ft (877 m)

Population (2020)
  - Total: 3,076
  - Density: 1,219/sq mi (470.5/km^{2})
- Time zone: UTC-7 (Mountain (MST))
  - Summer (DST): UTC-6 (MDT)
- Area codes: 208, 986
- GNIS feature ID: 2585573

Hidden Springs is a master-planned community in the Dry Creek Valley in Ada County, Idaho, United States, established in 1987. For statistical purposes, the United States Census Bureau has defined the community as a census-designated place (CDP). Its population was 3,076 as of the 2020 census.

== Description ==
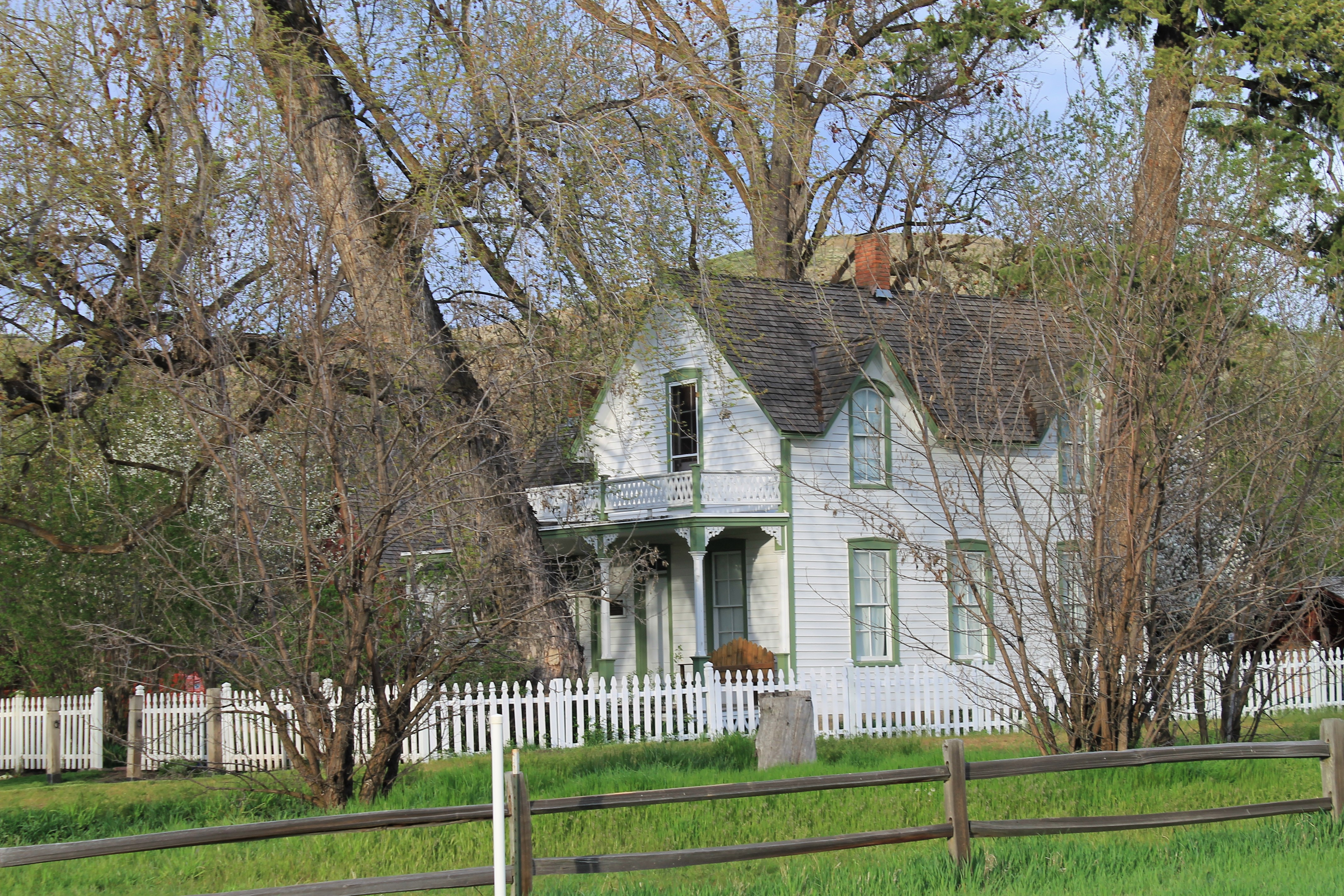
Schick-Ostolasa Homestead in Hidden Springs, April 2020

The community manages more than 800 acres (320 ha) of permanently preserved open space and its own wastewater treatment facility.

Architecture is primarily in a neo-traditional style, with many homes having garages accessible through rear alleys. The result is a neighborhood that is generally more pedestrian-friendly than the typical suburban subdivision.

== Demographics ==
Historical population
Census	Pop.	Note	%±
2010	2,280		—
2020	3,076		34.9%
U.S. Decennial Census

=== 2020 census ===
As of the 2020 census, Hidden Springs had a population of 3,076. The median age was 42.0 years. 30.7% of residents were under the age of 18 and 14.8% of residents were 65 years of age or older. For every 100 females there were 99.5 males, and for every 100 females age 18 and over there were 97.9 males age 18 and over.

0.0% of residents lived in urban areas, while 100.0% lived in rural areas.

There were 1,033 households in Hidden Springs, of which 46.7% had children under the age of 18 living in them. Of all households, 78.6% were married-couple households, 6.9% were households with a male householder and no spouse or partner present, and 10.7% were households with a female householder and no spouse or partner present. About 10.0% of all households were made up of individuals and 4.7% had someone living alone who was 65 years of age or older.

There were 1,073 housing units, of which 3.7% were vacant. The homeowner vacancy rate was 2.2% and the rental vacancy rate was 1.4%.

Racial composition as of the 2020 census
Race	Number	Percent
White	2,706	88.0%
Black or African American	18	0.6%
American Indian and Alaska Native	14	0.5%
Asian	42	1.4%
Native Hawaiian and Other Pacific Islander	2	0.1%
Some other race	28	0.9%
Two or more races	266	8.6%
Hispanic or Latino (of any race)	170	5.5%

== Education ==
The area is in Boise School District. Hidden Springs Elementary School is located within the neighborhood.

In addition to that elementary school, Hidden Springs is zoned to Hillside Junior High School and Boise High School.

== See also ==
- List of census-designated places in Idaho
