= Secretary of State of Idaho =

Constitutional office in Idaho, United States

- Great Seal of the State of Idaho
- Incumbent; Phil McGrane since January 2, 2023
- Style: The Honorable
- Term length: Four years
- Inaugural holder: A. J. Pinkham; 1890
- Website: Official website

The secretary of state of Idaho is one of the constitutional officers of the U.S. state of Idaho. It is an elected position within the executive branch of the state government. The current secretary of state is Phil McGrane.

== Duties of the secretary of state ==
=== Electoral ===
The secretary is responsible for the administration of elections and regulation of lobbying and campaign finance.

=== Economic ===
The secretary's office registers business entities, files liens under the Uniform Commercial Code, and registers trademarks and service marks within the state.

=== Administrative and governmental ===
The secretary is the keeper of the Great Seal of Idaho, and as such is responsible for licensing notaries public, as well as authenticating documents and issuing apostilles. The secretary's office also provides information and publications to the general public, including the Idaho Blue Book, and is also an ex officio member of the Idaho Code Commission. The secretary also administers the Idaho Will Registry, the Idaho Health Care Directive Registry (for such documents as living wills and medical powers of attorney), and the state's Address Confidentiality Program.

== List of secretaries of state of Idaho ==
Party designations: (R) = Republican; (D) = Democrat; (S.R.) = Silver Republican

Territorial government (1863–1890)
| Name | Appointed |
|---|---|
| William B. Daniels | October 3, 1863 |
| C. DeWitt Smith | April 7, 1864 |
| Horace G. Gilson | April 9, 1865 |
| S.R. Howlett | July 26, 1866 |
| Edward J. Curtis | April 5, 1869, reappointed May 2, 1874 |
| Robert A. Sidebotham | April 29, 1878 |
| Theodore F. Singiser | December 22, 1880 |
| Edward L. Curtis | March 3, 1883 |
| D. P. B. Pride | February 7, 1884 |
| Edward J. Curtis | December 2, 1885, reappointed December 2, 1889 |

State government (1890 through present)
| Name/Party | Term of office | Remarks |
|---|---|---|
| A.J. Pinkham (R) | May 1, 1891, to February 1, 1893 | Elected 1890 |
| J.F. Curtis (R) | February 1, 1893, to July 1, 1895 | Elected 1892 |
| Isaac W. Garrett (R) | July 1, 1895, to April 1, 1897 | Elected 1894 |
| George Lewis (P-D) | April 1, 1897, to February 1, 1899 | Elected 1896 |
| M.A. Patrie (R) | February 1, 1899, to July 1, 1901 | Elected 1898 |
| Charles Bassett (S.R.-D) | July 1, 1901, to May 1, 1903 | Elected 1900 |
| Will H. Gibson (R) | May 1, 1903, to July 1, 1907 | Elected 1902; reelected 1904 |
| Robert Lansdon (R) | July 1, 1907, to February 1, 1911 | Elected 1906; reelected 1908 |
| Wilford L. Gifford (R) | February 1, 1911, to April 1, 1915 | Elected 1910; reelected 1912 |
| George R. Barker (R) | April 1, 1915, to January 1, 1917 | Elected 1914 |
| William T. Dougherty (D) | January 1, 1917, to June 1, 1919 | Elected 1916 |
| Robert O. Jones (R) | June 1, 1919, to January 1, 1923 | Elected 1918; reelected 1920 |
| F.A. Jeter (R) | January 1, 1923, to March 1, 1927 | Elected 1922; reelected 1924 |
| Fred E. Lukens (R) | March 1, 1927, to February 1, 1933 | Elected 1926; reelected 1928, 1930 |
| Franklin Girard (D) | February 1, 1933, to March 1, 1937 | Elected 1932; reelected 1934 |
| Ira H. Masters (D) | March 1, 1937, to February 1, 1939 | Elected 1936 |
| George H. Curtis (D) | February 1, 1939, to January 1, 1945 | Elected 1938; reelected 1940, 1942 |
| Ira H. Masters (D) | January 1, 1945, to June 1, 1947 | Elected 1944 |
| J.D. (Cy) Price (R) | June 1, 1947, to January 1, 1951 | Elected 1946 |
| Ira H. Masters (D) | January 1, 1951, to February 19, 1956 | Elected 1950; reelected 1954; died in office |
| James H. Young (R) | February 27, 1956, to May 1, 1959 | Appointed to fill vacancy |
| Arnold Williams (D) | May 1, 1959, to March 29, 1966 | Elected 1958; reelected 1962; resigned March 29, 1966 |
| Louis E. Clapp (D) | March 29, 1966, to February 1, 1967 | Appointed to fill vacancy |
| Edson Deal (R) | February 1, 1967, to April 22, 1967 | Elected 1966; died in office |
| Pete T. Cenarrusa (R) | January 5, 1967, to June 1, 2003 | Appointed to fill vacancy; Elected 1970; reelected 1974, 1978, 1982, 1986, 1990, 1994, 1998 |
| Ben Ysursa (R) | June 1, 2003, to May 1, 2015 | Elected 2002; reelected 2006, 2010 |
| Lawerence Denney (R) | May 1, 2015, to January 2, 2023 | Elected 2014; reelected 2018 |
| Phil McGrane (R) | January 2, 2023 | Elected 2022 |

== See also ==
- List of company registers
