= Ada County, Idaho =

County in Idaho, United States

- County
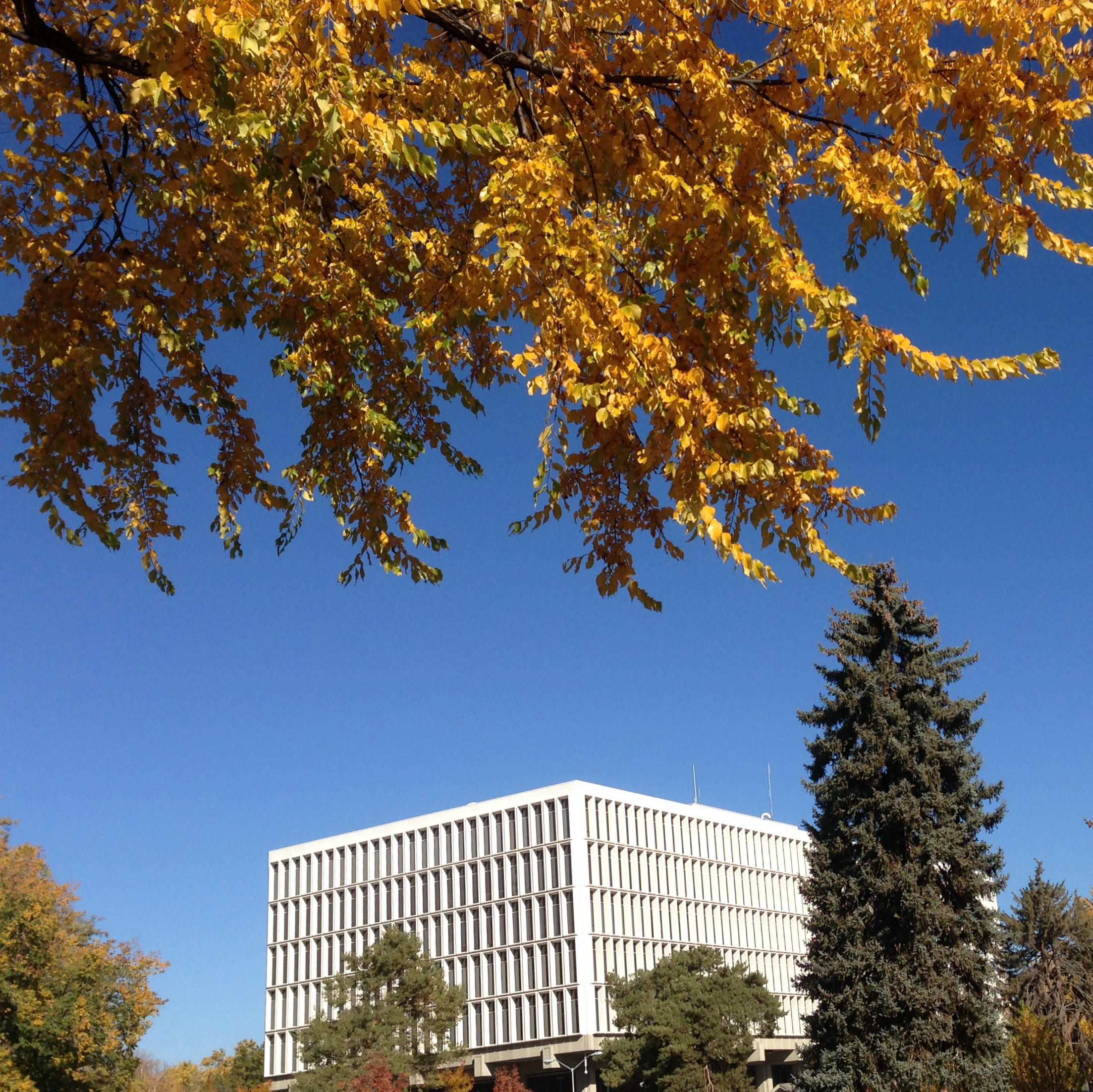
- James A. McClure Federal Building and U.S. Courthouse in Boise, Idaho

- Seal

- Location within the U.S. state of Idaho
- Coordinates: 43°27′N 116°14′W
- Country: United States
- State: Idaho
- Founded: December 22, 1864
- Named for: Ada Riggs
- Seat: Boise
- Largest city: Boise

Area
  - Total: 1,060 sq mi (2,745 km^{2})
  - Land: 1,052 sq mi (2,725 km^{2})
  - Water: 7.7 sq mi (20 km^{2}) 0.7%

Population (2020)
  - Total: 494,967
  - Estimate (2025): ▲546,141
  - Density: 470.4/sq mi (181.6/km^{2})
- Time zone: UTC−7 (Mountain)
  - Summer (DST): UTC−6 (MDT)
- Congressional districts: 1st, 2nd
- Website: adacounty.id.gov
- County Code: 1A

Ada County is located in the southwestern part of Idaho, United States. As of the 2020 census, the county had a population of 494,967, which by 2025 was estimated to have risen to 546,141. Ada County is by far the state's most populous county; it is home to 26.8% of the state's population. The county seat and largest city is Boise, which is also the state capital. Ada County is included in the Boise metropolitan area. The Ada County Highway District has jurisdiction over all the local county and city streets, except for private roads and state roads. In the interior Pacific Northwest east of the Cascade Range, Ada County ranks second in population, behind Spokane County, Washington.

== History ==
Ada County was created by the Idaho Territory legislature on December 22, 1864, partitioned from Boise County. It is named for Ada Riggs, the daughter of H. C. Riggs, a member of the legislature; he established the county and was a co-founder of Boise. Canyon County, which originally included Payette County and most of Gem County, was partitioned from western Ada County in 1891.

== Geography ==
According to the United States Census Bureau, the county has a total area of 1,060 square miles (2,700 km^{2}), of which 1,053 square miles (2,730 km^{2}) is land and 7.9 square miles (20 km^{2}) (0.7%) is water. The Boise River flows through the northern portion of the county, and the northwest border is bounded by the foothills of the Boise Range mountains; the summits are in adjacent Boise County. The southwestern border of the county is bounded by the Snake River.

=== Adjacent counties ===
- Gem County - northwest
- Boise County - northeast
- Elmore County - east
- Owyhee County - south
- Canyon County - west

=== Major highways ===
- - Interstate 84
- - Interstate 184
- - US 20
- - US 26
- - US 30
- - SH-16
- - SH-21 - Ponderosa Pine Scenic Byway
- - SH-44
- - SH-55 - Payette River Scenic Byway
- - SH-69

County roads and highways are maintained by the Ada County Highway District.

=== National protected areas ===
- Boise National Forest (part)
- Snake River Birds of Prey National Conservation Area (part)

== Demographics ==
Historical population
Census	Pop.	Note	%±
1870	2,675		—
1880	4,674		74.7%
1890	8,368		79.0%
1900	11,559		38.1%
1910	29,088		151.6%
1920	35,213		21.1%
1930	37,925		7.7%
1940	50,401		32.9%
1950	70,649		40.2%
1960	93,460		32.3%
1970	112,230		20.1%
1980	173,036		54.2%
1990	205,775		18.9%
2000	300,904		46.2%
2010	392,365		30.4%
2020	494,967		26.1%
2025 (est.)	546,141		10.3%
U.S. Decennial Census; 1790–1960 1900–1990; 1990–2000 2010–2020

=== Racial and ethnic composition ===
Ada County, Idaho – Racial and ethnic composition Note: the US Census treats Hispanic/Latino as an ethnic category. This table excludes Latinos from the racial categories and assigns them to a separate category. Hispanics/Latinos may be of any race.
Race / Ethnicity (NH = Non-Hispanic)	Pop 1980	Pop 1990	Pop 2000	Pop 2010	Pop 2020	% 1980	% 1990	% 2000	% 2010	% 2020
White alone (NH)	165,629	195,120	272,569	339,332	397,998	95.72%	94.82%	90.58%	86.48%	80.41%
Black or African American alone (NH)	677	924	1,829	4,180	7,733	0.39%	0.45%	0.61%	1.07%	1.56%
Native American or Alaska Native alone (NH)	895	1,247	1,856	2,058	2,269	0.52%	0.61%	0.62%	0.52%	0.46%
Asian alone (NH)	1,492	2,829	5,140	9,234	13,651	0.86%	1.37%	1.71%	2.35%	2.76%
Native Hawaiian or Pacific Islander alone (NH)	x	x	418	817	1,219	x	x	0.14%	0.21%	0.25%
Other race alone (NH)	501	99	333	505	2,485	0.29%	0.05%	0.11%	0.13%	0.50%
Mixed race or Multiracial (NH)	x	x	5,292	8,334	24,389	x	x	1.76%	2.12%	4.93%
Hispanic or Latino (any race)	3,842	5,556	13,467	27,905	45,223	2.22%	2.70%	4.48%	7.11%	9.14%
Total	173,036	205,775	300,904	392,365	494,967	100.00%	100.00%	100.00%	100.00%	100.00%

=== 2020 census ===
As of the 2020 census, the county had a population of 494,967. The median age was 37.4 years. 23.5% of residents were under the age of 18 and 15.5% of residents were 65 years of age or older. For every 100 females there were 99.3 males, and for every 100 females age 18 and over there were 97.6 males age 18 and over.

The racial makeup of the county was 82.9% White, 1.6% Black or African American, 0.7% American Indian and Alaska Native, 2.8% Asian, 0.3% Native Hawaiian and Pacific Islander, 3.3% from some other race, and 8.5% from two or more races. Hispanic or Latino residents of any race comprised 9.1% of the population.

94.4% of residents lived in urban areas, while 5.6% lived in rural areas.

There were 187,488 households in the county, of which 31.7% had children under the age of 18 living with them and 23.4% had a female householder with no spouse or partner present. About 24.3% of all households were made up of individuals and 9.4% had someone living alone who was 65 years of age or older.

There were 196,901 housing units, of which 4.8% were vacant. Among occupied housing units, 69.1% were owner-occupied and 30.9% were renter-occupied. The homeowner vacancy rate was 1.1% and the rental vacancy rate was 5.8%.

=== 2010 census ===
As of the 2010 census, there were 392,365 people, 148,445 households, and 99,282 families in the county. The population density was 372.8 inhabitants per square mile (143.9/km^{2}). There were 159,471 housing units at an average density of 151.5 per square mile (58.5/km^{2}). The racial makeup of the county was 90.3% white, 2.4% Asian, 1.1% black or African American, 0.7% American Indian, 0.2% Pacific islander, 2.4% from other races, and 2.8% from two or more races. Those of Hispanic or Latino origin made up 7.1% of the population. In terms of ancestry, 19.4% were German, 15.9% were English, 11.8% were Irish, and 8.6% were American.

Of the 148,445 households, 35.6% had children under the age of 18 living with them, 52.4% were married couples living together, 10.0% had a female householder with no husband present, 33.1% were non-families, and 25.0% of all households were made up of individuals. The average household size was 2.58 and the average family size was 3.11. The median age was 34.8 years.

The median income for a household in the county was $55,835 and the median income for a family was $67,519. Males had a median income of $48,290 versus $34,875 for females. The per capita income for the county was $27,915. About 6.9% of families and 10.2% of the population were below the poverty line, including 11.8% of those under age 18 and 6.8% of those age 65 or over.

=== 2000 census ===
As of the 2000 census, there were 300,904 people, 113,408 households, and 77,344 families in the county. The population density was 285/mi^{2} (110/km^{2}). There were 118,516 housing units at an average density of 112/mi^{2} (43/km^{2}). The racial makeup of the county was 92.86% White, 0.65% Black or African American, 0.69% Native American, 1.74% Asian, 0.15% Pacific Islander, 1.67% from other races, and 2.24% from two or more races. Hispanic or Latino residents of any race were 4.48% of the population.

There were 113,408 households, out of which 36.20% had children under the age of 18 living with them, 55.10% were married couples living together, 9.40% had a female householder with no husband present, and 31.80% were non-families. 23.80% of all households were made up of individuals, and 6.07% had someone living alone who was 65 years of age or older. The average household size was 2.59 and the average family size was 3.11.

The county population contained 27.30% under the age of 18, 10.30% from 18 to 24, 32.50% from 25 to 44, 20.80% from 45 to 64, and 9.10% who were 65 years of age or older. The median age was 33 years. For every 100 females, there were 100.6 males. For every 100 females age 18 and over, there were 98.9 males.

The median income for a household in the county was $46,140, and the median income for a family was $54,416. Males had a median income of $37,867 versus $26,453 for females. The per capita income for the county was $22,519. About 5.40% of families and 7.70% of the population were below the poverty line, including 9.20% of those under age 18 and 5.70% of those age 65 or over.

== Government and politics ==
Ada County has traditionally been rather conservative for an urban county. Like Idaho as a whole, it has long been a Republican Party stronghold. The last victory in a presidential election by a Democrat in Ada County was by Franklin D. Roosevelt in 1936. It rejected Lyndon B. Johnson in 1964 during his 44-state landslide. Barry Goldwater carried it by 13 points, a major reason why Idaho was Johnson's closest state. In 2008 the presidential election in Ada County was more competitive than in previous years; John McCain defeated Barack Obama by six percentage points. Obama became the first Democrat to garner as much as 40 percent of the county's vote since Lyndon B. Johnson. In 2016, Donald Trump won the county by only a plurality due to high third party performance. In 2020, whereas the state of Idaho voted very strongly for Trump, he carried Ada County by a slim majority, only beating Joe Biden by around 3 percentage points. The election was close due to Biden's strength in Boise's downtown urban core, which gave him 59.2% of the vote to Trump's 37.4%. This is the narrowest election in decades for Ada County, and the closest a Democrat has come to carrying the county since 1940. Yet, in 2024, this trend reversed, with Trump once again taking the majority in the county with 53.76% of the vote. This was the best performance for a Republican presidential candidate in Ada County since Mitt Romney in 2012.

Democratic gubernatorial nominee Jerry Brady carried the county in his 2002 and 2006 races, despite losing statewide in both contests. Another prominent Democrat, Boise mayor David Bieter, was elected in 2007, 2011 and 2015.

Ada County is split between the first and second congressional districts; it is the only county in the state that is not located entirely within one district. As of 2022, the first district is represented by Russ Fulcher and includes Meridian, Eagle and Kuna, while the second district is represented by Mike Simpson and includes most of Boise proper. Both Fulcher and Simpson are Republicans.

In the Idaho Legislature, Ada County is split among nine districts, the most of any county. Each district elects one state senator and two state representatives. As of 2022, In the state senate, Republicans hold five seats and Democrats hold four. In the state house, Republicans hold ten seats and Democrats hold eight. Generally, Democratic strength is concentrated in Boise itself, while Republican strength is concentrated in the western suburbs. Several of the Boise seats were Democratic pickups in 2006.

Each party held all of their respective legislative seats in the 2008 elections, but Republicans won two competitive county commission races.

Ada County registered voters by political party (as of November 2, 2020)
Political Party	Constitution	Democratic	Libertarian	Republican	Unaffiliated	Total registered voters
Number of registered voters	921	60,167	4,199	161,707	100,962	327,956

United States presidential election results for Ada County, Idaho
Year	Republican		Democratic		Third party(ies)	
Year	No.	%	No.	%	No.	%
1892	1,170	41.39%	0	0.00%	1,657	58.61%
1896	851	35.33%	1,531	63.55%	27	1.12%
1900	2,706	56.63%	2,072	43.37%	0	0.00%
1904	4,536	69.51%	1,466	22.46%	524	8.03%
1908	4,778	53.08%	3,721	41.34%	503	5.59%
1912	3,198	32.00%	2,569	25.71%	4,227	42.30%
1916	5,299	48.32%	5,207	47.48%	460	4.19%
1920	8,419	66.72%	4,173	33.07%	27	0.21%
1924	7,220	54.47%	3,780	28.52%	2,255	17.01%
1928	10,279	71.84%	3,921	27.40%	108	0.75%
1932	8,055	45.97%	8,836	50.43%	631	3.60%
1936	7,581	36.85%	12,027	58.46%	966	4.70%
1940	12,861	50.85%	12,381	48.95%	51	0.20%
1944	13,410	55.54%	10,667	44.18%	67	0.28%
1948	14,972	56.06%	11,253	42.14%	480	1.80%
1952	27,415	72.65%	10,281	27.24%	40	0.11%
1956	26,387	69.96%	11,328	30.04%	0	0.00%
1960	27,703	61.95%	17,017	38.05%	0	0.00%
1964	25,404	56.40%	19,639	43.60%	0	0.00%
1968	30,185	63.04%	11,529	24.08%	6,167	12.88%
1972	36,665	67.51%	12,687	23.36%	4,959	9.13%
1976	41,135	64.39%	21,125	33.07%	1,629	2.55%
1980	55,205	63.79%	21,324	24.64%	10,015	11.57%
1984	60,036	72.40%	21,760	26.24%	1,128	1.36%
1988	54,951	62.92%	30,525	34.95%	1,858	2.13%
1992	49,000	44.48%	31,941	28.99%	29,225	26.53%
1996	61,811	52.50%	43,040	36.55%	12,892	10.95%
2000	75,050	60.78%	40,650	32.92%	7,785	6.30%
2004	94,641	61.05%	58,523	37.75%	1,866	1.20%
2008	93,328	51.63%	82,236	45.49%	5,196	2.87%
2012	97,554	53.53%	77,137	42.33%	7,555	4.15%
2016	93,752	47.91%	75,677	38.68%	26,240	13.41%
2020	130,699	49.98%	120,539	46.10%	10,250	3.92%
2024	143,759	53.36%	116,116	43.10%	9,558	3.55%

=== County offices ===
The county government is administered by the Ada County Board of Commissioners, a three-member legislative body. Other elected officials include clerk, treasurer, sheriff, assessor, coroner, and prosecutor.

County elected offices
Office	Office holder	Party
Assessor	Rebecca Arnold	Republican
Clerk of the Circuit Court	Trent Tripple	Republican
County Commissioner District 1	Ryan Davidson	Republican
County Commissioner District 2	Rod Beck (chair of the board)	Republican
County Commissioner District 3	Tom Dayley	Republican
Coroner	Richard Riffle	Republican
Prosecutor	Jan M. Bennetts	Republican
Sheriff	Matthew Clifford	Republican
Treasurer	Elizabeth Mahn	Republican

The Idaho Department of Correction operates the South Boise Prison Complex, a correctional facility located in unincorporated Ada County, south of the Boise Airport and east of Kuna.

== Education ==
Public School districts

School districts include:

- Boise School District
- Kuna Joint School District 3
- Melba Joint School District 136
- West Ada School District (Meridian Joint School District 2)

Residents are in the area (and the taxation zone) for College of Western Idaho.

== Communities ==
=== Cities ===
- Boise (county seat and state capital)
- Eagle
- Garden City
- Kuna
- Meridian
- Star

=== Census-designated places ===
- Avimor
- Hidden Springs

=== Unincorporated communities ===
- Mora
- Pleasant Valley
- Sonna

=== Population ranking ===
The population ranking of the following table is based on the 2020 census of Ada County.

† county seat

Rank	Cities	Municipal type	Population (2022 Estimate)	Population (2020 Census)
1	† Boise	City	236,634	235,684
2	Meridian	City	129,736	117,635
3	Eagle	City	32,399	30,346
4	Kuna	City	27,229	24,011
5	Star	City	14,646	11,117
6	Garden City	City	12,927	12,316
7	Hidden Springs	CDP	—	3,076
8	Avimor	CDP	—	1,255

== See also ==
- List of counties in Idaho
- National Register of Historic Places listings in Ada County, Idaho
