= Phil Hart (politician) =

American politician from Idaho

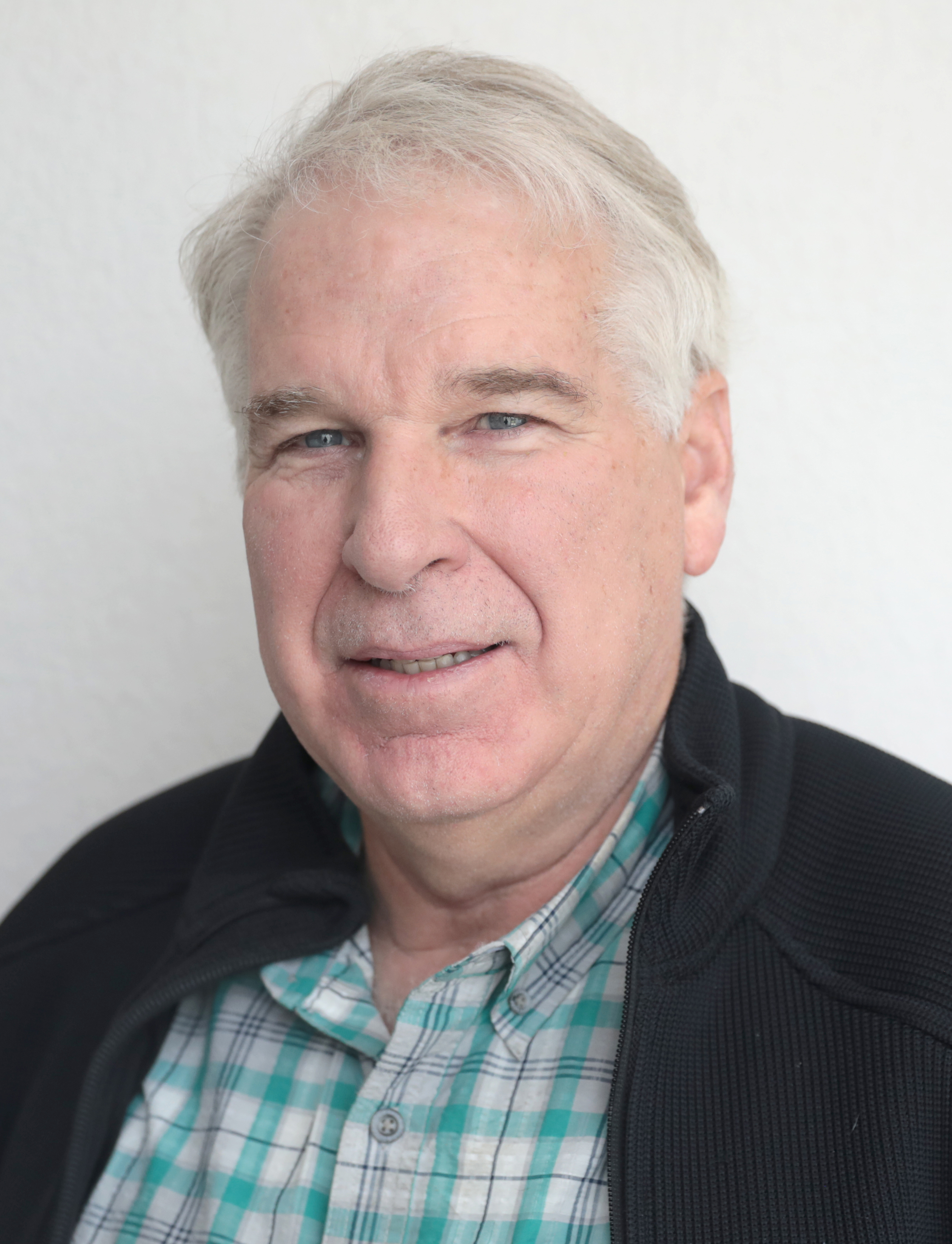
- Hart at the 2022 Hazlitt Summit hosted by Young Americans for Liberty

Member of the Idaho Senate from the 2nd district
- Incumbent
- Assumed office December 1, 2022
- Preceded by: Steve Vick

Member of the Idaho House of Representatives from the District 3 seat B district
- In office December 1, 2004 – November 30, 2012
- Preceded by: Wayne R. Meyer
- Succeeded by: Frank Henderson (redistricting)

Personal details
- Party: Republican
- Education: University of Utah; Wharton School of the University of Pennsylvania
- Occupation: Politician
- Website: hart4idaho.us

Phil Hart is an American politician and businessman, serving in the Idaho Senate since 2022. A member of the Republican Party, he previously served in the Idaho House of Representatives for Legislative District 3B from 2004 to 2012.

Hart is notable for having stopped filing both federal and state income tax returns in 1996, while he unsuccessfully pressed a federal lawsuit challenging the federal income tax as unconstitutional. After the case was rejected, he began filing returns again, but he continued to fight an order to pay more than $53,000 in back state income taxes.

== Education ==
Hart earned his bachelor's degree in civil engineering from the University of Utah and his MBA from the Wharton School of the University of Pennsylvania.

== Elections ==
2018

Hart was defeated by incumbent Paul Shepherd in the Republican primary taking 41.3% of the vote.

2012

Redistricted to 2B, Hart lost the four-way May 15, 2012, Republican primary to Ed Morse, getting only 31.2% of the vote.

2010

Hart was unopposed in the Republican primary.

Hart won the general election with 80.1% of the vote against write-in candidate Howard Griffiths.

2008

Hart won the Republican primary with 2,714 votes against David Rawls.

Hart was unopposed for the general election votes.

2006

Hart won the Republican primary with 57% of the vote, again against Wayne R. Meyer.

Hart was unopposed for the general election.

2004

Hart challenged Wayne R. Meyer in the May 25, 2004, Republican primary, winning with 60.25% of the vote.

Hart won the general election by defeating Wayne R. Meyer again, this time as a write-in candidate, with 91% of the vote.

2002

When Republican Representative Kris Ellis was re-districted to District 4, Hart ran as the Constitution Party nominee, but lost the November 5, 2002, general election to Republican Wayne R. Meyer, only getting 31.7% of the vote.
