= Idaho's 3rd legislative district =

American legislative district

- A map of the 3rd legislative district
Senator
Doug Okuniewicz; R–Hayden
since 2022
Representative
Vito Barbieri; R–Dalton Gardens
since 2010
Jordan Redman; R–Coeur d' Alene
since 2022
- Demographics: 89.93% White; 0.25% Black; 4.53% Hispanic; 0.74% Native American; 1.24% Other
- Population (2020): 53,953

Idaho's 3rd legislative district is one of 35 districts of the Idaho Legislature. It currently comprises part of Kootenai County.

It is currently represented by State Senator Doug Okuniewicz, Republican of Hayden, as well as state representatives Barbieri, Republican of Dalton Gardens, and Jordan Redman, Republican of Coeur d' Alene.

== District profile ==
=== 1992–2002 ===
From 1992 to 2002, District 3 consisted of a portion of Kootenai County.

Legislature	Session	Senate	House Seat A	House Seat B
52nd (1992 - 1994)	1st	Dennis Davis (D)	Marvin Vandenberg (D)	Jenkins (D)
52nd (1992 - 1994)	2nd	Dennis Davis (D)	Marvin Vandenberg (D)	Jenkins (D)
53rd (1994 - 1996)	1st	Gordon Crow (R)	Marvin Vandenberg (D)	Jeff Alltus (R)
53rd (1994 - 1996)	2nd	Gordon Crow (R)	Marvin Vandenberg (D)	Jeff Alltus (R)
54th (1996 - 1998)	1st	Gordon Crow (R)	Jim Clark (R)	Jeff Alltus (R)
54th (1996 - 1998)	2nd	Gordon Crow (R)	Jim Clark (R)	Jeff Alltus (R)
55th (1998 - 2000)	1st	Gordon Crow (R)	Jim Clark (R)	Jeff Alltus (R)
55th (1998 - 2000)	2nd	Gordon Crow (R)	Jim Clark (R)	Jeff Alltus (R)
56th (2000 - 2002)	1st	John Goedde (R)	Jim Clark (R)	Kris Ellis (R)
56th (2000 - 2002)	2nd	John Goedde (R)	Jim Clark (R)	Kris Ellis (R)

=== 2002–2012 ===
From 2002 to 2012, District 3 consisted of a portion of Kootenai County.

Legislature	Session	Senate	House Seat A	House Seat B
57th (2002 - 2004)	1st	Kent Bailey (R)	Jim Clark (R)	Wayne R. Meyer (R)
57th (2002 - 2004)	2nd	Kent Bailey (R)	Jim Clark (R)	Wayne R. Meyer (R)
58th (2004 - 2006)	1st	Mike Jorgenson (R)	Jim Clark (R)	Phil Hart (R)
58th (2004 - 2006)	2nd	Mike Jorgenson (R)	Jim Clark (R)	Phil Hart (R)
59th (2006 - 2008)	1st	Mike Jorgenson (R)	Jim Clark (R)	Phil Hart (R)
59th (2006 - 2008)	2nd	Mike Jorgenson (R)	Jim Clark (R)	Phil Hart (R)
60th (2008 - 2010)	1st	Mike Jorgenson (R)	Jim Clark (R)	Phil Hart (R)
60th (2008 - 2010)	2nd	Mike Jorgenson (R)	Jim Clark (R)	Phil Hart (R)
61st (2010 - 2012)	1st	Steve Vick (R)	Vito Barbieri (R)	Phil Hart (R)
61st (2010 - 2012)	2nd	Steve Vick (R)	Vito Barbieri (R)	Phil Hart (R)

=== 2012–2022 ===
District 3 currently consists of a portion of Kootenai County.

Legislature	Session	Senate	House Seat A	House Seat B
62nd (2012 - 2014)	1st	Bob Nonini (R)	Ron Mendive (R)	Frank Henderson (R)
62nd (2012 - 2014)	2nd	Bob Nonini (R)	Ron Mendive (R)	Frank Henderson (R)
63rd (2014 - 2016)	1st	Bob Nonini (R)	Ron Mendive (R)	Don Cheatham (R)
63rd (2014 - 2016)	2nd	Bob Nonini (R)	Ron Mendive (R)	Don Cheatham (R)
64th (2016 - 2018)	1st	Bob Nonini (R)	Ron Mendive (R)	Don Cheatham (R)
64th (2016 - 2018)	2nd	Bob Nonini (R)	Ron Mendive (R)	Don Cheatham (R)
65th (2018 - 2020)	1st	Don Cheatham (R)	Ron Mendive (R)	Tony Wisniewski (R)
65th (2018 - 2020)	2nd	Don Cheatham (R)	Ron Mendive (R)	Tony Wisniewski (R)
66th (2020 - 2022)	1st	Peter Riggs (R)	Ron Mendive (R)	Tony Wisniewski (R)
66th (2020 - 2022)	2nd	Peter Riggs (R)	Ron Mendive (R)	Tony Wisniewski (R)

=== 2022–present ===
In December 2022, District 3 will consist of a portion of Kootenai County.

== See also ==
- List of Idaho senators
- List of Idaho representatives
