= Coeur d'Alene High School =

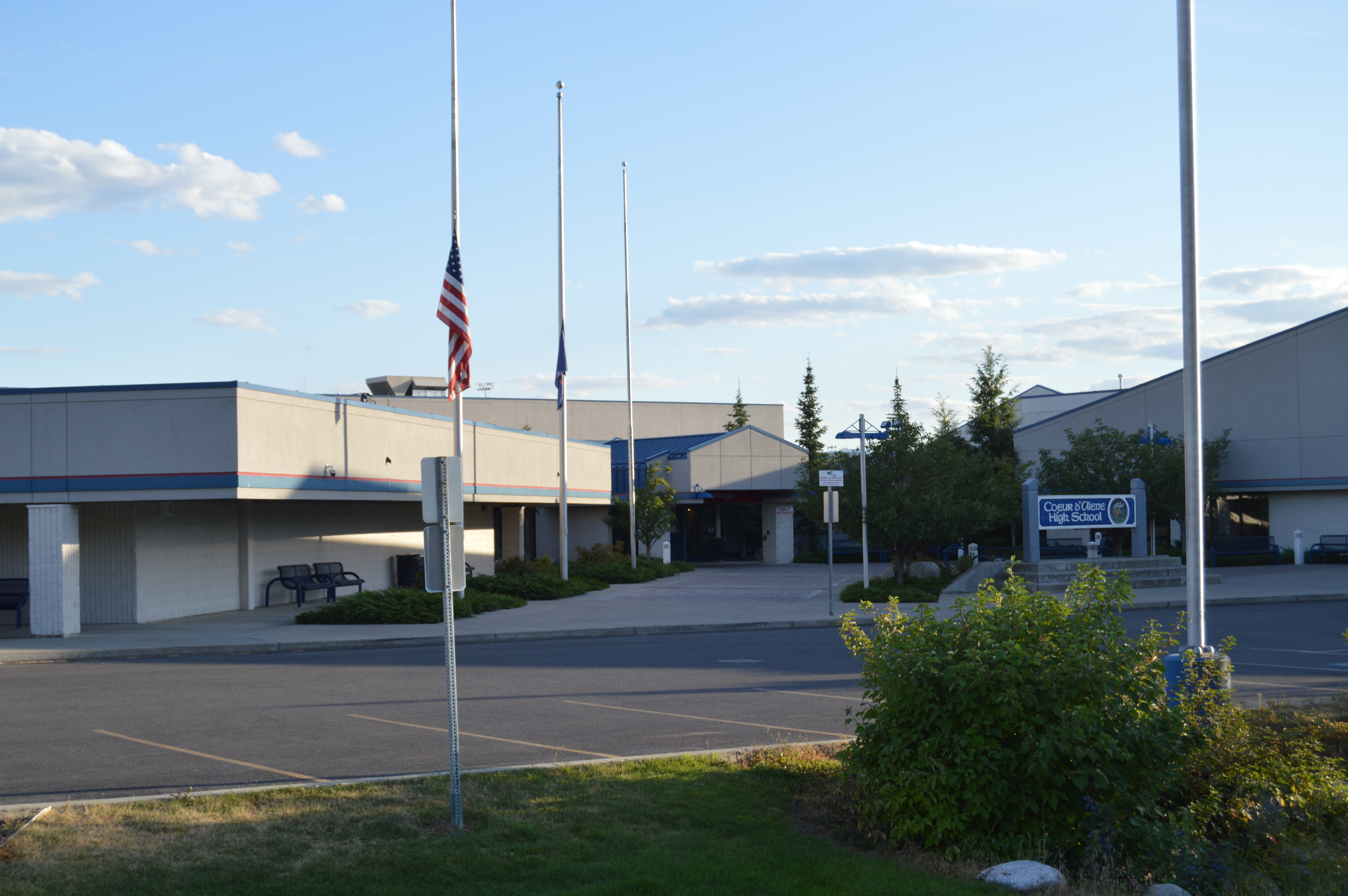
- Coeur d'Alene High School (CDA High School), 5530 North Fourth Street (Kootenai County); Coeur d'Alene, Idaho, (founded 1903, current building built 1969), (photo taken in August 2015)

Location
- 5530 North Fourth Street; Coeur d'Alene, Idaho 83815; United States; 47.721°N 116.777°W

Information
- Type: Public School / Secondary school
- Founded: 1903; 123 years ago, 1969 (current)
- School district: Coeur d'Alene S.D. #271
- NCES School ID: 160078000149
- Principal: Victoria Beecher
- Teaching staff: 76.43 (FTE)
- Grades: 9–12
- Enrollment: 1,477 (2023–2024)
- Student to teacher ratio: 19.32
- Colors: Blue & White
- Athletics: Idaho High School Activities Association (IHSAA), Class 5A
- Athletics conference: Inland Empire League (5A) (IEL)
- Nickname: "Vikings"
- Rivals: Lake City High School, Post Falls High School
- Yearbook: "The Viking"
- Feeder schools: Canfield Middle School; Lakes Magnet Middle School
- Elevation: 2,250 ft (685 m) AMSL
- Website: www.cdaschools.org/o/chs

Coeur d’Alene High School is a four-year public secondary school in Coeur d'Alene, Idaho, the oldest secondary school (founded 1903), with its current building at 5530 North Fourth Street built in 1968–1969. It is one of the two traditional high schools in the Coeur d'Alene School District #271. It serves the northeastern half of the district, with students from the cities of Coeur d'Alene, Dalton Gardens, Hayden, and a portion of unincorporated Kootenai County. The school colors are Blue and White and the C.D.A.H.S. mascot is a "Viking" and the athletic teams are named the "Vikings".

== Demographics ==
The demographic breakdown of the 1,471 students enrolled for the 2012–2013 school year was:

- Male - 53.4%
- Female - 46.6%
- Native American/Alaskan - 0.7%
- Asian/Pacific islanders - 1.4%
- Black - 1.4%
- Hispanic - 3.9%
- White - 91.4%
- Multiracial - 1.2%

In addition, 30.3% of the students were eligible for free or reduced lunch.

== Athletics ==
Coeur d'Alene competes in athletics in IHSAA Class 5A, with the largest schools in the state. It is a member of the Inland Empire League (5A) (IEL).

=== Rivalries ===
The primary rival of CHS is Lake City, the second high school in the city which opened 32 years ago in 1994 and draws from the south and west areas of the school district. Other 5A schools in north Idaho include nearby Post Falls (5A since 2006) to the west, and Lewiston, 120 miles (190 km) to the south. All four are members of the Inland Empire League (5A).

Ninety miles (140 km) to the south on the Palouse, Moscow was a longtime rival of CDA in the IEL until it dropped to A-2 in 1979 and is now in Class 4A. Sandpoint to the north was a traditional IEL rival, but is also now in 4A.

A long distance from the majority of 5A teams in southern Idaho, the Greater Spokane League in nearby Spokane County provides a number of large-school opponents for the Vikings.

=== State titles ===
==== Boys ====
- Football (5): fall 1982, 1985, 2010, 2011, 2013 (official with introduction of A-1 (now 5A) playoffs in fall 1979)
  - (unofficial poll titles - 0) (poll introduced in 1963, through 1978)
- Cross Country (1): fall 2011 (introduced in 1964)
- Basketball (6): 1928, 1945 (north), 1949, 1963, 1973, 1998
- Wrestling (2): 2010, 2011 (introduced in 1958)
- Golf (5): 1996, 1998, 1999, 2000, 2004 (introduced in 1956)

==== Girls ====
- Cross Country (4): fall 1982, 1985, 2004, 2012 (introduced in 1974)
- Soccer (1): fall 2006(introduced in 2000)
- Volleyball (1): fall 1987 (introduced in 1976)
- Basketball (8): 1984, 1991, 1992, 1994, 2000, 2008, 2009, 2010 (introduced in 1976)
- Softball (5): 1998, 1999, 2006, 2007, 2012 (introduced in 1997)
- Track (1): 1991 (introduced in 1971)

== Notable alumni ==
- John Friesz (born 1967) — College Football Hall of Fame member
- Duane Hagadone (1932–2021) — newspaper publisher, urban planner, real estate and land developer
- Emery Knudson (1896–1974) — Idaho Supreme Court (state supreme court) justice (1959–1965)
- Robert Leeper (1891–1932) — Idaho Supreme Court justice (1932)
- Don Monson (born 1933) — college basketball head coach at University of Idaho "Vandals" men's basketball (1978–1983) and University of Oregon "Ducks" men's basketball (1983–1992)
- Steve Parker (born 1956) — American football player, New Orleans Saints in the National Football League (NFL)
- Bruce Reed — American political advisor and non-profit administrator
- Tim Remington — (class of 1979), American pastor and Idaho legislator
- Louise M. Shadduck (1915–2008) — (class of 1933), American journalist and author
- Colson Yankoff (born 2000) — American football player, Washington Commanders, played college football for the University of Washington
