= Senator Hammond (disambiguation) =

James H. Hammond (1807–1864) was a U.S. Senator from South Carolina from 1857 to 1860. Senator Hammond may also refer to:

- Charles Hammond (lawyer and journalist) (1779–1840), Ohio State Senate
- Chauncey B. Hammond (1882–1952), New York State Senate
- Edward Hammond (politician) (1812–1882), Maryland State Senate
- Jabez Delano Hammond (1778–1855), New York State Senate
- Jay Hammond (1922–2005), Alaska State Senate
- Jim Hammond (Idaho politician) (born 1950), Idaho State Senate
- Johnie Hammond (born 1932), Iowa State Senate
- Samuel H. Hammond (1809–1878), New York State Senate
- Samuel Hammond (1757–1842), Georgia State Senate
- Scott Hammond (politician) (born 1966), New York State Senate
- Stephen H. Hammond (1828–1910), New York State Senate
