= Joyce Broadsword =

American politician

Member of the Idaho Senate from District 2
- In office December 1, 2004 – December 1, 2012
- Preceded by: Martha Calabretta
- Succeeded by: Steve Vick

Personal details
- Born: June 18, 1958 (age 68) Sandpoint, Idaho
- Party: Republican
- Spouse: John
- Profession: Owner

Joyce M. Broadsword (born June 18, 1958, in Sandpoint, Idaho) served as a Republican Idaho State Senator from 2004 to 2012 representing the 2nd District.

== Early life and career ==
Broadsword attended Sandpoint High School and graduated in 1976. She and her husband, John, have been married for more than 30 years, are the parents of three children: Brian, Andrew, and J.C., and have seven grandchildren.

She has owned Northern Log Homes since 1978, Contracted Courier Service since 1993, B&B Builders since 2001, and served as an executive of the Downtown Sandpoint Business Association in 2004. She volunteered for Larry Craig for Senate in 1990, 1996, and 2002. She was a volunteer for Dirk Kempthorne for governor in 1998 and 2002. She was City coordinator for Butch Otter for Idaho Campaign in 2002.

In 2013, Broadsword accepted the position of North Idaho Regional Director for the Department of Health and Welfare .

== Committees ==
- Finance, member
- Finance Appropriations, member
- Health and Welfare, vice chair
- Transportation, member
- Member, 2010 Olympic Committee, 2006–present
- Senate representative, board of directors, Idaho Rural Partnerships
- Alternate delegate, Pacific Northwest Economic Region
- Senate representative, Western Legislative Forestry Task Force

== Organizations ==
Her involvement with organizations has included:

- President, Kootenai Better Community, 1990–present
- President/chair, Idaho Women in Timber, 1996–2001
- Chair, Federated Women in Timber, 2002–2003
- Treasurer, Idaho Women in Timber, Bonner Chapter, 2002–present
- Secretary, Rotary Club of Sandpoint, 2004–present
