= Senator Cheatham =

Senator Cheatham may refer to:

- Don Cheatham (fl. 2000s–2010s), Idaho State Senate
- Eddie Cheatham (born 1947), Arkansas State Senate
- Edward Saunders Cheatham (1818–1878), Tennessee State Senate
