= Electoral reform in Idaho =

Electoral reform in Idaho refers to proposals and efforts aimed at improving or modifying the state's electoral system, including changes to voting methods, ballot initiatives, and voter access laws.

== History ==
In 1909, Idaho briefly experimented with a ranked voting system in primary elections, requiring voters to indicate both first and second choices when more than two candidates ran. The system was short-lived and did not become a lasting part of Idaho's electoral framework.

Idaho added the initiative and referendum process to its state constitution in 1912 but did not pass enabling legislation until 1933, at which point citizens could begin qualifying initiatives and referendums for the ballot. Since then, the state has seen multiple reform efforts concerning both voting systems and the rules governing direct democracy.

== Initiative and referendum process reforms ==
In 2013, the Idaho Legislature passed Senate Bill 1108, revising the state's initiative process by introducing a geographic distribution requirement for signature collection. Prior to this bill, Idaho required initiative campaigns to gather signatures equal to 6% of registered voters statewide without a specific distribution mandate. SB 1108 mandated that, in addition to meeting the overall 6% threshold, signatures must be collected from at least 6% of registered voters in 18 of Idaho's 35 legislative districts. This change aimed to ensure broader geographic representation in the initiative process, making it more challenging for initiatives to qualify for the ballot by requiring support from multiple regions across the state.

The law was enacted in response to concerns that initiatives could qualify for the ballot with support concentrated in a few populous areas, potentially neglecting less-populated rural regions. By implementing the district-based requirement, the legislature sought to promote statewide engagement in the initiative process.

In 2021, lawmakers passed Senate Bill 1110, further increasing the 6% requirement to all 35 legislative districts. Opponents of the bill had argued that increasing the signature requirement to all 35 districts would make it nearly impossible for grassroots initiatives to qualify for the ballot, effectively stifling direct democracy in Idaho. In a landmark decision, the Idaho Supreme Court agreed, striking down the law as unconstitutional because it imposed an unreasonable burden on the people's right to legislate via initiative.

In 2023, Idaho State Senator Doug Okuniewicz introduced Senate Joint Resolution 101 (SJR 101), a proposal to achieve the aims of SB 1110 and circumvent the court's ruling through a constitutional amendment. SJR 101 passed the Senate 27–8 but ultimately failed in the House, receiving 39 votes out of 70, eight short of the two-thirds majority required to advance a constitutional amendment.

In 2025, Representative Bruce Skaug introduced House Bill 85, which proposed allowing the Idaho governor to veto voter-approved ballot initiatives that received less than two-thirds support. Under this bill, initiatives passing with a simple majority could be vetoed by the governor, while those with at least two-thirds approval would become law without requiring the governor's signature. This proposal aimed to align the initiative process more closely with the legislative process, where the governor has veto power over bills passed by the legislature.

== 2024 Open Primaries Initiative (Proposition 1) ==
In 2024, the group Idahoans for Open Primaries gathered enough signatures to place a measure on the ballot to replace the state’s closed partisan primaries with a nonpartisan top-four primary open to all voters, regardless of party affiliation. The initiative also proposed using ranked-choice voting in general elections for statewide and congressional offices.

Proposition 1 was defeated in the November 2024 general election, with approximately 70% of voters opposed. Critics raised concerns about voter confusion and the potential influence of outside groups, while supporters argued the changes would increase participation and reduce polarization.

== Legislative efforts to restrict voting access ==
In 2021, Idaho lawmakers introduced several bills aimed at modifying voting procedures, including:

- House Bill 88: This bill sought to criminalize ballot collection, commonly referred to as "ballot harvesting." It proposed making it a felony for individuals to collect and deliver more than six absentee ballots, with certain exceptions for family members and designated officials.
- House Bill 549: This legislation aimed to alter voter identification requirements by removing student IDs from the list of acceptable forms of identification for voting. It also proposed eliminating the option for voters without ID to sign an affidavit and removing same-day voter registration.

In 2025, House Bill 139 sought to limit absentee voting to specific groups, such as active-duty military members, individuals over 65, or those with certain hardships, effectively ending no-excuse absentee voting. In February 2025, the bill stalled in committee following largely negative testimony.

== See also ==
- Elections in Idaho
- Ranked-choice voting in the United States
- Initiatives and referendums in the United States
