= Jack Riggs =

American politician and physician (born 1954)

38th Lieutenant Governor of Idaho
- In office January 30, 2001 – January 6, 2003
- Governor: Dirk Kempthorne
- Preceded by: Butch Otter
- Succeeded by: Jim Risch

Member of the Idaho Senate from the 4th district
- In office December 1, 1996 – December 1, 2000
- Preceded by: Mary Lou Reed
- Succeeded by: Kathleen Sims

Personal details
- Born: 1954 (age 71–72) Coeur d'Alene, Idaho, U.S.
- Party: Republican
- Children: Peter Riggs
- Education: University of Idaho (BS), University of Washington (MD)

Jack Timothy Riggs (born 1954) is an American physician, businessman, and politician from Idaho who served as the 38th lieutenant governor of Idaho from 2001 to 2003.

== Career ==
Riggs worked as a physician in Coeur d'Alene. He has owned and operated his own real estate company, JaxGroup & JaxLand Real Estate, since 2007.

Riggs also worked as CEO of Pita Pit USA, Inc. from 2005, when it acquired the Pita Pit system (franchise) in the U.S., until 2018.

=== Idaho Senate ===
Riggs was unopposed in the Republican primary. Riggs defeated Democratic incumbent Mary Lou Reed and Ust candidate Charles Eberle with 51% of the vote in the general election. He was re-elected in 1998 and 2000.

=== Lieutenant governor of Idaho ===
He was appointed lieutenant governor by Governor Dirk Kempthorne in January 2001 to fill a vacancy left by the resignation of longtime Lieutenant Governor Butch Otter, who won a seat in the United States House of Representatives in the 2000 election.

Riggs ran for a full term in 2002 but was defeated by state senator Jim Risch in the Republican primary, ending his tenure as lieutenant governor.

== Personal life ==
His son, Peter Riggs, served in the Idaho Legislature.

Political offices
Preceded by C. L. "Butch" Otter	Lieutenant Governor of Idaho; January 30, 2001 – January 6, 2003	Succeeded by Jim Risch
