= Class Warfare (film) =

2001 American television film

- Promotional image
- Screenplay by: George Finch
- Directed by: Richard Shepard
- Starring: Lindsey McKeon
- Music by: Ken Harrison
- Countries of origin: United States; Canada
- Original language: English

Production
- Producers: Heather Zeegen; Raymond Massey; Neal H. Moritz; Lisa Richardson
- Editor: Jeremy Presner
- Running time: 96 minutes
- Production companies: British Columbia Film Commission; Dogwood Pictures; Jaffe/Braunstein Films; Muse Entertainment Enterprises; Original Film; USA Network
- Budget: $5 million

Original release
- Release: December 26, 2001

Class Warfare, also stylized as Cla$$ Warfare, is a 2001 American-Canadian made-for-television movie directed by Richard Shepard and starring Lindsey McKeon.

== Plot ==
While driving to school, Kristen Marshall, senior class president of her high school, accidentally hits Richard Ashbury, a socially minded cyclist posting flyers for a food and clothing drive. When Kristen's wealthy parents as well as her boyfriend Jason's wealthy parents go broke, her college dreams are crushed.

Kristen and Jason accompany their friend Graham to his father's lake house, where he has also invited Richard. When Richard reads the newspaper and realizes that he is holding a winning lottery ticket, Kristen sees her opportunity and attempts to seduce Richard in the pool, but he rejects her.

The next day Jason is convinced by Kristen to push Richard off a cliff during a hike but ends up slipping himself, only to be rescued by Richard. A disappointed Kristen kisses Richard during a game of Twister in order to inspire jealousy in Jason, who punches Richard. The next morning Jason apologizes, then he suggests another hike, during which he pushes Richard off the same cliff. Richard begs for help and Jason offers his belt but once Richard grabs it Jason drops Richard to the ground far below, killing him. Jason searches Richard's body but is unable to find the lottery ticket.

Jason returns to the lake house, claiming that it was too slippery from the rain to carry Richard back. That evening Richard struggles back to the house and dies on the floor. Graham demands that they take the body to the police. Kristen offers to drive Richard's body to the police herself but reconsiders and turns around halfway. She manages to find the ticket on Richard's body but is seen by Graham. She explains her situation to Graham, who then realizes that Jason pushed Richard and refuses to help them. Kristen convinces Jason to knock Graham out and beat in his skull with a fire iron.

When Graham's girlfriend Amber drives to the lake house and knocks on the door, Kristen sends Jason to drive Richard and Graham off a cliff in a car while she distracts Amber. The next morning Amber convinces them to search for Graham. They find the car wreck and report it to the police.

Jason discovers that Kristen has been lying to him about several things, while Amber discovers camcorder tapes of the group discussing the lottery ticket. They break into Amber's house and retrieve the tape, while Amber calls the police. Kristen buys some scratch-off tickets then she and Jason attempt to redeem the ticket, only to be told that it was purchased after the drawing and is not valid. Amber brings a police officer but Jason knocks him out with a tire iron. Jason and Kristen drive after Amber and Kristen throws the new tickets out of the car window before Jason crashes into a gas truck. Kristen's cigarette ignites both vehicles, and she and Jason both die in the explosion.

Amber later watches camcorder video of Richard planning to trick Kristen with his invalid lottery ticket, then scratches off Kristen's new tickets and finds a winning ticket for the grand prize. She conceals this information from her friend Maria.

== Cast ==
- Lindsey McKeon as Kristen Marshall
- Wade Carpenter as Jason Beckham
- Robin Dunne as Richard Ashbury
- Dave McGowan as Graham Jensen
- Kiele Sanchez as Amber Whidden
- Jessica Schreier as Mrs. Marshall
- Michael St. John Smith Mr. Marshall
- Kevin Mundy as Brad
- Hiro Kanagawa as Mr. Tanaka
- Sadie Lawrence as Amber's Sister
- Veena Sood as Maria
- Patricia Idlette as Lottery Attendant
- Laurie Murdoch as Marcus Wynne
- Brad Loree as Police Officer
- Zook Matthews as Grizzled Trucker
- Gerald Scarr as Sheriff

== Production ==
The film was produced by Dogwood Pictures, a division of Muse Entertainment Enterprises, together with the British Columbia Film Commission, Jaffe/Braunstein Films, Original Film, and the USA Network. Stunts were performed by veteran stuntman Alex Green.

== Broadcast and reception ==
The film was first broadcast on USA on Tuesday, June 26, 2001.

Laura Fries of Variety called it "a slickly produced teen thriller about pretty rich people who are willing do anything to stay rich." She went on to praise the film's "impressive production values" as well as its "slick visuals and panoramic scenery."

John Maynard of The Washington Post listed the film as one of the evening's "TV highlights".
