= Tom Dorr =

American politician from Idaho

Member of the Idaho House of Representatives from the District 4, seat A district
- In office December 1, 1994 – December 1, 1996
- Preceded by: Lou Horvath
- Succeeded by: Larry C. Watson

Personal details
- Born: California
- Party: Republican
- Occupation: Politician, businessman

Tom Dorr is an American politician from Idaho. Dorr was a Republican member of Idaho House of Representatives.

== Early life ==
Dorr was born in California.

== Career ==
As a businessman, Dorr owns a trucking company in Idaho.

On November 8, 1994, Dorr won the election and became a Republican member of Idaho House of Representatives for District 4, seat A. Dorr defeated Lou Horvath and Christopher A.C. Smith with 47.6% of the votes. On November 5, 1996, as an incumbent, Dorr sought a seat for District 4, seat A unsuccessfully. Dorr was defeated by Larry C. Watson.

== Personal life ==
In 1987, Dorr moved to Coeur d'Alene, Idaho. Dorr is married. Dorr has four children. Dorr and his family live in Post Falls, Idaho.
