= Jeff Alltus =

American politician from Idaho

Member of the Idaho House of Representatives from the District 3, seat B district
- In office December 1994 – December 2000
- Succeeded by: Kris Ellis

Personal details
- Born: February 5, 1955 Modesto, California
- Died: June 4, 2016 (aged 61) Hayden, Idaho
- Party: Republican
- Spouse(s): Margaret Alltus, Janice Alltus
- Children: 4
- Relatives: Ryan Alltus (son)
- Education: California State University, Stanislaus
- Occupation: Insurance agent, politician

Jeff Alltus is a former American politician from Idaho. Alltus is a former Republican member of Idaho House of Representatives.

== Early life ==
On February 5, 1955, Alltus was born in Modesto, California. Alltus' parents were Vernon and Faith (née Frederick) Alltus. In 1973, Alltus graduated from Thomas Downey High School in Modesto, California.

== Education ==
In 1980, Alltus earned a Bachelor of Arts degree in Psychology from California State University, Stanislaus.

== Career ==
In 1979, Alltus became an insurance agent with Jeff Alltus Insurance Services.

On November 8, 1994, Alltus won the election and became a Republican member of Idaho House of Representatives for District 3, seat B. Alltus defeated Al Sharon with 65.1% of the votes. On November 5, 1996, as an incumbent, Alltus won the election and continued serving District 3, seat B. Alltus defeated Alan Wasserman with 59.0% of the votes. On November 3, 1998, as an incumbent, Alltus won the election and continued serving District 3, seat B. Alltus defeated Larry Belmont with 59.1% of the votes.

== Personal life ==
In 1982, Alltus moved to Hayden, Idaho. Alltus' wife was Margaret. They have two children, Lindsey Alltus and Ryan Alltus.

In 2000, Alltus married Janice (Higgins) Carpenter, who became his second wife. Alltus had two children from his first wife and two step-children. Alltus and his family live in Hayden, Idaho.

Alltus' son Ryan Alltus is known for archery marksman and an elk hunter.

On June 4, 2016, Alltus died from cancer in Hayden, Idaho, U.S.
