= Lake City High School =

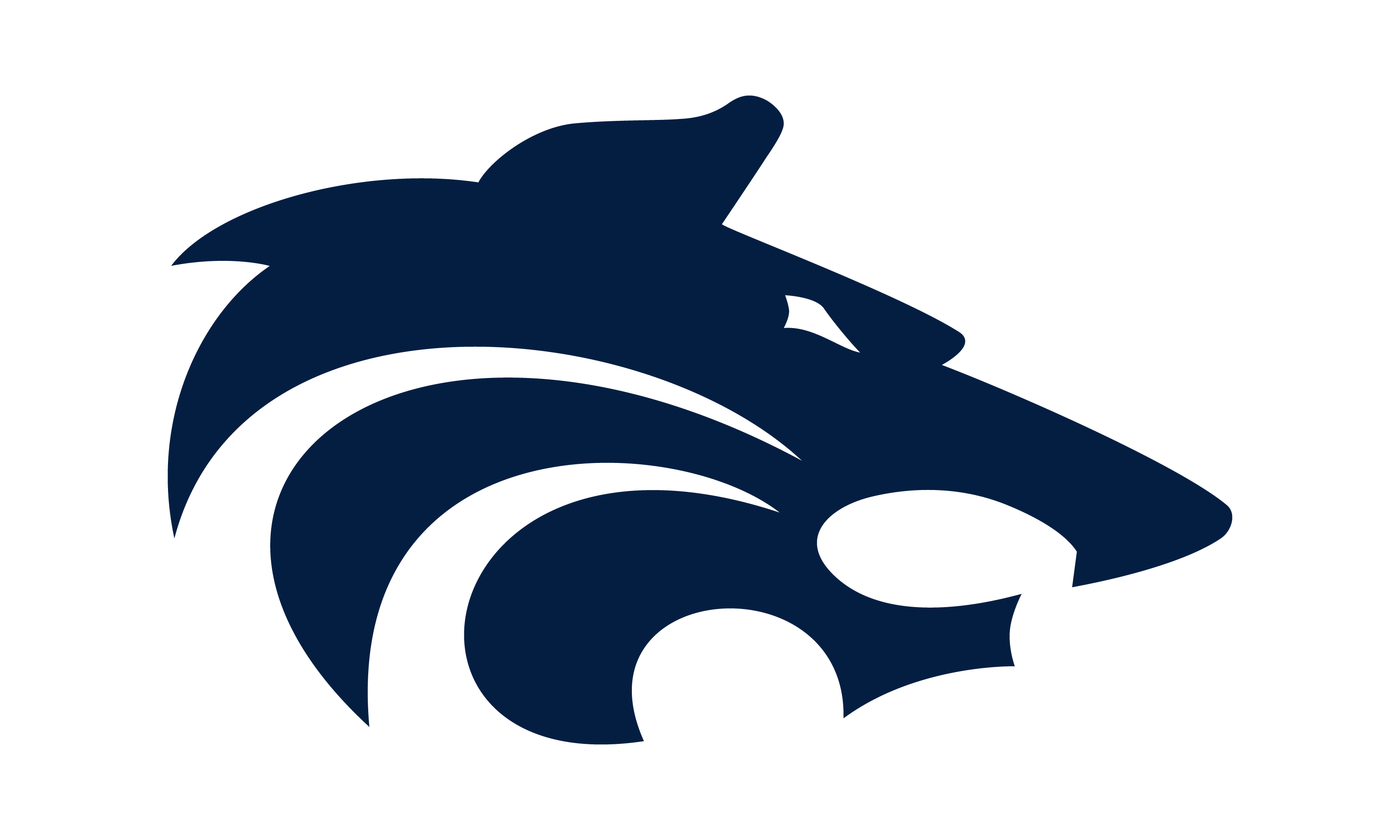

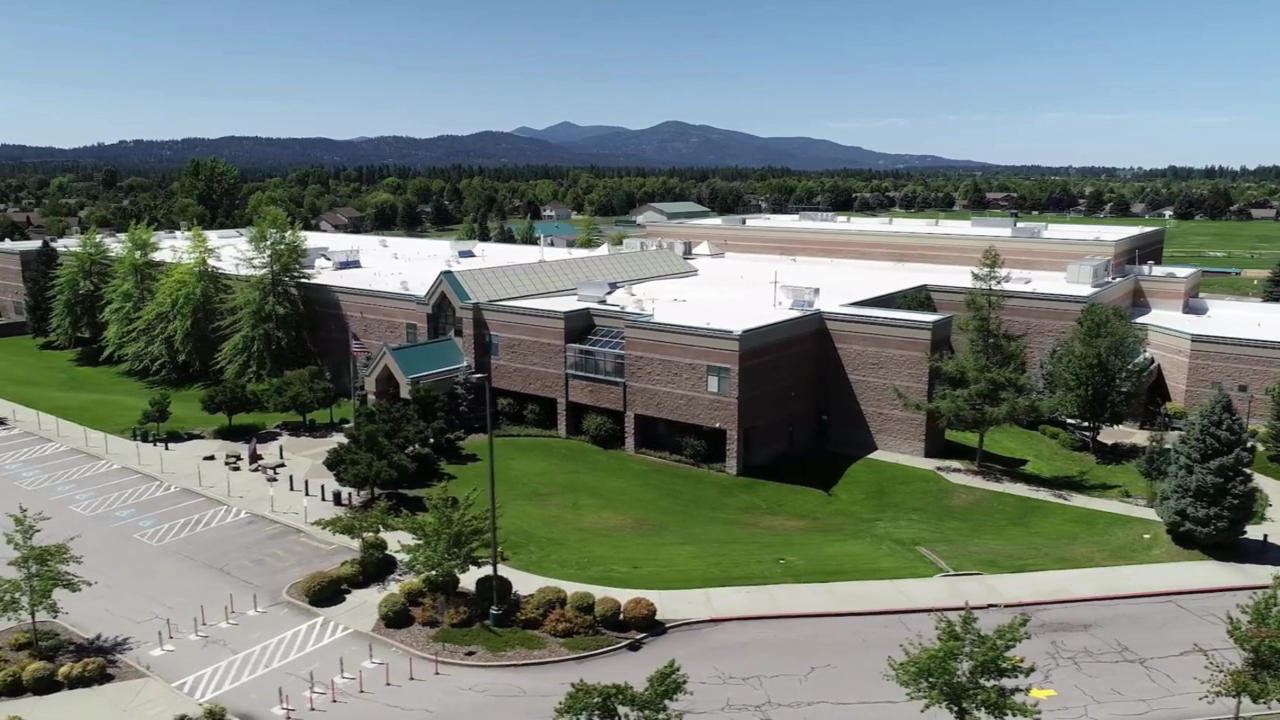

Location
- 6101 N. Ramsey Road; Coeur d'Alene, Idaho 83815; United States; 47.728°N 116.810°W

Information
- Other name: LCHS, Lake City
- Type: Public
- Motto: "For the Strength of the Pack is the Wolf, and the Strength of the Wolf is the Pack."
- Established: 1994; 32 years ago
- School district: Coeur d'Alene School District#271
- Superintendent: Shon Hocker
- CEEB code: 130119
- NCES School ID: 160078000291
- Principal: Bryan Kelly
- Faculty: 75.86 (FTE)
- Grades: 9–12
- Enrollment: 1,503 (2023-2024)
- Student to teacher ratio: 19.81
- Colors: Teal, Silver, & Navy Blue
- Slogan: "One School, One Family, United"
- Fight song: "Fight On"
- Athletics: IHSAA Class 6A
- Athletics conference: Inland Empire League (6A) (IEL)
- Mascot: Timberwolves
- Nickname: T-Wolves
- Rival: Coeur d'Alene High School
- Newspaper: Timberwolf Times
- Yearbook: "Timberwolf"
- Feeder schools: Woodland Middle School; Lakes Middle School; Canfield Middle School; Coeur d'Alene Charter Academy
- Elevation: 2,265 ft (690 m) AMSL
- Website: www.cdaschools.org/o/lchs

Lake City High School, sometimes referred to as Lake City or LCHS, is a four-year public secondary school in Coeur d'Alene, Idaho. The second high school in the city, LCHS opened in 1994 and draws from the southern and western areas of the Coeur d'Alene school district. The school's colors are navy blue, silver, and teal, and its mascot is the Timberwolf, which students commonly refer to as T-Wizzy.

The campus is located on a 45-acre (18 ha) (182,000 m^{2}) site on the corner of Ramsey Road and West Hanley Avenue. Lake City provides educational opportunities to over 1,600 students in grades 9–12. The high school includes several athletic fields, a 2,000 seat football stadium, three gyms, a large weight room, six tennis courts, a track, around 60 classrooms, and a large 400-seat auditorium.

== History ==
Lake City High School opened its doors in the fall of 1994 and graduated its first class in 1995 after a bond was passed by the voters of Kootenai County to open the second high school in the Coeur d'Alene School District. It was originally built with the capability to house approximately 1,200 students.

After around 24 years operating, a second bond was passed by voters in 2017 which provided funding for a remodel of the original facility, as well as an expansion to the parking lot, main gym and administration office. This bond also allowed for the addition of a second auxiliary gym, weight room and the construction of ten new classrooms. The 5 million dollar expansion created a new facility designed to support more than 1,600 students. With the new areas opening in 2018, the high school has provided many years of service to its students and community.

The school contains around 80 faculty members, five administrators, five guidance counselors, a part-time school psychologist, a part-time school prevention specialist and a college & career counselor. Lake City High School is accredited by AdvancEd and is considered a Four-Star school, being publicly recognized and celebrated for excellent performance as a top-performing school throughout the state of Idaho.

=== Awards and Certifications ===
On October 31, 2024, The school received a High Reliability School Certification from the Marzano Education Research Institution.

The school is currently ranked 29th in the state for overall education quality. It has also received a Best High School Certification from US News and World Report.

In 2007, Sports Illustrated honored Lake City High School with the title of Best Sports Program In Idaho for the 2006-2007 school year.

== Athletics ==
Lake City competes in athletics in IHSAA Class 6A, with the largest schools in the state. It is a member of the Inland Empire League (6A). The school offers several award-winning athletic programs. These include, Boys and Girls Soccer, Cheerleading, Swimming, Cross Country, Golf, Football, Volleyball, Boys and Girls Basketball, Wrestling, Baseball, Softball, Tennis, Track and Field, and Lacrosse.

=== State titles ===
==== Boys ====
- Football (2): fall (4A) 2002, (5A) 2006
- Soccer (3): fall 1996, 1998, 1999 (club sport prior to 2000, records not kept by IHSAA)
- Baseball (2) - 2007, 2016 (records not kept by IHSAA prior to 2025)
- Lacrosse (3) - 2007, 2014, 2017 (club sport, records not kept by IHSAA)
- Basketball (1) - 2023
- Swimming (1) - 2011
- Bowling (1) - 2022

==== Girls ====
- Soccer (3): fall 2012, 2016, 2021
- Basketball (2): 1995, 2007
- Softball (3): 2001, 2011, 2013
- Track (2): 2003, 2004
- Swimming (5): 1996, 2002, 2021, 2022, 2023

== Music & Drama ==
Lake City has an award-winning arts department. Every two years the choirs and bands participate in the Heritage Festival of Seattle. In 2006, the Lake City Symphonic and Jazz Band won first prize out of all schools in the Northwest, as did their orchestra. The Chamber Choir received a silver medal, the Jazz, Treble, and Concert choirs also received bronze medals.

The Lake City High School Marching Band performed for Good Morning America when it came to Coeur d'Alene on November 28, 2007.

It is also one of the few schools in the nation to be awarded the title of Grammy Signature School by the Grammy Foundation in 2004.

Lake City High School's Drama department, known as Troupe de Wolfe, stages two annual plays and occasionally a third. The department has achieved competitive success, winning numerous state runner-up titles, district third, second, and first titles, and boasting former state champions in various categories, most recently in the Original Humorous Category in 2023.

== Demographics ==
As of the 2025–2026 school year, the student body's racial and ethnic composition was as follows:

- Caucasian Students: 83.1%
- Hispanic Students: 9.6%
- Mixed-Race Students: 5%
- Asian Students: 1.4%
- Native American Students: 0.3%
- African American Students: 0.5%
- Native Hawaiian Students: 0.1%

== Notable alumni ==
- Colby Acuff, country music artist
- Blake Buchanan, center for the Iowa State Cyclones men's basketball team
- Byron Hout, Boise State Linebacker and former Montana State Defensive Coach
- Kaylee Goncalves, victim in the 2022 University of Idaho murders
- Kevin MacPhee, professional poker player
- Kyle Manzardo, first baseman for the Cleveland Guardians
- Madison Mogen, victim in the 2022 University of Idaho murders
- Peter Riggs, businessman and former member of the Idaho Senate
- Vanessa Shippy-Fletcher, Oklahoma State Softball Coach and Hall of Famer
- Ben Toews, Idaho Senator

== See also ==
- List of high schools in Idaho
