= Airline Disaster =

- Film poster
- Directed by: John J. Willis III (John "Jay" Willis III)
- Written by: Paul Sinor; Victoria Dadi
- Produced by: David Michael Latt; David Rimawi; Paul Bales
- Starring: Meredith Baxter; Scott Valentine; Lindsey McKeon
- Cinematography: Alexander Yellen
- Edited by: Mark Atkins
- Music by: Chris Ridenhour
- Production company: The Asylum
- Distributed by: The Asylum
- Release date: June 29, 2010
- Running time: 90 minutes
- Country: United States
- Language: English

Airline Disaster is an action disaster film directed by John J. Willis III and starring Meredith Baxter, Scott Valentine, Lindsey McKeon and Jay Beyers. It was distributed by The Asylum. The made-for-television film was broadcast in 2010 and released to home media in 2011.

== Plot ==
On a maiden flight with Coastal Airlines, the Starquest airliner program introduces the most sophisticated and enjoyable flying experience to date, with pilot Joseph Franklin (Scott Valentine) in charge. Special Agent Gina Vitale (Lindsey McKeon) is on the flight to protect Franklin, who is also the President's brother.

At Franklin's house, two thugs break in, kill the housekeeper and abduct his wife and children. A group of 10 neo-Nazis, who have sneaked guns onto the flight, force their way into the cockpit, killing the navigator. Agent Vitale makes it into the cargo hold and is able to contact her home base. Robert Stevens (Geoff Meed), the leader of the assault, forces the pilot to contact his sister, President Harriet Franklin (Meredith Baxter) and demands that 10 of his Argus Aryan Brotherhood be released.

A group of Lockheed Martin F-22 Raptor fighters tail the hijacked airliner, but one of them is destroyed in a fuel dump. When the autopilot malfunctions, the airliner plunges to the earth before pulling out of the dive just above a city. Willie (Amir Wilker) brings a flight attendant to the cargo hold, but encounters Vitale, who kills him. Other terrorists shoot a flight attendant, thinking she is the sky marshal. When the President does not release the "brothers", Robert shoots another flight attendant.

With an FBI SWAT team at the isolated cabin where Joe Franklin's family is held, in the White House, President Franklin gives the command to initiate "Kittyhawk", a secret system that can remotely control aircraft from a satellite. Just when the airliner goes out of control, the President realizes she must make a momentous decision, choosing between her family and the safety of the people in the cities below.

In the cargo hold, when Robert reveals that the skyjacking is a ruse for a bank heist, he is confronted by Vitale and chooses to trigger an explosion that not only kills him but results in the cargo door slicing off a jet engine. With the Starquest plummeting out of control and heading for Washington, the order to shoot it down results in the pursuing jet fighters being ineffective when the airliner's automated defense systems are triggered.

Finally acting to protect the passengers, the Sky Marshal (Peter Smith) is killed, but Vitale shoots the terrorists and takes back control of the Starquest. With the Franklin family rescued, the President resorts to a last-ditch attempt to down the aircraft. Using a new and unpredictable satellite-based laser results in taking out one of the trailing F-22 Raptors. She tells her brother to do the only thing left, pilot the Starquest to a water landing on the Potomac River, at Washington, D.C.

== Cast ==
- Meredith Baxter as President Harriet Franklin
- Lindsey McKeon as Special Agent Gina Vitale
- Scott Valentine as Joseph Franklin
- Geoff Meed as Robert Stevens
- Jude Gerard Prest as First Officer Bill Alexander
- Matt Lagan as National Security Advisor Cason
- Bart Baggett as Harry
- Londale Theus as Agent Melville
- Chip Ben as Fred
- Nicholas J. Leinbach as DJ Rocker
- Ed Callison as General Dillard
- Jim Boeven as "Snake"
- Carl Watts as Digrazzi
- Peter Smith as Sky Marshal
- Sarah Lieving as Annette Franklin (uncredited)
- Riley Polanski as Michael Franklin
- Piper Watts as Gwen Franklin
- Anthony Wemyss as Elton Loomis
- Amir Wilker as Willie
- Annie McCain Engman as Jeri
- Maria Frisk as Ruth
- Victoria Dadi as Denise
- William Morse as Buster
- Lauren McClain as Molly
- Stephen Blackehart as Chief of Staff DeToro

== Production ==
After a lengthy career as a cinematographer, electrician, gaffer and film crew member, John Willis III (credited as John "Jay"' Willis III) made his directorial debut in Airline Disaster.

== Release ==
Airline Disaster was released domestically on DVD on May 3, 2011, and internationally, on December 1, 2011. The DVD came with a "behind-the-scenes" film.

== Reception ==
On its release on Blu-ray, in a searing indictment of Airline Disaster, reviewer Martin Liebman, described the film as the epitome of "... epically bad and lazy movies". He further stated: "Unacceptable. Insulting. Unbelievable. 'Disaster' aptly describes this mind-boggling junk heap of a movie that's awful even by The Asylum's low standards."

Reviewer Jeffrey Long in the B-Movie Review of Airline Disaster, however, found "this is pretty close to as good as they can get in the B-Movie realm".

== See also ==
- The 9/11 Commission Report, a similar film also by The Asylum
