= Eric Redman (politician) =

American politician

Member of the Idaho House of Representatives
- In office December 1, 2014 – November 30, 2018
- Preceded by: Ed Morse
- Succeeded by: John Green
- Constituency: 2nd district Seat B

Personal details
- Born: January 26, 1946 (age 80)
- Party: Republican
- Children: 5, including Jordan
- Education: Washington State University
- Profession: Businessman and Insurance Agent

Military service
- Branch/service: United States Air Force
- Years of service: Four years

Eric Redman (born January 26, 1946) is a former US politician, who was a Republican Idaho State Representative from 2014 to 2018 representing District 2 in the B seat. He chose not to run for reelection in 2018, and was succeeded by John Green.

== Education and career ==
Redman was raised on a farm near Moscow, Idaho and graduated from Palouse High School in Palouse, Washington in 1964. He attended Washington State University on scholarship for two years before serving in the United States Air Force for four years during the Vietnam War.

Redman then made a career owning and operating several business and as an insurance agent, selling his agency to his children in 2012 before he ran for the legislature.

In 2021, Idaho Republican Party Chairman Tom Luna appointed Eric Redman to serve on Idaho's Independent Redistricting Commission.

== Idaho House of Representatives ==
In 2014, Redman ran against the one-term incumbent Ed Morse in the May Republican Primary, winning with 61% of the vote. He was unopposed in the general election.

In 2016, Redman defeated Alan Littlejohn in the Republican Primary with 63.09% of the vote. He was opposed by Richard Kohles in the general election, winning with 75.60% of the vote.

Redman supported Ted Cruz in the Republican Party presidential primaries, 2016.

=== Committee assignments ===
In the 2017 session, Redman sat on the Commerce and Human Resources, Health and Welfare, and Local Government Committees.

== Electoral history ==
District 2 House Seat B - Part of Kootenai County
Year	Candidate	Votes	Pct	Candidate	Votes	Pct
2014 Primary	Eric Redman	2,897	61.0%	Ed Morse (incumbent)	1,818	39.0%
2014 General	Eric Redman	11,637	100%			
2016 Primary	Eric Redman (incumbent)	2,890	63.1%	Alan Littlejohn	1,691	36.9%
2016 General	Eric Redman (incumbent)	17,735	75.6%	Richard Kohles	5,724	24.4%
