= Idaho's 2nd legislative district =

American legislative district

- A map of the 2nd legislative district
Senator
Phil Hart; R–Post Falls
since 2022
Representative
Heather Scott; R–Blanchard
since 2022
Dale Hawkins; R–Fernwood
since 2022
- Demographics: 89.32% White; 0.19% Black; 3.26% Hispanic; 2.54% Native American; 1.13% Other
- Population (2020): 52,071

Idaho's 2nd legislative district is one of 35 districts of the Idaho Legislature. It currently comprises Shoshone, Clearwater, and Benewah counties, as well as parts of Kootenai and Bonner counties.

It is currently represented by State Senator Phil Hart, Republican from Kellogg, as well as state representatives Heather Scott, Republican from Blanchard, and Dale Hawkins, Republican from Fernwood.

== Electoral history ==
=== 2020 ===
Legislative District 2 in Idaho has two seats for the state House of Representatives and one seat for the state Senate. Incumbent Republican state senator, Steve Vick was unopposed for the only senate seat for both the May primary and the November General election in 2020. Vito Barbieri won the election for House Seat A in the primary election, and he was also unopposed in the November general election. House Seat B incumbent Tim Remington did not run for reelection. Republican candidate Doug "Doug O" Okuniewicz won both the 2020 primary election and the general election for House Seat B.

Voter participation in the 2020 Idaho primary election was exclusively limited to absentee ballots. All polling locations were closed for the first time in the history of Idaho elections.

== Party affiliation ==
Party Affiliation as of January 2, 2018
Party	Registered	%
Republican	15,686	56.68%
Unaffiliated	9,721	35.12%
Democratic	2,009	7.26%
Libertarian	162	0.59%
Constitution	98	0.35%
Total	27,676	100%

== District profile ==
=== 1992–2002 ===
From 1992 to 2002, District 2 consisted of a portion of Bonner and Kootenai Counties.

Legislature	Session	Senate	House Seat A	House Seat B
52nd (1992–1994)	1st	Barbara Chamberlain (D)	Hilde Kellogg (R)	Wally Wright (D)
52nd (1992–1994)	2nd	Barbara Chamberlain (D)	Hilde Kellogg (R)	Wally Wright (D)
53rd (1994–1996)	1st	Clyde Boatright (R)	Hilde Kellogg (R)	Wayne R. Meyer (R)
53rd (1994–1996)	2nd	Clyde Boatright (R)	Hilde Kellogg (R)	Wayne R. Meyer (R)
54th (1996–1998)	1st	Clyde Boatright (R)	Hilde Kellogg (R)	Wayne R. Meyer (R)
54th (1996–1998)	2nd	Clyde Boatright (R)	Hilde Kellogg (R)	Wayne R. Meyer (R)
55th (1998–2000)	1st	Clyde Boatright (R)	Hilde Kellogg (R)	Wayne R. Meyer (R)
55th (1998–2000)	2nd	Clyde Boatright (R)	Hilde Kellogg (R)	Wayne R. Meyer (R)
56th (2000–2002)	1st	Clyde Boatright (R)	Hilde Kellogg (R)	Wayne R. Meyer (R)
56th (2000–2002)	2nd	Clyde Boatright (R)	Hilde Kellogg (R)	Wayne R. Meyer (R)

=== 2002–2012 ===
From 2002 to 2012, District 2 consisted of Benewah and Shoshone Counties and a portion of Bonner and Kootenai Counties.

Legislature	Session	Senate	House Seat A	House Seat B
57th (2002–2004)	1st	Martha Calabretta (D)	Mary Lou Shepherd (D)	Dick Harwood (R)
57th (2002–2004)	2nd	Martha Calabretta (D)	Mary Lou Shepherd (D)	Dick Harwood (R)
58th (2004–2006)	1st	Joyce Broadsword (R)	Mary Lou Shepherd (D)	Dick Harwood (R)
58th (2004–2006)	2nd	Joyce Broadsword (R)	Mary Lou Shepherd (D)	Dick Harwood (R)
59th (2006–2008)	1st	Joyce Broadsword (R)	Mary Lou Shepherd (D)	Dick Harwood (R)
59th (2006–2008)	2nd	Joyce Broadsword (R)	Mary Lou Shepherd (D)	Dick Harwood (R)
60th (2008–2010)	1st	Joyce Broadsword (R)	Mary Lou Shepherd (D)	Dick Harwood (R)
60th (2008–2010)	2nd	Joyce Broadsword (R)	Mary Lou Shepherd (D)	Dick Harwood (R)
61st (2010–2012)	1st	Joyce Broadsword (R)	Shannon McMillan (R)	Dick Harwood (R)
61st (2010–2012)	2nd	Joyce Broadsword (R)	Shannon McMillan (R)	Dick Harwood (R)

=== 2012–2022 ===
From 2012 to 2022, District 2 consisted of a portion of Kootenai County.

Legislature	Session	Senate	House Seat A	House Seat B
62nd (2012–2014)	1st	Steve Vick (R)	Vito Barbieri (R)	Ed Morse (R)
62nd (2012–2014)	2nd	Steve Vick (R)	Vito Barbieri (R)	Ed Morse (R)
63rd (2014–2016)	1st	Steve Vick (R)	Vito Barbieri (R)	Eric Redman (R)
63rd (2014–2016)	2nd	Steve Vick (R)	Vito Barbieri (R)	Eric Redman (R)
64th (2016–2018)	1st	Steve Vick (R)	Vito Barbieri (R)	Eric Redman (R)
64th (2016–2018)	2nd	Steve Vick (R)	Vito Barbieri (R)	Eric Redman (R)
65th (2018–2020)	1st	Steve Vick (R)	Vito Barbieri (R)	John Green (R)
65th (2018–2020)	2nd	Steve Vick (R)	Vito Barbieri (R)	Tim Remington (R)
66th (2020–2022)	1st	Steve Vick (R)	Vito Barbieri (R)	Doug Okuniewicz (R)
66th (2020–2022)	2nd	Steve Vick (R)	Vito Barbieri (R)	Doug Okuniewicz (R)

=== 2022–present ===
District 2 currently consists of Benewah, Clearwater, and Shoshone Counties and a portion of Bonner and Kootenai Counties.

Legislature	Session	Senate	House Seat A	House Seat B
67th (2022 - 2024)	1st	Phil Hart (R)	Heather Scott (R)	Dale Hawkins (R)
67th (2022 - 2024)	2nd	Phil Hart (R)	Heather Scott (R)	Dale Hawkins (R)

== See also ==
- List of Idaho senators
- List of Idaho representatives
