= Coeur d'Alene School District =

School district in Idaho, US

Coeur d'Alene School District #271
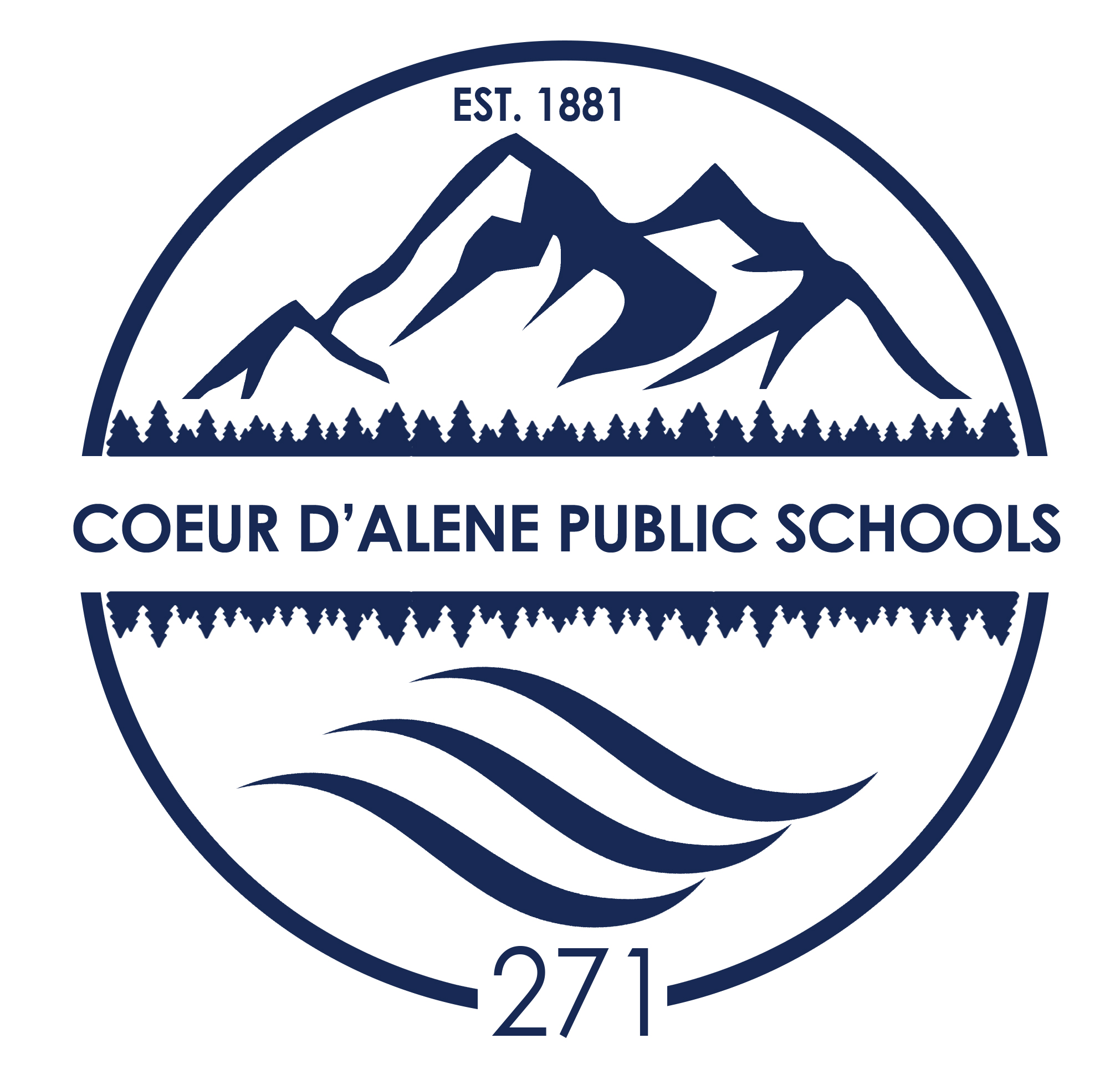

Location
- 1400 N Northwood Center Ct. Coeur d'Alene, Idaho Kootenai County, Idaho, 83814; United States
- Coordinates: 47.697878°N 116.805481°W

District information
- Type: Public
- Motto: "Invest, Inspire, Innovate"
- Grades: K-12
- Established: 1881
- Superintendent: Dr. Shon Hocker
- Deputy superintendent(s): Dr. Mike Nelson; Seth Deniston
- School board: Lesli Bjerke; Jimmy McAndrew; Allie Anderton; Heather Tenbrink
- Chair of the board: Rebecca Smith
- Director of education: Trent Derrick, Secondary Education; Heather Somers, Elementary Education
- Budget: $131 million
- NCES District ID: 1600780
- Affiliation(s): Idaho Department of Education; US Department of Education; City of Coeur d’Alene; City of Hayden; City of Dalton Gardens; Kootenai County

Students and staff
- Students: 10,171
- Teachers: 568
- Staff: 423
- Athletic conference: Inland Empire League (6A)

Other information
- Director of Human Resources: Eric Davis
- Director of Finance: Shannon Johnston
- Director of Community Relations: Stefany Bales
- Website: cdaschools.org/

The Coeur d'Alene School District #271 (also known as Coeur d'Alene Public Schools) is a school district in Coeur d'Alene, Idaho. District #271 serves a student population nearing 11,000 in Coeur d’Alene, Dalton Gardens, Hayden, Hayden Lake, and a portion of rural Kootenai County. The district includes 17 schools: 11 elementary schools, 3 middle schools, 2 traditional high schools, and an alternative high school. The school district also offer opportunities for students at a joint professional-technical high school campus (KTEC) shared by neighboring Lakeland and Post Falls school districts. District #271 is one of the largest employers in the five northernmost counties of Idaho, and ranks sixth in enrollment size among Idaho's 114 public school districts.

== Budget ==
District #271 operates on a total budget of nearly $131 million, approximately $98 million of which is general fund.

== Superintendent ==
Dr. Shon Hocker joined the District as Superintendent in July 2021.

== Schools ==
=== High schools ===
- Coeur d'Alene High School
- Lake City High School

=== Middle schools ===
- Canfield Middle School
- Lakes Middle School
- Woodland Middle School

=== Elementary schools ===
- Atlas Elementary School
- Bryan Elementary School
- Dalton Elementary School
- Hayden Meadows Elementary School
- Northwest Expedition Academy
- Skyway Elementary School
- Winton Elementary School

=== Specialty schools ===
- Fernan STEM Academy
- Kootenai Technical Education Campus – KTEC
- Ramsey Magnet School of Science
- Sorensen Magnet School of the Arts and Humanities
- Venture High School
