= Dan Schmidt =

American politician (born 1954)

Member of the Idaho Senate from District 5
- In office December 1, 2012 – December 1, 2016
- Preceded by: Jim Hammond
- Succeeded by: Dan Foreman

Member of the Idaho Senate from District 6
- In office December 1, 2010 – December 1, 2012
- Preceded by: Gary Schroeder
- Succeeded by: Dan Johnson

Personal details
- Born: August 3, 1954 (age 72) Salem, Oregon
- Party: Democratic
- Education: University of Washington
- Profession: Doctor

Dan J. Schmidt (born August 3, 1954, in Salem, Oregon) is an American politician and a former Democratic member of the Idaho Senate. He served as a state senator from 2010 to 2016.

== Education and career ==
Schmidt attended the University of Washington, where he earned his medical degree. He later served over ten years as the Latah County Coroner.

Schmidt was appointed by Senate Minority Leader Michelle Stennett to serve on Idaho's Independent Redistricting Commission.

== Elections ==
District 6 - Latah County
| Year | Candidate | Votes | Pct | Candidate | Votes | Pct |
|---|---|---|---|---|---|---|
| 2010 Primary | Dan Schmidt | 1,234 | 100% | | | |
| 2010 General | Dan Schmidt | 6,551 | 53.3% | Gresham Bouma | 5,741 | 46.7% |

District 5 - Latah and Benewah Counties
| Year | Candidate | Votes | Pct | Candidate | Votes | Pct |
|---|---|---|---|---|---|---|
| 2012 Primary | Dan Schmidt (incumbent) | 1,219 | 100% | | | |
| 2012 General | Dan Schmidt (incumbent) | 10,340 | 51.0% | Gresham Bouma | 9,936 | 49.0% |
| 2014 Primary | Dan Schmidt (incumbent) | 1,460 | 100% | | | |
| 2014 General | Dan Schmidt (incumbent) | 7,421 | 52.3% | John Carlson | 6,769 | 47.7% |
| 2016 Primary | Dan Schmidt (incumbent) | 1,458 | 100% | | | |
| 2016 General | Dan Schmidt (incumbent) | 10,939 | 49.2% | Dan Foreman | 11,275 | 50.8% |
