= Shredder (film) =

- Original DVD cover artwork
- Directed by: Greg Huson
- Written by: Craig Donald Carlson; Greg Huson
- Produced by: Geof Miller; Rory Veal
- Starring: Scott Weinger; Lindsey McKeon
- Cinematography: Charles Schner
- Edited by: Andi Armaganian
- Music by: Alan Derian
- Production company: Red Snow Films LLC
- Distributed by: MGM Home Entertainment
- Release date: December 16, 2003
- Running time: 86 minutes
- Country: United States
- Language: English
- Budget: $750,000

Shredder is a 2003 American slasher film directed by Greg Huson and starring Scott Weinger and Lindsey McKeon. It centers on a group of friends being stalked and murdered by an unknown assailant at an abandoned ski resort. It was filmed at the Silver Mountain Resort in Kellogg, Idaho, and released direct-to-video in the United States by MGM Home Entertainment.

== Plot ==
A man named Chad is snowboarding down a mountain, when suddenly a skier dressed in black attacks him. He attempts to get away, but is decapitated by a piece of wire strung up between two trees.

Meanwhile, college student Kimberly is going on a trip to an abandoned ski resort, which her father will be buying soon, with her boyfriend Cole, cousin Pike, and friends Skyler, Robyn, and Kirk. While stopping at a gas station, the group bump into the European Christophe, who they quickly invite along with them.

After arriving at the resort, Cole and Skyler go back into town to retrieve beer. They are warned away from the resort by a bartender, Bud. Skyler also briefly meets Bud's daughter Shelly to whom he takes a liking. Arriving back at the resort, the group partake in drinking games until the town Sheriff shows up. Kimberly and Robyn manage to bribe him to let them stay there for the night. However, as the Sheriff leaves the cabin he is stabbed to death by the skier. Kimberly then tells the others that a few years ago, a group of snowboarders murdered a young girl at the resort, and that's why it had closed down.

The next day, the group go snowboarding. Kirk stumbles upon a small building hidden in the mountain. As he enters to investigate, he is stabbed with an icicle by the skier. Meanwhile, Skyler bumps into Shelly while she skis. The two make out and decide to stick together but Bud appears and sends Shelly home, warning Skyler to leave the resort. As Robyn uses the chairlift, the killer boards with her and attempts to throw her off. Robyn fights back and manages to push him off the chairlift instead. But, as she prepares to deboard her scarf wraps around the handle and she is hanged as the lift drags her off the ground and dies.

At the cabin, Skyler meets up with Cole and Pike, before the trio stumble upon the Sheriff's body. The group quickly suspects Christophe as the murderer and set out to warn the others. While searching, they find the little girl preserved in ice and Skyler is stabbed in the leg with an axe by the skier. They manage to subdue the killer and escape. In a hot tub, Kimberly discovers Christophe was at the resort when the little girl was murdered, and that all the other witnesses had been murdered also. It is revealed the little girl was Bud's daughter as Christophe suspects him for the previous killings, as revenge for the death of his youngest daughter. Kimberly and Christophe then begin to have sex. Cole soon sees the pair and angrily leaves, prompting Kimberly to follow him. After they leave, Christophe is beaten to death with a shovel.

Returning to the cabin, the survivors find the car disabled and the dead bodies of their friends lined up in the snow. In the cabin, the group tend to Skyler's leg. Cole and Pike go outside to fix the car, leaving Kimberly and Skyler in the cabin. The skier sneaks inside and murders Skyler, stabbing him through the eye with a ski pole. Kimberly hides from the killer in a cupboard, where she finds Chad's body. The killer manages to break in the cupboard and stabs Kimberly with a poker. Cole rushes inside, but finds Kimberly dead before the skier locks him in the cabin.

Outside, Pike fixes the car as the skier swiftly attacks her. In a panic, she crashes the car before the skier hits her in the head. Cole manages to get outside and finds Pike's body. Cole travels up the mountain, taunting the killer. He is soon shot at by a figure, revealed to be Bud. Bud tells Cole he simply wanted to scare the group away from the area, but Cole tries to escape. Bud chases him on a snowmobile, and is quickly decapitated by a piece of wire strung up between two trees. Cole then makes his way into town. After entering an alley, he becomes trapped as the skier drives a large shredding truck to block his path. The killer is revealed to be Shelly, who wants revenge for the death of her younger sister. As she is about to murder Cole, Pike shows herself to be alive and shoots Shelly. Shelly then falls into the shredder, sending a fountain of blood into the air. Cole and Pike leave the town and presumably start a relationship.

== Cast ==
- Scott Weinger as Cole
- Lindsey McKeon as Kimberly
- Juleah Weikel as Pike
- Billy O'Sullivan as Skyler
- Holly Towne as Robyn
- Brad Hawkins as Christophe
- Peter Riggs as Kirk
- Candace Moon as Shelly
- Ron Varela as Bud
- Seth Reston as Sheriff
- Elliot Olson as Chad

== Production ==
=== Development ===
Director and co-screenwriter Gregory Huson developed the idea for a slasher film set at a ski resort after a blizzard left him 'snowed in' overnight at Iron Mountain resort, near Kirkwood in the Sierra Nevada in 1995, shortly before Iron Mountain's permanent closure. "The motel was seedier and moldier than almost anything you've seen in any horror movie," Huson recalled. Screenwriter Craig Carlson was commissioned for the original story and screenplay, from which Huson made multiple rewrites. The film was briefly in pre-production in the winter of 2000, with plans to film at Iron Mountain, then shuttered but briefly under new ownership. With a late start and a short winter, the project was canceled, quickly picked up in turn-around by Iris Entertainment producers Geof Miller and Rory Veal.

=== Filming ===
Shredder was filmed on location in March 2001 at the Silver Mountain Resort in Kellogg, Idaho over a period of seventeen days, with a budget of $750,000. (Note: The film's end credits thank several filming locations in the cities of Kellogg and Wallace.) After scouting multiple smaller ski areas throughout the northwest, the producers ultimately chose Silver Mountain Ski as the location still housed the original lodge, formerly 'Jackass ridge,' which was effectively abandoned. In 2001 Silver Mountain was only open 3 days per week, closed to the public Monday-Friday, a working modern ski resort to stand in for the abandoned resort at the center of the Shredder plot.

In spite of record snows earlier in the season, during filming the production was troubled by rising temperatures and rain, which caused a significant amount of snow to melt mid-way through the filming schedule. Taking advantage of local talent, the producers hired a total of twenty ski and snowboard doubles.

== Release ==
Shredder was released on DVD in the United Kingdom on September 9, 2002, by Third Millennium Entertainment. The film failed to find distribution in North America until the following year when it was acquired by MGM Home Entertainment, who released it direct-to-video and DVD on December 16, 2003. In Japan, the film was released under the name Jason Z, in an attempt to connect it with the then-recently released Friday the 13th sequel Jason X.

Scorpion Releasing issued a Blu-ray edition of the film on October 11, 2022.

=== Critical response ===
Steve Barton of Dread Central gave the film an unfavorable review, writing: "As a horror movie, Shredder couldn’t fail any worse. It’s not scary; the murderer is ridiculous (particularly when he’s skiing down the slopes in pursuit of victims) and the deaths, while mildly gory, fail to deliver any payoff whatsoever. Director Huson never manages to generate suspense or scares – the sole necessity when making a film of this ilk. Instead he infuses the proceeding with endless snowboarding footage, making the temptation to fast-forward even greater."

AllMovie reviewer Jeremy Wheeler gave the film a 1.5 out of 5-star-rating, writing: "Shredder is the kind of straight-to-video junk that proves there's still life in the bottom of the rental racks. Working off the archetypical frame of the "killer in the woods" scenario, this particularly bloody gem starts off with a gratuitous beheading and takes off from there. Of course, things do tend to get tedious after a while; with murders relegated to lame setups while the backstory plot nonsense takes the center stage. Thankfully, writer/director Greg Huson keeps the pace going and the mood light... Of course, this being an extreme sports flick, there has to be your obligatory, obnoxious snow boarder "dude" spouting off truly terrible—and at times, questionably dubbed–lines that'll make any viewer cringe far more than your worst bloody kill."

In a 2022 reassessment of the film, Paul Lê of Bloody Disgusting wrote favorably of it, observing: "What Shredder lacks in high production values it makes up for in sheer energy and cocky style. This is a spirited and sometimes spiffy-looking slasher with the verve of a music video. In addition to Alan Derian’s effectively sinister score are a number of pop-punk tracks that do little to stand out from one another, but they add to the movie’s overall zest."

As of February 2025, the film holds two favorable reviews and one unfavorable review on the internet review aggregator Rotten Tomatoes.

== Sources ==
- Senn, Bryan (2022). Ski Films: A Comprehensive Guide. Jefferson, North Carolina: McFarland. ISBN 978-1-476-67219-9.
