= Idaho's 4th legislative district =

American legislative district

Idaho's 4th legislative district, highlighted in purple, as of 2022

Idaho's 4th legislative district is one of 35 districts of the Idaho Legislature. It currently comprises part of Kootenai County.

It is currently represented by state senator Ben Toews, Republican of Coeur d'Alene, as well as state representatives Joe Alfieri, Republican of Coeur d'Alene, and Elaine Price, Republican of Coeur d'Alene.

== District profile ==
=== 1992–2002 ===
From 1992 to 2002, District 4 consisted of Shoshone County ana a portion of Benewah and Kootenai Counties.

Legislature	Session	Senate	House Seat A	House Seat B
52nd (1992 - 1994)	1st	Mary Lou Reed (D)	Lou Horvath (D)	Gino White (D)
52nd (1992 - 1994)	2nd	Mary Lou Reed (D)	Lou Horvath (D)	Gino White (D)
53rd (1994 - 1996)	1st	Mary Lou Reed (D)	Tom Dorr (R)	Don Pischner (R)
53rd (1994 - 1996)	2nd	Mary Lou Reed (D)	Tom Dorr (R)	Don Pischner (R)
54th (1996 - 1998)	1st	Jack Riggs (R)	Larry Watson (D)	Don Pischner (R)
54th (1996 - 1998)	2nd	Jack Riggs (R)	Larry Watson (D)	Don Pischner (R)
55th (1998 - 2000)	1st	Jack Riggs (R)	Larry Watson (D)	Don Pischner (R)
55th (1998 - 2000)	2nd	Jack Riggs (R)	Mary Lou Shepherd (D)	Don Pischner (R)
56th (2000 - 2002)	1st	Jack Riggs (R)	Mary Lou Shepherd (D)	Don Pischner (R)
56th (2000 - 2002)	2nd	Kathleen Sims (R)	Mary Lou Shepherd (D)	Don Pischner (R)

=== 2002–2012 ===
From 2002 to 2012, District 4 consisted of a portion of Kootenai County.

Legislature	Session	Senate	House Seat A	House Seat B
57th (2002 - 2004)	1st	John Goedde (R)	Bonnie Douglas (D)	George Sayler (D)
57th (2002 - 2004)	2nd	John Goedde (R)	Bonnie Douglas (D)	George Sayler (D)
58th (2004 - 2006)	1st	John Goedde (R)	Marge Chadderdon (R)	George Sayler (D)
58th (2004 - 2006)	2nd	John Goedde (R)	Marge Chadderdon (R)	George Sayler (D)
59th (2006 - 2008)	1st	John Goedde (R)	Marge Chadderdon (R)	George Sayler (D)
59th (2006 - 2008)	2nd	John Goedde (R)	Marge Chadderdon (R)	George Sayler (D)
60th (2008 - 2010)	1st	John Goedde (R)	Marge Chadderdon (R)	George Sayler (D)
60th (2008 - 2010)	2nd	John Goedde (R)	Marge Chadderdon (R)	George Sayler (D)
61st (2010 - 2012)	1st	John Goedde (R)	Marge Chadderdon (R)	Kathleen Sims (R)
61st (2010 - 2012)	2nd	John Goedde (R)	Marge Chadderdon (R)	Kathleen Sims (R)

=== 2012–2022 ===
District 4 currently consists of a portion of Kootenai County.

Legislature	Session	Senate	House Seat A	House Seat B
62nd (2012 - 2014)	1st	John Goedde (R)	Luke Malek (R)	Kathleen Sims (R)
62nd (2012 - 2014)	2nd	John Goedde (R)	Luke Malek (R)	Kathleen Sims (R)
63rd (2014 - 2016)	1st	Mary Souza (R)	Luke Malek (R)	Kathleen Sims (R)
63rd (2014 - 2016)	2nd	Mary Souza (R)	Luke Malek (R)	Kathleen Sims (R)
64th (2016 - 2018)	1st	Mary Souza (R)	Luke Malek (R)	Paul Amador (R)
64th (2016 - 2018)	2nd	Mary Souza (R)	Luke Malek (R)	Paul Amador (R)
65th (2018 - 2020)	1st	Mary Souza (R)	Jim Addis (R)	Paul Amador (R)
65th (2018 - 2020)	2nd	Mary Souza (R)	Jim Addis (R)	Paul Amador (R)
66th (2020 - 2022)	1st	Mary Souza (R)	Jim Addis (R)	Paul Amador (R)
66th (2020 - 2022)	2nd	Mary Souza (R)	Jim Addis (R)	Paul Amador (R)

=== 2022–present ===
In December 2022, District 4 will consist of a portion of Kootenai County.

== See also ==
- List of Idaho senators
- List of Idaho representatives
