= Wayne R. Meyer =

American politician and farmer from Idaho

Member of the Idaho House of Representatives from the District 2 seat B district
- In office December 1, 1994 – December 2002
- Preceded by: Wally Wright
- Succeeded by: Dick Harwood

Member of the Idaho House of Representatives from the District 3 seat B district
- In office December 1, 2002 – December 1, 2004
- Preceded by: Kris Ellis
- Succeeded by: Phil Hart

Personal details
- Born: May 27, 1949 Colfax, Washington
- Died: February 10, 2009 (aged 59)
- Party: Republican
- Spouse: Karleen Meyer
- Education: Washington State University
- Occupation: Farmer, politician

Wayne R. Meyer (1949 – 2009) is a former American politician and farmer from Idaho. Meyer was a Republican member of Idaho House of Representatives.

== Early life ==
On May 27, 1949, Meyer was born in Colfax, Washington. Meyer's parents were Richard and Helen Meyer.

== Education ==
In 1971, Meyer earned a Bachelor of Science degree in Agronomy from Washington State University.

== Career ==
Meyer was a farmer.

On November 8, 1994, Meyer won the election and became a Republican member of the Idaho House of Representatives for District 2 seat B. Meyer defeated Wally Wright with 62.2% of the votes. On November 5, 1996, as an incumbent, Meyer won the election and continued serving District 2 seat B. Meyer defeated Marc McGregor with 61.8% of the votes. On November 3, 1998, as an incumbent, Meyer won the election and continued serving District 2 seat B.

On November 5, 2002, Meyer won the election and became a Republican member of the Idaho House of Representatives from District 3 seat B. Meyer defeated Phil Harts with 68.3% of the votes.

On November 2, 2004, as an incumbent, Meyer lost the election for District 3 seat B. Meyer was defeated by Phil Hart with 91.0% of the votes. Meyer received 9.0% of the votes.

== Personal life ==
In 1970, Meyer married Karleen Penner. They have one child, Jamie Meyer. Meyer and his family live in Rathdrum, Idaho.

In 2005, Meyer was diagnosed with colo-rectal cancer. In 2006, Meyer completed chemotherapy.

On February 10, 2009, Meyer died from colon cancer in Idaho. Meyer was 59 years old.
