= Dick Harwood =

American politician (born 1947)

Member of the Idaho House of Representatives
- In office December 1, 2000 – December 1, 2012
- Preceded by: June Judd
- Succeeded by: Ed Morse (redistricting)
- Constituency: 7th district Seat B (2000–2002); 2nd district Seat B (2002–2012)

Personal details
- Born: October 4, 1947 (age 78) St. Maries, Idaho
- Party: Republican
- Education: North Idaho Junior College
- Occupation: Politician

Richard J. Harwood (born October 4, 1947 in St. Maries, Idaho) is an American politician, a Republican Idaho State Representative since 2002 representing District 2 in the B seat. Harwood served consecutively in the Idaho House of Representatives in 2001 and 2002 when the seat was in District 7. Harwood announced February 23, 2012, that he would not be seeking re-election.

== Education ==
Harwood graduated from St. Maries High School and earned his certification from North Idaho Junior College (later renamed North Idaho College).

== Elections ==
- 1998 Initially seeking the District 7 B seat, Harwood was unopposed for the May 26, 1998, Republican primary, and won with 2,286 votes, but lost the November 3, 1998, general election to incumbent Democratic Representative June E. Judd.
- 2000 Unopposed for the May 23, 2000, Republican primary, Harwood won with 3,273 votes; Judd was unopposed in the Democratic primary, setting up a rematch. Harwood won the three-party November 7, 2000, general election with 7,476 votes (54.0%) against Judd and Libertarian nominee Andy Jolliff.
- 2002 Redistricted to 2B, Harwood was unopposed for on May 28, 2002, Republican primary, winning with 1,794 votes; Judd won the Democratic primary, setting up their third contest. Harwood won the November 5, 2002, general election with 5,434 (50.8%) against Judd. and succeeding Wayne R. Meyer, who had been re-districted to 3B.
- 2004 Unopposed for the May 25, 2004, Republican primary, Harwood won with 1,724 votes, and won the November 2, 2004, general election with 8,345 votes (58.1%) against George Currier (D).
- 2006 Unopposed for the May 23, 2006, Republican primary, Harwood won with 1,924 votes, and won the November 7, 2006, general election with 5,978 votes (56.38%) against Richard Taniguchi (D).
- 2008 Unopposed for the May 27, 2008, Republican primary, Harwood won with 2,000 votes, and won the November 4, 2008, general election with 9,624 votes (63.7%) against C. J. Rose (D).
- 2010 Unopposed for the May 25, 2010, Republican primary, Harwood won with 2,973 votes, and won the November 2, 2010, general election with 8,006 votes (70.2%) against Jon Ruggles (D).
