= Lindsey McKeon =

American actress

- Born: March 11, 1982 (age 44); Summit, New Jersey, U.S.
- Years active: 1995–present
- Spouse: Brant Hively (m. 2014)

Lindsey McKeon (born March 11, 1982) is an American actress. She is known for her roles as Marah Lewis on Guiding Light and Taylor James on One Tree Hill. She previously starred on Saved by the Bell: The New Class as Katie Peterson from 1996–2000.

== Early life ==
McKeon was born March 11, 1982, in Summit, New Jersey.

== Career ==
McKeon starred on Saved by the Bell: The New Class, playing Katie Peterson, debuting with the series' fourth season in 1996 and continuing until the series ended in 2000. She joined the CBS daytime soap opera Guiding Light in November 2001, playing the character of Marah Lewis until 2004. In a June 2002 Victoria Advocate article, McKeon said of her character, Marah, "She could definitely make some smarter choices where men are concerned, but couldn't we all?" and "I just hope she's learned as much as I have after going through all of this."

McKeon has appeared as a series regular in Fox's The Opposite Sex and had a recurring role on Boy Meets World. Additional television credits include the lead in Class Warfare, a USA Network movie-of-the-week, and episodes of It's Always Sunny in Philadelphia, Grounded for Life, Maybe It's Me, Special Unit 2, 3rd Rock from the Sun, House, and Odd Man Out.

She also made guest appearances on the shows Supernatural and Veronica Mars, and on One Tree Hill as Taylor James, the sister of Haley James Scott played by fellow Guiding Light alumnus Bethany Joy Galeotti. Her film credits include Shredder and Class Warfare.

== Personal life ==
In the late 1990s, McKeon was involved with Scott Ashley Sterling (son of Donald Sterling). The day she broke up with Sterling, a fight ensued between him and his friend Philip Scheid, who Sterling thought was trying to steal Mckeon from him, resulting in Scheid being shot by Sterling with a shotgun.

She married Brant Hively in 2014 in a small intimate outdoor ceremony.

== Filmography ==
=== Film ===
Year	Title	Role	Notes
2003	Shredder	Kimberly Van Arx	
2005	Chastity	Chastity	
2008	What Doesn't Kill You	Nicole	
2009	The Jailhouse	Maddy	
2009	The Land That Time Forgot	Lindsey Stevens	Direct-to-video film
2010	Repo	Dominique	
2014	Indigenous	Steph	
2014	Guardian Angel	Darlene Simmons	
2014	Flock of Dudes	Deb	
2017	Women and Sometimes Men	Ali	
2020	The 420 Movie: Mary & Jane	Mary Hightower	

=== Television ===
Year	Title	Role	Notes
1995, 1998	Boy Meets World	Libby Harper	Episodes: "The Last Temptation of Cory", "First Girlfriends' Club"
1996–2000	Saved by the Bell: The New Class	Katie Peterson	Main role (seasons 4–7)
1999	Odd Man Out	Kendall	Episode: "The First Girlfriend's Club"
2000	3rd Rock from the Sun	Tiffany	Episode: "Dick Puts the 'Id' in Cupid"
2000	Opposite Sex	Stella	Main role
2001	Special Unit 2	Female Victim #1	Episode: "The Depths"
2001	Class Warfare	Kristen Marshall	Television movie
2001–2002	Maybe It's Me	Crystal	Episodes: "The Birthday Episode", "The Video Episode"
2002	Grounded for Life	Kelli	Episode: "Mr. Roboto"
2002	A Wedding Story: Josh and Reva	Marah Lewis (uncredited)	Television movie
2001–2004	Guiding Light	Marah Lewis	Main role
2005, 2010	One Tree Hill	Taylor James	Recurring role, 8 episodes
2005	CSI: Miami	Noelle	Episode: "Killer Date"
2005	It's Always Sunny in Philadelphia	Rebecca Keane	Episode: "The Gang Finds a Dead Guy"
2006–2014	Supernatural	Tessa the Reaper / Azazel	4 episodes
2006–2007	Veronica Mars	Trish	Episodes: "Wichita Linebacker", "Debasement Tapes"
2007	Cold Case	Diane Gilbert	Episode: "Blackout"
2007	Without a Trace	Sarah	Episode: "Deep Water"
2008	IQ-145	Beth Brody	Main role
2009	House	Franni	Episode: "Saviors"
2010	Airline Disaster	Gina Vitale	Television movie
2012	90210	Suzanne	Episode: "It's All Fun and Games"
2013	Necessary Roughness	Marcy	Episode: "Gimme Some Lovin'"
2014	That GPS Cray	Vivian	Television short
2014	Drop Dead Diva	Reesa	Episode: "First Date"
2015	NCIS	Taylor Matthews	Episode: "Day in Court"
2016	Girlfriends of Christmas Past	Murphy McCall	Television movie
2017	Training Day	Jen Mitchell	Episode: Pilot
2018	Space Diner Tales	Stella	Unsold television pilot
2020	Psycho Party Planner	Kayla Anderson	Television movie; also known as The Party Planner
