= Paul Amador =

American politician from Idaho

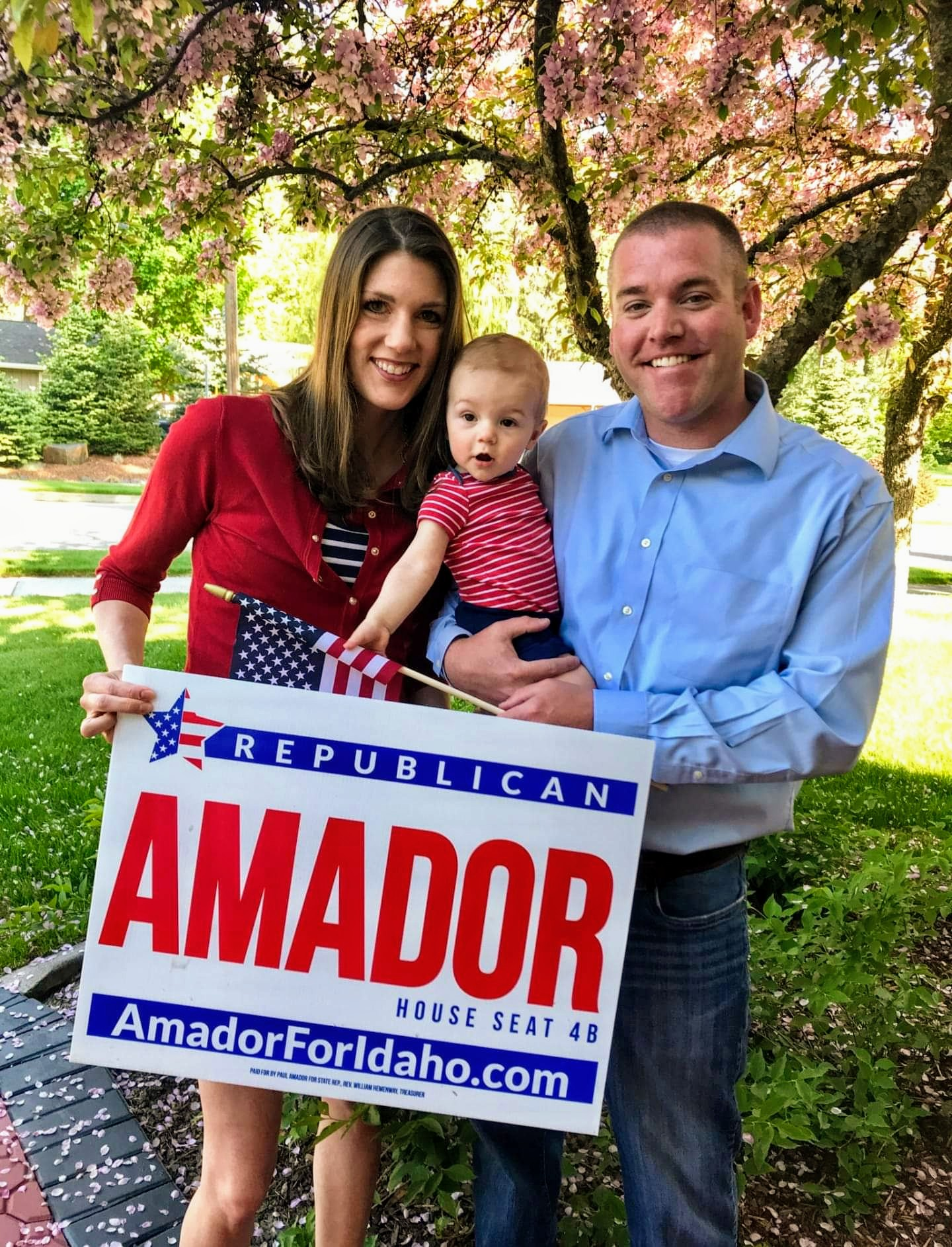
- Amador with his wife Julie and son Peter.

Member of the Idaho House of Representatives from District 4 Seat B
- In office December 1, 2016 – November 30, 2022
- Preceded by: Kathleen Sims
- Succeeded by: Elaine Price

Personal details
- Party: Republican
- Spouse: Julie
- Children: 2
- Education: University of Nevada (MA, PhD); California State University, Fresno (BS)
- Profession: Consultant
- Website: www.amadorforidaho.com

Paul Amador is an American politician and a former Republican member of the Idaho House of Representatives. First elected in 2016, he represented District 4 (seat B), which includes the city of Coeur d'Alene, Idaho, and a small portion of Kootenai County, Idaho. Paul served as chair of the Ways and Means Committee. Paul is seeking re-election to the Idaho House of Representatives, Seat 4B.

Prior to his three terms in the Idaho House of Representatives, Amador spent most of his career as an administrator at colleges and universities throughout the United States, most recently employed by University of Idaho. Amador currently owns and operates an educational and data management consulting business with his wife.

== Education ==
Amador attended the University of Nevada where he earned a Master of Arts and doctorate in educational leadership. Amador's graduate research focused on both K-12 and higher education-related issues, including public school finance, tuition policy, and educational technology. Amador attended California State University, Fresno, where he earned a Bachelor of Science in agricultural economics.

== Idaho House of Representatives ==
=== Legislative agenda ===
Amador has been actively involved in education-related issue during his service in the Idaho legislature and worked to improve the educational opportunities in Idaho, serving on the House education committee during his first term of office and then as one of a handful of legislators responsible for crafting the K-12 and higher education budgets on the Joint Finance and Appropriations Committee.

== Elections ==
=== 2020 ===
Amador ran unopposed in the Republican Primary and the general election.

=== 2018 ===
Amador defeated Republican challenger Roger Garlock in the May 15, 2018 primary with 68.6% of the vote.

Amador defeated Democratic challenger Shem Hanks in the November 6, 2018 general election with 62.6% of the vote.

=== 2016 ===
Amador defeated Republican incumbent Kathleen Sims in the May 17, 2016 Primary with 51.62% of the vote.

Amador defeated Democratic candidate Tom Hearn in the General Election with 63.31% of the vote.

== Personal life ==
Paul married his wife, Julie, in 2005. They have two sons, Peter and Simon. Paul enjoys traveling, spending time outdoors, and being with his family.
