= Jim Hammond (Idaho politician) =

American politician from Idaho

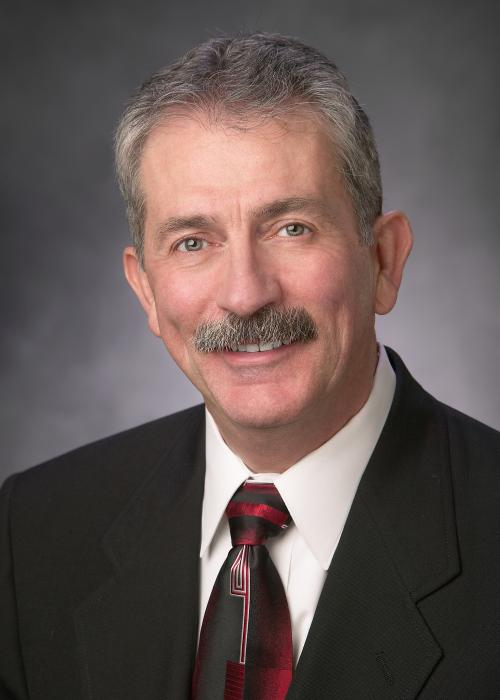
- Hammond in 2014

35th Mayor of Coeur d'Alene
- In office January 4, 2022 – August 31, 2024
- Preceded by: Steve Widmyer
- Succeeded by: Woody McEvers

Member of the Idaho Senate from the 5th district
- In office December 1, 2006 – November 30, 2012
- Preceded by: Dick Compton
- Succeeded by: Dan Schmidt (redistricting)

Mayor of Post Falls
- In office January 1996 – January 2006

Personal details
- Born: June 18, 1950 (age 76) Missoula, Montana
- Party: Republican
- Spouse: Cynthia Hammond
- Children: Sean Hammond, T.J. Hammond, Kurt Hammond
- Education: Carroll College; Whitworth College
- Profession: Consultant

James C. Hammond (born June 18, 1950) is a retired Idaho politician who was the 35th mayor of Coeur d'Alene and a former mayor of Post Falls. A member of the Republican Party, he served as an Idaho State Senator for the 5th District from 2006 to 2012.

== Early life and career ==
Hammond attended Carroll College, where he earned a Bachelor of Arts in Education in 1973. He later obtained a Master of Arts in Educational Administration from Whitworth College in 1977.

During his master's program, Hammond began his teaching career. From 1973 to 1996, he worked in three different school districts: Post Falls School District #273, Coeur d'Alene School District, and East Valley School District.

After leaving teaching, Hammond pursued a career in public service. He was appointed as the Post Falls City Administrator in 1996 and served in the role until 2006. In the course of his public service career, he also worked as a financial consultant with Hammond and Associates.

Throughout his career, Hammond served in multiple public offices, including mayor of two cities, a state senator, and a city council member.

While serving as a State Senator, he was a member of several committees, including Finance, Finance Appropriations, Health and Welfare, and Legislative Oversight. He also served as Chair of the Transportation Committee and as the Senate Representative for Idaho on the Interoperability Executive Council.

Since 1991, Hammond has held leadership positions in various organizations. He was a founding member of the Post Falls Education Foundation and served on the Post Falls Chamber Board of Directors and the Idaho State Board of Education. He also chaired the Idaho State Charter School Commission and served as Vice Chair of the Idaho State Building Authority. Additionally, he was a board member for organizations such as Catastrophic Health Care, United Way, Post Falls Community Volunteers, and the Panhandle Area Council. He also served as President of the Idaho City Managers Association.

== Elections ==
=== 2021 ===
Joe Alfieri, then a member of the Coeur d'Alene business community and now a member of the Idaho House of Representatives, ran against Hammond for Coeur d'Alene mayor. Hammond received 50.26% of the vote, while Alfieri, won 44.4%.

2021 Coeur d'Alene mayoral election
Candidate	Votes	%
Jim Hammond	5,627	50.26%
Joe Alfieri	4,975	44.44%
Michael Lentz	593	5.3%

=== 2010 ===
Hammond won the Republican primary with 50.6% of the vote in a three way race against John Green and Jack Schroeder. Hammond was unopposed in the general election.

=== 2008 ===
Hammond was unopposed in the Republican primary, and was unopposed in the general election.

=== 2006 ===
Hammond was unopposed in the Republican primary. Hammond defeated Democratic nominee Charles W. "Chuck" Thomas with 66.64% of the vote.

== Mayor of Coeur d'Alene ==
Hammond's tenure as Coeur d'Alene Mayor was focused on community engagement and opposing the far-right.

In June 2022, Coeur d'Alene and Kootenai County gained national attention when law enforcement arrested 31 men associated with the white nationalist group Patriot Front, who were plotting to riot at a Pride event. The arrests followed a tip from a local citizen who alerted authorities to suspicious activity, leading to the discovery of the group members in a U-Haul truck. All arrested individuals were convicted with conspiracy to riot, except for the group's leader, Thomas Rousseau. Hammond condemned and publicly addressed the event through several national news outlets, telling NPR, "We (Coeur d'Alene) are not going back to the days of the Aryan Nations."

In November 2023, Hammond was recognized for standing up to right-wing extremism, being named a "Pillar of Idaho."

In March 2024, during the NCAA basketball tournament, members of the University of Utah women's basketball team, while staying at the Coeur d'Alene Resort, were subjected to racial slurs, including the N-word, by individuals in vehicles as they walked along Sherman Avenue. Hammond condemned the incident and later expressed disappointment over the decision not to press charges, stating, "I had hoped that something could be done to hold them accountable... it was harmful in many different ways."

In June 2024, the Coeur d'Alene Tribe reported that Tribal School students were racially harassed at McEuen Park and called on community leaders to respond. That same day, Hammond issued a statement, saying, "We all need to stand up against any racist behavior."

In July 2024, Hammond announced his resignation as mayor, effective August 31, 2024, citing health concerns and a desire to spend more time with his wife and grandchildren. At 74, he expressed regret over not completing his four-year term.

== Personal life ==
Hammond is married to Cynthia Hammond and has three children: Sean, T.J., and Kurt. Since his tenure as mayor, Hammond has relocated to Colorado to be closer to his extended family.
