= Scott Weinger =

American actor (born 1975)

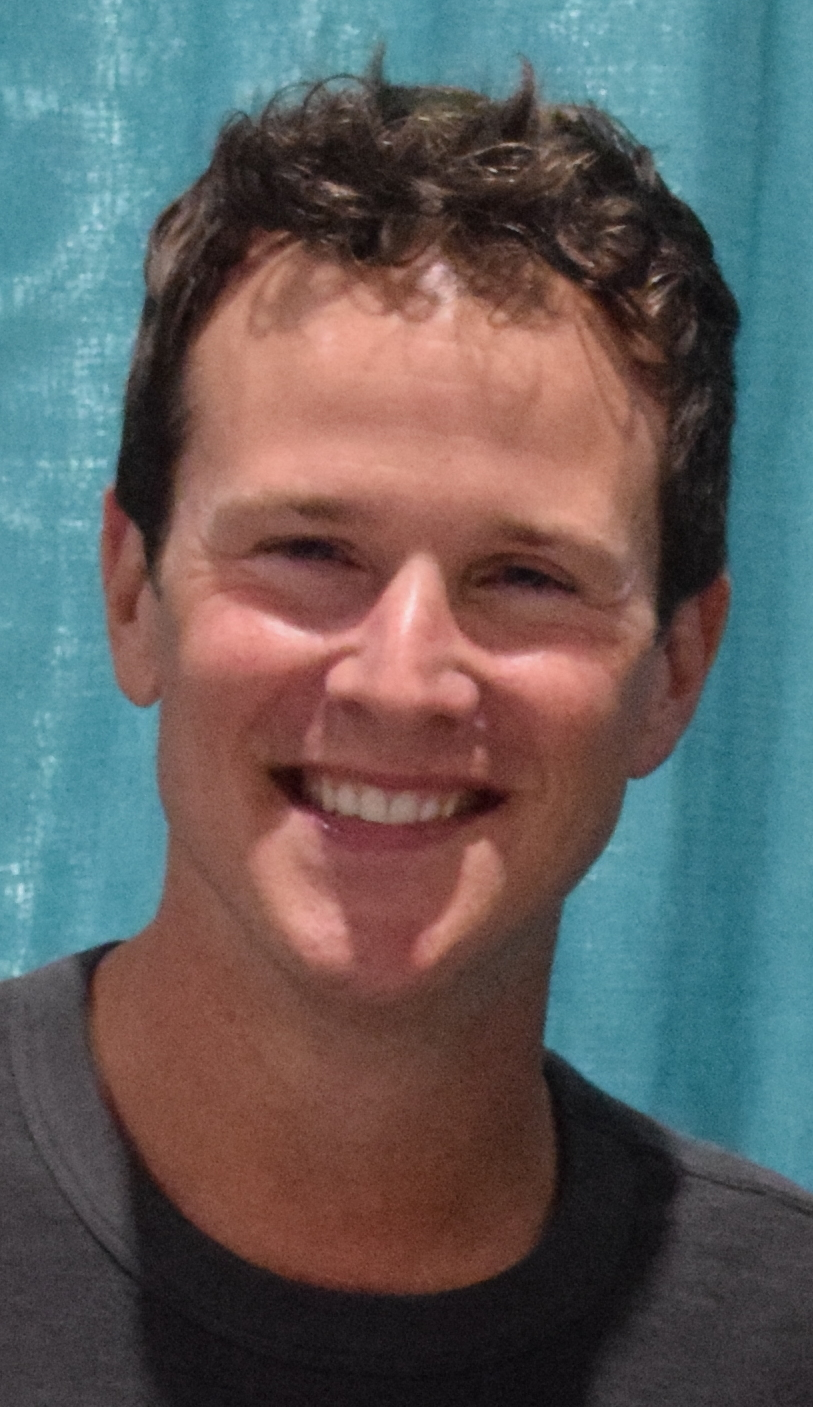
- Weinger at GalaxyCon Richmond in 2020
- Born: October 5, 1975 (age 50); New York City, New York, U.S.
- Education: Harvard University (BA)
- Occupations: Actor; screenwriter; producer
- Years active: 1988–present
- Spouse: Rina Mimoun (m. 2008)
- Children: 1

Scott Weinger (born October 5, 1975) is an American actor, screenwriter and television producer. He is the voice of the Disney character Aladdin in the 1992 animated film and various follow-ups, and played Steve Hale on the ABC sitcom Full House and its Netflix sequel Fuller House. For ABC, he wrote and produced for the television sitcoms Galavant and Black-ish and was a co-executive producer of The Muppets. He is a writer and co-executive producer on the Hulu show Paradise, for which he received Emmy nominations in 2025 and 2026.

== Early life ==
Weinger grew up in Hollywood, Florida before moving to Los Angeles when he got cast as a regular on Full House. Weinger graduated from Harvard University in 1998 magna cum laude with a degree in English and American Literature. He is Jewish.

== Career ==
Weinger's first professional acting work was a national commercial for Ideal Toys. His first acting role was in Police Academy 5: Assignment Miami Beach. After guest-starring on ABC's Life Goes On, Weinger became a series regular on the situation comedy The Family Man on CBS. His next regular role in a series came as Steve Hale on the sitcom Full House from 1991 to 1995 after he had guest-starred on one episode during its fifth season as the similarly named Steve Peters. During the run of Full House, Weinger made his motion-picture debut as the voice of Aladdin in Disney's 1992 animated feature of the same name.

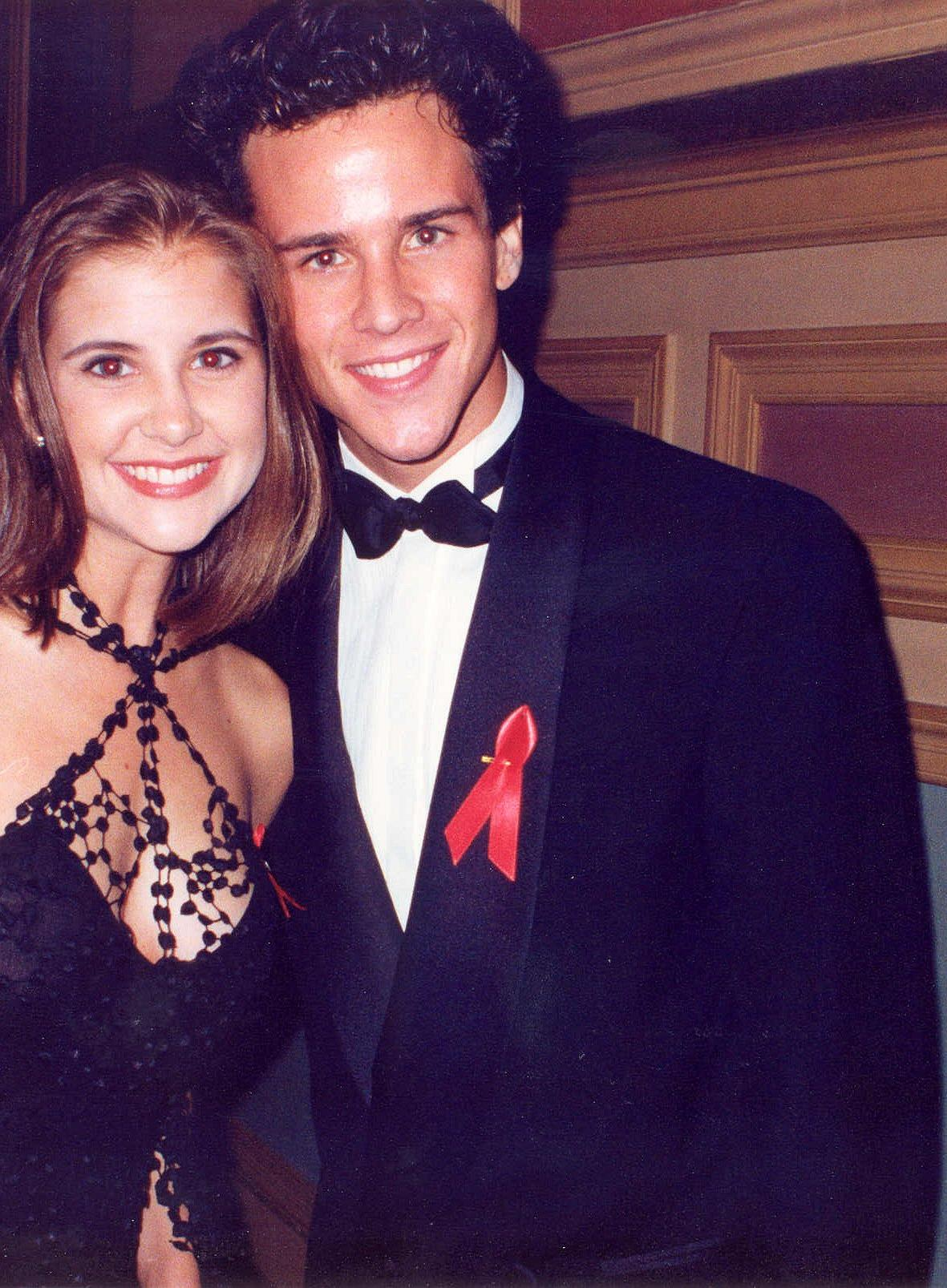
Weinger with Kellie Martin at the 45th Primetime Emmy Awards

Weinger went on to several small roles in television programs, starred in a horror comedy film, 2003's Shredder, and provided his voice for Osamu Tezuka's Metropolis and the 3D Disney film Mickey's PhilharMagic. He had a guest appearance on the NBC's Scrubs for the season 6 episode "My Coffee" as Dr. Kershnar. He played Officer Rubin on What I Like About You. From 2016 until 2020, Weinger reprised his role of Steve Hale on the Full House spin-off series Fuller House.

Weinger provided the voice for Aladdin, the street urchin in Walt Disney Pictures' animated feature film of the same name. He reprised his role multiple times off the big screen including the CBS television series and direct-to-video sequels The Return of Jafar and Aladdin and the King of Thieves. His voice would also be used for several video games including the Kingdom Hearts series, Kinect: Disneyland Adventures, and Disney Infinity series.

Weinger has written and produced for television, receiving his first writing credit on the WB television show Like Family. Other writing credits include What I Like About You and Privileged. From 2009 to 2013, he was a writer-producer for 90210. He later worked as a writer-producer for The Neighbors, Galavant, Black-ish, and The Muppets. Weinger was a co-executive producer and showrunner for the French-language Netflix romantic comedy series Plan Coeur (The Hookup Plan). During the run of Fuller House, he sold pilots to Fox, CBS, HBO Max, and Disney Plus.

Weinger is co-executive producer on Hulu's drama series Paradise. He wrote the series' fourth episode, titled "Agent Billy Pace". The series earned him multiple Emmy nominations for Outstanding Drama Series.

== Personal life ==
Weinger has been married to television writer and producer Rina Mimoun since 2008; together they have a son who was born in 2009.

== Filmography ==
=== Film ===
Year	Title	Role	Notes
1988	Police Academy 5: Assignment Miami Beach	Shark Attack Kid	
1992	Aladdin	Aladdin (voice)	
1994	The Return of Jafar	Aladdin (voice)	Direct-to-video
1996	Aladdin and the King of Thieves	Aladdin (voice)	Direct-to-video
2001	Metropolis	Atlas (voice)	English dub
2002	Mickey's House of Villains	Aladdin (voice)	
2003	Shredder	Cole Davidson	
2005	Jasmine's Enchanted Tales: Journey of a Princess	Aladdin (voice)	Direct-to-video
2006	Farce of the Penguins	Horny penguin (voice)	Direct-to-video
2011	Roulette	Mike	
2023	Once Upon a Studio	Aladdin (voice)	Short film

=== Television ===
Year	Title	Role	Notes
1988	Hemingway	Patrick Hemingway	Miniseries
1989–1990	Life Goes On	Steve Smith	2 episodes
1990–1991	The Family Man	Steve Taylor	22 episodes
1991	Eerie, Indiana	Eddie	Episode: "ATM with a Heart of Gold"
1991–1995	Full House	Steve Hale	Recurring role (season 5 and 8), main role (season 6–7)
1993	Where in the World Is Carmen Sandiego?	Himself	Episode: "The Pied Pirates of Petra"
1994	The Shaggy Dog	Wilbert "Wilby" Daniels	TV movie
1994–1995	Aladdin	Aladdin / Evil Aladdin (voices)	85 episodes
1995	Aladdin on Ice	Aladdin (voice)	TV movie
1999	Hercules	Aladdin (voice)	Episode: "Hercules and the Arabian Night"
1999	Walker, Texas Ranger	Bradley Roberts	Episode: "Full Recovery"
2001–2002	House of Mouse	Aladdin (voice)	3 episodes
2006	What I Like About You	Officer Rubin	4 episodes
2006	Scrubs	Dr. Kershnar	Episode: "My Coffee"
2013	The Mistresses	Father	Episode: "I Choose You"
2014	The Neighbors	Man	Episode: "There Goes The Neighbors' Hood"
2016–2020	Fuller House	Dr. Steve Hale	Recurring role (season 1); main role (season 2–5)

=== Video games ===
Year	Title	Role
1997	Aladdin's MathQuest	Aladdin
2001	Aladdin in Nasira's Revenge	Aladdin
2002	Kingdom Hearts	Aladdin (English version)
2005	Kingdom Hearts II	Aladdin (English version)
2011	Kinect: Disneyland Adventures	Aladdin
2013	Kingdom Hearts HD 1.5 ReMIX	Aladdin
2014	Kingdom Hearts HD 2.5 ReMIX	Aladdin
2014	Disney Infinity 2.0	Aladdin
2015	Disney Infinity 3.0	Aladdin
2022	Cookie Run: Kingdom	Aladdin

== Production credits ==
=== Writer ===
Year	Title	Notes
2003	Like Family	
2005	What I Like About You	3 episodes
2008–2009	Privileged	2 episodes
2010–2013	90210	8 episodes
2013–2014	The Neighbors	3 episodes
2014–2015	Black-ish	1 episode
2015–2016	Galavant	2 episodes
2016	The Muppets	1 episode
2018	The Hook Up Plan	4 episodes
2025–present	Paradise	2 episodes
TBD	DC Super Hero High	2 episodes

=== Producer ===
Year	Title	Position	Notes
2002	The Cricket Player		
2011–2012	90210	Co-producer	45 episodes
2013–2014	The Neighbors		22 episodes
2014–2015	Black-ish	Supervising producer	15 episodes
2015–2016	Galavant	Supervising producer	12 episodes
2016	The Muppets	Co-executive producer	5 episodes
2018	The Hookup Plan	Co-executive producer	8 episodes
2018	Génération Q	Co-executive producer	1 episode
2021	DC Super Hero High	Executive producer	1 episode
2025–present	Paradise	Co-executive producer	15 episodes
