= Peter Riggs =

American politician and businessman (born 1979)

Member of the Idaho Senate
- In office December 1, 2020 – November 30, 2022
- Preceded by: Don Cheatham
- Succeeded by: Doug Okuniewicz (redistricting)

Personal details
- Born: August 17, 1979 (age 46) Kootenai County, Idaho, U.S.
- Party: Republican
- Parent: Jack Riggs (father)
- Education: University of Idaho (BFA, MBA)

Peter Riggs (born August 17, 1979) is an American politician and businessman serving as a member of the Idaho Senate from the 3rd district. Elected in November 2020, he assumed office on December 1, 2020.

== Early life and education ==
Riggs was born and raised in Kootenai County, Idaho, the son of politician and physician Jack Riggs. After graduating from Lake City High School, he earned a Bachelor of Fine Arts in musical theatre and Master of Business Administration from the University of Idaho.

== Career ==
In 2001, Riggs appeared in the horror film Shredder. In 2005, he executive produced and starred in Roulette.

In 2003, Riggs became a Pita Pit franchisee. After his father, Jack Riggs, purchased the company, Pete became vice president of brand promotion, president, and president and CEO of the organization's U.S.-based operations. Riggs left the company in December 2018 and became the chief strategy officer of KORE Power, a renewable energy company.

In the 2020 election for the 3rd district of the Idaho Senate, Riggs placed first in a field of three candidates in the Republican primary. He did not face a Democratic opponent in the November general election. Riggs was sworn in on December 1, 2020.

== Personal life ==
Riggs and his wife, Tyree, have two sons.

== Filmography ==
Year	Title	Role	Notes
2001	Shredder	Kirk	
2005	Roulette	Pete	Also executive producer
2012	Fox & Friends	Himself	1 episode
