= John Goedde =

American politician (born 1949)

Member of the Idaho Senate from District 4
- In office December 1, 2002 – December 1, 2014
- Preceded by: Kathleen Sims
- Succeeded by: Mary Souza

Member of the Idaho Senate from District 3
- In office December 1, 2000 – December 1, 2002
- Preceded by: Gordon Crow
- Succeeded by: Kent Bailey

Personal details
- Born: May 20, 1949 (age 77) Chelan, Washington
- Party: Republican
- Spouse: Terri
- Profession: President, Panhandle Insurance Agency, Inc.

John W. Goedde (born May 20, 1949) was born in Chelan, Washington. He was a member of the Idaho Senate from 2002-2014 representing District 4, he previously served in District 3 from 2000-2002. He is married to Terri and is a father to two: Melissa (deceased) and one stepson.

== Education and career ==
Goedde attended Washington State University and received his BA in 1972. From 1973 to 1979, he was manager of Hayden Lake Country Club. From 1979 to 1983, he was an agent at Panhandle Insurance and Realty. He has been President of Panhandle Insurance Agency since 1983.

In 1997, Goedde was School Board Trustee at Coeur d'Alene School District #271 for three years.

In May 2014 John Goedde was defeated in the Republican primary to Mary Souza only getting 46.1% of the vote.

=== Education Committee ===
As the chair of the Education Committee of the Idaho Senate, Goedde introduced legislation in February 2013 that would require all Idaho high school students to read objectivist Ayn Rand's Atlas Shrugged. Students would also be required to pass an exam on the book in order to graduate. Goedde said that he didn't intend to schedule a hearing for the bill, which he referred to as a "shot across the bow" of the Idaho State Board of Education whose decisions he disagreed with.

== Committees ==
He is a member of:

- Commerce and Human Resources
- Chairman of Education
- Commissioner of Education Commission of the States
- Vice Chairman of National Conference of State Legislatures Education Committee
- Board of Directors of State Insurance Fund 2001-2014
- State Board of Education Oversight Accountability - retired 2021
- IPRAC
- Co-Chairman of Economic Outlook and Revenue Assessment
- Director of State Insurance Fund since 2001
- Co-Chairman of Inland Pacific Hub Committee
- Idaho Digital Learning Academy Task Force 2010 - 2014.

== Awards ==
- Ed Abbott Award Winner
