= Steve Parker (defensive end, born 1956) =

American football player

No. 96
- Position: Defensive end

Personal information
- Born: December 8, 1956 (age 69); Spokane, Washington, U.S.
- Listed height: 6 ft 6 in (1.98 m)
- Listed weight: 265 lb (120 kg)

Career information
- High school: Coeur d'Alene (Coeur d'Alene, Idaho)
- College: Washington (1976); North Idaho (1977); Idaho (1978–1979)
- NFL draft: 1980: undrafted

Career history
- New Orleans Saints (1980); Chicago Bears (1981)*; Cleveland Browns (1982)*
- * Offseason or practice squad member only

Career NFL statistics
- Sacks: 1
- Stats at Pro Football Reference

Steven Franklin Parker (born December 8, 1956) is an American former professional football player who was a defensive end for one season with the New Orleans Saints of the National Football League (NFL). He played college football for the University of Washington, North Idaho College, and the University of Idaho.

== Early life and college ==
Steven Franklin Parker was born on December 8, 1956, in Spokane, Washington. He attended Coeur d'Alene High School in Coeur d'Alene, Idaho.

Parker first played college football for the Washington Huskies of the University of Washington in 1976. He then played at North Idaho College in 1977. He transferred to play for the Idaho Vandals of the University of Idaho from 1978 to 1979 and was a letterman in 1979.

== Professional career ==
Parker signed with the New Orleans Saints on May 20, 1980, after going undrafted in the 1980 NFL draft. He was placed on injured reserve on August 19. He was released on November 26 but re-signed two days later. Parker then played in four games, starting one, for the Saints during the 1980 season and recorded one sack. He was waived on July 30, 1981.

Parker was claimed off waivers by the Chicago Bears on July 31, 1981. He was waived by the Bears on August 17, 1981.

Parker signed with the Cleveland Browns on March 2, 1982, but was later released.
