= Kathleen Sims =

American politician (1942–2019)

Member of the Idaho House of Representatives from District 4 Seat B
- In office December 1, 2010 – December 1, 2016
- Preceded by: George Sayler
- Succeeded by: Paul Amador

Member of the Idaho Senate from District 4
- In office February 2001 – December 1, 2002
- Preceded by: Jack Riggs
- Succeeded by: John Goedde

Personal details
- Born: June 6, 1942 Spokane, Washington
- Died: July 5, 2019 (aged 77)
- Party: Republican
- Spouse: Emilio Sims
- Education: North Idaho Junior College
- Profession: Teacher at St. Monica Catholic School

Kathleen Sims (June 6, 1942 – July 5, 2019) was an American politician. She served as a Republican Idaho State Representative for District 4 in the B seat for 2010 to 2016. She was previously appointed as the Idaho State Senator for District 4 to fill the vacancy when Jack Riggs resigned to serve as lieutenant governor; Sims served from 2000 until 2002.

== Early life and career ==
Sims was born in Spokane, Washington. She graduated from North Idaho Junior College with a degree in accounting. Sims owned the Honda Auto and Motorcycle dealership in Coeur d'Alene, Idaho.

== Elections and legislative service ==
At the Idaho Republican Party Convention held at Nampa, Idaho June 2016 Sims along with Blackfoot sheepherder Mike Duff lost against incumbent Steve Yates for State Chair of the party.

=== Idaho House of Representatives District 4 Seat B ===
==== 2016 ====
Sims lost the Republican primary election to Paul Amador, 48.4% to 51.6%.

==== 2012 ====
Sims was unopposed in the Republican Primary.

She defeated Democratic challenger Anne L. Nesse in the November 6, 2012, general election, 56.76% to 43.24%.

==== 2010 ====
Sims sought the open District 4B seat vacated by retiring Democratic Representative George C. Sayler She was unopposed in the May 25, 2010, Republican primary and won with 2,720 votes. Sims won the November 2, 2010, general election with 7,242 votes (58.1%) against Paula Marano (D).

=== Idaho Senate District 4 ===
==== 2002 ====
Due to redistricting, Sims faced fellow Republican Senator John W. Goedde in the May 28, 2002, primary, losing by 31 votes.

==== 2000 ====
Sims was appointed to fill the vacancy after Senator Jack Riggs resigned to fill the vacancy made by Lieutenant Governor Butch Otter, who won election to the U.S. House of Representatives for Idaho's 1st congressional district.
