= John Green (Idaho politician) =

American politician, attorney, and police officer

Member of the Idaho House of Representatives
- In office December 1, 2018 – January 16, 2020
- Preceded by: Eric Redman
- Succeeded by: Tim Remington
- Constituency: 2nd district Seat B

Personal details
- Born: February 23, 1959 (age 67) Brooklyn, New York, U.S.
- Party: Republican
- Spouse: Elizabeth Green
- Children: 4
- Education: University of Houston (BS); South Texas College of Law (JD)
- Occupation: Attorney, Deputy sheriff, politician

John Green is an American politician, attorney, and former deputy sheriff. Green was elected in 2018 as a Republican member of the Idaho House of Representatives from Legislative District 2, Seat B. On January 15, 2020, Green was convicted by a jury in Texas of conspiracy to defraud the United States, a charge that stemmed from helping a wealthy Texas couple hide assets to avoid paying income taxes when Green worked as an attorney there.

Because convicted felons are disqualified from serving in the Idaho Legislature, Green was formally expelled from the legislature on January 16, 2020. He was the first Idaho legislator to ever be expelled.

== Early life and education ==
On February 23, 1959, Green was born in Brooklyn, New York.

In 1977, Green graduated from Texas A&M University's Police Academy. In 1982, Green earned a Bachelor of Science degree in Criminal Justice from the University of Houston. In 1986, Green earned a juris doctor degree from South Texas College of Law.

== Career ==
=== Texas ===
In 1978, Green started his career as a police officer and a deputy sheriff with Harris County Sheriff's Office in Texas, until 1986.

Green was a criminal justice instructor at the University of Houston and San Jacinto College.

In 1993, Green became an attorney and was made General Counsel and Chief Law Enforcement Advisor for the Bill of Rights Institute.

=== Idaho ===
in 2010, Green along with Jack Schroeder ran against incumbent Jim Hammond in the Republican primary, losing with only 37.4% of the vote.

In 2012, Green sought election as Sheriff of Kootenai County, Idaho, but was defeated by incumbent Ben Wolfinger.

In 2018, Green sought election as a state representative in Idaho, even though he was being tried in Texas on felony charges of conspiracy to defraud the United States government for hiding tax funds of other individuals. On November 6, 2018, Green won the election and became a Republican member of Idaho House of Representatives for District 2, Seat B, defeating Alanna Brooks with 75.1% of the vote. In the midst of the trial, Tim Remington had served in his stead in the legislature.

Green was found guilty of conspiracy, and was subsequently expelled from the Idaho legislature.

He was also found guilty of tax evasion, because according to federal prosecutors he had not filed his own taxes in two decades. He was sentenced to 6 months in prison followed by 3 years on probation, and was fined US$679,501.50.

== Personal life ==
Green and his wife Elizabeth Green live in Rathdrum, Idaho, with their four children.
