= Ed Morse =

American politician from Idaho

Member of the Idaho House of Representatives
- In office December 1, 2012 – November 30, 2014
- Preceded by: Dick Harwood (redistricting)
- Succeeded by: Eric Redman
- Constituency: 2nd district Seat B

Personal details
- Born: Prosser, Washington
- Party: Republican
- Education: University of Idaho; Gonzaga University School of Law
- Occupation: Politician

Ed Morse is a Hayden Idaho businessman and real estate consultant. He hold BS and MBA degrees from the University of Idaho, and graduated from Gonzaga University Law school, cum laude. He has a real estate valuation practice. He invests in and develops real estate. He served on the Idaho Real Estate Appraisal Board, and the Appraisal Qualification Board of the Appraisal Foundation, which he chaired. He served in the Republican Idaho State Representative from 2012 to 2014.

== Early life, education, and career ==
Morse earned a Bachelor of Science and Master of Business Administration from University of Idaho and a Juris Doctor from Gonzaga University School of Law.

== Idaho House of Representatives ==
In 2012, after redistricting, Morse challenged incumbent representative and tax protester Phil Hart in a four-way primary and won the Republican nomination and the general election. In 2014, Morse was challenged in the Republican primary and lost to Eric Redman.

=== Committee assignments ===
Morse served on the Business Committee, the Environment, Energy, and Technology Committee, and the Health and Welfare Committee from 2012 to 2014.

== Elections ==
District 2 Seat B - part of Kootenai County
Year	Candidate	Votes	Pct	Candidate	Votes	Pct	Candidate	Votes	Pct	Candidate	Votes	Pct
2012 Primary	Ed Morse	1,984	35.4%	Phil Hart (incumbent)	1,746	31.2%	Ron Vieselmeyer	1,116	19.9%	Fritz Wiedenhoff	751	13.4%
2012 General	Ed Morse	13,555	63.3%	Dan English	7,868	36.7%						
2014 Primary	Ed Morse (incumbent)	1,849	39.0 %	Eric Redman	2,897	61.0%						
