= Charles Eberle =

American politician from Idaho

Member of the Idaho House of Representatives from the District 5, seat B district
- In office December 1, 2002 – December 1, 2004
- Preceded by: Gary F. Young
- Succeeded by: Frank Henderson

Personal details
- Born: February 2, 1942 (age 84) Akron, Ohio
- Party: Republican
- Spouse: Connie Eberle
- Education: University of California, Santa Barbara
- Occupation: Politician

Charles Eberle is an American politician from Idaho. Eberle is a former Republican member of Idaho House of Representatives.

== Early life ==
On February 2, 1942, Eberle was born in Akron, Ohio.

== Education ==
Eberle earned a Bachelor of Science degree from University of California, Santa Barbara. Eberle earned a Master of Science degree from University of Southern California.

== Career ==
In 1964, Eberle served in the United States Navy, until 1967.

On November 5, 2002, Eberle won the election and became a Republican member of Idaho House of Representatives for District 5, seat B. Eberle defeated Lyndon Harriman and Don Pischner with 53.7% of the votes.

== Personal life ==
Eberle's wife is Connie Eberle. Eberle AZ and his family live in Post Falls, Idaho.
