= Tim Remington =

American pastor and politician from Idaho

Member of the Idaho House of Representatives
- In office January 28, 2020 – November 30, 2020
- Preceded by: John Green
- Succeeded by: Doug Okuniewicz
- Constituency: 2nd district Seat B

Personal details
- Born: California, U.S.
- Party: Republican
- Occupation: Pastor

Tim Remington is an American pastor and politician from Coeur d'Alene, Idaho.

== Biography ==
Remington was born in California but grew up in Coeur d'Alene. After high school, he returned to California where he found religion and, in 1981, was "radically saved." By 2001, he was operating a church and substance abuse rehabilitation program in Cataldo, Idaho. By 2015, he was affiliated with The Altar Church in Coeur d'Alene. Remington spoke at a rally for Ted Cruz's 2016 presidential campaign.

=== 2016 shooting ===
On March 6, 2016, Kyle Odom, an individual fixated with alien conspiracy theories, shot Remington six times in the back and once in the head at The Altar Church in Coeur d'Alene. Believing that Remington was hiding shapeshifting extraterrestrials within his congregation, on March 6, 2016, Odom approached Remington in the parking lot of the church and fired at him six times with a .45-caliber pistol in an apparent attempt on his life. Despite plans to kill outreach pastor John Padula, Odom left the scene without any further incident. Remington survived and underwent several hours of surgery. Odom mailed a manifesto to his family and media outlets, expressing his intent to murder Remington and his belief that he was part of an alien conspiracy to enslave humanity.

Police found his vehicle at the scene of the crime. After successfully evading police, Odom boarded a flight to Washington, D.C. and approached the White House, at which point he began tossing items over the fence, including flash drives and a twenty-five-page manifesto addressed to then United States president Barack Obama. Odom was apprehended by United States Secret Service members at 8:27 p.m., though the arrest was related to his activity at the White House and not to the attempt on Remington's life. In July 2017, Odom pleaded guilty to aggravated battery with a felony firearm and was sentenced to twenty-five years in prison. He was released on parole in March 2026.

=== Subsequent career ===
As of January 2020, Remington was a pastor at Altar Church in Coeur d'Alene.

On January 28, 2020, Remington was appointed by Idaho Governor Brad Little as a Republican member of Idaho House of Representatives for District 2, seat B. Remington replaced John Green, who was expelled from the Idaho Legislature.
