= Kris Ellis =

American politician and businessman from Idaho

Member of the Idaho House of Representatives from the District 3 seat B district
- In office December 1, 2000 – December 1, 2002
- Preceded by: Jeff Alltus
- Succeeded by: Wayne R. Meyer

Personal details
- Born: April 3, 1963 (age 63) Corvallis, Oregon
- Party: Republican
- Spouse: Curtis Ellis
- Children: 2
- Education: Oregon State University
- Occupation: Businesswoman, lobbyist, and politician

Kris Ellis is an American businesswoman, lobbyist, and a former politician from Idaho. Ellis was a Republican member of Idaho House of Representatives.

== Early life ==
On April 3, 1963, Ellis was born in Corvallis, Oregon.

== Education ==
In 1985, Ellis earned a Bachelor of Science degree in business from Oregon State University.

== Career ==
In 1985, Ellis became a manager/director of Professional Food Service Management, until 1992. In 1992, as a business woman, Ellis became the owner of Idaho Ruby's Catering.

On November 7, 2000, Ellis won the election and became a Republican member of Idaho House of Representatives for District 3, seat B. Ellis defeated JoAnn Harvey with 56.9% of the votes.

On November 5, 2002, Ellis sought a seat in District 4, seat B unsuccessfully. Ellis was defeated by George Sayler with 48.7% of the votes. Ellis received 48.1% of the votes.

Ellis is a co-owner of a real estate and property management company in Boise, Idaho.

Ellis is a lobbyist and a partner with Eiguren Ellis, a public policy firm in Boise, Idaho.

== Personal life ==
Ellis's husband is Curtis Ellis. They have two children. Ellis and her family live in Coeur d'Alene, Idaho.
