= Doug Okuniewicz =

American politician

Member of the Idaho Senate from the 3rd district
- Incumbent
- Assumed office December 1, 2022
- Preceded by: Steve Vick (redistricting)

Member of the Idaho House of Representatives from District 2 Seat B
- In office December 1, 2020 – November 30, 2022
- Preceded by: Tim Remington
- Succeeded by: Dale Hawkins

Personal details
- Born: Phoenix, Arizona, U.S.
- Party: Republican
- Education: University of Nevada, Reno (BA); University of Alabama (MA)
- Committees: Chair - Senate Transportation; Senate Resources & Environment

Doug Okuniewicz is an American politician and businessman currently serving as a member of the Idaho Senate from the 3rd legislative district. Okuniewicz is Chairman of the Senate Transportation committee and also sits on the Senate Resources and Environment committee.

== Early life and education ==
Okuniewicz was born in Phoenix, Arizona. He earned a Bachelor of Arts degree from the University of Nevada, Reno, and a Master of Arts in communications from the University of Alabama.

== Career ==
Okuniewicz has worked for several corporations in the intellectual property, employee benefits, and non-profit sectors. He also holds more than 25 patents. He was originally elected to the Idaho House of Representatives in November 2020 and assumed office on December 1, 2020, succeeding Tim Remington. Okuniewicz was elected to the Idaho Senate in November 2022 and assumed office on December 1, 2022, succeeding Steve Vick, who did not run.
