= Don Cheatham =

American politician from Idaho

Member of the Idaho Senate from the 3rd district
- In office December 1, 2018 – December 1, 2020
- Preceded by: Bob Nonini
- Succeeded by: Peter Riggs

Member of the Idaho House of Representatives from District 3 Seat B
- In office December 1, 2014 – December 1, 2018
- Preceded by: Frank Henderson
- Succeeded by: Tony Wisniewski

Personal details
- Party: Republican
- Occupation: Politician
- Website: www.donforidaho.com

Military service
- Branch/service: United States Air Force

Don Cheatham is a Republican Idaho state senator representing District 3 since 2018. He previously served as the Idaho state representative from 2014-2018 representing District 3 in the B seat.

== Education and career ==
Cheatham has B.S. in criminal justice and a limited lifetime teaching credential. Cheatham is retired from the United States Department of Homeland Security where he served as a DHS Protective Security Advisor. In 2006, he was promoted to the regional director for the Southwestern U.S. His team of Security Advisors was dispersed throughout the region and was responsible for working with stakeholders to enhance the security of our nation's critical infrastructure and key resources.

He has also worked in the private sector for Bank of America in Corporate Security and was later promoted to Vice President and Regional Manager, where he worked in the Protective Services Division. In this capacity he has experience drafting multimillion-dollar budgets and addressing the security vulnerabilities for several states.

Cheatham also served nearly 25 years with the Los Angeles Police Department, including assignments in SWAT, as a detective supervisor in Organized Crime, Internal Affairs, Gangs, political corruption cases and the Anti-Terrorism Division where he was a member of the Los Angeles Task Force on Terrorism.

== Idaho House of Representatives ==
=== Committee assignments ===
2017 Session

Judiciary, Rules, & Administration

Local Government

State Affairs

== Idaho Senate ==
Cheatham was elected to the Idaho Senate in 2018, representing the 3rd district. He sits on the Judiciary & Rules and Local Government & Taxation committees.

== Elections ==
2020 Cheatham announced he would not seek reelection to the District 3 State Senate seat.

2018

Cheatham was unopposed in the Republican primary for the District 3 State Senate seat, and defeated Democrat Patrick Lippert in the general election with 72.2% of the vote.

2016

Cheatham won the Republican primary against Peter Riggs with 50.87% of the vote.

Cheatham was unopposed in the general election.

2014

Cheatham won the Republican primary against Jeff Ward and Greg Gfeller with 41.6% of the vote.

Cheatham was unopposed in the general election.
