= Frank Henderson (Idaho politician) =

American politician from Idaho

Member of the Idaho House of Representatives
- In office December 1, 2004 – November 30, 2014
- Preceded by: Charles Eberle
- Succeeded by: Don Cheatham
- Constituency: 5th district Seat B (2004–2012); 3rd district Seat B (2012–2014)

Personal details
- Born: December 6, 1922 Chicago, Illinois
- Died: April 27, 2015 (aged 92) Coeur d'Alene, Idaho
- Party: Republican
- Education: University of Idaho
- Profession: Marketing executive

Military service
- Branch/service: United States Army
- Unit: 33rd Infantry Division
- Battles/wars: World War II

Frank Henderson (December 6, 1922 – April 27, 2015) was a Republican Idaho State Representative from 2012 to 2014 representing District 3 in the B seat. He previously served in District 5 Seat B from 2004 to 2012. Henderson was the mayor of Post Falls, Idaho from 1980 to 1983 and Kootenai County commissioner from 1983 to 1991.

== Early life and career ==
Henderson graduated high school in Wisconsin and attended the University of Idaho. He was a soldier in the United States Army's 33rd Infantry Division during World War II.

== Elections ==
2012

Redistricted to 3B, Henderson won the Republican primary with 55.6% of the vote against Jack Schroeder.

Henderson defeated Democratic nominee Ronald K. Johnson in the general election with 70.1% of the vote.

2010

Henderson was unopposed in the Republican primary and the general election.

2008

Henderson was unopposed in the Republican primary and the general election.

2006

Henderson was unopposed in the Republican primary.

Henderson again defeated Democratic nominee Lyndon Harriman, this time with 65.54% of the vote.

2004

Henderson challenged incumbent Republican Representative Charles Eberle in the Republican primary, winning with 51.57% of the vote.

Henderson won the general election with 69.5% of the vote against Democratic nominee Lyndon Harriman.

1992

Henderson lost the District 2 senate seat race to Democratic Representative Barbara Chamberlain in the general election on November 3, 1992. Chamberlain held the seat from 1992 until 1996.

1990

Henderson lost the District 2 senate B seat race to Dennis Davis in the general election on November 6, 1990. Davis won the District 3 senate seat in the 1992 election and served in the senate from 1990 until 1994.

== Personal life ==
Henderson died on April 27, 2015, in Coeur d'Alene, Idaho.

Henderson's grandson is Nick Henderson, a politician in Idaho who ran for Idaho's 1st congressional district Idaho Republican Party primary in May 2018. Nick took 6th place with 2% of the vote.
