= Steve Vick =

American politician (born 1956)

Member of the Idaho Senate
- In office December 1, 2010 – November 30, 2022
- Preceded by: Mike Jorgenson
- Succeeded by: Phil Hart (redistricting)
- Constituency: 3rd district (2010–2012); 2nd district (2012–2022)

Member of the Montana House of Representatives from the 31st district
- In office January 2, 1995 – January 2002
- Succeeded by: John Sinrud

Personal details
- Born: May 23, 1956 (age 70) Great Falls, Montana, U.S.
- Party: Republican
- Spouse: Cheryl Ann
- Children: 2
- Education: Montana State University (BS)

Steve Vick (born May 23, 1956) is an American politician serving as a member of the Idaho Senate from the 2nd district. He was previously a member of the Montana House of Representatives from 1995 to 2002.

== Early life and education ==
Born in Great Falls, Montana, Vick attended Power High School in Power, Montana. In 1979, he earned a Bachelor of Science degree in engineering from Montana State University.

== Career ==
Vick's is a businessman in home construction and the remodeling business. Vick was also an engineer, farmer, and a real estate appraiser. In 1995, Vick's political career began as a member of Montana State House of representatives. Vick served four consecutive terms in the Montana House of Representatives until 2002.

=== Elections ===
District 3 Senate - Part of Kootenai County
Year	Candidate	Votes	Pct	Candidate	Votes	Pct
2010 Primary	Steve Vick	3,132	59.5%	Mike Jorgenson (incumbent)	2,132	40.5%
2010 General	Steve Vick	12,309	100%			

District 2 Senate - Part of Kootenai County
Year	Candidate	Votes	Pct	Candidate	Votes	Pct
2012 Primary	Steve Vick (incumbent)	3,487	61.8%	Mike Jorgenson	2,159	38.2%
2012 General	Steve Vick (incumbent)	14,871	69.0%	Shirley McFaddan	6,688	31.0%
2014 Primary	Steve Vick (incumbent)	4,173	100%			
2014 General	Steve Vick (incumbent)	11,646	100%			
2016 Primary	Steve Vick (incumbent)	4,267	100%			
2016 General	Steve Vick (incumbent)	20,240	100%			

=== Objection to Hindu invocation ===
On March 3, 2015, Vick (along with three other Idaho senators) refused to enter the Senate chamber during the daily invocation because the guest chaplain was Hindu. When originally questioned about his objection, Vick said, "They have a caste system. They worship cows."

=== Committees ===
Vick is a member of:

- Vice-Chairman Resources and Environment
- Local Government and Taxation
- Transportation
- Chairman of the Appropriations Committee, previously

== Memberships ==
- National Rifle Association of America (NRA)
- Idaho Farm Bureau
- Toastmasters.

== Personal life ==
Vick's wife is Cheryl Ann. They have four children.
