= Dalton Gardens, Idaho =

City in Kootenai County, Idaho, United States

- City
- Location of Dalton Gardens in Kootenai County, Idaho.

- Location in the United States
- Coordinates: 47°43′46″N 116°45′23″W
- Country: United States
- State: Idaho
- County: Kootenai

Government
  - Mayor: Curt Jernigan

Area
  - Total: 2.39 sq mi (6.18 km^{2})
  - Land: 2.38 sq mi (6.17 km^{2})
  - Water: 0.0039 sq mi (0.01 km^{2})
- Elevation: 2,261 ft (689 m)

Population (2020)
  - Total: 2,537
  - Density: 1,011.8/sq mi (390.67/km^{2})
- Time zone: UTC-8 (Pacific (PST))
  - Summer (DST): UTC-7 (PDT)
- ZIP code: 83815
- Area code: 208
- FIPS code: 16-20350
- GNIS feature ID: 2410289
- Website: daltongardens.com

Dalton Gardens is a city in Kootenai County, Idaho, United States. It is considered a suburb of Coeur d'Alene and borders the city to the north and east. The city of Dalton Gardens is also part of the larger Spokane-Coeur d'Alene Combined Metropolitan Statistical Area which encompasses Kootenai County, Idaho. As of the 2020 census, Dalton Gardens had a population of 2,537.

== Geography ==
According to the United States Census Bureau, the city has a total area of 2.32 square miles (6.01 km^{2}), all land.

== Demographics ==
Historical population
Census	Pop.	Note	%±
1960	1,083		—
1970	1,559		44.0%
1980	1,795		15.1%
1990	1,951		8.7%
2000	2,278		16.8%
2010	2,335		2.5%
2020	2,537		8.7%
2019 (est.)	2,410		3.2%
U.S. Decennial Census

=== 2020 census ===
As of the 2020 census, Dalton Gardens had a population of 2,537. The median age was 48.8 years. 21.8% of residents were under the age of 18 and 25.0% of residents were 65 years of age or older. For every 100 females there were 103.3 males, and for every 100 females age 18 and over there were 101.3 males age 18 and over.

100.0% of residents lived in urban areas, while 0.0% lived in rural areas.

There were 917 households in Dalton Gardens, of which 30.6% had children under the age of 18 living in them. Of all households, 72.3% were married-couple households, 10.8% were households with a male householder and no spouse or partner present, and 12.2% were households with a female householder and no spouse or partner present. About 13.9% of all households were made up of individuals and 8.9% had someone living alone who was 65 years of age or older.

There were 942 housing units, of which 2.7% were vacant. The homeowner vacancy rate was 0.4% and the rental vacancy rate was 0.0%.

Racial composition as of the 2020 census
Race	Number	Percent
White	2,326	91.7%
Black or African American	7	0.3%
American Indian and Alaska Native	11	0.4%
Asian	9	0.4%
Native Hawaiian and Other Pacific Islander	3	0.1%
Some other race	30	1.2%
Two or more races	151	6.0%
Hispanic or Latino (of any race)	102	4.0%

=== 2010 census ===
As of the census of 2010, there were 2,335 people, 883 households, and 689 families residing in the city. The population density was 1,006.5 inhabitants per square mile (388.6/km^{2}). There were 917 housing units at an average density of 395.3 units per square mile (152.6 units/km^{2}). The racial makeup of the city was 96.8% White, 0.2% African American, 0.6% Native American, 0.4% Asian, 0.1% Pacific Islander, 0.6% from other races, and 1.3% from two or more races. Hispanic or Latino of any race were 3.2% of the population.

There were 883 households, of which 29.7% had children under the age of 18 living with them, 68.0% were married couples living together, 6.1% had a female householder with no husband present, 4.0% had a male householder with no wife present, and 22.0% were non-families. 17.7% of all households were made up of individuals, and 9.9% had someone living alone who was 65 years of age or older. The average household size was 2.64 and the average family size was 2.99.

The median age in the city was 48 years. 23.6% of residents were under the age of 18; 6.1% were between the ages of 18 and 24; 16.3% were from 25 to 44; 34.5% were from 45 to 64; and 19.4% were 65 years of age or older. The gender makeup of the city was 50.7% male and 49.3% female.

=== 2000 census ===
As of the census of 2000, there were 2,278 people, 833 households, and 684 families residing in the city. The population density was 955.8 inhabitants per square mile (369.0/km^{2}). There were 858 housing units at an average density of 360.0 units per square mile (139.0 units/km^{2}). The racial makeup of the city was 97.41% White, 0.04% African American, 0.53% Native American, 0.04% Asian, 0.13% Pacific Islander, 0.48% from other races, and 1.36% from two or more races. Hispanic or Latino of any race were 1.98% of the population.

There were 833 households, out of which 31.9% had children under the age of 18 living with them, 72.5% were married couples living together, 6.1% had a female householder with no husband present, and 17.8% were non-families. 15.4% of all households were made up of individuals, and 8.2% had someone living alone who was 65 years of age or older. The average household size was 2.73 and the average family size was 3.04.

In the city, the population was spread out, with 25.7% under the age of 18, 6.1% from 18 to 24, 21.7% from 25 to 44, 31.4% from 45 to 64, and 15.1% who were 65 years of age or older. The median age was 43 years. For every 100 females, there were 103.0 males. For every 100 females age 18 and over, there were 98.9 males.

The median income for a household in the city was $44,559, and the median income for a family was $47,083. Males had a median income of $41,696 versus $23,319 for females. The per capita income for the city was $21,521. About 3.3% of families and 3.4% of the population were below the poverty line, including 4.2% of those under age 18 and 1.3% of those age 65 or over.

== See also ==
- List of cities in Idaho
