= Idaho's 6th legislative district =

American legislative district

Idaho's 6th legislative district is one of 35 districts of the Idaho Legislature. It currently comprises Latah and Lewis counties, as well as part of Nez Perce County.

It is currently represented by State Senator Dan Foreman, Republican of Illinois and later, Moscow as well as state representatives Lori McCann, Republican of Lewiston and Brandon Mitchell, Republican of Moscow.

== District profile ==
=== 1992–2002 ===
From 1992 to 2002, District 6 consisted of a portion of Nez Perce County.

Legislature	Session	Senate	House Seat A	House Seat B
52nd (1992 - 1994)	1st	Bruce Sweeney (D)	Paul Keeton (D)	Dan Mader (R)
52nd (1992 - 1994)	2nd	Bruce Sweeney (D)	Paul Keeton (D)	Dan Mader (R)
53rd (1994 - 1996)	1st	Bruce Sweeney (D)	Frank Bruneel (R)	Dan Mader (R)
53rd (1994 - 1996)	2nd	Bruce Sweeney (D)	Frank Bruneel (R)	Dan Mader (R)
54th (1996 - 1998)	1st	Bruce Sweeney (D)	Frank Bruneel (R)	Dan Mader (R)
54th (1996 - 1998)	2nd	Bruce Sweeney (D)	Frank Bruneel (R)	Dan Mader (R)
55th (1998 - 2000)	1st	Joe Stegner (R)	Frank Bruneel (R)	Dan Mader (R)
55th (1998 - 2000)	2nd	Joe Stegner (R)	Frank Bruneel (R)	Dan Mader (R)
56th (2000 - 2002)	1st	Joe Stegner (R)	Frank Bruneel (R)	Dan Mader (R)
56th (2000 - 2002)	2nd	Joe Stegner (R)	Frank Bruneel (R)	Dan Mader (R)

=== 2002–2012 ===
From 2002 to 2012, District 6 consisted of Latah County.

Legislature	Session	Senate	House Seat A	House Seat B
57th (2002 - 2004)	1st	Gary Schroeder (R)	Tom Trail (R)	Shirley Ringo (D)
57th (2002 - 2004)	2nd	Gary Schroeder (R)	Tom Trail (R)	Shirley Ringo (D)
58th (2004 - 2006)	1st	Gary Schroeder (R)	Tom Trail (R)	Shirley Ringo (D)
58th (2004 - 2006)	2nd	Gary Schroeder (R)	Tom Trail (R)	Shirley Ringo (D)
59th (2006 - 2008)	1st	Gary Schroeder (R)	Tom Trail (R)	Shirley Ringo (D)
59th (2006 - 2008)	2nd	Gary Schroeder (R)	Tom Trail (R)	Shirley Ringo (D)
60th (2008 - 2010)	1st	Gary Schroeder (R)	Tom Trail (R)	Shirley Ringo (D)
60th (2008 - 2010)	2nd	Gary Schroeder (R)	Tom Trail (R)	Shirley Ringo (D)
61st (2010 - 2012)	1st	Dan Schmidt (D)	Tom Trail (R)	Shirley Ringo (D)
61st (2010 - 2012)	2nd	Dan Schmidt (D)	Tom Trail (R)	Shirley Ringo (D)

=== 2012–2022 ===
District 6 currently consists of Nez Perce and Lewis counties.

Legislature	Session	Senate	House Seat A	House Seat B
62nd (2012 - 2014)	1st	Dan Johnson (R)	Thyra Stevenson (R)	John Rusche (D)
62nd (2012 - 2014)	2nd	Dan Johnson (R)	Thyra Stevenson (R)	John Rusche (D)
63rd (2014 - 2016)	1st	Dan Johnson (R)	Dan Rudolph (D)	John Rusche (D)
63rd (2014 - 2016)	2nd	Dan Johnson (R)	Dan Rudolph (D)	John Rusche (D)
64th (2014 - 2016)	1st	Dan Johnson (R)	Thyra Stevenson (R)	Mike Kingsley (R)
64th (2014 - 2016)	2nd	Dan Johnson (R)	Thyra Stevenson (R)	Mike Kingsley (R)
65th (2018 - 2020)	1st	Dan Johnson (R)	Thyra Stevenson (R)	Mike Kingsley (R)
65th (2018 - 2020)	2nd	Dan Johnson (R)	Thyra Stevenson (R)	Mike Kingsley (R)
66th (2020 - 2022)	1st	Dan Johnson (R)	Aaron von Ehlinger (R)	Mike Kingsley (R)
66th (2020 - 2022)	2nd	Dan Johnson (R)	Lori McCann (R)	Mike Kingsley (R)

=== 2022–present ===
In December 2022, District 6 will consist of Latah and Lewis counties and a portion of Nez Perce County.

== See also ==
- List of Idaho senators
- List of Idaho representatives
