= Idaho's 7th legislative district =

American legislative district

Idaho's 7th legislative district, highlighted in purple, as of 2022

Idaho's 7th legislative district is one of 35 districts of the Idaho Legislature. It currently comprises Idaho and Adams counties, as well as part of Nez Perce County.

It is currently represented by State Senator Cindy Carlson, Republican of Riggins, as well as state representatives Mike Kingsley, Republican of Lewiston, and Charlie Shepherd, Republican of Pollock.

== District profile ==
=== 1992–2002 ===
From 1992 to 2002, District 7 consisted of Clearwater and Lewis Counties and a portion of Benewah, Idaho, Latah, and Nez Perce Counties.

Legislature	Session	Senate	House Seat A	House Seat B
51st (1992 - 1994)	1st	Marguerite McLaughlin (D)	Charles Cuddy (D)	June Judd (D)
51st (1992 - 1994)	2nd	Marguerite McLaughlin (D)	Charles Cuddy (D)	June Judd (D)
52nd (1994 - 1996)	1st	Marguerite McLaughlin (D)	Charles Cuddy (D)	June Judd (D)
52nd (1994 - 1996)	2nd	Marguerite McLaughlin (D)	Charles Cuddy (D)	June Judd (D)
53rd (1996 - 1998)	1st	Marguerite McLaughlin (D)	Charles Cuddy (D)	June Judd (D)
53rd (1996 - 1998)	2nd	Marguerite McLaughlin (D)	Charles Cuddy (D)	June Judd (D)
54th (1998 - 2000)	1st	Marguerite McLaughlin (D)	Charles Cuddy (D)	June Judd (D)
54th (1998 - 2000)	2nd	Marguerite McLaughlin (D)	Charles Cuddy (D)	June Judd (D)
55th (2000 - 2002)	1st	Skip Brandt (R)	Charles Cuddy (D)	Dick Harwood (R)
55th (2000 - 2002)	2nd	Skip Brandt (R)	Charles Cuddy (D)	Dick Harwood (R)

=== 2002–2012 ===
From 2002 to 2012, District 7 consisted of Nez Perce County.

Legislature	Session	Senate	House Seat A	House Seat B
57th (2002 - 2004)	1st	Joe Stegner (R)	Mike Mitchell (D)	Mike Naccarato (D)
57th (2002 - 2004)	2nd	Joe Stegner (R)	Mike Mitchell (D)	Mike Naccarato (D)
58th (2004 - 2006)	1st	Joe Stegner (R)	Mike Mitchell (D)	John Rusche (D)
58th (2004 - 2006)	2nd	Joe Stegner (R)	Mike Mitchell (D)	John Rusche (D)
59th (2006 - 2008)	1st	Joe Stegner (R)	Liz Chavez (D)	John Rusche (D)
59th (2006 - 2008)	2nd	Joe Stegner (R)	Liz Chavez (D)	John Rusche (D)
60th (2008 - 2010)	1st	Joe Stegner (R)	Liz Chavez (D)	John Rusche (D)
60th (2008 - 2010)	2nd	Joe Stegner (R)	Liz Chavez (D)	John Rusche (D)
61st (2010 - 2012)	1st	Joe Stegner (R)	Jeff Nesset (R)	John Rusche (D)
61st (2010 - 2012)	2nd	Dan Johnson (R)	Jeff Nesset (R)	John Rusche (D)

=== 2012–2022 ===
District 7 currently consists of Clearwater, Idaho, and Shoshone Counties and a portion of Bonner County.

Legislature	Session	Senate	House Seat A	House Seat B
62nd (2012 - 2014)	1st	Sheryl Nuxoll (R)	Shannon McMillan (R)	Paul Shepherd (R)
62nd (2012 - 2014)	2nd	Sheryl Nuxoll (R)	Shannon McMillan (R)	Paul Shepherd (R)
63rd (2014 - 2016)	1st	Sheryl Nuxoll (R)	Shannon McMillan (R)	Paul Shepherd (R)
63rd (2014 - 2016)	2nd	Sheryl Nuxoll (R)	Shannon McMillan (R)	Paul Shepherd (R)
64th (2016 - 2018)	1st	Carl Crabtree (R)	Priscilla Giddings (R)	Paul Shepherd (R)
64th (2016 - 2018)	2nd	Carl Crabtree (R)	Priscilla Giddings (R)	Paul Shepherd (R)
65th (2018 - 2020)	1st	Carl Crabtree (R)	Priscilla Giddings (R)	Paul Shepherd (R)
65th (2018 - 2020)	2nd	Carl Crabtree (R)	Priscilla Giddings (R)	Paul Shepherd (R)
66th (2020 - 2022)	1st	Carl Crabtree (R)	Priscilla Giddings (R)	Charlie Shepherd (R)
66th (2020 - 2022)	2nd	Carl Crabtree (R)	Priscilla Giddings (R)	Charlie Shepherd (R)

=== 2022–present ===
In December 2022, District 7 will consist of Idaho and Adams counties and a portion of Nez Perce County.

== See also ==
- List of Idaho senators
- List of Idaho representatives
