= Senator Brandt =

Senator Brandt may refer to:

- Craig Brandt (born 1968), New Mexico State Senate
- Skip Brandt (born 1964), Idaho State Senate
- Tom Brandt (born 1959), Nebraska State Senate

== See also ==
- Senator Brand (disambiguation)
