= Paulette Jordan =

American politician

Member of the Idaho House of Representatives from the 5A district
- In office December 1, 2014 – February 14, 2018
- Preceded by: Cindy Agidius
- Succeeded by: Margie Gannon

Personal details
- Born: December 7, 1979 (age 46) Northern Idaho, U.S.
- Citizenship: American; Coeur d'Alene
- Party: Democratic
- Education: University of Washington (BA)

Paulette E. Jordan (born December 7, 1979) is an American politician who served in the Idaho House of Representatives as a Democrat from 2014 to 2018. She previously served on the Coeur d'Alene Tribal Council, its sovereign government.

During her final term, she was the only Democrat serving in the state's legislature from North Idaho. Jordan was the Democratic nominee for governor of Idaho in the 2018 election, losing to Republican lieutenant governor Brad Little. She was the Democratic nominee in 2020 for the United States Senate, losing to incumbent Republican Jim Risch.

== Early life and education ==
Paulette Jordan was born into a ranching and farming family in northern Idaho, where she still holds timber and farmland. She is an enrolled citizen of the Coeur d'Alene tribe, which is based on the reservation of the same name. She also has Sinkiuse (known as the Moses–Columbia Band of the Colville Confederacy), Nez Perce, and Yakama–Palus ancestry. She is a descendant of the 19th-century chiefs Moses and Kamiakin, and 20th century Colville leader Lucy Friedlander Covington (1910 – 1982).

Jordan is an alumna of Gonzaga Preparatory School and the University of Washington. She completed an Executive Certificate at the University of Idaho College of Business and Economics Energy Policy Planning and Development Program, and earned a certificate in the Harvard Kennedy School Senior Executives in State and Local Governments Program.

== Career ==
While in Seattle, she held a variety of leadership roles in community activism and became involved in local city politics, also serving as an Advisor to the President of the university.

After returning to the reservation, Jordan ran for and was elected to the Tribal Council. From this position, she became the co-chair of gaming for the Affiliated Tribes of Northwest Indians (ATNI), an organization founded in 1953 so that tribes could act in concert on mutual interests. In 1969, ATNI passed a resolution honoring Jordan's great-grandmother Lucy Covington for her work opposing termination of the Colville Tribe. Jordan's engagement as a Native leader extends beyond the region to include national organizations. She is a Senior Executive Board representative, Finance Chair and Energy Initiative Chair for the National Indian Gaming Association, serving her third consecutive term.

=== Idaho House of Representatives ===
When legislator Tom Trail of Moscow decided to seek a seat on the Latah County Commission after redistricting in 2012, Jordan became a candidate for the legislature. In the general election, she was defeated by Republican Cindy Agidius, of Moscow, with a margin of under 1%. In 2014 she ran again for the same seat and defeated Agidius in the general election. She ran for reelection in 2016 and defeated Carl Berglund, of Kendrick.

Jordan served on the Business Committee, the Energy, Environment and Technology Committee, and State Affairs Committee from 2015 to 2018. In addition, Jordan was selected to serve on Legislative Council, which oversees management of the Capitol and permanent staff.

=== 2018 gubernatorial campaign ===
Jordan was the Democratic nominee for Governor of Idaho in the 2018 election, her main opponent in the general election was the Republican nominee and incumbent lieutenant governor, Brad Little.

Jordan announced her candidacy on December 7, 2017. In the primary she faced previous 2014 nominee A.J. Balukoff and Peter Dill in what was the most competitive Democratic primary since 1998. Eschewing corporate donations, she received most of her funding from Native American tribes.

Jordan describes herself as "very progressive", supporting Medicaid expansion and clean energy. Jordan is pro-choice, as a mother and as a legislator. She differed from her fellow Democratic opponent A.J. Balukoff in their April 22, 2018 televised debate primarily in her support for the decriminalizing of marijuana possession and the legalization of medical marijuana (cannabidiol). In early May it was announced that she and Kristin Collum, running for lieutenant governor, were a de facto joint ticket, and she received the endorsement of the Idaho Statesman in a split decision.

The Nation called Jordan the new face of rural politics in America, given the populist and progressive history of Idaho, and the split Democratic party establishment united behind her after the state's most competitive Democratic primary in decades.

In June 2018, Jordan remarked at the Idaho Democratic Party convention at College of Idaho in Caldwell that "We have begun the progressive movement across the country that people are believing in... The precipice of this movement begins in Idaho." In August 2018 the New York Times named her as one of four candidates who could become the first female governors of their states.

In August 2018 according to a poll her opponent's lead was at 8%, with Medicaid expansion being a significant issue. The statewide collapse of the Division of Motor Vehicles's information technology on the vendor side became a significant issue in September, with Jordan calling the $10.8M contract a "... boondoggle that is failing our state." Otter said that fixing the driver's license system was one of the state's highest priorities.

Jordan received significant national attention, with just under half of her donations coming from outside of Idaho. She received an endorsement from the singer Cher.

She eventually lost to Little by more than 21 points.

=== 2020 U.S. Senate campaign ===
On February 7, 2020, she announced a run for the United States Senate against incumbent senator Jim Risch. Jordan won the June 2, 2020 Democratic primary and faced Risch in the November general election. Risch ultimately won the general election with 62% of the vote.

== Electoral history ==
District 5 House Seat A - Latah and Benewah Counties
| Year | Candidate | Votes | Pct | Candidate | Votes | Pct |
|---|---|---|---|---|---|---|
| 2012 primary | Paulette Jordan | 891 | 68.5% | James Stivers | 410 | 31.5% |
| 2012 general | Paulette Jordan | 9,960 | 49.7% | Cindy Agidius | 10,083 | 50.3% |
| 2014 primary | Paulette Jordan | 1,377 | 100% | | | |
| 2014 general | Paulette Jordan | 7,371 | 51.8 % | Cindy Agidius (incumbent) | 6,847 | 48.2 % |
| 2016 primary | Paulette Jordan (incumbent) | 1,444 | 100% | | | |
| 2016 general | Paulette Jordan (incumbent) | 11,179 | 50.7% | Carl Berglund | 10,889 | 49.3% |

Idaho gubernatorial election, 2018
| Party | Candidate | Votes | % |
|---|---|---|---|
| Republican | Brad Little | 361,671 | 59.8 |
| Democratic | Paulette Jordan | 231,065 | 38.2 |
| Libertarian | Bev "Angel" Boeck | 6,557 | 1.1 |
| Constitution | Walter L. Bayes | 5,791 | 1.0 |
| Independent | Lisa Marie (write-in) | 92 | 0.0 |
| Majority | | | |
| Total votes | | | |

US Senate Election (Idaho)
| Year | Candidate | Votes | Pct | Candidate | Votes | Pct |
|---|---|---|---|---|---|---|
| 2020 primary | Paulette Jordan | 72,777 | 85.7% | Jim Vandermaas | 12,145 | 14.3% |
| 2020 general | Paulette Jordan | 285,864 | 33.2% | Jim Risch | 538,446 | 62.6% |

== See also ==
- List of Idaho state legislatures
- Elections in Idaho
- Native American women in politics
- 2018 Idaho gubernatorial election

Party political offices
| Preceded by A. J. Balukoff | Democratic nominee for Governor of Idaho; 2018 | Succeeded by Stephen Heidt |
| Preceded by Nels Mitchell | Democratic nominee for U.S. Senator from Idaho (Class 2); 2020 | Succeeded by David Roth; Withdrew |
