= Bill Goesling =

American politician and pilot from Idaho

Member of the Idaho House of Representatives from the 5th district
- In office December 1, 2018 – December 1, 2020
- Preceded by: Margie Gannon
- Succeeded by: Brandon Mitchell

Personal details
- Born: Cincinnati, Ohio, U.S.
- Party: Republican
- Spouse: Jo Goesling
- Children: 6
- Education: University of Montana (BA); Naval Postgraduate School (MS); University of Idaho (EdD)

Military service
- Allegiance: United States
- Branch/service: United States Navy

Bill Goesling is an American politician and retired United States Navy test pilot who served as a member of Idaho House of Representatives from 2018 to 2020.

== Early life and education ==
Goesling was born in Cincinnati, Ohio. In 1963, Goesling earned a Bachelor of Arts degree in chemistry from the University of Montana. Goesling the earned a Master of Science degree in applied science and management degrees from Naval Postgraduate School. In 1993, Goesling earned a PhD in education from the University of Idaho.

== Career ==
Goesling served in the United States Navy as a production pilot and flight instructor. Goesling flew aircraft such as the North American RA-5C Vigilante, A-7, and F-15. In 1989, Goesling retired with a rank of Commander from the United States Navy. Goesling earned a Distinguished Flying Cross.

Goesling became an instructor in ROTC program in Moscow, Idaho.

In 2004, Goesling became a chairman and commissioner of Idaho Public Charter School Commission, serving until 2011. In 2011, Goesling served as a Republican member of the Idaho State Board of Education, until 2016.

On November 6, 2018, Goesling won the election and became a Republican member of Idaho House of Representatives for District 5, seat A, succeeding Paulette Jordan. Goesling defeated Margaret R. Gannon with 51.0% of the votes.

Goesling chose not to run for re-election in 2020.

== Personal life ==
Goesling is married to Jo Goesling. They have six children and three grandchildren. Goesling and his family live in Moscow, Idaho.

== Election history ==
District 5 House Seat A - Latah and Benewah Counties
Year	Candidate	Votes	Pct	Candidate	Votes	Pct
2016 Primary	Bill Goesling	1,346	46.6%	Carl Berglund	1,541	53.4%
2018 Primary	Bill Goesling	2,454	60.3%	Hari Heath	1,619	39.7%
2018 General	Bill Goesling	9,888	51.0 %	Margaret Gannon	8,589	38.7 %
