= Senator Crabtree =

Senator Crabtree may refer to:

- Carl Crabtree (1952–2025), Idaho State Senate
- Casey Crabtree (born 1983), South Dakota State Senate
