= Agidius =

Agidius may refer to:

- Cindy Agidius, American politician
- Aegidius Hunnius, Lutheran theologian
- Agidius Romanus, Medieval philosopher
