= Mark Ricks =

American politician from Idaho

40th Lieutenant Governor of Idaho
- In office June 15, 2006 – January 1, 2007
- Governor: Jim Risch
- Preceded by: Jim Risch
- Succeeded by: Jim Risch

Member of the Idaho Senate
- In office 1979–1994

Personal details
- Born: July 4, 1924 Rexburg, Idaho, U.S.
- Died: September 29, 2016 (aged 92) Rexburg, Idaho
- Party: Republican
- Education: Ricks College

Mark George Ricks (July 4, 1924 – September 29, 2016) was an American Republican politician from Idaho. He served as the 40th lieutenant governor of Idaho from June 2006 to January 2007.

== Political career ==
Ricks' introduction to politics occurred in the late 1940s and early 1950s when he served as a Republican Precinct Committeeman. He was pressured to run for the Idaho Senate in 1976. He did not run, due to his time-consuming calling in the Church of Jesus Christ of Latter-day Saints as stake president. Because of his calling, he was put in charge of the recovery effort when the Teton Dam collapsed. Ricks was nationally recognized for his leadership in organizing the successful recovery effort.

At the urging of the Speaker of the Idaho House of Representatives (Allan Larsen) and many other prominent citizens, in 1978 Ricks ran for, and was elected to, the Idaho State Senate, serving his first term in 1979-1980. As a freshman Senator he was chosen to serve on the powerful Joint Finance Committee. This period also marks the beginning of the friendship and collaboration between Ricks and Jim Risch, then Senate Majority Leader.

Ricks served in the State Senate with many of Idaho's most influential leaders. As a former seatmate of Larry Craig, Ricks is known for commenting that Craig taught him to be a State Senator, and that "I had some influence on him, to prepare him to become a US Congressman."

During his second term in the State Senate Ricks served as the Chairman of the Commerce and Labor Committee, and in his third term he was nominated and elected as Senate Majority Leader, with Jim Risch as the President Pro Tem of the Senate. During his tenure as Senate Majority Leader he also worked with Mike Crapo, the Assistant Majority Leader.

Ricks was an alternate at-large delegate for Idaho Republican Party for the 1988 Republican National Convention.

In 2010, Ricks supported Brad Little for Lieutenant Governor of Idaho.

In 2014, Ricks supported Evan Frasure for Secretary of State of Idaho.

== 40th Lieutenant Governor of Idaho ==
Ricks was appointed lieutenant governor by Governor Jim Risch to fill a vacancy caused by Risch's succession to the governorship in May 2006 Ricks presided over Idaho's 27th Special Session, which dealt with the Idaho Property Tax Relief Act of 2006.

He was succeeded by Risch, who was reelected lieutenant governor in November 2006. Ricks was not a candidate for public office that year. His appointment was seen by some as an effort by Risch to reach out to voters in the Eastern Idaho region, should Risch decide to run for governor at some point in time. However, Risch dismissed this as "pure speculation."

== Personal life ==
Ricks was born and raised in Rexburg, Idaho. He graduated from Madison High School, where he played football. He attended Ricks College, played on the basketball team, and graduated with a bachelor's degree.

He married Evelyn Tonks in 1944 at the Logan, Utah Temple.

Ricks served a two-year mission for The Church of Jesus Christ of Latter-day Saints in Northern California in the late 1940s.

Ricks was a bishop, a stake president (during the 1976 Teton Dam failure and played a key role in local disaster relief efforts), and regional representative of the Twelve. He also served as the Nauvoo Visitor Center Director for 25 months, completed an 18-month mission in Salt Lake City at the Missionary Department, and was temple president of the Idaho Falls Idaho Temple from 1999 to 2002.

He died on September 29, 2016, in Rexburg, Idaho, at the age of 92.

His son, Doug Ricks, serves in the Idaho Legislature

== Awards and community involvement ==
Awards

- Induction to the Eastern Idaho Agriculture Hall of Fame in 1989
- Named as one of ten nationally Outstanding Legislators by the National Republican Legislators Association in 1987
- Recipient of the Rexburg Chamber of Commerce Community Service Production and Example Award in 1976
- Recipient of the Madison School District #321 Outstanding Service Award in 1987
- Recipient of the Ricks College Distinguished Alumni Award in 1988
- Outstanding Republican Legislator by the Idaho Republican Party in 1991
- Silver Beaver Award from the Boy Scouts of America in 1998
- Lifetime Achievement Award from the Rexburg Chamber of Commerce in 2007

Community involvement

- Member of the Executive Board of the Teton Peaks Council (merged into Grand Teton Council in 1994) of the Boy Scouts of America
- Member of the National Conference of State Legislators (NCSL) Executive Committee 1985-1987 (also chaired the NCSL Nominating Committee)
- Member of the Council of State Government (CSG) Executive Committee 1989-1990
- Chairman of the CSG Western Legislative Conference 1988-1989
- Blue Ribbon Task Force, where he served as a member of the Revenue and Economic Development Committee in 2002
- Idaho Wheat Growers member
- National Federation of Independent Businesses member
- Rexburg Chamber of Commerce member

== Legacy ==
Senator Jim Risch issued this statement when Ricks died in 2016: "Vicki and I were deeply saddened to hear of the passing of our good friend Mark Ricks. In the years we served together in the Idaho Senate, I came to know Mark as a man of great character and a loyal friend. When I became Governor I was required to appoint a Lieutenant Governor who would succeed me should I be unable to serve. I could think of no better person than Mark to fulfill that obligation. Mark was a gentleman and a statesman and his reputation for trustworthiness was legendary. He was more than a friend; he was a trusted confidant and advisor to me. Our thoughts and prayers go out to his family."

Senator Mike Crapo said, "Idaho has lost a great leader, I had a great working relationship with Mark Ricks in the Idaho Senate and as lieutenant governor. His passion for serving Idahoans and attention to legislative detail is what I will remember most."

Political offices
Preceded by Jim Risch	Lieutenant Governor of Idaho; June 15, 2006 – January 1, 2007	Succeeded by Jim Risch
