= Senator Sorenson =

Senator Sorenson or Sorensen may refer to:

- Albert Sorensen (1932–2026), Iowa State Senate
- Karen Sorensen (born 1959), Province of Alberta Senate
- Kent Sorenson (born 1972), Iowa State Senate
- Liane M. Sorenson (born 1947), Delaware State Senate
- Pete Sorenson (born 1952), Oregon State Senate
- Sheila Sorensen (born 1947), Idaho State Senate
