= Cindy Agidius =

American politician from Idaho

Member of the Idaho House of Representatives from the 5A district
- In office December 1, 2012 – December 1, 2014
- Preceded by: Bob Nonini
- Succeeded by: Paulette Jordan

Personal details
- Born: Spokane, Washington, U.S.
- Party: Republican
- Spouse: Paul
- Children: 4

Cindy Agidius is an American politician who served as a member of the Idaho House of Representatives for the 5A district from 2012 to 2014.

== Early life and education ==
Agidius was born in Spokane, Washington. Agidius grew up in Wallace, Idaho, graduating from Wallace High School. She attended the University of Idaho.

== Career ==
Agidius was a realtor in Moscow, Idaho. She was also a staffer for United States Senators Dirk Kempthorne and Mike Crapo.

Agidius is a member of the Latah County Board of Realtors and the Moscow Chamber of Commerce. She was the state director of the Idaho Women's Commission during Kempthorne's tenure as governor.

On November 6, 2012, Agidius won the election and became a Republican member of Idaho House of Representatives for District 5 seat A. Agidius defeated Paulette Jordan with 50.3% of the votes. On November 4, 2014 Agidius was defeated for re-election by Paulette Jordan with 51.8% of the votes.

After her defeat from the House of Representatives, Agidius was hired by the Idaho House Republican Caucus as its communications director for the 2015 legislative session. House Minority Leader John Rusche of Lewiston asked Speaker Scott Bedke for her removal from the position, alleging that Agidius was abusing her role as communications director by 'harassing' and 'spying' on her former opponent, Representative Paulette Jordan. Agidius took a photograph of Jordan swiveling in her chair when U.S. Senator Jim Risch addressed the Idaho House of Representatives, which Agidius saw as disrespectful, and criticized Jordan on Facebook for missing a committee vote on a concealed weapons bill, a comment which was later removed. Agidius remained as communications director and responded to the allegations, "In my opinion, a problem never existed. I have enough to do here without worrying about what Paulette's doing. There have been a few instances when I've seen her do things she said she wouldn't do. Those are things I may store and remember, if I choose to run again." Agidius did not challenge Jordan in 2016.

In 2026 Agidius again ran for the legislature, seeking to win the district 6A seat. She was defeated in the Republican primary by Colton Bennett.

== Personal life ==
Agidius and her husband, Paul, have four children. Agidius and her family live in Moscow, Idaho.

== Elections ==
District 5 – Latah and Benewah Counties
Year	Candidate	Votes	Pct	Candidate	Votes	Pct
2012 Primary	Cindy Agidius	2,638	100%			
2012 General	Cindy Agidius	10,083	50.3%	Paulette Jordan	9,960	49.7%
2014 Primary	Cindy Agidius (incumbent)	1,945	100%			
2014 General	Cindy Agidius (incumbent)	6,847	48.2%	Paulette Jordan	7,371	51.8%

Idaho House District 6A, Republican primary election, 2026
Party	Candidate	Votes	%
Republican	Colton Bennett	4,860	61.6
Republican	Cindy Agidius	3,034	38.4
Total votes		7,894	100.0
