= Senator Madsen =

Senator Madsen may refer to:

- Charles D. Madsen (1906–1975), Wisconsin State Senate
- Mark B. Madsen (born 1963), Utah State Senate
- Roger Madsen (fl. 1980s–2010s), Idaho State Senate
