= 2020 United States Senate election in Idaho =

- November 3, 2020
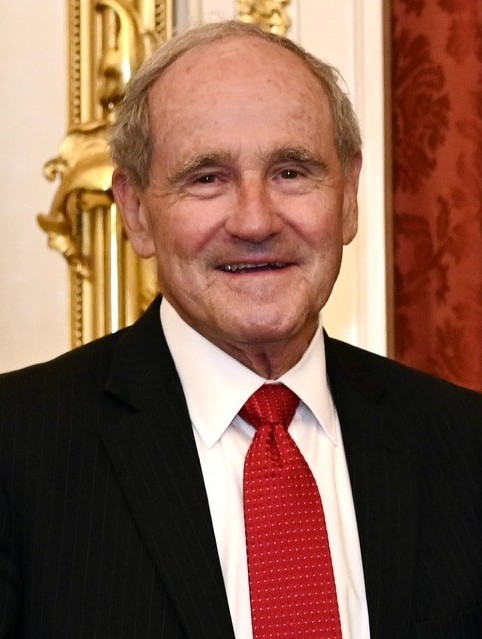

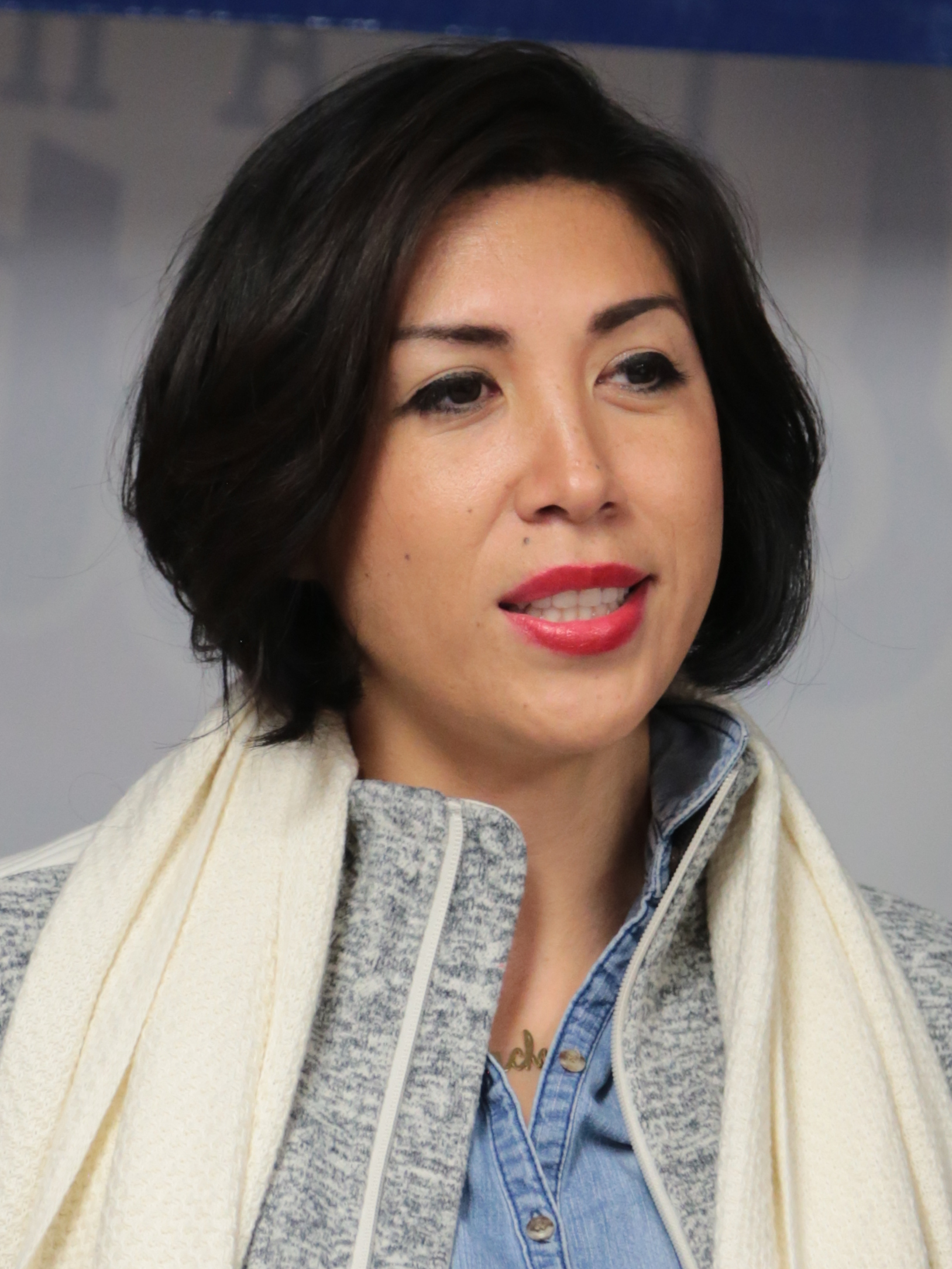
Nominee	Jim Risch	Paulette Jordan
Party	Republican	Democratic
Popular vote	538,446	285,864
Percentage	62.62%	33.25%
- Risch: 40–50% 50–60% 60–70% 70–80% 80–90% >90% Jordan: 40–50% 50–60% 60–70% 70–80% 80–90% >90% Tie: 40–50% No data
U.S. senator before election
Jim Risch
Republican
Elected U.S. senator
Jim Risch
Republican

The 2020 United States Senate election in Idaho was held on November 3, 2020, to elect a member of the United States Senate to represent the State of Idaho, concurrently with the 2020 U.S. presidential election, as well as other elections to the United States Senate, elections to the United States House of Representatives and various state and local elections.

Incumbent Republican senator Jim Risch won reelection to a third term in office, defeating Democratic nominee Paulette Jordan, who, percentage wise, had the worst performance of a Democratic senatorial candidate for this seat since 2002. However, Risch also performed nearly three points worse than he did when he was reelected in 2014, and he slightly underperformed incumbent president Donald Trump's performance in the concurrent presidential election.

== Republican primary ==
=== Candidates ===
==== Nominee ====
- Jim Risch, incumbent U.S. senator

=== Results ===
Republican primary results
Party	Candidate	Votes	%
Republican	Jim Risch (incumbent)	200,184	100.00%
Total votes		200,184	100.00%

== Democratic primary ==
=== Candidates ===
==== Nominee ====
- Paulette Jordan, former state representative and nominee for governor of Idaho in 2018

==== Eliminated in primary ====
- James Vandermaas, former law enforcement officer and candidate for Idaho's 1st congressional district in 2018

==== Withdrawn ====
- Nancy Harris, businesswoman (endorsed Jordan)
- Travis Oler, farmer and U.S. Army veteran (ran for state house) (endorsed Vandermaas)

==== Declined ====
- A.J. Balukoff, Boise School District board member, nominee for governor of Idaho in 2014, and candidate for governor of Idaho in 2018 (endorsed Vandermaas)
- Mark Nye, state senator
- Michelle Stennett, minority leader of the Idaho Senate

=== Endorsements ===
Paulette Jordan

Individuals

- Nancy Harris, businesswoman and withdrawn candidate
- Aaron Paul, actor known for Breaking Bad

Publications

- Idaho Statesman
James Vandermaas

Individuals

- A.J. Balukoff, Boise School District board member and nominee for governor of Idaho in 2014
- Travis Oler, farmer and withdrawn candidate

=== Results ===
County results: Jordan: 70–80%; 80–90%; 90–100%

Democratic primary results
Party	Candidate	Votes	%
Democratic	Paulette Jordan	72,778	85.70%
Democratic	James Vandermaas	12,145	14.30%
Total votes		84,923	100.00%

== Other candidates ==
=== Constitution Party ===
==== Nominee ====
- Ray Writz

=== Independents ===
==== Declared ====
- Natalie Fleming, software developer

== General election ==
=== Predictions ===
Source	Ranking	As of
The Cook Political Report	Solid R	October 29, 2020
Inside Elections	Safe R	October 28, 2020
Sabato's Crystal Ball	Safe R	November 2, 2020
Daily Kos	Safe R	October 30, 2020
Politico	Safe R	November 2, 2020
RCP	Safe R	October 23, 2020
DDHQ	Safe R	November 3, 2020
538	Safe R	November 2, 2020
Economist	Safe R	November 2, 2020

=== Endorsements ===
Paulette Jordan (D)

U.S vice presidents

- Joe Biden, 47th vice president of the United States and 2020 Democratic nominee for President

Individuals

- Nancy Harris, businesswoman and candidate for U.S. Senate in 2020
- Aaron Paul, actor known for Breaking Bad

Organizations

- Center for Biological Diversity
- DSCC
- Emily’s List
- National Education Association
- National Women's Political Caucus

Publications

- Idaho Statesman

=== Polling ===
Poll source	Date(s) administered	Sample size (Note: Key: A – all adults RV – registered voters LV – likely voters V – unclear)	Margin of error	Jim Risch (R)	Paulette Jordan (D)	Other	Undecided
(Note: Poll conducted for the Women's Liberation Front.)	August 29 – September 1, 2020	600 (LV)	± 4.0%	53%	28%	8% (Note: "Another candidate" with 8%)	11%

=== Results ===
United States Senate election in Idaho, 2020
Party	Candidate	Votes	%	±%
Republican	Jim Risch (incumbent)	538,446	62.62%	−2.71%
Democratic	Paulette Jordan	285,864	33.25%	−1.42%
Independent	Natalie Fleming	25,329	2.95%	N/A
Constitution	Ray Writz	10,188	1.18%	N/A
Total votes		859,827	100.0%	
Republican hold				

==== By county ====
County	Jim Risch Republican		Paulette Jordan Democratic		Natalie Fleming Independent		Ray Writz Constitution		Margin		Total votes
County	#	%	#	%	#	%	#	%	#	%	Total votes
Ada	130,446	50.56	118,718	46.01	6,940	2.69	1,910	0.74	11,728	4.55	258,014
Adams	1,828	71.38	625	24.40	62	2.42	46	1.80	1,203	46.97	2,561
Bannock	22,048	55.94	15,472	39.26	1,433	3.64	460	1.17	6,576	16.68	39,413
Bear Lake	2,791	84.55	355	10.75	91	2.76	64	1.94	2,436	73.80	3,301
Benewah	3,584	73.55	1,081	22.18	103	2.11	105	2.15	2,503	51.36	4,873
Bingham	14,644	73.83	4,313	21.74	625	3.15	253	1.27	10,331	52.08	19,835
Blaine	4,226	31.76	8,739	65.67	288	2.16	54	0.41	-4,513	-33.91	13,307
Boise	3,323	69.36	1,247	26.03	128	2.67	93	1.94	2,076	43.33	4,791
Bonner	17,964	66.48	8,079	29.90	601	2.22	377	1.39	9,885	36.58	27,021
Bonneville	36,490	68.81	13,913	26.24	1,972	3.72	653	1.23	22,577	42.58	53,028
Boundary	4,800	76.70	1,212	19.37	131	2.09	115	1.84	3,588	57.33	6,258
Butte	1,120	79.43	222	15.74	39	2.77	29	2.06	898	63.69	1,410
Camas	488	72.30	156	23.11	17	2.52	14	2.07	332	49.19	675
Canyon	59,060	65.92	26,603	26.69	2,550	2.85	1,384	1.54	32,457	36.23	89,597
Caribou	2,603	81.45	442	13.83	97	3.03	54	1.69	2,161	67.62	3,196
Cassia	7,564	78.91	1,508	15.73	322	3.36	192	2.00	6,056	63.18	9,586
Clark	254	81.67	42	13.50	12	3.86	3	0.96	212	68.17	311
Clearwater	3,357	76.66	883	20.16	104	2.38	35	0.80	2,474	56.50	4,379
Custer	1,978	73.04	603	22.27	74	2.73	53	1.96	1,375	50.77	2,708
Elmore	6,797	67.17	2,814	27.81	317	3.13	191	1.89	3,983	39.36	10,119
Franklin	5,678	85.85	585	8.84	217	3.28	134	2.03	5,093	77.00	6,614
Fremont	5,391	80.39	1,001	14.93	205	3.06	109	1.62	4,390	65.46	6,706
Gem	7,546	76.13	1,957	19.74	268	2.70	141	1.42	5,589	56.39	9,912
Gooding	4,442	73.56	1,335	22.11	186	3.08	76	1.26	3,107	51.45	6,039
Idaho	7,629	80.47	1,532	16.16	214	2.26	106	1.12	6,097	64.31	9,481
Jefferson	11,702	83.19	1,647	11.71	481	3.42	236	1.68	10,055	71.48	14,066
Jerome	5,450	69.98	1,978	25.40	249	3.20	111	1.42	3,472	44.58	7,788
Kootenai	61,289	69.68	22,945	26.09	2,538	2.89	1,183	1.34	38,344	43.59	87,955
Latah	9,501	46.14	10,373	50.37	532	2.58	187	0.91	-872	-4.23	20,593
Lemhi	3,497	74.37	1,020	21.69	141	3.00	44	0.94	2,477	52.68	4,702
Lewis	1,420	76.84	357	19.32	38	2.06	33	1.79	1,063	57.52	1,848
Lincoln	1,371	71.00	470	24.34	71	3.68	19	0.98	901	46.66	1,931
Madison	13,517	79.79	2,288	13.51	783	4.62	353	2.08	11,229	66.28	16,941
Minidoka	5,930	74.84	1,587	20.03	307	3.88	99	1.25	4,343	54.81	7,923
Nez Perce	13,487	64.73	6,510	31.24	684	3.28	155	0.74	6,977	33.49	20,836
Oneida	2,039	84.47	253	10.48	68	2.82	54	2.24	1,786	73.99	2,414
Owyhee	3,643	76.84	910	19.19	106	2.24	82	1.73	2,733	57.65	4,741
Payette	8,488	75.56	2,308	20.55	306	2.72	131	1.17	6,180	55.02	11,233
Power	2,053	67.20	876	28.67	91	2.98	35	1.15	1,177	38.53	3,055
Shoshone	3,904	65.85	1,747	29.46	181	3.05	97	1.64	2,157	36.38	5,929
Teton	2,837	44.96	3,251	51.52	180	2.85	42	0.67	-414	-6.56	6,310
Twin Falls	24,355	67.58	9,776	27.12	1,318	3.66	591	1.64	14,579	40.45	36,040
Valley	3,862	54.89	2,984	42.41	155	2.20	35	0.50	878	12.48	7,036
Washington	4,050	75.69	1,147	21.43	104	1.94	50	0.93	2,903	54.25	5,351
Totals	538,446	62.62	285,864	33.25	25,329	2.95	10,188	1.18	252,582	29.38	859,827

Counties that flipped from Republican to Democratic

- Latah (largest municipality: Moscow)
- Teton (largest municipality: Victor)

==== By congressional district ====
Risch won both congressional districts.

District	Risch	Jordan	Representative
1st	66%	30%	Russ Fulcher
2nd	59%	37%	Mike Simpson

== See also ==
- 2020 Idaho elections

== Notes ==
Partisan clients
