= Margie Gannon =

American politician

Member of the Idaho House of Representatives from the 5A district
- In office February 28, 2018 – December 2018
- Preceded by: Paulette Jordan
- Succeeded by: Bill Goesling

Personal details
- Born: Margaret Gannon Kellogg, Idaho, U.S.
- Party: Democratic
- Spouse: Hugh
- Education: Big Bend Community College (ASN)

Margaret "Margie" Gannon is an American politician who served as a member of the Idaho House of Representatives for the 5A district from February 2018 to December 2018.

== Early life and education ==
Gannon was born in Kellogg, Idaho. She earned an Associate of Science in Nursing from the Big Bend Community College in Moses Lake, Washington.

== Career ==
For 17 years, Gannon worked as an eligibility examiner for the Idaho Department of Health and Welfare. She also served as a member of the St. Maries, Idaho School Board and St. Maries City Council. Gannon was appointed to the Idaho House of Representatives on February 23, 2018, after Paulette Jordan resigned to run in the 2018 Idaho gubernatorial election.
