= Priscilla Giddings =

American politician and pilot from Idaho

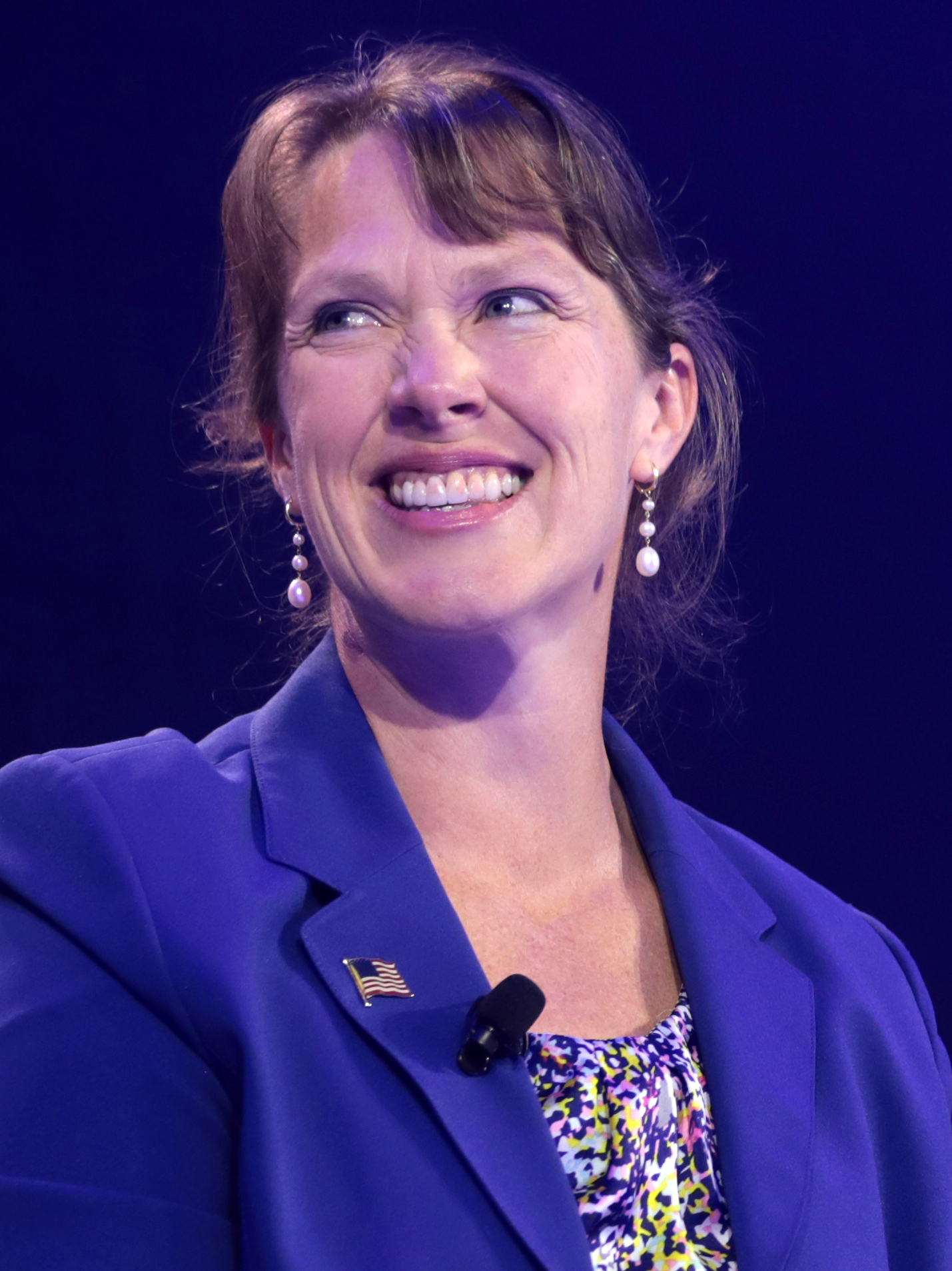

Member of the Idaho House of Representatives from the 7A district
- In office December 1, 2016 – November 30, 2022
- Preceded by: Shannon McMillan
- Succeeded by: Ron Mendive (redistricting)

Personal details
- Born: June 1983 (age 43)
- Party: Republican
- Spouse: Matt
- Children: 2
- Education: United States Air Force Academy (BS); California University of Pennsylvania (MS)

Military service
- Allegiance: United States
- Branch/service: United States Air Force
- Rank: Lieutenant colonel
- Unit: Idaho Air National Guard

Priscilla Giddings is an American politician who was a member of the Idaho House of Representatives from the 7A district from 2016 to 2022. Claimed by numerous media outlets to be a member of the far-right faction of the Idaho Republican Party, she unsuccessfully sought the party's nomination for lieutenant governor of Idaho in the 2022 election. In 2021, Giddings was censured by the Idaho Legislature for publishing the identity of the teenage victim raped by her Republican colleague Rep. Aaron von Ehlinger, attacking her online and in newsletters; and then lying under oath.

== Early life and education ==
Giddings was born in Bakersfield, California, where she lived for much of her childhood. She and her parents gradually relocated to a ranch in White Bird, Idaho, in the late 1990s. She graduated from Salmon River High School. In 2005, Giddings earned a Bachelor of Science degree in biology from the United States Air Force Academy. In 2012, Giddings earned a Master of Science in exercise and sports science from the California University of Pennsylvania.

== Career ==
Giddings spent nine years on active duty in the United States Air Force. She was a pilot with the 81st Fighter Squadron, and was a B Flight Commander from 2008 to 2014. In 2014, Giddings became an air liaison officer in Idaho Air National Guard's 124th Air Support Operations Squadron. In 2014, Giddings was an admissions liaison officer in the Air Force Reserve Officer Training Corps. She held the rank of major in the Air Force Reserve, and in 2021 was promoted to lieutenant colonel. Giddings is the president of Air Force Academy Idaho Alumni Association.

=== Idaho House of Representatives ===
==== Elections ====
Giddings represents the 7th district, which encompasses Idaho, Clearwater, and Shoshone counties, plus a small portion of Bonner County.

In 2016, Giddings defeated incumbent Shannon McMillan, in the Republican primary with 61.1% of the vote. Giddings defeated Democratic candidate Jessica Chilcott with 70.8% of the votes in the general election.

In 2018, Giddings defeated McMillan and Ryan Lawrence with 56.1% of the vote in the Republican primary. Giddings was unopposed in the general election.

In 2020, Giddings defeated Dennis Harper in the Republican primary with 56.43% of the vote. Giddings was unopposed in the general election.

==== Tenure ====
Giddings is associated with the far-right wing of the Republican Party. During her tenure in the House, Giddings has often disparaged the press, dismissing unflattering news stories as "fake". In 2021, Giddings sought to defund Idaho Public Television. Her motion failed on a 2–16 vote.

In 2016, Giddings claimed a homeowner's exemption over two homes. Under Idaho law, a taxpayer may claim a homeowner's exemption over only one primary, occupied residence. The Ada County assessor's office sought back taxes against Giddings, and Ada County commissioners voted unanimously that Giddings was not entitled to an exemption over her Garden City home, and denied her appeal in 2018.

In 2019, Giddings introduced a measure to block requirements that incoming 12th grade students receive a meningitis booster vaccination. In 2019, Giddings proposed legislation to require schools and daycare centers to notify parents of their entitlement to exempt their children from all required immunizations; the bill passed the state House, but died in the Senate. In 2020, Giddings sponsored legislation that would prohibit the state or any Idaho locality from contracting with a business that "discriminates against persons on the basis of their vaccination records or vaccination state." She condemned healthcare providers who required their employees to be vaccinated.

In 2019, Giddings introduced a measure urging Congress to remove "wilderness study area" status from hundreds of thousands of acres of land in Idaho, opening these areas up to industrial use.

In 2021, Giddings voted against a $1.1 billion bill to increase salaries for Idaho public schoolteachers; as a result, the bill failed on equally divided (34–34) state House vote. Also in 2021, Giddings was among the most outspoken opponents of accepting $6 million in federal funds for grants to early childhood education providers; a dispute over whether to accept the funds sparked a political furor in the state, as right-wing state legislators promoted misinformation and fringe conspiracy theories about the bill.

==== Censure ====
In April 2021, Idaho Republican state Representative Aaron von Ehlinger raped a 19-year-old intern. In August 2021, on her Facebook account and in her newsletter, Giddings publicly released the identity and a photo of the woman, who had previously been referred to as Jane Doe to protect her identity. Giddings also made disparaging remarks about the woman and the allegations. When this was referred to the Idaho House Ethics Committee, Giddings initially denied sharing the information. During the meeting, another committee member showed lawmakers that the post was still on Giddings' Facebook account. Giddings' answers were described as "combative and evasive," including when it was suggested that the bullying the intern had experienced would discourage women from reporting sexual assault. Giddings also disparaged the intern as a "honey trap" in a newsletter. Giddings' statements prompted an outpouring of criticism and an ethics investigation against her.

Giddings denounced the bipartisan House Ethics Committee hearing on her conduct, accusing House Speaker Scott Bedke of creating a "weaponized ethics hearing" with the sole intent of defeating her in the primary, despite the original ethics complaint being made before either had announced their runs for lieutenant governor. The House Ethics Committee unanimously found Giddings acted in a manner "unbecoming of a representative." They recommended to the full House that Giddings be censured and stripped of her seat on the House Commerce and Human Resources Committee. Giddings did not attend most of the hearing against her. The Ethics Committee did not recommend a more severe sanction, such as expulsion from the House or from Giddings' two other committee seats (the Finance-Appropriations and the Agricultural Affairs committees).

In November 2021, on a 49–19 vote, the House censured Giddings and stripped her of the House Commerce and Human Resources Committee assignment. During the debate on the censure proposal, Giddings denied any wrongdoing. Some of Giddings' fellow Republicans defended her conduct, while others criticized it. The representatives who voted for censure cited, among other things, that Giddings lied under oath by denying that she publicized the intern's personal information.

=== 2022 lieutenant governor election ===
In May 2021, Giddings announced her candidacy for the Republican nomination for lieutenant governor in 2022. In the primary, she faced state House Speaker Scott Bedke. Giddings refused to agree to a televised debate with Bedke, saying that she believed the moderators would be biased against her. In the May 2022 primary, Bedke defeated Giddings. Giddings won most of the counties in the Idaho Panhandle, but Bedke outperformed Giddings in most other counties in the state.

== Personal life ==
Giddings and her husband Matt have two children. Giddings and her family live in White Bird, Idaho.
