= Frank Bruneel =

American politician from Idaho (1935–2025)

Majority Leader of the Idaho House of Representatives
- In office 1998–2002
- Preceded by: Bruce Newcomb
- Succeeded by: Lawerence Denney

Member of the Idaho House of Representatives
- In office December 1, 1994 – December 1, 2002
- Preceded by: Paul Keeton
- Succeeded by: Tom Trail (redistricting)
- Constituency: 6th district Seat A (1994–2002)

Personal details
- Born: May 4, 1935 Boise, Idaho, U.S.
- Died: December 9, 2025 (aged 90) Eagle, Idaho, U.S.
- Party: Republican
- Spouse: Sharon Bruneel
- Children: 8
- Relatives: Craig Bruneel (son)
- Occupation: Politician, businessman

Franklin Camiel Bruneel (May 4, 1935 – December 9, 2025) was an American politician and businessman from Idaho who was a member of Idaho House of Representatives.

== Early life ==
On May 4, 1935, Bruneel was born in Boise, Idaho. Bruneel graduated from Boise High School.

== Career ==
Bruneel was a businessman in the tires industry. Bruneel was the founder of Bruneel Tires.

In 1994, Bruneel transferred his day-to-day operational duties at Bruneel Tires to his son Craig Bruneel.

On November 8, 1994, Bruneel won the election and became a Republican member of Idaho House of Representatives for District 6, seat A. Bruneel defeated Paul Keeton with 53.9% of the votes. On November 5, 1996, as an incumbent, Bruneel won the election and continued serving District 6, seat A. Bruneel defeated Lovetta Eisele with 57.3% of the votes. On November 3, 1998, as an incumbent, Bruneel won the election and continued serving District 6, seat A. Bruneel defeated Rian K. Van Leuven with 54.3% of the votes. On November 7, 2000, as an incumbent, Bruneel won the election unopposed and continued serving District 6, seat 6.

In June 2006, Bruneel was appointed the chairman of Idaho Transportation Board.

Bruneel was a small airplane pilot. Bruneel operated his Cessna 206 aircraft.

== Personal life and death ==
Bruneel's wife was Sharon Bruneel. They had eight children. Bruneel and his family lived in Eagle, Idaho. He died there on December 9, 2025, at the age of 90.
