= Leland G. Heinrich =

American politician (born 1943)

Member of the Idaho Senate from the 8th district
- In office December 1, 2006 – December 1, 2010
- Preceded by: Skip Brandt
- Succeeded by: Sheryl Nuxoll

Personal details
- Born: July 29, 1943 (age 82) Boise, Idaho, U.S.
- Party: Republican
- Spouse: Brenda Heinrich
- Children: 5
- Education: University of Idaho (BS)
- Occupation: Politician

Leland G. Heinrich (born July 29, 1943) is an American politician who served as a member of the Idaho State Senate from 2006 to 2010.

== Early life and education ==
On July 29, 1943, Heinrich was born in Boise, Idaho.

In 1965, Heinrich earned a Bachelor of Science degree in Agricultural Economics from the University of Idaho.

== Career ==
On November 7, 2006, Heinrich won the election and became a Republican member of Idaho Senate for District 8. Heinrich defeated Scott McLeod with 51.55% of the votes. On November 4, 2008, as an incumbent, Heinrich won the election and continued serving District 8. Heinrich defeated Randy K. Doman with 61.7% of the votes. On May 25, 2010, as an incumbent, Heinrich lost the election in the Republican Primary Election. Heinrich was defeated by Sheryl L. Nuxoll with 56.9% of the votes.

== Personal life ==
Heinrich's wife is Brenda Heinrich. They have five children.
