= Sheryl Nuxoll =

American politician and educator from Idaho

Member of the Idaho Senate from District 7
- In office December 1, 2012 – December 1, 2016
- Preceded by: Dan Johnson
- Succeeded by: Carl Crabtree

Member of the Idaho Senate from District 8
- In office December 1, 2010 – December 1, 2012
- Preceded by: Leland G. Heinrich
- Succeeded by: Steven Thayn

Personal details
- Born: March 7, 1951 (age 75) Cottonwood, Idaho, U.S.
- Party: Republican
- Spouse: Felix
- Education: Gonzaga University
- Occupation: Politician, Teacher

Sheryl L. Nuxoll (born March 7, 1951) is an American politician from the state of Idaho. A Republican, Nuxoll was an Idaho State Senator from 2010 to 2012 representing District 8 and then District 7 from 2012 until 2016, when she lost her bid for renomination in the primary.

== Early life and career ==
Nuxoll was born on March 7, 1951, in Cottonwood, Idaho. She worked as a bookkeeper for her father's business, Hoene Implement, located in Cottonwood, Grangeville, and Pierce. She received a bachelor's degree in business from Gonzaga University in 1973. in 1973.

Nuxoll has worked as a part-time high school teacher since 2008; she has also worked as a bookkeeper.

According to her official legislative biography, Nuxoll held a CPA license until 1988. From 2008 to 2012, Nuxoll was a member of the Idaho County Republican Central Committee.

== Political career ==
=== Idaho Senate District 7 ===
Redistricted to new Senate District 7, Nuxoll won the May 2012 Republican primary with 4,084 votes (73.2%).

In the November 2012 general election, Nuxoll won 11,583 votes (64.0%), defeating independent candidate Jon Cantamessa, who received 6,522 votes (36.0%).

In the May 2016 Republican primary election, Nuxoll lost the party nomination to rancher Carl G. Crabtree. Nuxoll received 2,383 votes (48.9%) to Crabtree's 2,494 votes (51.1%).

=== Idaho Senate District 8 ===
Nuxoll won the Republican primary with 56.9% of the vote against Leland G. "Lee" Heinrich.

She won the November 2010 general election with 10,051 votes (69.9%), defeating Democratic candidate Leta Strauss.

== Idaho Senate ==
Nuxoll was a vice chair of the Senate Health & Welfare Committee and a member of the Finance Committee and Resources & Environment Committee.

== Controversies ==
In 2012, Nuxoll spent $890 in taxpayer funds to mail an end-of-session brochure to Republican voters only. The mailing, which promoted her activities in office and thanked her supporters, was sent to both the district she represented (Senate District 8), and the district in which she was running for re-election (Senate District 7). State legislators are permitted to send out such taxpayer-funded mailings for informational purposes but not for political campaigning. After the mailing came to public attention, Nuxoll reimbursed the state for the cost.

In November 2012, after Republican presidential nominee Mitt Romney lost the presidential election to Barack Obama, Nuxoll called upon states that supported Romney "to refuse to participate in the Electoral College" in a bid to reverse the election result and have Romney become president. The notion, which originated in a blog post by Tea Party Nation founder Judson Phillips, was viewed as highly unlikely. Constitutional scholar David Adler of Boise State University said that the idea was "really a strange and bizarre fantasy" and was based on a misreading of the Twelfth Amendment. Nuxoll dismissed the criticism, accused Obama of "depriving us of our freedoms by all the agencies", and stated "what I'm thinking is the states are going to have to stand up for our individual rights and for our collective rights."

In January 2013, Nuxoll, sent a mass email and Tweet comparing the Affordable Care Act to the Holocaust and likening health insurers' participation in state health insurance marketplaces to "the Jews boarding the trains to concentration camps". The Anti-Defamation League criticized Nuxoll's remarks. Nuxoll defended her remarks, asserting that the legislation was "replacing capitalism with socialism".

In March 2015, Nuxoll became embroiled in controversy after she stated that Hinduism was "a false faith with false gods" and, along with fellow state senators Steve Vick and Lori Den Hartog, refused to attend a session of the legislature that commenced with a Hindu invocation prayer given by Hindu cleric Rajan Zed. Despite calls for her to apologize from a wide variety of religious leaders, Nuxoll stood by her remarks.

In 2015, Nuxoll led an effort to kill child support legislation to amend Idaho law to comply with federal law and the Hague Convention on International Recovery of Child Support and Family Maintenance. Nuxoll claimed, inaccurately, that the measure would force Idaho to recognize Sharia law. The push against the legislation by Nuxoll and others sharply divided Republican state legislators in Idaho. State Representative Luke Malek of Coeur d'Alene, for example, was critical of Nuxoll and her allies, calling their maneuvers "heavy-handed opportunistic theatrics at the expense of single-parents and children". Nuxoll and the eight other state legislators that sought to block the bill were also criticized by Spokesman-Review columnist Shawn Vestal, who wrote that the effort was a "paranoid, conspiracy-minded action" by far-right legislators in response to an "imaginary crisis". The initial defeat of the legislation forced Governor Butch Otter to call a special session of the legislature to pass the bill; during the special session, Nuxoll was one of only two senators to vote against the legislation.

In 2016, Nuxoll sponsored SB 1342, a bill to establish the Christian Bible as an official state text in schools. Nuxoll's bill stated that the Bible was a good reference book for students learning "astronomy, biology, geology" and other subjects. The bill was strongly criticized by the ACLU of Idaho. The bill was vetoed by Governor Otter—one of the very few times that Otter has used his veto power. The governor noted in his veto message that the state attorney general had concluded that Nuxoll's bill would violate the First Amendment to the United States Constitution, and stated that the bill was in "direct contravention" of a state constitutional provision barring the state from preferring "any religious establishment or mode of worship". The governor also stated that Nuxoll's bill could lead to "costly litigation for Idaho public schools".

In 2012, Nuxoll sponsored legislation to force women to undergo an ultrasound before obtaining an abortion; the measure was unsuccessful. In 2016, Nuxoll sponsored different anti-abortion legislation to require abortion providers to give patients a list of places where they can receive a free ultrasound; these locations are controversial anti-abortion crisis pregnancy centers, which are not required to have medically trained staff and give inaccurate information about the health effects of abortions. The legislation passed the Senate on a 28-7 party-line vote and was signed into law by Governor Butch Otter.

== Personal life ==
Nuxoll is married to her husband Felix and has six children. Nuxoll is a first cousin of retired basketball player and NBA Hall-of-Famer John Stockton.
