= Roger Madsen =

American politician from Idaho

Director of the Idaho Department of Labor
- In office 1995–2013
- Governor: Phil Batt; Dirk Kempthorne; Jim Risch; Butch Otter
- Succeeded by: Ken Edmunds

Member of the Idaho Senate from the 18th district
- In office 1992–1994
- In office 1988–1990
- Succeeded by: Jim Risch

Personal details
- Party: Republican
- Education: Washington State University (BA); Brigham Young University (MA, JD); Arizona State University (MBA)

Roger Madsen is an American attorney and politician who served as the director of the Idaho Department of Labor. Madsen had previously served as a member of the Idaho Senate from 1988 to 1990 and 1992 to 1994.

== Early life and education ==
Madsen is a native of Pullman, Washington. He earned a Bachelor of Arts in political science and French from Washington State University, a Master of Arts in political science from Brigham Young University, a Master of Business Administration from the Thunderbird School of Global Management, and Juris Doctor from the J. Reuben Clark Law School.

== Career ==
From 1976 to 1980, Madsen was an attorney at the Idaho Department of Employment. Madsen was first elected to the Idaho Legislature in 1987. He served one term and was defeated for re-election in 1990. Madsen was later elected to his old seat for another term. In the 1994 Republican primary, Madsen defeated Jim Risch. During his time in the Idaho Senate, Madsen worked as an attorney and business consultant.

In 1995, Madsen was appointed to serve Director of the Idaho Department of Labor by then-Governor Phil Batt. Madsen retired as director in 2013 to pursue philanthropic work in Morocco. Madsen was succeeded by Ken Edmunds.
