= Paul Shepherd (politician) =

American politician and businessman from Idaho

Paul E. Shepherd

Member of the Idaho House of Representatives from the District 7 seat B district
- In office December 1, 2012 – December 1, 2020
- Preceded by: John Rusche
- Succeeded by: Charlie Shepherd

Member of the Idaho House of Representatives from the District 8 seat B district
- In office December 1, 2004 – December 1, 2012
- Preceded by: Charles Cuddy
- Succeeded by: Lenore Hardy Barrett

Personal details
- Born: December 21, 1942 (age 83) Boise, Idaho
- Party: Republican
- Education: Boise Junior College
- Profession: Manager, Shepherd Sawmill and Log Home

Paul E. Shepherd (born December 21, 1942) is an American politician and businessman from Idaho. Shepherd is a Republican former member of Idaho House of Representatives for District 7 seat B. His son, Charlie, succeeded in District 7 seat B.

== Early life ==
On December 21, 1942, Shepherd was born in Boise, Idaho. Shepherd graduated from Boise High School.

== Education ==
Shepherd attended Boise Junior College (later accredited as Boise State University).

== Career ==
Shepherd is a former Partner/Manager of Shepherd Sawmill and Log Homes Incorporated.

On November 2, 2004, Shepherd won the election and became a member of Idaho House of Representatives for District 8 seat B. Shepherd defeated Charles D. Cuddy with 50.2% of the votes. On November 7, 2006, as an incumbent, Shepherd won the election and continued serving District 8 seat B. Shepherd defeated Charlene Douglas with 61.39% of the votes. On November 4, 2008, as an incumbent, Shepherd won the election and continued serving District 8 seat B. Shepherd defeated Jim Rehder with 58.9% of the votes. On November 2, 2010, as an incumbent, Shepherd won the election and continued serving District 8 seat B. Shepherd defeated Jerry Lockhart with 70.2% of the votes.

On November 6, 2012, Shepherd won the election and became a member of Idaho House of Representatives for District 7 seat B. Shepherd defeated Nancy M. Lerandeau with 67.3% of the votes. On November 4, 2014, as an incumbent, Shepherd won the election and continued serving District 7 seat B. On November 8, 2016, as an incumbent, Shepherd won the election unopposed and continued serving District 7 seat B. On November 6, 2018, as an incumbent, Shepherd won the election unopposed and continued serving District 7 seat B.

== Election history ==
District 8 House Seat B - Clearwater, Idaho, Lewis, and Valley County
Year	Candidate	Votes	Pct	Candidate	Votes	Pct
2004 Primary	Paul Shepherd	5,321	100%			
2004 General	Paul Shepherd	8,762	50.2%	Charles Cuddy (incumbent)	8,698	49.8%
2006 Primary	Paul Shepherd (incumbent)	4,103	100%			
2006 General	Paul Shepherd (incumbent)	8,603	61.4%	Charlene Douglas	5,411	38.6%
2008 Primary	Paul Shepherd (incumbent)	4,286	100%			
2008 General	Paul Shepherd (incumbent)	10,979	58.9%	Jim Rehder	7,649	41.1%
2010 Primary	Paul Shepherd (incumbent)	5,110	100%			
2010 General	Paul Shepherd (incumbent)	10,016	70.2%	Jerry Lockhart	4,259	29.8%

District 7 Seat B - Clearwater, Idaho, and Shoshone Counties and part of Bonner County
Year	Candidate	Votes	Pct	Candidate	Votes	Pct
2012 Primary	Paul Shepherd (incumbent)	4,942	100%			
2012 General	Paul Shepherd (incumbent)	12,095	67.3%	Nancy Lerandeau	5,882	32.7%
2014 Primary	Paul Shepherd (incumbent)	4,217	100%			
2014 General	Paul Shepherd (incumbent)	9,216	70.0%	Kenneth Meyers	3,943	30.0%
2016 Primary	Paul Shepherd (incumbent)	3,251	73.2%	Kris Steneck	1,193	26.8%
2016 General	Paul Shepherd (incumbent)	2,253	41.3%			
2018 Primary	Paul Shepherd (incumbent)	3,197	58.7%	Phil Hart	3,197	58.7%

== Personal life ==
Shepherd's wife is Dawn Shepherd. They have nine children. Shepherd and his family live in Riggins, Idaho. Shepherd is a protestant.
