= Colton Bennett =

American politician

Member-elect of the Idaho House of Representatives from the 6A district
- Assuming office December 2026
- Succeeding: Lori McCann

Personal details
- Party: Republican

Colton Bennett is an American politician. A member of the Republican Party, he is the member-elect for the 6A district of the Idaho House of Representatives.
