= Thyra Stevenson =

American politician and pilot (1944–2020)

Member of the Idaho House of Representatives from the 6th district
- In office December 1, 2016 – May 11, 2020
- Preceded by: Dan Rudolph
- Succeeded by: Aaron von Ehlinger
- In office December 1, 2012 – November 30, 2014
- Preceded by: Tom Trail
- Succeeded by: Dan Rudolph

Personal details
- Born: September 4, 1944 Palo Alto, California, U.S.
- Died: May 11, 2020 (aged 75) Coeur d'Alene, Idaho, U.S.
- Party: Republican
- Spouse: Walter Noel Greenham (m. 1978; died 2015)
- Children: 5
- Education: Boston University (BA, BA); New York University (MA); University of Washington (PhD)

Military service
- Allegiance: United States
- Branch/service: United States Coast Guard

Thyra Kay Stevenson (September 4, 1944 – May 11, 2020) was an American politician from Idaho. She was a Republican member of Idaho House of Representatives from District 6 in the A seat, dying in office.

== Early life and education ==
Stevenson was born in Palo Alto, California, and moved to Lewiston, Idaho, with her family at the age of 13 when her father accepted a job with PotlatchDeltic. She graduated from Lewiston High School as her class's valedictorian in 1962. Stevenson earned a Bachelor of Arts degree English and another in Spanish from Boston University. She earned a certificate in Spanish from the New York University of Madrid in Spain, a Master of Arts in Spanish literature from New York University, and a PhD in Latin American literature from the University of Washington.

== Career ==
Stevenson began flying when she was a child. As an experienced pilot, she flew planes such as DC-3s, Convairs, Boeing 727 cargo and passenger planes.

Stevenson served in the military as an aircraft commander, Flotilla commander, and pilot instructor in the United States Coast Guard. Stevenson was also a chief information officer in the AuxAir Squadron. She was a professor of Spanish at University of Washington.

On November 6, 2012, Stevenson won the election and became a Republican member of Idaho House of Representatives for District 6 seat A. Stevenson defeated Pete Gertonson with 54.2% of the votes.

On November 4, 2014, Stevenson was defeated by Dan Rudolf with 49.9% of the votes.

On November 8, 2016, Stevenson was re-elected to her old seat in the Idaho House of Representatives. Stevenson defeated Bob Blakely with 56.55% of the votes.

Stevenson was the vice-chair of the Revenue and Taxation Committee. She died of heart problems while in office and Republican Governor Brad Little appointed Aaron von Ehlinger to the remainder of her term.

== Elections ==
District 6 House Seat A - Lewis and Nez Perce Counties
Year	Candidate	Votes	Pct	Candidate	Votes	Pct
2012 Primary	Thyra Stevenson	2,566	100%			
2012 General	Thyra Stevenson	9,814	54.2%	Pete Gertonson	8,294	45.8%
2014 Primary	Thyra Stevenson (incumbent)	1,938	100%			
2014 General	Dan Rudolph	6,230	50.1%	Thyra Stevenson (incumbent)	6,205	49.9%
2016 Primary	Thyra Stevenson	2,148	100%			
2016 General	Thyra Stevenson	10,600	56.6%	Bob Blakey	8,144	43.4%

== Personal life and death ==
In 1978, Stevenson married Walter Noel Greenham (1941–2015), a Navy veteran and computer engineer. She had five children. Stevenson lived in California, until returning to Lewiston, Idaho after retirement. Stevenson served on the Lewiston City Council.

Stevenson died on May 11, 2020, at age 75, from complications of a heart attack she suffered a week prior.
