= Senator Brand =

Senator Brand may refer to:

- Charles H. Brand (1861–1933), Georgia State Senate
- Charles Brand (Ohio politician) (1871–1966), Ohio State Senate
- William H. Brand (1824–1891), New York State Senate

== See also ==
- Senator Brandt (disambiguation)
