= Cindy Carlson =

American politician and businesswoman

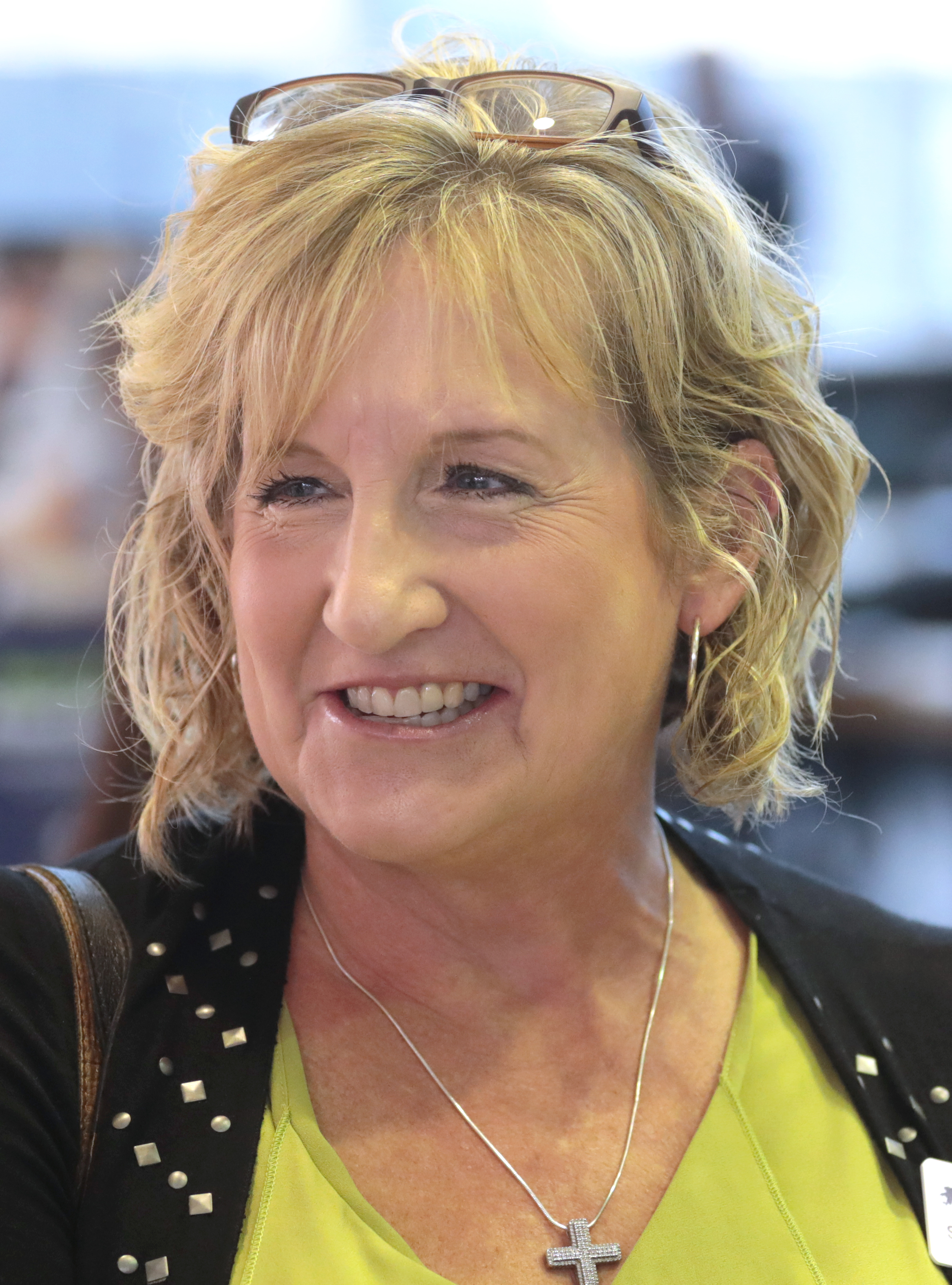

Member of the Idaho Senate from the 7th district
- Incumbent
- Assumed office December 1, 2022
- Preceded by: Carl Crabtree

Personal details
- Born: California, U.S.
- Party: Republican
- Spouse: Guy Carlson
- Children: 4

Cindy J. Carlson is an American politician and businesswoman serving as a member of the Idaho Senate for the 7th district. Elected in November 2022, she assumed office on December 1, 2022.

== Early life and education ==
Carlson was born in California and raised in Riggins, Idaho. She graduated from Salmon River High School and took courses at Treasure Valley Community College in Ontario, Oregon.

== Career ==
Outside of politics, Carlson owns a business that provides helicopters for tourism, power line construction, fire fighting, construction, and agricultural services. She was elected to the Idaho Senate in November 2022, after having beaten incumbent Carl Crabtree in the Republican primary.
