= Shannon McMillan =

American politician from Idaho

Member of the Idaho House of Representatives
- In office December 1, 2010 – December 1, 2016
- Preceded by: Mary Lou Shepherd
- Succeeded by: Priscilla Giddings
- Constituency: 2nd district Seat A (2010-2012); 7th district Seat A (2012-2016)

Personal details
- Born: December 16, 1960 (age 65) Waupaca, Wisconsin
- Party: Republican
- Occupation: Politician

Shannon McMillan (born December 16, 1960) is a former Republican Idaho State Representative representing District 7 from 2012 to 2016. She also served District 2 in the A seat from 2010-2012.

== Early life ==
On December 16, 1960, McMillan was born in Waupaca, Wisconsin. McMillan's father is Melvin Guenther, a railroad worker. McMillan's mother is Margaret Guenther, an accountant. McMillan graduated from Mount Baker High School.

== Education ==
McMillan attended East Kootenay Community College.

== Career ==
McMillan was defeated for renomination in the Republican primary in 2016 by Priscilla Giddings, who went on to win her seat.

On March 30, 2017, McMillan announced her intentions via social media that she planned to run for her seat again in 2018. McMillan again lost renomination to Giddings.

=== Committee assignments ===
- Agricultural Affairs Committee from 2010 to 2016
- Judiciary, Rules, and Administration Committee from 2010 to 2016
- State Affairs Committee from 2012 to 2016

== Election history ==
District 2 Seat A - Benewah and Shoshone Counties and part of Bonner and Kootenai Counties.
Year	Candidate	Votes	Pct	Candidate	Votes	Pct
2010 Primary	Shannon McMillan	1,708	100%			
2010 General	Shannon McMillan	6,244	54.9%	Mary Lou Shepherd (incumbent)	5,126	45.1%

District 7 Seat A - Clearwater, Idaho, and Shoshone Counties and a portion of Bonner County.
Year	Candidate	Votes	Pct	Candidate	Votes	Pct	Candidate	Votes	Pct
2012 Primary	Shannon McMillan (incumbent)	2,564	47.8%	Rex Rammell	1,625	30.3%	Ed Galloway	1,178	21.9%
2012 General	Shannon McMillan (incumbent)	11,561	64.9%	Casey Drews	6,263	35.1%			
2014 Primary	Shannon McMillan (incumbent)	2,822	63.6 %	Shauna Hillman	1,614	36.4 %			
2014 General	Shannon McMillan (incumbent)	8,757	66.6 %	Jessica Chilcott	4,834	33.4 %			
2016 Primary	Shannon McMillan (incumbent)	1,798	38.7%	Priscilla Giddings	2,848	61.3%			
2018 Primary	Shannon McMillan	1,798	20.9%	Priscilla Giddings (incumbent)	3,125	56.1%	Ryan A. Lawrence	1,276	22.9%

== Personal life ==
McMillan's husband is Kenneth. They have one child. McMillan and her family live in Silverton, Idaho.
