= Carl Crabtree =

American politician and rancher (1952–2025)

Member of the Idaho Senate from the 7th district
- In office December 1, 2016 – November 30, 2022
- Preceded by: Sheryl Nuxoll
- Succeeded by: Cindy Carlson

Personal details
- Born: May 17, 1952 Lassen County, California, U.S.
- Died: May 6, 2025 (aged 72) Boise, Idaho, U.S.
- Party: Republican
- Education: University of Idaho (BS)

Carl Gordon Crabtree (May 17, 1952 – May 6, 2025) was an American rancher and politician who served as a member of the Idaho Senate for the 7th district from 2016 to 2022.

== Early life ==
Crabtree was raised on a ranch in Kooskia and graduated from Clearwater Valley High School. In 1974, Crabtree earned a Bachelor of Science degree in plant science from the University of Idaho.

== Career ==
Crabtree was a rancher in Idaho. From 1974 to his retirement in 2015, he worked for Idaho County as 4-H program manager, as extension educator and weed supervisor. He continued to work in livestock production, having served in the Idaho Cattle Association, serving as president from 1991 to 1992, and on the Idaho Beef Council, serving as chairman from 2001 to 2002.

In 2016, Crabtree challenged eight-year incumbent Senator Sheryl Nuxoll in the Republican primary. Nuxoll gained national notoriety in 2015 for calling Hinduism "a false faith with false gods" and joining two other senators in skipping the invocation offered in the Senate by a guest Hindu chaplain. Crabtree narrowly defeated Nuxoll for the Republican nomination, and defeated Ken Meyers, a retired veterinary medicine professor from Sagle, in the general election.

In 2022, Crabtree lost the Republican primary to Cindy Carlson. Following this, he worked for the Idaho State Department of Education in intergovernmental affairs.

== Elections ==
District 7 Senate - Clearwater, Idaho, Shoshone Counties and part of Bonner County
Year	Candidate	Votes	Pct	Candidate	Votes	Pct
2016 Primary	Carl Crabtree	2,494	51.1%	Sheryl Nuxoll (Incumbent)	2,383	48.9%
2016 General	Carl Crabtree	14,318	73.8%	Ken Meyers	5,071	26.2%

== Personal life and death ==
Crabtree's wife was Carolyn Crabtree. Crabtree and his family lived in Grangeville, Idaho. He died on May 6, 2025, due to complications from brain cancer, having previously beaten esophageal cancer in 2022. Crabtree was 72.
