= Sheila Sorensen =

American politician from Idaho

Member of the Idaho Senate from the 18th district
- In office December 1, 2002 – December 1, 2004
- Preceded by: Jim Risch
- Succeeded by: Kate Kelly

Member of the Idaho Senate from the 13th district
- In office December 1, 1992 – December 1, 2002
- Succeeded by: Patti Anne Lodge

Member of the Idaho House of Representatives from the 21st district
- In office 1987 – December 1, 1992
- Preceded by: Dean Sorensen
- Succeeded by: Pattie Nafziger

Personal details
- Born: September 20, 1947 (age 78) Chicago, Illinois
- Party: Republican

Sheila Sorensen (born September 20, 1947) is an American politician who served in the Idaho House of Representatives from the 21st district from 1987 to 1992 and in the Idaho Senate from 1992 to 2004.

== Elections ==
=== Idaho First Congressional District ===
==== 2006 ====
Sorensen took third in the Republican primary to replace Butch Otter as Idaho Congressman from District 1 taking only 18.3% losing to Bill Sali.

=== Idaho Senate District 18 ===
==== 2002 ====
Sorensen was unopposed in the Republican primary. Sorensen defeated Independent candidate Robert McMinn with 67.9% of the vote in the general election.

=== Idaho Senate District 13 ===
==== 2000 ====
Sorensen was unopposed in the Republican primary and the general election.

==== 1998 ====
Sorensen defeated David Baumann in the Republican primary with 61.8% of the vote. Sorensen was unopposed for the general election.

==== 1996 ====
Sorensen was unopposed in the Republican primary. Sorensen defeated Democratic nominee Penny Fletcher with 66.8% of the vote in the general election.

==== 1994 ====
Sorensen was unopposed in the Republican primary. Sorensen defeated Democratic nominee Marilyn Sword with 58.4% of the vote in the general election.

==== 1992 ====
Sorensen defeated Irene Baumann in the Republican primary. Sorensen defeated Democratic nominee Kelly Buckland in the general election.

=== Idaho House of Representatives District 21 Seat B ===
==== 1990 ====
Sorensen was unopposed in the Republican primary. Sorensen defeated Democratic nominee Judith Hagan in the general election.
