= Brandon Mitchell (politician) =

American businessman and politician

Member of the Idaho House of Representatives from the 6th district
- Incumbent
- Assumed office December 1, 2020
- Preceded by: Bill Goesling

Personal details
- Party: Republican
- Education: Clearfield High School; Weber State University
- Alma mater: Brigham Young University–Idaho (BBA)
- Occupation: Candura Corporation dba Jiffy Lube Owner Operator; Scuba instructor

Brandon Mitchell is an American businessman and politician, serving as a member of the Idaho House of Representatives from the 6th district. Elected in November 2020 (5th district), he assumed office on December 1, 2020. Following re-districting in 2022, Mitchell was re-elected in the 6th district which includes Latah, Lewis, and part of Nez Perce Counties.

== Early life and education ==
Mitchell was raised in Syracuse, Utah, and graduated from Clearfield High School. After attending Weber State University, Mitchell earned a Bachelor of Business Administration from Brigham Young University–Idaho.

== Career ==
From 1989 to 1999, Mitchell managed a Jiffy Lube location in Portland, Oregon. He later became a district manager for the company. Since 2015, he has also worked as a scuba instructor. Mitchell and his wife co-own Candura Corporation, a holding company that operates two Jiffy Lube franchises in Idaho.

== Political career ==
Mitchell was an unsuccessful candidate for a seat on the Moscow, Idaho City Council in 2019. He was elected to the Idaho House of Representatives in November 2020 and assumed office on December 1, 2020, succeeding Bill Goesling.

== Electoral history ==
2019

Moscow Idaho City Council, Non-partisan election, 2019
Party	Candidate	Votes	%
Nonpartisan	Maureen Laflin	4,379	24.7%
Nonpartisan	Anne Zabala	4,288	24.1%
Nonpartisan	Sandra Kelly	4,172	23.5%
Nonpartisan	Brandon Mitchell	1,670	9.4
Nonpartisan	James Urquidez	1,648	9.3
Nonpartisan	Kelsey Berends	1,605	9.0

2020

Latah County Republican Precinct Committeeman, Precinct 5 election, 2020
Party	Candidate	Votes	%
Republican	Brandon Mitchell	101	78.9
Republican	Alexander Navarro	27	21.1
Total votes		128	100.0

Idaho House District 5A, Republican primary election, 2020
Party	Candidate	Votes	%
Republican	Brandon Mitchell	2,883	57.8
Republican	Hari Heath	2,107	42.2
Total votes		4,990	100.0

Idaho House District 5A election, 2020
Party	Candidate	Votes	%
Republican	Brandon Mitchell	13,888	55.4
Democratic	Dulce Kersting-Lark	11,180	44.6
Total votes		25,068	100.0

2022

Idaho House District 6B, Republican Primary election, 2022
Party	Candidate	Votes	%
Republican	Brandon Mitchell (incumbent)	5,162	100.0
Total votes		5,162	100.0

Idaho House District 6B election, 2022
Party	Candidate	Votes	%
Republican	Brandon Mitchell (incumbent)	11,318	55.8
Democratic	Tim Gresback	8,954	44.2
Total votes		20,272	100.0

2024

Idaho House District 6B, Republican Primary election, 2024
Party	Candidate	Votes	%
Republican	Brandon Mitchell (incumbent)	5,088	100.0
Total votes		5,088	100.0
