= Idaho Property Tax Relief Act of 2006 =

The Idaho Property Tax Relief Act of 2006 was passed on August 25, 2006. It was proposed by Idaho governor Jim Risch to be addressed in a special session of the Idaho Legislature.

The legislation would do the following:

- Reduce property taxes by $260 million by eliminating the public schools maintenance and operation levy on Idaho real property. About 60% of the tax relief would go to businesses, 40% to residential property owners.
- Raise the Idaho sales tax $210 million, to six percent, effective October 1, 2006
- Place $100 million into the Public Education Stabilization Fund; and
- Place an advisory question on the November general election ballot asking Idaho voters if they agree with the property tax relief adopted by the legislature in August

In November 2006, the Act was overwhelming approved by voters with 72% voting in favor.

In May 2008, state economist Mike Ferguson estimated that the net tax cut was about $30 million.
