= Skip Brandt =

American politician from Idaho

Member of the Idaho County Board of Commissioners
- Incumbent
- Assumed office 2007

Member of the Idaho Senate from the 8th district
- In office December 1, 2000 – December 1, 2006
- Preceded by: Margaret McGlaughlin
- Succeeded by: Leland G. Heinrich

Personal details
- Born: May 26, 1964 (age 62) Grangeville, Idaho, U.S.
- Party: Republican

Skip Brandt (born May 26, 1964) is an American politician and businessman who served as a member of the Idaho Senate from 2000 to 2006. A Republican, Brandt has since served as a member of the Idaho County, Idaho Commission.

== Early life ==
Brandt was born in Grangeville, Idaho and raised in Kooskia, Idaho.

== Career ==
Prior to serving as a member of the Idaho Senate, Brandt was mayor of Kooskia. Brandt was elected to the Senate in 2000 and assumed office in 2001, succeeding Marguerite McLaughlin. He served until 2006 and was succeeded by Leland G. Heinrich. During his tenure in the Senate, Brandt served as chair of the Health and Welfare Committee his second term and chair of the Transportation Committee during his third term. In addition to his career in politics, Brandt owns and operates a hardware store.

In March 2020, Brandt was appointed to the Western Interstate Region Board. He has served as a member of the Idaho County Commission since 2007. During the 2016 United States Senate election in Idaho, Brandt served as incumbent Senator Mike Crapo's Idaho County campaign chair.

Brandt was the first Idaho elected official to endorse and support Donald Trump during the 2016 Republican Party presidential primaries served as a delegate to the 2016 Republican National Convention. In the 2020 election, Brandt was nominated to serve as a Trump delegate to the 2020 Republican National Convention.
