= Jeff Nesset =

American politician and businessman from Idaho

Member of the Idaho House of Representatives from the 7A district
- In office December 2010 – December 2012
- Preceded by: Liz Chavez
- Succeeded by: Dan G. Johnson

Mayor of Lewiston, Idaho
- In office 1998–2007

Personal details
- Born: September 13, 1952 (age 74) Culbertson, Montana
- Party: Republican
- Spouse: Teri Nesset
- Children: 3
- Education: Montana State University
- Occupation: Politician, Senior vice president

Jeff Nesset (born September 13, 1952) is an American businessman and former politician from Idaho. Nesset was a Republican member of Idaho House of Representatives and former mayor of Lewiston, Idaho.

== Early life ==
On September 13, 1952, Nesset was born in Culbertson, Montana.

== Education ==
Nesset earned a bachelor's degree in business management from Montana State University.

== Career ==
In 1981, Nesset joined D.A. Davidson. Nesset is a certified financial advisor and Senior Vice President with D.A. Davidson in Lewiston, Idaho.

In 1996, Nesset joined the city council of Lewiston, Idaho. In 1998, Nesset became the mayor of Lewiston, Idaho.

On November 2, 2010, Nesset won the election and became a member of Idaho House of Representatives for District 7, seat A. Nesset defeated Liz Chavez with 54.6% of the votes.

On May 15, 2012, Nesset ran for a redistricted District 6 open senate seat unsuccessfully during the Republican Primary. Nesset was defeated by Dan G. Johnson with 59.6% of the votes.

== Awards ==
- Bragg Lewis Knutson Community Service Award.
- 2019 Ian B. Davidson Cultural Excellence Award.

== Personal life ==
Nesset's wife is Teri Nesset. They have three children.
