= Lori McCann =

American politician

Member of the Idaho House of Representatives from the 6A district
- Incumbent
- Assumed office May 17, 2021
- Preceded by: Aaron von Ehlinger
- Succeeded by: Colton Bennett (elect)

Personal details
- Party: Republican
- Spouse: Bill
- Children: 4
- Education: University of Idaho (BS)

Lori Trigsted McCann is an American politician serving as a member of the Idaho House of Representatives from the 6A district. McCann assumed office on May 17, 2021, appointed by Governor Brad Little to succeed Aaron von Ehlinger.

== Early life and education ==
A native of Lewiston, Idaho, McCann graduated from Lewiston High School. She then earned a Bachelor of Science degree in education from the University of Idaho.

== Career ==
Prior to entering politics, McCann was the director of paralegal and legal assistant programs at Lewis–Clark State College. She also helped manage her family's law firm and McCann Ranch and Livestock Co., a livestock and commercial real estate business.

== Electoral history ==
2022

Nez Perce County Republican Precinct Committeeman, Precinct 19 election, 2022
Party	Candidate	Votes	%
Republican	Lori McCann (incumbent)	115	47.9
Republican	Marvin F. Dugger	83	34.6
Republican	Elaine Selberg	23	9.6
Republican	Vernon L. Williams	19	7.9
Total votes		240	100.0

Idaho House District 6A, Republican primary election, 2022
Party	Candidate	Votes	%
Republican	Lori McCann (incumbent)	3,749	61.1
Republican	Claudia Dalby	2,385	38.9
Total votes		6,134	100.0

Idaho House District 6A election, 2022
Party	Candidate	Votes	%
Republican	Lori McCann (incumbent)	11,982	59.5
Democratic	Trish Carter-Goodheart	8,158	40.5
Total votes		20,140	100.0

2024

Nez Perce County Republican Precinct Committeeman, Precinct 19 election, 2024
Party	Candidate	Votes	%
Republican	Elaine Selberg	127	56.4
Republican	Lori McCann (incumbent)	98	43.6
Total votes		225	100.0

Idaho House District 6A, Republican primary election, 2024
Party	Candidate	Votes	%
Republican	Lori McCann (incumbent)	2,814	43.6
Republican	Colton Bennett	2,614	40.5
Republican	David Dalby	1,022	15.8
Total votes		6,450	100.0
