= Aaron von Ehlinger =

American convicted former Idaho politician

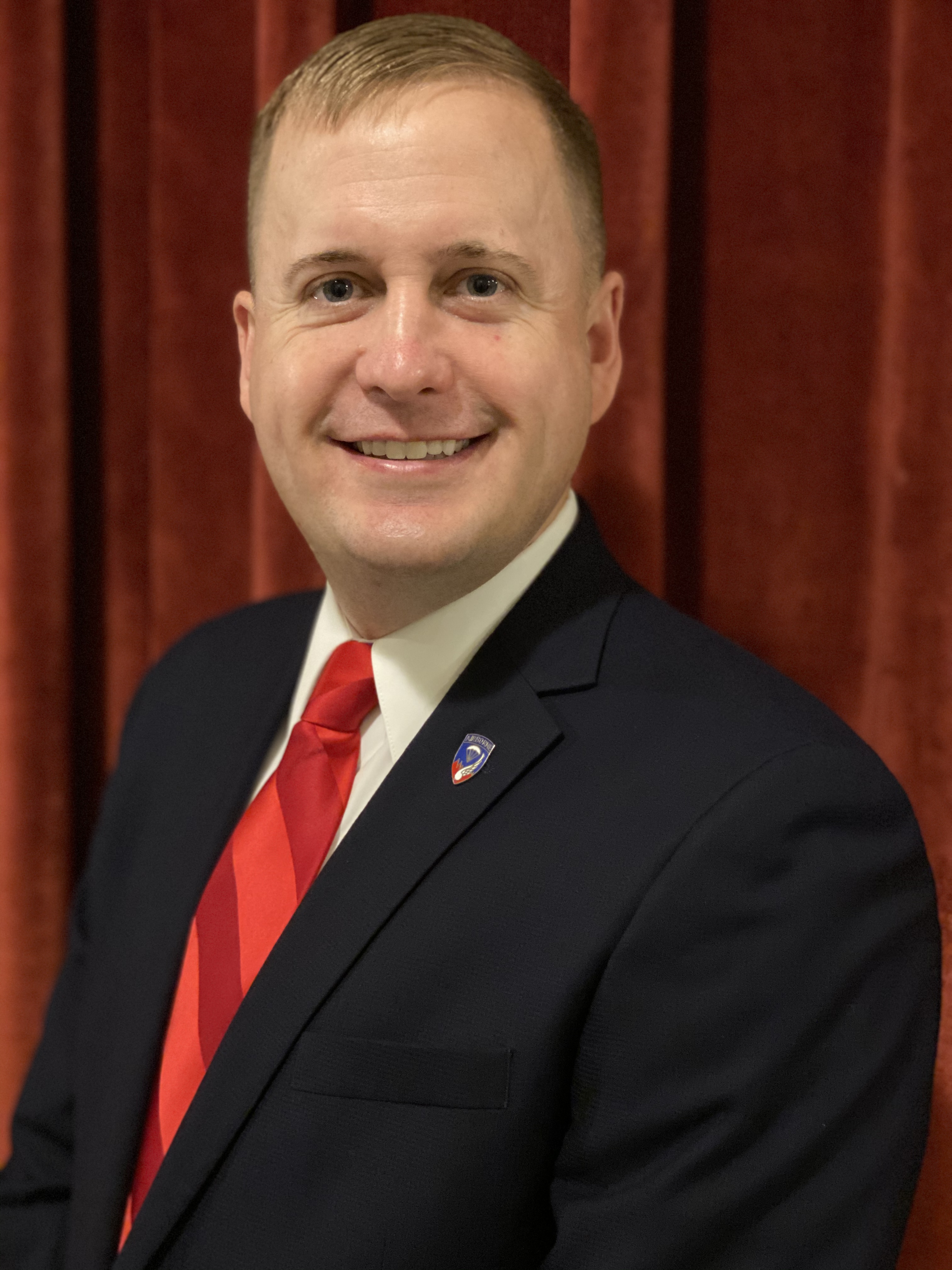

Member of the Idaho House of Representatives from the 6th district
- In office June 3, 2020 – April 29, 2021
- Preceded by: Thyra Stevenson
- Succeeded by: Lori McCann

Personal details
- Born: Aaron Anson Ehlinger; May 7, 1982 (age 44) Orofino, Idaho, U.S.
- Party: Republican
- Education: University of Alabama (BA)

Military service
- Branch/service: United States Army
- Battles/wars: War in Afghanistan

Aaron von Ehlinger (born Aaron Anson Ehlinger; May 7, 1982) is an American former politician and convicted sex offender who served as a member of the Idaho House of Representatives from the 6th district. He was appointed to the House by Republican Governor Brad Little on June 3, 2020, and resigned on April 29, 2021. In 2022, he was convicted of raping a legislative intern, and was sentenced to 20 years in prison for the crime.

== Early life and education ==
Von Ehlinger was born and raised in Orofino, Idaho. He earned a Bachelor of Arts degree in political science from the University of Alabama.

== Career ==
Von Ehlinger served in the United States Army, where he was deployed to Afghanistan after the September 11 attacks. After leaving the Army, von Ehlinger has worked as a substitute teacher and real estate developer. He was appointed to the Idaho House of Representatives by Governor Brad Little on June 3, 2020, filling the seat left vacant after the death of Thyra Stevenson.

Von Ehlinger sponsored a bill to restrict the government's ability to place public art. The bill (HB 311) was presented to the House Revenue & Taxation Committee. He claimed that the government displaying public art was a waste of the taxpayer's money.

== Rape conviction ==
In April 2021, von Ehlinger was accused of "unconsented sexual contact" with a teenage legislative intern. Von Ehlinger denied the allegations, stating that the encounter was consensual. The Idaho House Ethics Committee and Boise Police Department later began investigations into the allegations. In August 2021, after the allegations surfaced, another Republican house member, Priscilla Giddings, from White Bird, Idaho, exposed Ehlinger's victim's identity on social media, emailing it to constituents, with right-wing blogs subsequently posting the girl's name and her photo online.

It was later reported that Legislature Ethics Committee documents disclosed previous complaints against von Ehlinger for unwanted advances toward female employees; von Ehlinger had been warned about this behavior. After the House Ethics Committee voted unanimously to recommend that von Ehlinger be expelled from the House, he resigned from his position on April 29, 2021.

On September 25, 2021, von Ehlinger was arrested in Atlanta after returning to the U.S. from Central America, where he had been since May 2021. On October 8, 2021, von Ehlinger was arrested on felony charges of rape and forcible penetration after being extradited to Idaho and booked into the Ada County Jail. He was released the same day.

On April 29, 2022, von Ehlinger was found guilty on the charge of rape and acquitted on the charge of forcible penetration. On August 31, 2022, von Ehlinger was sentenced to 20 years in prison for the crime. He will be required to serve at least eight years before being eligible for parole, and to register as a sex offender after he is released.
