= Idaho Department of Labor =

State agency in Idaho, United States

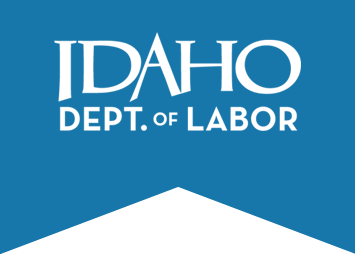

Agency overview
- Jurisdiction: State of Idaho
- Headquarters: 317 W Main St, Boise, Idaho 83735
- Employees: 618 (2022)
- Agency executive: Jani Revier, Director
- Website: www.labor.idaho.gov

The Idaho Department of Labor is a state agency in Idaho. The agency is responsible for economic development, labor relations, workforce, technology, volunteerism, and workforce development. It also processes requests for unemployment benefits and unemployment insurance. The agency is managed by the Idaho Director of Labor who is selected by the governor of Idaho.
