= Charlie Shepherd =

American politician

Member of the Idaho House of Representatives from the 7th district
- Incumbent
- Assumed office December 1, 2020
- Preceded by: Paul Shepherd

Personal details
- Party: Republican
- Relations: Paul Shepherd (father)

Charles Shepherd is an American Republican politician serving in the Idaho House of Representatives from the 7th district. He was elected to the seat after incumbent Republican Paul Shepherd, his father, decided not to run for re-election after holding the seat from 2012 to 2020. He ran unopposed in the general election.

== Early life and career ==
Shepherd grew up in Garden Valley, Idaho and his family moved to Riggins, Idaho his senior year where he graduated from Salmon River High School in 1986. After high school he attended Boise State and walked-on for the Broncos football team. Following his completion of college, he returned to Riggins where he worked in the family sawmill. He coached several sports at his alma mater, winning five state football championships, before stepping down in 2018.

In 2021, he voted against the use of federal funds for early education, arguing that it would make it "easier for mothers to come out of the home and let somebody else raise their child, [and] I just don't think that's a good direction for us to be going."
