= Jim Risch =

American lawyer and politician (born 1943)

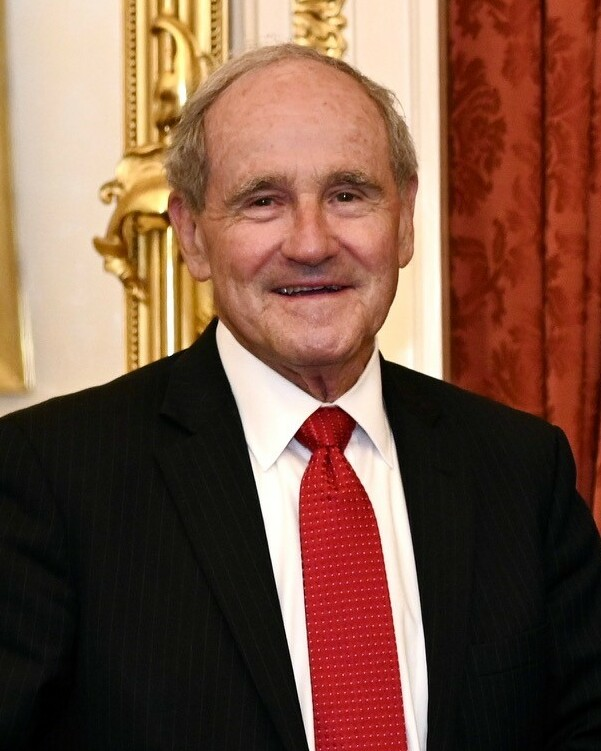
- Risch in 2021

United States Senator from Idaho
- Incumbent
- Assumed office January 3, 2009 Serving with Mike Crapo
- Preceded by: Larry Craig
Committee positions
Chair of the Senate Foreign Relations Committee
Incumbent
Assumed office January 3, 2025
Preceded by	Ben Cardin
In office January 3, 2019 – February 3, 2021
Preceded by	Bob Corker
Succeeded by	Bob Menendez
Ranking Member of the Senate Foreign Relations Committee
In office February 3, 2021 – January 3, 2025
Preceded by	Bob Menendez
Succeeded by	Jeanne Shaheen
Chair of the Senate Small Business Committee
In office January 3, 2017 – January 3, 2019
Preceded by	David Vitter
Succeeded by	Marco Rubio

31st Governor of Idaho
- In office May 26, 2006 – January 1, 2007
- Lieutenant: Mark Ricks
- Preceded by: Dirk Kempthorne
- Succeeded by: Butch Otter

39th & 41st Lieutenant Governor of Idaho
- In office January 1, 2007 – January 3, 2009
- Governor: Butch Otter
- Preceded by: Mark Ricks
- Succeeded by: Brad Little
- In office January 3, 2003 – May 26, 2006
- Governor: Dirk Kempthorne
- Preceded by: Jack Riggs
- Succeeded by: Mark Ricks
State Senate positions
Majority Leader of the Idaho Senate
In office December 1, 1996 – November 30, 2002
Preceded by	Bruce Newcomb
Succeeded by	Bart Davis
36th President pro tempore of the Idaho Senate
In office December 1, 1982 – November 30, 1988
Preceded by	Reed Budge
Succeeded by	Mike Crapo

Member of the Idaho Senate
- In office January 28, 1995 – December 1, 2002
- Preceded by: Roger Madsen
- Succeeded by: Sheila Sorensen
- Constituency: 18th district
- In office December 1, 1974 – December 1, 1988
- Preceded by: District established
- Succeeded by: Mike Burkett
- Constituency: 21st district

Personal details
- Born: James Elroy Risch; May 3, 1943 (age 83) Milwaukee, Wisconsin, U.S.
- Party: Republican
- Spouse: Vicki Risch (m. 1968)
- Children: 3
- Education: University of Wisconsin, Milwaukee (attended); University of Idaho (BS, JD)
- Website: Senate website Campaign website
- Risch's voice Risch on the responsibilities of Deputy Secretary of State; Recorded February 16, 2023

James Elroy Risch (/ˈrɪʃ/ RISH; born May 3, 1943) is an American lawyer and politician who has served as the junior United States senator from Idaho since 2009. A member of the Republican Party, he served as lieutenant governor of Idaho under governors Dirk Kempthorne and Butch Otter, and briefly as governor between their terms.

Raised in Milwaukee, Risch moved to Idaho in the early 1960s. After graduating from the University of Idaho, he received a B.S. degree in forestry in 1965 and earned a J.D. in 1968. Afterward, he taught criminal law at Boise State University, and in 1970 was elected as Ada County prosecuting attorney. He was elected to the Idaho Senate in 1974 and was a member until 1988. In 1995, he was appointed to the state Senate, where he served until 2002.

Risch ran for lieutenant governor of Idaho in 2002, defeating incumbent Jack Riggs in the primary. After incumbent governor Dirk Kempthorne resigned to become the United States secretary of the interior in May 2006, Risch served out the rest of Kempthorne's term. He then served as lieutenant governor under Butch Otter from 2007 to 2009. Risch was elected to the U.S. Senate in 2008 and reelected in 2014, 2020, and 2026.

== Early life and education ==
Born in Milwaukee, Wisconsin, Risch is the son of Helen B. (née Levi) and Elroy A. Risch, a lineman for Wisconsin Bell. Risch attended the University of Wisconsin–Milwaukee from 1961 to 1963 and then transferred to the University of Idaho in Moscow, where he was a member of the Phi Delta Theta fraternity. He obtained a B.S. degree in forestry in 1965, and continued his education at the university's College of Law. He served on the Law Review and the College of Law Advisory Committee before receiving a J.D. degree in 1968.

Risch entered politics in 1970 in Boise at age 27, winning election as Ada County Prosecuting Attorney. While serving in this capacity, he taught undergraduate classes in criminal justice at Boise State College and served as the president of the state's prosecuting attorneys' association. Concurrent with his service in the Idaho Senate, Risch became a millionaire as one of Idaho's most successful trial lawyers.

== State politics ==
=== Idaho Senate ===
Risch was first elected to the Idaho Senate from Ada County in 1974. He entered the state senate leadership in 1976, serving as majority leader and later as president pro tempore.

In a dramatic upset, Risch was defeated for reelection in 1988 by Democratic political newcomer and Boise attorney Mike Burkett.

In the second political defeat of his career, Risch lost the 1994 primary election for a state Senate seat to Roger Madsen. Later that year Risch chaired Governor-elect Phil Batt's transition team, and after Batt took office he appointed Risch to the seat vacated by Madsen, who had been named as the director of the Department of Labor, then known as the Department of Employment. In 1996, Risch was elected Senate Majority Leader after defeating fellow Boise Republican Sheila Sorensen.

=== 39th lieutenant governor (2003–2006) ===
In January 2001, Risch had his eye on the lieutenant governor's seat vacated by Butch Otter, who resigned after being elected to Congress, but Governor Dirk Kempthorne appointed state Senator Jack Riggs of Coeur d'Alene to the post instead. The next year, Risch defeated Riggs in the Republican primary and won the general election, spending $360,000 of his own money on the campaign.

=== 31st governor of Idaho (2006–2007) ===
On May 26, 2006, Risch became governor of Idaho when Kempthorne resigned to become U.S. secretary of the interior. Risch appointed Mark Ricks to serve as his lieutenant governor.

Upon taking office, Risch eliminated Idaho's bureau office in Washington D.C. and replaced it with offices in Idaho Falls and Coeur d'Alene. In August 2006, he called a special session of the Idaho Legislature to consider his proposed property tax reform bill, the Property Tax Relief Act of 2006. In December, he issued an executive order that mandated state agencies to verify whether new employees are legal citizens.

Risch was initially expected to enter the 2006 Republican gubernatorial primary to succeed Kempthorne, who was completing his second term at this time of his federal appointment. But U.S. Representative Butch Otter had already announced his candidacy to replace Kempthorne and gained a significant head start in campaigning and fundraising. In November 2005, Risch announced his intention to seek election again as lieutenant governor. He served out the remaining seven months of Kempthorne's term, which ended in January 2007.

=== 41st lieutenant governor (2007–2009) ===
Risch was unopposed for the 2006 Republican nomination for lieutenant governor and defeated former Democratic U.S. representative Larry LaRocco in the general election. Risch's term as governor ended in January 2007 and he returned to the role of lieutenant governor. He resigned as lieutenant governor to take his seat in the Senate on January 3, 2009. Otter named state Senator Brad Little of Emmett as Risch's successor.

== U.S. Senate ==
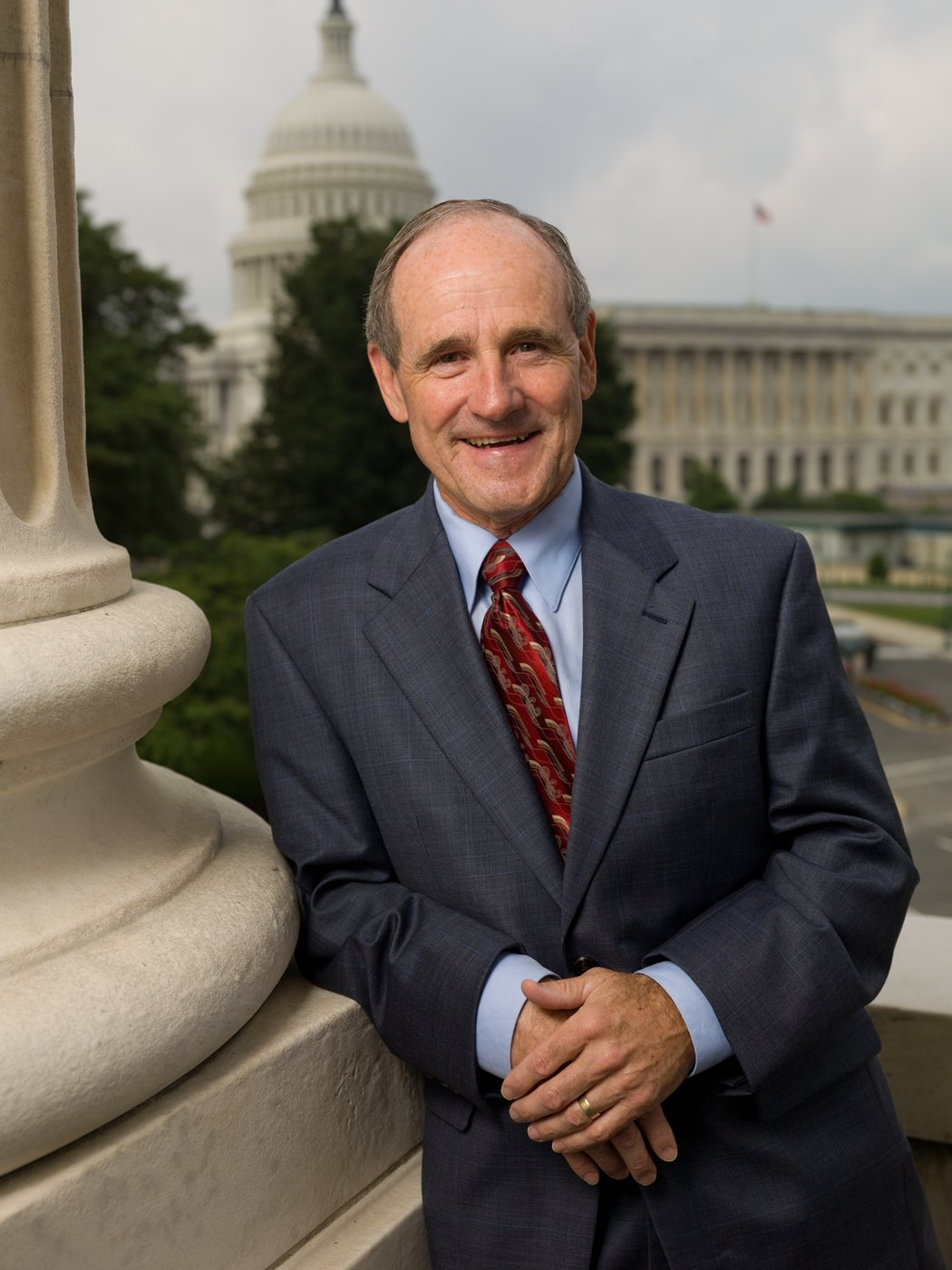
Risch's official portrait, 2009

=== Elections ===
==== 2008 ====
On August 31, 2007, the Associated Press reported that Governor Otter might appoint Risch to the United States Senate to succeed the embattled Larry Craig. On September 1, the Idaho Statesman reported that Otter's spokesman denied Risch had been selected and that Otter had "made no decision and he is not leaning toward anybody." On October 9, Risch announced that he would run for the Senate seat. In May 2008, Risch was nominated as the Republican candidate for U.S. Senate. In the general election he defeated former Democratic Congressman Larry LaRocco with 58% of the vote.

==== 2014 ====
Risch won the Republican primary with 79.9% of the vote and defeated attorney Nels Mitchell in the general election with 65.3% of the vote.

==== 2020 ====
Risch was unopposed in the 2020 Republican primary. He defeated Democratic nominee Paulette Jordan in the general election with 63% of the vote.

==== 2026 ====
Risch won the Republican primary with 67.3% of the vote. In the general election, he defeated independent candidates Todd Achilles and Natalie Fleming with 56.5% of the vote.

=== Tenure ===
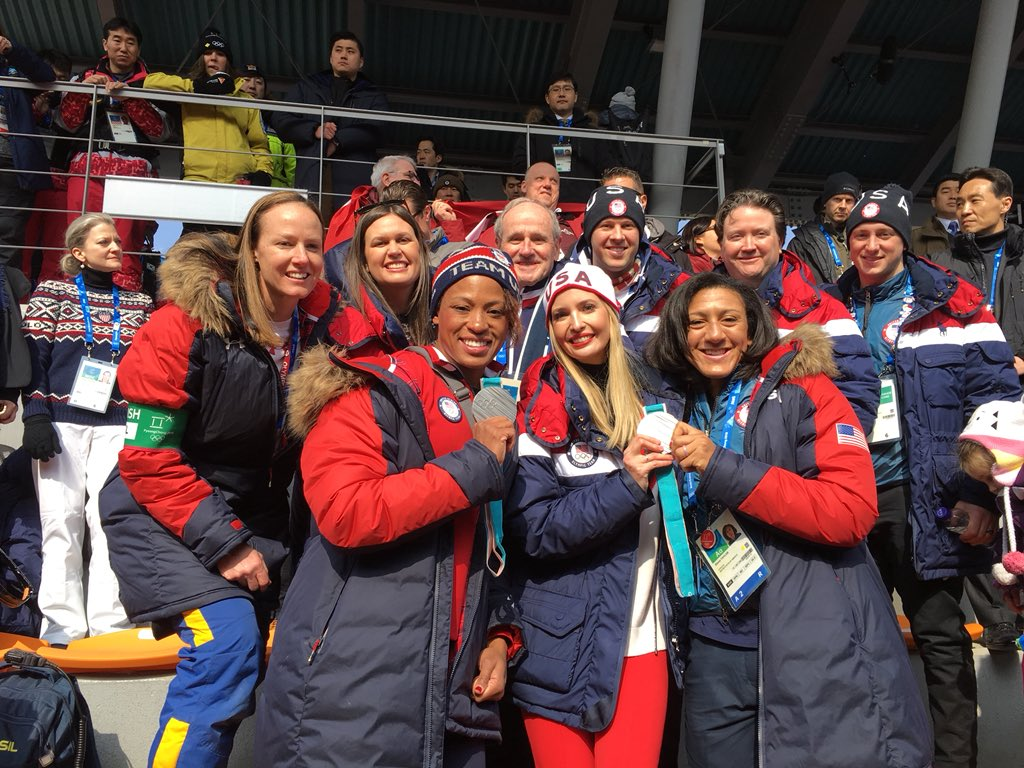
Risch with Ivanka Trump, Lauren Gibbs and Shauna Rohbock at the 2018 Winter Olympics in Pyeongchang, South Korea

==== 2000s ====
Risch was one of four freshmen Republican senators in the 111th Congress of 2009, with Mike Johanns of Nebraska, George LeMieux of Florida and Scott Brown of Massachusetts. Republican Senator Mike Crapo of Idaho called Risch "results-oriented".

==== 2010s ====
In 2017, Risch was one of 22 senators to sign a letter to President Donald Trump urging him to withdraw the United States from the Paris Agreement.

On August 11, 2017, in an interview on PBS Newshour, Risch endorsed Trump's threatening North Korea with military destruction in the event that country launched missiles at Guam.

On March 22, 2018, the day before a potential federal government shutdown, Risch threatened to block a government spending bill because it included changing the name of the White Clouds Wilderness protected area to honor a deceased political rival, former Idaho Governor Cecil Andrus. Risch ultimately acquiesced.

In January 2019, Risch joined Marco Rubio, Cory Gardner, and Senate Majority Leader Mitch McConnell in introducing legislation that would impose sanctions on the government of President of Syria Bashar al-Assad and bolster American cooperation with Israel and Jordan.

==== 2020s ====
On January 21, 2020, during the first day of opening arguments in Trump's Senate impeachment trial, Risch was the first senator to fall asleep. Courtroom sketch artist Art Lien memorialized his nap.

In 2020, while Chairman of the Senate Foreign Relations Committee, Risch decided not to press Secretary of State Mike Pompeo to testify at the annual budget hearing. Pompeo had just successfully sought to have State Department inspector general Steve Linick fired; at the time, Linick had been conducting a watchdog investigation into the Trump administration's decision to sell arms to Saudi Arabia without congressional approval. For his tenure as chair of the Senate Foreign Relations Committee during the 116th Congress, the nonpartisan Lugar Center's Congressional Oversight Hearing Index gave Risch an "F" grade.

Risch was participating in the certification of the 2021 United States Electoral College vote count when Trump supporters stormed the United States Capitol. He called the attack "unpatriotic and un-American in the extreme" and suggested it was spurred by "deep distrust in the integrity and veracity of our elections."

In 2021, Risch blocked the confirmation of Holocaust historian Deborah Lipstadt to the position of special envoy to monitor and combat antisemitism.

==== Committee assignments ====
- Committee on Energy and Natural Resources
  - Subcommittee on Energy
  - Subcommittee on Public Lands and Forests
  - Subcommittee on Water and Power
- Committee on Foreign Relations (Chair)
- Committee on Small Business and Entrepreneurship
- Select Committee on Ethics
- Select Committee on Intelligence

==== Caucuses ====
- Congressional Coalition on Adoption
- Rare Disease Caucus
- Senate Republican Conference

== Foreign policy positions ==
=== Saudi Arabia ===
In 2019, Risch sought to quell dissent among Republican senators over what they perceived as the Trump administration's weak response to the killing of Saudi journalist and U.S. permanent resident Jamal Khashoggi, and its refusal to send Congress a report on the administration's determination of who killed Khashoggi. He told his fellow Republican senators and Politico that the Trump administration was in compliance with the Magnitsky Act, but the administration had said that it refused to comply with the Act.

=== Iran war ===
In February 2026, Risch praised Trump's initial strikes in the 2026 Iran war. He endorsed the nuclear rationale for the Iran war. Risch voted against the Iran war powers resolution that was written to direct Trump to limit military engagement with Iran until congressional consent had been obtained.

=== Israel Anti-Boycott Act ===
In March 2018, Risch co-sponsored the Israel Anti-Boycott Act (s. 720), which would bar federal contractors from encouraging or participating in boycotts against Israel and Israeli settlements in the West Bank.

=== Turkey sanctions ===
Risch was a co-sponsor of the Promoting American National Security and Preventing the Resurgence of ISIS Act of 2019 (S.2641–116th), which was intended to punish Turkey and protect allies like the Kurds, who had suffered from recent Turkish military operations in Syria, including by resettling them in the U.S. The measure had broad support in Congress, which was concerned about the purchase of the Russian S-400 missile system Turkey was testing.

=== Ethiopia ===
On October 18, 2022, Risch criticized the Biden administration for hesitating to impose sanctions on the government of Ethiopia, where many atrocities and war crimes were committed in the Tigray War. He tweeted that Biden "must stop avoiding the use of sanctions in fear of offending and prioritize #humanrights".

=== NATO ===
In July 2024, Risch sponsored a report that advocated strengthening NATO and enhancing its planning for potential interference from the People's Republic of China.

=== Sudan ===
In October 2025, Risch condemned the massacre of civilians in El Fasher, Sudan.

== Political positions ==
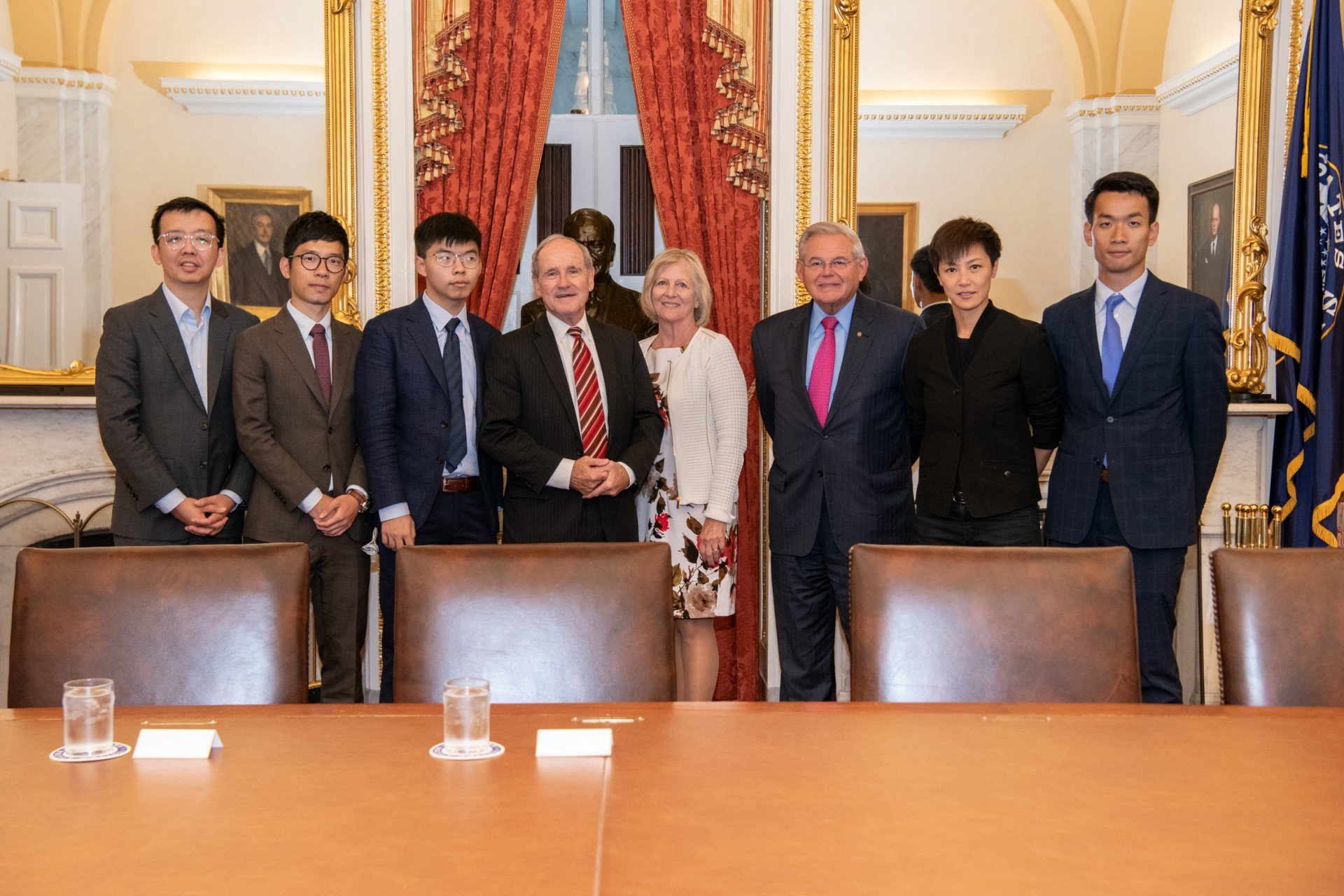
Risch with Hong Kong activists who have become prominent figures in the 2019–2020 Hong Kong protests

Risch is considered politically conservative. The American Conservative Union's Center for Legislative Accountability gives him a lifetime conservative score of 91.54. The liberal Americans for Democratic Action gave him an ideology score of zero in 2019.

=== Abortion ===
Risch is anti-abortion. He believes that Roe v. Wade was wrongly decided. In 2013, he co-sponsored the Child Interstate Abortion Notification Act, which would have made it illegal for a minor to cross state lines for an abortion. Risch supported the June 2022 overturning of Roe v. Wade and applauded the Supreme Court for recognizing "that states have an interest in protecting life at all stages of development by giving Americans the power to decide this matter at the state-level through their elected representatives."

=== Animal welfare ===
In 2025, Risch received a score of 0 out of 100 from the Humane World Action Fund, the political affiliate of Humane World for Animals.

=== Gun rights ===
The National Rifle Association Political Victory Fund (NRA-PVF) endorsed Risch and gave him an A+ grade for his voting record on gun issues.

In 2013, along with 12 other Republican senators, Risch threatened to filibuster any bills Democrats introduced that Republicans perceived as a threat to gun rights, including expanded background checks. In an interview with National Public Radio, he said that Americans' right to keep and bear arms includes "a right to purchase one [a gun], to sell one, to trade in one, and you really have to have a robust market if indeed you're going to have a constitutional right." He also said that additional background checks would mean that gun dealers would "have to deal with the federal bureaucracy, which is very, very difficult to deal with."

In response to the Orlando nightclub shooting, Risch and Crapo said the shooting was not a reason to call for gun control legislation.

In 2016, Risch voted against the Feinstein Amendment, which would have blocked the sale of guns to people on the terrorist watch list, and Democrat Chris Murphy's proposal to expand background checks for sales at gun shows and online. Risch voted for both Republican-backed bills, John Cornyn's proposal to create a 72-hour delay for anyone on the terrorist watchlist buying a gun and Charles Grassley and Ted Cruz's proposal to alert authorities if a someone on the list tries to buy a firearm.

=== Criminal justice ===
Risch opposed the FIRST STEP Act, a bipartisan criminal justice reform bill. The bill passed by a vote of 87–12 on December 18, 2018.

=== Health care ===
Risch supports repealing and replacing the Affordable Care Act (ACA), also known as Obamacare. He voted against the ACA in 2010.

=== 2021 storming of the United States Capitol ===
On May 28, 2021, Risch abstained from voting on the creation of an independent commission to investigate the 2021 United States Capitol attack.

=== Veteran Affairs ===
On August 2, 2022, Risch was one of only 11 senators to vote against the Promise to Address Comprehensive Toxics (PACT) Act, a bill to expand VA health care and benefits for veterans exposed to burn pits and other toxic substances.

=== Fiscal Responsibility Act of 2023 ===
Risch was among the 31 Senate Republicans who voted against final passage of the Fiscal Responsibility Act of 2023.

== Personal life ==
Risch is Roman Catholic.

== Electoral history ==
=== Idaho State Senate ===
Idaho State Senate District 18 election, 1996
Primary election
Party	Candidate	Votes	%
Republican	Jim Risch (incumbent)	2,299	76.43
Republican	Emil Loya, Jr.	709	23.57
Total votes		3,008	100.00
General election
Republican	Jim Risch (incumbent)	9,543	67.53
Democratic	Sharon Ullman	4,589	32.47
Total votes		14,132	100.00
Republican hold			

Idaho State Senate District 18 election, 1998
Primary election
Party	Candidate	Votes	%
Republican	Jim Risch (incumbent)	2,656	67.43
Republican	Sharon Ullman	1,283	32.57
Total votes		3,939	100.00
General election
Republican	Jim Risch (incumbent)	8,742	76.02
Libertarian	Daniel Adams	2,758	23.98
Total votes		11,500	100.00
Republican hold			

Idaho State Senate District 18 election, 2000
Primary election
Party	Candidate	Votes	%
Republican	Jim Risch (incumbent)	3,222	50.40
Republican	Jack Noble	3,171	49.60
Total votes		6,393	100.00
General election
Republican	Jim Risch (incumbent)	12,917	80.32
Libertarian	Daniel Adams	3,165	19.68
Total votes		16,082	100.00
Republican hold			

=== Idaho Lieutenant Governor ===
Idaho Lieutenant Governor election, 2002
Primary election
Party	Candidate	Votes	%
Republican	Jim Risch	49,607	34.62
Republican	Jack Riggs	39,689	27.69
Republican	Celia Gould	22,134	15.44
Republican	Larry Eastland	22,079	15.41
Republican	Jim Pratt	5,638	3.93
Republican	Darrell Babbitt	4,161	2.90
Total votes		143,308	100.00
General election
Republican	Jim Risch	226,017	56.22
Democratic	Bruce M. Perry	160,438	39.91
Libertarian	Michael J. Kempf	15,562	3.87
Total votes		402,017	100.00
Republican hold			

Idaho Lieutenant Governor election, 2006
Primary election
Party	Candidate	Votes	%
Republican	Jim Risch (incumbent)	119,401	100.00
Total votes		119,401	100.00
General election
Republican	Jim Risch (incumbent)	259,648	58.29
Democratic	Larry LaRocco	175,312	39.36
Constitution	William Charles Wellisch	10,460	2.35
Total votes		445,420	100.00
Republican hold			

=== U.S. Senator ===
U.S. Senate election in Idaho, 2008
Primary election
Party	Candidate	Votes	%
Republican	Jim Risch	80,743	65.34
Republican	Scott Syme	16,660	13.48
Republican	Richard Phenneger	6,532	5.29
Republican	Neal Thompson	5,375	4.35
Republican	Fred Adams	4,987	4.04
Republican	Bill Hunter	4,280	3.46
Republican	Brian Hefner	2,915	2.36
Republican	Hal James Styles, Jr.	2,082	1.68
Total votes		123,574	100.00
General election
Republican	Jim Risch	371,744	57.65
Democratic	Larry LaRocco	219,903	34.11
Independent	Rex Rammell	34,510	5.35
Libertarian	Kent Marmon	9,958	1.54
Independent	Pro-Life	8,662	1.34
Total votes		644,777	100.00
Republican hold			

U.S. Senate election in Idaho, 2014
Primary election
Party	Candidate	Votes	%
Republican	Jim Risch (incumbent)	119,209	79.93
Republican	Jeremy "T" Anderson	29,939	20.07
Total votes		149,148	100.00
General election
Republican	Jim Risch (incumbent)	285,596	65.33
Democratic	Nels Mitchell	151,574	34.67
Total votes		437,170	100.00
Republican hold			

U.S. Senate election in Idaho, 2020
Primary election
Party	Candidate	Votes	%
Republican	Jim Risch (incumbent)	200,184	100.00
Total votes		200,184	100.00
General election
Republican	Jim Risch (incumbent)	538,446	62.62
Democratic	Paulette Jordan	285,864	33.25
Independent	Natalie M. Fleming	25,329	2.95
Constitution	Ray J. Writz	10,188	1.18
Total votes		859,827	100.00
Republican hold			

Political offices
Preceded by Jack Riggs	Lieutenant Governor of Idaho; 2003–2006	Succeeded by Mark Ricks
Preceded by Dirk Kempthorne	Governor of Idaho; 2006–2007	Succeeded by Butch Otter
Preceded by Mark Ricks	Lieutenant Governor of Idaho; 2007–2009	Succeeded by Brad Little
Party political offices
Preceded by Larry Craig	Republican nominee for U.S. Senator from Idaho (Class 2); 2008, 2014, 2020, 2026	Most recent
U.S. Senate
Preceded by Larry Craig	U.S. Senator (Class 2) from Idaho; 2009–present Served alongside: Mike Crapo	Incumbent
Preceded by Olympia Snowe	Ranking Member of the Senate Small Business Committee; 2013–2015	Succeeded by Jeanne Shaheen
Preceded by David Vitter	Chair of the Senate Small Business Committee; 2017–2019	Succeeded by Marco Rubio
Preceded by Bob Corker	Chair of the Senate Foreign Relations Committee; 2019–2021	Succeeded by Bob Menendez
Preceded by Bob Menendez	Ranking Member of the Senate Foreign Relations Committee; 2021–2025	Succeeded by Jeanne Shaheen
Preceded by Ben Cardin	Chair of the Senate Foreign Relations Committee; 2025–present	Incumbent
U.S. order of precedence (ceremonial)
Preceded by Jeff Merkley	Order of precedence of the United States as United States Senator	Succeeded by Michael Bennet
Preceded by Mark Warner	United States senators by seniority 21st	Succeeded by Jeff Merkley
