= Tom Trail =

American politician (1935–2023)

Thomas Trail

Member of the Idaho House of Representatives
- In office December 1, 1996 – November 30, 2012
- Preceded by: Doc Lucas
- Succeeded by: Thyra Stevenson (redistricting)
- Constituency: 5th district Seat A (1996–2002); 6th district Seat A (2002–2012)

Personal details
- Born: July 29, 1935 Moscow, Idaho
- Died: November 2, 2023 (aged 88) Moscow, Idaho
- Party: Republican
- Education: University of Idaho; University of Maryland; Montana State University
- Profession: Educator

Military service
- Branch/service: United States Army Reserve
- Years of service: 1953–1961

Thomas 'Tom' Floyd Trail (July 29, 1935 – November 2, 2023) was a Republican Idaho State Representative from 1996 to 2012.

== Education ==
Trail graduated from Moscow High School and earned his bachelor's degree in animal science from the University of Idaho. He earned his master's degree from the University of Maryland and earned his doctorate in experimental psychology from Montana State University.

== Elections ==
=== Idaho House of Representative District 6 Seat A ===
==== 2010 ====
Trail was unopposed in the Republican primary. Trail defeated Democratic nominee Judith Brown again this time with 57.4% of the vote in the general election.

==== 2008 ====
Trail was unopposed in the Republican primary. Trail defeated Democratic nominee Judith Brown with 53.4% of the vote in the general election.

==== 2006 ====
Trail was unopposed for the Republican primary and the general election.

==== 2004 ====
Trail was unopposed for the Republican primary. Trail defeated Democratic nominee Mark Solomon with 60.8% of the vote in the general election.

==== 2002 ====
Redistricted to District 6, and with Representative Frank Bruneel re-districted to District 7, Trail was unopposed for the Republican primary and the general election.

=== Idaho House of Representative District 5 Seat A ===
==== 2000 ====
Trail was unopposed for the Republican primary. Trail defeated Democratic nominee Don Combs with 60% of the vote in the general election.

==== 1998 ====
Trail was unopposed for the Republican primary and the general election.

==== 1996 ====
When Republican Representative Doc Lucas left the District 5 A seat open, Trail won the Republican primary with 75% of the vote against Buck Kimsey. Trail defeated Democratic nominee Vera White with 52.8% of the vote in the general election.
