= 2014 United States Senate election in Idaho =

- November 4, 2014
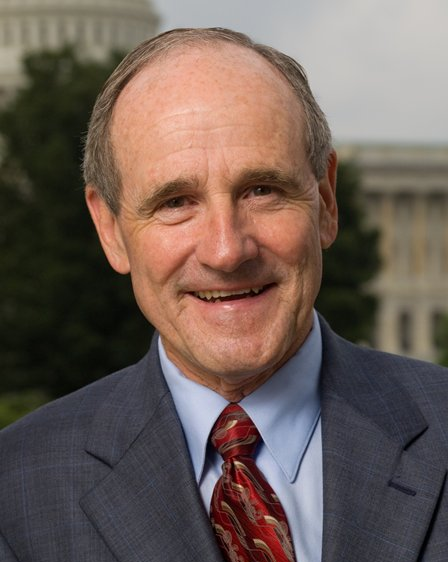

Nominee	Jim Risch	Nels Mitchell
Party	Republican	Democratic
Popular vote	285,596	151,574
Percentage	65.33%	34.67%
- Risch: 50–60% 60–70% 70–80% 80–90% Mitchell: 50–60%
U.S. senator before election
Jim Risch
Republican
Elected U.S. Senator
Jim Risch
Republican

Republican primary results by county Risch: 70–80%; 80–90%

Democratic primary results by county Mitchell: 50–60%; 60–70%; 70–80%; 80–90%; 90–100%

The 2014 United States Senate election in Idaho was held on November 4, 2014, to elect a member of the United States Senate to represent the State of Idaho, concurrently with the election of the Governor of Idaho, other elections to the United States Senate, elections to the United States House of Representatives, and various state and local elections.

Incumbent Republican Senator Jim Risch ran for re-election to a second term in office. In primary elections held on May 20, 2014, Risch was renominated and the Democrats nominated attorney Nels Mitchell. Risch defeated Mitchell by a landslide in the general election.

== Republican primary ==
=== Candidates ===
==== Declared ====
- Jeremy Anderson
- Jim Risch, incumbent U.S. Senator

=== Results ===
Republican primary results
Party	Candidate	Votes	%
Republican	Jim Risch (incumbent)	118,927	79.91%
Republican	Jeremy Anderson	29,897	20.09%
Total votes		148,824	100.00%

== Democratic primary ==
=== Candidates ===
==== Declared ====
- William Bryk, attorney from New York and perennial candidate
- Nels Mitchell, attorney

=== Results ===
Democratic primary results
Party	Candidate	Votes	%
Democratic	Nels Mitchell	16,905	69.6%
Democratic	William Bryk	7,383	30.4%
Total votes		24,288	100.0%

== General election ==
=== Fundraising ===
Candidate	Receipts	Disbursements	Cash on Hand	Debt
Jim Risch (R)	$1,339,302	$630,796	$940,697	$0
Nels Mitchell (D)	$149,218	$59,311	$89,907	$5,000

=== Debates ===
- Complete video of debate, October 6, 2014

=== Predictions ===
Source	Ranking	As of
The Cook Political Report	Solid R	November 3, 2014
Sabato's Crystal Ball	Safe R	November 3, 2014
Rothenberg Political Report	Safe R	November 3, 2014
Real Clear Politics	Safe R	November 3, 2014

=== Polling ===
Poll source	Date(s) administered	Sample size	Margin of error	Jim Risch (R)	Nels Mitchell (D)	Other	Undecided
Rasmussen Reports	May 28–29, 2014	750	± 4%	54%	29%	6%	11%
CBS News/NYT/YouGov	July 5–24, 2014	696	± 4.2%	62%	31%	1%	6%
CBS News/NYT/YouGov	August 18 – September 2, 2014	844	± 4%	59%	25%	0%	16%
CBS News/NYT/YouGov	September 20 – October 1, 2014	594	± 5%	64%	27%	0%	8%
Public Policy Polling	October 9–12, 2014	522	± 4.3%	50%	32%	—	18%
CBS News/NYT/YouGov	October 16–23, 2014	575	± 6%	61%	30%	—	9%

=== Results ===
United States Senate election in Idaho, 2014
Party	Candidate	Votes	%	±%
Republican	Jim Risch (incumbent)	285,596	65.33%	+7.68%
Democratic	Nels Mitchell	151,574	34.67%	+0.56%
Majority		134,022	30.66%	+7.11%
Total votes		437,170	100.00%	N/A
Republican hold				

==== Counties that flipped from Democratic to Republican ====
- Latah (largest municipality: Moscow)
- Shoshone (largest municipality: Kellogg)
- Teton (largest municipality: Victor)

==== By congressional district ====
Risch won both congressional districts.

District	Risch	Mitchell	Representative
1st	69%	31%	Raúl Labrador
2nd	62%	38%	Mike Simpson

== See also ==
- 2014 United States Senate elections
- 2014 United States elections
- 2014 United States House of Representatives elections in Idaho
- 2014 Idaho gubernatorial election
