= MacRobert baronets =

Extinct title in the United Kingdom

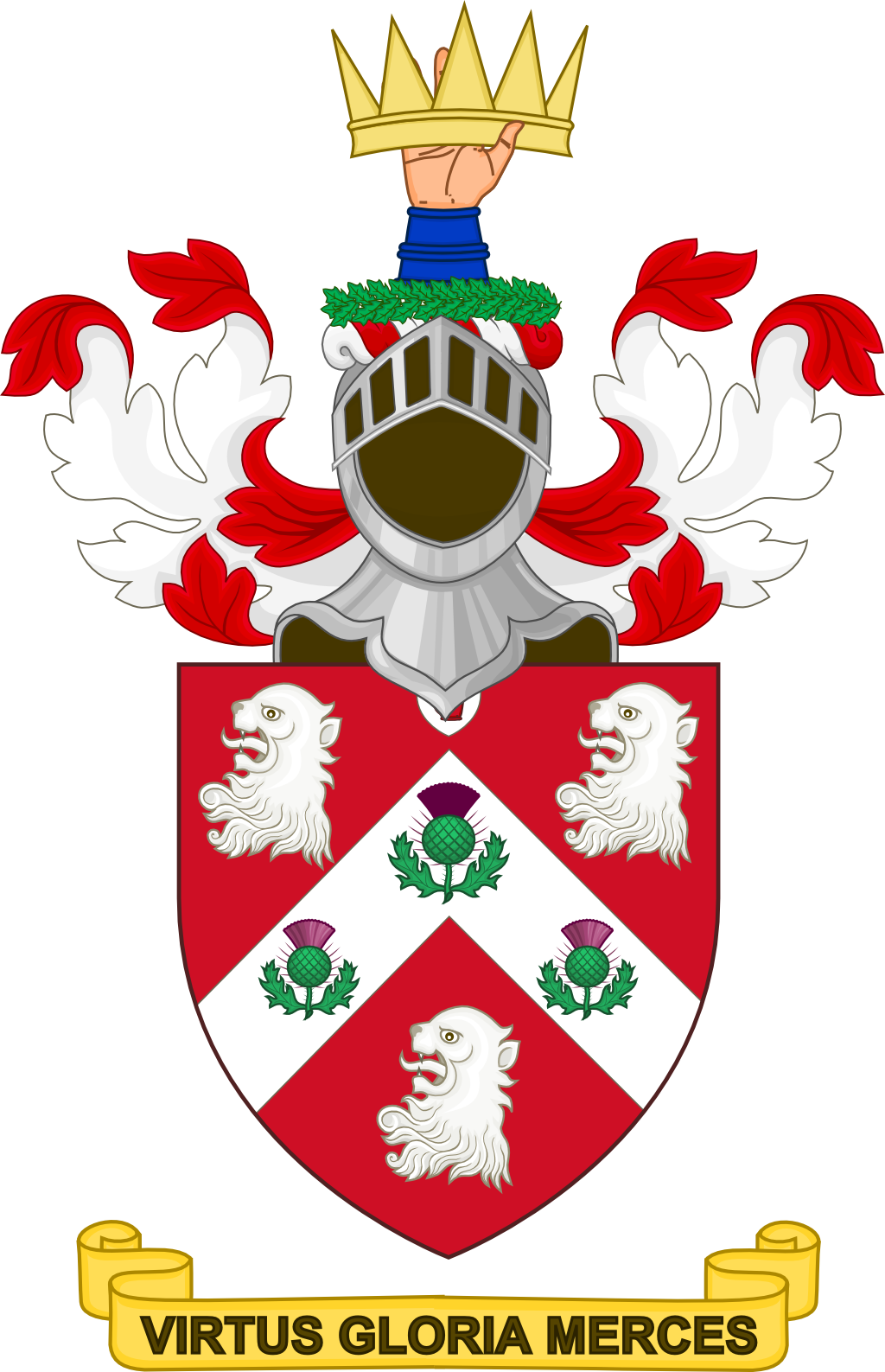
Coat of arms of MacRobert.

The MacRobert Baronetcy, of Douneside in the County of Aberdeen, was a title in the Baronetage of the United Kingdom.

It was created on 5 April 1922 for Alexander MacRobert, a self-made millionaire. He was succeeded by his eldest son Alasdair (born 1912) in June of that year. Tragedy struck the family again when Alasdair was killed in a flying accident in 1938, and the title passed to his younger brother Roderic(born 1915). In May 1941 Roderic was killed in action whilst flying a Hawker Hurricane fighter in the Middle East, and just over a month later on 30 June 1941, the title became extinct when the youngest brother Iain (born 1917), was also killed in action whilst serving with the Royal Air Force.

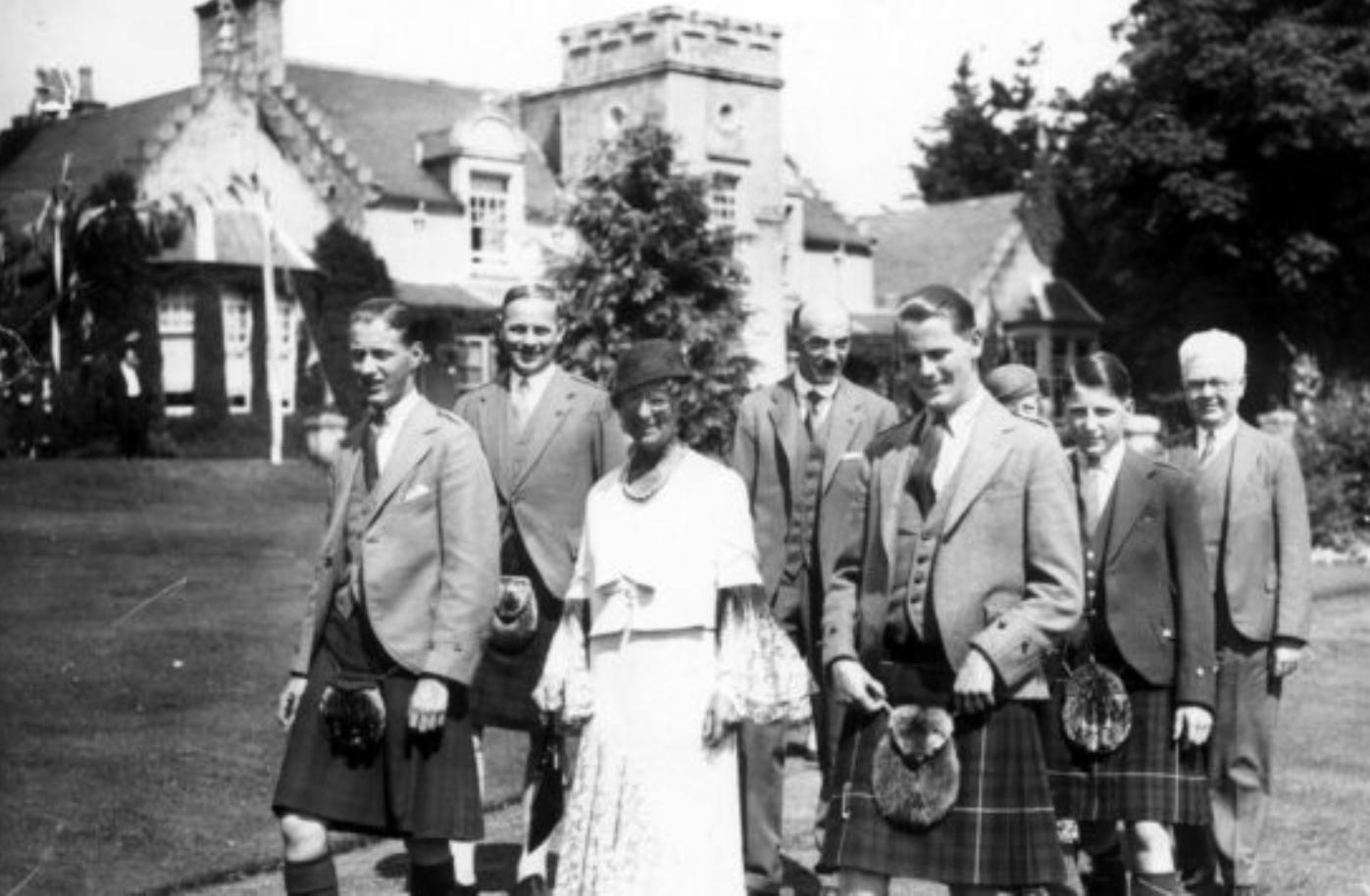
Around 1930. From left: Roderick (born 1915), Lady MacRobert, Alasdair (born 1912) and Iain (youngest, born 1917).

Their mother, Rachel, Lady MacRobert (1884–1954), gave £25,000 to purchase a Short Stirling bomber, the aircraft was named MacRobert's Reply in memory of her three sons. Lady MacRobert believed that her sons had lived up to the family motto Virtutis Gloria Merces – translated as Honour is the Reward of Bravery. The MacRobert Award, which has been presented every year since 1969 by the Royal Academy of Engineering, is named in honour of Lady MacRobert.

== The Flight Of The Eaglets ==
Pipe Major W. Ross composed the slow march (or lament) in memory of Lady MacRobert's three sons in 1944. It is in the Scots Guards Standard Settings Of Pipe Music 1954, page 70. Also played by Angus Grant, the Lochaber Fiddler.

== Aircraft ==
=== MacRobert's Reply ===
After the deaths of the three MacRobert brothers in RAF service, their mother, Lady MacRobert, wanted to honour and commemorate them. She donated £25,000 to buy a Short Stirling bomber, which was named MacRobert's Reply.

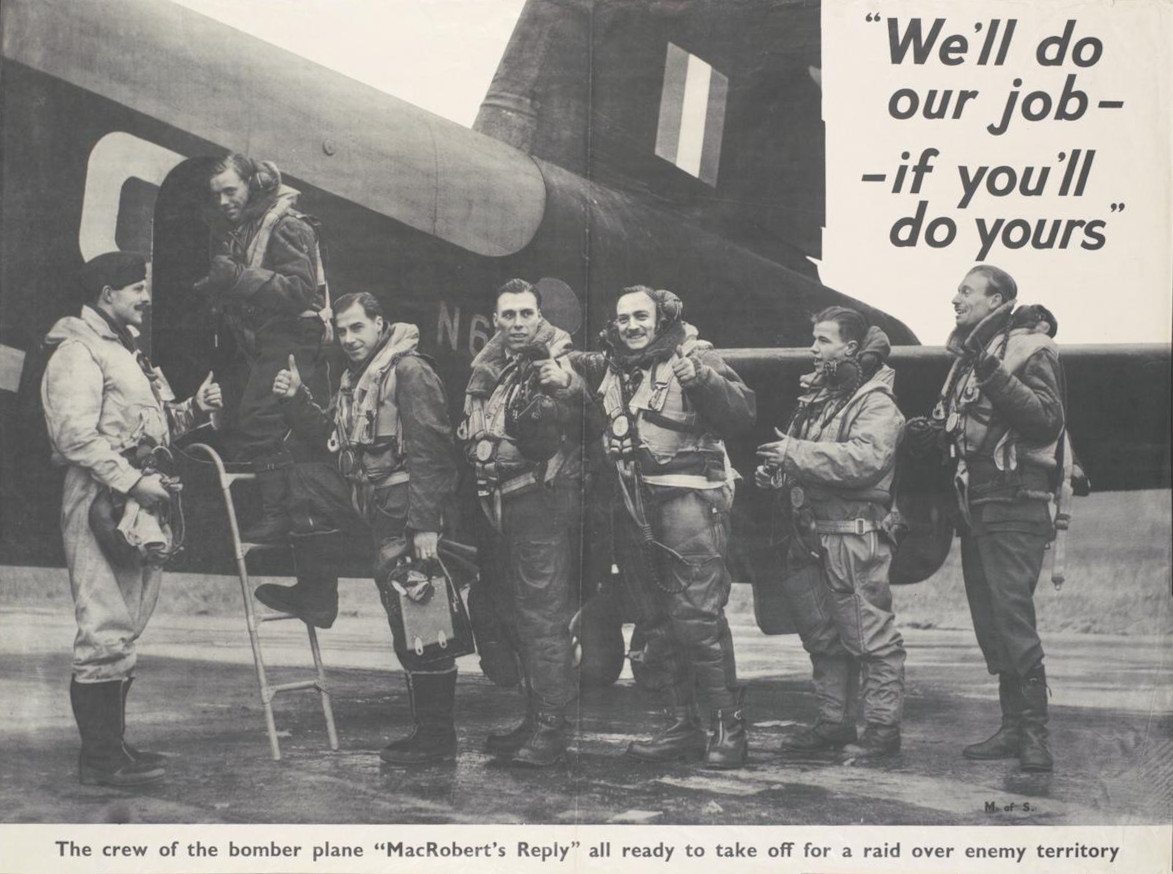

The plane had serial number N6086 and had the MacRobert coat of arms painted on its nose. The plane was handed over to her crew at RAF Wyton on October 10, 1941, with Lady MacRobert attending the naming ceremony. She was assigned to No. XV Squadron and was given the code "LS-F" ("LS", the squadron code for No. 15 Squadron, and "F for Freddie"). The aircraft flew twelve missions, from October 1941 through January 1942. On 7 February 1942, the plane veered off during take-off at RAF Peterhead, and collided with a damaged Supermarine Spitfire.

After this accident, a second Short Stirling, serial number W7531, was named MacRobert's Reply (it was not officially named MacRobert's Reply until after entering service in March 1942). The aircraft was lost during a minelaying raid against the Øresund in May 1942; it was brought down by anti-aircraft fire and crashed into Gals Klint Forest, near the town of Middelfart. Only one member of the crew, Sergeant Donald Jeffs, survived the crash. With the loss of the second Stirling the MacRobert's Reply tradition ended.

In April 1982, the tradition was revived by No. XV Squadron with the naming of Hawker Siddeley Buccaneer S.2B XT287 (coded "F") as MacRobert's Reply. The MacRobert family crest was also added onto the fuselage below the cockpit canopy. Squadron Leader Peter Boggis (who was the first pilot to fly the original 'MacRobert's Reply') unveiled the aircraft at No. XV Squadron's former base RAF Mildenhall.

No. XV Squadron maintained the tradition when it converted to the Panavia Tornado in 1983 with Tornado GR.1B ZA446 ("F") bearing the MacRobert's Reply name and MacRobert family crest. Over the next 34 years another three Tornados bore the name and crest (ZA559, ZA602 and ZD741) until the squadron disbanded on 31 March 2017. The last MacRobert's Reply Tornado GR.4 ZD741 made its final flight on 25 January 2018 to RAF Leeming and was scrapped in October 2018, bringing an end to the tradition.

=== The MacRobert Fighters ===
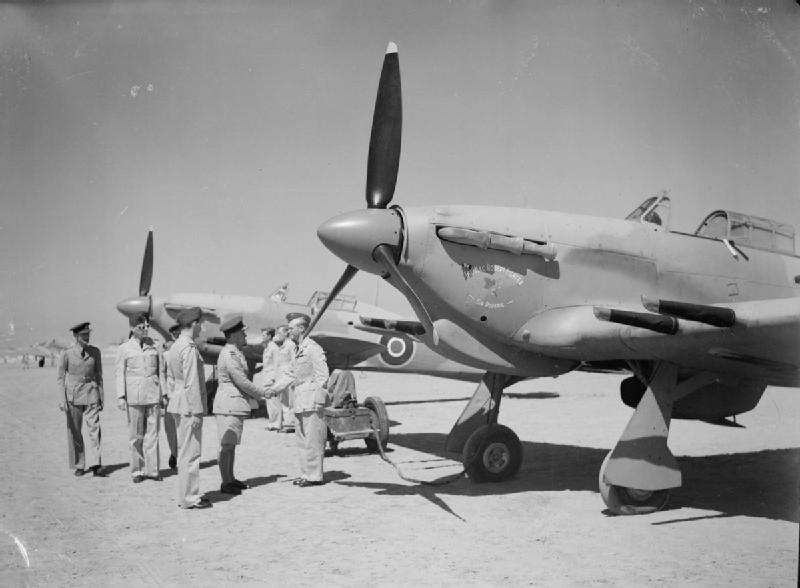
HL735 "The MacRobert Fighter – Sir Roderic" being handed over to No. 94 Squadron at El Gamil, Egypt

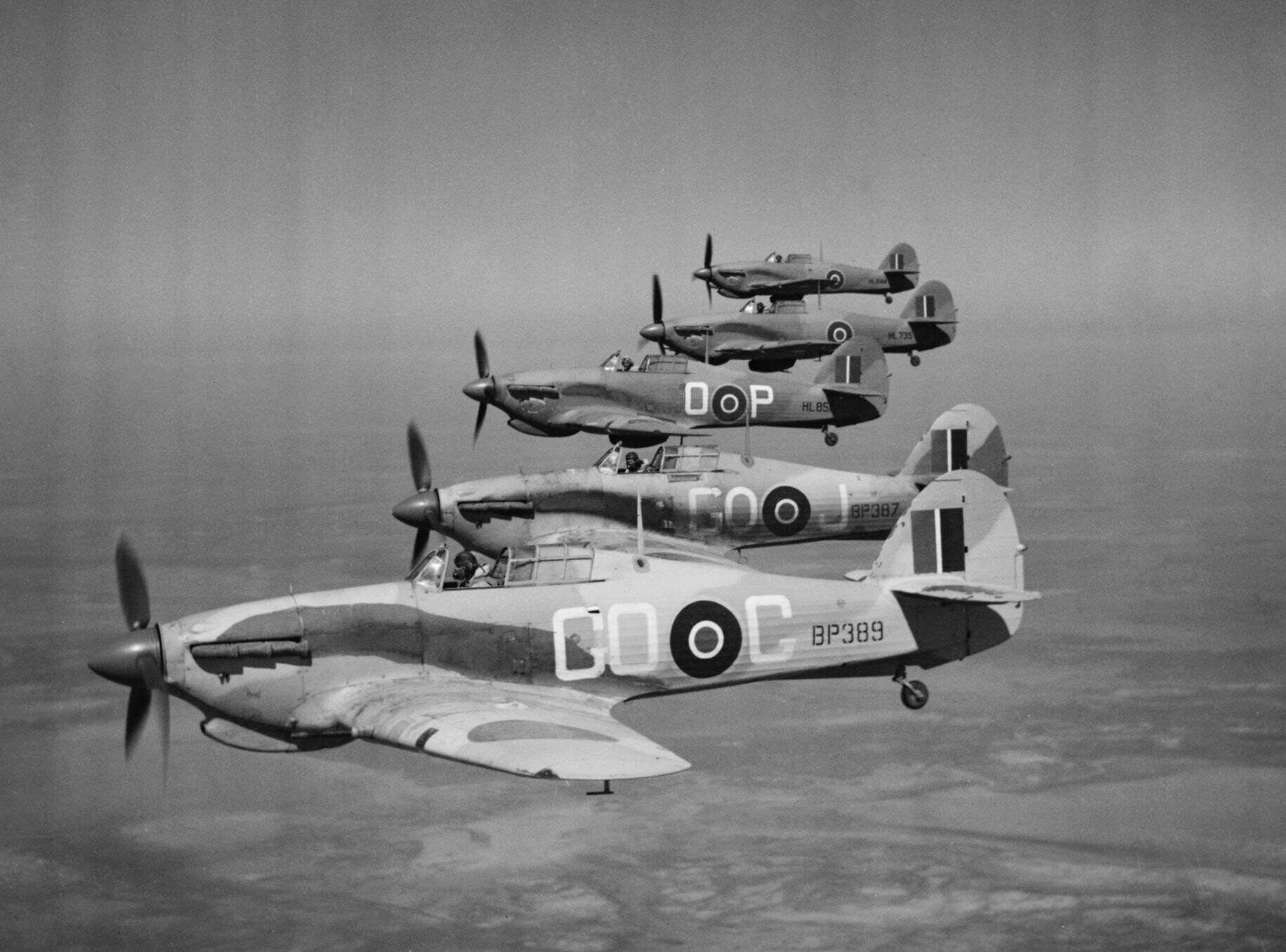
Sir Iain, Sir Roderic and Sir Alasdair third fourth and fifth from camera respectively

Lady MacRobert also sponsored four Hawker Hurricanes, three named after her sons and the fourth honouring the fighting spirit of the Russian allies. They were handed over to No. 94 Squadron, in which Sir Roderic had served, in Egypt on 19 September 1942.

In the 1960s three Slingsby Swallow gliders for the Air Training Corps were named after the MacRobert brothers: Sir Alasdair, Sir Iain and Sir Roderic.

On 8 November 2017, Eurofighter Typhoon FGR4 ZJ919 of No. 6 Squadron at RAF Lossiemouth had the markings of The MacRobert Fighter - Sir Roderic added on the side fuselage below the cockpit canopy, thus maintaining the connection between the MacRobert family and RAF Lossiemouth following the disbandment of No. XV (Reserve) Squadron which had operated the flagship of the squadron's Tornado GR4 fleet MacRobert's Reply.

=== List of aircraft ===
==== MacRobert's Reply ====
Short Stirling Mk.I N6086, (LS-F) operated by No. XV Squadron.
Short Stirling Mk.I W7531, (LS-F) operated by No. XV Squadron.
Hawker Siddeley Buccaneer S.2B XT287 (F), operated by No. XV Squadron.
Panavia Tornado GR.1B ZA446 (F), operated by No. XV Squadron.
Panavia Tornado GR.1 ZA559 (F), operated by No. XV Squadron.
Panavia Tornado GR.4(T) ZA602 (F), operated by No. XV (R) Squadron.
Panavia Tornado GR.4 ZD741 (LS-F), operated by No. XV (R) Squadron.

==== Sir Iain ====
Hawker Hurricane Mk.IIc HL851 operated by No. 94 Squadron.
Slingsby Swallow glider for the Air Training Corps.
Grob Vigilant T.1 ZZ192, operated by No. 2 Flying Training School.

==== Sir Roderic ====
Hawker Hurricane Mk.IIc HL735 operated by No. 94 Squadron.
Slingsby Swallow glider for the Air Training Corps.
Grob Vigilant T.1 ZJ967, operated by No. 2 Flying Training School.
Eurofighter Typhoon FGR4 ZJ919, operated by No. 6 Squadron, with The MacRobert Fighter - Sir Roderic marking on front, starboard fuselage below cockpit canopy.
Eurofighter Typhoon FGR4 ZK427, operated by No. 6 Squadron, with The MacRobert Fighter - Sir Roderic marking on front, starboard fuselage below cockpit canopy.
Eurofighter Typhoon FGR4 ZK312, operated by No. 6 Squadron, with The MacRobert Fighter - Sir Roderic marking on front, starboard fuselage below cockpit canopy.

==== Sir Alasdair ====
Hawker Hurricane Mk.IIc HL844 operated by No. 94 Squadron.
Slingsby Swallow glider for the Air Training Corps.

==== Other aircraft ====
- One Hurricane commemorating Russian allies operated by No. 94 Squadron.
- The flying training organisation Tayside Aviation has four Air Cadet training aircraft: three of them carry the MacRobert family crest and the names of the three sons; the fourth is named in remembrance of Donald Jeffs, the survivor of the MacRoberts Reply Stirling Bomber shot down in 1942.

== MacRobert baronets, of Douneside (1922) ==
- Sir Alexander MacRobert, 1st Baronet (1854–1922)
- Sir Alasdair Workman MacRobert, 2nd Baronet (1912–1938)
- Sir Roderic Alan MacRobert, 3rd Baronet (1915–1941)
- Sir Iain Workman MacRobert, 4th Baronet (1917–1941)
