= Fred Tilman =

American politician from Idaho

Member of the Idaho House of Representatives from the 18B district
- In office December 2002 – December 2004
- Succeeded by: Julie Ellsworth

Member of the Idaho House of Representatives from the 21B district
- In office December 2002 – December 2004
- Preceded by: Tim Ridinger
- Succeeded by: Cliff Bayer

Personal details
- Born: June 21, 1945 (age 81) Caldwell, Idaho
- Party: Republican
- Spouse: Geri Tilman
- Children: 1
- Occupation: Politician
- Military career
- Allegiance: United States
- Branch: United States Army
- Service years: 1965-1968

Fred Tilman (born June 21, 1945) is an American politician who served as a member of Idaho House of Representatives from 2002 to 2004. He later served as a member of the Ada County Board of Commissioners.

== Early life and education ==
Tilman was born in Caldwell, Idaho and attended Boise State University. Tilman served in the United States Army from 1965 to 1968.

== Career ==
=== Idaho Republican Party ===
Tilman defeated incumbent Greg Ferch in 2014 to become the Ada County Republican Party Chair.

=== Ada County commissioner ===
Tilman resigned 5/16/2003 from the Idaho House of Representatives to be appointed to the Ada County Board of Commissioners. He served till 2010 where he lost in the Republican primary.

== Elections ==
=== Idaho House of Representatives 22 Seat B ===
==== 2012 ====
Tilman took second losing to Jason Monks in the Republican primary taking only 20.6% of the vote; Michael Law, and Stephen Warren also ran.

=== Ada County Commissioner ===
==== 2010 ====
Tilman lost to Vern Bisterfeldt, a Boise City Council member in the Republican primary election losing by 738 votes.

=== Idaho House of Representatives 21 Seat B ===
==== 2002 ====
Tilman defeated Cliff Bayer in the Republican primary with 60% of the vote. Tilman defeated Democratic nominee James D. (Jay) Gooden and Libertarian nominee Teddi Hyde with 65.4% of the vote in the general election.

=== Idaho House of Representatives 18 Seat B ===
==== 2000 ====
Tilman was unopposed in the Republican primary. Tilman defeated Democratic nominee James D. Gooden Jr. with 71.5% of the vote in the general election.

==== 1998 ====
Tilman was unopposed in the Republican primary and the general election.

==== 1996 ====
Tilman was unopposed in the Republican primary. Tilman was unopposed in the general election due to the Democratic nominee Robert M. Chase dropped out.

==== 1994 ====
Tilman was unopposed in the Republican primary and general election.

==== 1992 ====
Tilman was unopposed in the Republican primary. Tilman defeated Democratic nominee H.Y. "Skip" Nakashima.

==== 1990 ====
Tilman defeated John L. Osier in the Republican primary. Tilman defeated Democratic nominee Linda Cope.

== Personal life ==
Tilman's wife is Geri Tilman. They have one child. Tilman and his family live in Boise, Idaho.
