= MacRobert =

MacRobert or McRobert is a surname. Notable people with the name include:

- MacRobert baronets, a title in the Baronetage of the United Kingdom
  - Sir Alexander MacRobert, 1st Baronet, Scottish self-made millionaire
  - Rachel Workman MacRobert, Lady MacRobert (1884–1954), Scottish geologist and philanthropist
- Alan MacRobert (born 1951), astronomy writer, after whom asteroid 10373 MacRobert is named
- Alexander MacRobert (politician) (1873–1930), Scottish lawyer and Unionist politician
- Alexander McRobert (Virginia politician), a mayor of Richmond, Virginia in 1789
- Angus MacRobert (born 1968), South African cricketer
- Karin McRobert (born 1953), Australian basketball player
- Leslie McRobert, a World War I flying ace
- Stuart McRobert (born 1958), writer on strength training
- Thomas Murray MacRobert (1884-1962), Scottish mathematician

== See also ==
- McRoberts (disambiguation)
