= Trent Clark =

Trent Clark may refer to:

- Trent Grisham, né Clark, American baseball player
- Trent Clark (politician), chair of the Idaho Republican Party
