= Idaho's 21st legislative district =

American legislative district

Idaho's 21st legislative district is one of 35 districts of the Idaho Legislature. It is currently represented by Treg Bernt (Republican), James Petzke (Republican), and Jeff Ehlers (Republican).

== District profile ==
=== 1984–1992 ===
From 1984 to 1992, District 21 was a floterial district that contained Districts 14, 15, 16, 17, 18, 19, and 20. District 21 consisted of all of Ada County.

Legislature	Session	Senate	House Seat A	House Seat B
47th (1984 - 1986)	1st	Jim Risch (R)	Boyd Hill (R)	Dean Sorensen (R)
47th (1984 - 1986)	2nd	Jim Risch (R)	Boyd Hill (R)	Dean Sorensen (R)
48th (1986 - 1988)	1st	Jim Risch (R)	Boyd Hill (R)	Sheila Sorensen (R)
48th (1986 - 1988)	2nd	Jim Risch (R)	Boyd Hill (R)	Sheila Sorensen (R)
49th (1988 - 1990)	1st	Mike Burkett (D)	Boyd Hill (R)	Sheila Sorensen (R)
49th (1988 - 1990)	2nd	Mike Burkett (D)	Boyd Hill (R)	Sheila Sorensen (R)
50th (1990 - 1992)	1st	Mike Burkett (D)	Al Lance (R)	Sheila Sorensen (R)
50th (1990 - 1992)	2nd	Mike Burkett (D)	Al Lance (R)	Sheila Sorensen (R)

=== 1992–2002 ===
From 1992 to 2002, District 21 consisted of Blaine, Camas, Lincoln Counties a portion of Elmore and Gooding Counties.

Legislature	Session	Senate	House Seat A	House Seat B
51st (1992 - 1994)	1st	John Peavey (D)	Clint Stennett (D)	Pattie Nafziger (D)
51st (1992 - 1994)	2nd	John Peavey (D)	Clint Stennett (D)	Pattie Nafziger (D)
52nd (1994 - 1996)	1st	Clint Stennett (D)	Wendy Jaquet (D)	Tim Ridinger (R)
52nd (1994 - 1996)	2nd	Clint Stennett (D)	Wendy Jaquet (D)	Tim Ridinger (R)
53rd (1996 - 1998)	1st	Clint Stennett (D)	Wendy Jaquet (D)	Tim Ridinger (R)
53rd (1996 - 1998)	2nd	Clint Stennett (D)	Wendy Jaquet (D)	Tim Ridinger (R)
54th (1998 - 2000)	1st	Clint Stennett (D)	Wendy Jaquet (D)	Tim Ridinger (R)
54th (1998 - 2000)	2nd	Clint Stennett (D)	Wendy Jaquet (D)	Tim Ridinger (R)
55th (2000 - 2002)	1st	Clint Stennett (D)	Wendy Jaquet (D)	Tim Ridinger (R)
55th (2000 - 2002)	2nd	Clint Stennett (D)	Wendy Jaquet (D)	Tim Ridinger (R)

=== 2002–2012 ===
From 2002 to 2012, District 21 consisted of a portion of Ada County.

Legislature	Session	Senate	House Seat A	House Seat B
57th (2002 - 2004)	1st	Jack Noble (R)	Bill Sali (R)	Fred Tilman (R)
57th (2002 - 2004)	2nd	Jack Noble (R)	Bill Sali (R)	Clifford Bayer (R)
58th (2004 - 2006)	1st	Jack Noble (R)	Bill Sali (R)	Clifford Bayer (R)
58th (2004 - 2006)	2nd	Russ Fulcher (R)	Bill Sali (R)	Clifford Bayer (R)
59th (2006 - 2008)	1st	Russ Fulcher (R)	John Vander Woude (R)	Clifford Bayer (R)
59th (2006 - 2008)	2nd	Russ Fulcher (R)	John Vander Woude (R)	Clifford Bayer (R)
60th (2008 - 2010)	1st	Russ Fulcher (R)	Rich Jarvis (R)	Clifford Bayer (R)
60th (2008 - 2010)	2nd	Russ Fulcher (R)	Rich Jarvis (R)	Clifford Bayer (R)
61st (2010 - 2012)	1st	Russ Fulcher (R)	John Vander Woude (R)	Clifford Bayer (R)
61st (2010 - 2012)	2nd	Russ Fulcher (R)	John Vander Woude (R)	Clifford Bayer (R)

=== 2012–2022 ===
District 21 currently consists of a portion of Ada County.

Legislature	Session	Senate	House Seat A	House Seat B
62nd (2012 - 2014)	1st	Clifford Bayer (R)	Steven Harris (R)	Thomas Dayley (R)
62nd (2012 - 2014)	2nd	Clifford Bayer (R)	Steven Harris (R)	Thomas Dayley (R)
63rd (2014 - 2016)	1st	Clifford Bayer (R)	Steven Harris (R)	Thomas Dayley (R)
63rd (2014 - 2016)	2nd	Clifford Bayer (R)	Steven Harris (R)	Thomas Dayley (R)
64th (2016 - 2018)	1st	Clifford Bayer (R)	Steven Harris (R)	Thomas Dayley (R)
64th (2016 - 2018)	2nd	Clifford Bayer (R)	Steven Harris (R)	Thomas Dayley (R)
65th (2018 - 2020)	1st	Regina Bayer (R)	Steven Harris (R)	Thomas Dayley (R)
65th (2018 - 2020)	2nd	Regina Bayer (R)	Steven Harris (R)	Megan Kiska (R)
66th (2020 - 2022)	1st	Regina Bayer (R)	Steven Harris (R)	Greg Ferch (R)
66th (2020 - 2022)	2nd	Regina Bayer (R)	Steven Harris (R)	Greg Ferch (R)

== See also ==
- List of Idaho senators
- List of Idaho representatives
