= Richard Jarvis =

Richard Jarvis may refer to:

- Richard Jarvis (American football) (born 1995), American football linebacker
- Richard Jarvis (businessman) (1829–1903), American businessman and industrialist
- Richard Jarvis (politician) (born 1950), American politician
