= Jason Monks =

American politician from Idaho

Majority Leader of the Idaho House of Representatives
- Incumbent
- Assumed office February 12, 2024
- Preceded by: Megan Blanksma

Member of the Idaho House of Representatives from the 22nd district Seat B
- Incumbent
- Assumed office December 1, 2012
- Preceded by: Pete Nielsen (redistricting)

Personal details
- Born: 1967 or 1968 (age 57–58) Ridgecrest, California, U.S.
- Party: Republican
- Education: Brigham Young University (BS)
- Website: Campaign website

Jason A. Monks (born 1967/1968) is an American politician serving as a member of the Idaho House of Representatives from District 22.

Monks served as assistant majority leader from 2019 and 2022 and was selected as majority leader in February 2024.

== Education ==
Monks earned his Bachelor of Science degree from Brigham Young University.

== Elections ==
=== District 22B ===
==== 2020 ====
Monks defeated Hedi Sorenon in the Republican primary with 61.51% of the vote. Monks faces Nina Turner in the general election.

==== 2018 ====
Monks defeated Ronald DeBlauw in the Republican primary with 68% of the vote. Monks was unopposed in the general election.

==== 2016 ====
Monks was unopposed in the Republican primary and the general election.

Monks supported Ted Cruz in the Republican Party presidential primaries, 2016.

==== 2014 ====
Monks was unopposed in the Republican primary and the general election.

==== 2012 ====
With Republican Representative Pete Nielsen redistricted to 23B.

Monks won the four-way Republican Primary with 942 votes (39.7%), defeating former Representative Fred Tilman.

Monks won the General election with 10,080 votes (67.6%) against Democratic nominee Sharon Fisher.

=== 2010 ===
Monks ran for mayor of Meridian, Idaho losing to Tammy de Weerd.

Idaho House of Representatives
Preceded by Megan Blanksma	Majority Leader of the Idaho House of Representatives; 2024–present	Incumbent
