= Alexander MacRobert =

Alexander MacRobert may refer to:

- Alexander Munro MacRobert (1873-1930), Scottish Unionist politician
- Sir Alexander MacRobert of the MacRobert Baronets
- Alexander McRobert (Virginia politician) on List of mayors of Richmond, Virginia
