= McRoberts =

McRoberts is a surname. Notable people with the surname include:

== People ==
- Ally McRoberts (fl. 1972–1983), Scottish footballer
- Bob McRoberts (footballer) (1874–1959), Scottish football player and manager
- Bob McRoberts (American football) (1924–2012)
- Brian McRoberts (1931–1983), solicitor and unionist politician in Northern Ireland
- Briony McRoberts (1957–2013), English actress
- Brit McRoberts (born 1957), Canadian athlete
- George McRoberts (1839–1896), Scottish chemist and early explosives expert
- Hugh McRoberts, an early settler after whom McRoberts Secondary School in Richmond, British Columbia, is named
- John Scott McRoberts (born 1962), Canadian Paralympic sailor
- Josh McRoberts (born 1987), American basketball player
- Joyce McRoberts (fl. 1992–1995), American politician
- Justin McRoberts (born 1971), American author and songwriter
- Mike McRoberts (born 1966), New Zealand television journalist
- Nicholas McRoberts (born 1977), Australian composer and conductor
- Paul McRoberts (born 1992), American football player
- Samuel McRoberts (1799–1843), United States senator
- Samuel McRoberts (U.S. general) (1868–1947)
- William A. McRoberts, Jr., who gave his name to the McRoberts maneuver in obstetrics
- William J. McRoberts (died 1933), American businessman and politician

== See also ==
- MacRobert (disambiguation)
