= McRobertganj =

Neighbourhood in Kanpur

McRobertganj or MacRobertganj or Mc Robert Ganj Colony is an Anglo Indian neighbourhood in the Indian city of Kanpur. McRobertganj was opened in the year 1901 for employees of Cawnpore Woolen Mills. It is named after Sir Alexander MacRobert, the founder of McRobertganj. The settlement was spread over 26 acres with 676 single quarters, 140 double quarters and 12 bungalows. The wireless set provided by the British India Corporation for the use of the residents of McRobertganj Settlement was very popular. The radio programmes from the various stations were found interesting and were greatly enjoyed. The average population during early 20th century was approximately 6200. Factory employers, under a combined scheme, ran the McRobert Gunj Hospital for mill assistants only, i.e., upper class factory workers. In addition there was an American Mission Hospital for women and children.
