= Wendy Jaquet =

American politician from Idaho

Member of the Idaho House of Representatives from the 25, seat A district
- In office December 1, 2002 – December 1, 2012
- Preceded by: Scott Bedke
- Succeeded by: Maxine Bell

Member of the Idaho House of Representatives from the 21, seat A district
- In office December 1, 1994 – December 1, 2002
- Preceded by: Clint Stennett
- Succeeded by: Bill Sali

Personal details
- Born: September 16, 1943 (age 83) Seattle, Washington
- Party: Democratic
- Spouse: Jim Jaquet
- Education: University of Washington
- Website: wendyjaquet.com

Wendy S. Jaquet (born September 16, 1943) is an American politician from Idaho. A former member of the Idaho House of Representatives, she represented District 25, which comprises all of Blaine, Camas, Lincoln, and Gooding counties.

Jaquet had served several terms as Minority Leader, leading the Democratic caucus in the Idaho House. However, in 2009 she relinquished the position to take a seat on the Joint Financial Appropriations Committee. She was succeeded as minority leader by Rep. John Rusche of Lewiston.

Jaquet served on the House Revenue and Taxation Committee and the Energy, Environment and Technology Committee. In previous sessions Jaquet has served on the Health and Welfare, Judiciary and Rules, Environmental Affairs, Education, Agriculture, Natural Resources and State Affairs Committees. As the House Democratic Leader, Jaquet also serves on Legislative Council and the House Ways and Means Committee. The latter is a leadership committee which approves legislation for printing late in the session. Legislative Council establishes the policies and procedures for the upcoming legislative session and evaluates the prior sessions for improvements. In her first term Wendy served on the interim committee on County Optional Forms of Government. She has served on Governor Batt's Medicaid Reform Committee, a review of the Personnel System, the interim committee on Property Rights, the Reading Committee, the 2002 Olympic Committee and the Governor's Council on Adolescent Pregnancy. She was appointed to the Governor's Safe Schools Committee, the County CAFO Committee, she co-chaired the Rules rewrite of the Children's Treatment efforts, served on the Privacy interim committee, and the Governor's Committee on Rural Economic Development, the Sales Tax Evaluation Task Force, and the Natural Resources and Property Taxes Committees. She served on the Energy Interim Committee.

Prior to serving in the Idaho Legislature, Jaquet was the executive director of the Sun Valley-Ketchum Chamber of Commerce during a period of membership and financial growth and success. Jaquet coordinated the Ketchum Wagon Days and served as grand marshal in September 2001.

Wendy and her husband Jim, who retired as Ketchum's city administrator, are originally from Seattle, Washington, having both attended the University of Washington and obtaining degrees in Political Science and graduate degrees in Public Administration. Their two married sons, Michael and Brian, currently live and work in San Mateo and New York City.

Jaquet was not candidate for re-election in 2012. She was later appointed to the Board of Health and Welfare by Gov. C.L. "Butch" Otter.
