= Megan Kiska =

American military officer and politician from Idaho

Member of the Idaho House of Representatives from the 21st, seat B district
- In office May 2019 – December 1, 2020
- Preceded by: Thomas Dayley
- Succeeded by: Greg Ferch

Personal details
- Party: Republican
- Spouse: Robin
- Children: 2
- Education: CSU Hayward, Air Force Technical School, UC Berkeley, Oklahoma University
- Occupation: IANG Officer, politician
- Military career
- Allegiance: United States
- Branch: United States Air Force, Idaho Air National Guard
- Rank: Captain
- Unit: 124th Fighter Wing

Megan Kiska is an American military officer in the Idaho Air National Guard and politician from Idaho. Kiska was a Republican member of Idaho House of Representatives for District 21, Seat B.

== Education ==
Kiska earned a bachelor's degree from California State University, Hayward in California. Kiska graduated from Air Force Technical School. Kiska graduated from Reserve Officer Training Corps at the University of California, Berkeley. Kiska earned a Master's degree in international relations and affairs from University of Oklahoma.

== Career ==
In 2006, Kiska became an Airport Operations Manager at Denver International Airport in Denver, Colorado, until 2010.

In 2010, Kiska became an Area Manager with Amazon, until 2012.

Kiska, a captain, was an inspector general and real property officer for the 124th Fighter Wing, a unit of the Idaho Air National Guard, in Idaho.

In May 2019, Kiska was appointed by Idaho governor Brad Little to serve as a Republican member of Idaho House of Representatives for District 21, seat B to fill the vacancy from Thomas Dayley.

== Personal life ==
Kiska's husband is Robin. They have two children. Kiska and her family live in Boise, Idaho.
