= Tom Dayley =

American politician from Idaho

Member of the Ada County Commission
- Incumbent
- Assumed office January 2023
- Preceded by: Kendra Kenyon
- Constituency: Third District

Member of the Idaho House of Representatives
- In office December 1, 2012 – April 28, 2019
- Preceded by: Clifford Bayer
- Succeeded by: Megan Kiska
- Constituency: 21st district Seat B

Personal details
- Born: February 15, 1944 (age 82) Burley, Idaho
- Party: Republican
- Education: Brigham Young University; University of Southern California
- Website: tomdayleyrep21b.com

Thomas E. "Tom" Dayley (born February 15, 1944, in Burley, Idaho) was a Republican Idaho State Representative from 2012 to 2019 representing District 21 in the B seat. Dayley served as Idaho State Executive Director of USDA Farm Service Agency under Ronald Reagan and Donald Trump. Dayley was appointed by Speaker Scott Bedke to Idaho's Independent Redistricting Commission, after Bedke's first choice (John Simpson) was deemed ineligible due to lobbying rules.

== Education ==
Dayley earned his BA degrees in political science and Spanish from Brigham Young University and his MA in international relations from the University of Southern California.

== Elections ==
District 21 House Seat B - Part of Ada County
Year	Candidate	Votes	Pct	Candidate	Votes	Pct	Candidate	Votes	Pct	Candidate	Votes	Pct
2010 Primary	Thomas Dayley	2,034	37.2%	Cliff Bayer (incumbent)	3,437	62.8%						
2012 Primary	Tom Dayley	1,052	34.3%	Mike Vuittonet	703	22.9%	Lori Shewmaker	693	22.6%	Charles Hoffman	618	20.2%
2012 General	Tom Dayley	12,871	65.7%	Erin Zaleski	6,729	34.3%						
2014 Primary	Tom Dayley (incumbent)	2,521	73.9%	Ricky Bowman	889	26.1%						
2014 General	Tom Dayley (incumbent)	9,950	77.9%	Joe Hautzinger	2,828	22.1%						
2016 Primary	Tom Dayley (incumbent)	2,223	100%									
2016 General	Tom Dayley (incumbent)	14,454	65.7%	Cindy Thorngren	7,531	34.3%						
