= John Peavey =

American politician from Idaho (1933–2024)

Member of the Idaho Senate from District 21
- In office December 1, 1992 – December 1, 1994
- Preceded by: Mike Burkett
- Succeeded by: Clint Stennett

Member of the Idaho Senate from District 22
- In office December 1, 1984 – December 1, 1992
- Succeeded by: Joyce McRoberts

Personal details
- Born: September 1, 1933 Twin Falls, Idaho, U.S.
- Died: June 16, 2024 (aged 90)
- Party: Republican; Democratic (after 1978)
- Spouse: Diane Josephy Peavey
- Parent(s): Art Peavey and Mary Brooks
- Education: Northwestern University
- Known for: Idaho State Senator

John Thomas Peavey (September 1, 1933 – June 16, 2024) was an American rancher and Democratic politician from Carey, Idaho. Peavey served in the Idaho Senate from 1969 to 1976 and from 1978 to 1994.

From a young age Peavey worked on the ranch founded by his grandfather, U.S. Senator John Thomas. In 1969 he succeeded his mother, Mary Brooks in the Idaho Senate as a Republican after she was appointed director of the United States Mint by President Richard M. Nixon.

In 1974, after repeated attempts to pass a Sunshine Law; a law requiring lobbyists to register and political campaign disclosure, in the legislature were unsuccessful, Peavey led a successful statewide campaign to pass one by ballot initiative.

In 1994 Peavey was the Democratic nominee for lieutenant governor. He was defeated by the Republican incumbent Butch Otter, who was later elected governor in 2006.

Peavey died on June 16, 2024, at the age of 90.

== Elections ==
District 22 Senate - Blaine, Camas, Gooding, and Lincoln Counties
	Candidate	Votes	Pct	Candidate	Votes	Pct	Candidate	Votes	Pct
1984 General	John Peavey (incumbent)	6,694	53.2%	Wes Trounson (incumbent)	5,887	46.8%			
1986 General	John Peavey (incumbent)	6,254	54.1%	John Sandy	5,313	45.9%			
1988 General	John Peavey (incumbent)	7,011	55.9%	John Sandy	5,525	44.1%			
1990 Primary	John Peavey (incumbent)	958	100%						
1990 General	John Peavey (incumbent)	6,975	68.9%	Darrell de Fabry	2,913	28.8%	Joseph A. Rohner III	232	2.3%
