= Megan Blanksma =

American politician

Majority Leader of the Idaho House of Representatives
- In office December 1, 2022 – February 8, 2024
- Preceded by: Mike Moyle
- Succeeded by: Jason Monks

Member of the Idaho House of Representatives
- In office December 1, 2016 – November 30, 2024
- Preceded by: Pete Nielsen
- Succeeded by: Faye Thompson
- Constituency: 23rd district Seat B (2016–2020); 8th district Seat B (2020–2024)

Personal details
- Born: Nampa, Idaho, U.S.
- Party: Republican
- Education: University of Idaho (BS)

Megan C. Blanksma is an American politician who served as a member of the Idaho House of Representatives from District 8 in seat B. A member of the Republican Party, she served as the majority leader in the House of Representatives from 2022 to February 8, 2024, when she was removed due to disagreements within the Republican caucus.

== Early life and education ==
Blanksma was born and raised in Nampa. She graduated from Nampa High School and served as a legislative page in the Idaho Senate during her senior year. Later, she earned a Bachelor of Science in economics from the University of Idaho.

== Career ==
From 2014 to 2016, Blanksma served as Chair of the Elmore County Republican Party, after many years as a volunteer in many capacities at the county and state level. She also serves on the St. Luke's Elmore Community Board.

=== Idaho House of Representatives ===
Blanksma challenged 14-year incumbent Pete Nielsen in the Republican primary in 2016. She was endorsed by Governor Butch Otter. After securing the nomination, Blanksma faced only independent and third party opposition in the general election and was elected to the seat.

Amid the COVID-19 pandemic, Blanksma criticized the Idaho Central District Health for endorsing a statement by Lauren McLean, the Democratic mayor of Boise, who supported Centers for Disease Control and Prevention guidance regarding masking and vaccines.

==== Committee assignments ====
- Heath and Welfare Committee
- Local Government Committee
- Resources and Conservation Committee

== Personal life ==
Blanksma and her husband, Jeff, live on a farm in Hammett, Idaho.

== Elections ==
District 23 House Seat B - Elmore, Owyhee, and a portion of Twin Falls County
Year	Candidate	Votes	Pct	Candidate	Votes	Pct	Candidate	Votes	Pct
2016 Primary	Megan Blanksma	3,387	71.0%	Pete Nielsen (incumbent)	1,052	22.1%	Justin Freeman	329	6.9%
2016 General	Megan Blanksma	10,810	77.1%	Bill Chisholm	2,335	16.6%	Christopher Jenkins	889	6.3%
2018 Primary	Megan Blanksma	4,328	100%						
2018 General	Megan Blanksma	10,441	97.9%	Tony Ullrich (Write-in)	220	2.1%			
2020 Primary	Megan Blanksma	6,112	100%						
2020 General	Megan Blanksma	12,941	74.5%	Michael Oliver	3,234	18.6%	Tony Ullrich	1,186	6.8%

District 8 House Seat B - Boise, Custer, Elmore, and Valley Counties
Year	Candidate	Votes	Pct	Candidate	Votes	Pct	Candidate	Votes	Pct
2022 Primary	Megan Blanksma	6,995	100%						
2022 General	Megan Blanksma	12,604	83.6%	Tony Ullrich	2,482	16.5%			

Idaho House of Representatives
Preceded by Mike Moyle	Majority Leader of the Idaho House of Representatives; 2022–2024	Succeeded by Jason Monks
