= John Sandy =

American politician

Idaho Republican Party
- In office 2002 – June 2004
- Preceded by: Trent Clark
- Succeeded by: J. Kirk Sullivan

Member of the Idaho Senate from District 22
- In office 1995 – December 1, 2002
- Preceded by: Joyce McRoberts
- Succeeded by: Fred Kennedy

Personal details
- Born: June 8, 1948 (age 78) Twin Falls, Idaho
- Party: Republican
- Spouse: Robin
- Children: 1

John Sandy is a former chair of the Idaho Republican Party and Idaho State Senator serving District 22.

== Personal life, education and career ==
Sandy has a Bachelor of Science degree from the University of Idaho, and has owned livestock businesses and a small hydroelectric project.

John and his wife Robin have 1 child.

== Political career ==
Sandy was chair of the University of Idaho College Republicans during the 1960s and later served as Vice Chairman of Idaho Republican Party. He was appointed by Governor Phil Batt to serve District 22 in the Idaho Senate in 1995. He won election for his first full term in 1996, and was re-elected in 1998 and 2000. He served his assistant majority leader of the state Senate from 1996 - 2002.

Sandy was Chief of Staff during Jim Risch's seven-month tenure as Governor in 2006, and headed Risch's transition team after the Risch was elected to the U.S. Senate in 2006, later also serving as his chief of staff, till 2019.

Sandy was unopposed for chair of the Idaho Republican Party in 2002. He chose not to run for reelection as state chair in 2004.

Sandy was an elector for George W. Bush for Idaho in 2004.

== Elections ==
District 22 Senate - Blaine, Camas, Gooding, and Lincoln Counties
	Candidate	Votes	Pct	Candidate	Votes	Pct
1986 General	John Sandy	5,313	45.9%	John Peavey (incumbent)	6,254	54.1%
1988 General	John Sandy	5,525	44.1%	John Peavey (incumbent)	7,011	55.9%

District 22 Senate - Part of Gooding and Twin Falls Counties
Year	Candidate	Votes	Pct	Candidate	Votes	Pct
1996 Primary	John Sandy (incumbent)	1,503	100%			
1996 General	John Sandy (incumbent)	7,076	61.9%	George Juker	4,359	38.1%
1998 Primary	John Sandy (incumbent)	2,032	68.0%	Doug Hansen	958	32.0%
1998 General	John Sandy (incumbent)	4,796	59.2%	Bill Chisholm	3,303	40.8%
2000 Primary	John Sandy (incumbent)	2,114	76.5%	George W. Anthony	651	23.5%
2000 General	John Sandy (incumbent)	7,522	69.0%	Carol Lee Stennett	3,386	31.0%

Party political offices
Preceded by Trent Clark (Idaho)	Chair of the Idaho Republican Party; June 2002 - June 2004	Succeeded by J. Kirk Sullivan
