= Idaho's 22nd legislative district =

American legislative district

Idaho's 22nd legislative district is one of 35 districts of the Idaho Legislature. It is currently represented by Lori Den Hartog, Republican of Meridian, John Vander Woude, Republican of Meridian, and Jason Monks, Republican of Meridian.

== District profile ==
=== 1984–1992 ===
From 1994 to 1992, District 22 consisted of Blaine, Camas, Gooding, and Lincoln counties.

Legislature	Session	Senate	House Seat A	House Seat B
47th (1984 - 1986)	1st	John Peavey (D)	Gary Robbins (R)	Mack Neibaur (R)
47th (1984 - 1986)	2nd	John Peavey (D)	Gary Robbins (R)	Mack Neibaur (R)
48th (1986 - 1988)	1st	John Peavey (D)	Gary Robbins (R)	Mack Neibaur (R)
48th (1986 - 1988)	2nd	John Peavey (D)	Gary Robbins (R)	Mack Neibaur (R)
49th (1988 - 1990)	1st	John Peavey (D)	Thomas Morrison (R)	Mack Neibaur (R)
49th (1988 - 1990)	2nd	John Peavey (D)	Thomas Morrison (R)	Mack Neibaur (R)
50th (1990 - 1992)	1st	John Peavey (D)	Clint Stennett (D)	Pattie Nafziger (D)
50th (1990 - 1992)	2nd	John Peavey (D)	Clint Stennett (D)	Pattie Nafziger (D)

=== 1992–2002 ===
From 1992 to 2002, District 22 consisted of a portion of Gooding and Twin Falls counties.

Legislature	Session	Senate	House Seat A	House Seat B
51st (1992 - 1994)	1st	Joyce McRoberts (R)	Celia Gould (R)	Douglas Jones (R)
51st (1992 - 1994)	2nd	Joyce McRoberts (R)	Celia Gould (R)	Douglas Jones (R)
52nd (1994 - 1996)	1st	Joyce McRoberts (R)	Celia Gould (R)	Douglas Jones (R)
52nd (1994 - 1996)	2nd	John Sandy (R)	Celia Gould (R)	Douglas Jones (R)
53rd (1996 - 1998)	1st	John Sandy (R)	Celia Gould (R)	Douglas Jones (R)
53rd (1996 - 1998)	2nd	John Sandy (R)	Celia Gould (R)	Douglas Jones (R)
54th (1998 - 2000)	1st	John Sandy (R)	Celia Gould (R)	Douglas Jones (R)
54th (1998 - 2000)	2nd	John Sandy (R)	Celia Gould (R)	Douglas Jones (R)
55th (2000 - 2002)	1st	John Sandy (R)	Celia Gould (R)	Douglas Jones (R)
55th (2000 - 2002)	2nd	John Sandy (R)	Celia Gould (R)	Douglas Jones (R)

=== 2002–2012 ===
From 2002 to 2012, District 22 consisted of Boise and Elmore counties.

Legislature	Session	Senate	House Seat A	House Seat B
57th (2002 - 2004)	1st	Fred Kennedy (D)	Rich Wills (R)	Pete Nielsen (R)
57th (2002 - 2004)	2nd	Fred Kennedy (D)	Rich Wills (R)	Pete Nielsen (R)
58th (2004 - 2006)	1st	Tim Corder (R)	Rich Wills (R)	Pete Nielsen (R)
58th (2004 - 2006)	2nd	Tim Corder (R)	Rich Wills (R)	Pete Nielsen (R)
59th (2006 - 2008)	1st	Tim Corder (R)	Rich Wills (R)	Pete Nielsen (R)
59th (2006 - 2008)	2nd	Tim Corder (R)	Rich Wills (R)	Pete Nielsen (R)
60th (2008 - 2010)	1st	Tim Corder (R)	Rich Wills (R)	Pete Nielsen (R)
60th (2008 - 2010)	2nd	Tim Corder (R)	Rich Wills (R)	Pete Nielsen (R)
61st (2010 - 2012)	1st	Tim Corder (R)	Rich Wills (R)	Pete Nielsen (R)
61st (2010 - 2012)	2nd	Tim Corder (R)	Rich Wills (R)	Pete Nielsen (R)

=== 2012–present ===
District 22 currently consists of a portion of Ada County.

Legislature	Session	Senate	House Seat A	House Seat B
62nd (2012 - 2014)	1st	Russ Fulcher (R)	John Vander Woude (R)	Jason Monks (R)
62nd (2012 - 2014)	2nd	Russ Fulcher (R)	John Vander Woude (R)	Jason Monks (R)
63rd (2014 - 2016)	1st	Lori Den Hartog (R)	John Vander Woude (R)	Jason Monks (R)
63rd (2014 - 2016)	2nd	Lori Den Hartog (R)	John Vander Woude (R)	Jason Monks (R)
64th (2016 - 2018)	1st	Lori Den Hartog (R)	John Vander Woude (R)	Jason Monks (R)
64th (2016 - 2018)	2nd	Lori Den Hartog (R)	John Vander Woude (R)	Jason Monks (R)
65th (2018 - 2020)	1st	Lori Den Hartog (R)	John Vander Woude (R)	Jason Monks (R)
65th (2018 - 2020)	2nd	Lori Den Hartog (R)	John Vander Woude (R)	Jason Monks (R)
66th (2020 - 2022)	1st	Lori Den Hartog (R)	John Vander Woude (R)	Jason Monks (R)
66th (2020 - 2022)	2nd	Lori Den Hartog (R)	John Vander Woude (R)	Jason Monks (R)

== See also ==
- List of Idaho senators
- List of Idaho representatives
