= Tim Ridinger =

American politician from Idaho

Member of the Idaho House of Representatives from the 21st, seat B district
- In office December 1994 – December 2002
- Preceded by: Pattie Nafziger
- Succeeded by: Fred Tilman

Member of the Idaho House of Representatives from the 25th, seat B district
- In office December 2002 – December 2004
- Preceded by: Bruce Newcomb
- Succeeded by: Donna Pence

Personal details
- Born: May 24, 1956 (age 70) Sacramento, California
- Party: Republican
- Spouse: Penny Ridinger

Tim Ridinger is an American politician from Idaho. Ridinger is a former member of Idaho House of Representatives.

== Early life ==
On May 24, 1956, Ridinger was born in Sacramento, California.

== Education ==
Ridinger earned a bachelor's degree in business administration, real estate, from Boise State University.

== Career ==
In 1986, Ridinger became mayor of Shoshone, Idaho, until 2004.

On November 8, 1994, Ridinger won the election and became a Republican member of Idaho House of Representatives for District 21, seat B. Ridinger defeated Pattie Nafziger with 53.1% of the votes. On November 5, 1996, as an incumbent, Ridinger won the election and continued serving District 21, seat B. Ridinger defeated Darren Clemenhagen with 58.5% of the votes. On November 3, 1998, as an incumbent, Ridinger won the election unopposed and continued serving District 21, seat B. On November 7, 2000, as an incumbent, Ridinger won the election and continued serving District 21, seat B. Ridinger defeated Richard "Dick" Andreasen with 61% of the votes.

On November 5, 2002, Ridinger won the election and became a Republican member of Idaho House of Representatives for District 25, seat B. Ridinger defeated Donna Pence with 50.6% of the votes. On November 2, 2004, Ridinger lost the election. Ridinger was defeated by Donna Pence 51% of the votes. Ridinger received 49% of the votes.

== Personal life ==
Ridinger's wife is Penny Ridinger. They have four children. Ridinger and his family live in Shoshone, Idaho.
