= British India Corporation =

Central Public Sector Undertaking

Coordinates: 26.476393°N 80.339617°E

- Company type: Central Public Sector Undertaking
- Industry: Woollen Mills
- Founded: 1872
- Headquarters: Kanpur, Uttar Pradesh, India
- Number of employees: 1,800

British India Corporation Limited (BIC) is a central public sector undertaking under the ownership of the Ministry of Textiles, Government of India. The CPSU produces textiles for use by civilians and the Indian armed forces. It manufactures the popular "Lal-imli" and "Dhariwal" brands of woollen products. The CPSU was established in 1872 or 1876 by Sir Alexander MacRobert as a CPSU when he combined his six companies into one enterprise. MacRobert died on 22 June 1922 (Note: Sir Alexander changed the spelling of his name from McRobert to MacRobert when he was awarded a baronetcy.) and his widow, Rachel, Lady MacRobert, assumed the role of director until her eldest son, Alasdair, became chairman in 1937.

Its date of incorporation in the Registrar of Companies is 24 February 1920. In 1981, it was nationalised and taken over by the Government of India. It has not generated profit since 1989.

Headquartered in Kanpur, BIC nominally operates two woollen mills in Kanpur and Dhariwal (Punjab). In 2006 the CPSU employed over 2,700 people and had aggregated revenues of ₹373 million (US$3.9 million).

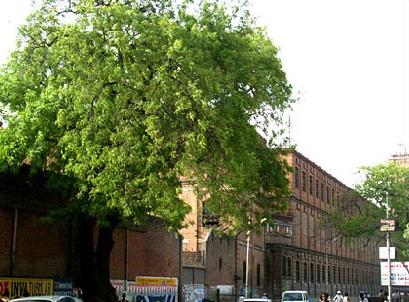
A view of Lal Imli factory

It ceased manufacturing in 2005, but still employs 1,800 people. New weaving machines installed in 2005 have never been used.
