= MacRobert Award =

UK engineering prize

The MacRobert Award is regarded as the leading prize recognising UK innovation in engineering by corporations. The winning team receives a gold medal and a cash sum of £50,000.

The annual award process begins with an invitation to companies to submit entries, by the end of January. The judging panel for the awards, which includes several Fellows of the Royal Academy of Engineering, then selects a shortlist of six to eight candidates. Following site visits, the judges produce a shortlist of three or four candidates for visits by the whole judging panel.

The judges consider three key criteria when assessing entries:

- Innovation
- Commercial success
- Benefit to society

The guidance for submissions explains that "All three criteria may be interpreted broadly to reflect the very diverse nature of engineering and its role in every aspect of society".

In 2019, the 50th anniversary year of the awards, Royal Mail issued a series of postage stamps marking "the marvels of British engineering", with a new set of 10 stamps that featured, along with other engineering achievements, three past winners of the MacRobert Award.

== History ==
The award is named in honour of Rachel, Lady MacRobert (1884–1954). It was established in 1969 by the MacRobert Trust. In 1979 the Royal Academy of Engineering took on the administration, supported by the Worshipful Company of Engineers and industry sponsors.

The criteria for judging entries have changed over the years. The original remit was to reward “an outstanding contribution” made “by way of innovation in the fields of engineering or the other physical technologies or in the application of the physical sciences, which has enhanced or will enhance the national prestige and prosperity of the United Kingdom of Great Britain and Northern Ireland”. The first rule change was to include commercial success as a criterion. This was done to exclude entries that failed to have any lasting impact in the marketplace.

== Winners ==
- 1969 - Freeman Fox & Partners - for the superstructure of the Severn Bridge and Rolls-Royce - for the Pegasus Engine (Joint Winners)
- 1970 - British Petroleum - for new surveying techniques
- 1971 - The Gas Council - for innovative manufacturing processes
- 1972 - EMI Limited - for advances in diagnosing Brain disease using X-rays
- 1973 - Dunlop - for the Denovo tyre
- 1974 - ICI Limited (Agricultural division)
- 1975 - Westland Helicopters "For the semi-rigid rotor system and conformal gearing of the Lynx helicopter" and British Railways Board "For developments in railway vehicle suspensions" (Joint Winners)
- 1976 - No award.
- 1977 - Royal Signals Research Establishment and Malvern Instruments "For the Malvern Correlator which measures the movement of particles or molecules"
- 1978 - Pilkington Brothers Limited "For the Triplex Ten-Twenty laminated windscreen for cars and aircraft"
- 1979 - Post Office Telecommunications
- 1980 - Johnson Matthey Group
- 1981 - Lucas CAV Limited
- 1982 - Kaldair Limited
- 1983 - Ruston Gas Turbines
- 1984 - Netlon Limited
- 1985 - The National Institute of Agricultural Engineering and Rolls-Royce (Joint Winners)
- 1986 - Oxford Instruments Group
- 1987 - Renishaw plc
- 1988 - Quantel Limited
- 1989 - British Gas
- 1990 - The Science and Engineering Research Council
- 1991 - Rover Group and Defence Research Agency and GEC Sensors (Joint Winners)
- 1992 - BP International
- 1993 - ICI Klea
- 1994 - Soil Machine Dynamics
- 1995 - British Gas plc and Gill Electronic R&D
- 1996 - Rolls-Royce plc - for the Trent aero-engine
- 1997 - Whipp & Bourne (A division of FKI plc)
- 1998 - Norton Healthcare Limited
- 1999 - Buro Happold - for the Millennium Dome design
- 2000 - Johnson Matthey
- 2001 - Sensaura
- 2002 - Cambridge Display Technology (CDT) − for light emitting polymers
- 2003 - Randox Laboratories
- 2004 - IBM − for the WebSphere MQ
- 2005 - CSR
- 2006 - Optos plc
- 2007 - Process Systems Enterprise
- 2008 - Touch Bionics for the I-LIMB bionic hand
- 2009 - Arup for the Beijing National Aquatics Center
- 2010 - Inmarsat for its Broadband Global Area Network (BGAN)
- 2011 - Microsoft Research Cambridge for the machine learning work on the human motion capture subsystem of Kinect
- 2012 - Jaguar Land Rover for design and innovation building Range Rover Evoque
- 2013 - RealVNC for the innovation of VNC Remote Access Software
- 2014 - Cobalt Light Systems for the innovation of Insight100 airport security liquid scanner
- 2015 - Artemis Intelligent Power for the innovation of Digital Displacement hydraulic transmission. The judging panel was chaired by Dame Sue Ion.
- 2016 - Blatchford for the world's most 'intelligent' prosthetic limb. The judging panel was chaired by Dame Sue Ion.
- 2017 - Raspberry Pi "for its inexpensive credit card-sized microcomputers, which are redefining how people engage with computing, inspiring students to learn coding and computer science and providing innovative control solutions for industry."
- 2018 - Owlstone Medical "for its ReCIVA Breath Sampler, the first device capable of capturing breath samples for analysis in a robust and reproducible way"
- 2019 - Bombardier Aerospace for its resin-infused advanced composite wing that minimises an aircraft’s environmental impact by reducing weight and fuel consumption in flight, and waste during manufacture.
- 2020 - JCB "for developing and manufacturing the world’s first volume-produced fully electric digger (19C-1E), with zero exhaust emissions, improved productivity, outstanding noise and vibration characteristics and emission-free at point of use for use inside buildings."
- 2021 - DnaNudge "for its pioneering genetic testing technology that enables consumers to shop more healthily – nudged by their DNA plus lifestyle"
- 2022 - Quanta Dialysis Technologies "for creating a compact and portable dialysis machine, allowing more flexible and accessible care for patients with renal failure"
- 2023 - Ceres Power "for its pioneering clean energy technology, including fuel cells for power generation and electrolysers for green hydrogen"
- 2024 - Google DeepMind "whose GraphCast technology uses cutting-edge machine learning algorithms and vast data sets to give highly accurate and timely weather predictions up to ten days in advance."
- 2025 - OrganOx "for their breakthrough devices preserving livers and kidneys outside the body for extended periods of time. The device for livers is already significantly increasing transplant success, reducing healthcare costs, and saving lives globally."

== See also ==
- List of engineering awards
