= Cliff Bayer (politician) =

American politician (born 1964)

Member of the Idaho Senate from the 21st district
- In office December 1, 2012 – January 2019
- Preceded by: Russ Fulcher
- Succeeded by: Regina Bayer

Member of the Idaho House of Representatives from the 21B district
- In office December 2004 – December 1, 2012
- Preceded by: Fred Tilman
- Succeeded by: Thomas Dayley

Personal details
- Born: August 16, 1964 (age 61)
- Party: Republican
- Education: Boise State University (BS)

Clifford R. "Cliff" Bayer (born August 16, 1964) is an American politician who served as a member of the Idaho Legislature from 2004 to 2019.

== Education ==
Bayer graduated from Borah High School and earned his Bachelor of Science degree in biology from Boise State University.

== Career ==
Bayer was elected to the Idaho House of Representatives in 2004 and served until 2012. He served as a member of the Idaho Senate from 2012 to 2019. He resigned from the Idaho Senate to serve as chief of staff for Congressman Russ Fulcher.

== Elections and appointment ==
District 21 House Seat B - Part of Ada County
Year	Candidate	Votes	Pct	Candidate	Votes	Pct
2002 primary	Cliff Bayer	1,905	40.0%	Fred Tilman (incumbent)	2,853	60.0%
2004 primary	Cliff Bayer (incumbent)	1,180	100%			
2004 general	Cliff Bayer (incumbent)	15,593	100%			
2006 primary	Cliff Bayer (incumbent)	3,786	100%			
2006 general	Cliff Bayer (incumbent)	13,536	100%			
2008 primary	Cliff Bayer (incumbent)	2,679	58.4%	Jefferson Hunt West	1,911	41.6%
2008 general	Cliff Bayer (incumbent)	17,097	66.2%	Steven Dillehay	8,732	33.8%
2010 primary	Cliff Bayer (incumbent)	3,437	62.8%	Thomas Dayley	2,034	37.2%
2010 general	Cliff Bayer (incumbent)	13,661	73.3%	Sean Carrick	4,985	26.7%

District 21 Senate - Part of Ada County
Year	Candidate	Votes	Pct	Candidate	Votes	Pct
2012 primary	Cliff Bayer	2,775	55.5%			
2012 general	Cliff Bayer	12,858	64.8%	Kirsten Hooker	6,978	35.2%
2014 primary	Cliff Bayer (incumbent)	3,172	100%			
2014 general	Cliff Bayer (incumbent)	11,246	100%			
2016 primary	Cliff Bayer (incumbent)	2,234	100.0%			
2016 general	Cliff Bayer (incumbent)	17,462	100%			
