= Richard Jarvis (politician) =

American politician

Member of the Idaho House of Representatives from the 21st, seat A district
- In office December 2008 – December 2010
- Preceded by: John Vander Woude
- Succeeded by: John Vander Woude

Personal details
- Born: October 6, 1950 (age 75) Boise, Idaho
- Party: Republican
- Spouse: Mary Jarvis
- Children: 6
- Education: Brigham Young University
- Occupation: Insurance agent, politician

Richard Jarvis (politician) is a former American politician from Idaho. Jarvis is a former Republican member of Idaho House of Representatives.

== Early life ==
On October 6, 1950, Jarvis was born in Boise, Idaho.

== Education ==
In 1974, Jarvis earned a Bachelor of Science degree in Business Management from Brigham Young University.

== Career ==
Jarvis was an insurance agent.

== Elections ==
=== 2010 ===
Jarvis was defeated by John Vander Woude in the Republican primary taking only 38.3% of the vote; Michael D. Roy also ran in the primary taking only 14.1% of the vote.

=== 2008 ===
Jarvis defeated John Vander Woude in the Republican primary with 50.7% of the vote (65 votes). Jarvis defeated Democratic nominee Sharon L. Fisher with 64% of the vote.

== Personal life ==
Jarvis' wife is Mary. They have six children. Jarvis and his family live in Meridian, Idaho.
