= Joyce McRoberts =

American politician from Idaho (1941–2025)

Member of the Idaho Senate from the 22nd district
- In office December 1, 1992 – July 29, 1995
- Preceded by: John Peavey
- Succeeded by: John Sandy

Personal details
- Born: Belva Joyce Stevens; July 31, 1941 Salmon, Idaho, U.S.
- Died: January 2, 2025 (aged 83)
- Party: Republican

Belva Joyce McRoberts (née Stevens; July 31, 1941 – January 2, 2025) was an American politician who served in the Idaho Senate from the 22nd district from 1992 to 1995. She resigned effective July 29, 1995, to take the role of Magic Valley regional director of the Idaho Department of Health and Welfare. She died on January 2, 2025, at the age of 83, having lived for several years with cancer and dementia.
