= Dhariwal, India =

Dhariwal
- Town
- Location in Punjab, India Dhariwal (India)
- Coordinates: 31.95°N 75.32°E
- Country: India
- State: Punjab
- District: Gurdaspur

Government
  - Type: Municipal corporation
  - Body: Nagar Palika
- Elevation: 253 m (830 ft)

Population (2001)
  - Total: 18,706

Languages
  - Official: Punjabi
- Time zone: UTC+5:30 (IST)
- Postal code: 143519

Dhariwal is a fifth largest town and a municipal council in Gurdaspur district in the state of Punjab, India. Dhariwal was most famous for its woolen mill. This town is situated on the banks of river Upper Bari Duba and is 13 km away from Gurdaspur on the Gurdaspur-Batala highway. Dhariwal, like the rest of north-western India, features a humid subtropical climate. Average yearly precipitation is about 925mm (36.4 inches), 70% of it receives during monsoon season (June-September). Winter is also wet. June is the hottest while January is coldest month. In winter, dense fog persists for three to five days. As a result, day temperature drops to single digits. During May and June, dust storms followed by intense spells for short intervals are not uncommon. Monsoon arrives in the end of June and withdrawal starts around the third week of September. The town is prone to heatwaves during summer and chills during winter.

== Demographics ==
According to 2010 estimates, it had a population of 23,158 inhabitants.

As of 2001 India census, Dhariwal had a population of 18,706. Males constitute 52% of the population and females 48%. Dhariwal has an average literacy rate of 74%, higher than the national average of 59.5%. Male literacy is 78% and female literacy is 70%. In Dhariwal, 10% of the population is under six years of age.

The table below shows the population of different religious groups in Dhariwal city and their gender ratio, as of 2011 census.

Population by religious groups in Dhariwal city, 2011 census
Religion	Total	Female	Male	Gender ratio
Hindu	9,584	4,565	5,019	909
Sikh	4,085	1,975	2,110	936
Christian	3,001	1,462	1,539	949
Muslim	64	31	33	939
Buddhist	5	2	3	666
Jain	2	2	0	--
Other religions	19	11	8	1375
Not stated	12	6	6	1000
Total	16,772	8,054	8,718	923

== History ==
During British rule, the New Egerton Woolen Mills (established in 1880 then purchased by Sir Alexander MacRobert in 1884) produced woolen worsted and hosiery of all kinds - in 1904 the company employed 908 people. These mills were famous throughout colonial India and were the only mills in Punjab at that time.

== See also ==
- Kakazai
