= DnaNudge =

British medical testing company, 2015–2024

- Industry: Healthcare
- Headquarters: London, England
- Website: dnanudge.com

DnaNudge was a British company specializing in DNA testing. In late 2020, during the COVID-19 pandemic, it introduced COVID Nudge, a rapid RT-PCR test for COVID-19. The device uses a disposable sample capsule that is placed into a sample processor box, and gives results in 90 minutes. As of August 2020, the British government had ordered 5000 of the sample processor boxes.

Sir Richard Sykes joined its board in 2021.

The company went into administration in 2024.

== Origins ==
The company was founded by Chris Toumazou in 2015.

== See also ==
- Imperial College London, associated institution
