= Pete Nielsen =

American politician from Idaho (1938–2019)

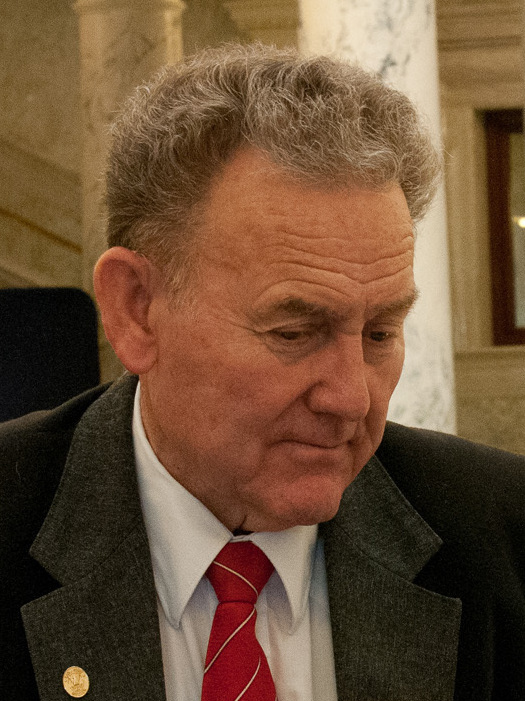

Member of the Idaho House of Representatives
- In office December 1, 2002 – November 30, 2016
- Preceded by: Douglas Jones (redistricting)
- Succeeded by: Megan Blanksma
- Constituency: 22nd district Seat B (2002–2012); 23rd district Seat B (2012–2016)

Personal details
- Born: March 15, 1938 Burley, Idaho, U.S.
- Died: July 21, 2019 (aged 81) Mountain Home, Idaho, U.S.
- Party: Republican
- Spouse: Connie
- Children: 8
- Education: Brigham Young University; Utah State University
- Profession: Farmer, insurance agent

Milton Peter Nielsen (March 15, 1938 – July 21, 2019) was an American politician who was a Republican Idaho State Representative from 2002 to 2012, representing District 22 in the B seat. From 2012 to 2016 he served in the Idaho House of Representatives representing District 23 in the B seat. Nielsen was born in Burley, Idaho on March 15, 1938, and died in Mountain Home, Idaho on July 21, 2019, at the age of 81.

== Elections ==
District 12 - Elmore and Owyhee Counties
Year	Candidate	Votes	Pct	Candidate	Votes	Pct
1990 Primary	Pete Nielsen	1,573	60.1%			
1990 General	Claire Wetherell	3,774	61.0%	Pete Nielsen	2,415	39.0%

District 20 Senate - Owyhee County and part of Elmore County
Year	Candidate	Votes	Pct	Candidate	Votes	Pct	Candidate	Votes	Pct
1996 Primary	Robbi King	2,819	67.2%	Pete Nielsen	1,102	32.8%			
1998 Primary	Robbi King	2,204	57.6%	Pete Nielsen	875	22.9%	Stan Phelps	746	19.5%

District 22 Seat B - Boise and Elmore County
Year	Candidate	Votes	Pct	Candidate	Votes	Pct
2002 Primary	Pete Nielsen	1,574	60.1%	Tish O'Donnell-Bangeman	1,045	39.9%
2002 General	Pete Nielsen	4,124	54.3%	David Phillips	3,476	45.7%
2004 Primary	Pete Nielsen (incumbent)	2,129	100%			
2004 General	Pete Nielsen (incumbent)	6,057	55.0%	Wayne Lasuen	4,947	45.0%
2006 Primary	Pete Nielsen (incumbent)	2,303	100%			
2006 General	Pete Nielsen (incumbent)	4,667	56.2%	Dawn Best	3,638	43.8%
2008 Primary	Pete Nielsen (incumbent)	2,406	100%			
2008 General	Pete Nielsen (incumbent)	7,310	63.9%	Rosemary Ardinger	4,133	36.1%
2010 Primary	Pete Nielsen (incumbent)	3,213	100%			
2010 General	Pete Nielsen (incumbent)	6,550	100%			

District 23 Seat B - Elmore and Owyhee Counties and part of Twin Falls County
Year	Candidate	Votes	Pct	Candidate	Votes	Pct	Candidate	Votes	Pct
2012 Primary	Pete Nielsen (incumbent)	2,225	45.7%	Matthew Bundy	1,498	30.8%	Steve Millington	1,144	23.5%
2012 General	Pete Nielsen (incumbent)	9,037	66.5%	Pam Chiarella	4,556	36.1%			
2014 Primary	Pete Nielsen (incumbent)	2,048	51.0%	Steve Millington	1,965	49.0%			
2014 General	Pete Nielsen (incumbent)	6,212	66.9%	Spike Ericson	2,032	21.9%	C.J. Nemeth	1,044	11.2%
2016 Primary	Megan Blanksma	3,387	71.0%	Pete Nielsen (incumbent)	1,052	22.1%	Justin Freeman	329	6.9%

== Views ==
On February 25, 2016, Nielsen claimed that women who are raped or victims of incest are less likely to become pregnant, due to "trauma". "Being a father of five girls, I've explored this a lot."
