= Ada County Board of Commissioners =

Legislative council in Idaho, United States

Type
- Type: Unicameral

Structure
- Seats: 3
- Political groups: Republican Party (3); Democratic Party (0)
- Length of term: 4 years

The Ada County Board of Commissioners is a county legislative council with jurisdiction over Ada County, Idaho. The board consists of three elected commissioners who serve four-year terms. The board is responsible for managing the county's land usage and public services. The board has executive and policy-making power, in addition to the ability to appoint and remove county department heads.

== Members ==
There are three members of the board of commissioners, elected to serve four-year terms. The governor of Idaho has the ability to fill vacancies on the board.

| District | Commissioner |
|---|---|
| 1 | Ryan Davidson |
| 2 | Rod Beck (chair) |
| 3 | Tom Dayley |
