= Rachel, Lady MacRobert =

Geologist and feminist (1884–1954)

- Lady MacRobert
- Born: 23 March 1884; Worcester, Massachusetts, United States
- Died: 1 September 1954 (aged 70)
- Education: The Cheltenham Ladies' College
- Alma mater: Royal Holloway College; University of Edinburgh
- Spouse: Sir Alexander MacRobert (m. 1911; died 1922)
- Children: 3
- Parents: William Hunter Workman (father); Fanny Bullock (mother)
- Relatives: Alexander Bullock (maternal grandfather); Augustus George Hazard (great grandfather)

Rachel, Lady MacRobert, née Workman (23 March 1884 – 1 September 1954) was a geologist, cattle breeder and an active feminist.

Born in Massachusetts to an influential family, she was educated in England and Scotland. She was elected to Fellowship of the Geological Society of London, one of the first three women admitted. Her scientific studies included petrology and mineralogy in Sweden and her first academic paper was published in 1911. She married Sir Alexander MacRobert, a wealthy self-made Scottish millionaire, and had three sons with him. He was endowed with a knighthood in 1910 and a baronetcy in 1922 but died later that year. Lady MacRobert's sons all pre-deceased her: the eldest in a flying accident in 1938, and the other two died in action during the Second World War serving with the Royal Air Force. On the death of her husband she became a director of the British India Corporation, the conglomerate he had founded.

== Background and early life ==
Born on 23 March 1884, (Note: Haines gives c.1883 for year of birth whereas Rachel's headstone at Douneside reads 23 March 1884, the same year stated by the MacRobert Trust.) in Worcester, Massachusetts, Rachel was the eldest child of Fanny Bullock Workman and her husband William Hunter Workman; the couple also had a son, Siegfried, born in 1889. Fanny and William were well educated and from prominent, wealthy New England families. Fanny received a large inheritance when her father, Alexander, (Note: Pauly describes Bullock as one of the wealthiest persons in Massachusetts following receipt of the dowry from his wife, Elvira Hazard, the daughter of Augustus George Hazard, the gunpowder manufacturer.) died in 1882 and the family fortune was further boosted by a significant bequest from William's father in 1885. The family moved to Dresden when Rachel was five years old in 1889 claiming it would be beneficial to William's "debilitating" health issues. Following the move, he made a prompt return to good health and the couple escalated their interests in travelling and exploring the world. Rachel and her brother were left in Dresden to be cared for by nurses during their parents' frequent trips away. Siegfried died on 26 June 1893 after contracting pneumonia. Fanny's preference for travelling over the responsibilities of motherhood intensified a few months after the funeral and Rachel was despatched to England to be educated at The Cheltenham Ladies' College.

After Cheltenham, Rachel attended Royal Holloway College, an institution founded to provide a university education for women. In 1911 she graduated with a second class Honours degree in geology having spent a year, 1907 until 1908, undertaking a special study of the subject at the University of Edinburgh. Rachel remained in contact with her parents and while returning to England from a trip to India with them in 1909 she met Sir Alexander MacRobert. Commonly referred to as Mac, he was born in Aberdeen to working class parents. He left school when he was twelve but continued his education by attending evening classes. Thirty years older than Rachel, he was born in 1854; when they met he was a widower who had already made a significant fortune building up woollen mills in Cawnpore, or Kanpur as it is now known, where he had worked since early 1884. MacRobert received a knighthood in the New Year's Honours list in 1910 by which time the pair had an established relationship; Rachel refused to attend the ceremony with him at Buckingham Palace declaring: "I will bow to no man."

== Marriage and family ==
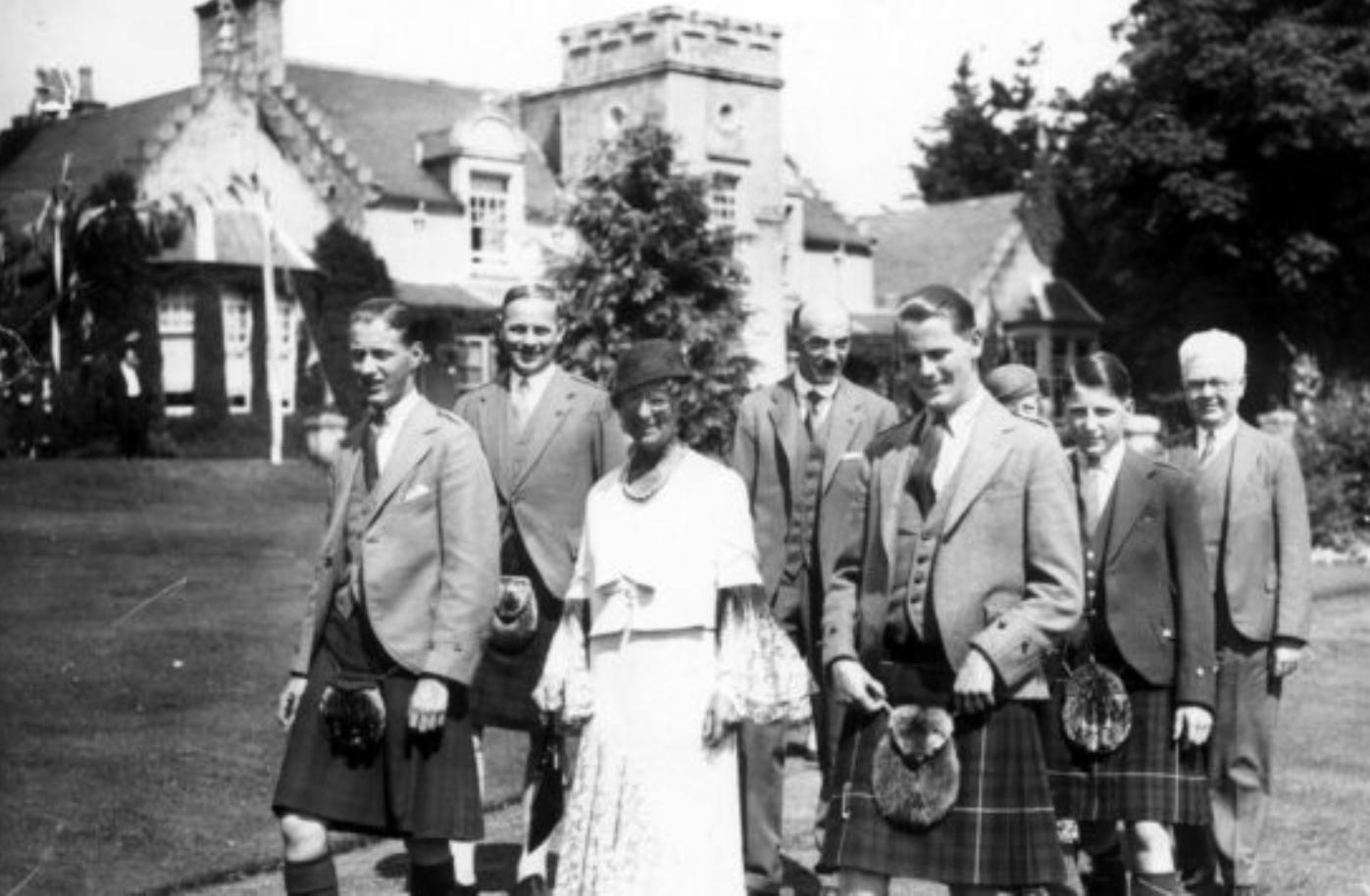
From left: Roderick (born 1915), Lady MacRobert, Alasdair (born 1912) and Iain (youngest, born 1917)

Rachel and MacRobert married on 7 July 1911 at a Quaker Meeting House in York. Neither of Rachel's parents attended the ceremony. (Note: Pauly infers the marriage was in 1912; the ceremony was reported in the New York Times in 1911.) Marriage did not prevent her continuing her studies as she attended the Imperial College in London. While there she undertook research into petrology and mineralogy in Scotland and Sweden, publishing papers on the subject in 1911. She further enhanced her education by attending the Christiania Mineralogisk Institutet, undertaking a post-graduate research course. Her husband devoted most of his time continuing to build his conglomerate in India but eventually Rachel would not live there and referred to it as "that nasty land". While she was in India she continued her geological research at the Kolar Gold Fields. She soon predominantly divided her time between her studies, European travel and managing the estate at Tarland in Aberdeenshire, which Sir Alexander had acquired in 1905 to complement the small farm he bought nearby in 1888. Rachel did reluctantly travel to India to attend ceremonial events like the Delhi Durbar in mid-December 1911.

The couple had three children, all boys: Alasdair, the eldest was born on 11 July 1912; Roderic on 8 May 1915; and the youngest, Iain, on 19 April 1917. The birth of the children did not curtail Sir Alexander's commitment and time spent in India resulting in Rachel being left to care for the children alone. Despite this, she managed to continue her scientific investigations undertaking research at the Eildon Hills in the Scottish borders which was published in 1914.

Rachel's mother was a strong proponent of women's rights and the suffragette movement, an advocacy Rachel shared. Invitations to garden parties in support of the National Union of Women Workers, or the National Council of Women of Great Britain as it is now known, were readily accepted and Rachel hosted luncheon parties for suffragette coordinators. When suffragettes were involved in violent protests in Aberdeen during 1913 against the conditions imposed on women Rachel justified actions like explosives being thrown by stating: "Girls have no sort of life under present social conditions and the wickedness of men at large".

== Middle years ==
Sir Alexander was raised to a baronet at the beginning of 1922, choosing to be named Sir Alexander MacRobert of Cawnpore and Cromar of the County of Aberdeen. He returned to Scotland in April that year but was in poor health; he had a fatal heart attack on 22 June 1922 at Douneside. (Note: It was when the baronetcy was awarded that Sir Alexander changed the spelling of McRobert to MacRobert.) Rachel was left a widow, albeit a rich one, with three boys aged five, seven and ten. Legal difficulties arose over the settlement of Sir Alexander's will due to unrest in India combined with a lengthy acrimonious disagreement with tax inspectors in the UK. His British assets after the payment of death duties amounted to £264,000, the equivalent of over £13.7 million as of 2016. By 1920 Sir Alexander had built up a portfolio of six companies; he had amalgamated these to form the British India Corporation. After his death Rachel assumed the role of director, a position she held until her eldest son, Alasdair, became chairman in 1937. The three boys did not enjoy robust health; this led to Rachel founding a herd of Friesian dairy cattle at Douneside to produce better quality milk for them.

== Additional contributions to geology ==
During her academic career Rachel took a particular interest in glacial geomorphology and petrology. She studied the occurrence of calcite in the igneous rocks on the Alno Island of southern Norway, and also studied the petrography of Eildon Hill, Scotland. Soon after her time at Imperial College, Rachel published her first paper in 1911, "Calcite as a Primary Constituent of Igneous Rock". Active within the geology research community, Rachel attended the International Geological Congress in 1910 and 1913. At her attendance in 1913 at the Annual General Meeting of the Royal Geological Society an attempt was made to eject her; it did not succeed. As one of the many women to make great academic and social strides in the field of geology, Rachel played a key role in the formal integration of women as Fellows of the Geological Society of London in 1919. In 1938 she was elected as a life fellow of the Royal Society of Arts.

== MacRobert Trust ==
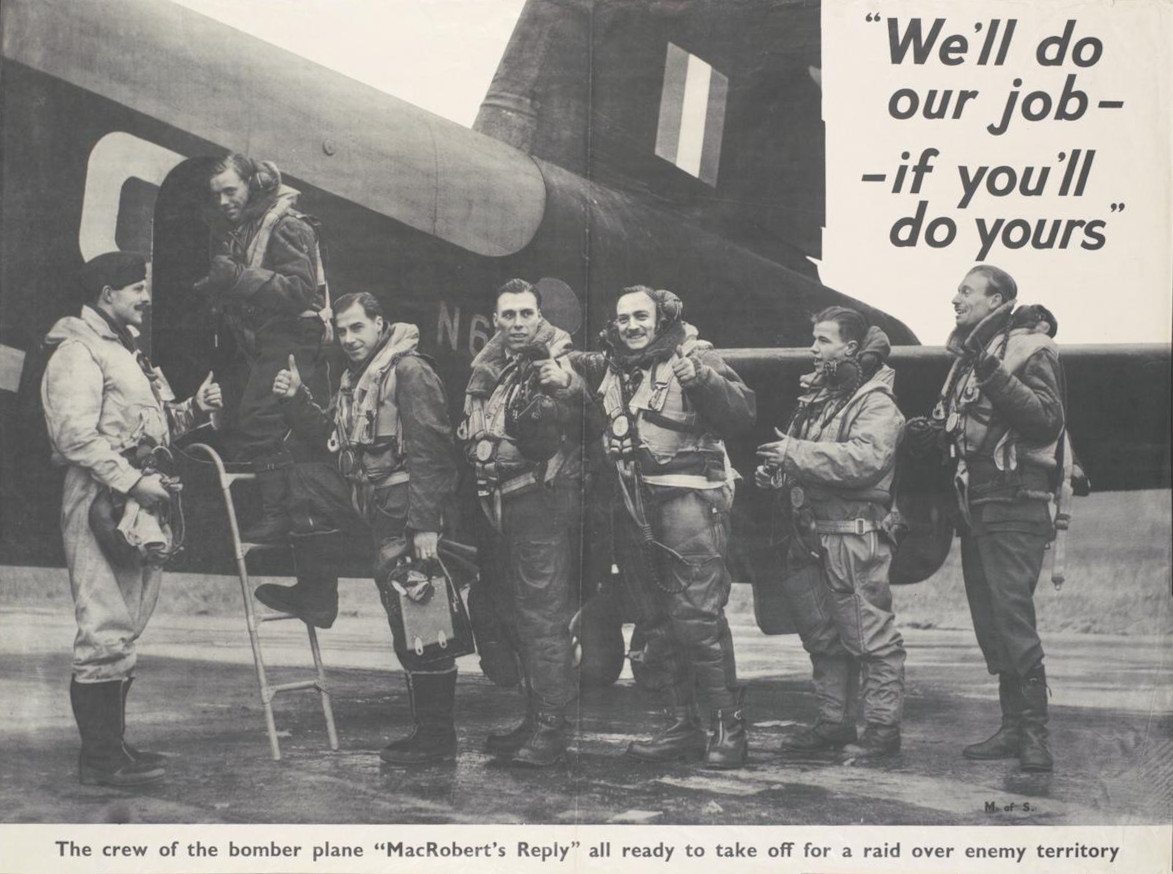
Propaganda poster showing crew embarking on a Short Stirling bomber "MacRobert's Reply" : an aircraft sponsored by Lady MacRobert in memory of her three sons killed in RAF service.

To commemorate her sons, Rachel paid for a Short Stirling bomber named "MacRobert's Reply", and four Hawker Hurricanes.

In 1943 she created the MacRobert Trust, a charity that continues to support the RAF among other institutions. It created the MacRobert Award for engineering, today awarded by the Royal Academy of Engineering.
