= Trent Clark (politician) =

American politician (born 1961)

Idaho Republican Party
- Preceded by: Ron McMurray
- Succeeded by: John Sandy

Personal details
- Born: July 12, 1961 (age 64) Jackson Hole, Wyoming
- Party: Republican
- Spouse: Rebecca
- Children: 3

Trent Clark is a former chair of the Idaho Republican Party and is Public and Government Affairs Director for Bayer in the Inter-mountain West of the United States.

== Personal life and education ==
Clark is a graduate of Ricks College, and finished his undergraduate at Brigham Young University in political science and botany. He has since done graduate work at the Harvard School of Public Health and at La Selva Biological Station in Costa Rica.

Clark resides with his wife, Rebecca, in Soda Springs, Idaho. They are parents to three daughters and one son.

== Career ==
Clark was appointed by President George H. W. Bush as Director of Idaho’s Farm Service Agency, where he administered the USDA farm income support and conservation programs from July 1991 – January 1993. He served as the chair of the Idaho Rural Partnership and was the chair of Idaho Association of Commerce and Industry in 2008.

Clark earlier worked as Chief Environmental Economist for the Joint Economic Committee of Congress and personal staff to Steve Symms of the Senate Committee on Environment and Public Works.

Since 2014, he is Director of Public and Government Affairs for Bayer.

== Political career ==
Clark was part of Mike Crapo grassroots election team for Caribou County in 2016. He was Caribou County Chair for Mike Simpson in 2014 and 2016 reelections.

Clark served as a Ted Cruz delegate for Idaho's 2nd congressional district at the 2016 Republican National Convention.

Clark was chairman of the credentials committee for Idaho Republican Party's 2016 State Convention. He is a recipient of the Eisenhower Commission for Lifetime Service to the Republican Party.

== Idaho Republican Party Chair ==
Clark was first elected as chair in 1998 and won reelection in 2000. He did not run for reelection has chair in 2002. He had Cheryl Miller (1999-2000), Jason Lehosit (2000-2001) his Executive Directors. Idaho Republican Party had the largest percentage of women in the delegation to 2000 Republican National Convention.

Party political offices
Preceded by Ron McMurray	Chair of the Idaho Republican Party; 1998 - June 2002	Succeeded by John Sandy
