= Slingsby Swallow =

British single-seat glider, 1957

T.45 Swallow
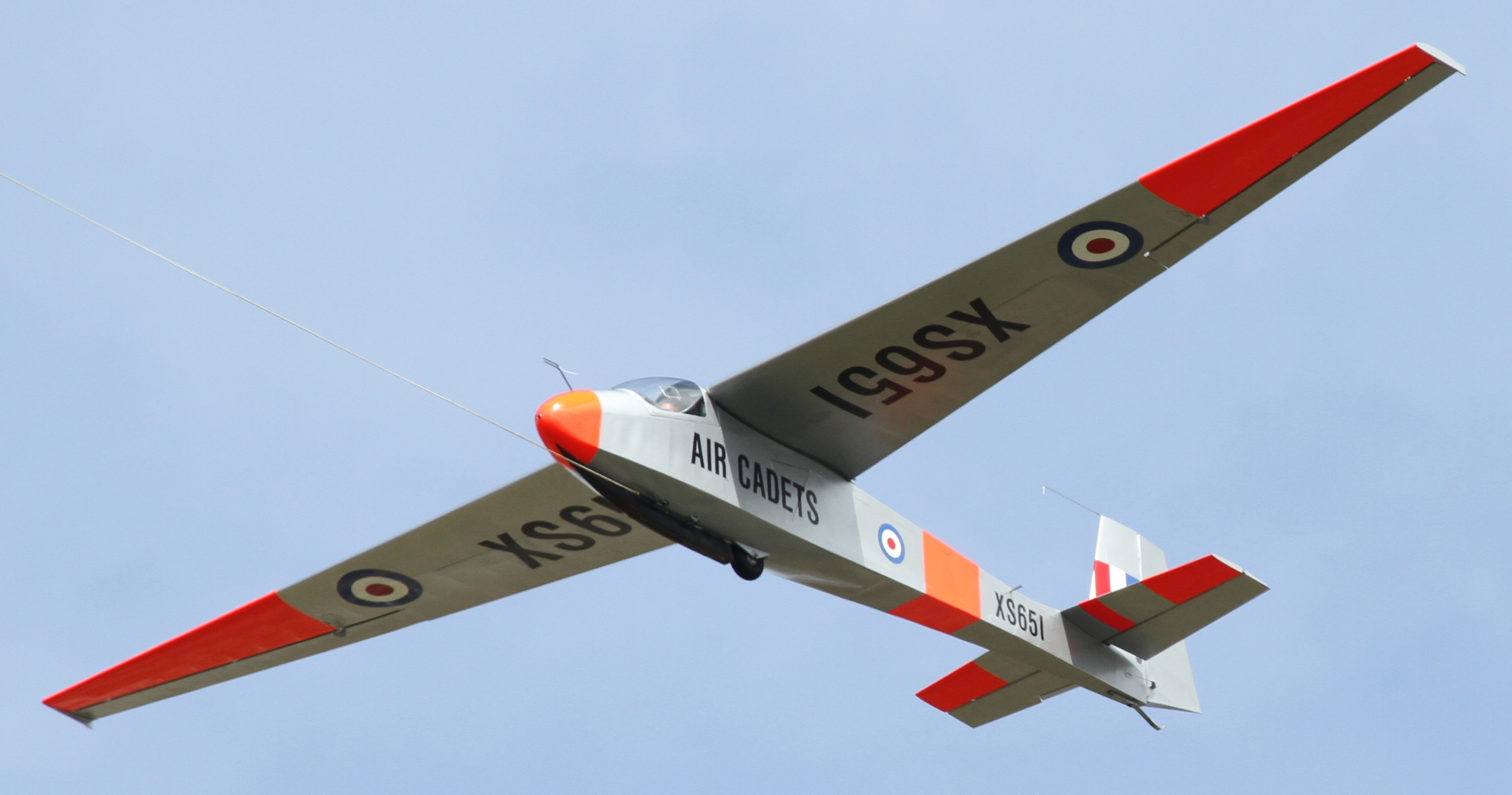

General information
- Type: Intermediate sailplane
- National origin: United Kingdom
- Manufacturer: Slingsby Sailplanes Ltd.
- Number built: c.117

History
- First flight: 11 October 1957

The Slingsby Type 45 Swallow was designed as a club sailplane of reasonable performance and price. One of the most successful of Slingsby's gliders in sales terms, over 100 had been built when production was ended by a 1968 factory fire.

== Design and development ==
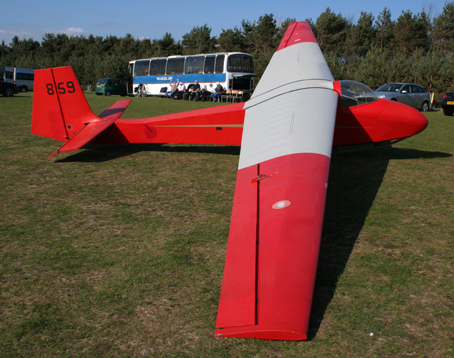
Slingsby Swallow operated by the Borders Gliding Club, from above

The Slingsby Swallow was a wooden-framed aircraft, covered in a mixture of plywood and fabric. Its high mounted, cantilever, straight-tapered and square-tipped wing had 3.3^{o} dihedral. It was Gaboon plywood-skinned and built around a single spruce spar, with a leading-edge torsion box. Its unbalanced ailerons were fabric covered; there were no flaps but dive brakes could be extended in pairs above and below the wings. The prototype had a 12 m span wing, but all production aircraft had their performance enhanced by an extension to 13.05 m.

The forward fuselage was a plywood semi-monocoque, with the perspex enclosed cockpit immediately ahead of the wing. The strong curvature of the single piece canopy in front of the pilot was later reduced, in Mk.2 aircraft, by extending it forwards. In both versions, access was by removal of the canopy and a surrounding fuselage fairing. The whole fuselage was flat sided, but at the rear fabric covering was used. Fixed tail surfaces were plywood skinned and control surfaces fabric covered. Fin and rudder were noticeably straight edged, the unbalanced rudder extending down to the keel. The slightly tapered tailplane was mounted on top of the fuselage and placed far enough forward that the rudder hinge was behind the elevator trailing edge, so that no cutout for rudder movement was needed. The Swallow used a conventional glider undercarriage, a combination of a rubber sprung skid from nose to below the wing leading edge, plus a fixed, unsprung monowheel below mid wing and a small skid at the rear.

== Operational history ==
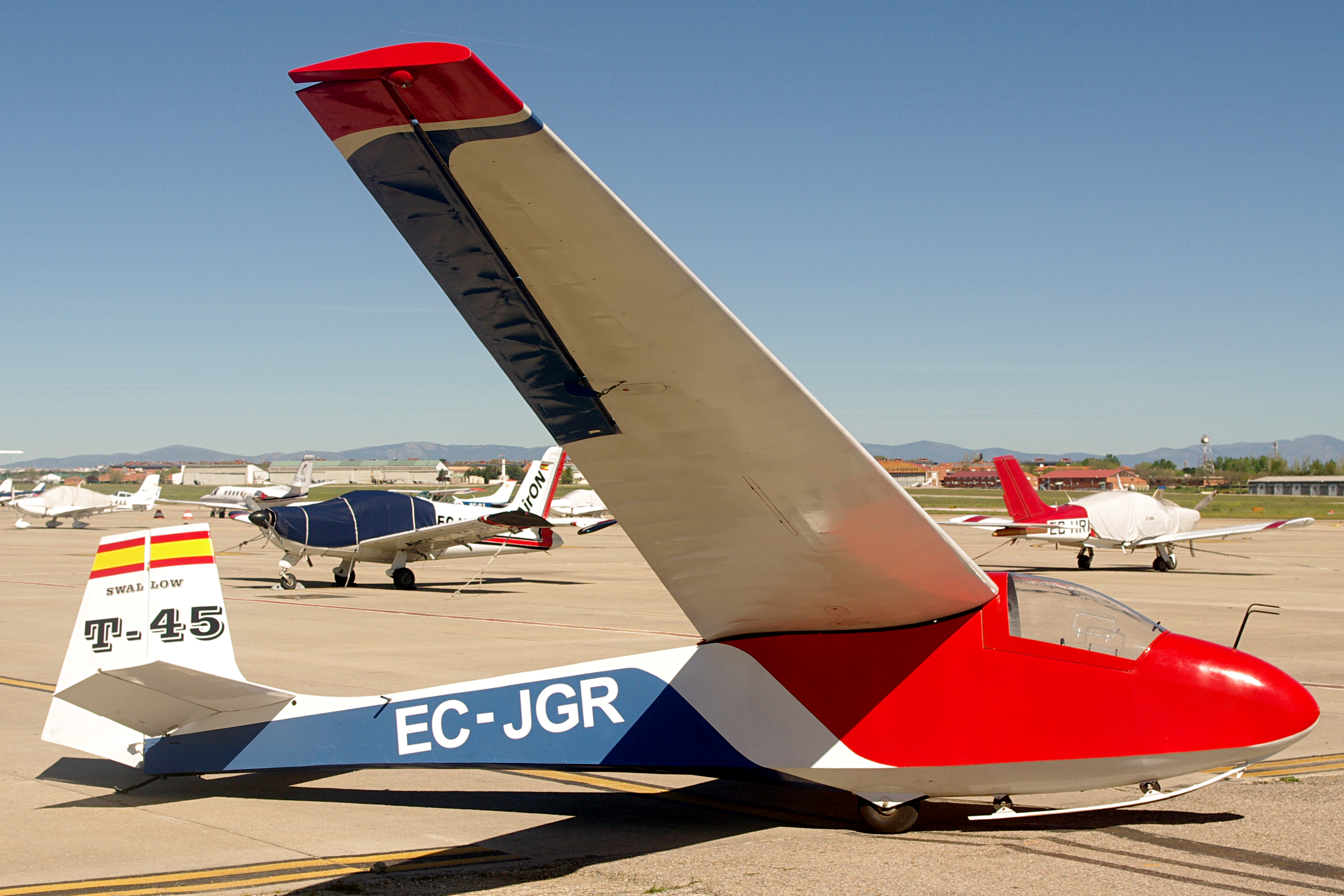
Spanish Swallow showing off underside of wing

The Swallow flew for the first time on 11 October 1957 and it remained in production for 11 years. About 115-120 Swallows were completed, though two were destroyed at the factory in a fire. Part of the uncertainty lies with kits issued by Slingsby for construction abroad. The short-span first prototype was later rebuilt as the Reussner Swift. The RAF used five Swallows, known as Swallow T.X. Mk.1, in its Air Training Corps. Approximately nine Swallows were used by branches of the Royal Air Force Gliding and Soaring Association at airfields across the world, and the equivalent Royal Navy association had four. 25 were sold in Spain, nine in Pakistan and four in Burma. Most of the rest flew with clubs in the UK, though a few went to Commonwealth countries and the USA.

== Specifications ==
Data from Taylor 1966, p. 401The World's Sailplanes:Die Segelflugzeuge der Welt:Les Planeurs du Monde Volume II, The World's Sailplanes:Die Segelflugzeuge der Welt:Les Planeurs du Monde

General characteristics

- Crew: 1
- Length: 23 ft 1 in (7.04 m)
- Wingspan: 42 ft 10 in (13.05 m)
- Height: 5 ft 2 in (1.58 m)
- Wing area: 145.9 sq ft (13.55 m^{2})
- Airfoil: NACA 63_{3}-618 at root, NACA 4412 (mod.) at tip
- Empty weight: 425 lb (193 kg) (equipped)
- Max takeoff weight: 701 lb (318 kg)

Performance

- Stall speed: 33 kn (39 mph, 62 km/h)
- Never exceed speed: 123 kn (141 mph, 227 km/h)
- Rough air speed max: 75 kn (139 km/h; 86 mph)
- Aerotow speed max: 75 kn (139 km/h; 86 mph)
- Winch launch speed max: 70 kn (130 km/h; 81 mph)
- Terminal velocity: with full airbrakes 118 kn (219 km/h; 136 mph)
- g limits: +5 -2.5 at 61 kn (113 km/h; 70 mph)
- Maximum glide ratio: 26:1 at 43 kn (80 km/h; 49 mph) and 628 lb (285 kg) AUW
- Rate of sink: 140 ft/min (0.7 m/s) minimum, at 36 kn (67 km/h; 41 mph) and 628 lb (285 kg) AUW
- Wing loading: 4.8 lb/sq ft (23.4 kg/m^{2})

== See also ==
Related lists

- List of gliders

== In popular culture ==
A balsa wood model of the Swallow was featured in James May's Toy Stories season 1 Christmas special called "Flight Club," which aired on 23 December 2012 on BBC HD.
