= Sir Alexander MacRobert, 1st Baronet =

MacRobert with Georgina, his first wife, in 1886

Sir Alexander MacRobert, 1st Baronet (21 May 1854 – 22 June 1922) was a self-made millionaire from Aberdeen, Scotland. He came from a working-class background and left school when he was twelve to start his working life sweeping floors in Stoneywood Paper Mill; his education was continued by attending evening classes and he gained several qualifications as his early career progressed. At the beginning of 1884 MacRobert travelled to India to take up employment in a woollen mill in Cawnpore, or Kanpur as it is now known. By 1920 he had built up a portfolio of companies enabling him to found the British India Corporation. He was raised to a baronet at the beginning of 1922, choosing to be named Sir Alexander MacRobert of Cawnpore and Cromar of the County of Aberdeen.

== Early life ==
MacRobert was born in Aberdeen on 21 May 1854; his father, John, was a farmer from a Drumblade family who had married Helen, a farmer's daughter from Banchory-Devenick. He left school when he was twelve and, like many other Aberdeen youngsters of the same age at that time, was employed at Stoneywood Paper Mill, initially sweeping floors. Evening classes provided the opportunity to continue his education and he studied a wide variety of subjects. He went on to gain qualifications at the Aberdeen Mechanics' Institute in seventeen disciplines including music theory, biology, history and psychology. Later he lectured part-time at the institute in experimental physics. Always seeking to better himself, he also became interested in chemistry, becoming so proficient in the subject that he soon gave lectures on it at Robert Gordon's College. In the meantime, his position at the paper mill had elevated to office work; shortly he gained more responsibility after being promoted to a different section of the Stoneywood conglomerate but he still returned to undertake audits at the mill every three months.

During 1880 MacRobert undertook a trip to New Brunswick, Canada, to visit his parents and siblings – he had six sisters and a younger brother – who had emigrated and successfully become established as "pioneer farmers of the west." He took another unpaid leave of absence in 1881 to study compound pendulums at the South Kensington Museum.

== First marriage and India ==
On 31 December 1883 MacRobert married Georgina Porter, a factory worker who went on to work in a laundry. At the time of their marriage she lived in Aberdeen with her mother, brother and two sisters. Within a few days of their marriage MacRobert travelled to India to start employment as a chemist with the Muir Mill in Cawnpore, or Kanpur as it is now known; Georgina remained in Aberdeen and did not travel to India until November 1885. When MacRobert arrived in India he was informed that the position had already been taken; the directors also managed the ailing Cawnpore Woollen Mill and, regretful that MacRobert had a wasted trip, offered him alternative employment as manager there instead, which he accepted. The mill was on the brink of bankruptcy and was very sparsely equipped. MacRobert quickly changed the mill's fortunes by hard work coupled with his general knowledge of manufacturing. Three years after he had taken up his position, the mill had been transformed from an unprofitable enterprise with a small staff to a lucrative manufacturing company with diverse interests and over 2,000 employees. He purchased shares in the mill when they were offered at a very low rate. Gradually MacRobert began to purchase mills, adding the New Egerton Mill at Dhariwal and Elgin Mills to the one at Cawnpore.

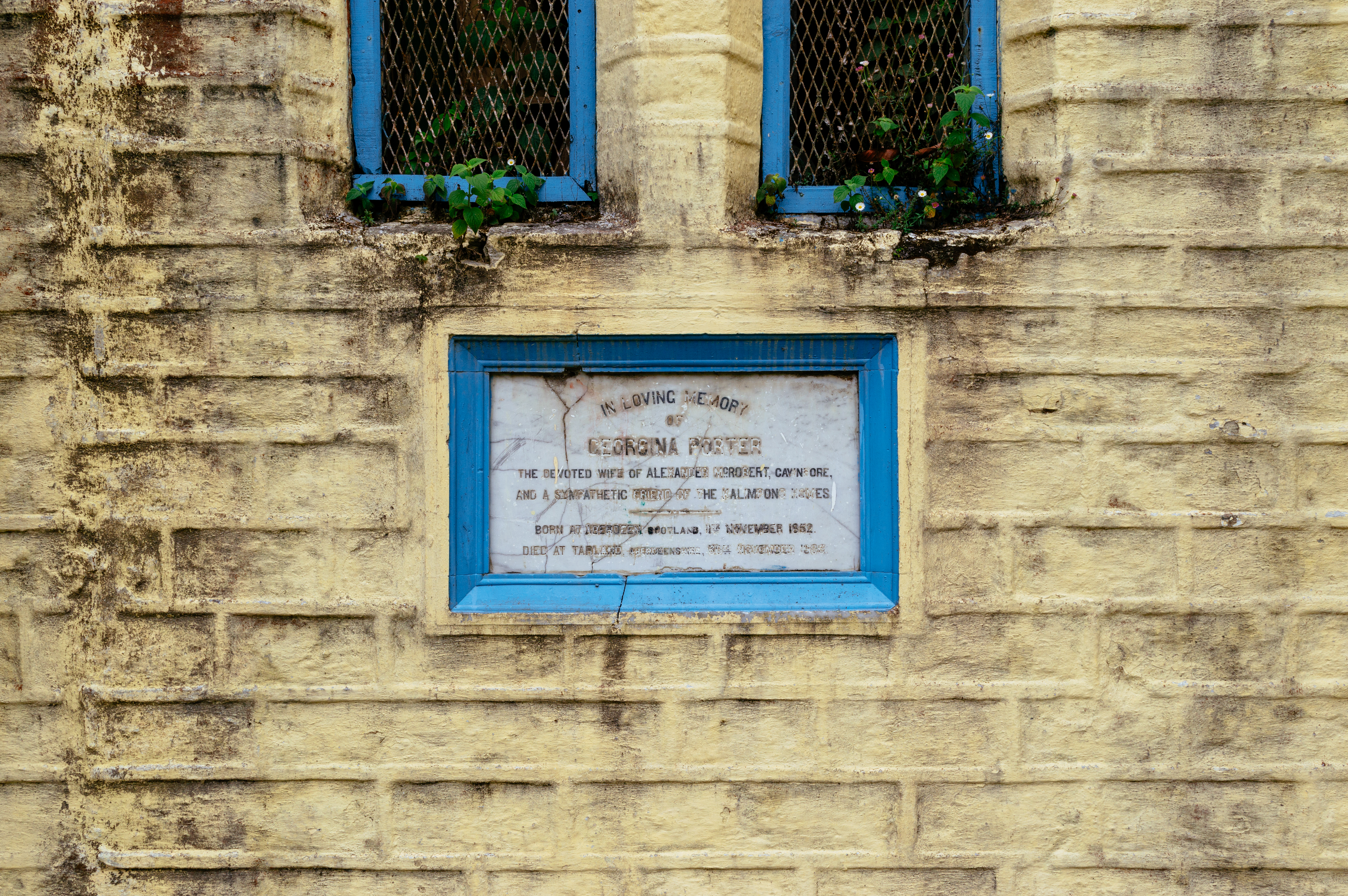
Commemorative Plaque dedicated to Georgina Porter in Dr Graham's Home in Kalimpong

MacRobert was left a widower when his wife died of cancer aged 53 on 30 November 1905. The couple had no children. Her death led to MacRobert, who by then was wealthy with a high status and influence, making a donation of £25,000 in 1906 to initiate research into the cause, prevention and cure for the disease to be undertaken in the Faculty of Medicine at Aberdeen University. Named the Georgina McRobert Fellowship, it was continued at the university until at least the last decade of the twentieth century. Over the following years, MacRobert donated more funds to the fellowship. He also commemorated her by establishing a community hospital in Cawnpore. James Meston, a fellow Aberdonian who at the time was serving as the Lieutenant-Governor of the United Provinces of Agra and Oudh, laid the foundation stone in 1916; the hospital opened in 1920 by Sir Spencer Harcourt Butler, who referred to MacRobert as "The King of Cawnpore". The mill and the surrounding area in Cawnpore is called McRobertganj.

== Later life ==
On a voyage back to Scotland from India in 1909, MacRobert met Rachel Workman, the eldest child of Fanny Bullock Workman and her husband William Hunter Workman, who were from prominent, wealthy New England families. Rachel and MacRobert were married on 7 July 1911 at a Quakers Meeting House in York. The couple had three children, all boys: Alasdair, the eldest was born on 11 July 1912; Roderic on 8 May 1915; and the youngest, Iain, on 19 April 1917. Rachel did not like India and refused to live in the country although MacRobert devoted most of his time to continuing to build his conglomerate there; she referred to it as "that nasty land".

MacRobert received a knighthood in the New Year's Honours list in 1910. By 1920 he had built up a portfolio of six companies; he amalgamated these to form the British India Corporation. He was raised to a baronet at the beginning of 1922, choosing to be named Sir Alexander MacRobert of Cawnpore and Cromar of the County of Aberdeen. It was at this time that he altered the spelling of his surname from McRobert to MacRobert.

== Death and legacy ==
He returned to Scotland in April 1922 but was in poor health; he had a fatal heart attack on 22 June 1922 at Douneside. Georgina, his first wife, had been buried in Allenvale Cemetery, Aberdeen and he was interred beside her. His British assets after the payment of death duties amounted to £264,000, the equivalent of over £13.7 million as of 2016. The inheritance went to Alasdair, his eldest son, who became the second of the MacRobert baronets, but he died in an aviation accident in 1938. A similar fate befell the two younger sons as both died in action in 1941 while serving as pilots in the Royal Air Force. The legacy was eventually bequeathed by Lady MacRobert to the MacRobert Trust, a charity with continuing connections with the military, the countryside and farming, who make charitable grants and operate the former family estate including Douneside House.

Writing in 2015 modern day historian Veronica Strong-Boag described MacRobert as an "Aberdeen poor boy made good" and a "Scottish millionaire"; the Geological Society of London also refer to him as a "self-made millionaire". The British India Corporation was nationalised in 1981 but two of MacRobert's original woollen mills, those at Kanpur and Dhariwal, remained operational during the 21st century.

Baronetage of the United Kingdom
New creation	Baronet (of Douneside); 1922	Succeeded by Alasdair MacRobert
