= Greg Ferch =

American politician

Member of the Idaho House of Representatives from the 21st District, seat B
- In office December 1, 2020 – December 1, 2022
- Preceded by: Megan Kiska
- Succeeded by: John Vander Woude (redistricting)

Personal details
- Party: Republican
- Spouse: Angela
- Education: University of North Dakota; Northwestern College of Chiropractic

Gregory Ferch is an American chiropractor and politician who served as a member of the Idaho House of Representatives from Idaho's 21st district, Seat B.

== Early life ==
Ferch was born in Orange, California, but was raised in the small rural farming town of Kenmare, North Dakota.

Ferch joined the United States Army as a medic while a senior in high school. He attained the rank of Staff Sergeant in six years and left the army after eleven years of service. He was in chiropractic school when his unit was activated during Operation Desert Storm in 1991.

== Education ==
Ferch graduated from the University of North Dakota (UND) in 1989 with a degree in human biology. While at UND he also studied chemistry, business and was a teaching assistant in anatomy cadaver labs for two years. In 1993, he graduated from Northwestern College of Chiropractic in Bloomington, Minnesota, with Doctor of Chiropractic degree.

== Chiropracting career ==
Ferch moved to Boise, Idaho, in April 1994 after purchasing his current chiropractic practice. He has been a small businessman, employer and real estate investor for over twenty-six years.

== Elections ==
Ferch defeated Brenda Palmer and Eli Hodson with 49.3% of the vote. Ferch defeated Libertarian nominee Lisa Adams with 71.5% of the vote.

== Personal life ==
Ferch met his wife, Angela, in 1987 while they were both serving in the United States Army. They were married in 2001 at Broadway Avenue Baptist Church in Boise.
