= 2024 Idaho House of Representatives election =

- November 5, 2024

All 70 seats in the Idaho House of Representatives 36 seats needed for a majority
	Majority party	Minority party
Leader	Mike Moyle	Ilana Rubel
Party	Republican	Democratic
Leader since	December 1, 2022	December 10, 2019
Leader's seat	10th	18th
Seats before	59	11
Seats after	61	9
Seat change	▲2	▼2
Popular vote	1,151,396	456,398
Percentage	71.11%	28.19%
Swing	▼5.16%	▲5.27%
- Results: Republican gain Republican hold Democratic hold
Speaker of the House before election
Mike Moyle
Republican
Elected Speaker of the House
Mike Moyle
Republican

The 2024 Idaho House of Representatives election was held on November 5, 2024, alongside the 2024 United States elections. For the first time in thirty years, the Idaho Democratic Party ran candidates in each legislative district on the ballot.

== Partisan Background ==
In the 2020 Presidential Election, Republican Donald Trump won the most votes in 31 of Idaho's legislative districts, and Democrat Joe Biden won the most votes in 4 districts. Going into the 2024 Idaho House of Representatives elections, Democrats represented one of the two seats in 3 districts where Trump won the most votes in 2020: District 15 in Suburban Ada County ( Trump + 5%); Blaine County-based District 26 ( Trump + 0.05%); and Pocatello-based District 29 ( Trump + 10%).

Biden 50–60% 60–70% / Trump 40–50% 50–60% 60–70% 70–80% 80–90%

== Retirements ==
=== Democrats ===
1. District 19A: Lauren Necochea retired.

=== Republicans ===
1. District 1B: Sage Dixon, after announcing that he would not run for re-election, resigned on September 1, 2024, to take a position at the Idaho Department of Health and Welfare.
2. District 7A: Mike Kingsley retired.
3. District 11B: Chris Allgood retired.

== Incumbents defeated ==
=== In primary election ===
Ten incumbent representatives, all Republicans, were defeated in the May 21 primary election.

==== Republicans ====
1. District 8A: Matthew Bundy lost renomination to Rob Beiswenger.
2. District 8B: Megan Blanksma lost renomination to Faye Thompson.
3. District 9A: Jacyn Gallagher lost renomination to John Shirts.
4. District 11A: Julie Yamamoto lost renomination to Kent Marmon.
5. District 13B: Kenny Wroten lost renomination to Steve Tanner.
6. District 23A: Melissa Durrant lost renomination to Chris Bruce.
7. District 23B: Tina Lambert lost renomination to Shawn Dygert.
8. District 24A: Chenele Dixon lost renomination to Clint Hostetler.
9. District 25B: Gregory Lanting lost renomination to David Leavitt.
10. District 30B: Julianne Young lost renomination to Ben Fuhriman.

=== In general election ===
==== Democrats ====
1. District 26A: Democratic incumbent Ned Burns lost reelection to Republican Mike Pohanka.
2. District 29B: Democratic incumbent Nate Roberts lost reelection to Republican Tanya Burgoyne.

== Predictions ==
Source	Ranking	As of
CNalysis	Solid R	May 14, 2024

== Results ==
Summary of the November 5, 2024 Idaho House of Representatives election results
Party	Votes	%	Seats	+/–	%
Republican Party	1,151,396	71.11%	61	+2	87.14%
Democratic Party	456,398	28.19%	9	-2	12.86%
Independent	7,725	0.48%	0	–	0%
Constitution Party	2,524	0.16%	0	–	0%
Libertarian Party	1,056	0.06%	0	–	0%
Total	1,619,099	100.00%	70	–	

== Closest races ==
Seats where the margin of victory was under 10%:

- District 15
1. Seat A, 1%
2. Seat B, 7.2%
- District 26
1. Seat A, 2.4% gain
2. Seat B, 3%
- District 29
1. Seat B, 5.2% gain

== Summary of results by House district ==
Italics denote an open seat held by the incumbent party; bold text denotes a gain for a party.

State House District	Seat	Incumbent	Party	Elected Representative	Outcome
1	A	Mark Sauter	Rep	Mark Sauter	Rep Hold
1	B	Sage Dixon	Rep	Cornel Rasor	Rep Hold
2	A	Heather Scott	Rep	Heather Scott	Rep Hold
2	B	Dale Hawkins	Rep	Dale Hawkins	Rep Hold
3	A	Vito Barbieri	Rep	Vito Barbieri	Rep Hold
3	B	Jordan Redman	Rep	Jordan Redman	Rep Hold
4	A	Joe Alfieri	Rep	Joe Alfieri	Rep Hold
4	B	Elaine Price	Rep	Elaine Price	Rep Hold
5	A	Ron Mendive	Rep	Ron Mendive	Rep Hold
5	B	Tony Wisniewski	Rep	Tony Wisniewski	Rep Hold
6	A	Lori McCann	Rep	Lori McCann	Rep Hold
6	B	Brandon Mitchell	Rep	Brandon Mitchell	Rep Hold
7	A	Mike Kingsley	Rep	Kyle Harris	Rep Hold
7	B	Charlie Shepherd	Rep	Charlie Shepherd	Rep Hold
8	A	Matthew Bundy	Rep	Rob Beiswenger	Rep Hold
8	B	Megan Blanksma	Rep	Faye Thompson	Rep Hold
9	A	Jacyn Gallagher	Rep	John C. Shirts	Rep Hold
9	B	Judy Boyle	Rep	Judy Boyle	Rep Hold
10	A	Mike Moyle	Rep	Mike Moyle	Rep Hold
10	B	Bruce D. Skaug	Rep	Bruce D. Skaug	Rep Hold
11	A	Julie Yamamoto	Rep	Kent Marmon	Rep Hold
11	B	Chris Allgood	Rep	Lucas Cayler	Rep Hold
12	A	Jeff Cornilles	Rep	Jeff Cornilles	Rep Hold
12	B	Jaron Crane	Rep	Jaron Crane	Rep Hold
13	A	Brent J. Crane	Rep	Brent J. Crane	Rep Hold
13	B	Kenny Wroten	Rep	Steve Tanner	Rep Hold
14	A	Ted Hill	Rep	Ted Hill	Rep Hold
14	B	Josh Tanner	Rep	Josh Tanner	Rep Hold
15	A	Steve Berch	Dem	Steve Berch	Dem Hold
15	B	Dori Healey	Rep	Dori Healey	Rep Hold
16	A	Sonia Galaviz	Dem	Sonia Galaviz	Dem Hold
16	B	Todd Achilles	Dem	Todd Achilles	Dem Hold
17	A	John L. Gannon	Dem	John L. Gannon	Dem Hold
17	B	Megan Egbert	Dem	Megan Egbert	Dem Hold
18	A	Ilana Rubel	Dem	Ilana Rubel	Dem Hold
18	B	Brooke Green	Dem	Brooke Green	Dem Hold
19	A	Lauren Necochea	Dem	Monica Church	Dem Hold
19	B	Chris Mathias	Dem	Chris Mathias	Dem Hold
20	A	Joe A. Palmer	Rep	Joe A. Palmer	Rep Hold
20	B	James D. Holtzclaw	Rep	James D. Holtzclaw	Rep Hold
21	A	James Petzke	Rep	James Petzke	Rep Hold
21	B	Jeff Ehlers	Rep	Jeff Ehlers	Rep Hold
22	A	John Vander Woude	Rep	John Vander Woude	Rep Hold
22	B	Jason A. Monks	Rep	Jason A. Monks	Rep Hold
23	A	Melissa Durrant	Rep	Chris Bruce	Rep Hold
23	B	Tina Lambert	Rep	Shawn Dygert	Rep Hold
24	A	Chenele Dixon	Rep	Clint Hostetler	Rep Hold
24	B	Steve Miller	Rep	Steve Miller	Rep Hold
25	A	Lance Clow	Rep	Lance Clow	Rep Hold
25	B	Gregory Lanting	Rep	David Leavitt	Rep Hold
26	A	Ned W. Burns	Dem	**Mike Pohanka**	**Rep Gain**
26	B	Jack Nelsen	Rep	Jack Nelsen	Rep Hold
27	A	Douglas T. Pickett	Rep	Douglas T. Pickett	Rep Hold
27	B	Clay Handy	Rep	Clay Handy	Rep Hold
28	A	Richard "Rick" Cheatum	Rep	Richard "Rick" Cheatum	Rep Hold
28	B	Dan Garner	Rep	Dan Garner	Rep Hold
29	A	Dustin W. Manwaring	Rep	Dustin W. Manwaring	Rep Hold
29	B	Nate Roberts	Dem	**Tanya Burgoyne**	**Rep Gain**
30	A	David Cannon	Rep	David Cannon	Rep Hold
30	B	Julianne Young	Rep	Ben Fuhriman	Rep Hold
31	A	Jerald Raymond	Rep	Jerald Raymond	Rep Hold
31	B	Rod Furniss	Rep	Rod Furniss	Rep Hold
32	A	Stephanie Mickelsen	Rep	Stephanie Mickelsen	Rep Hold
32	B	Wendy Horman	Rep	Wendy Horman	Rep Hold
33	A	Barbara Ehardt	Rep	Barbara Ehardt	Rep Hold
33	B	Marco Erickson	Rep	Marco Erickson	Rep Hold
34	A	Jon O. Weber	Rep	Jon O. Weber	Rep Hold
34	B	Britt Raybould	Rep	Britt Raybould	Rep Hold
35	A	Kevin Andrus	Rep	Kevin Andrus	Rep Hold
35	B	Joshua Wheeler	Rep	Joshua Wheeler	Rep Hold

== Detailed Results by House District ==
- Note: Official primary results can be obtained here

=== District 1 ===
Seat A

Idaho Legislative District 1 House Seat A Republican Primary Election, 2024
Party	Candidate	Votes	%
Republican	Mark Sauter (incumbent)	7,622	49.88
Republican	Jane Sauter	4,828	31.60
Republican	Spencer Hutchings	2,830	18.52
Total votes		15,280	100.0

Idaho Legislative District 1 House Seat A Democratic Primary Election, 2024
Party	Candidate	Votes	%
Democratic	Karen Matthee	1,048	100.0
Total votes		1,048	100.0

Idaho Legislative District 1 House Seat A General Election, 2024
Party	Candidate	Votes	%
Republican	Mark Sauter (incumbent)	24,265	77.5%
Democratic	Karen Matthee	7,028	22.5%
Total votes		31,293	100%

Seat B

Idaho Legislative District 1 House Seat B Republican Primary Election, 2024
Party	Candidate	Votes	%
Republican	Cornel Rasor	7,623	51.98
Republican	Chuck Lowman	7,042	48.02
Total votes		14,665	100.0

Idaho Legislative District 1 House Seat B Democratic Primary Election, 2024
Party	Candidate	Votes	%
Democratic	Kathryn Larson	987	91.90
Democratic	Bob Vickaryous	87	8.10
Total votes		1,074	100.0

Idaho Legislative District 1 House Seat B General Election, 2024
Party	Candidate	Votes	%
Republican	Cornel Rasor	22,618	71.1%
Democratic	Kathryn Larson	9,195	28.9%
Total votes		31,813	100%

=== District 2 ===
Seat A

Idaho Legislative District 2 House Seat A Republican Primary Election, 2024
Party	Candidate	Votes	%
Republican	Heather Scott (incumbent)	7,524	100.00
Total votes		7,524	100.0

Idaho Legislative District 2 House Seat A Democratic Primary Election, 2024
Party	Candidate	Votes	%
Democratic	Loree Peery	871	100.00
Total votes		871	100.0

Idaho Legislative District 2 House Seat A General Election, 2024
Party	Candidate	Votes	%
Republican	Heather Scott (incumbent)	23,353	81.1%
Democratic	Loree Peery	5,441	18.9%
Total votes		28,794	100%

Seat B

Idaho Legislative District 2 House Seat B Republican Primary Election, 2024
Party	Candidate	Votes	%
Republican	Dale Hawkins (incumbent)	7,394	100.00
Total votes		7,394	100.0

Idaho Legislative District 2 House Seat A Libertarian Primary Election, 2024
Party	Candidate	Votes	%
Libertarian	Jeniffer Luoma	40	100.00
Total votes		40	100.0

Idaho Legislative District 2 House Seat B General Election, 2024
Party	Candidate	Votes	%
Republican	Dale Hawkins (incumbent)	21,708	76.5%
Libertarian	Jennifer Luoma	1,056	3.7%
Independent	Tami Holdahl	5,594	19.7%
Total votes		28,358	100%

=== District 3 ===
Seat A

Idaho Legislative District 3 House Seat A Republican Primary Election, 2024
Party	Candidate	Votes	%
Republican	Vito Barbieri (incumbent)	8,681	100.0
Total votes		8,681	100.0

Idaho Legislative District 3 House Seat A Democratic Primary Election, 2024
Party	Candidate	Votes	%
Democratic	Dale Broadsword	726	100.0
Total votes		726	100.0

Idaho Legislative District 3 House Seat A General Election, 2024
Party	Candidate	Votes	%
Republican	Vito Barbieri (incumbent)	24,829	79.7%
Democratic	Dale Broadsword	6,336	20.3%
Total votes		31,165	100%

Seat B

Idaho Legislative District 3 House Seat B Republican Primary Election, 2024
Party	Candidate	Votes	%
Republican	Jordan Redman (incumbent)	8,816	100.0
Total votes		8,816	100.0

Idaho Legislative District 3 House Seat B Democratic Primary Election, 2024
Party	Candidate	Votes	%
Democratic	Steve Bruno	725	100.0
Total votes		725	100.0

Idaho Legislative District 3 House Seat B General Election, 2024
Party	Candidate	Votes	%
Republican	Jordan Redman (incumbent)	25,008	80.3%
Democratic	Steve Bruno	6,144	19.7%
Total votes		31,152	100%

=== District 4 ===
Seat A

Idaho Legislative District 4 House Seat A Republican Primary Election, 2024
Party	Candidate	Votes	%
Republican	Joe Alfieri (incumbent)	5,286	100.00
Total votes		5,286	100.0

Idaho Legislative District 4 House Seat A Democratic Primary Election, 2024
Party	Candidate	Votes	%
Democratic	Angela Jean Chandler	1,036	100.00
Total votes		1,036	100.0

Idaho Legislative District 4 House Seat A General Election, 2024
Party	Candidate	Votes	%
Republican	Joe Alfieri (incumbent)	15,492	65.5%
Democratic	Angela Jean Chandler	8,142	34.5%
Total votes		23,634	100%

Seat B

Idaho Legislative District 4 House Seat B Republican Primary Election, 2024
Party	Candidate	Votes	%
Republican	Elaine Price (incumbent)	4,000	60.33
Republican	Dave Raglin	2,630	39.67
Total votes		6,630	100.0

Idaho Legislative District 4 House Seat B Democratic Primary Election, 2024
Party	Candidate	Votes	%
Democratic	Paula Marano	1,059	100.00
Total votes		1,059	100.0

Idaho Legislative District 4 House Seat B General Election, 2024
Party	Candidate	Votes	%
Republican	Elaine Price (incumbent)	15,151	63.7%
Democratic	Paula Marano	8,641	36.3%
Total votes		23,792	100%

=== District 5 ===
Seat A

Idaho Legislative District 5 House Seat A Republican Primary Election, 2024
Party	Candidate	Votes	%
Republican	Ron Mendive (incumbent)	6,757	100.00
Total votes		6,757	100.0

Idaho Legislative District 5 House Seat A Democratic Primary Election, 2024
Party	Candidate	Votes	%
Democratic	Kristy Reed Johnson	591	100.0
Total votes		591	100.0

Idaho Legislative District 5 House Seat A General Election, 2024
Party	Candidate	Votes	%
Republican	Ron Mendive	19,883	73.3%
Democratic	Kristy Reed Johnson	5,100	18.8%
Independent	Robert Nonini	2,131	7.9%
Total votes		27,114	100%

Seat B

Idaho Legislative District 5 House Seat B Republican Primary Election, 2024
Party	Candidate	Votes	%
Republican	Tony Wisniewski (incumbent)	6,722	100.0
Total votes		6,722	100.0

Idaho Legislative District 5 House Seat B Democratic Primary Election, 2024
Party	Candidate	Votes	%
Democratic	Teresa Borrenpohl	584	100.0
Total votes		584	100.0

Idaho Legislative District 5 House Seat B General Election, 2024
Party	Candidate	Votes	%
Republican	Tony Wisniewski (incumbent)	21,154	78.9%
Democratic	Teresa Borrenpohl	5,650	21.1%
Total votes		26,804	100%

=== District 6 ===
Seat A

Idaho Legislative District 6 House Seat A Republican Primary Election, 2024
Party	Candidate	Votes	%
Republican	Lori McCann (incumbent)	2,814	43.63
Republican	Colton Bennett	2,614	40.53
Republican	Dave Dalby	1,022	15.84
Total votes		6,450	100.0

Idaho Legislative District 6 House Seat A Democratic Primary Election, 2024
Party	Candidate	Votes	%
Democratic	Trish Carter-Goodheart	1,069	100.0
Total votes		1,069	100.0

Idaho Legislative District 6 House Seat A General Election, 2024
Party	Candidate	Votes	%
Republican	Lori McCann (incumbent)	17,794	64.8%
Democratic	Trish Carter-Goodheart	9,648	35.2%
Total votes		27,442	100%

Seat B

Idaho Legislative District 6 House Seat B Republican Primary Election, 2024
Party	Candidate	Votes	%
Republican	Brandon Mitchell (incumbent)	5,088	100.0
Total votes		5,088	100.0

Idaho Legislative District 6 House Seat B Democratic Primary Election, 2024
Party	Candidate	Votes	%
Democratic	Kathy Dawes	1,091	100.0
Total votes		1,091	100.0

Idaho Legislative District 6 House Seat B General Election, 2024
Party	Candidate	Votes	%
Republican	Brandon Mitchell (incumbent)	16,157	58.1%
Democratic	Kathy Dawes	11,649	41.9%
Total votes		27,806	100%

=== District 7 ===
Seat A

Idaho Legislative District 7 House Seat A Republican Primary Election, 2024
Party	Candidate	Votes	%
Republican	Kyle Harris	3,730	51.61
Republican	Jim Chmelik	3,497	48.39
Total votes		7,227	100.0

Idaho Legislative District 7 House Seat A Democratic Primary Election, 2024
Party	Candidate	Votes	%
Democratic	Vickie Nostrant	836	100.0
Total votes		836	100.0

Idaho Legislative District 7 House Seat A General Election, 2024
Party	Candidate	Votes	%
Republican	Kyle Harris	19,797	75.4%
Democratic	Vickie Nostrant	6,457	24.6%
Total votes		26,254	100%

Seat B

Idaho Legislative District 7 House Seat B Republican Primary Election, 2024
Party	Candidate	Votes	%
Republican	Charlie Shepherd (incumbent)	4,440	60.33
Republican	Larry Dunn	2,920	39.67
Total votes		7,360	100.0

Idaho Legislative District 7 House Seat B Democratic Primary Election, 2024
Party	Candidate	Votes	%
Democratic	Dustin Hardisty	826	100.0
Total votes		826	100.0

Idaho Legislative District 7 House Seat B General Election, 2024
Party	Candidate	Votes	%
Republican	Charlie Shepherd (incumbent)	20,222	77.2%
Democratic	Dustin Hardisty	5,984	22.8%
Total votes		26,206	100%

=== District 8 ===
Seat A

Idaho Legislative District 8 House Seat A Republican Primary Election, 2024
Party	Candidate	Votes	%
Republican	Rob Beiswenger	4,769	54.11
Republican	Matthew "Matt" Bundy (incumbent)	4,044	45.89
Total votes		8,813	100.0

Idaho Legislative District 8 House Seat A General Election, 2024
Party	Candidate	Votes	%
Republican	Rob Beiswenger	20,049	100%
Total votes		20,049	100%
Republican hold			

Seat B

Idaho Legislative District 8 House Seat B Republican Primary Election, 2024
Party	Candidate	Votes	%
Republican	Faye Thompson	4,361	51.30
Republican	Megan C. Blanksma (incumbent)	4,140	48.70
Total votes		8,771	100.0

Idaho Legislative District 8 House Seat B Democratic Primary Election, 2024
Party	Candidate	Votes	%
Democratic	Jared Dawson	784	100.00
Total votes		784	100.0

Idaho Legislative District 8 House Seat B Constitution Primary Election, 2024
Party	Candidate	Votes	%
Constitution	Tony Ullrich	30	100.00
Total votes		30	100.0

Idaho Legislative District 8 House Seat B General Election, 2024
Party	Candidate	Votes	%
Republican	Faye Thompson	16,546	67.9%
Democratic	Jared Dawson	6,702	27.5%
Constitution	Tony Ullrich	1,111	4.6%
Total votes		24,359	100%

=== District 9 ===
Seat A

Idaho Legislative District 9 House Seat A Republican Primary Election, 2024
Party	Candidate	Votes	%
Republican	John Shirts	5,274	61.84
Republican	Jacyn Gallagher (incumbent)	3,255	38.16
Total votes		8,529	100.0

Idaho Legislative District 9 House Seat A Democratic Primary Election, 2024
Party	Candidate	Votes	%
Democratic	Thomas P Albritton	406	100.00
Total votes		406	100.0

Idaho Legislative District 9 House Seat A General Election, 2024
Party	Candidate	Votes	%
Republican	John Shirts	21,107	82.9%
Democratic	Thomas P Albritton	3,718	15%
Total votes		24,825	100%

Seat B

Idaho Legislative District 9 House Seat B Republican Primary Election, 2024
Party	Candidate	Votes	%
Republican	Judy Boyle (incumbent)	7,172	100.0
Total votes		7,172	100.0

Idaho Legislative District 9 House Seat B Democratic Primary Election, 2024
Party	Candidate	Votes	%
Democratic	Jody Keeler	415	100.0
Total votes		415	100.0

Idaho Legislative District 9 House Seat B General Election, 2024
Party	Candidate	Votes	%
Republican	Judy Boyle (incumbent)	20,004	81.4%
Democratic	Jody Keeler	4,576	18.6%
Total votes		24,580	100%

=== District 10 ===
Seat A

Idaho Legislative District 10 House Seat A Republican Primary Election, 2024
Party	Candidate	Votes	%
Republican	Mike Moyle (incumbent)	4,994	54.35
Republican	Rachel Hazelip	4,195	45.65
Total votes		9,189	100.0

Idaho Legislative District 10 House Seat A Democratic Primary Election, 2024
Party	Candidate	Votes	%
Democratic	Nancy Parker	662	100.0
Total votes		662	100.0

Idaho Legislative District 10 House Seat A General Election, 2024
Party	Candidate	Votes	%
Republican	Mike Moyle (incumbent)	26,674	81.4%
Democratic	Nancy Parker	6,078	18.6%
Total votes		32,752	100%

Seat B

Idaho Legislative District 10 House Seat B Republican Primary Election, 2024
Party	Candidate	Votes	%
Republican	Bruce D. Skaug (incumbent)	7,971	100.0
Total votes		7,971	100.0

Idaho Legislative District 10 House Seat B Democratic Primary Election, 2024
Party	Candidate	Votes	%
Democratic	Shana Tremaine	651	100.0
Total votes		651	100.0

Idaho Legislative District 10 House Seat B General Election, 2024
Party	Candidate	Votes	%
Republican	Bruce D. Skaug (incumbent)	26,521	81.6%
Democratic	Shana Tremaine	5,981	18.4%
Total votes		32,502	100%

=== District 11 ===
Seat A

Idaho Legislative District 11 House Seat A Republican Primary Election, 2024
Party	Candidate	Votes	%
Republican	Kent A. Marmon	1,912	56.79
Republican	Julie Yamamoto (incumbent)	1,455	43.21
Total votes		3,367	100.0

Idaho Legislative District 11 House Seat A Democratic Primary Election, 2024
Party	Candidate	Votes	%
Democratic	Anthony Porto	451	100.0
Total votes		451	100.0

Idaho Legislative District 11 House Seat A General Election, 2024
Party	Candidate	Votes	%
Republican	Kent A. Marmon	10,995	65.9%
Democratic	Anthony Porto	5,684	34.1%
Total votes		16,679	100%

Seat B

Idaho Legislative District 11 House Seat B Republican Primary Election, 2024
Party	Candidate	Votes	%
Republican	Lucas Cayler	1,695	50.58
Republican	Sarah Chaney	1,656	49.42
Total votes		3,351	100.0

Idaho Legislative District 11 House Seat B Democratic Primary Election, 2024
Party	Candidate	Votes	%
Democratic	Marisela Pesina	477	100.0
Total votes		477	100.0

Idaho Legislative District 11 House Seat B General Election, 2024
Party	Candidate	Votes	%
Republican	Lucas Cayler	10,906	65.4%
Democratic	Marisela Pesina	5,780	34.6%
Total votes		16,686	100%

=== District 12 ===
Seat A

Idaho Legislative District 12 House Seat A Republican Primary Election, 2024
Party	Candidate	Votes	%
Republican	Jeff Cornilles (incumbent)	2,662	59.50
Republican	Jarmone Bell	1,812	40.50
Total votes		4,474	100.0

Idaho Legislative District 12 House Seat A General Election, 2024
Party	Candidate	Votes	%
Republican	Jeff Cornilles (incumbent)	17,085	100%
Total votes		17,085	100%
Republican hold			

Seat B

Idaho Legislative District 12 House Seat B Republican Primary Election, 2024
Party	Candidate	Votes	%
Republican	Jaron Crane (incumbent)	3,364	78.16
Republican	John (Jay) Noller	940	21.84
Total votes		4,304	100.0

Seat B

Idaho Legislative District 12 House Seat B Democratic Primary Election, 2024
Party	Candidate	Votes	%
Democratic	Don Benson	586	100.00
Total votes		586	100.00

Idaho Legislative District 12 House Seat B General Election, 2024
Party	Candidate	Votes	%
Republican	Jaron Crane (incumbent)	15,066	71%
Democratic	Don Benson	6,166	29%
Total votes		21,232	100%

=== District 13 ===
Seat A

Idaho Legislative District 13 House Seat A Republican Primary Election, 2024
Party	Candidate	Votes	%
Republican	Brent J. Crane (incumbent)	4,223	100.0
Total votes		4,223	100.0

Idaho Legislative District 13 House Seat A Democratic Primary Election, 2024
Party	Candidate	Votes	%
Democratic	Cliff Hohman	485	100.0
Total votes		485	100.0

Idaho Legislative District 13 House Seat A General Election, 2024
Party	Candidate	Votes	%
Republican	Brent J. Crane (incumbent)	15,206	71.5%
Democratic	Cliff Hohman	6,073	28.5%
Total votes		21,279	100%

Seat B

Idaho Legislative District 13 House Seat B Republican Primary Election, 2024
Party	Candidate	Votes	%
Republican	Steve Tanner	2,205	45.53
Republican	Kenny Wroten (incumbent)	1,752	36.18
Republican	Amy Henry	886	18.29
Total votes		4,843	100.0

Idaho Legislative District 13 House Seat B General Election, 2024
Party	Candidate	Votes	%
Republican	Steve Tanner	17,136	100%
Total votes		17,136	100%
Republican hold			

=== District 14 ===
Seat A

Idaho Legislative District 14 House Seat A Republican Primary Election, 2024
Party	Candidate	Votes	%
Republican	Ted Hill (incumbent)	6,490	100.0
Total votes		6,490	100.0

Idaho Legislative District 14 House Seat A General Election, 2024
Party	Candidate	Votes	%
Republican	Ted Hill (incumbent)	26,769	100%
Total votes		26,769	100%
Republican hold			

Seat B

Idaho Legislative District 14 House Seat B Republican Primary Election, 2024
Party	Candidate	Votes	%
Republican	Josh Tanner (incumbent)	6,719	100.00
Total votes		6,719	100.0

Idaho Legislative District 14 House Seat B Democratic Primary Election, 2024
Party	Candidate	Votes	%
Democratic	Jo Daly	840	100.0
Total votes		840	100.0

Idaho Legislative District 14 House Seat B General Election, 2024
Party	Candidate	Votes	%
Republican	Josh Tanner (incumbent)	25,629	77.5%
Democratic	Jo Daly	7,431	22.5%
Total votes		33,060	100%

=== District 15 ===
Seat A

Idaho Legislative District 15 House Seat A Republican Primary Election, 2024
Party	Candidate	Votes	%
Republican	Annette Tipton	3,050	100.0
Total votes		3,050	100.0

Idaho Legislative District 15 House Seat A Democratic Primary Election, 2024
Party	Candidate	Votes	%
Democratic	Steve Berch (incumbent)	1,804	100.0
Total votes		1,804	100.0

Idaho Legislative District 15 House Seat A General Election, 2024
Party	Candidate	Votes	%
Democratic	Steve Berch (incumbent)	12,449	50.5%
Republican	Annette Tipton	12,222	49.5%
Total votes		24,671	100%

Seat B

Idaho Legislative District 15 House Seat B Republican Primary Election, 2024
Party	Candidate	Votes	%
Republican	Dori Healey (incumbent)	3,086	100.0
Total votes		3,086	100.0

Idaho Legislative District 15 House Seat B Democratic Primary Election, 2024
Party	Candidate	Votes	%
Democratic	Shari Baber	1,194	67.15
Democratic	Ivan Hurlburt	584	32.85
Total votes		1,778	100.0

Idaho Legislative District 15 House Seat B General Election, 2024
Party	Candidate	Votes	%
Republican	Dori Healey (incumbent)	13,098	53.6%
Democratic	Shari Baber	11,318	46.4%
Total votes		24,416	100%

=== District 16 ===
Seat A

Idaho Legislative District 16 House Seat A Republican Primary Election, 2024
Party	Candidate	Votes	%
Republican	Chandler Stewart Hadraba	2,059	100.0
Total votes		2,059	100.0

Idaho Legislative District 16 House Seat A Democratic Primary Election, 2024
Party	Candidate	Votes	%
Democratic	Soñia Galaviz (incumbent)	2,523	100.0
Total votes		2,523	100.0

Idaho Legislative District 16 House Seat A General Election, 2024
Party	Candidate	Votes	%
Democratic	Soñia Galaviz (incumbent)	14,177	61.1%
Republican	Chandler Stewart Hadraba	9,044	38.9%
Total votes		23,221	100%

Seat B

Idaho Legislative District 16 House Seat B Republican Primary Election, 2024
Party	Candidate	Votes	%
Republican	Jackie Davidson	2,189	100.0
Total votes		2,189	100.0

Idaho Legislative District 16 House Seat B Democratic Primary Election, 2024
Party	Candidate	Votes	%
Democratic	Todd Achilles (incumbent)	1,337	46.50
Democratic	Nikson Mattews	813	28.28
Democratic	Jon Chu	636	22.12
Democratic	Wayne Richey	89	3.10
Total votes		2,875	100.0

Idaho Legislative District 16 House Seat B General Election, 2024
Party	Candidate	Votes	%
Democratic	Todd Achilles (incumbent)	13,978	59.8%
Republican	Jackie Davidson	9,401	40.2%
Total votes		23,379	100%

=== District 17 ===
Seat A

Idaho Legislative District 17 House Seat A Democratic Primary Election, 2024
Party	Candidate	Votes	%
Democratic	John Gannon (incumbent)	1,398	100.0
Total votes		1,398	100.0

Idaho Legislative District 17 House Seat A General Election, 2024
Party	Candidate	Votes	%
Democratic	John Gannon (incumbent)	15,320	100%
Total votes		15,320	100%
Democratic hold			

Seat B

Idaho Legislative District 17 House Seat B Republican Primary Election, 2024
Party	Candidate	Votes	%
Republican	Jazz Alexis	2,112	100.0
Total votes		2,112	100.0

Idaho Legislative District 17 House Seat B Democratic Primary Election, 2024
Party	Candidate	Votes	%
Democratic	Megan Egbert (incumbent)	1,356	100.0
Total votes		1,356	100.0

Idaho Legislative District 17 House Seat B General Election, 2024
Party	Candidate	Votes	%
Democratic	Megan Ebert (incumbent)	12,977	56.9%
Republican	Jazz Alexis	9,816	43.1%
Total votes		22,793	100%

=== District 18 ===
Seat A

Idaho Legislative District 18 House Seat A Democratic Primary Election, 2024
Party	Candidate	Votes	%
Democratic	Ilana Rubel (incumbent)	1,562	100.0
Total votes		1,562	100.0

Idaho Legislative District 18 House Seat A General Election, 2024
Party	Candidate	Votes	%
Democratic	Ilana Rubel (incumbent)	17,112	100%
Total votes		17,112	100%
Democratic hold			

Seat B

Idaho Legislative District 18 House Seat B Democratic Primary Election, 2024
Party	Candidate	Votes	%
Democratic	Brooke Green (incumbent)	1,527	100.0
Total votes		1,527	100.0

Idaho Legislative District 18 House Seat B General Election, 2024
Party	Candidate	Votes	%
Democratic	Brooke Green (incumbent)	16,800	100%
Total votes		16,800	100%
Democratic hold			

=== District 19 ===
Seat A

Idaho Legislative District 19 House Seat A Republican Primary Election, 2024
Party	Candidate	Votes	%
Republican	Jim Feederle	2,820	100.0
Total votes		2,820	100.0

Idaho Legislative District 19 House Seat A Democratic Primary Election, 2024
Party	Candidate	Votes	%
Democratic	Monica C. Church	2,236	100.0
Total votes		2,236	100.0

Idaho Legislative District 19 House Seat A General Election, 2024
Party	Candidate	Votes	%
Democratic	Monica C. Church	20,947	65.6%
Republican	Jim Feederle	10,997	34.4%
Total votes		31,944	100%

Seat B

Idaho Legislative District 19 House Seat B Democratic Primary Election, 2024
Party	Candidate	Votes	%
Democratic	Chris Mathias (incumbent)	2,249	64.0
Total votes		2,249	100.0

Idaho Legislative District 19 House Seat B General Election, 2024
Party	Candidate	Votes	%
Democratic	Chris Mathias (incumbent)	22,575	100%
Total votes		22,575	100%
Democratic hold			

=== District 20 ===
Seat A

Idaho Legislative District 20 House Seat A Republican Primary Election, 2024
Party	Candidate	Votes	%
Republican	Joe A. Palmer (incumbent)	4,875	100.00
Total votes		4,875	100.0

Idaho Legislative District 20 House Seat A Democratic Primary Election, 2024
Party	Candidate	Votes	%
Democratic	Isaiah Navarro	962	100.0
Total votes		962	100.0

Idaho Legislative District 20 House Seat A General Election, 2024
Party	Candidate	Votes	%
Republican	Joe A. Palmer (incumbent)	19,216	71%
Democratic	Isaiah Navarro	7,841	29%
Total votes		27,057	100%

Seat B

Idaho Legislative District 20 House Seat B Republican Primary Election, 2024
Party	Candidate	Votes	%
Republican	James Holtzclaw (incumbent)	4,829	100.0
Total votes		4,829	100.0

Idaho Legislative District 20 House Seat B General Election, 2024
Party	Candidate	Votes	%
Republican	James Holtzclaw (incumbent)	20,744	100%
Total votes		20,744	100%
Republican hold			

=== District 21 ===
Seat A

Idaho Legislative District 21 House Seat A Republican Primary Election, 2024
Party	Candidate	Votes	%
Republican	James Petzke (incumbent)	2,969	55.11
Republican	Adam Nelson	1,270	23.58
Republican	Monica McKinley	1,148	21.31
Total votes		5,387	100.0

Idaho Legislative District 21 House Seat A Democratic Primary Election, 2024
Party	Candidate	Votes	%
Democratic	Casey Hess	991	100.0
Total votes		991	100.0

Idaho Legislative District 21 House Seat A General Election, 2024
Party	Candidate	Votes	%
Republican	James Petzke (incumbent)	17,558	68.3%
Democratic	Casey Hess	8,160	31.7%
Total votes		25,718	100%

Seat B

Idaho Legislative District 21 House Seat B Republican Primary Election, 2024
Party	Candidate	Votes	%
Republican	Jeff Ehlers (incumbent)	4,367	100.00
Total votes		4,367	100.0

Idaho Legislative District 21 House Seat B Democratic Primary Election, 2024
Party	Candidate	Votes	%
Democratic	Becky R. McKinstry	999	100.00
Total votes		999	100.0

Idaho Legislative District 21 House Seat B Constitution Primary Election, 2024
Party	Candidate	Votes	%
Constitution	Daniel S. Weston	18	100.00
Total votes		18	100.0

Idaho Legislative District 21 House Seat B General Election, 2024
Party	Candidate	Votes	%
Republican	Jeff Ehlers (incumbent)	16,005	61.7%
Democratic	Becky R. McKinstry	8,504	32.8%
Constitution	Daniel S. Weston	1,413	5.5%
Total votes		25,922	100%

=== District 22 ===
Seat A

Idaho Legislative District 22 House Seat A Republican Primary Election, 2024
Party	Candidate	Votes	%
Republican	John Vander Woude (incumbent)	4,079	100.00
Total votes		4,079	100.0

Idaho Legislative District 22 House Seat A Democratic Primary Election, 2024
Party	Candidate	Votes	%
Democratic	Loren Petty	1,067	100.0
Total votes		1,067	100.0

Idaho Legislative District 22 House Seat A General Election, 2024
Party	Candidate	Votes	%
Republican	John Vander Woude (incumbent)	19,310	65.9%
Democratic	Loren Petty	9,989	34.1%
Total votes		29,299	100%

Seat B

Idaho Legislative District 22 House Seat B Republican Primary Election, 2024
Party	Candidate	Votes	%
Republican	Jason A. Monks (incumbent)	3,341	67.13
Republican	Marisa Stevens Keith	1,636	32.87
Total votes		4,977	100.0

Idaho Legislative District 22 House Seat B Democratic Primary Election, 2024
Party	Candidate	Votes	%
Democratic	Glida Bothwell	1,053	100.0
Total votes		1,053	100.0

Idaho Legislative District 22 House Seat B General Election, 2024
Party	Candidate	Votes	%
Republican	Jason A. Monks (incumbent)	19,548	66.9%
Democratic	Glida Bothwell	9,654	33.1%
Total votes		29,202	100%

=== District 23 ===
Seat A

Idaho Legislative District 23 House Seat A Republican Primary Election, 2024
Party	Candidate	Votes	%
Republican	Chris Bruce	3,288	50.80
Republican	Melissa Durrant (incumbent)	3,185	49.20
Total votes		6,473	100.0

Idaho Legislative District 23 House Seat A Democratic Primary Election, 2024
Party	Candidate	Votes	%
Democratic	Don Harrington	471	100.0
Total votes		471	100.0

Idaho Legislative District 23 House Seat A General Election, 2024
Party	Candidate	Votes	%
Republican	Chris Bruce	19,926	80.1%
Democratic	Don Harrington	4,948	19.9%
Total votes		24,874	100%

Seat B

Idaho Legislative District 23 House Seat B Republican Primary Election, 2024
Party	Candidate	Votes	%
Republican	Shawn R. Dygert	3,325	51.52
Republican	Tina Lambert (incumbent)	3,129	48.48
Total votes		6,454	100.0

Idaho Legislative District 23 House Seat B Democratic Primary Election, 2024
Party	Candidate	Votes	%
Democratic	Julissa Melendez Castellanos	480	100.0
Total votes		480	100.0

Idaho Legislative District 23 House Seat B General Election, 2024
Party	Candidate	Votes	%
Republican	Shawn R. Dygert	20,147	81.1%
Democratic	Julissa Melendez Castellanos	4,692	18.9%
Total votes			

=== District 24 ===
Seat A

Idaho Legislative District 24 House Seat A Republican Primary Election, 2024
Party	Candidate	Votes	%
Republican	Clint Hostetler	5,260	58.69
Republican	Chenele Dixon (incumbent)	3,702	41.31
Total votes		8,962	100.0

Idaho Legislative District 24 House Seat A General Election, 2024
Party	Candidate	Votes	%
Republican	Clint Hostetler	19,146	100%
Total votes		19,146	100%
Republican hold			

Seat B

Idaho Legislative District 24 House Seat B Republican Primary Election, 2024
Party	Candidate	Votes	%
Republican	Steve Miller	4,802	55.77
Republican	Jeff Faulkner	3,809	44.23
Total votes		8,611	100.0

Idaho Legislative District 24 House Seat B General Election, 2024
Party	Candidate	Votes	%
Republican	Steve Miller	19,201	100%
Total votes		19,201	100%
Republican hold			

=== District 25 ===
Seat A

Idaho Legislative District 25 House Seat A Republican Primary Election, 2024
Party	Candidate	Votes	%
Republican	Lance Clow (incumbent)	3,848	100.0
Total votes		3,848	100.0

Idaho Legislative District 25 House Seat A Democratic Primary Election, 2024
Party	Candidate	Votes	%
Democratic	W. Lane Startin	380	100.0
Total votes		380	100.0

Idaho Legislative District 25 House Seat A General Election, 2024
Party	Candidate	Votes	%
Republican	Lance Clow (incumbent)	13,264	72.1%
Democratic	W. Lane Startin	5,128	27.9%
Total votes		18,392	100%

Seat B

Idaho Legislative District 25 House Seat B Republican Primary Election, 2024
Party	Candidate	Votes	%
Republican	David J. Leavitt	2,744	58.31
Republican	Gregory (Greg) Lanting	1,962	41.69
Total votes		4,706	100.0

Idaho Legislative District 25 House Seat B General Election, 2024
Party	Candidate	Votes	%
Republican	David J. Leavitt	13,676	100%
Total votes		13,676	100%
Republican hold			

=== District 26 ===
Seat A

Idaho Legislative District 26 House Seat A Republican Primary Election, 2024
Party	Candidate	Votes	%
Republican	Mike Pohanka	2,348	60.07
Republican	Kally Schiffler	1,561	39.93
Total votes		3,909	100.0

Idaho Legislative District 26 House Seat A Democratic Primary Election, 2024
Party	Candidate	Votes	%
Democratic	Ned Burns	3,177	100.0
Total votes		3,177	100.0

Idaho Legislative District 26 House Seat A General Election, 2024
Party	Candidate	Votes	%
Republican	Mike Pohanka	11,495	51.2%
Democratic	Ned Burns	10,960	48.8%
Total votes		22,455	100%

Seat B

Idaho Legislative District 26 House Seat B Republican Primary Election, 2024
Party	Candidate	Votes	%
Republican	Jack Nelsen (incumbent)	2,049	52.15
Republican	Lyle Johnstone	1,880	47.85
Total votes		3,929	100.0

Idaho Legislative District 26 House Seat B Democratic Primary Election, 2024
Party	Candidate	Votes	%
Democratic	Chris Hansen	2,999	100.0
Total votes		2,999	100.0

Idaho Legislative District 26 House Seat B General Election, 2024
Party	Candidate	Votes	%
Republican	Jack Nelsen (incumbent)	11,497	51.5%
Democratic	Chris Hansen	10,814	48.5%
Total votes		11,497	

=== District 27 ===
Seat A

Idaho Legislative District 27 House Seat A Republican Primary Election, 2024
Party	Candidate	Votes	%
Republican	Douglas Pickett (incumbent)	5,830	100.0
Total votes		5,830	100.0

Idaho Legislative District 27 House Seat A Democratic Primary Election, 2024
Party	Candidate	Votes	%
Democratic	Damian D. Rodriguez	209	100.0
Total votes		209	100.0

Idaho Legislative District 27 House Seat A General Election, 2024
Party	Candidate	Votes	%
Republican	Douglas Pickett (incumbent)	16,276	84.4%
Democratic	Damian D. Rodriguez	3,006	15.6%
Total votes		19,282	100%

Seat B

Idaho Legislative District 27 House Seat B Republican Primary Election, 2024
Party	Candidate	Votes	%
Republican	Clay Handy (incumbent)	3,749	59.31
Republican	Pat Field	2,572	40.69
Total votes		6,321	100.0

Idaho Legislative District 27 House Seat B General Election, 2024
Party	Candidate	Votes	%
Republican	Clay Handy (incumbent)	17,453	100%
Total votes		17,453	100%
Republican hold			

=== District 28 ===
Seat A

Idaho Legislative District 28 House Seat A Republican Primary Election, 2024
Party	Candidate	Votes	%
Republican	Richard (Rick) Cheatum (incumbent)	2,823	39.97
Republican	James Lamborn	2,343	32.17
Republican	Mike Saville	1,897	26.86
Total votes		7,063	100.0

Idaho Legislative District 28 House Seat A General Election, 2024
Party	Candidate	Votes	%
Republican	Richard (Rick) Cheatum (incumbent)	20,236	100%
Total votes		20,236	100%
Republican hold			

Seat B

Idaho Legislative District 28 House Seat B Republican Primary Election, 2024
Party	Candidate	Votes	%
Republican	Dan Garner (incumbent)	3,890	55.53
Republican	Kirk Jackson	3,115	44.47
Total votes		7,005	100.0

Idaho Legislative District 28 House Seat B Democratic Primary Election, 2020
Party	Candidate	Votes	%
Democratic	Jayson Meline	563	100.0
Total votes		563	100.0

Idaho Legislative District 28 House Seat B General Election, 2020
Party	Candidate	Votes	%
Republican	Dan Garner (incumbent)	18,188	76.7%
Democratic	Jayson Meline	5,514	23.3%
Total votes		23,702	100%

=== District 29 ===
Seat A

Idaho Legislative District 29 House Seat A Republican Primary Election, 2024
Party	Candidate	Votes	%
Republican	Dustin W. Manwaring (incumbent)	2,596	100.0
Total votes		2,596	100.0

Idaho Legislative District 29 House Seat A Democratic Primary Election, 2024
Party	Candidate	Votes	%
Democratic	Mary Shea	1,143	100.0
Total votes		1,143	100.0

Idaho Legislative District 29 House Seat A General Election, 2024
Party	Candidate	Votes	%
Republican	Dustin W. Manwaring (incumbent)	12,214	55.2%
Democratic	Mary Shea	9,910	44.8%
Total votes		22,124	100%

Seat B

Idaho Legislative District 29 House Seat B Republican Primary Election, 2024
Party	Candidate	Votes	%
Republican	Tanya Burgoyne	2,571	100.0
Total votes		2,571	100.0

Idaho Legislative District 29 House Seat B Democratic Primary Election, 2024
Party	Candidate	Votes	%
Democratic	Nate Roberts (incumbent)	1,134	100.0
Total votes		1,134	100.0

Idaho Legislative District 29 House Seat B General Election, 2024
Party	Candidate	Votes	%
Republican	Tanya Burgoyne	11,498	52.6%
Democratic	Nate Roberts (incumbent)	10,359	47.4%
Total votes		21,857	100%

=== District 30 ===
Seat A

Idaho Legislative District 30 House Seat A Republican Primary Election, 2024
Party	Candidate	Votes	%
Republican	David Cannon (incumbent)	3,960	53.40
Republican	Josh Sorensen	3,456	46.60
Total votes		7,416	100.0

Idaho Legislative District 30 House Seat A General Election, 2024
Party	Candidate	Votes	%
Republican	David Cannon (incumbent)	19,046	100%
Total votes		19,046	100%
Republican hold			

Seat B

Idaho Legislative District 30 House Seat B Republican Primary Election, 2024
Party	Candidate	Votes	%
Republican	Ben G. Fuhriman	3,763	50.01
Republican	Julianne Young (incumbent)	3,761	49.99
Total votes		7,524	100.0

Idaho Legislative District 30 House Seat B Democratic Primary Election, 2024
Party	Candidate	Votes	%
Democratic	Breane L. Buckingham	276	100.00
Total votes		276	100.0

Idaho Legislative District 30 House Seat B General Election, 2024
Party	Candidate	Votes	%
Republican	Ben G. Fuhriman	17,191	82%
Democratic	Breane L. Buckingham	3,777	18%
Total votes		20,968	100%

=== District 31 ===
Seat A

Idaho Legislative District 31 House Seat A Republican Primary Election, 2024
Party	Candidate	Votes	%
Republican	Jerald Raymond (incumbent)	8,623	100.00
Total votes		8,623	100.0

Idaho Legislative District 31 House Seat A Democratic Primary Election, 2024
Party	Candidate	Votes	%
Democratic	Connie Delaney	413	100.00
Total votes		413	100.0

Idaho Legislative District 31 House Seat A General Election, 2024
Party	Candidate	Votes	%
Republican	Jerald Raymond (incumbent)	22,966	86%
Democratic	Connie Delaney	3,735	14%
Total votes		26,701	100%

Seat B

Idaho Legislative District 31 House Seat B Republican Primary Election,2024
Party	Candidate	Votes	%
Republican	Rod Furniss (incumbent)	5,304	51.30
Republican	Karey Hanks	5,036	48.70
Total votes		10,340	100.0

Idaho Legislative District 31 House Seat B Democratic Primary Election, 2024
Party	Candidate	Votes	%
Democratic	Wayne Talmadge	408	100.0
Total votes		408	100.0

Idaho Legislative District 31 House Seat B General Election, 2024
Party	Candidate	Votes	%
Republican	Rod Furniss (incumbent)	23,007	86.2%
Democratic	Wayne Talmadge	3,676	13.8%
Total votes		26,683	100%

=== District 32 ===
Seat A

Idaho Legislative District 32 House Seat A Republican Primary Election, 2024
Party	Candidate	Votes	%
Republican	Stephanie Mickelsen (incumbent)	4,089	60.32
Republican	Kelly Golden	2,184	32.22
Republican	Sean Calvert Crystal	506	7.46
Total votes		6,779	100.0

Idaho Legislative District 32 House Seat A General Election, 2024
Party	Candidate	Votes	%
Republican	Stephanie Mickelsen (incumbent)	16,117	100%
Total votes		16,117	100%
Republican hold			

Seat B

Idaho Legislative District 32 House Seat B Republican Primary Election, 2024
Party	Candidate	Votes	%
Republican	Wendy Horman (incumbent)	3,236	45.51
Republican	Sean Coletti	2,522	35.47
Republican	Bryan Smith	1,352	19.02
Total votes		7,110	100.0

Idaho Legislative District 32 House Seat B Democratic Primary Election, 2024
Party	Candidate	Votes	%
Democratic	Patricia Dustin Stanger	231	100.0
Total votes		231	100.0

Idaho Legislative District 32 House Seat B General Election, 2024
Party	Candidate	Votes	%
Republican	Wendy Horman (incumbent)	16,883	78%
Democratic	Cecile Perez	4,770	22%
Total votes		21,653	100%

=== District 33 ===
Seat A

Idaho Legislative District 33 House Seat A Republican Primary Election, 2024
Party	Candidate	Votes	%
Republican	Barbara Ehardt (incumbent)	3,122	100.0
Total votes		3,122	100.0

Idaho Legislative District 33 House Seat A Democratic Primary Election, 2024
Party	Candidate	Votes	%
Democratic	Miranda Marquit	438	100.0
Total votes		438	100.0

Idaho Legislative District 33 House Seat A General Election, 2024
Party	Candidate	Votes	%
Republican	Barbara Ehardt (incumbent)	12,148	63.1%
Democratic	Miranda Marquit	7,116	36.9%
Total votes		19,264	100%

Seat B

Idaho Legislative District 33 House Seat B Republican Primary Election, 2020
Party	Candidate	Votes	%
Republican	Marco Erickson (incumbent)	2,377	55.37
Republican	Jilene Burger	1,916	44.63
Total votes		4,293	100.0

Idaho Legislative District 33 House Seat B General Election, 2024
Party	Candidate	Votes	%
Republican	Marco Erickson (incumbent)	12,849	100%
Total votes		12,849	100%
Republican hold			

=== District 34 ===
Seat A

Idaho Legislative District 34 House Seat A Republican Primary Election, 2020
Party	Candidate	Votes	%
Republican	Jon O Weber (incumbent)	3,543	100.00
Total votes		3,543	100.0

Idaho Legislative District 34 House Seat A General Election, 2020
Party	Candidate	Votes	%
Republican	Jon O Weber (incumbent)	15,590	100%
Total votes		15,590	100%
Republican hold			

Seat B

Idaho Legislative District 34 House Seat B Republican Primary Election, 2024
Party	Candidate	Votes	%
Republican	Britt Raybould (incumbent)	2,644	65.69
Republican	Larry E Golden	1,381	34.31
Total votes		4,045	100.0

Idaho Legislative District 34 House Seat B General Election, 2024
Party	Candidate	Votes	%
Republican	Britt Raybould (incumbent)	15,456	100%
Total votes			
Republican hold			

=== District 35 ===
Seat A

Idaho Legislative District 35 House Seat A Republican Primary Election, 2024
Party	Candidate	Votes	%
Republican	Kevin Andrus (incumbent)	6,850	100.00
Total votes		6,850	100.0

Idaho Legislative District 35 House Seat A Democratic Primary Election, 2024
Party	Candidate	Votes	%
Democratic	Joseph Messerly	480	100.00
Total votes		480	100.0

Idaho Legislative District 35 House Seat A General Election, 2024
Party	Candidate	Votes	%
Republican	Kevin Andrus (incumbent)	20,643	76.8%
Democratic	Joseph Messerly	6,232	23.2%
Total votes		26,875	100%

Seat B

Idaho Legislative District 35 House Seat B Republican Primary Election, 2024
Party	Candidate	Votes	%
Republican	Joshua Wheeler (incumbent)	5,048	62.38
Republican	Brett C. Skidmore	3,044	37.62
Total votes		8,092	100.0

Idaho Legislative District 35 House Seat B Democratic Primary Election, 2024
Party	Candidate	Votes	%
Democratic	Maggie Shaw	490	100.00
Total votes		490	100.0

Idaho Legislative District 35 House Seat B General Election, 2024
Party	Candidate	Votes	%
Republican	Joshua Wheeler (incumbent)	20,346	76.2%
Democratic	Maggie Shaw	6,356	23.8%
Total votes		26,702	100%

== See also ==
- List of Idaho state legislatures
