= Idaho Freedom Caucus =

US ultra-conservative policial group

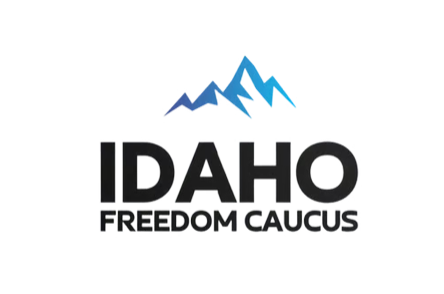
- Co-Chairs: Tammy Nichols; Heather Scott
- Split from: House Republican Caucus
- Ideology: Limited government; American nationalism; National conservatism; Paleoconservatism; Right-wing populism; Trumpism; Factions: Right-libertarianism
- Political position: Right-wing to far-right
- National affiliation: Republican Party

Website
- https://idahofreedomcaucus.org/

The Idaho Freedom Caucus is a legislative caucus of ultra-conservative Republican members in the Idaho legislature that promotes steep spending and tax reductions, limited government power, election reform, and is critical of LGBT+ initiatives. It was affiliated with the State Freedom Caucus Network, modeled after the Freedom Caucus in the U.S. House of Representatives, and has contributed to the rightward shift of the state's legislature since 2022.

In 2024, after in-fighting between the Network's regional leadership and state House caucus members, the Network cut ties with the Caucus, vowing to create a new Freedom Caucus.

== History ==
The Caucus was founded with support by the State Freedom Caucus Network, an initiative of the Conservative Partnership Institute that aims to push state legislatures to the right and "challenge state leadership and 'fake Republicans'".

In May 2024, it was revealed that the Network's hired state director Maria Nate engaged in a heated conversation with the Caucus' Co-Chair, Rep. Heather Scott. The argument revolved around the Caucus' choice for Speaker of the House, with Scott supporting Mike Moyle. Nate viewed Moyle as unwilling to support conservative policies, like school choice. After the Republican primary elections ahead of 2024 elections, ultra-conservatives defeated moderate Republicans, fueling the divide in policy and governing style between the Network and the state caucus.

In July 2024, the Caucus fired Nate and created its own executive director position, which was filled by former state Senator Scott Herndon, who had been defeated in the republican primary a few months earlier.

== Political positions and involvement ==
=== Intra-party relationship ===
The Caucus has a contentious relationship with the Republican leadership in both chambers of the legislature, the larger Republican caucus, and Governor Brad Little, with commentators calling it a "war". Caucus members accuse the party's establishment and moderate members of failing to advance core conservative policies, while Republican critics of the Caucus accuse its members of lashing out at dissenters and spreading misinformation to voters.

In 2023, Caucus members Sen. Glenneda Zuiderveld and Sen. Scott Herndon published statements criticizing their Republican colleagues for their ties to lobbyists and alleged lack of fiscal restraint in crafting the state budget, respectively. In response, Senate President Pro Tempore Chuck Winder condemned both Senators for their statements, calling them inflammatory and degrading. Winder removed Zuiderveld from her Vice Chair position on the Health and Welfare Committee; Zuiderveld claimed the Republican leadership was attempting to "silence" her.

Winder was later defeated by a Freedom Caucus-backed challenger in the 2024 Republican primary. Winder accused the Freedom Caucus and its associated political action committees of funding "deceptive and misleading" calls to voters that accused Winder of supporting illegal immigration and amensty for illegal immigrants.

After the Idaho Republican Party's summer convention in 2023, Scott celebrated numerous changes to the party's structure promoted by Chairwoman Dorothy Moon, referring to it as a "purge" of "democrats in disguise" and "non-believing party platform members". The convention voted to: rescind executive committee voting rights from various affiliated organizations (such as the Idaho Young Republicans and the Idaho Federation of Republican Women), publicly censure Gov. Little and other lawmakers for failing to pass a bill that would create a cause of action for parents to sue schools that host "harmful material" in libraries, and require new registrants to the Party to wait two years before being allowed to vote in a party primary. The President of the Women's Federation said the convention represented the growing divide between "established Republicans" and those with "roots in the Libertarian Party and right-wing John Birth Society." Moon, an ally of the Caucus, has been called the solidification of Freedom Caucus control over the state Party.

=== Education ===
In 2023, the Caucus called on the Idaho Commission for Libraries to "withdraw from the American Library Association" due to claims that its President, Emily Drabinski, would "expos[e] children to explicit materials and injec[t] hard-left politics and sexuality into publicly funded libraries." The Idaho State Librarian clarified that the Commission is not a member of the ALA and argued that the state's librarians "do not have an agenda."

The Caucus supported the "Freedom in Education Saving Accounts Program", a school choice initiative that would subsidize a student's private school enrollment using the funds that would have been given to that student's designated public or charter school.

=== Immigration ===
Caucus members have supported bills that would authorize state and local law enforcement officials to enforce federal immigration law and cooperate with Immigration and Customs Enforcement. The Caucus also called for stronger immigration status checks across the workforce, in schools, and in hospitals, requiring employers and institutions to report illegal immigrants.

=== LGBT+ issues ===
In 2018, Rep. Bryan Zollinger, the co-founder of the Idaho House Freedom Caucus, expressed support for the small-government, individual liberty-focused philosophy of Rep. Dom Gelsomino, the state's first openly gay Republican to seek office in the state.

== Members ==
=== Current members ===
- Sen. Tammy Nichols – Co-Chair
- Rep. Heather Scott – Co-Chair
- Sen. Phil Hart
- Rep. Joe Alfieri
- Rep. Vito Barbieri
- Rep. Rob Beiswenger
- Rep. Kyle Harris
- Rep. Dale Hawkins
- Rep. Elaine Price – lost re-election in the 2026 Republican primary.
- Rep. Cornel Rasor
- Rep. Steve Tanner
- Rep. Tony Wisniewski

=== Former members ===
- Rep. Bryan Zollinger – Co-founder and former Chair of the Idaho House Freedom Caucus.
- Sen. Cindy Carlson – resigned from the caucus.
- Sen. Scott Herndon – lost re-election to a moderate opponent in the 2024 Republican primary.
- Sen. Chris Trakel
- Sen. Glenneda Zuiderveld – resigned from the Caucus in July 2024.
- Rep. Tina Lambert
- Rep. Mike Kingsley
- Rep. Josh Tanner
