= Ben Fuhriman =

American politician

Member of the Idaho House of Representatives from the 30th district
- Incumbent
- Assumed office December 5, 2024 Serving with David Cannon
- Preceded by: Julianne Young

Personal details
- Born: Idaho Falls, Idaho
- Party: Republican
- Education: Brigham Young University; Montana State University
- Website: fuhrimanforidaho.com

Ben G. Fuhriman is an American politician. In 2024 he started serving as a Republican member of the Idaho House of Representatives, representing the 30th district.

Fuhriman graduated from Brigham Young University and Montana State University. He is a member of the Bingham County Republican Central Committee.

In the 2024 Idaho House of Representatives election, he defeated incumbent Julianne Young in the Republican primary.
