= Tanya Burgoyne =

American politician

Member of the Idaho House of Representatives from the 29th district
- Incumbent
- Assumed office December 5, 2024 Serving with Dustin Manwaring
- Preceded by: Nate Roberts

Personal details
- Party: Republican
- Website: www.burgoyneforidaho.com

Tanya Burgoyne is an American politician who is currently serving as a Republican member of the Idaho House of Representatives, representing the 29th district. She serves on the Commerce & Human Resources, Environment, Energy & Technology, and Health & Welfare committees.

She is a graduate of Ricks College. In the 2024 Idaho House of Representatives election, she was elected defeating Democrat incumbent Nate Roberts.
