= Julie VanOrden =

American politician from Idaho

Member of the Idaho Senate from District 30
- Incumbent
- Assumed office December 1, 2022
- Preceded by: Kevin Cook (redistricting)

Member of the Idaho House of Representatives from District 31 Seat B
- In office December 1, 2012 – November 30, 2018
- Preceded by: Thomas Loertscher (redistricting)
- Succeeded by: Julianne Young

Personal details
- Born: Julie Tsukamoto Pocatello, Idaho, U.S.
- Party: Republican
- Education: College of Southern Idaho; Idaho State University
- Website: julievanorden.com

Julie VanOrden (born in Pocatello, Idaho) is a Republican Idaho State Representative since 2012 representing District 31 in Seat B.

== Education ==
Born Julie Tsukamoto, she attended Blackfoot High School, the College of Southern Idaho, and earned her associate degree from Idaho State University's vocational technical school.

== 2018 primary election ==
On May 15, 2018, Julie VanOrden was defeated by Blackfoot area political activist, home-educator, and stay-at-home mother of 10 children, Julianne Young. Young campaigned against VanOrden's efforts to update Idaho sex education statue which dated by to the 1970s.

== Idaho Public Charter School Commission ==
In July, 2018 Rep. VanOrden was appointed by Idaho House Speaker Scott Bedke to serve a four-year term on the Idaho Public Charter School Commission. The commission oversees the regulation of charter schools in the State of Idaho.

== Election history ==
District 31 House Seat B - Bingham County
Year	Candidate	Votes	Pct	Candidate	Votes	Pct
2012 Primary	Julie VanOrden	3,891	62.4%	Jim Marriott (incumbent)	2,340	37.6%
2012 General	Julie VanOrden	12,989	75.8%	Jeannie James	4,148	24.2%
2014 Primary	Julie VanOrden (incumbent)	5,144	100.0%			
2014 General	Julie VanOrden (incumbent)	9,201	100.0%			
2016 Primary	Julie VanOrden (incumbent)	2,488	100.0%			
2016 General	Julie VanOrden (incumbent)	14,427	100.0%			
2018 Primary	Julie VanOrden (incumbent)	3,062	45.9%	Julianne Young	3,616	54.1%
