= Senator Brackett =

Senator Brackett may refer to:

- Bert Brackett (born 1944), Idaho State Senate
- Edgar T. Brackett (1853–1924), New York State Senate
