= Josh Wheeler =

Josh Wheeler may refer to:

- Josh Wheeler (politician), member of the Idaho House of Representatives
- Josh Wheeler (wheelchair rugby), American wheelchair rugby player
- Josh Wheeler, protagonist of the 2019 TV series Daybreak

== See also ==
- Joshua Wheeler, United States Army soldier killed in Iraq
