= Matthew Bundy =

American politician

Member of the Idaho House of Representatives
- In office December 1, 2020 – November 30, 2024
- Preceded by: Christy Zito
- Succeeded by: Rob Beiswenger
- Constituency: 23rd district Seat A (2020–2022); 8th district Seat A (2022–2024)

Personal details
- Born: Ogden, Utah
- Party: Republican
- Education: Weber State University; University of Utah

Military service
- Allegiance: United States
- Branch/service: United States Air Force
- Years of service: 1984–2004

Matthew Bundy is an American politician who served in the Idaho House of Representatives from Idaho's 8th district. He was elected to the chamber after incumbent Republican Christy Zito decided to run for a seat in the Idaho Senate instead of re–election. He defeated Democratic candidate Benjamin Lee in the general election, winning 79.2% to 20.8% in the general election.

== Elections ==
District 23 Seat B - Elmore and Owyhee Counties and part of Twin Falls County
Year	Candidate	Votes	Pct	Candidate	Votes	Pct	Candidate	Votes	Pct
2012 Primary	Pete Nielsen (incumbent)	2,225	45.7%	Matthew Bundy	1,498	30.8%	Steve Millington	1,144	23.5%

District 23 Seat A - Elmore and Owyhee Counties and part of Twin Falls County
Year	Candidate	Votes	Pct	Candidate	Votes	Pct
2020 Primary	Matthew Bundy	3,723	55.9%	Andrew Owens	2,936	44.1%
2020 General	Matthew Bundy	13,574	79.2%	Benjamin Lee	3,574	20.8%
