= Debbie Geyer =

American politician

Member-elect of the Idaho House of Representatives from the 11B district
- Assuming office December 2026
- Succeeding: Lucas Cayler

Personal details
- Party: Republican

Debbie Geyer is an American politician. A member of the Republican Party, she is the member-elect for the 11B district of the Idaho House of Representatives.
