= Lance Clow =

American politician from Idaho

Member of the Idaho House of Representatives
- In office December 1, 2012 – November 30, 2025
- Preceded by: Leon Smith
- Succeeded by: Don Hall
- Constituency: 24th district Seat A (2012–2022); 25th district Seat A (2022–2025)

Personal details
- Born: December 12, 1947 (age 78) Los Angeles, California
- Party: Republican
- Education: California Lutheran University; California State University, Northridge; Idaho State University

Lance W. Clow (born December 12, 1947) is a former Republican Idaho State Representative, serving from 2012 to 2025.

Clow announced on November 13, 2025, that he would not seek re-election in 2026 and would be resigning from office at the end of the month, citing health and other personal reasons.

== Education ==
Clow earned his BA in economics from California Lutheran University, Graduate Work in accounting and finance from California State University, Northridge, and in business administration from Idaho State University.

== Elections ==
District 24 House Seat A - Part of Twin Falls County
Year	Candidate	Votes	Pct	Candidate	Votes	Pct
2012 Primary	Lance Clow	3,038	100%			
2012 General	Lance Clow	13,001	100%			
2014 Primary	Lance Clow (incumbent)	2,805	100%			
2014 General	Lance Clow (incumbent)	7,275	70.5%	Dale Varney	3,044	29.5%
2016 Primary	Lance Clow (incumbent)	3,157	100%			
2016 General	Lance Clow (incumbent)	12,035	73.0%	Dale Varney	4,443	27.0%
