= John Rusche =

American politician from Idaho

Minority Leader of the Idaho House of Representatives
- In office 2008–2016
- Preceded by: Wendy Jaquet
- Succeeded by: Mat Erpelding

Member of the Idaho House of Representatives
- In office December 1, 2004 – December 1, 2016
- Preceded by: Mike Naccarato
- Succeeded by: Mike Kingsley
- Constituency: 7th district Seat B (2004–2012); 6th district Seat B (2012–2016)

Personal details
- Born: December 3, 1950 (age 75) Waukesha, Wisconsin
- Party: Democratic
- Education: University of Notre Dame; Washington University in St. Louis
- Website: ruscheforidaho.com

John M. Rusche (born December 3, 1950, in Waukesha, Wisconsin) was a Democratic Idaho State Representative representing District 6 in the B seat from 2012 to 2016. Rusche served in the District 6 B seat from 2004 to 2012. Rusche served as the minority leader from 2008 to 2016.

== Education ==
Rusche graduated from Aquinas High School (Wisconsin) in 1969. He earned his Bachelor of Science in chemical engineering from the University of Notre Dame, and Doctor of Medicine from Washington University School of Medicine.

== Elections ==
District 7B

2016

Rusche was unopposed for the May 17, 2016, Democratic primary. Rusche lost to Mike Kingsley by 3,130 votes.

Rusche supported Hillary Clinton for the Democratic Party presidential primaries, 2016.

2014

Rusche was unopposed for the May 20, 2014, Democratic primary. Rusche won against Mike Kingsley by 48 votes.

2012

Rusche was redistricted to District 6, and with Democratic Representative Shirley Ringo redistricted to District 5, Rusche was unopposed for the May 15, 2012, Democratic primary, and won with 984 votes, and won the November 6, 2012, general election with 9,531 votes (52.3%) against Republican nominee Daniel Santiago.

District 6B

2010

Rusche was unopposed for the May 25, 2010, Democratic primary, and won with 1,552 votes, and was unopposed for the November 2, 2010, general election, winning with 9,499 votes.

2008

Rusche was unopposed for the May 27, 2008, Democratic primary, and won with 1,516 votes, and won the November 4, 2008, general election, winning with 13,608 votes against a write-in candidate, who received none.

2006

Rusche was unopposed for the May 23, 2006, Democratic primary, and won with 1,256 votes, and was unopposed for the November 7, 2006, general election, winning with 9,824 votes.

2004

When Democratic Representative Mike Naccarato ran for the District 7 senate seat leaving the B seat open, Rusche was unopposed for the May 25, 2004, Democratic primary, and won with 1,998 votes, and won the November 2, 2004, general election with 8,850 votes (50.9%) against Republican nominee Charlie Pottenger.
