= Tim Corder =

American business owner, farmer, and politician from Idaho

Member of the Idaho Senate from the 22nd district
- In office December 1, 2004 – December 1, 2012
- Preceded by: Fred Kennedy
- Succeeded by: Russ Fulcher

Personal details
- Born: October 8, 1949 (age 76) Nampa, Idaho
- Party: Republican
- Spouse: LaVonne
- Occupation: Business owner, farmer, politician

Tim Corder (born October 8, 1949, in Nampa, Idaho) is an American politician who served as a Republican member of the Idaho Senate from 2004 to 2012. He is married to LaVonne, father to three, and grandfather to three. Corder has been a farmer for over three decades.

== Early life and career ==
Corder attended Nampa High School and received his diploma in 1967. He is a farmer and owner of a trucking company. He was in the United States Army from 1968 to 1971, and served in Vietnam during the Vietnam War in 1970.

Corder worked on Sherri Ybarra's campaign in the fall of 2014, then worked in the State Department of Education as her legislative liaison until February 2016.

== Elections ==
2012

After redistricting, Corder and Senator Bert Brackett were drawn into the same district and faced off in the Republican primary. Corder was defeated in the primary by Brackett earning only 42.6% of the vote.

2010

Corder defeated Marla S. Lawson in the Republican primary, earning 58.3% of the vote.

Corder won the general election, earning 75.9% of the vote against Henry E. Hibbert.

2008

Corder defeated Clayton E. Cramer in the Republican primary, earning 62% of the vote.

Corder won the general election, earning 73.3% of the vote against G. Rustyn Casiano.

2006

Corder was unopposed in the Republican primary.

Corder won the general election against Henry E. Hibbert, earning 67.91% of the vote.

2004

Corder defeated Marla S. Lawson in the Republican primary, earning 53.5% of the vote.

Corder won the general election against James Alexander, earning 55% of the vote.

== Committees ==
He was a member of:

- Agricultural Affairs
- Chairman of Local Government and Taxation
- Transportation Committee
- Mountain Home Highway District Committee
- Childhood Development Task Force
- Health Care Task Force
- Mental Health Subcommittee

== Organizations ==
He is a member of:

- Idaho Ag in the Classroom
- Leadership Idaho Agriculture
