= James Ruchti =

American attorney and politician

Member of the Idaho Senate from the 29th district
- Incumbent
- Assumed office December 1, 2022
- Preceded by: Eva Nye

Member of the Idaho House of Representatives from the 29B district
- In office December 1, 2020 – November 30, 2022
- Preceded by: Elaine Smith
- Succeeded by: Nate Roberts
- In office December 1, 2006 – November 30, 2010
- Preceded by: Elmer Martinez
- Succeeded by: Jim Guthrie

Personal details
- Born: James Daw Ruchti Pocatello, Idaho, U.S.
- Party: Democratic
- Children: 2
- Education: United States Military Academy (BS); University of Idaho (JD)

Military service
- Branch/service: United States Army
- Years of service: 1993–1998
- Rank: Captain

James Ruchti is an American attorney and politician. A Democrat, he has served as a member of the Idaho Senate from the 29th district since 2022. He served in the Idaho House of Representatives from 2020 to 2022, having previously served from 2006 to 2010.

== Early life and education ==
Ruchti was born and raised in Pocatello, Idaho. He earned a Bachelor of Science degree from the United States Military Academy in 1993 and a Juris Doctor from the University of Idaho College of Law in 2001.

== Career ==
Ruchti served in the United States Army, retiring with the rank of captain. From 1993 to 1998, he was an officer with the Military Intelligence Corps. Ruchti is a personal injury attorney in Pocatello.

== Political career ==
From 2006 to 2010, he served as a member of the Idaho House of Representatives from the 29th district. He was elected to the seat again in November 2020. He assumed office on December 1, 2020, succeeding Elaine Smith.

Ruchti has written op-ed columns on Idaho politics for the Post Register. In 2022, he chose to run for Idaho Senate instead of reelection to the House of Representatives, and endorsed Democrat Nate Roberts to succeed him. He won the November election.
