= Diane Bilyeu =

American politician and realtor from Idaho

Member of the Idaho Senate
- In office December 1, 2006 – November 30, 2012
- Preceded by: Bert Marley
- Succeeded by: Roy Lacey
- Constituency: 29th district
- In office December 1, 1968 – November 30, 1970
- Succeeded by: Chick Bilyeu

Personal details
- Born: February 11, 1935 (age 91) Pocatello, Idaho
- Party: Democratic
- Spouse: Chick Bilyeu (m. 1961; d. 2007)
- Education: Idaho State University
- Occupation: realtor, appraiser, broker

Diane Bilyeu (née Falter) (born February 11, 1935) is a Democratic politician from Pocatello, Idaho. She was Idaho State Senator from District 29 in Pocatello, from 2006 to 2012. She earlier served in the Idaho Senate from 1968 through 1970.

== Background ==
Bilyeu is a former Democratic Idaho State Senator and the widow of Chick Bilyeu, a longtime professor at Idaho State University in Pocatello.

She announced her retirement February 27, 2012, to enjoy more time with family.

Bilyeu is the author of A Conversation With Shakespeare, a reader's theater script, published by DB Publishing, 2013.

She supported A. J. Balkoff in the 2018 Idaho gubernatorial election primary election for the Idaho Democratic Party.

== Education ==
Diane Bilyeu received her education from the following institution:

- BA, Idaho State University, 1968

== Family ==
Diane Bilyeu is widowed with three children named Brigette, Clark, and Valencia.

== Legislative committees ==
Diane Bilyeu has been a member of the following committees:

- Finance, Member
- Local Government and Taxation, Member
- Transportation, Member

== Political experience ==
Diane Bilyeu has had the following political experience:

- Senator, Idaho State Senate, 1968–1970, 2006–2012
- County Assessor, Bannock County, 1985-2006
- Member, Idaho State Board of Education, 1978-1988
