= Bert Brackett =

American politician and rancher from Idaho

Member of the Idaho Senate from the 23rd district
- In office July 2008 – December 1, 2020
- Preceded by: Tom Gannon
- Succeeded by: Christy Zito

Member of the Idaho House of Representatives from district 23, seat B
- In office November 2005 – July 2008
- Preceded by: Douglas Jones
- Succeeded by: Stephen Hartgen

Personal details
- Born: October 17, 1944 (age 81) Twin Falls, Idaho, U.S.
- Party: Republican
- Spouse: Paula
- Education: University of Idaho (BS)
- Profession: Rancher

Military service
- Branch/service: Idaho National Guard

Noy Elbert "Bert" Brackett III (born October 17, 1944) is an American politician who served as a member of the Idaho Senate for the 23rd district from 2008 to 2020.

== Early life and education ==
Bert Brackett was born in Twin Falls, Idaho, in 1944. Brackett received a Bachelor of Science in agriculture at the University of Idaho in 1966.

== Career ==
Brackett served one term in the Idaho House of Representatives. In 2008, Brackett was elected to represent Idaho's 23rd Legislative district, which includes Twin Falls.

Brackett is a rancher at Flat Creek Ranch. He has also served for the Idaho National Guard.

=== Idaho House of Representatives ===
In October 2005, when long-time incumbent Representative Douglas Jones resigned to take a job out of state, the Legislative District 23 Republican Central Committee met to fill the vacancy in the House seat. The committee sent three names in order of preference to Governor Dirk Kempthorne to fill the vacancy: Brackett, Benny Blick of Castleford, and Jim Patrick of Filer. Governor Otter appointed Brackett to serve the remainder of Gannon's term.

==== Committees ====
Brackett served on the Agricultural Affairs Committee and Education Committee in 2006, the Appropriations Committee and Joint Finance-Appropriations Committee from 2007 to 2008, Energy, Environment, and Technology in 2008, and the Resources and Conservation Committee from 2006 to 2008.

=== Idaho Senate ===
In July 2008, after the death of Senator Tom Gannon, the Legislative District 23 Republican Central Committee met to fill the vacancy in the Senate seat and replace Gannon's name on the upcoming general election ballot. The committee selected Representative Brackett to replace Gannon's name on the ballot and sent three names in order of preference to Governor Butch Otter to fill the vacancy: Brackett, Hartgen, and Jeanne Gannon of Buhl, the widow of Senator Gannon. Governor Otter appointed Brackett to serve the remainder of Gannon's term.

After redistricting, incumbent Senators Brackett and Tim Corder, of Mountain Home, were drawn into the same district and faced off in the Republican primary in 2012. Brackett was endorsed by Governor Otter and won the nomination.

==== Committees ====
- Transportation Committee (chairman)
- Resources and Environment Committee (vice chairman)

Brackett previously served on the Finance Committee and Joint Finance-Appropriations Committee from 2009 to 2012 and on the Agriculture Affairs 2013 to 2016.

== Personal life ==
Brackett and his wife, Paula, have five children.

== Elections ==
District 23 House Seat B - Owyhee and part of Twin Falls County
Year	Candidate	Votes	Pct	Candidate	Votes	Pct
2006 general	Bert Brackett (incumbent)	9,357	100%			
2008 primary	Bert Brackett (incumbent)	3,343	100%			

District 23 Senate - Owyhee County and part of Twin Falls County
Year	Candidate	Votes	Pct	Candidate	Votes	Pct
2008 general	Bert Brackett (incumbent)	10,550	66.5%	Bill Chisholm	5,312	33.5%
2010 primary	Bert Brackett (incumbent)	4,056	100%			
2010 general	Bert Brackett (incumbent)	9,689	100%			

District 23 Senate - Elmore and Owyhee Counties and part of Twin Falls County
Year	Candidate	Votes	Pct	Candidate	Votes	Pct
2012 primary	Bert Brackett (incumbent)	3,009	57.4%	Tim Corder (incumbent)	2,230	42.6%
2012 general	Bert Brackett (incumbent)	9,177	68.8%	Bill Chisholm	4,165	31.2%
2014 primary	Bert Brackett (incumbent)	3,573	100%			
2014 general	Bert Brackett (incumbent)	8,022	100%			
2016 primary	Bert Brackett (incumbent)	4,052	100%			
2016 general	Bert Brackett (incumbent)	12,422	100%			
