= Kent Marmon =

American politician

Member of the Idaho House of Representatives from the 11th district
- Incumbent
- Assumed office December 5, 2024 Serving with Lucas Cayler

Personal details
- Party: Republican
- Website: www.marmonforidaho.org

Kent A. Marmon is an American politician who is currently serving as a Republican member of the Idaho House of Representatives, representing the 11th district.

In the 2024 Idaho House of Representatives election, he beat Julie Yamamoto in the Republican primary.
