= Chris Abernathy =

American politician from Idaho

Member of the Idaho House of Representatives from 29th district
- In office December 1, 2018 – November 30, 2020
- Preceded by: Dustin Manwaring
- Succeeded by: Dustin Manwaring

Personal details
- Born: Pocatello, Idaho, U.S.
- Party: Democratic

Chris Abernathy is an American politician who served as a member of the Idaho House of Representatives from the 29th district, which includes a portion of Bannock County, Idaho.

== Early life and education ==
Born and raised in Pocatello, Idaho, Abernathy graduated from Highland High School. He attended Idaho State University before joining an apprentice program sponsored by the International Brotherhood of Electrical Workers.

== Career ==
For 24 years, Abernathy has worked as a electrician and union executive. A member of the Democratic Party, he assumed office in 2018 after defeating incumbent Republican Dustin Manwaring. In the 2020 election, Abernathy lost to Manwaring in a rematch.
