= Kenny Wroten =

American politician

Member of the Idaho House of Representatives from the 13B district
- In office December 1, 2022 – November 30, 2024
- Succeeded by: Steve Tanner

Personal details
- Party: Republican

Kenny Wroten is an American politician. He served as a Republican member for the 13B district of the Idaho House of Representatives.
