= Chris Allgood =

American politician

Member of the Idaho House of Representatives from the 11B district
- In office December 1, 2022 – November 30, 2024
- Succeeded by: Lucas Cayler

Personal details
- Party: Republican

Chris Allgood is an American politician. He served as a Republican member for the 11B district of the Idaho House of Representatives.
