= Roy Lacey =

American politician from Idaho

Member of the Idaho Senate from District 29
- In office December 1, 2012 – December 1, 2016
- Preceded by: Diane Bilyeu

Member of the Idaho House of Representatives from District 30 Seat A
- In office December 1, 2010 – December 1, 2012
- Preceded by: Donna Boe
- Succeeded by: Jeff Thompson

Personal details
- Born: November 5, 1947 (age 78) Pocatello, Idaho
- Party: Democratic
- Spouse: Renee
- Children: 4
- Education: Idaho State University
- Occupation: Politician
- Website: roylacey.com

Roy Lacey (born November 5, 1947, in Pocatello, Idaho) was a Democratic Idaho Senator from 2012 to 2016 for District 30, he was also an Idaho State Representative from 2010 to 2012 representing District 30 in the A seat.

== Education ==
Lacey attended Idaho State University and was a senior manager with Union Pacific Railroad.

== Elections ==
In March 2016 Lacey announced he will not be seeking reelection and said "It will be great to just be 'Roy' again." He then served as campaign manager for Rep. Mark Nye who succeeded him for his seat.

- 2014

Roy Lacey ran unopposed in the Democratic primary.

In the general election on November 4, 2014, Roy received 6,193 votes (55.44%) against Kert Howard.

Roy's campaign ran on job creation in Pocatello, his work on the Joint Finance and Appropriations Committee, and his ability to work with both parties to "get the job done".

- 2012

Redistricted to District 29, Lacey chose to run for its open senate seat. Lacey was unopposed in the May 15, 2012, Democratic primary.

Lacey faced Greg Romriell in the general election and won with 53.8% of the vote.

- 2010

When longtime Democratic Representative Donna Boe retired, Lacey ran unopposed for the May 25, 2010, Democratic primary and won with 1,404 votes;

Lacey won the November 2, 2010, general election with 5,315 votes (58.2%) against Brian P. Nugent .
