= Faye Thompson =

American politician

Member of the Idaho House of Representatives from the 8th district
- Incumbent
- Assumed office December 5, 2024 Serving with Rob Beiswenger

Personal details
- Party: Republican
- Website: fayethompson4idaho.com

Faye Thompson is an American politician who is currently serving as a Republican member of the Idaho House of Representatives, representing the 8th district.

In the 2024 Idaho House of Representatives election, she was elected.

== Electoral Record ==
2024 Idaho House of Representatives election, District 8B
Party	Candidate	Votes	%
Republican	Faye Thompson	16,546	67.9
Democratic	Jared Dawson	6,702	27.5
Constitution	Tony Ullrich	1,111	4.6
Total votes		24,359	100
