= Bryan Zollinger =

American politician from Idaho

Member of the Idaho House of Representatives from 33rd district
- In office December 1, 2016 – November 30, 2020
- Preceded by: Linden Bateman
- Succeeded by: Marco Erickson

Personal details
- Born: Rexburg, Idaho, U.S.
- Party: Republican
- Education: University of Utah (BS); Florida Coastal School of Law (JD)

Bryan N. Zollinger is an American attorney and politician who served as a member of the Idaho House of Representatives from the 33rd district from 2016 to 2020.

== Early life and education ==
Zollinger was born and raised in Rexburg, Idaho and graduated from Sugar Salem High School. He earned a Bachelor of Science degree in accounting from the University of Utah and a Juris Doctor from Florida Coastal School of Law.

== Career ==
Zollinger practices law in Idaho Falls, Idaho. Previously, he served as a trustee for the Idaho Falls School Board.

=== Idaho House of Representatives ===
Zollinger along with Mike Kingsley launched Idaho Freedom Caucus, late in the 2017 session. In April 2017, Freedom Caucus collaborated to challenge Governor Butch Otter's veto of the Idaho grocery tax.

In August 2017, Zollinger said that the conspiracy theory that Barack Obama staged the Unite the Right white supremacist rally was "completely plausible".

In 2017, Zollinger served on the following committees:

- Health and Welfare Committee
- Judiciary, Rules and Administration Committee
- Local Government Committee

== Elections ==
When Representative Linden B. Bateman chose not to run for reelection the Idaho House, Zollinger announced as a candidate for the House seat. Zollinger won the Republican primary against David Smith with 56.2% of the vote. Zollinger defeated George P. Morrison in the general election with 66.25% of the vote.

Zollinger for 2022 Idaho gubernatorial election served as Janice McGeachin's Region 6 director.
