= Rod Furniss =

American politician from Idaho

Member of the Idaho House of Representatives
- Incumbent
- Assumed office December 1, 2018
- Preceded by: Karey Hanks
- Constituency: 35th district Seat B (2018–2022); 31st district Seat B (2022–present)

Personal details
- Born: Rigby, Idaho, U.S.
- Party: Republican
- Spouse: Jan Furniss
- Children: 5
- Education: Brigham Young University–Idaho (AS); Idaho State University (BS)

Rod Furniss is an American businessman and politician serving as a member of the Idaho House of Representatives for District 31, seat B.

== Early life and education ==
Furniss was born in Rigby, Idaho and grew up in Menan. He attended Rigby High School.

Furniss attended Ricks College. In 1983, Furniss earned an associate degree in accounting and business management from Brigham Young University–Idaho. In 1985, Furniss earned as bachelor's degree in finance and financial management services from Idaho State University.

== Career ==
Furniss is a former missionary for Church of Christ (Latter Day Saints) in Argentina.

In 1986, Furniss became an Independent Agent with Rod Furniss Chartered Life Underwriter. Furniss is in the insurance and investment business. Furniss is a life insurance underwriter and financial consultant.

On November 6, 2018, Furniss won the election and became a member of Idaho House of Representatives for District 35, seat B. Furniss defeated Jerry L. Browne with 83.7% of the votes.

== Personal life ==
Furniss' wife is Jan Furniss. They have five children.
