= Melissa Durrant =

American politician

Member of the Idaho House of Representatives from the 23A district
- In office December 1, 2022 – November 30, 2024
- Succeeded by: Chris Bruce

Personal details
- Party: Republican

Melissa Durrant is an American politician. She served as a Republican member for the 23A district of the Idaho House of Representatives.
