= Idaho's 23rd legislative district =

American legislative district

Idaho's 23rd legislative district is one of 35 districts of the Idaho Legislature. It is currently represented by Senator Bert Brackett, Republican of Rogerson, Representative Christy Zito, Republican of Hammett, and Representative Megan Blanksma, Republican of Hammett.

== District profile ==
=== 1992–2002 ===
From 1992 to 2002, District 23 consisted of a portion of Twin Falls.

Legislature	Session	Senate	House Seat A	House Seat B
51st (1992 - 1994)	1st	Laird Noh (R)	Ron Black (R)	Mark Stubbs (R)
51st (1992 - 1994)	2nd	Laird Noh (R)	Ron Black (R)	Mark Stubbs (R)
52nd (1994 - 1996)	1st	Laird Noh (R)	Ron Black (R)	Mark Stubbs (R)
52nd (1994 - 1996)	2nd	Laird Noh (R)	Ron Black (R)	Mark Stubbs (R)
53rd (1996 - 1998)	1st	Laird Noh (R)	Ron Black (R)	Mark Stubbs (R)
53rd (1996 - 1998)	2nd	Laird Noh (R)	Ron Black (R)	Mark Stubbs (R)
54th (1998 - 2000)	1st	Laird Noh (R)	Leon Smith (R)	Randy Hansen (R)
54th (1998 - 2000)	2nd	Laird Noh (R)	Leon Smith (R)	Randy Hansen (R)
55th (2000 - 2002)	1st	Laird Noh (R)	Leon Smith (R)	George Swan (R)
55th (2000 - 2002)	2nd	Laird Noh (R)	Leon Smith (R)	Sharon Block (R)

=== 2002–2012 ===
From 2002 to 2012, District 23 consisted of Owyhee County and a portion of Twin Falls County.

Legislature	Session	Senate	House Seat A	House Seat B
57th (2002 - 2004)	1st	Tom Gannon (R)	Frances Field (R)	Douglas Jones (R)
57th (2002 - 2004)	2nd	Tom Gannon (R)	Frances Field (R)	Douglas Jones (R)
58th (2004 - 2006)	1st	Tom Gannon (R)	Frances Field (R)	Douglas Jones (R)
58th (2004 - 2006)	2nd	Tom Gannon (R)	Frances Field (R)	Bert Brackett (R)
59th (2006 - 2008)	1st	Tom Gannon (R)	Jim Patrick (R)	Bert Brackett (R)
59th (2006 - 2008)	2nd	Tom Gannon (R)	Jim Patrick (R)	Bert Brackett (R)
60th (2008 - 2010)	1st	Bert Brackett (R)	Jim Patrick (R)	Stephen Hartgen (R)
60th (2008 - 2010)	2nd	Bert Brackett (R)	Jim Patrick (R)	Stephen Hartgen (R)
61st (2010 - 2012)	1st	Bert Brackett (R)	Jim Patrick (R)	Stephen Hartgen (R)
61st (2010 - 2012)	2nd	Bert Brackett (R)	Jim Patrick (R)	Stephen Hartgen (R)

=== 2012–2022 ===
District 23 currently consists of Elmore and Owyhee counties and a portion of Twin Falls County.

Legislature	Session	Senate	House Seat A	House Seat B
62nd (2012 - 2014)	1st	Bert Brackett (R)	Rich Wills (R)	Pete Nielsen (R)
62nd (2012 - 2014)	2nd	Bert Brackett (R)	Rich Wills (R)	Pete Nielsen (R)
63rd (2014 - 2016)	1st	Bert Brackett (R)	Rich Wills (R)	Pete Nielsen (R)
63rd (2014 - 2016)	2nd	Bert Brackett (R)	Rich Wills (R)	Pete Nielsen (R)
64th (2016 - 2018)	1st	Bert Brackett (R)	Christy Zito (R)	Megan Blanksma (R)
64th (2016 - 2018)	2nd	Bert Brackett (R)	Christy Zito (R)	Megan Blanksma (R)
65th (2018 - 2020)	1st	Bert Brackett (R)	Christy Zito (R)	Megan Blanksma (R)
65th (2018 - 2020)	2nd	Bert Brackett (R)	Christy Zito (R)	Megan Blanksma (R)
66th (2020 - 2022)	1st	Christy Zito (R)	Matt Bundy (R)	Megan Blanksma (R)
66th (2020 - 2022)	2nd	Christy Zito (R)	Matt Bundy (R)	Megan Blanksma (R)

=== 2022–present ===
Beginning in December 2022, District 23 will consist of Owyhee County and a portion of Ada and Canyon counties.

== See also ==
- List of Idaho senators
- List of Idaho representatives
