= Idaho's 31st legislative district =

American legislative district

Idaho's 31st legislative district is one of 35 districts of the Idaho Legislature. It is currently represented by Steve Bair, Republican of Blackfoot, Neil Anderson, Republican of Blackfoot, and Julie VanOrden, Republican of Pingree.

== District profile ==
=== 2012–2022 ===
District 31 currently consists of all of Bingham County.

Legislature	Session	Senate	House Seat A	House Seat B
62nd (2012 - 2014)	1st	Steve Bair (R)	Neil Anderson (R)	Julie VanOrden (R)
62nd (2012 - 2014)	2nd	Steve Bair (R)	Neil Anderson (R)	Julie VanOrden (R)
63rd (2014 - 2016)	1st	Steve Bair (R)	Neil Anderson (R)	Julie VanOrden (R)
63rd (2014 - 2016)	2nd	Steve Bair (R)	Neil Anderson (R)	Julie VanOrden (R)
64th (2016 - 2018)	1st	Steve Bair (R)	Neil Anderson (R)	Julie VanOrden (R)
64th (2016 - 2018)	2nd	Steve Bair (R)	Neil Anderson (R)	Julie VanOrden (R)
65th (2018 - 2020)	1st	Steve Bair (R)	Neil Anderson (R)	Julianne Young (R)
65th (2018 - 2020)	2nd	Steve Bair (R)	Neil Anderson (R)	Julianne Young (R)
66th (2020 - 2022)	1st	Steve Bair (R)	David Cannon (R)	Julianne Young (R)
66th (2020 - 2022)	2nd	Steve Bair (R)	David Cannon (R)	Julianne Young (R)

=== 2002–2012 ===
From 2002 to 2012, District 31 consisted of all of Bear Lake, Caribou, Franklin, and Oneida Counties and a portion of Bannock County.

Legislature	Session	Senate	House Seat A	House Seat B
57th (2002 - 2004)	1st	Robert L. Geddes (R)	Larry Bradford (R)	Eulalie Teichert Langford (R)
57th (2002 - 2004)	2nd	Robert L. Geddes (R)	Larry Bradford (R)	Eulalie Teichert Langford (R)
58th (2004 - 2006)	1st	Robert L. Geddes (R)	Larry Bradford (R)	Thomas Loertscher (R)
58th (2004 - 2006)	2nd	Robert L. Geddes (R)	Larry Bradford (R)	Thomas Loertscher (R)
59th (2006 - 2008)	1st	Robert L. Geddes (R)	Larry Bradford (R)	Thomas Loertscher (R)
59th (2006 - 2008)	2nd	Robert L. Geddes (R)	Larry Bradford (R)	Thomas Loertscher (R)
60th (2008 - 2010)	1st	Robert L. Geddes (R)	Marc Gibbs (R)	Thomas Loertscher (R)
60th (2008 - 2010)	2nd	Robert L. Geddes (R)	Marc Gibbs (R)	Thomas Loertscher (R)
61st (2010 - 2012)	1st	John Tippets (R)	Marc Gibbs (R)	Thomas Loertscher (R)
61st (2010 - 2012)	2nd	John Tippets (R)	Marc Gibbs (R)	Thomas Loertscher (R)

=== 1992–2002 ===
From 1992 to 2002, District 31 consisted of all of Butte County and portion of Bingham County.

Legislature	Session	Senate	House Seat A	House Seat B
51st (1992 - 1994)	1st	Jerry Twiggs (R)	Allan Larsen (R)	Mike Simpson (R)
51st (1992 - 1994)	2nd	Jerry Twiggs (R)	Allan Larsen (R)	Mike Simpson (R)
52nd (1994 - 1996)	1st	Jerry Twiggs (R)	Allan Larsen (R)	Mike Simpson (R)
52nd (1994 - 1996)	2nd	Jerry Twiggs (R)	Allan Larsen (R)	Mike Simpson (R)
53rd (1996 - 1998)	1st	Jerry Twiggs (R)	Dennis Lake (R)	Mike Simpson (R)
53rd (1996 - 1998)	2nd	Jerry Twiggs (R)	Dennis Lake (R)	Mike Simpson (R)
54th (1998 - 2000)	1st	Jerry Twiggs (R)	Dennis Lake (R)	Stan Williams (R)
54th (1998 - 2000)	2nd	Stan Williams (R)	Dennis Lake (R)	Thomas Moss (R)
55th (2000 - 2002)	1st	Stan Williams (R)	Dennis Lake (R)	Thomas Moss (R)
55th (2000 - 2002)	2nd	Stan Williams (R)	Dennis Lake (R)	Janet Arave Aikele (R)

== See also ==
- List of Idaho senators
- List of Idaho representatives
