= Josh Wheeler (politician) =

American politician from Idaho

Member of the Idaho House of Representatives from the 35th district
- Incumbent
- Assumed office December 1, 2022
- Preceded by: Rod Furniss

Personal details
- Party: Republican
- Spouse: Laramie Wheeler
- Children: 6
- Education: Brigham Young University (BS); Idaho State University (MBA)
- Profession: Businessman
- Website: www.wheelerforidaho.com

Joshua "Josh" Wheeler is an American politician and businessman serving as a Republican member of the Idaho House of Representatives from the 35th district (seat B). First elected in 2022, Wheeler has emphasized career and technical education, rural development, and expanding access to health care in underserved areas.

== Early life and education ==
Wheeler was born and raised in Ammon, Idaho. He graduated from Hillcrest High School. Wheeler earned a Bachelor of Science in Construction Management from Brigham Young University and later completed a Master of Business Administration (MBA) at Idaho State University.

== Business career ==
Wheeler is co-owner and executive of Wheeler Electric, a family-owned electrical contracting business. His experience as a small business operator informs his positions on regulation, workforce development, and linking educational programs to industry needs.

== Political career ==
Wheeler won election to the Idaho House of Representatives in 2022, representing District 35B, succeeding Rod Furniss. He ran for re-election in 2024. He has served on committees including the House Education Committee and House Agricultural Affairs Committee.

=== Legislation and policy initiatives ===
Wheeler has been associated with various bills and legislative debates, particularly in the fields of career & technical education (CTE) and rural health.

- House Bill 418 (2025) — An appropriation directing additional funding to the Division of Career Technical Education (CTE).
- Idaho Launch legislation (2023) — Wheeler supported legislation establishing the Idaho Launch Grant Program, designed to improve access to technical training in workforce-demand fields.
- House Bill 443 (2025, failed) — A proposed measure to incentivize private investment in CTE programs; Wheeler publicly expressed disappointment at its failure.
- House Bill 242 (2025) — A bill to offer incentives for medical preceptors to support rural placements and expand clinical training in underserved areas.
- Senate Bill 1087 (2025) — Wheeler is named as a co-sponsor; the bill requires healthcare providers to furnish one free copy of medical records upon request in certain Social Security claims contexts.

Wheeler also opposed House Bill 138 (2025), a controversial measure that could have curtailed Medicaid expansion; he argued the change would disproportionately harm rural health systems.

== Media appearances ==
Wheeler has appeared in multiple interviews and forums:

- In June 2025, he was interviewed on the Idaho Found podcast (KISU) where he discussed his background, family, and legislative priorities.
- He appeared on SVI News / The Wave radio in 2025 to provide legislative updates.
- In his 2024 re-election campaign, East Idaho News profiled Wheeler and his policy positions.

During a February 2026 session of Idaho's House Business Committee, Wheeler as the panel's acting chair allowed far-right provocateur David Pettinger, dressed in brownface, to testify despite multiple objections from other committee members. Wheeler was noted to have "smirked" at the racist display.

== Personal life ==
Wheeler is married to Dr. Laramie Wheeler, a practicing physician. They have six children. Their son Han died in 2018 from a brain tumor. Prior to his legislative service, Wheeler was elected to the Ammon City Council in 2019.
