= Lucas Cayler =

American politician (born 1980-1981)

Member of the Idaho House of Representatives from the 11th district
- Incumbent
- Assumed office December 5, 2024 Serving with Kent Marmon
- Succeeded by: Debbie Geyer (elect)

Personal details
- Born: 1980 or 1981 (age 45–46) Nampa, Idaho, U.S.
- Party: Republican

Lucas Cayler (born 1980-1981) is an American politician and former United States Navy technician who is currently serving as a Republican member of the Idaho House of Representatives, representing District 11B. He was first elected in 2024, defeating Democratic nominee Marisela Pesina with 65.4% of the vote.

== Personal life and career ==
Cayler was born in Nampa. He served in the U.S. Navy during Operation Iraqi Freedom and later became a mechanic and civilian contractor for the U.S. Army. He currently lives in Caldwell.
