= Elaine Smith (Idaho politician) =

American politician from Idaho (1946–2024)

Member of the Idaho House of Representatives
- In office January 3, 2002 – November 30, 2020
- Preceded by: Roger Chase
- Succeeded by: James Ruchti
- Constituency: 33rd district Seat B (2002); 30th district Seat B (2002–2012); 29th district Seat B (2012–2020)

Personal details
- Born: May 25, 1946 Gooding, Idaho, U.S.
- Died: December 6, 2024 (aged 78) Pocatello, Idaho, U.S.
- Party: Democratic
- Education: Idaho State University
- Website: elainesmith4house.com

Elaine E. Smith (May 25, 1946 – December 6, 2024) was an American politician who was a Democratic member of the Idaho House of Representatives. She represented District 29 in the B seat from 2012. Smith previously represented District 30 Seat B from 2002 to 2012. She served as the House Minority Caucus Chair.

== Life and career ==
Smith was born in Gooding, Idaho, on May 25, 1946. She graduated from Meridian High School and earned her bachelor's degree in education-history from Idaho State University. On December 6, 2024, Smith died at her home in Pocatello, Idaho, at the age of 78.

== Elections ==
=== House of Representatives District 29 Seat B ===
2018

Smith was unopposed for the Democratic primary.

She defeated Republican nominee Kevin James Brown and Libertarian nominee Idaho Lorax Carta with 54.0% of the vote.

2016

Smith was unopposed for the Democratic primary and the general election.

2014

Was unopposed for the Democratic primary.

She defeated Terrel "Ned" Tovey in the general election with 58.9% of the vote.

2012

Redistricted to 29B, Smith was unopposed for the Democratic primary.

She defeated Craig Cooper in the general election with 54.2% of the vote.

=== House of Representatives District 30 Seat B ===
2010

Unopposed for the May 25, 2010, Democratic primary, Smith won with 1,418 votes, and won the November 2, 2010, general election with 4,900 votes (53.0%) against Dave Bowen (R).

2008

Unopposed for the May 27, 2008, Democratic primary, Smith won with 1,500 votes, and won the November 4, 2008, general election with 8,414 votes (56.9%) against Chris Stevens (R).

2006

Unopposed for the May 23, 2006, Democratic primary, Smith won with 1,389 votes, and won the three-party November 7, 2006, general election with 6,495 votes (6206%) against Republican nominee Joshua Thompson and Vegors, running as the United Party nominee.

2004

Unopposed for the May 25, 2004, Democratic primary, Smith won with 1,379 votes, and won the three-party November 2, 2004, general election with 8,375 votes (52.7%) against Paul Yochum (R) and Vegors (NL).

2002

When District 30 B seat Republican Representative Thomas Loertscher was re-districted to District 31, Smith was unopposed for the May 28, 2002, Democratic primary, winning with 2,078 votes, and won the three-party November 5, 2002, general election with 5,947 votes (53.3%) against Republican nominee Farhana Hibbert and Natural Law Party nominee Ann Vegors.
