= Julianne Young =

American politician

Member of the Idaho House of Representatives
- In office December 1, 2018 – November 30, 2024
- Preceded by: Julie VanOrden
- Succeeded by: Ben Fuhriman
- Constituency: 31st district Seat B (2018–2022); 30th district Seat B (2022–2024)

Personal details
- Party: Republican
- Spouse: Kevin
- Children: Ten
- Education: Rick's College (AAS); Idaho State University (BS)

Julianne Young is an American politician from Idaho. Young is a former Republican member of Idaho House of Representatives from District 30 seat B.

== Early life ==
Young's father is Richard Hill. Young grew up in Moreland, Idaho. At age 7, Young's family moved to Blackfoot, Idaho. Young graduated from Snake River High School.

== Education ==
Young earned an Associate degree from Rick's College. Young earned a Bachelor's degree in education from Idaho State University.

== Career ==
Young is a former certified teacher who became a home-school educator. Young is a homemaker.

On May 15, 2018, Young won the Idaho Primary election for District 31 seat B. Young defeated incumbent Julie VanOrden with 54.1% of the vote. On November 6, 2018, Young won the election with no opponent and became a Republican member of Idaho House of Representatives for District 31 seat B.

Young is a member of Environment, Energy, and Technology Committee, Judiciary, Rules, and Administration Committee, and State Affairs Committee.

In February 2020, Young sponsored HB 509 to "forbid Idahoans from changing the gender marker on their birth certificate to match their gender identity." Young collaborated on the bill with an Alliance Defending Freedom attorney, according emails leaked in 2023. In June 2020, a federal court barred enforcement of the legislation and the state of Idaho was ordered to pay $321,224.50 in legal fees, "plus accrued interest at the rate of 2.14%" to plaintiffs in a related lawsuit.

== Personal life ==
Young's husband is Kevin Young. They have ten children. Young and her family live on a family farm in Blackfoot, Idaho.

Young is a Christian.
