= Julie Yamamoto =

American politician

Member of the Idaho House of Representatives
- In office December 1, 2020 – November 30, 2024
- Preceded by: Jarom Wagoner
- Succeeded by: Kent Marmon
- Constituency: 10th district Seat A (2020–2022); 11th district Seat A (2022–2024)

Personal details
- Born: Nampa, Idaho, U.S.
- Party: Republican
- Education: College of Idaho (BA, MA); University of Idaho (EdD)

Julie Yamamoto is an American politician and retired educator. A member of the Republican Party, she served as a member of the Idaho House of Representatives from the 11th District. She served at the helm of the House Education Committee starting in 2023.

== Early life and education ==
Yamamoto was born in Nampa, Idaho. She is of Japanese descent. She earned a Bachelor of Arts and Master of Arts from the College of Idaho and a Doctor of Education from the University of Idaho.

== Career ==
Yamamoto has worked as a teacher and school administrator. She was the chair of the Assistance League of Boise Canyon County Branch.

=== Idaho House of Representatives ===
Yamamoto defeated incumbent Jarom Wagoner in the Republican primary with 58.27% of the vote. In the 2020 general election, Yamamoto faced Democratic nominee Rebecca Yamamoto Hanson, with whom she had no familial relation. She defeated Hanson with 67.4% of the vote. Yamamoto lost her race in the 2024 Republican primary to Kent Marmon.

During her first term in office, she sat on the House Education Committee. Yamamoto was reelected in the 2022 election. In 2023, she became head of the House Education Committee.
