= Mike Kingsley =

American politician from Idaho

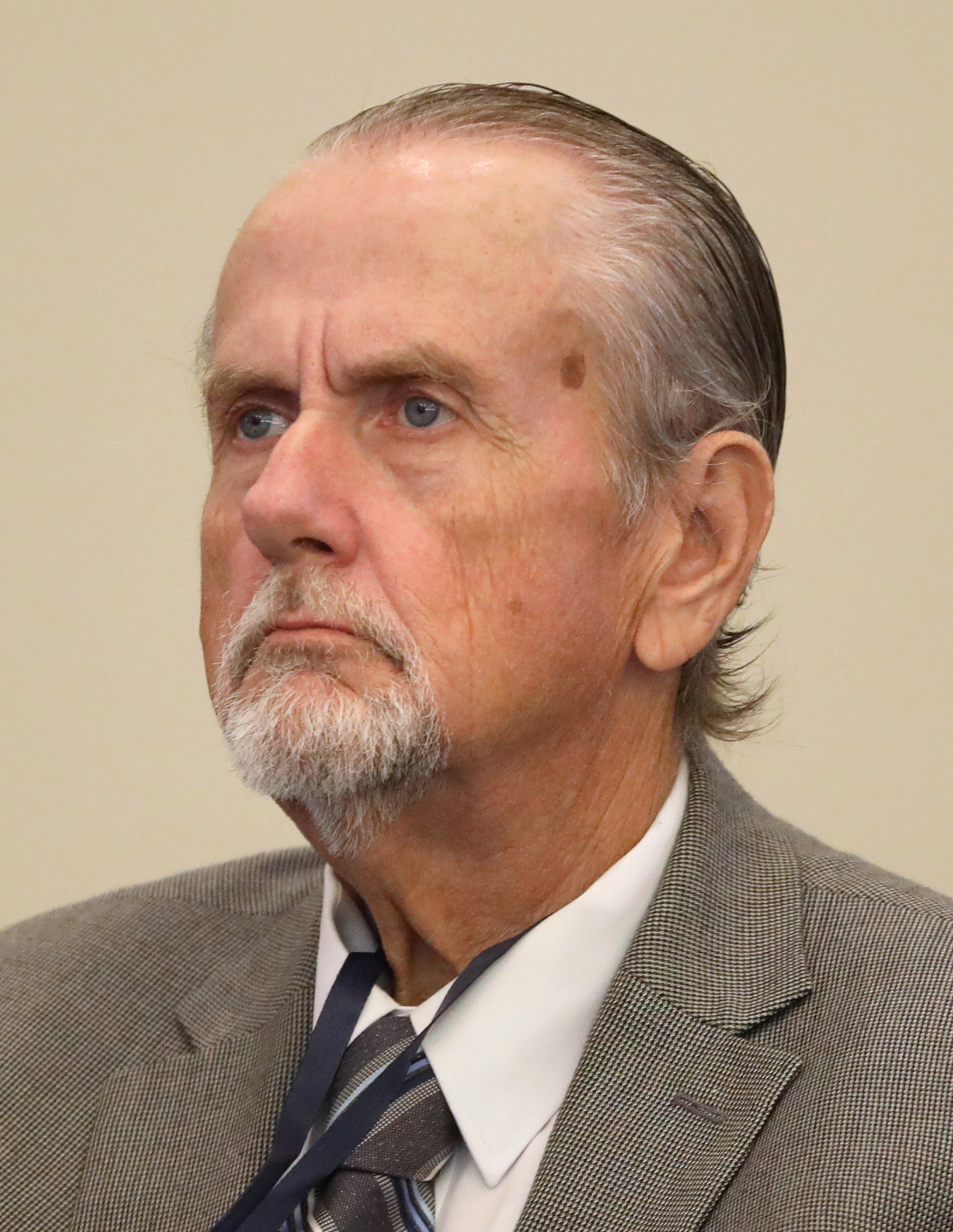

Member of the Idaho House of Representatives
- In office December 1, 2016 – November 30, 2024
- Preceded by: John Rusche
- Succeeded by: Kyle Harris
- Constituency: 6th district Seat B (2016–2022); 7th district Seat A (2022–2024)

Personal details
- Born: December 31, 1959 (age 66) Lewiston, Idaho, U.S.
- Party: Republican
- Spouse: Carolyn Ann Kingsley
- Website: www.kingsleyforidaho.com

Mike Kingsley (born December 31, 1959) is an American politician who served as a member of the Idaho House of Representatives from the 7A district. Elected in November 2016, he assumed office on December 1, 2016.

== Early life and career ==
Born in Lewiston, Idaho, Kingsley attended Lewiston High School. He earned his radio operator license from BLT Electronic Theory in 1979.

== Career ==
Kingsley was unopposed in the Republican primary for the 6B district. He rain against incumbent John Rusche in the general election, winning with 58.24% of the vote. He ran unopposed in the Republican primary for the 6B district as a write-in candidate. Kingsley lost to John Rusche in the general election by 48 votes.

Kingsley along with Bryan Zollinger launched Idaho Freedom Caucus, late in the 2017 session.

In April 2017, Freedom Caucus collaborated to challenge Governor Butch Otter Veto of the Idaho grocery tax.
