= Nate Roberts (politician) =

American politician

Member of the Idaho House of Representatives from the 29B district
- In office December 1, 2022 – November 30, 2024
- Preceded by: James Ruchti
- Succeeded by: Tanya Burgoyne

Personal details
- Born: Coos Bay, Oregon
- Party: Democratic
- Education: New Mexico Highlands University (attended)
- Occupation: Politician, electrician, union representative

Nate Roberts is an American politician, electrician, and union officer. He served as a Democratic member of the Idaho House of Representatives for legislative district 29B from 2022 to 2024.

== Professional career ==
Prior to being elected to the Idaho House of Representatives, he was an electrician for 32 years. He was also worked as an educator specializing in workforce development at the College of Southern Idaho, where he taught electricians.

He was also a union representative, and stated "represented unions at the Capitol building annually since 2018" in a 2022 interview. Prior to his election, Roberts was a member of the International Brotherhood of Electrical Workers (IBEW) union, and had previously as president of the Pocatello Central Labor Council.

== Idaho House of Representatives ==
In 2022, Roberts ran to succeed Democrat James Ruchti as the member of the House of Representatives for legislative district 29B after Ruchti chose to run for state senate. As a candidate, he emphasized affordable housing, preventing "legislative overreach from "far-right ideologies", and reproductive rights as key issues.

Roberts faced Republican candidate Jake Stevens in the general election. He ultimately won the election by a narrow margin. Roberts' margin of victory over his Republican opponent came out to less than 150 votes, making it one of the closest races of the election. After taking office, he joined the Health and Welfare, Commerce and Human Resources, and Agricultural Affairs committees.

== Personal life ==
In a 2022 interview, Roberts stated that he has been married to his wife Kirsten for 36 years, with whom he has two sons.
