= Rob Beiswenger =

American politician

Member of the Idaho House of Representatives from the 8th district
- Incumbent
- Assumed office December 5, 2024 Serving with Faye Thompson

Personal details
- Party: Republican
- Website: www.idaho4rob.com

Rob Beiswenger is an American politician who is currently serving as a Republican member of the Idaho House of Representatives, representing the 8th district.

In the 2024 Idaho House of Representatives election, he challenged Matthew Bundy in the Republican primary.

== Electoral Record ==
2024 Idaho House of Representatives election, District 8A
Party	Candidate	Votes	%
Republican	Rob Beiswenger	20,049	100
Total votes		20,049	100
