= Vito Barbieri =

American politician from Idaho

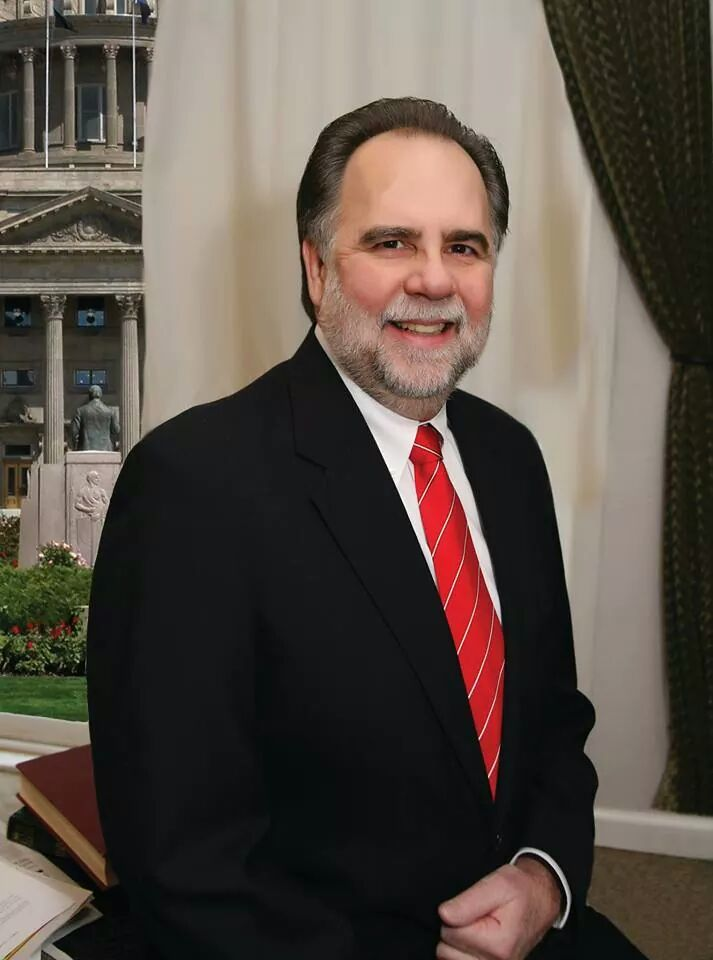

Member of the Idaho House of Representatives
- Incumbent
- Assumed office December 1, 2010 Serving with Jordan Redman
- Preceded by: Jim Clark
- Constituency: 3rd district Seat A (2010-2012); 2nd district Seat A (2012-2022); 3rd district Seat A (2022-present)

Personal details
- Born: James Vito Barbieri II; October 22, 1951 (age 74) San Antonio, Texas, U.S.
- Party: Republican
- Spouse: Joy
- Children: 3
- Education: El Camino College (AA); Western State College of Law (BS, JD)
- Website: vitobarbieri.com

James Vito Barbieri II (born October 22, 1951) is an American politician and lawyer from Idaho. He is a Republican Idaho State Representative since 2010 representing District 3 in the A seat.

== Early life, education, and career ==
Barbieri earned his associate degree from El Camino College and his bachelor's degree and J.D. from Western State College of Law.

He practiced law in California for 20 years. Since moving to Idaho in 2004, he has operated several small businessess, including a catering business and owns an electronic cigarette store in Post Falls.

== Idaho House of Representatives ==
=== Committee assignments ===
- Business Committee (chairman)
- Local Government Committee
- State Affairs Committee

Barbieri previously served on the Revenue and Taxation Committee from 2010 to 2012.

== Elections ==
District 3 House Seat A - Part of Kootenai County
| Year | Candidate | Votes | Pct | Candidate | Votes | Pct | Candidate | Votes | Pct | Candidate | Votes | Pct |
|---|---|---|---|---|---|---|---|---|---|---|---|---|
| 2010 Primary | Vito Barbieri | 2,047 | 39.4% | Duane Rasmussen | 1,298 | 25.0% | Jeri DeLange | 1,057 | 20.3% | Fred Meckel | 794 | 15.3% |
| 2010 General | Vito Barbieri | 12,168 | 100% | | | | | | | | | |

District 2 House Seat A - Part of Kootenai County
| Year | Candidate | Votes | Pct | Candidate | Votes | Pct |
|---|---|---|---|---|---|---|
| 2012 Primary | Vito Barbieri (incumbent) | 3,147 | 57.0% | Mark Fisher | 2,373 | 43.0% |
| 2012 General | Vito Barbieri (incumbent) | 14,142 | 65.7% | Cheryl Stransky | 7,371 | 34.3% |
| 2014 Primary | Vito Barbieri (incumbent) | 3,253 | 67.5% | Fritz Wiedenhoff | 1,568 | 32.5% |
| 2014 General | Vito Barbieri (incumbent) | 9,470 | 65.9% | Cheryl Stransky | 4,901 | 34.1% |
| 2016 Primary | Vito Barbieri (incumbent) | 3,250 | 67.9% | Fritz Wiedenhoff | 1,539 | 32.1% |
| 2016 General | Vito Barbieri (incumbent) | 17,115 | 72.2% | Kathy Kraack Kahn | 6,581 | 27.8% |

On November 23, 2020, Barbieri announced that he would run for Idaho House of Representatives assistant majority leader against Jason Monks.

== Controversies ==
Barbieri came to national attention on February 23, 2015, after asking a doctor giving testimony if a woman could swallow a camera in order to undergo a remote gynecological exam and received the answer that such was not possible as swallowing a pill will not lead it to the vagina. In response to commentary on social media about the seeming anatomical confusion, he explained his remarks: "I was being rhetorical, because I was trying to make the point that equalizing a colonoscopy to this particular procedure was apples and oranges... So I was asking a rhetorical question that was designed to make her say that they weren't the same thing, and she did so. It was the response I wanted."

However, upon receiving the explanation from the testifying doctor, Barbieri's response was, "Fascinating". The exchange included Barbieri's question: "Can this same procedure then be done in a pregnancy? Swallowing a camera and helping the doctor to determine what the situation is?" Dr. Julie Madsen, MD responded: "Mr. Chairman and Representative, it cannot be done in pregnancy simply because when you swallow a pill it would not end up in the vagina." Barbieri replied, "Fascinating. That certainly makes sense."
