= James Petzke =

Member of the Idaho House of Representatives from the 21A district
- Incumbent
- Assumed office December 1, 2022
- Preceded by: Steven Harris

Personal details
- Party: Republican
- Education: Boise State University (AA, BA); Harvard University (ALM)

James Petzke is an American politician and businessman. A member of the Republican Party, Petzke has served as a member of the Idaho House of Representatives for district 21A since December 1, 2022.

== Early life and education ==
Petzke was raised in Hailey, Idaho, and graduated from Wood River High School. He earned an associate degree and Bachelor of Arts degree from Boise State University and a Master of Liberal Arts in finance from the Harvard Extension School.

== Career ==
From 2008 to 2011, Petzke worked as an intern in the Blaine County School District. He joined Bodybuilding.com in 2014, working as a SEO specialist and SEO program manager before leaving the company in 2016. Petzke is the co-founder and CEO of Upland Optics, a company that produces sporting optics for hunters.

=== Idaho House of Representatives (2022-present) ===
He was elected to the Idaho House of Representatives in November 2022. Petzke is a member of the House Appropriations Committee. In the House, Petzke co-wrote Bill 92 alongside Debbie Critchfield, the superintendent of public instruction, which would mandate financial literacy classes in Idaho high schools.
