= David Cannon (Idaho politician) =

American politician

Member of the Idaho House of Representatives
- Incumbent
- Assumed office December 1, 2020 Serving with Julianne Young
- Preceded by: Neil Anderson
- Constituency: 31st district (2020–2022); 30th district (2022–present)

Personal details
- Born: Cleveland, Ohio, U.S.
- Party: Republican
- Children: 4
- Education: Brigham Young University (BA); University of Utah (JD)

David M. Cannon is an American attorney, businessman, and politician serving as a member of the Idaho House of Representatives from the 30th district. He assumed office on December 1, 2020.

== Early life and education ==
Cannon was born in Cleveland, Ohio and raised in Blackfoot, Idaho. After graduating from Blackfoot High School, Cannon earned a Bachelor of Arts degree in economics from Brigham Young University and a Juris Doctor from the S.J. Quinney College of Law at the University of Utah.

== Career ==
After graduating from law school, Cannon has worked as an attorney and operated a reclaimed wood business. Cannon was elected to the Idaho House of Representatives in November 2020 and assumed office on December 1, 2020.

== Personal life ==
Cannon and his wife, Lisa, have four children and two grandchildren.
