= Blackfoot High School =

Coordinates: 43.179°N 112.346°W

- 870 South Fisher Avenue; Blackfoot, Idaho 83221; United States

Information
- Type: Public
- Motto: Learn, Achieve, Succeed
- Established: 1894
- School district: Blackfoot S.D. (#55)
- Principal: Roger Thomas
- Grades: 9–12
- Enrollment: 1,243 (2023–2024)
- Colors: Kelly green, white
- Athletics: IHSAA Class 4A
- Athletics conference: Great Basin (East)
- Mascot: Bronco
- Rival: Snake River High School (traditional)
- Newspaper: The BroncWriter
- Yearbook: Bronco
- Feeder schools: Mountain View; Middle School
- Website: www.blackfoothigh.org

Blackfoot High School is a four-year public secondary school located in Blackfoot, Idaho, the only traditional high school in the Blackfoot School District #55 in south central Bingham County.

== History ==
Founded in the early 1890s, the current BHS building was built in the 1950s. It was given a new science wing in the mid-1990s and in the early 2000s, a new auditorium and gymnasium. The school, sitting adjacent to Stoddard Elementary, has full athletic grounds and a fine arts wing.

In July 2012, Blackfoot High School announced it would offer Shoshoni language classes.

== Athletics ==
Blackfoot competes in athletics in IHSAA Class 4A, the second-highest classification in the state. It is a member of the High Country Conference (4A) with Rigby and Bonneville. The 2012 football team successfully defended its 4A state title, the Broncos' third in four years.

=== State titles ===
Boys

- Football (4): fall (4A) 2007, 2009, 2011, 2012 (official with introduction of A-1 playoffs in fall 1979, A-2 in 1978)
  - (unofficial poll titles - 0) (poll introduced in 1963, through 1978)
- Cross Country (4): fall (A, now 5A) 1972, 1973, 1974, 1975 (introduced in 1964)
- Soccer (1): fall (4A) 2011 (introduced in 2000)
- Basketball (1): (A, now 5A) 1939
- Wrestling (4): (A-1, now 5A) 1999, 2000; (4A) 2007, 2008 (introduced in 1958)
- Baseball (1): (4A) 2015 (records not kept by IHSAA)

== Notable people ==
- Marion Jones Callister, attorney and federal judge
- David Cannon, member of the Idaho House of Representatives
- Josh Hill, NFL player
- Dustin Manwaring, member of the Idaho House of Representatives
- Luke Nelson, ski mountaineer
- Mike Simpson, congressman
