= Wendy Horman =

American politician from Idaho

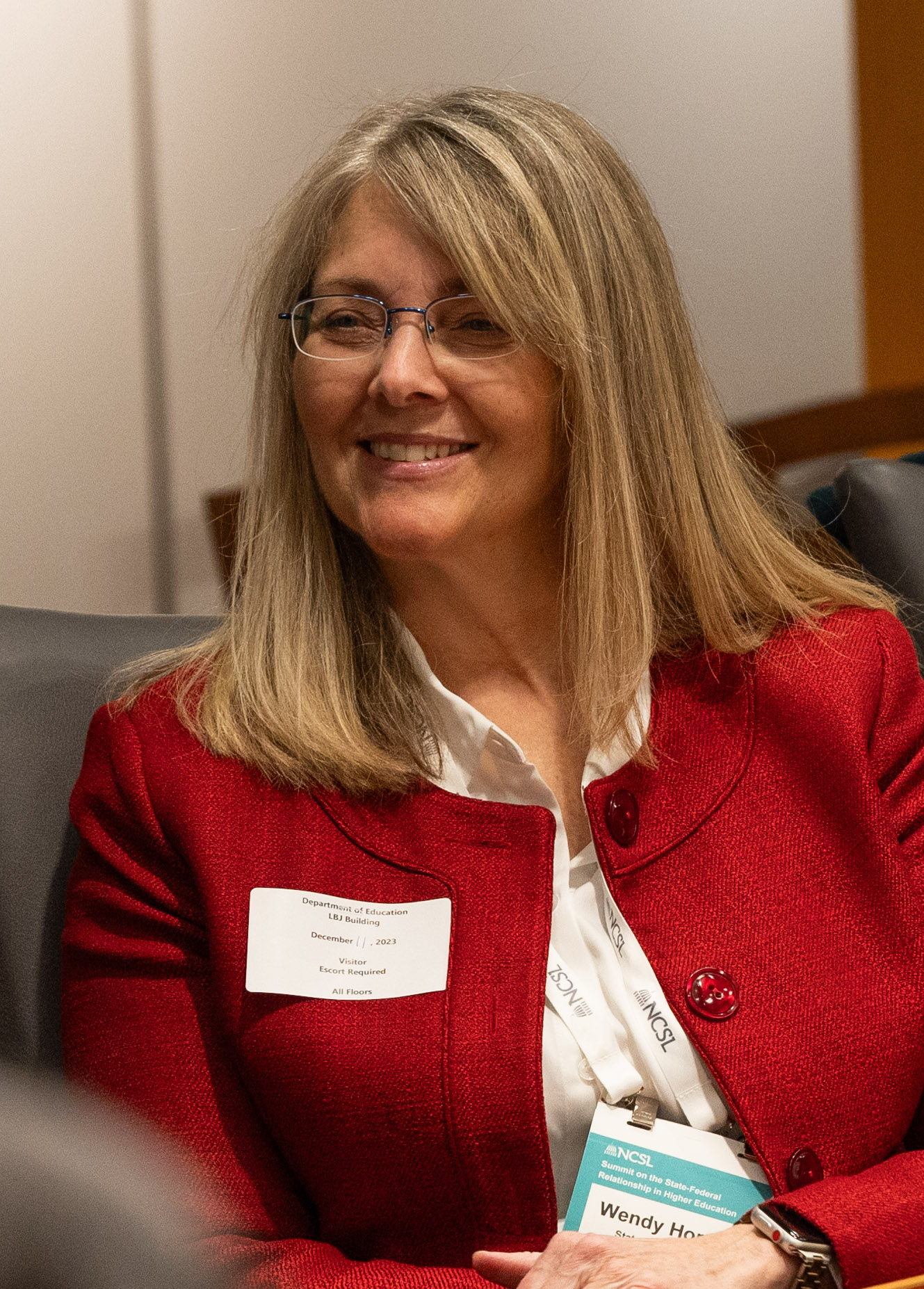

Member of the Idaho House of Representatives from the 32nd district
- In office December 1, 2012 – January 5, 2026
- Preceded by: Elaine Smith
- Succeeded by: Erin Bingham

Personal details
- Party: Republican
- Spouse: Briggs Horman
- Children: 5
- Education: Dixie State College, Brigham Young University–Idaho
- Occupation: Politician
- Website: wendyhorman.com

Wendy Horman is an American politician from Idaho. Horman is a former Republican member of Idaho House of Representatives representing District 32 in the B seat from 2012 to 2026.

== Early life ==
Horman graduated from Roy High School.

== Education ==
Horman earned an Associate degree from Dixie State College and a Bachelor of Arts in political science from Brigham Young University–Idaho.

== Career ==
In 2002, Horman became a board trustee of Bonneville Joint School District, until 2013, and she was a treasurer for seven years. In 2006, Horman became the president of the Idaho School Boards Association, until 2007.

In December 2025, Horman announced she would be resigning from her seat on January 5, 2026, to join the United States Department of Health and Human Services as the director of the Office of Child Care in the Administration for Children and Families.

== Idaho House of Representatives ==
=== Committee assignments ===
- Vice Chair - Appropriations Committee
- Environment, Energy and Technology Committee
- Joint Finance-Appropriations Committee
- Ethics Committee

Horman previously served on the Education Committee from 2013 to 2014, the Judiciary, Rules and Administration Committee from 2013 to 2014, the Commerce and Human Resources Committee and the Local Government Committee from 2013 to 2016.

Horman lost her bid for Speaker of the Idaho House of Representatives in 2020 to the incumbent; Scott Bedke.

== Election history ==
District 30 House Seat B - Part of Bonneville County
Year	Candidate	Votes	Pct	Candidate	Votes	Pct	Candidate	Votes	Pct
2012 Primary	Wendy Horman	1,834	46.5%	Stan Bell	1,103	28.0%	Greg Crockett	1,003	25.5%
2012 General	Wendy Horman	14,517	83.8%	Robert Gorgoglione	2,806	16.2%			
2014 Primary	Wendy Horman (incumbent)	4,161	100%						
2014 General	Wendy Horman (incumbent)	9,510	86.5%	Robert Gorgoglione	1,489	13.5%			
2016 Primary	Wendy Horman (incumbent)	2,502	68.2%	Randy Neal	1,169	31.8%			
2016 General	Wendy Horman (incumbent)	16,957	100%						
2018 General	Wendy Horman (incumbent)	12,862	100%						

== Awards ==
- 2017, Women of the Year. Presented by Idaho Business Review.
- 2017 Ag All Stars. Presented by Food Producers of Idaho.
- University of Virginia Darden School of Business Emerging Leader Award for Idaho.
- Bluum School Choice in Idaho Award.

== Personal life ==
She and her husband Briggs have five children and live in Ammon, Idaho.

Horman is an organ player and a member of American Guild of Organists.
