= Jim Patrick =

American politician from Idaho

Member of the Idaho Senate from the 25th district
- In office December 1, 2012 – November 30, 2022
- Preceded by: Michelle Stennett (redistricting)
- Succeeded by: Linda Wright Hartgen (redistricting)

Member of the Idaho House of Representatives from the 23rd district
- In office December 1, 2006 – November 30, 2012
- Preceded by: Frances Field
- Succeeded by: Rich Wills (redistricting)

Personal details
- Born: July 1, 1945 (age 81) Twin Falls, Idaho, U.S.
- Party: Republican
- Education: University of Idaho (BS)
- Website: votejimpatrick.com

Military service
- Branch/service: Idaho Army National Guard
- Years of service: 1968–1974

Jim Patrick (born July 1, 1945) is an American politician and farmer who served as a member of the Idaho Senate from the 25th district. He was previously a member of the Idaho House of Representatives from 2006 to 2012. He served as chairman of the Senate Commerce and Human Resources Committee.

== Education ==
Patrick graduated from Filer High School and the University of Idaho.

== Elections ==
District 23 Senate - Owyhee County and part of Twin Falls County
Year	Candidate	Votes	Pct	Candidate	Votes	Pct	Candidate	Votes	Pct
2002 Primary	Jim Patrick	1,403	39.2%	Tom Gannon	1,618	45.2%	Rex Reed	555	15.5%

District 23 House Seat A - Owyhee County and part of Twin Falls County
Year	Candidate	Votes	Pct	Candidate	Votes	Pct
2006 Primary	Jim Patrick	3,141	63.7%	Jim Conder	1,789	36.3%
2006 General	Jim Patrick	7,492	68.2%	Peter Rickards	3,499	31.8%
2008 Primary	Jim Patrick (incumbent)	3,259	100%			
2008 General	Jim Patrick (incumbent)	11,257	72.1%	Peter Rickards	4,364	27.9%
2010 Primary	Jim Patrick (incumbent)	4,003	100%			
2010 General	Jim Patrick (incumbent)	9,629	100%			

District 25 Senate - Jerome County and part of Twin Falls County
Year	Candidate	Votes	Pct	Candidate	Votes	Pct
2012 Primary	Jim Patrick	4,156	100%			
2012 General	Jim Patrick	10,650	67.1%	Scott McClure	5,214	32.9%
2014 Primary	Jim Patrick (incumbent)	3,717	100%			
2014 General	Jim Patrick (incumbent)	9,211	100%			
2016 Primary	Jim Patrick (incumbent)	4,287	100%			
2016 General	Jim Patrick (incumbent)	12,077	72.3%	Scott McClure	4,620	27.7%
