= Jordan Redman =

American politician

Member of the Idaho House of Representatives
- Incumbent
- Assumed office December 1, 2022
- Preceded by: Tony Wisniewski (redistricting)
- Constituency: 3rd district Seat B

Personal details
- Born: September 1985 (age 40) Coeur d'Alene, Idaho, U.S.
- Party: Republican
- Children: 5
- Relatives: Eric Redman (father)

Jordan R. Redman is an American politician serving as a member of the Idaho House of Representatives for the 3B district. He assumed office on December 1, 2022.

== Early life and education ==
Redman was born in Coeur d'Alene, Idaho, and graduated from Timberlake High School. He attended North Idaho College, Whitworth University, and the University of Idaho, but did not earn a degree.

== Career ==
Outside of politics, Redman works in the insurance, financial services, and real estate industries. He was elected to the Idaho House of Representatives in November 2022.
