= Steve Tanner (politician) =

American politician

Member of the Idaho House of Representatives from the 13th district
- Incumbent
- Assumed office December 5, 2024

Personal details
- Born: Honolulu, Hawaii
- Party: Republican
- Education: California State University (B.A.)
- Website: stevetanner4idaho.com

Steve C. Tanner is an American politician and former programmer who is currently serving as a Republican member of the Idaho House of Representatives from District 13B. He was first elected in 2024 unopposed.

== Personal life and career ==
Tanner was born in Honolulu and currently lives in Nampa. He graduated with a Bachelor of Arts in philosophy from California State University, Long Beach.

== Political views ==
=== Healthcare ===
Tanner was a co-sponsor of House Bill 472, which prevents businesses and government entities from denying service if someone refuses medical care, such as vaccines, for a medical condition.

=== Immigration ===
Tanner sponsored a bill in 2025 to document the immigration status of students in Idaho.
