= Dustin Manwaring =

American politician

- Manwaring in 2018

Member of the Idaho House of Representatives from the 29th district
- Incumbent
- Assumed office December 1, 2020
- Preceded by: Chris Abernathy
- Succeeded by: Mary Shea (elect)
- In office December 1, 2016 – November 30, 2018
- Preceded by: Mark Nye
- Succeeded by: Chris Abernathy

Personal details
- Born: Pocatello, Idaho, U.S.
- Party: Republican
- Education: University of Utah (BS); Drake University (JD)
- Website: Campaign

Dustin Whitney Manwaring is an American attorney and politician serving as a Republican member of the Idaho House of Representatives.

== Early life and education ==
Manwaring was raised in Blackfoot, Idaho, and graduated from Blackfoot High School. He earned a Bachelor of Science from the University of Utah and a Juris Doctor from Drake University School of Law.

== Career ==
Manwaring practices law in Pocatello, Idaho, assists clients with business and intellectual property law. Previously he worked for SkyWest Airlines and as a law clerk for the United States Attorney for the Southern District of Iowa. Manwaring has argued cases before the Idaho Supreme Court and the Bankruptcy Appellate Panel for the Ninth Circuit.

=== Idaho House of Representatives ===
After Idaho Representative Mark Nye announced his candidacy for the Idaho Senate, Manwaring subsequently announced his candidacy for the Idaho House of Representatives seat held by Nye. He was unopposed in the 2016 Republican primary and defeated Pocatello attorney David Maguire in the 2016 general election. Manwaring was the only Republican serving in Legislative District 29 from 2016 to 2018 and again from 2020 to 2022, when Manwaring won re-election for the 29th district against Chris Abernathy.

In 2017, Manwaring was nominated by the speaker of the Idaho House of Representatives to participate in NCSL's Emerging Leaders Symposium hosted at the PayPal headquarters in San Jose, California.

On January 6, 2018, Manwaring was recognized by the Idaho Young Republicans as the 2017 Elected Official of the Year.

In April 2018, Manwaring was selected to attend the State Legislative Leaders Foundation Emerging Leaders Program for up to 50 of the best and brightest state legislators from across the nation held at the University of Virginia, in partnership with the Darden School of Business.

In August 2018, Manwaring participated in political exchange program to New Zealand organized by the American Council of Young Political Leaders (ACYPL).

In June 2021, Manwaring was appointed to serve on the Workforce Development Committee of the Council of State Governments West (CSG West). On July 30, 2021, Manwaring was appointed by Governor Brad Little to serve on the State of Idaho's inaugural Cybersecurity Task Force.

In December 2022, Manwaring was elected Majority Caucus Chair in the Idaho House of Representatives.

In January 2023, Manwaring was appointed to the Idaho State Capitol Commission.

In April 2026, Manwaring was appointed to serve on the Idaho Legislature’s Rural Health Transformation Committee to make recommendations regarding investments in rural healthcare access, workforce development, and provider sustainability.

In July 2026, Manwaring was appointed co-chair of the Idaho Health Insurers Working Group, an interim legislative panel created to examine insurer practices, including claim denials, provider reimbursement, prior authorization requirements, treatment delays, and access to care.

== Elections ==
District 29 House Seat A - Part of Bannock County
Year	Candidate	Votes	Pct	Candidate	Votes	Pct
2016 Primary	Dustin Manwaring	1,414	100.0%			
2016 General	Dustin Manwaring	8,609	52.2%	David Maguire	7,884	47.8%
2018 Primary	Dustin Manwaring (incumbent)	2,331	100.0%			
2018 General	Dustin Manwaring (incumbent)	7,016	48.8%	Chris Abernathy	7,353	51.2%
2020 Primary	Dustin Manwaring	2,240	100.0%			
2020 General	Dustin Manwaring	10,181	53.8%	Chris Abernathy (incumbent)	8,753	46.2%
2022 Primary	Dustin Manwaring (incumbent)	2,800	57.88%	Craig Yadon	2,038	42.12%
2022 General	Dustin Manwaring (incumbent)	7,575	52.22%	Mary Shea	6,931	47.78%
2024 Primary	Dustin Manwaring (incumbent)	2,596	100.0%			
2024 General	Dustin Manwaring (incumbent)	12,214	55.2%	Mary Shea	9,910	44.8%
