= Idaho's 8th legislative district =

American legislative district

Idaho's 8th legislative district is one of 35 districts of the Idaho Legislature. It is currently represented by Steven Thayn, Republican of Emmett, Terry Gestrin, Republican of Donnelly, and Dorothy Moon, Republican of Stanley.

== District profile ==
=== 1992–2002 ===
From 1992 to 2002, District 8 consisted of Adams, Boise, and Valley counties and a portion of Idaho and Gem counties.

Legislature	Session	Senate	House Seat A	House Seat B
51st (1992 - 1994)	1st	Terry Haun (D)	Gayle Ann Wilde (R)	Judy Danielson (R)
51st (1992 - 1994)	2nd	Terry Haun (D)	Gayle Ann Wilde (R)	Judy Danielson (R)
52nd (1994 - 1996)	1st	Judy Danielson (R)	Gayle Ann Wilde (R)	Twila Hornbeck (R)
52nd (1994 - 1996)	2nd	Judy Danielson (R)	Gayle Ann Wilde (R)	Twila Hornbeck (R)
53rd (1996 - 1998)	1st	Judy Danielson (R)	Christian Zimmerman (R)	Twila Hornbeck (R)
53rd (1996 - 1998)	2nd	Judy Danielson (R)	Christian Zimmerman (R)	Twila Hornbeck (R)
54th (1998 - 2000)	1st	Judy Danielson (R)	Christian Zimmerman (R)	Twila Hornbeck (R)
54th (1998 - 2000)	2nd	Judy Danielson (R)	Christian Zimmerman (R)	Twila Hornbeck (R)
55th (2000 - 2002)	1st	Judy Danielson (R)	Ken Roberts (R)	Twila Hornbeck (R)
55th (2000 - 2002)	2nd	Brad Little (R)	Ken Roberts (R)	Twila Hornbeck (R)

=== 2002–2012 ===
From 2002 to 2012, District 8 consisted of Clearwater, Idaho, Lewis, and Valley counties.

Legislature	Session	Senate	House Seat A	House Seat B
57th (2002 - 2004)	1st	Skip Brandt (R)	Ken Roberts (R)	Charles Cuddy (D)
57th (2002 - 2004)	2nd	Skip Brandt (R)	Ken Roberts (R)	Charles Cuddy (D)
58th (2004 - 2006)	1st	Skip Brandt (R)	Ken Roberts (R)	Paul Shepherd (R)
58th (2004 - 2006)	2nd	Skip Brandt (R)	Ken Roberts (R)	Paul Shepherd (R)
59th (2006 - 2008)	1st	Leland G. Heinrich (R)	Ken Roberts (R)	Paul Shepherd (R)
59th (2006 - 2008)	2nd	Leland G. Heinrich (R)	Ken Roberts (R)	Paul Shepherd (R)
60th (2008 - 2010)	1st	Leland G. Heinrich (R)	Ken Roberts (R)	Paul Shepherd (R)
60th (2008 - 2010)	2nd	Leland G. Heinrich (R)	Ken Roberts (R)	Paul Shepherd (R)
61st (2010 - 2012)	1st	Sheryl Nuxoll (R)	Ken Roberts (R)	Paul Shepherd (R)
61st (2010 - 2012)	2nd	Sheryl Nuxoll (R)	Ken Roberts (R)	Paul Shepherd (R)

=== 2012–2022 ===
From 2012-2022 District 8 consisted of Boise, Custer, Gem, Lemhi, and Valley counties.

Legislature	Session	Senate	House Seat A	House Seat B
62nd (2012 - 2014)	1st	Steven Thayn (R)	Terry Gestrin (R)	Lenore Hardy Barrett (R)
62nd (2012 - 2014)	2nd	Steven Thayn (R)	Terry Gestrin (R)	Lenore Hardy Barrett (R)
63rd (2014 - 2016)	1st	Steven Thayn (R)	Terry Gestrin (R)	Merrill Beyeler (R)
63rd (2014 - 2016)	2nd	Steven Thayn (R)	Terry Gestrin (R)	Merrill Beyeler (R)
64th (2016 - 2018)	1st	Steven Thayn (R)	Terry Gestrin (R)	Dorothy Moon (R)
64th (2016 - 2018)	2nd	Steven Thayn (R)	Terry Gestrin (R)	Dorothy Moon (R)
65th (2018 - 2020)	1st	Steven Thayn (R)	Terry Gestrin (R)	Dorothy Moon (R)
65th (2018 - 2020)	2nd	Steven Thayn (R)	Terry Gestrin (R)	Dorothy Moon (R)
66th (2020 - 2022)	1st	Steven Thayn (R)	Terry Gestrin (R)	Dorothy Moon (R)
66th (2020 - 2022)	2nd	Steven Thayn (R)	Terry Gestrin (R)	Dorothy Moon (R)

=== 2022–present ===
Currently, District 8 consists of Boise, Custer, Elmore, and Valley counties.

Legislature	Session	Senate	House Seat A	House Seat B
67th (2022 - 2024)	1st	Christy Zito (R)	Rob Beiswenger (R)	Faye Thompson (R)
67th (2022 - 2024)	2nd	Christy Zito (R)	Rob Beiswenger (R)	Faye Thompson (R)

== See also ==
- List of Idaho senators
- List of Idaho representatives
