= Leon Smith (politician) =

American politician from Idaho

Member of the Idaho House of Representatives from the 24th district
- In office 1998 – 2012
- Succeeded by: Lance Clow

Personal details
- Born: Leon E. Smith Jr. May 30, 1937 (age 89) Great Bend, Kansas, United States
- Party: Republican
- Education: Kansas State University; Washburn University.
- Profession: Attorney
- Committees: Judiciary, Rules and Administration (Vice Chair); Revenue and Taxation; Transportation and Defense

Military service
- Allegiance: United States
- Branch/service: United States Army
- Years of service: 1960-1963
- Rank: First Lieutenant

Leon E. Smith Jr. (born 30 May 1937 in Great Bend, Kansas) was a member of the Idaho House of Representatives, having served from 1999 to 2013. Prior, he was mayor of Twin Falls and a prosecutor for Twin Falls County, Idaho. He holds a bachelor's degree from Kansas State University, and a law degree from Washburn University.

He and his wife Jan are the parents of three children.
