= Idaho's 29th legislative district =

American legislative district

Idaho's 29th legislative district is one of 35 districts of the Idaho Legislature. It is currently represented by Senator James Ruchti, Democrat of Pocatello, Representative Dustin Manwaring, Republican of Pocatello, and Nate Roberts, Democrat of Pocatello.

== District profile ==
=== 2012–present ===
District 29 currently consists of a portion of Bannock County.

Legislature	Session	Senate	House Seat A	House Seat B
62nd (2012–2014)	1st	Roy Lacey (D)	Carolyn Meline (D)	Elaine Smith (D)
62nd (2012–2014)	2nd	Roy Lacey (D)	Carolyn Meline (D)	Elaine Smith (D)
63rd (2014–2016)	1st	Roy Lacey (D)	Mark Nye (D)	Elaine Smith (D)
63rd (2014–2016)	2nd	Roy Lacey (D)	Mark Nye (D)	Elaine Smith (D)
64th (2016–2018)	1st	Mark Nye (D)	Dustin Manwaring (R)	Elaine Smith (D)
64th (2016–2018)	2nd	Mark Nye (D)	Dustin Manwaring (R)	Elaine Smith (D)
65th (2018–2020)	1st	Mark Nye (D)	Chris Abernathy (D)	Elaine Smith (D)
65th (2018–2020)	2nd	Mark Nye (D)	Chris Abernathy (D)	Elaine Smith (D)
66th (2020–2022)	1st	Mark Nye (D)	Dustin Manwaring (R)	James Ruchti (D)
66th (2020–2022)	2nd	Mark Nye (D)	Dustin Manwaring (R)	James Ruchti (D)

=== 2002–2012 ===
From 2002 to 2012, District 29 consisted of a portion of Bannock County.

Legislature	Session	Senate	House Seat A	House Seat B
57th (2002–2004)	1st	Bert Marley (D)	Allen Andersen (D)	Elmer Martinez (D)
57th (2002–2004)	2nd	Bert Marley (D)	Allen Andersen (D)	Elmer Martinez (D)
58th (2004–2006)	1st	Bert Marley (D)	Ken Andrus (R)	Elmer Martinez (D)
58th (2004–2006)	2nd	Bert Marley (D)	Ken Andrus (R)	Elmer Martinez (D)
59th (2006–2008)	1st	Diane Bilyeu (D)	Ken Andrus (R)	James Ruchti (D)
59th (2006–2008)	2nd	Diane Bilyeu (D)	Ken Andrus (R)	James Ruchti (D)
60th (2008–2010)	1st	Diane Bilyeu (D)	Ken Andrus (R)	James Ruchti (D)
60th (2008–2010)	2nd	Diane Bilyeu (D)	Ken Andrus (R)	James Ruchti (D)
61st (2010–2012)	1st	Diane Bilyeu (D)	Ken Andrus (R)	Jim Guthrie (R)
61st (2010–2012)	2nd	Diane Bilyeu (D)	Ken Andrus (R)	Jim Guthrie (R)

=== 1992–2002 ===
From 1992 to 2002, District 29 consisted of a portion of Bonneville County.

Legislature	Session	Senate	House Seat A	House Seat B
51st (1992–1994)	1st	John Hansen (R)	Jack Barraclough (R)	Con Mahoney (R)
51st (1992–1994)	2nd	John Hansen (R)	Jack Barraclough (R)	Con Mahoney (R)
52nd (1994–1996)	1st	John Hansen (R)	Jack Barraclough (R)	Reed Hansen (R)
52nd (1994–1996)	2nd	John Hansen (R)	Jack Barraclough (R)	Reed Hansen (R)
53rd (1996–1998)	1st	John Hansen (R)	Jack Barraclough (R)	Reed Hansen (R)
53rd (1996–1998)	2nd	John Hansen (R)	Jack Barraclough (R)	Reed Hansen (R)
54th (1998–2000)	1st	Bart Davis (R)	Jack Barraclough (R)	Reed Hansen (R)
54th (1998–2000)	2nd	Bart Davis (R)	Jack Barraclough (R)	Reed Hansen (R)
55th (2000–2002)	1st	Bart Davis (R)	Jack Barraclough (R)	Kent Higgins (R)
55th (2000–2002)	2nd	Bart Davis (R)	Jack Barraclough (R)	Kent Higgins (R)

== See also ==
- List of Idaho senators
- List of Idaho representatives
