= Idaho's 30th legislative district =

American legislative district

Idaho's 30th legislative district is one of 35 districts of the Idaho Legislature. It is currently represented by Dean Mortimer, Republican of Idaho Falls, Jeff Thompson, Republican of Idaho Falls, and Wendy Horman, Republican of Idaho Falls.

== District profile ==
=== 1992–2002 ===
From 1992 to 2002, District 30 consisted of a portion of Bonneville County.

Legislature	Session	Senate	House Seat A	House Seat B
51st (1992 - 1994)	1st	Mel Richardson (R)	Ralph Steele (R)	Thomas Loertscher (R)
51st (1992 - 1994)	2nd	Mel Richardson (R)	Ralph Steele (R)	Thomas Loertscher (R)
52nd (1994 - 1996)	1st	Mel Richardson (R)	Ralph Steele (R)	Thomas Loertscher (R)
52nd (1994 - 1996)	2nd	Mel Richardson (R)	Ralph Steele (R)	Thomas Loertscher (R)
53rd (1996 - 1998)	1st	Mel Richardson (R)	Lee Gagner (R)	Thomas Loertscher (R)
53rd (1996 - 1998)	2nd	Mel Richardson (R)	Lee Gagner (R)	Thomas Loertscher (R)
54th (1998 - 2000)	1st	Mel Richardson (R)	Lee Gagner (R)	Thomas Loertscher (R)
54th (1998 - 2000)	2nd	Mel Richardson (R)	Lee Gagner (R)	Thomas Loertscher (R)
55th (2000 - 2002)	1st	Mel Richardson (R)	Lee Gagner (R)	Thomas Loertscher (R)
55th (2000 - 2002)	2nd	Mel Richardson (R)	Lee Gagner (R)	Thomas Loertscher (R)

=== 2002–2012 ===
From 2002 to 2012, District 30 consisted of a portion of Bannock County.

Legislature	Session	Senate	House Seat A	House Seat B
57th (2002 - 2004)	1st	Edgar Malepeai (D)	Donna Boe (D)	Elaine Smith (D)
57th (2002 - 2004)	2nd	Edgar Malepeai (D)	Donna Boe (D)	Elaine Smith (D)
58th (2004 - 2006)	1st	Edgar Malepeai (D)	Donna Boe (D)	Elaine Smith (D)
58th (2004 - 2006)	2nd	Edgar Malepeai (D)	Donna Boe (D)	Elaine Smith (D)
59th (2006 - 2008)	1st	Edgar Malepeai (D)	Donna Boe (D)	Elaine Smith (D)
59th (2006 - 2008)	2nd	Edgar Malepeai (D)	Donna Boe (D)	Elaine Smith (D)
60th (2008 - 2010)	1st	Edgar Malepeai (D)	Donna Boe (D)	Elaine Smith (D)
60th (2008 - 2010)	2nd	Edgar Malepeai (D)	Donna Boe (D)	Elaine Smith (D)
61st (2010 - 2012)	1st	Edgar Malepeai (D)	Roy Lacey (D)	Elaine Smith (D)
61st (2010 - 2012)	2nd	Edgar Malepeai (D)	Roy Lacey (D)	Elaine Smith (D)

=== 2012–present ===
District 30 currently consists of a portion of Bonneville County.

Legislature	Session	Senate	House Seat A	House Seat B
62nd (2012 - 2014)	1st	Dean Mortimer (R)	Jeff Thompson (R)	Wendy Horman (R)
62nd (2012 - 2014)	2nd	Dean Mortimer (R)	Jeff Thompson (R)	Wendy Horman (R)
63rd (2014 - 2016)	1st	Dean Mortimer (R)	Jeff Thompson (R)	Wendy Horman (R)
63rd (2014 - 2016)	2nd	Dean Mortimer (R)	Jeff Thompson (R)	Wendy Horman (R)
64th (2016 - 2018)	1st	Dean Mortimer (R)	Jeff Thompson (R)	Wendy Horman (R)
64th (2016 - 2018)	2nd	Dean Mortimer (R)	Jeff Thompson (R)	Wendy Horman (R)
65th (2018 - 2020)	1st	Dean Mortimer (R)	Gary Marshall (R)	Wendy Horman (R)
65th (2018 - 2020)	2nd	Dean Mortimer (R)	Gary Marshall (R)	Wendy Horman (R)
66th (2020 - 2022)	1st	Kevin Cook (R)	Gary Marshall (R)	Wendy Horman (R)
66th (2020 - 2022)	2nd	Kevin Cook (R)	Gary Marshall (R)	Wendy Horman (R)

== See also ==
- List of Idaho senators
- List of Idaho representatives
