= 2026 Idaho House of Representatives election =

- November 3, 2026

All 70 seats in the Idaho House of Representatives 36 seats needed for a majority
	Majority party	Minority party
Leader	Mike Moyle	Ilana Rubel
Party	Republican	Democratic
Leader since	December 1, 2022	December 10, 2019
Leader's seat	10th	18th
Seats before	61	9
Seats after	56	14
Seat change	▼5	▲5
- Partisan gains and holds by 2026 Idaho house districts in the elections
Speaker of the House before election
Mike Moyle
Republican
Elected Speaker of the House
Mike Moyle
Republican

The 2026 Idaho House of Representatives election was held on November 3, 2026, alongside the Idaho Senate election and the other 2026 United States elections. Voters elected 70 members of the Idaho House of Representatives in all 35 of the U.S. state of Idaho's legislative districts to serve a two-year term.

== Predictions ==
Source	Ranking	As of
Sabato's Crystal Ball	Safe R	January 22, 2026
State Navigate	Safe R	October 20, 2026

== Results ==
Summary of the November 3, 2026 Idaho House of Representatives election results
Party	Votes	%	Seats	+/–	%
Republican Party		%	56	-5	80%
Democratic Party		%	14	+5	20%
Independent		%	0	–	0%
Constitution Party		%	0	–	0%
Libertarian Party		%	0	–	0%
Total		100.00%	70	–	100%

== Retirements ==
=== Republicans ===
1. District 6A: Lori McCann is retiring to run for state senate.
2. District 22A: John Vander Woude is retiring.
3. District 25A: Don Hall is retiring.
4. District 26B: Jack Nelsen is retiring.

=== Democrats ===
1. District 16A: Soñia Galaviz is retiring to run for state senate.

== Incumbents defeated ==
=== In primary elections ===
==== Republicans ====
1. District 1A: Mark Sauter lost renomination to Jane Sauter.
2. District 8B: Faye Thompson lost renomination to Brian Beckley.
3. District 11B: Lucas Cayler lost renomination to Debbie Geyer.
4. District 24B: Steve Miller lost renomination to Chance Requa.
5. District 25B: David Leavitt lost renomination to Cherie Vollmer.
6. District 29B: Tanya Burgoyne lost renomination to Jennifer Miles.

== Summary of results by district ==
District	Seat	Incumbent	Party	Elected Representative	Outcome
1st	A	Mark Sauter	Rep	TBD	
1st	B	Cornel Rasor	Rep	TBD	
2nd	A	Heather Scott	Rep	TBD	
2nd	B	Dale Hawkins	Rep	TBD	
3rd	A	Vito Barbieri	Rep	TBD	
3rd	B	Jordan Redman	Rep	Jordan Redman	Rep
4th	A	Joe Alfieri	Rep	TBD	
4th	B	Elaine Price	Rep	TBD	
5th	A	Ron Mendive	Rep	TBD	
5th	B	Tony Wisniewski	Rep	TBD	
6th	A	Lori McCann	Rep	TBD	
6th	B	Brandon Mitchell	Rep	TBD	
7th	A	Kyle Harris	Rep	TBD	
7th	B	Charlie Shepherd	Rep	TBD	
8th	A	Rob Beiswenger	Rep	TBD	
8th	B	Faye Thompson	Rep	TBD	
9th	A	John Shirts	Rep	John Shirts	Rep
9th	B	Judy Boyle	Rep	TBD	
10th	A	Mike Moyle	Rep	TBD	
10th	B	Bruce Skaug	Rep	TBD	
11th	A	Kent Marmon	Rep	Kent Marmon	Rep
11th	B	Lucas Cayler	Rep	TBD	
12th	A	Jeff Cornilles	Rep	TBD	
12th	B	Jaron Crane	Rep	TBD	
13th	A	Brent Crane	Rep	TBD	
13th	B	Steve Tanner	Rep	TBD	
14th	A	Ted Hill	Rep	TBD	
14th	B	Josh Tanner	Rep	TBD	
15th	A	Steve Berch	Dem	TBD	
15th	B	Dori Healey	Rep	TBD	
16th	A	Soñia Galaviz	Dem	TBD	
16th	B	Anne Henderson Haws	Dem	TBD	
17th	A	John Gannon	Dem	TBD	
17th	B	Megan Egbert	Dem	TBD	
18th	A	Ilana Rubel	Dem	Ilana Rubel	Dem
18th	B	Brooke Green	Dem	TBD	
19th	A	Monica Church	Dem	TBD	
19th	B	Chris Mathias	Dem	TBD	
20th	A	Joe Palmer	Rep	TBD	
20th	B	James Holtzclaw	Rep	TBD	
21st	A	James Petzke	Rep	TBD	
21st	B	Jeff Ehlers	Rep	TBD	
22nd	A	John Vander Woude	Rep	TBD	
22nd	B	Jason Monks	Rep	TBD	
23rd	A	Chris Bruce	Rep	TBD	
23rd	B	Shawn Dygert	Rep	TBD	
24th	A	Clint Hostetler	Rep	TBD	
24th	B	Steve Miller	Rep	TBD	
25th	A	Don Hall	Rep	TBD	
25th	B	David Leavitt	Rep		Rep
26th	A	Mike Pohanka	Rep	TBD	
26th	B	Jack Nelsen	Rep	TBD	
27th	A	Douglas Pickett	Rep	Douglas Pickett	Rep
27th	B	Clay Handy	Rep	Clay Handy	Rep
28th	A	Richard Cheatum	Rep	TBD	
28th	B	Dan Garner	Rep	TBD	
29th	A	Dustin Manwaring	Rep	TBD	
29th	B	Tanya Burgoyne	Rep	TBD	
30th	A	David Cannon	Rep	David Cannon	Rep
30th	B	Ben Fuhriman	Rep	TBD	
31st	A	Jerald Raymond	Rep	TBD	
31st	B	Rod Furniss	Rep	TBD	
32nd	A	Stephanie Mickelsen	Rep	Stephanie Mickelsen	Rep
32nd	B	Wendy Horman	Rep	TBD	
33rd	A	Barbara Ehardt	Rep	TBD	
33rd	B	Marco Erickson	Rep	TBD	
34th	A	Jon Weber	Rep	Jon Weber	Rep
34th	B	Britt Raybould	Rep	Britt Raybould	Rep
35th	A	Kevin Andrus	Rep	TBD	
35th	B	Josh Wheeler	Rep	TBD	

== District 1 ==
=== Seat A ===
Seat A of Idaho's 1st district is represented by Republican Mark Sauter, who is eligible to run for re-election but has not yet stated if he will do so.

=== Seat B ===
Seat B of Idaho's 1st district is represented by Republican Cornel Rasor, who is eligible to run for re-election but has not yet stated if he will do so.

== District 2 ==
=== Seat A ===
Seat A of Idaho's 2nd district is represented by Republican Heather Scott, who is eligible to run for re-election but has not yet stated if she will do so.

=== Seat B ===
Seat B of Idaho's 2nd district is represented by Republican Dale Hawkins, who is eligible to run for re-election but has not yet stated if he will do so.

== District 3 ==
=== Seat A ===
Seat A of Idaho's 3rd district is represented by Republican Vito Barbieri, who is eligible to run for re-election but has not yet stated if he will do so.

=== Seat B ===
Seat B of Idaho's 3rd district is represented by Republican Jordan Redman, who is eligible to run for re-election but has not yet stated if he will do so.

== District 4 ==
=== Seat A ===
Seat A of Idaho's 4th district is represented by Republican Joe Alfieri, who is eligible to run for re-election but has not yet stated if he will do so.

=== Seat B ===
Seat B of Idaho's 4th district is represented by Republican Elaine Price, who is eligible to run for re-election but has not yet stated if she will do so.

== District 5 ==
=== Seat A ===
Seat A of Idaho's 5th district is represented by Republican Ron Mendive, who is eligible to run for re-election but has not yet stated if he will do so.

=== Seat B ===
Seat B of Idaho's 5th district is represented by Republican Tony Wisniewski, who is eligible to run for re-election but has not yet stated if he will do so.

== District 6 ==
=== Seat A ===
Seat A of Idaho's 6th district is represented by Republican Lori McCann, who is eligible to run for re-election but has not yet stated if she will do so.

=== Seat B ===
Seat B of Idaho's 6th district is represented by Republican Brandon Mitchell, who is eligible to run for re-election but has not yet stated if he will do so.

== District 7 ==
=== Seat A ===
Seat A of Idaho's 7th district is represented by Republican Kyle Harris, who is eligible to run for re-election but has not yet stated if he will do so.

=== Seat B ===
Seat B of Idaho's 8th district is represented by Republican Charlie Shepherd, who is eligible to run for re-election but has not yet stated if he will do so.

== District 8 ==
=== Seat A ===
Seat A of Idaho's 8th district is represented by Republican Rob Beiswenger, who is eligible to run for re-election but has not yet stated if he will do so.

=== Seat B ===
Seat B of Idaho's 8th district is represented by Republican Faye Thompson, who is eligible to run for re-election but has not yet stated if she will do so.

== District 9 ==
=== Seat A ===
Seat A of Idaho's 9th district is represented by Republican John Shirts, who is eligible to run for re-election but has not yet stated if he will do so.

=== Seat B ===
Seat B of Idaho's 9th district is represented by Republican Judy Boyle, who is eligible to run for re-election but has not yet stated if she will do so.

== District 10 ==
=== Seat A ===
Seat A of Idaho's 10th district is represented by Republican Mike Moyle, who is eligible to run for re-election but has not yet stated if he will do so.

=== Seat B ===
Seat B of Idaho's 10th district is represented by Republican Bruce Skaug, who is eligible to run for re-election but has not yet stated if he will do so.

== District 11 ==
=== Seat A ===
Seat A of Idaho's 11th district is represented by Republican Kent Marmon, who is eligible to run for re-election but has not yet stated if he will do so.

=== Seat B ===
Seat B of Idaho's 11th district is represented by Republican Lucas Cayler, who is eligible to run for re-election but has not yet stated if he will do so.

== District 12 ==
=== Seat A ===
Seat A of Idaho's 12th district is represented by Republican Jeff Cornilles, who is eligible to run for re-election but has not yet stated if he will do so.

=== Seat B ===
Seat B of Idaho's 12th district is represented by Republican Jaron Crane, who is eligible to run for re-election but has not yet stated if he will do so.

== District 13 ==
=== Seat A ===
Seat A of Idaho's 13th is represented by Republican Brent Crane, who is eligible to run for re-election but has not yet stated if he will do so.

=== Seat B ===
Seat B of Idaho's 13th is represented by Republican Steve Tanner, who is eligible to run for re-election but has not yet stated if he will do so.

== District 14 ==
=== Seat A ===
Seat A of Idaho's 14th district is represented by Republican Ted Hill, who is eligible to run for re-election but has not yet stated if he will do so.

=== Seat B ===
Seat B of Idaho's 14th district is represented by Republican Josh Tanner, who is eligible to run for re-election but has not yet stated if he will do so.

== District 15 ==
=== Seat A ===
Seat A of Idaho's 15th district is represented by Democrat Steve Berch, who is eligible to run for re-election but has not yet stated if he will do so.

=== Seat B ===
Seat B of Idaho's 15th district is represented by Republican Dori Healey, who is eligible to run for re-election but has not yet stated if she will do so.

== District 16 ==
=== Seat A ===
Seat A of Idaho's 16th district is represented by Democrat Soñia Galaviz, who is eligible to run for re-election but has not yet stated if she will do so.

=== Seat B ===
Seat B of Idaho's 16th district is represented by Democrat Anne Henderson Haws, who is eligible to run for re-election but has not yet stated if she will do so.

== District 17 ==
=== Seat A ===
Seat A of Idaho's 17th district is represented by Democrat John Gannon, who is eligible to run for re-election and has stated he will do so.

=== Seat B ===
Seat B of Idaho's 17th district is represented by Democrat Megan Egbert, who is eligible to run for re-election but has not yet stated if she will do so.

== District 18 ==
=== Seat A ===
Seat A of Idaho's 18th district is represented by Democrat Ilana Rubel, who is eligible to run for re-election but has not yet stated if she will do so.

=== Seat B ===
Seat B of Idaho's 18th district is represented by Democrat Brooke Green, who is eligible to run for re-election but has not yet stated if she will do so.

== District 19 ==
=== Seat A ===
Seat A of Idaho's 19th district is represented by Democrat Monica Church, who is eligible to run for re-election but has not yet stated if she will do so.

=== Seat B ===
Seat B of Idaho's 19th district is represented by Democrat Chris Mathias, who is eligible to run for re-election but has not yet stated if he will do so.

== District 20 ==
=== Seat A ===
Seat A of Idaho's 20th district is represented by Republican Joe Palmer, who is eligible to run for re-election but has not yet stated if he will do so.

=== Seat B ===
Seat B of Idaho's 20th district is represented by Republican James Holtzclaw, who is eligible to run for re-election but has not yet stated if he will do so.

== District 21 ==
=== Seat A ===
Seat A of Idaho's 21st district is represented by Republican James Petzke, who is eligible to run for re-election but has not yet stated if he will do so.

=== Seat B ===
Seat B of Idaho's 21st district is represented by Republican Jeff Ehlers, who is eligible to run for re-election but has not yet stated if he will do so.

== District 22 ==
=== Seat A ===
Seat A of Idaho's 22nd district is represented by Republican John Vander Woude, who is eligible to run for re-election but has not yet stated if he will do so.

=== Seat B ===
Seat B of Idaho's 22nd district is represented by Republican Jason Monks, who is eligible to run for re-election but has not yet stated if he will do so.

== District 23 ==
=== Seat A ===
Seat A of Idaho's 23rd district is represented by Republican Chris Bruce, who is eligible to run for re-election but has not yet stated if he will do so.

=== Seat B ===
Seat B of Idaho's 23rd district is represented by Republican Shawn Dygert, who is eligible to run for re-election but has not yet stated if he will do so.

== District 24 ==
=== Seat A ===
Seat A of Idaho's 24th district is represented by Republican Clint Hostetler, who is eligible to run for re-election but has not yet stated if he will do so.

=== Seat B ===
Seat B of Idaho's 24th district is represented by Republican Steve Miller, who is eligible to run for re-election but has not yet stated if he will do so.

== District 25 ==
=== Seat A ===
Seat A of Idaho's 25th district is represented by Republican Lance Clow, who is eligible to run for re-election but has not yet stated if he will do so.

=== Seat B ===
Seat B of Idaho's 25th district is represented by Republican David Leavitt, who is eligible to run for re-election but has not yet stated if he will do so.

== District 26 ==
=== Seat A ===
Seat A of Idaho's 26th district is represented by Republican Mike Pohanka, who is eligible to run for re-election but has not yet stated if he will do so.

=== Seat B ===
Seat B of Idaho's 26th district is represented by Republican Jack Nelsen, who is eligible to run for re-election but has not yet stated if he will do so.

== District 27 ==
=== Seat A ===
Seat A of Idaho's 27th district is represented by Republican Douglas Pickett, who is eligible to run for re-election but has not yet stated if he will do so.

=== Seat B ===
Seat B of Idaho's 27th district is represented by Republican Clay Handy, who is eligible to run for re-election but has not yet stated if he will do so.

== District 28 ==
=== Seat A ===
Seat A of Idaho's 28th district is represented by Republican Richard Cheatum, who is running for re-election.

=== Seat B ===
Seat B of Idaho's 28th district is represented by Republican Dan Garner, who is eligible to run for re-election but has not yet stated if he will do so.

== District 29 ==
=== Seat A ===
Seat A of Idaho's 29th district is represented by Republican Dustin Manwaring, who is eligible to run for re-election but has not yet stated if he will do so.

=== Seat B ===
Seat B of Idaho's 29th district is represented by Republican Tanya Burgoyne, who is eligible to run for re-election but has not yet stated if she will do so.

== District 30 ==
=== Seat A ===
Seat A of Idaho's 30th district is represented by Republican David Cannon, who is eligible to run for re-election but has not yet stated if he will do so.

=== Seat B ===
Seat B of Idaho's 30th district is represented by Republican Ben Fuhriman, who is eligible to run for re-election but has not yet stated if he will do so.

== District 31 ==
=== Seat A ===
Seat A of Idaho's 31st district is represented by Republican Jerald Raymond, who is eligible to run for re-election but has not yet stated if he will do so.

=== Seat B ===
Seat B of Idaho's 31st district is represented by Republican Rod Furniss, who is eligible to run for re-election but has not yet stated if he will do so.

== District 32 ==
=== Seat A ===
Seat A of Idaho's 32nd district is represented by Republican Stephanie Mickelsen, who is eligible to run for re-election but has not yet stated if she will do so.

=== Seat B ===
Seat B of Idaho's 32nd district is represented by Republican Wendy Horman, who is eligible to run for re-election but has not yet stated if she will do so.

== District 33 ==
=== Seat A ===
Seat A of Idaho's 33rd district is represented by Republican Barbara Ehardt, who is eligible to run for re-election but has not yet stated if she will do so.

=== Seat B ===
Seat B of Idaho's 33rd district is represented by Republican Marco Erickson, who is eligible to run for re-election but has not yet stated if he will do so.

== District 34 ==
=== Seat A ===
Seat A of Idaho's 34th district is represented by Republican Jon Weber, who is eligible to run for re-election but has not yet stated if he will do so.

=== Seat B ===
Seat B of Idaho's 34th district is represented by Republican Britt Raybould, who is eligible to run for re-election but has not yet stated if she will do so.

== District 35 ==
=== Seat A ===
Seat A of Idaho's 35th district is represented by Republican Kevin Andrus, who is eligible to run for re-election but has not yet stated if he will do so.

=== Seat B ===
Seat B of Idaho's 35th district is represented by Republican Josh Wheeler, who is eligible to run for re-election but has not yet stated if he will do so.
