= 2022 Idaho House of Representatives election =

- November 8, 2022

All 70 seats in the Idaho House 36 seats needed for a majority
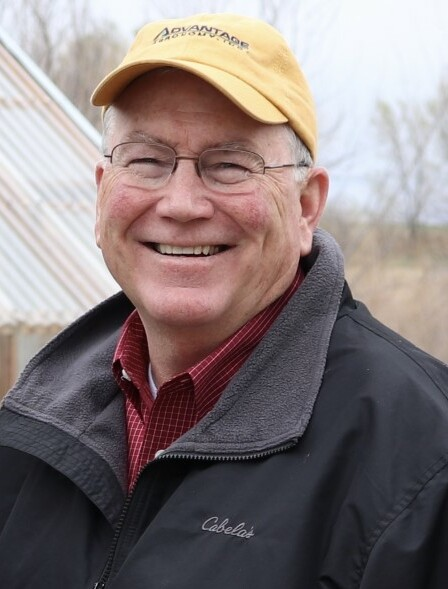

	Majority party	Minority party
Leader	Scott Bedke (retired)	Ilana Rubel
Party	Republican	Democratic
Leader since	December 5, 2012	December 10, 2019
Leader's seat	27th Oakley	18th Boise
Seats before	58, 82.9%	12, 17.1%
Seats after	59	11
Seat change	▲1	▼1
Popular vote	810,556	243,576
Percentage	76.27%	22.92%
Swing	▲4.15%	▼2.49%
- Republican gain Democratic hold Republican hold
Speaker of the House before election
Scott Bedke
Republican
Elected Speaker of the House
Mike Moyle
Republican

The 2022 Idaho House of Representatives elections took place on November 8, 2022. Primary elections were held on May 17, 2022. Idaho voters elected state representatives in all 70 seats of the House, electing two state representatives in each of the 35 Idaho state legislative districts. State representatives serve two-year terms in the Idaho House of Representatives.

The election coincided with United States national elections and Idaho state elections, including U.S. Senate, U.S. House, Governor, and Idaho Senate. Since the previous election in 2020, Republicans held a 58-to-12-seat supermajority over Democrats. Republicans gained a seat in 2022, increasing their supermajority to 59 seats.

These were the first elections in Idaho following the 2020 United States redistricting cycle, which resulted in some members being assigned to new districts.

== Swing districts ==
- Idaho's 15th legislative district
- Idaho's 26th legislative district
- Idaho's 29th legislative district

== Retirements ==
=== Republicans ===
1. District 2B: Doug Okuniewicz: Retiring to run for state senate
2. District 5B: Caroline Nilsson Troy: Retiring
3. District 7A: Priscilla Giddings: Retiring to run for Lieutenant Governor
4. District 8A: Terry Gestrin: Retiring to run for state senate
5. District 8B: Dorothy Moon: Retiring to run for Secretary of State
6. District 10B: Gregory Chaney: Retiring to run for state senate
7. District 11B: Tammy Nichols: Retiring to run for state senate
8. District 12B: Rick Youngblood: Retiring
9. District 13B: Ben Adams: Retiring to run for state senate
10. District 15B: Codi Galloway: Retiring to run for state senate
11. District 21A: Steven Harris: Retiring
12. District 24B: Linda Wright Hartgen: Retiring to run for state senate
13. District 25A: Laurie Lickley: Retiring to run for state senate
14. District 25B: Clark Kauffman: Retiring
15. District 27A: Scott Bedke: Retiring to run for lieutenant governor
16. District 27B: Fred Wood: Retiring
17. District 28A: Randy Armstrong: Retiring
18. District 30A: Gary Marshall: Retiring
19. District 32A: Marc Gibbs: Retiring

=== Democrats ===
1. District 16A: John McCrostie: Retiring
2. District 26B: Sally Toone: Retiring
3. District 29B: James Ruchti: Retiring to run for state senate

== Incumbents defeated in primaries ==
=== Republicans ===
1. District 4A: Jim Addis was defeated by Joe Alfieri.
2. District 4B: Paul Amador was defeated by Elaine Price.
3. District 9A: Ryan Kerby was defeated by Jacyn Gallagher.
4. District 9B: Scott Syme was defeated by fellow incumbent Judy Boyle in a redistricting race.
5. District 14B: Gayann DeMordaunt was defeated by Josh Tanner.
6. District 22A: Greg Ferch was defeated by fellow incumbent John Vander Woude in a redistricting race.
7. District 31A: Karey Hanks was defeated by Jerald Raymond.
8. District 34B: Ron Nate was defeated by Britt Raybould.
9. District 35B: Chad Christensen was defeated by Josh Wheeler.

== Predictions ==
Source	Ranking	As of
Sabato's Crystal Ball	Safe R	May 19, 2022

== Results ==
Summary of the November 8, 2022 Idaho House of Representatives election results
Party	Votes	%	Seats	+/–	%
Republican Party	810,556	76.27%	59	+1	84.29%
Democratic Party	243,576	22.92%	11	-1	15.71%
Constitution Party	6,451	0.61%	0	–	0%
Libertarian Party	1,124	0.10%	0	–	0%
Independent	1,039	0.10%	0	–	0%
Total	1,062,746	100.00%	70	–	

== Closest races ==
Seats where the margin of victory was under 10%:

- District 15
1. Seat A, 5.88%
2. Seat B, 5.42%
- District 26
1. Seat A, 0.24%
2. Seat B, 0.54% gain
- District 29
1. Seat A, 4.56%
2. Seat B, 0.78%

== Summary of results by House district ==
Italics denote an open seat held by the incumbent party; bold text denotes a gain for a party.

House district	Seat	Incumbent	Party	Elected Representative	Party
1	A	Heather Scott (Note: Redistricted from District 1 to District 2.)	Rep	Mark Sauter	Rep
1	B	Sage Dixon	Rep	Sage Dixon	Rep
2	A	Vito Barbieri (Note: Redistricted from District 2 to District 3.)	Rep	Heather Scott	Rep
2	B	Doug Okuniewicz (Note: Redistricted from District 2 to District 3 and won election to the Idaho Senate.)	Rep	Dale Hawkins	Rep
3	A	Ron Mendive (Note: Redistricted from District 3 to District 5.)	Rep	Vito Barbieri	Rep
3	B	Tony Wisniewski (Note: Redistricted from District 3 to District 5.)	Rep	Jordan Redman	Rep
4	A	Jim Addis	Rep	Joe Alfieri	Rep
4	B	Paul Amador	Rep	Elaine Price	Rep
5	A	Brandon Mitchell (Note: Redistricted from District 5 to District 6.)	Rep	Ron Mendive	Rep
5	B	Caroline Nilsson Troy	Rep	Tony Wisniewski	Rep
6	A	Lori McCann (Note: Representative Lori McCann was appointed to the seat after the departure of Representative Aaron von Ehlinger.)	Rep	Lori McCann	Rep
6	B	Mike Kingsley (Note: Redistricted from District 6 to District 7.)	Rep	Brandon Mitchell	Rep
7	A	Priscilla Giddings	Rep	Mike Kingsley	Rep
7	B	Charlie Shepherd	Rep	Charlie Shepherd	Rep
8	A	Terry Gestrin	Rep	Matthew Bundy (Note: Redistricted from District 23 to District 8.)	Rep
8	B	Dorothy Moon	Rep	Megan Blanksma (Note: Redistricted from District 23 to District 8.)	Rep
9	A	Ryan Kerby	Rep	Jacyn Gallagher	Rep
9	B	Judy Boyle	Rep	Judy Boyle	Rep
10	A	Julie Yamamoto (Note: Redistricted from District 10 to District 11.)	Rep	Mike Moyle (Note: Redistricted from District 14 to District 10.)	Rep
10	B	Gregory Chaney (Note: Redistricted from District 10 to District 11 and lost election to the Idaho Senate.)	Rep	Bruce Skaug (Note: Redistricted from District 12 to District 10.)	Rep
11	A	Scott Syme (Note: Redistricted from District 11 to District 9 and lost re-election.)	Rep	Julie Yamamoto	Rep
11	B	Tammy Nichols (Note: Redistricted from District 11 to District 10 and won election to the Idaho Senate.)	Rep	Chris Allgood	Rep
12	A	Bruce Skaug	Rep	Jeff Cornilles	Rep
12	B	Rick Youngblood	Rep	Jaron Crane	Rep
13	A	Brent Crane	Rep	Brent Crane	Rep
13	B	Ben Adams (Note: Redistricted from District 13 to District 12 and won election to the Idaho Senate.)	Rep	Kenny Wroten	Rep
14	A	Mike Moyle	Rep	Ted Hill	Rep
14	B	Gayann DeMordaunt	Rep	Josh Tanner	Rep
15	A	Steve Berch	Dem	Steve Berch	Dem
15	B	Codi Galloway (Note: Lost election to the Idaho Senate.)	Rep	Dori Healey	Rep
16	A	John McCrostie	Dem	Soñia Galaviz	Dem
16	B	Colin Nash	Dem	Colin Nash	Dem
17	A	John Gannon	Dem	John Gannon	Dem
17	B	Sue Chew	Dem	Sue Chew	Dem
18	A	Ilana Rubel	Dem	Ilana Rubel	Dem
18	B	Brooke Green	Dem	Brooke Green	Dem
19	A	Lauren Necochea	Dem	Lauren Necochea	Dem
19	B	Chris Mathias	Dem	Chris Mathias	Dem
20	A	Joe Palmer	Rep	Joe Palmer	Rep
20	B	James Holtzclaw	Rep	James Holtzclaw	Rep
21	A	Steven Harris	Rep	James Petzke	Rep
21	B	Greg Ferch (Note: Redistricted from District 21 to District 22 and lost re-election.)	Rep	Jeff Ehlers	Rep
22	A	John Vander Woude	Rep	John Vander Woude	Rep
22	B	Jason Monks	Rep	Jason Monks	Rep
23	A	Matthew Bundy	Rep	Melissa Durrant	Rep
23	B	Megan Blanksma	Rep	Tina Lambert	Rep
24	A	Lance Clow (Note: Redistricted from District 24 to District 25.)	Rep	Chenele Dixon	Rep
24	B	Linda Wright Hartgen (Note: Redistricted from District 24 to District 25 and won election to the Idaho Senate.)	Rep	Steve Miller	Rep
25	A	Laurie Lickley (Note: Redistricted from District 25 to District 26 and lost election to the Idaho Senate.)	Rep	Lance Clow	Rep
25	B	Clark Kauffman	Rep	Gregory Lanting	Rep
26	A	Ned Burns (Note: Representative Ned Burns was appointed to the seat after the departure of Representative Muffy Davis.)	Dem	Ned Burns	Dem
26	B	Sally Toone	Dem	**Jack Nelsen**	**Rep**
27	A	Scott Bedke	Rep	Douglas Pickett	Rep
27	B	Fred Wood	Rep	Clay Handy	Rep
28	A	Randy Armstrong	Rep	Richard Cheatum	Rep
28	B	Kevin Andrus (Note: Redistricted from District 28 to District 35.)	Rep	Dan Garner	Rep
29	A	Dustin Manwaring	Rep	Dustin Manwaring	Rep
29	B	James Ruchti (Note: Won election to the Idaho Senate.)	Dem	Nate Roberts	Dem
30	A	Gary Marshall	Rep	David Cannon (Note: Redistricted from District 31 to District 30.)	Rep
30	B	Wendy Horman (Note: Redistricted from District 30 to District 32.)	Rep	Julianne Young (Note: Redistricted from District 31 to District 30.)	Rep
31	A	David Cannon	Rep	Jerald Raymond	Rep
31	B	Julianne Young	Rep	Rod Furniss (Note: Redistricted from District 35 to District 31.)	Rep
32	A	Marc Gibbs	Rep	Stephanie Mickelsen	Rep
32	B	Chad Christensen (Note: Redistricted from District 32 to District 35 but lost re-election.)	Rep	Wendy Horman	Rep
33	A	Barbara Ehardt	Rep	Barbara Ehardt	Rep
33	B	Marco Erickson	Rep	Marco Erickson	Rep
34	A	Jon Weber	Rep	Jon Weber	Rep
34	B	Ronald M. Nate	Rep	Britt Raybould	Rep
35	A	Karey Hanks (Note: Redistricted from District 35 to District 31 but lost re-election.)	Rep	Kevin Andrus	Rep
35	B	Rod Furniss	Rep	Josh Wheeler	Rep

== Detailed Results by House District ==
Sources for election results:

=== District 1 ===
Seat A

Idaho Legislative District 1 House Seat A Republican Primary Election, 2022
Party	Candidate	Votes	%
Idaho Republican Party	Mark Sauter	4,816	38.25%
Idaho Republican Party	Spencer Hutchings	4,093	32.51%
Idaho Republican Party	Travis Thompson	1,929	15.32%
Idaho Republican Party	Cynthia P. Weiss	1,004	7.97%
Idaho Republican Party	Adam Rorick	749	5.95%
Total votes		12,591	100.00%

Idaho Legislative District 1 House Seat A Democratic Primary Election, 2022
Party	Candidate	Votes	%
Democratic	Steve R. Johnson (Note: After winning the Democratic Party nomination, Johnson withdrew from the election and mounted an unsuccessful write-in campaign for State Senate.)	1,118	100.00%
Total votes		1,118	100.00%

Idaho Legislative District 1 House Seat A General Election, 2022
Party	Candidate	Votes	%
Idaho Republican Party	Mark Sauter	18,434	100.00%
Total votes		18,434	100.00%
Idaho Republican Party hold			

Seat B

Idaho Legislative District 1 House Seat B Republican Primary Election, 2022
Party	Candidate	Votes	%
Idaho Republican Party	Sage G. Dixon (incumbent)	7,049	52.28%
Idaho Republican Party	Todd Engel	6,435	47.72%
Total votes		13,484	100.00%

Idaho Legislative District 1 House Seat B General Election, 2022
Party	Candidate	Votes	%
Idaho Republican Party	Sage G. Dixon (incumbent)	17,501	100.00%
Total votes		17,501	100.00%
Idaho Republican Party hold			

=== District 2 ===
Seat A

Idaho Legislative District 2 House Seat A Republican Primary Election, 2022
Party	Candidate	Votes	%
Idaho Republican Party	Heather Scott (incumbent)	8,508	100.00%
Total votes		8,508	100.00%

Idaho Legislative District 2 House Seat A General Election, 2022
Party	Candidate	Votes	%
Idaho Republican Party	Heather Scott (incumbent)	16,901	100.00%
Total votes		16,901	100.00%
Idaho Republican Party hold			

Seat B

Idaho Legislative District 2 House Seat B Republican Primary Election, 2022
Party	Candidate	Votes	%
Idaho Republican Party	Dale Hawkins	8,270	100.00%
Total votes		8,270	100.00%

Idaho Legislative District 2 House Seat B Democratic Primary Election, 2022
Party	Candidate	Votes	%
Democratic	Tom Stroschein	1,154	100.00%
Total votes		1,154	100.00%

Idaho Legislative District 2 House Seat B Libertarian Primary Election, 2022
Party	Candidate	Votes	%
Libertarian	Jennifer Ann Luoma	37	100.00%
Total votes		37	100.00%

Idaho Legislative District 2 House Seat B General Election, 2022
Party	Candidate	Votes	%
Idaho Republican Party	Dale Hawkins	15,537	78.51%
Democratic	Tom Stroschein	3,633	18.36%
Libertarian	Jennifer Ann Luoma	621	3.14%
Total votes		19,791	100.00%
Idaho Republican Party hold			

=== District 3 ===
Seat A

Idaho Legislative District 3 House Seat A Republican Primary Election, 2022
Party	Candidate	Votes	%
Idaho Republican Party	Vito Barbieri (incumbent)	9,361	100.00%
Total votes		9,361	100.00%

Idaho Legislative District 3 House Seat A General Election, 2022
Party	Candidate	Votes	%
Idaho Republican Party	Vito Barbieri (incumbent)	17,287	100.00%
Total votes		17,287	100.00%
Idaho Republican Party hold			

Seat B

Idaho Legislative District 3 House Seat B Republican Primary Election, 2022
Party	Candidate	Votes	%
Idaho Republican Party	Jordan Redman	8,445	83.23%
Idaho Republican Party	Rick Small	1,701	16.77%
Total votes		10,146	100.00%

Idaho Legislative District 3 House Seat B General Election, 2022
Party	Candidate	Votes	%
Idaho Republican Party	Jordan Redman	17,464	100.00%
Total votes		17,464	100.00%
Idaho Republican Party hold			

=== District 4 ===
Seat A

Idaho Legislative District 4 House Seat A Republican Primary Election, 2022
Party	Candidate	Votes	%
Idaho Republican Party	Joe Alfieri	4,062	52.21%
Idaho Republican Party	Jim Addis (incumbent)	3,718	47.79%
Total votes		7,780	100.00%

Idaho Legislative District 4 House Seat A Democratic Primary Election, 2022
Party	Candidate	Votes	%
Democratic	Megan Dardis-Kunz	1,210	100.00%
Total votes		1,210	100.00%

Idaho Legislative District 4 House Seat A General Election, 2022
Party	Candidate	Votes	%
Idaho Republican Party	Joe Alfieri	10,573	63.61%
Democratic	Megan Dardis-Kunz	6,048	36.39%
Total votes		16,621	100.00%
Idaho Republican Party hold			

Seat B

Idaho Legislative District 4 House Seat B Republican Primary Election, 2022
Party	Candidate	Votes	%
Idaho Republican Party	Elaine Price	4,028	51.40%
Idaho Republican Party	Paul Amador (incumbent)	3,808	48.60%
Total votes		7,836	100.00%

Idaho Legislative District 4 House Seat B Democratic Primary Election, 2022
Party	Candidate	Votes	%
Democratic	Larry Bieber	1,208	100.00%
Total votes		1,208	100.00%

Idaho Legislative District 4 House Seat B General Election, 2022
Party	Candidate	Votes	%
Idaho Republican Party	Elaine Price	10,293	61.32%
Democratic	Larry Bieber	6,493	38.68%
Total votes		16,786	100.00%
Idaho Republican Party hold			

=== District 5 ===
Seat A

Idaho Legislative District 5 House Seat A Republican Primary Election, 2022
Party	Candidate	Votes	%
Idaho Republican Party	Ron Mendive (incumbent)	6,770	83.38%
Idaho Republican Party	Cheri Zao	1,349	16.62%
Total votes		8,119	100.00%

Idaho Legislative District 5 House Seat A Democratic Primary Election, 2022
Party	Candidate	Votes	%
Democratic	Kristy Reed Johnson	807	100.00%
Total votes		807	100.00%

Idaho Legislative District 5 House Seat A General Election, 2022
Party	Candidate	Votes	%
Idaho Republican Party	Ron Mendive (incumbent)	13,527	78.54%
Democratic	Kristy Reed Johnson	3,696	21.46%
Total votes		17,223	100.00%
Idaho Republican Party hold			

Seat B

Idaho Legislative District 5 House Seat B Republican Primary Election, 2022
Party	Candidate	Votes	%
Idaho Republican Party	Tony Wisniewski (incumbent)	7,467	100.00%
Total votes		7,467	100.00%

Idaho Legislative District 5 House Seat B Democratic Primary Election, 2022
Party	Candidate	Votes	%
Democratic	Teresa Borrenpohl	804	100.00%
Total votes		804	100.00%

Idaho Legislative District 5 House Seat B General Election, 2022
Party	Candidate	Votes	%
Idaho Republican Party	Tony Wisniewski (incumbent)	13,597	78.91%
Democratic	Teresa Borrenpohl	3,633	21.09%
Total votes		17,230	100.00%
Idaho Republican Party hold			

=== District 6 ===
Seat A

Idaho Legislative District 6 House Seat A Republican Primary Election, 2022
Party	Candidate	Votes	%
Idaho Republican Party	Lori McCann (incumbent)	3,749	61.12%
Idaho Republican Party	Claudia Dalby	2,385	38.88%
Total votes		6,134	100.00%

Idaho Legislative District 6 House Seat A Democratic Primary Election, 2022
Party	Candidate	Votes	%
Democratic	Jamal Kingsley Lyksett (Note: After winning the Democratic Party nomination, Jamal Kingsley Lyksett withdrew from the election and was replaced on the ballot by Trish Carter-Goodheart.)	1,714	100.00%
Total votes		1,714	100.00%

Idaho Legislative District 6 House Seat A General Election, 2022
Party	Candidate	Votes	%
Idaho Republican Party	Lori McCann (incumbent)	11,982	59.49%
Democratic	Trish Carter-Goodheart	8,158	40.51%
Total votes		20,140	100.00%
Idaho Republican Party hold			

Seat B

Idaho Legislative District 6 House Seat B Republican Primary Election, 2022
Party	Candidate	Votes	%
Idaho Republican Party	Brandon Mitchell (incumbent)	5,162	100.00%
Total votes		5,162	100.00%

Idaho Legislative District 6 House Seat B Democratic Primary Election, 2022
Party	Candidate	Votes	%
Democratic	Tim Gresback	1,754	100.00%
Total votes		1,754	100.00%

Idaho Legislative District 6 House Seat B General Election, 2022
Party	Candidate	Votes	%
Idaho Republican Party	Brandon Mitchell (incumbent)	11,318	55.83%
Democratic	Tim Gresback	8,954	44.17%
Total votes		20,272	100.00%
Idaho Republican Party hold			

=== District 7 ===
Seat A

Idaho Legislative District 7 House Seat A Republican Primary Election, 2022
Party	Candidate	Votes	%
Idaho Republican Party	Mike Kingsley (incumbent)	6,142	72.89%
Idaho Republican Party	Lynn Guyer	2,284	27.11%
Total votes		8,426	100.00%

Idaho Legislative District 7 House Seat A General Election, 2022
Party	Candidate	Votes	%
Idaho Republican Party	Mike Kingsley (incumbent)	15,509	100.00%
Total votes		15,509	100.00%
Idaho Republican Party hold			

Seat B

Idaho Legislative District 7 House Seat B Republican Primary Election, 2022
Party	Candidate	Votes	%
Idaho Republican Party	Charlie Shepherd (incumbent)	6,912	100.00%
Total votes		6,912	100.00%

Idaho Legislative District 7 House Seat B General Election, 2022
Party	Candidate	Votes	%
Idaho Republican Party	Charlie Shepherd (incumbent)	15,499	100.00%
Total votes		15,499	100.00%
Idaho Republican Party hold			

=== District 8 ===
Seat A

Idaho Legislative District 8 House Seat A Republican Primary Election, 2022
Party	Candidate	Votes	%
Idaho Republican Party	Matthew "Matt" Bundy (incumbent)	4,715	53.29%
Idaho Republican Party	Rob Beiswenger	4,133	46.71%
Total votes		8,848	100.00%

Idaho Legislative District 8 House Seat A Constitution Primary Election, 2022
Party	Candidate	Votes	%
Constitution	Steven W. Feil	18	100.00%
Total votes		18	100.00%

Idaho Legislative District 8 House Seat A General Election, 2022
Party	Candidate	Votes	%
Idaho Republican Party	Matthew "Matt" Bundy (incumbent)	12,160	79.75%
Constitution	Steven W. Feil	3,088	20.25%
Total votes		15,248	100.00%
Idaho Republican Party hold			

Seat B

Idaho Legislative District 8 House Seat B Republican Primary Election, 2022
Party	Candidate	Votes	%
Idaho Republican Party	Megan C. Blanksma (incumbent)	6,995	100.00%
Total votes		6,995	100.00%

Idaho Legislative District 8 House Seat B Constitution Primary Election, 2022
Party	Candidate	Votes	%
Constitution	Tony Ullrich	22	100.00%
Total votes		22	100.00%

Idaho Legislative District 8 House Seat B General Election, 2022
Party	Candidate	Votes	%
Idaho Republican Party	Megan C. Blanksma (incumbent)	12,604	83.55%
Constitution	Tony Ullrich	2,482	16.45%
Total votes		15,086	100.00%
Idaho Republican Party hold			

=== District 9 ===
Seat A

Idaho Legislative District 9 House Seat A Republican Primary Election, 2022
Party	Candidate	Votes	%
Idaho Republican Party	Jacyn Gallagher	4,642	51.10%
Idaho Republican Party	Ryan Kerby (incumbent)	4,442	48.90%
Total votes		9,084	100.00%

Idaho Legislative District 9 House Seat A General Election, 2022
Party	Candidate	Votes	%
Idaho Republican Party	Jacyn Gallagher	14,621	100.00%
Total votes		14,621	100.00%
Idaho Republican Party hold			

Seat B

Idaho Legislative District 9 House Seat B Republican Primary Election, 2022
Party	Candidate	Votes	%
Idaho Republican Party	Judy Boyle (incumbent)	4,636	50.03%
Idaho Republican Party	Scott Syme (incumbent)	4,630	49.97%
Total votes		9,266	100.00%

Idaho Legislative District 9 House Seat B General Election, 2022
Party	Candidate	Votes	%
Idaho Republican Party	Judy Boyle (incumbent)	14,274	100.00%
Total votes		14,274	100.00%
Idaho Republican Party hold			

=== District 10 ===
Seat A

Idaho Legislative District 10 House Seat A Republican Primary Election, 2022
Party	Candidate	Votes	%
Idaho Republican Party	Mike Moyle (incumbent)	4,957	56.05%
Idaho Republican Party	Rachel Hazelip	3,887	43.95%
Total votes		8,844	100.00%

Idaho Legislative District 10 House Seat A General Election, 2022
Party	Candidate	Votes	%
Idaho Republican Party	Mike Moyle (incumbent)	16,998	100.00%
Total votes		16,998	100.00%
Idaho Republican Party hold			

Seat B

Idaho Legislative District 10 House Seat B Republican Primary Election, 2022
Party	Candidate	Votes	%
Idaho Republican Party	Bruce D. Skaug (incumbent)	6,200	74.40%
Idaho Republican Party	Beverlee Furner	1,327	15.92%
Idaho Republican Party	Coral Kenagy	806	9.67%
Total votes		8,333	100.00%

Idaho Legislative District 10 House Seat B General Election, 2022
Party	Candidate	Votes	%
Idaho Republican Party	Bruce D. Skaug (incumbent)	16,950	100.00%
Total votes		16,950	100.00%
Idaho Republican Party hold			

=== District 11 ===
Seat A

Idaho Legislative District 11 House Seat A Republican Primary Election, 2022
Party	Candidate	Votes	%
Idaho Republican Party	Julie K. Yamamoto (incumbent)	3,113	100.00%
Total votes		3,113	100.00%

Idaho Legislative District 11 House Seat A Democratic Primary Election, 2022
Party	Candidate	Votes	%
Democratic	Robert Scoville	523	100.00%
Total votes		523	100.00%

Idaho Legislative District 11 House Seat A General Election, 2022
Party	Candidate	Votes	%
Idaho Republican Party	Julie K. Yamamoto (incumbent)	6,820	70.69%
Democratic	Robert Scoville	2,828	29.31%
Total votes		9,648	100.00%
Idaho Republican Party hold			

Seat B

Idaho Legislative District 11 House Seat B Republican Primary Election, 2022
Party	Candidate	Votes	%
Idaho Republican Party	Chris Allgood	1,522	44.62%
Idaho Republican Party	Kent A. Marmon	1,062	31.13%
Idaho Republican Party	Mike Miller	827	24.25%
Total votes		3,411	100.00%

Idaho Legislative District 11 House Seat B Democratic Primary Election, 2022
Party	Candidate	Votes	%
Democratic	Marisela Pesina	525	100.00%
Total votes		525	100.00%

Idaho Legislative District 11 House Seat B General Election, 2022
Party	Candidate	Votes	%
Idaho Republican Party	Chris Allgood	6,456	67.34%
Democratic	Marisela Pesina	3,131	32.66%
Total votes		9,587	100.00%
Idaho Republican Party hold			

=== District 12 ===
Seat A

Idaho Legislative District 12 House Seat A Republican Primary Election, 2022
Party	Candidate	Votes	%
Idaho Republican Party	Jeff Cornilles	1,997	35.24%
Idaho Republican Party	Machele Hamilton	1,923	33.93%
Idaho Republican Party	Sebastian Griffin	1,747	30.83%
Total votes		5,667	100.00%

Idaho Legislative District 12 House Seat A General Election, 2022
Party	Candidate	Votes	%
Idaho Republican Party	Jeff Cornilles	10,053	100.00%
Total votes		10,053	100.00%
Idaho Republican Party hold			

Seat B

Idaho Legislative District 12 House Seat B Republican Primary Election, 2022
Party	Candidate	Votes	%
Idaho Republican Party	Jaron Crane	4,066	75.75%
Idaho Republican Party	Jana M. Warner	1,302	24.25%
Total votes		5,368	100.00%

Idaho Legislative District 12 House Seat B General Election, 2022
Party	Candidate	Votes	%
Idaho Republican Party	Jaron Crane	9,960	100.00%
Total votes		9,960	100.00%
Idaho Republican Party hold			

=== District 13 ===
Seat A

Idaho Legislative District 13 House Seat A Republican Primary Election, 2022
Party	Candidate	Votes	%
Idaho Republican Party	Brent J. Crane (incumbent)	4,939	100.00%
Total votes		4,939	100.00%

Idaho Legislative District 13 House Seat A Constitution Primary Election, 2022
Party	Candidate	Votes	%
Constitution	Petre Danaila	12	100.00%
Total votes		12	100.00%

Idaho Legislative District 13 House Seat A General Election, 2022
Party	Candidate	Votes	%
Idaho Republican Party	Brent J. Crane (incumbent)	9,476	86.16%
Constitution	Petre Danaila	1,522	13.84%
Total votes		10,998	100.00%
Idaho Republican Party hold			

Seat B

Idaho Legislative District 13 House Seat B Republican Primary Election, 2022
Party	Candidate	Votes	%
Idaho Republican Party	Kenny Wroten	2,475	46.55%
Idaho Republican Party	Roger Hunt	1,852	34.83%
Idaho Republican Party	Tara Barling	990	18.62%
Total votes		5,317	100.00%

Idaho Legislative District 13 House Seat B General Election, 2022
Party	Candidate	Votes	%
Idaho Republican Party	Kenny Wroten	10,113	100.00%
Total votes		10,113	100.00%
Idaho Republican Party hold			

=== District 14 ===
Seat A

Idaho Legislative District 14 House Seat A Republican Primary Election, 2022
Party	Candidate	Votes	%
Idaho Republican Party	Ted Hill	5,221	42.43%
Idaho Republican Party	Tracey L. Koellisch	3,702	30.09%
Idaho Republican Party	Mike Olsen	2,134	17.34%
Idaho Republican Party	Caleb Hoobery	1,247	10.13%
Total votes		12,304	100.00%

Idaho Legislative District 14 House Seat A Democratic Primary Election, 2022
Party	Candidate	Votes	%
Democratic	Crystal Ivie	842	100.00%
Total votes		842	100.00%

Idaho Legislative District 14 House Seat A General Election, 2022
Party	Candidate	Votes	%
Idaho Republican Party	Ted Hill	18,522	75.78%
Democratic	Crystal Ivie	5,919	24.22%
Total votes		24,441	100.00%
Idaho Republican Party hold			

Seat B

Idaho Legislative District 14 House Seat B Republican Primary Election, 2022
Party	Candidate	Votes	%
Idaho Republican Party	Josh Tanner	6,745	55.43%
Idaho Republican Party	Gayann DeMordaunt (incumbent)	5,424	44.57%
Total votes		12,169	100.00%

Idaho Legislative District 14 House Seat B Democratic Primary Election, 2022
Party	Candidate	Votes	%
Democratic	Shelley Brock	862	100.00%
Total votes		862	100.00%

Idaho Legislative District 14 House Seat B General Election, 2022
Party	Candidate	Votes	%
Idaho Republican Party	Josh Tanner	18,210	74.32%
Democratic	Shelley Brock	6,293	25.68%
Total votes		24,503	100.00%
Idaho Republican Party hold			

=== District 15 ===
Seat A

Idaho Legislative District 15 House Seat A Democratic Primary Election, 2022
Party	Candidate	Votes	%
Democratic	Steve Berch (incumbent)	1,543	100.00%
Total votes		1,543	100.00%

Idaho Legislative District 15 House Seat A Republican Primary Election, 2022
Party	Candidate	Votes	%
Idaho Republican Party	Steve Keyser	5,242	100.00%
Total votes		5,242	100.00%

Idaho Legislative District 15 House Seat A General Election, 2022
Party	Candidate	Votes	%
Democratic	Steve Berch (incumbent)	9,739	52.94%
Idaho Republican Party	Steve Keyser	8,656	47.06%
Total votes		18,395	100.00%
Democratic hold			

Seat B

Idaho Legislative District 15 House Seat B Republican Primary Election, 2022
Party	Candidate	Votes	%
Idaho Republican Party	Dori Healey	5,194	100.00%
Total votes		5,194	100.00%

Idaho Legislative District 15 House Seat B Democratic Primary Election, 2022
Party	Candidate	Votes	%
Democratic	Jeff Nafsinger	1,449	100.00%
Total votes		1,449	100.00%

Idaho Legislative District 15 House Seat B General Election, 2022
Party	Candidate	Votes	%
Idaho Republican Party	Dori Healey	9,632	52.71%
Democratic	Jeff Nafsinger	8,643	47.29%
Total votes		18,275	100.00%
Idaho Republican Party hold			

=== District 16 ===
Seat A

Idaho Legislative District 16 House Seat A Democratic Primary Election, 2022
Party	Candidate	Votes	%
Democratic	Soñia Galaviz	1,803	100.00%
Total votes		1,803	100.00%

Idaho Legislative District 16 House Seat A Republican Primary Election, 2022
Party	Candidate	Votes	%
Idaho Republican Party	Mark A. Montoya	3,855	100.00%
Total votes		3,855	100.00%

Idaho Legislative District 16 House Seat A General Election, 2022
Party	Candidate	Votes	%
Democratic	Soñia Galaviz	10,118	57.35%
Idaho Republican Party	Mark A. Montoya	6,487	36.77%
Independent	Wayne Richey	1,039	5.89%
Total votes		17,644	100.00%
Democratic hold			

Seat B

Idaho Legislative District 16 House Seat B Democratic Primary Election, 2022
Party	Candidate	Votes	%
Democratic	Colin Nash (incumbent)	1,831	100.00%
Total votes		1,831	100.00%

Idaho Legislative District 16 House Seat B Republican Primary Election, 2022
Party	Candidate	Votes	%
Idaho Republican Party	Jackie Davidson	2,448	54.69%
Idaho Republican Party	Richard Shurtleff	2,028	45.31%
Total votes		4,476	100.00%

Idaho Legislative District 16 House Seat B General Election, 2022
Party	Candidate	Votes	%
Democratic	Colin Nash (incumbent)	10,618	60.31%
Idaho Republican Party	Jackie Davidson	6,989	39.69%
Total votes		17,607	100.00%
Democratic hold			

=== District 17 ===
Seat A

Idaho Legislative District 17 House Seat A Democratic Primary Election, 2022
Party	Candidate	Votes	%
Democratic	John Gannon (incumbent)	1,773	100.00%
Total votes		1,773	100.00%

Idaho Legislative District 17 House Seat A Republican Primary Election, 2022
Party	Candidate	Votes	%
Idaho Republican Party	April Larson	3,556	100.00%
Total votes		3,556	100.00%

Idaho Legislative District 17 House Seat A General Election, 2022
Party	Candidate	Votes	%
Democratic	John Gannon (incumbent)	10,341	61.11%
Idaho Republican Party	April Larson	6,581	38.89%
Total votes		16,922	100.00%
Democratic hold			

Seat B

Idaho Legislative District 17 House Seat B Democratic Primary Election, 2022
Party	Candidate	Votes	%
Democratic	Sue Chew (incumbent)	1,798	100.00%
Total votes		1,798	100.00%

Idaho Legislative District 17 House Seat B Republican Primary Election, 2022
Party	Candidate	Votes	%
Idaho Republican Party	Mary Ellen Nourse	3,563	100.00%
Total votes		3,563	100.00%

Idaho Legislative District 17 House Seat B General Election, 2022
Party	Candidate	Votes	%
Democratic	Sue Chew (incumbent)	10,325	60.88%
Idaho Republican Party	Mary Ellen Nourse	6,635	39.12%
Total votes		16,960	100.00%
Democratic hold			

=== District 18 ===
Seat A

Idaho Legislative District 18 House Seat A Democratic Primary Election, 2022
Party	Candidate	Votes	%
Democratic	Ilana Rubel (incumbent)	1,870	100.00%
Total votes		1,870	100.00%

Idaho Legislative District 18 House Seat A Republican Primary Election, 2022
Party	Candidate	Votes	%
Idaho Republican Party	MaryKate Johnson	3,622	100.00%
Total votes		3,622	100.00%

Idaho Legislative District 18 House Seat A General Election, 2022
Party	Candidate	Votes	%
Democratic	Ilana Rubel (incumbent)	11,935	65.43%
Idaho Republican Party	MaryKate Johnson	6,307	34.57%
Total votes		18,242	100.00%
Democratic hold			

Seat B

Idaho Legislative District 18 House Seat B Democratic Primary Election, 2022
Party	Candidate	Votes	%
Democratic	Brooke Green (incumbent)	1,819	100.00%
Total votes		1,819	100.00%

Idaho Legislative District 18 House Seat B Republican Primary Election, 2022
Party	Candidate	Votes	%
Idaho Republican Party	Megan Conrad Landen (Note: After winning the Republican primary, Megan Conrad Landen was withdrawn on 7/8/2022. Gregory T. Holtz was the replacement Republican nominee in the district on the general election ballot.)	3,645	100.00%
Total votes		3,645	100.00%

Idaho Legislative District 18 House Seat B General Election, 2022
Party	Candidate	Votes	%
Democratic	Brooke Green (incumbent)	11,756	64.98%
Idaho Republican Party	Gregory T. Holtz	6,336	35.02%
Total votes		18,092	100.00%
Democratic hold			

=== District 19 ===
Seat A

Idaho Legislative District 19 House Seat A Democratic Primary Election, 2022
Party	Candidate	Votes	%
Democratic	Lauren Necochea (incumbent)	2,717	100.00%
Total votes		2,717	100.00%

Idaho Legislative District 19 House Seat A Republican Primary Election, 2022
Party	Candidate	Votes	%
Idaho Republican Party	Melissa J. Christian	4,701	100.00%
Total votes		4,701	100.00%

Idaho Legislative District 19 House Seat A General Election, 2022
Party	Candidate	Votes	%
Democratic	Lauren Necochea (incumbent)	16,838	68.28%
Idaho Republican Party	Melissa J. Christian	7,824	31.72%
Total votes		24,662	100.00%
Democratic hold			

Seat B

Idaho Legislative District 19 House Seat B Democratic Primary Election, 2022
Party	Candidate	Votes	%
Democratic	Chris Mathias (incumbent)	2,703	100.00%
Total votes		2,703	100.00%

Idaho Legislative District 19 House Seat B Republican Primary Election, 2022
Party	Candidate	Votes	%
Idaho Republican Party	James Faasau	4,658	100.00%
Total votes		4,658	100.00%

Idaho Legislative District 19 House Seat B General Election, 2022
Party	Candidate	Votes	%
Democratic	Chris Mathias (incumbent)	16,916	68.74%
Idaho Republican Party	James Faasau	7,694	31.26%
Total votes		24,610	100.00%
Democratic hold			

=== District 20 ===
Seat A

Idaho Legislative District 20 House Seat A Republican Primary Election, 2022
Party	Candidate	Votes	%
Idaho Republican Party	Joe A. Palmer (incumbent)	4,811	62.26%
Idaho Republican Party	Gloria Urwin	2,916	37.74%
Total votes		7,727	100.00%

Idaho Legislative District 20 House Seat A General Election, 2022
Party	Candidate	Votes	%
Idaho Republican Party	Joe A. Palmer (incumbent)	13,634	100.00%
Total votes		13,634	100.00%
Idaho Republican Party hold			

Seat B

Idaho Legislative District 20 House Seat B Republican Primary Election, 2022
Party	Candidate	Votes	%
Idaho Republican Party	James D. Holtzclaw (incumbent)	4,490	58.06%
Idaho Republican Party	Mike Hon	3,243	41.94%
Total votes		7,733	100.00%

Idaho Legislative District 20 House Seat B General Election, 2022
Party	Candidate	Votes	%
Idaho Republican Party	James D. Holtzclaw (incumbent)	13,602	100.00%
Total votes		13,602	100.00%
Idaho Republican Party hold			

=== District 21 ===
Seat A

Idaho Legislative District 21 House Seat A Republican Primary Election, 2022
Party	Candidate	Votes	%
Idaho Republican Party	James Petzke	2,879	38.88%
Idaho Republican Party	Tara Pugmire	2,817	38.05%
Idaho Republican Party	Dom Gelsomino	1,063	14.36%
Idaho Republican Party	Tyler Ricks	645	8.71%
Total votes		7,404	100.00%

Idaho Legislative District 21 House Seat A Democratic Primary Election, 2022
Party	Candidate	Votes	%
Democratic	Josi Christensen	889	100.00%
Total votes		889	100.00%

Idaho Legislative District 21 House Seat A Constitution Primary Election, 2022
Party	Candidate	Votes	%
Constitution	Daniel Weston	6	100.00%
Total votes		6	100.00%

Idaho Legislative District 21 House Seat A Libertarian Primary Election, 2022
Party	Candidate	Votes	%
Libertarian	Mike Long	29	100.00%
Total votes		29	100.00%

Idaho Legislative District 21 House Seat A General Election, 2022
Party	Candidate	Votes	%
Idaho Republican Party	James Petzke	10,829	62.22%
Democratic	Josi Christensen	5,191	29.83%
Constitution	Daniel Weston	881	5.06%
Libertarian	Mike Long	503	2.89%
Total votes		17,404	100.00%
Idaho Republican Party hold			

Seat B

Idaho Legislative District 21 House Seat B Republican Primary Election, 2022
Party	Candidate	Votes	%
Idaho Republican Party	Jeff Ehlers	3,591	50.51%
Idaho Republican Party	Caleb Pirc	2,035	28.63%
Idaho Republican Party	Brandon Dybdal	1,483	20.86%
Total votes		7,109	100.00%

Idaho Legislative District 21 House Seat B General Election, 2022
Party	Candidate	Votes	%
Idaho Republican Party	Jeff Ehlers	13,565	100.00%
Total votes		13,565	100.00%
Idaho Republican Party hold			

=== District 22 ===
Seat A

Idaho Legislative District 22 House Seat A Republican Primary Election, 2022
Party	Candidate	Votes	%
Idaho Republican Party	John Vander Woude (incumbent)	3,898	53.41%
Idaho Republican Party	Greg Ferch (incumbent)	3,400	46.59%
Total votes		7,298	100.00%

Idaho Legislative District 22 House Seat A Democratic Primary Election, 2022
Party	Candidate	Votes	%
Democratic	Natalie R. MacLachlan	1,032	100.00%
Total votes		1,032	100.00%

Idaho Legislative District 22 House Seat A General Election, 2022
Party	Candidate	Votes	%
Idaho Republican Party	John Vander Woude (incumbent)	12,178	62.59%
Democratic	Natalie R. MacLachlan	7,279	37.41%
Total votes		19,457	100.00%
Idaho Republican Party hold			

Seat B

Idaho Legislative District 22 House Seat B Republican Primary Election, 2022
Party	Candidate	Votes	%
Idaho Republican Party	Jason A. Monks (incumbent)	5,989	100.00%
Total votes		5,989	100.00%

Idaho Legislative District 22 House Seat B Democratic Primary Election, 2022
Party	Candidate	Votes	%
Democratic	Dawn Pierce	1,007	100.00%
Total votes		1,007	100.00%

Idaho Legislative District 22 House Seat B General Election, 2022
Party	Candidate	Votes	%
Idaho Republican Party	Jason A. Monks (incumbent)	12,731	66.00%
Democratic	Dawn Pierce	6,559	34.00%
Total votes		19,290	100.00%
Idaho Republican Party hold			

=== District 23 ===
Seat A

Idaho Legislative District 23 House Seat A Republican Primary Election, 2022
Party	Candidate	Votes	%
Idaho Republican Party	Melissa Durrant	2,321	34.10%
Idaho Republican Party	Tammy Payne	1,923	28.25%
Idaho Republican Party	Jason Knopp	1,284	18.87%
Idaho Republican Party	Michael Law	1,278	18.78%
Total votes		6,806	100.00%

Idaho Legislative District 23 House Seat A General Election, 2022
Party	Candidate	Votes	%
Idaho Republican Party	Melissa Durrant	13,616	100.00%
Total votes		13,616	100.00%
Idaho Republican Party hold			

Seat B

Idaho Legislative District 23 House Seat B Republican Primary Election, 2022
Party	Candidate	Votes	%
Idaho Republican Party	Tina Lambert	2,532	38.68%
Idaho Republican Party	Shaun Laughlin	1,926	29.42%
Idaho Republican Party	Chris Bruce	1,428	21.81%
Idaho Republican Party	Lyman Gene Winchester	660	10.08%
Total votes		6,546	100.00%

Idaho Legislative District 23 House Seat B General Election, 2022
Party	Candidate	Votes	%
Idaho Republican Party	Tina Lambert	13,506	100.00%
Total votes		13,506	100.00%
Idaho Republican Party hold			

=== District 24 ===
Seat A

Idaho Legislative District 24 House Seat A Republican Primary Election, 2022
Party	Candidate	Votes	%
Idaho Republican Party	Chenele Dixon	6,131	84.40%
Idaho Republican Party	Tori Orgain-Wakewood	1,133	15.60%
Total votes		7,264	100.00%

Idaho Legislative District 24 House Seat A General Election, 2022
Party	Candidate	Votes	%
Idaho Republican Party	Chenele Dixon	13,280	100.00%
Total votes		13,280	100.00%
Idaho Republican Party hold			

Seat B

Idaho Legislative District 24 House Seat B Republican Primary Election, 2022
Party	Candidate	Votes	%
Idaho Republican Party	Steve Miller	4,366	57.29%
Idaho Republican Party	Creighton Knight	3,255	42.71%
Total votes		7,621	100.00%

Idaho Legislative District 24 House Seat B General Election, 2022
Party	Candidate	Votes	%
Idaho Republican Party	Steve Miller	13,290	100.00%
Total votes		13,290	100.00%
Idaho Republican Party hold			

=== District 25 ===
Seat A

Idaho Legislative District 25 House Seat A Republican Primary Election, 2022
Party	Candidate	Votes	%
Idaho Republican Party	Lance Clow (incumbent)	4,020	100.00%
Total votes		4,020	100.00%

Idaho Legislative District 25 House Seat A General Election, 2022
Party	Candidate	Votes	%
Idaho Republican Party	Lance Clow (incumbent)	9,314	100.00%
Total votes		9,314	100.00%
Idaho Republican Party hold			

Seat B

Idaho Legislative District 25 House Seat B Republican Primary Election, 2022
Party	Candidate	Votes	%
Idaho Republican Party	Gregory Lanting	3,316	72.58%
Idaho Republican Party	Rocky Ferrenburg	1,253	27.42%
Total votes		4,569	100.00%

Idaho Legislative District 25 House Seat B General Election, 2022
Party	Candidate	Votes	%
Idaho Republican Party	Gregory Lanting	8,278	72.40%
Independent	Liyah Babayan	3,155	27.60%
Total votes		11,433	100.00%
Idaho Republican Party hold			

=== District 26 ===
Seat A

Idaho Legislative District 26 House Seat A Democratic Primary Election, 2022
Party	Candidate	Votes	%
Democratic	Ned Burns (incumbent)	2,178	100.00%
Total votes		2,178	100.00%

Idaho Legislative District 26 House Seat A Republican Primary Election, 2022
Party	Candidate	Votes	%
Idaho Republican Party	Mike Pohanka	4,556	100.00%
Total votes		4,556	100.00%

Idaho Legislative District 26 House Seat A General Election, 2022
Party	Candidate	Votes	%
Democratic	Ned Burns (incumbent)	7,962	50.12%
Idaho Republican Party	Mike Pohanka	7,925	49.88%
Total votes		15,887	100.00%
Democratic hold			

Seat B

Idaho Legislative District 26 House Seat B Democratic Primary Election, 2022
Party	Candidate	Votes	%
Democratic	Karma Metzler Fitzgerald	2,122	100.00%
Total votes		2,122	100.00%

Idaho Legislative District 26 House Seat B Republican Primary Election, 2022
Party	Candidate	Votes	%
Idaho Republican Party	Jack Nelsen	2,703	55.77%
Idaho Republican Party	Lyle Johnstone	2,144	44.23%
Total votes		4,847	100.00%

Idaho Legislative District 26 House Seat B General Election, 2022
Party	Candidate	Votes	%
Idaho Republican Party	Jack Nelsen	7,918	50.27%
Democratic	Karma Metzler Fitzgerald	7,834	49.73%
Total votes		15,752	100.00%
Idaho Republican Party gain from Democratic			

=== District 27 ===
Seat A

Idaho Legislative District 27 House Seat A Republican Primary Election, 2022
Party	Candidate	Votes	%
Idaho Republican Party	Douglas T. Pickett	6,740	83.19%
Idaho Republican Party	Carl C. Voigt	1,362	16.81%
Total votes		8,102	100.00%

Idaho Legislative District 27 House Seat A General Election, 2022
Party	Candidate	Votes	%
Idaho Republican Party	Douglas T. Pickett	11,225	100.00%
Total votes		11,225	100.00%
Idaho Republican Party hold			

Seat B

Idaho Legislative District 27 House Seat B Republican Primary Election, 2022
Party	Candidate	Votes	%
Idaho Republican Party	Clay Handy	3,452	41.39%
Idaho Republican Party	John Stokes	1,964	23.55%
Idaho Republican Party	Pat Field	1,841	22.07%
Idaho Republican Party	Kevin Williams	773	9.27%
Idaho Republican Party	Ryan Cook	311	3.73%
Total votes		8,341	100.00%

Idaho Legislative District 27 House Seat B General Election, 2022
Party	Candidate	Votes	%
Idaho Republican Party	Clay Handy	11,057	100.00%
Total votes		11,057	100.00%
Idaho Republican Party hold			

=== District 28 ===
Seat A

Idaho Legislative District 28 House Seat A Republican Primary Election, 2022
Party	Candidate	Votes	%
Idaho Republican Party	Richard "Rick" Cheatum	3,661	52.91%
Idaho Republican Party	Dawn L. Morrell	3,258	47.09%
Total votes		6,919	100.00%

Idaho Legislative District 28 House Seat A General Election, 2022
Party	Candidate	Votes	%
Idaho Republican Party	Richard "Rick" Cheatum	13,086	100.00%
Total votes		13,086	100.00%
Idaho Republican Party hold			

Seat B

Idaho Legislative District 28 House Seat B Republican Primary Election, 2022
Party	Candidate	Votes	%
Idaho Republican Party	Dan Garner	3,531	52.23%
Idaho Republican Party	R. Scott Workman	3,230	47.77%
Total votes		6,761	100.00%

Idaho Legislative District 28 House Seat B General Election, 2022
Party	Candidate	Votes	%
Idaho Republican Party	Dan Garner	12,986	100.00%
Total votes		12,986	100.00%
Idaho Republican Party hold			

=== District 29 ===
Seat A

Idaho Legislative District 29 House Seat A Republican Primary Election, 2022
Party	Candidate	Votes	%
Idaho Republican Party	Dustin Whitney Manwaring (incumbent)	2,800	57.88%
Idaho Republican Party	S. Craig Yadon	2,038	42.12%
Total votes		4,838	100.00%

Idaho Legislative District 29 House Seat A Democratic Primary Election, 2022
Party	Candidate	Votes	%
Democratic	Mary Shea	1,360	100.00%
Total votes		1,360	100.00%

Idaho Legislative District 29 House Seat A General Election, 2022
Party	Candidate	Votes	%
Idaho Republican Party	Dustin Whitney Manwaring (incumbent)	7,575	52.22%
Democratic	Mary Shea	6,931	47.78%
Total votes		14,506	100.00%
Idaho Republican Party hold			

Seat B

Idaho Legislative District 29 House Seat B Democratic Primary Election, 2022
Party	Candidate	Votes	%
Democratic	Nate Roberts	1,346	100.00%
Total votes		1,346	100.00%

Idaho Legislative District 29 House Seat B Republican Primary Election, 2022
Party	Candidate	Votes	%
Idaho Republican Party	Jake Stevens	2,461	52.04%
Idaho Republican Party	Greg Romriell	2,268	47.96%
Total votes		4,729	100.00%

Idaho Legislative District 29 House Seat B General Election, 2022
Party	Candidate	Votes	%
Democratic	Nate Roberts	7,321	50.39%
Idaho Republican Party	Jake Stevens	7,209	49.61%
Total votes		14,530	100.00%
Democratic hold			

=== District 30 ===
Seat A

Idaho Legislative District 30 House Seat A Republican Primary Election, 2022
Party	Candidate	Votes	%
Idaho Republican Party	David Cannon (incumbent)	6,700	100.00%
Total votes		6,700	100.00%

Idaho Legislative District 30 House Seat A General Election, 2022
Party	Candidate	Votes	%
Idaho Republican Party	David Cannon (incumbent)	11,652	100.00%
Total votes		11,652	100.00%
Idaho Republican Party hold			

Seat B

Idaho Legislative District 30 House Seat B Republican Primary Election, 2022
Party	Candidate	Votes	%
Idaho Republican Party	Julianne Young (incumbent)	5,978	100.00%
Total votes		5,978	100.00%

Idaho Legislative District 30 House Seat B Democratic Primary Election, 2022
Party	Candidate	Votes	%
Democratic	Travis Oler	306	100.00%
Total votes		306	100.00%

Idaho Legislative District 30 House Seat B General Election, 2022
Party	Candidate	Votes	%
Idaho Republican Party	Julianne Young (incumbent)	9,033	69.02%
Democratic	Travis Oler	4,054	30.98%
Total votes		13,087	100.00%
Idaho Republican Party hold			

=== District 31 ===
Seat A

Idaho Legislative District 31 House Seat A Republican Primary Election, 2022
Party	Candidate	Votes	%
Idaho Republican Party	Jerald Raymond	5,868	55.08%
Idaho Republican Party	Karey Hanks (incumbent)	4,785	44.92%
Total votes		10,653	100.00%

Idaho Legislative District 31 House Seat A Democratic Primary Election, 2022
Party	Candidate	Votes	%
Democratic	Connie Delaney	312	100.00%
Total votes		312	100.00%

Idaho Legislative District 31 House Seat A General Election, 2022
Party	Candidate	Votes	%
Idaho Republican Party	Jerald Raymond	14,401	85.98%
Democratic	Connie Delaney	2,349	14.02%
Total votes		16,750	100.00%
Idaho Republican Party hold			

Seat B

Idaho Legislative District 31 House Seat B Republican Primary Election, 2022
Party	Candidate	Votes	%
Idaho Republican Party	Rod Furniss (incumbent)	6,558	62.70%
Idaho Republican Party	Darnell Shipp	3,902	37.30%
Total votes		10,460	100.00%

Idaho Legislative District 31 House Seat B Democratic Primary Election, 2022
Party	Candidate	Votes	%
Democratic	Wayne Talmadge	305	100.00%
Total votes		305	100.00%

Idaho Legislative District 31 House Seat B General Election, 2022
Party	Candidate	Votes	%
Idaho Republican Party	Rod Furniss (incumbent)	14,384	86.13%
Democratic	Wayne Talmadge	2,316	13.87%
Total votes		16,700	100.00%
Idaho Republican Party hold			

=== District 32 ===
Seat A

Idaho Legislative District 32 House Seat A Republican Primary Election, 2022
Party	Candidate	Votes	%
Idaho Republican Party	Stephanie Jo Mickelsen	4,300	62.14%
Idaho Republican Party	Nicholas T. Christiansen	2,620	37.86%
Total votes		6,920	100.00%

Idaho Legislative District 32 House Seat A General Election, 2022
Party	Candidate	Votes	%
Idaho Republican Party	Stephanie Jo Mickelsen	10,227	100.00%
Total votes		10,227	100.00%
Idaho Republican Party hold			

Seat B

Idaho Legislative District 32 House Seat B Republican Primary Election, 2022
Party	Candidate	Votes	%
Idaho Republican Party	Wendy Horman (incumbent)	5,247	100.00%
Total votes		5,247	100.00%

Idaho Legislative District 32 House Seat B General Election, 2022
Party	Candidate	Votes	%
Idaho Republican Party	Wendy Horman (incumbent)	10,258	100.00%
Total votes		10,258	100.00%
Idaho Republican Party hold			

=== District 33 ===
Seat A

Idaho Legislative District 33 House Seat A Republican Primary Election, 2022
Party	Candidate	Votes	%
Idaho Republican Party	Barbara Ehardt (incumbent)	3,318	56.75%
Idaho Republican Party	Jeff Thompson	2,529	43.25%
Total votes		5,847	100.00%

Idaho Legislative District 33 House Seat A Democratic Primary Election, 2022
Party	Candidate	Votes	%
Democratic	Miranda Marquit	503	100.00%
Total votes		503	100.00%

Idaho Legislative District 33 House Seat A General Election, 2022
Party	Candidate	Votes	%
Idaho Republican Party	Barbara Ehardt (incumbent)	7,816	60.05%
Democratic	Miranda Marquit	5,200	39.95%
Total votes		13,016	100.00%
Idaho Republican Party hold			

Seat B

Idaho Legislative District 33 House Seat B Republican Primary Election, 2022
Party	Candidate	Votes	%
Idaho Republican Party	Marco Erickson (incumbent)	4,030	100.00%
Total votes		4,030	100.00%

Idaho Legislative District 33 House Seat B General Election, 2022
Party	Candidate	Votes	%
Idaho Republican Party	Marco Erickson (incumbent)	8,649	100.00%
Total votes		8,649	100.00%
Idaho Republican Party hold			

=== District 34 ===
Seat A

Idaho Legislative District 34 House Seat A Republican Primary Election, 2022
Party	Candidate	Votes	%
Idaho Republican Party	Jon O. Weber (incumbent)	2,825	55.40%
Idaho Republican Party	Jason "JD" Drollinger	2,274	44.60%
Total votes		5,099	100.00%

Idaho Legislative District 34 House Seat A General Election, 2022
Party	Candidate	Votes	%
Idaho Republican Party	Jon O. Weber (incumbent)	7,224	100.00%
Total votes		7,224	100.00%
Idaho Republican Party hold			

Seat B

Idaho Legislative District 34 House Seat B Republican Primary Election, 2022
Party	Candidate	Votes	%
Idaho Republican Party	Britt Raybould	2,641	50.34%
Idaho Republican Party	Ron Nate (incumbent)	2,605	49.66%
Total votes		5,246	100.00%

Idaho Legislative District 34 House Seat B General Election, 2022
Party	Candidate	Votes	%
Idaho Republican Party	Britt Raybould	7,099	100.00%
Total votes		7,099	100.00%
Idaho Republican Party hold			

=== District 35 ===
Seat A

Idaho Legislative District 35 House Seat A Republican Primary Election, 2022
Party	Candidate	Votes	%
Idaho Republican Party	Kevin Andrus (incumbent)	5,172	60.31%
Idaho Republican Party	Jon Goode	3,404	39.69%
Total votes		8,576	100.00%

Idaho Legislative District 35 House Seat A General Election, 2022
Party	Candidate	Votes	%
Idaho Republican Party	Kevin Andrus (incumbent)	13,520	100.00%
Total votes		13,520	100.00%
Idaho Republican Party hold			

Seat B

Idaho Legislative District 35 House Seat B Republican Primary Election, 2022
Party	Candidate	Votes	%
Idaho Republican Party	Josh Wheeler	4,714	52.00%
Idaho Republican Party	Chad Christensen (incumbent)	4,352	48.00%
Total votes		9,066	100.00%

Idaho Legislative District 35 House Seat B General Election, 2022
Party	Candidate	Votes	%
Idaho Republican Party	Josh Wheeler	13,597	100.00%
Total votes		13,597	100.00%
Idaho Republican Party hold			

== See also ==
- 2022 United States elections
- 2022 United States Senate election in Idaho
- 2022 United States House of Representatives elections in Idaho
- 2022 Idaho elections
- 2022 Idaho gubernatorial election
- 2022 Idaho Senate election
- Idaho Legislature
- List of Idaho state legislatures
