= Brooke Green =

American politician and businesswoman

Member of the Idaho House of Representatives from the 18th district
- Incumbent
- Assumed office December 1, 2018
- Preceded by: Phylis King

Personal details
- Party: Democratic
- Spouse: Jeremy Byington
- Education: Boise State University (BA); Northwest Nazarene University (MBA)

Brooke Green is an American politician and businesswoman serving as a member of the Idaho House of Representatives from the 18th district, which includes a portion of Boise, Idaho.

== Early life and education ==
Green was raised in Los Alamos, New Mexico. She has an identical twin sister, Dawn. She earned a Bachelor of Arts degree in communications and marketing technology from Boise State University, followed by a Master of Business Administration from Northwest Nazarene University.

== Career ==
Green works as a transportation planner at the Ada County Highway District. She also served as chair of the City of Boise Open Space and Clean Water. Green was elected to the Idaho House of Representatives in 2018. In 2025, after receiving a breast cancer diagnosis, eight male Republican colleagues shaved their head in a move of solidarity with Green. They were Mike Pohanka, John Shirts, Jaron Crane, Josh Wheeler, Dan Garner, Mark Sauter, Jeff Cornilles, and Jack Nelsen.

== Personal life ==
Green's husband, Jeremy Byington, is a sheriff's deputy with the Ada County Sheriff's Department and veteran of the Iraq War. They live in Boise, Idaho.
