= Lauren Necochea =

American politician

Chair of the Idaho Democratic Party
- Incumbent
- Assumed office March 12, 2022
- Preceded by: Deborah Silver (acting)

Member of the Idaho House of Representatives from the 19th district
- In office December 2019 – November 30, 2024
- Preceded by: Mat Erpelding
- Succeeded by: Monica Church

Personal details
- Born: Lauren Bentley Smith Boise, Idaho, U.S.
- Party: Democratic
- Children: 2
- Education: Pomona College (BA); Princeton University (MPA)

Lauren Necochea (née Smith) is an American politician. A member of the Democratic Party, she served in the Idaho House of Representatives from 2019 to 2024. She represented the 19th district, which includes a portion of Boise, the state capital. Since 2022, she has served as chair of the Idaho Democratic Party.

== Early life and education ==
Necochea was born Lauren Bentley Smith in Boise, Idaho to Dr. Michael Smith and Susan Smith. Her father is a dentist and her mother founded the Idaho Women's Charitable Foundation.

She earned a Bachelor of Arts degree in economics from Pomona College and a Master of Arts in public affairs from Princeton University. Necochea was the recipient of a Fulbright Scholarship.

== Career ==
After earning her master's degree, Necochea worked as a program evaluator for the Baltimore City Health Department. She later returned to Boise. She worked as the director of the Idaho Center for Fiscal Policy and Idaho Voices for Children. Necochea was on the steering committee for the Idahoans for Healthcare campaign, which supported the 2018 Proposition 2 campaign to expand Medicaid in Idaho.

=== Political career ===
In December 2019, Necochea was appointed to the Idaho House of Representatives by Governor Brad Little, succeeding Mat Erpelding, who resigned from the House to take a lobbying position. She was elected in the 2020 and 2022 House of Representatives elections.

In March 2022, she was elected chair of the Idaho Democratic Party, replacing acting chair Deborah Silver. Necochea announced February 2024 that she will not run for re-election and focus on being chair of the Idaho Democratic Party.

== Personal life ==
In 2006, she married Alejandro José Necochea, a Yale School of Medicine-educate internal physician. Necochea lives in Boise, Idaho with her husband and two daughters.

Party political offices
Preceded by Deborah Silver; Acting	Chair of the Idaho Democratic Party; 2022–present	Incumbent
