= Megan Woller =

American politician

Member-elect of the Idaho House of Representatives from the 16A district
- Assuming office December 2026
- Succeeding: Soñia Galaviz

Personal details
- Party: Democratic

Megan Woller is an American politician. A member of the Democratic Party, she is the member-elect for the 16A district of the Idaho House of Representatives.
