= William Killen =

William Killen may refer to:

- William Dool Killen (1806–1902), Irish Presbyterian minister and church historian
- William Wilson Killen (1860–1939), Australian politician
- Bill Killen (William M. Killen, born 1938), American politician
- William Killen (1722–1805), Irish-born first chief justice and first chancellor under the Constitution of 1792 of the state of Delaware, U.S.
