= Bill Killen =

American politician (1938–2024)

Member of the Idaho House of Representatives from District 17 Seat A
- In office December 1, 2006 – November 30, 2012
- Preceded by: Kathie Garrett
- Succeeded by: John Gannon

Personal details
- Born: November 5, 1938 Olympia, Washington
- Died: July 13, 2024 (aged 85) Boise, Idaho
- Party: Democratic
- Education: Stanford University; University of Idaho College of Law
- Profession: Attorney

Military service
- Branch/service: United States Navy
- Years of service: 1960–1964

William 'Bill' Michael Killen (November 5, 1938 – July 13, 2024) was an American politician and Democratic member of the Idaho State Representative from 2006 to 2012.

== Early life, education and career. ==
Killen earned his bachelor's and master's degrees in electrical engineering from Stanford University and earned his law degree from University of Idaho College of Law. He served on the city council McCall from 1994 to 1997 and as mayor from 1996 to 1997.

== Elections ==
=== 2010 ===
Killen was unopposed in the Democratic primary. Killen defeated Republican nominee Craig Thomas and Libertarian nominee Mikel Hautzinger with 56.7% of the vote.

=== 2008 ===
Killen was unopposed in the Democratic primary. Killen defeated Libertarian nominee Mikel Haulzinger with 76.7% of the vote.

=== 2006 ===
Killen was unopposed in the Democratic primary. Killen defeated incumbent Republican Kathie Garrett(who won in 2004 by 9 votes) and Constitution Party nominee Katherine Frazier.
