= Tina Lambert =

American politician

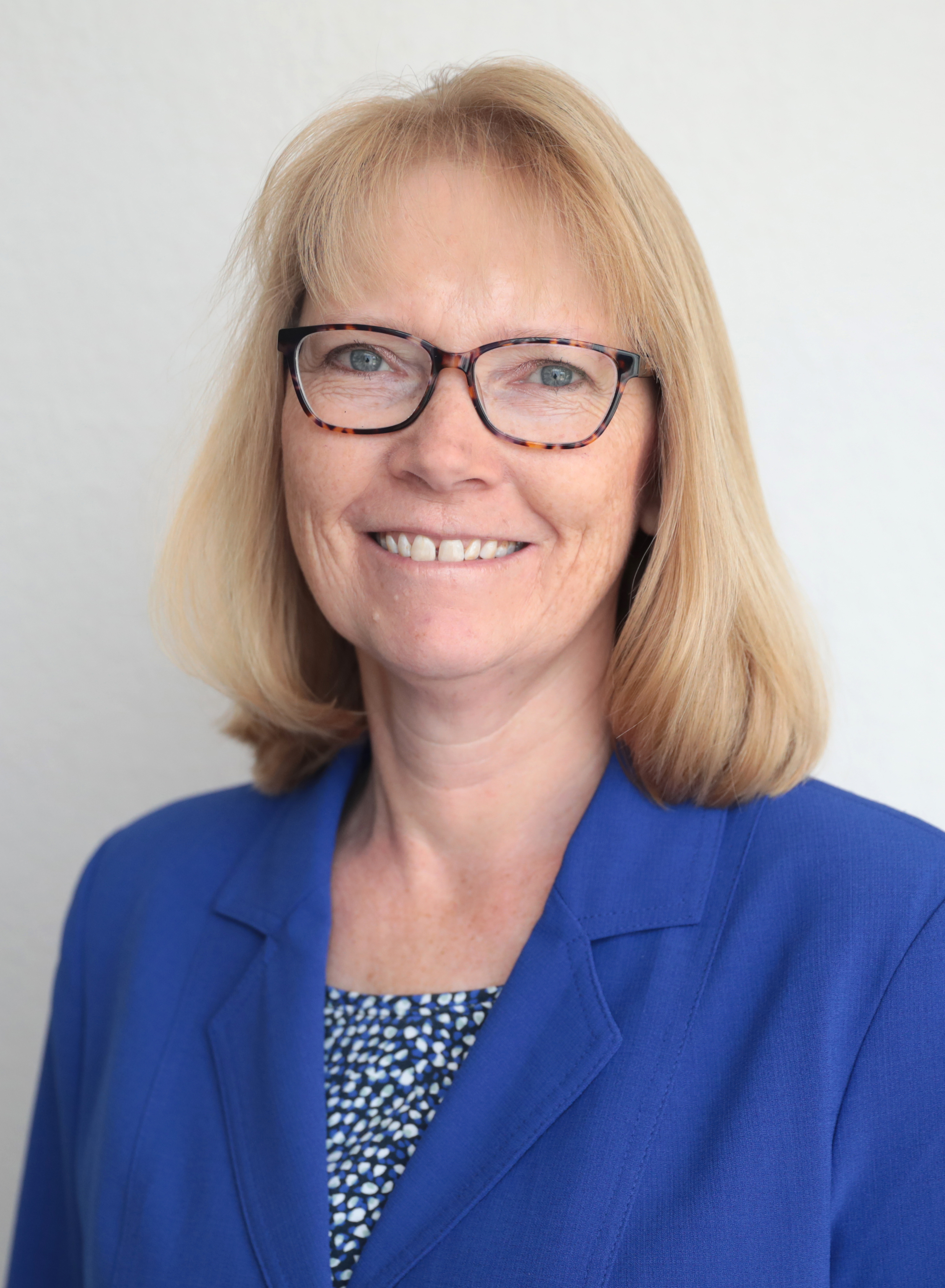

Member of the Idaho House of Representatives from the 23B district
- In office December 1, 2022 – November 30, 2024
- Succeeded by: Shawn Dygert

Personal details
- Party: Republican

Tina Lambert is an American politician. She served as a Republican member for the 23B district of the Idaho House of Representatives.
