= Jacyn Gallagher =

American politician

Member of the Idaho House of Representatives from the District 9 seat A district
- In office December 1, 2022 – November 30, 2024
- Preceded by: Ryan Kerby
- Succeeded by: John Shirts

Personal details
- Born: 1964 (age 61–62)
- Party: Republican
- Occupation: Idaho State Legislator

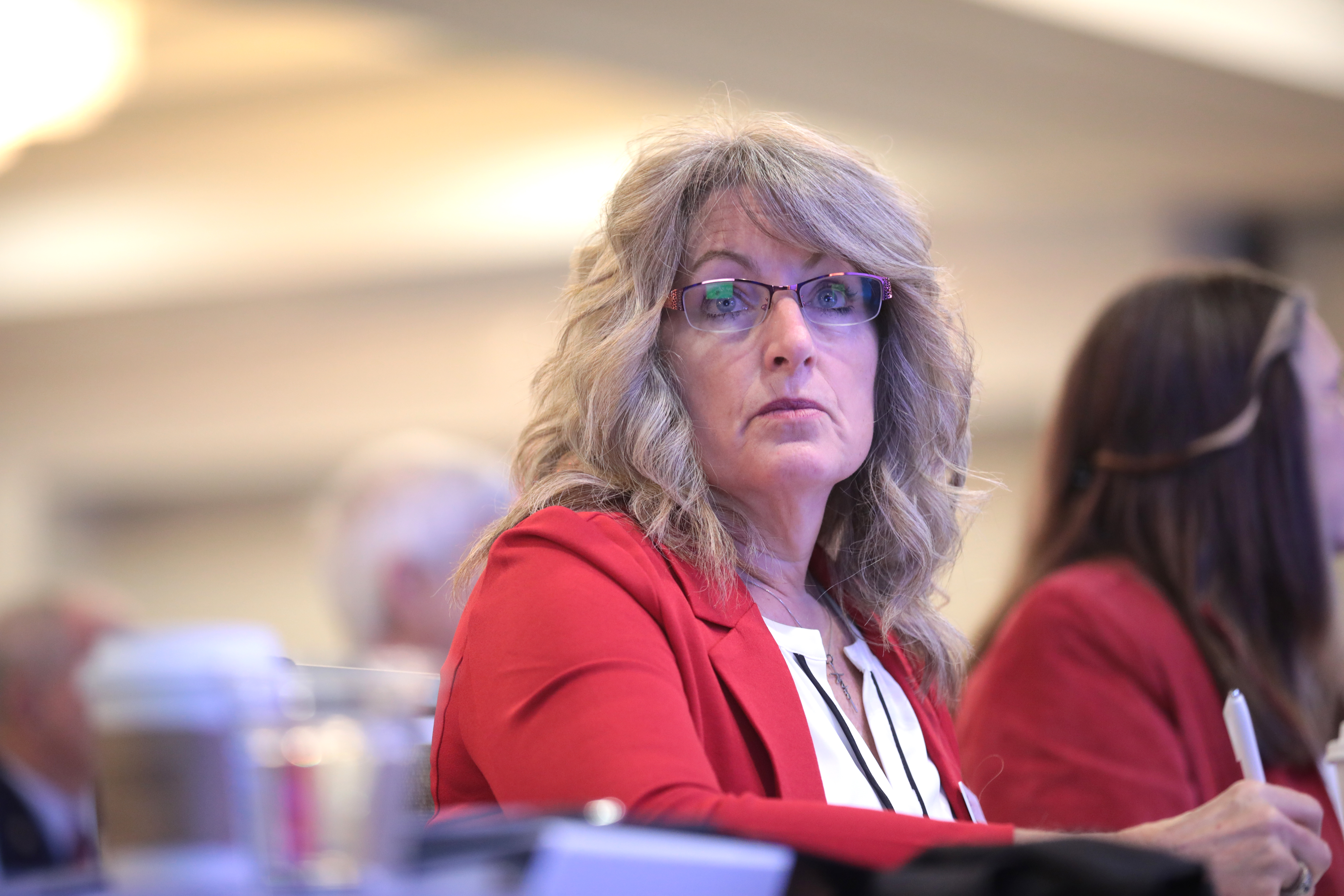
Jacyn Gallagher in 2022

Jacyn Giesbers-Gallagher is an American politician from Idaho. A Republican, she is a former member of the Idaho House of Representatives for District 9 seat A.

== Career ==
On May 17, 2022, Gallagher won the Republican primary, defeating Ryan Kerby with 51.1% of the votes.

On November 8, 2022, Gallagher won the general election and became a Republican member of the Idaho House of Representatives for District 9 seat A. Gallagher was unopposed in the general election.

In April, 2025, Gallagher was appointed Chairwoman of Idaho Freedom PAC.
