= Shawn Dygert =

American politician

Member of the Idaho House of Representatives from the 23rd district
- Incumbent
- Assumed office December 5, 2024 Serving with Chris Bruce
- Preceded by: Tina Lambert

Personal details
- Party: Republican
- Education: Utah State University; University of Idaho
- Website: www.shawndygert4idaho.com

Shawn R. Dygert is an American politician who is currently serving as a Republican member of the Idaho House of Representatives, representing the 23rd district.

Born in Blackfoot, Idaho Dygert attended Utah State University and graduated with a bachelor's degree.

In the 2024 Idaho House of Representatives election, he defeated Tina Lambert in the Republican primary.
