= Chris Bruce (politician) =

American politician

Member of the Idaho House of Representatives from the 23rd district
- Incumbent
- Assumed office December 5, 2024 Serving with Shawn Dygert

Personal details
- Party: Republican
- Website: www.cbruce4idaho.com

Chris Bruce is an American politician who is currently serving as a Republican member of the Idaho House of Representatives, representing the 23rd district.

Bruce was born and raised in Georgia. He previously worked as a mortgage loan officer. He was elected a member of Kuna City Council in 2021.

In the 2024 Idaho House of Representatives election, he was elected in the general election.
