= Kyle Harris (politician) =

American politician

Member of the Idaho House of Representatives from the 7th district
- Incumbent
- Assumed office December 5, 2024
- Preceded by: Mike Kingsley

Personal details
- Party: Republican
- Children: 3

Kyle N. Harris is an American politician and businessman who is currently serving as a Republican member of the Idaho House of Representatives, representing the 7th district. He was first elected in 2024, defeating Democratic nominee Vickie Nostrant with 75.4% of the vote.

== Personal life and career ==
Harris is married and has two children.

== Political views ==
=== Diversity, equity, and inclusion ===
Harris supported Senate Bill 1198, which bans DEI-related hiring, admissions, and prevents most schools from requiring DEI classes.

=== Language ===
Harris was a co-sponsor of Joint Resolution 6, which intends to put a legislatively referred referendum on the ballot in Idaho to make English the official state language.

=== Term limits ===
Harris signed the U.S. Term Limits pledge in April 2024.

== Electoral Record ==
2024 Idaho House of Representatives election, District 7A
Party	Candidate	Votes	%
Republican	Kyle Harris	19,797	75.4
Democratic	Vickie Nostrant	6,456	24.6
Total votes		26,254	100
