= Megan Egbert =

American politician

Member of the Idaho House of Representatives from the 17B district
- Incumbent
- Assumed office June 2024
- Preceded by: Sue Chew

Personal details
- Party: Democratic
- Education: Boise State University; University of North Texas

Megan Egbert is an American politician and former librarian serving as a Democratic member of the Idaho House of Representatives from the 17B District since June 2024.

== Political career ==
Egbert was appointed to the House in May 2024 by Governor Brad Little following the death of Representative Sue Chew, and sworn into office in June 2024.

=== Committee assignments ===
- Commerce & Human Resources
- Environment, Energy & Technology
- Health & Welfare
