= Bruce Skaug =

American attorney and politician

Member of the Idaho House of Representatives from the 10th district
- Incumbent
- Assumed office December 1, 2020
- Preceded by: Robert Anderst

Personal details
- Born: Pocatello, Idaho, U.S.
- Party: Republican
- Education: College of Southern Idaho (AA); University of Idaho (BS, JD)
- Occupation: Politician, attorney

Bruce D. Skaug is an American attorney and politician. A Republican, Skaug has served as a member of the Idaho House of Representatives from the 10th district since 2020. He previously served as a deputy prosecutor in Ada County and as a member of the Nampa City Council.

== Early life and education ==
Skaug was born in Pocatello, Idaho, and raised in Jerome. He earned an associate degree in social sciences from the College of Southern Idaho, a Bachelor of Science in political science from the University of Idaho, and a Juris Doctor from the University of Idaho College of Law.

== Career ==
After graduating from law school, Skaug worked as a civil practice attorney. He served as the deputy prosecutor of Ada County, Idaho and was a member of the Nampa City Council from 2014 to 2020.

He was elected to the Idaho House of Representatives in the November 2020 election and assumed office on December 1, 2020. He won reelection in 2022, where he faced no opposition.

In 2024 and 2025, Skaug sponsored laws that would enact the death penalty for child rape, in defiance of Kennedy v. Louisiana. This bill would be signed into law by Governor Brad Little in March 27, 2025. Skaug also sponsored a law in 2025 that would make firing squads as the primary method of execution instead of lethal injection. Governor Little would also sign this.

In 2025, Bruce Skaug sponsored two Prohibitionist laws regarding marijuana in Idaho. Skaug was floor sponsor of “House Joint Resolution 4” which removed the ability to legalize marijuana in the state of Idaho from anyone besides the legislature. Skaug also introduced “House Bill 7” to place minimum sentences and fines on citizens arrested in Idaho with possession of any small amount of marijuana.
