= John Shirts =

American politician

United States Attorney for the District of Idaho
- Incumbent
- Assumed office October 17, 2026
- President: Donald Trump
- Preceded by: Bart Davis

Member of the Idaho House of Representatives from the District 9 seat A district
- In office January 6, 2025 – October 18. 2026
- Preceded by: Jacyn Gallagher
- Succeeded by: Kimberly Royer

Personal details
- Party: Republican
- Education: University of Idaho (BA); University of Colorado Law School (JD); Harvard University (ALM)
- Occupation: Idaho State Legislator
- Website: shirtsforidaho.com

John Shirts is an American politician from Idaho. A Republican, he is a former member of the Idaho House of Representatives for District 9 seat A. Shirts resigned from the Idaho House in October 2026 after being appointed as United States Attorney for the District of Idaho.
