= Anne Henderson Haws =

American politician (born 1984)

Anne Henderson Haws (born October 18, 1983) is an American attorney and politician serving as a member of the Idaho House of Representatives representing Idaho's 16th legislative district Seat B. A member of the Democratic Party, she was appointed to the seat in July 2025 by Governor Brad Little to fill a vacancy created by the resignation of Todd Achilles.

== Early life and education ==
Haws was born in Nampa, Idaho. She attended Lewis & Clark College, where she earned a Bachelor of Arts in philosophy and religious studies. She later attended the University of Idaho College of Law, where she served as the editor-in-chief of the Idaho Law Review and earned her Juris Doctor in 2017.

== Legal career ==
Haws is a civil litigator specializing in complex commercial suits and business torts. Her practice includes representing clients in cases involving breach of contract, fraud, defamation, and breach of fiduciary duty. She also provides strategic counsel on the impacts of newly enacted or changing laws and policies. Before entering private practice, she served as a judicial law clerk at the United States District Court for the District of Idaho, completing sequential terms with U.S. Magistrate Judge Candy W. Dale and U.S. District Judge B. Lynn Winmill.

== Academic career ==
Haws serves as an adjunct professor at the University of Idaho College of Law. She has taught courses on the Federal Rules of Civil Procedure, Conflicts of Law, and Advanced Torts.

== Political career ==
On July 22, 2025, Haws was appointed to the Idaho House of Representatives to represent District 16 (Seat B), following the resignation of Todd Achilles. She serves on the House Agricultural Affairs, Commerce and Human Resources, and State Affairs committees. Her political work has included serving as lead counsel for Idahoans United for Women and Families, focusing on protecting the constitutional right of Idaho citizens to pass legislation via ballot initiative.
