= Don Hall (politician) =

American politician

Member of the Idaho House of Representatives from the 25A district
- Incumbent
- Assumed office December 12, 2025
- Preceded by: Lance Clow

Personal details
- Party: Republican

Donald (Don) Hall is an American politician who has been a member of the Idaho House of Representatives since 2025. Governor Brad Little appointed him to replace Lance Clow. Hall was chairman of the Twin Falls County Commission and is the former mayor of Twin Falls.
