= Soñia Galaviz =

American politician

Member of the Idaho House of Representatives from the 16A district
- Incumbent
- Assumed office December 1, 2022
- Preceded by: John McCrostie
- Succeeded by: Megan Woller (elect)

Personal details
- Born: Silver Valley, Idaho, U.S.
- Party: Democratic
- Children: 2
- Education: Boise State University (BA, MA, EdD)

Soñia R. Galaviz is an American politician serving as a member of the Idaho House of Representatives for District 16A. She assumed office on December 1, 2022.

== Early life and education ==
The daughter of immigrants from Mexico, Galaviz was born and raised in the Silver Valley region of Idaho. She earned a Bachelor of Arts, a Master of Arts, and an EdD in curriculum and instruction from Boise State University.

== Career ==
Outside of politics, Galaviz is a teacher at Whittier Elementary School in Boise, Idaho. She was elected to the Idaho House of Representatives in November 2022 and assumed office on December 1, 2022.
