= Ted Hill (politician) =

American politician

Member of the Idaho House of Representatives from the 14A district
- Incumbent
- Assumed office December 1, 2022

Personal details
- Party: Republican

Ted Hill, also known as Edward Hill, is an American politician. He serves as a Republican member for the 14A district of the Idaho House of Representatives.
