= John Vander Woude =

American politician from Idaho

Member of the Idaho House of Representatives
- Incumbent
- Assumed office December 1, 2010
- Preceded by: Rich Jarvis
- Constituency: 21st district Seat A (2010–2012); 22nd district Seat A (2012–present)
- In office December 1, 2006 – November 30, 2008
- Preceded by: Bill Sali
- Succeeded by: Rich Jarvis
- Constituency: 21st district Seat A (2006–2008)

Personal details
- Born: Paramount, California, U.S.
- Party: Republican
- Children: 3, including Lori Den Hartog

Military service
- Branch/service: United States Army
- Years of service: 1968-1970

John Vander Woude is an American politician serving as a member of the Idaho House of Representatives from the 22A district. He has also served as House majority caucus leader since 2013. He previously represented the 21A district in the House from 2006 to 2008.

== Early life ==
Vander Woude was born in Paramount, California. He graduated from high school and served in the United States Army from 1968 until 1970.

== Career ==
Vander Woude worked as a dairy farmer until he retired. He was a member of the Nampa Christian School Board for 16 years and also served on the boards of the United Dairymen of Idaho, Milk Producers of Idaho, and Idaho Dairy Herd Improvement Association.

He was first elected to the Idaho House of Representatives in 2006 and served until he was defeated by Rich Jarvis by 65 votes in 2008. He was re-elected to his old seat in 2010. Vander Woude's district was adjusted after the 2010 United States census, and he has won re-election in 2012, 2014, 2016, 2018, and 2020.

== Personal life ==
Vander Woude's daughter, Lori Den Hartog, is a member of the Idaho Senate. This marked the first time a father and daughter have served together in the Idaho legislature.
