= Joe Alfieri =

American politician

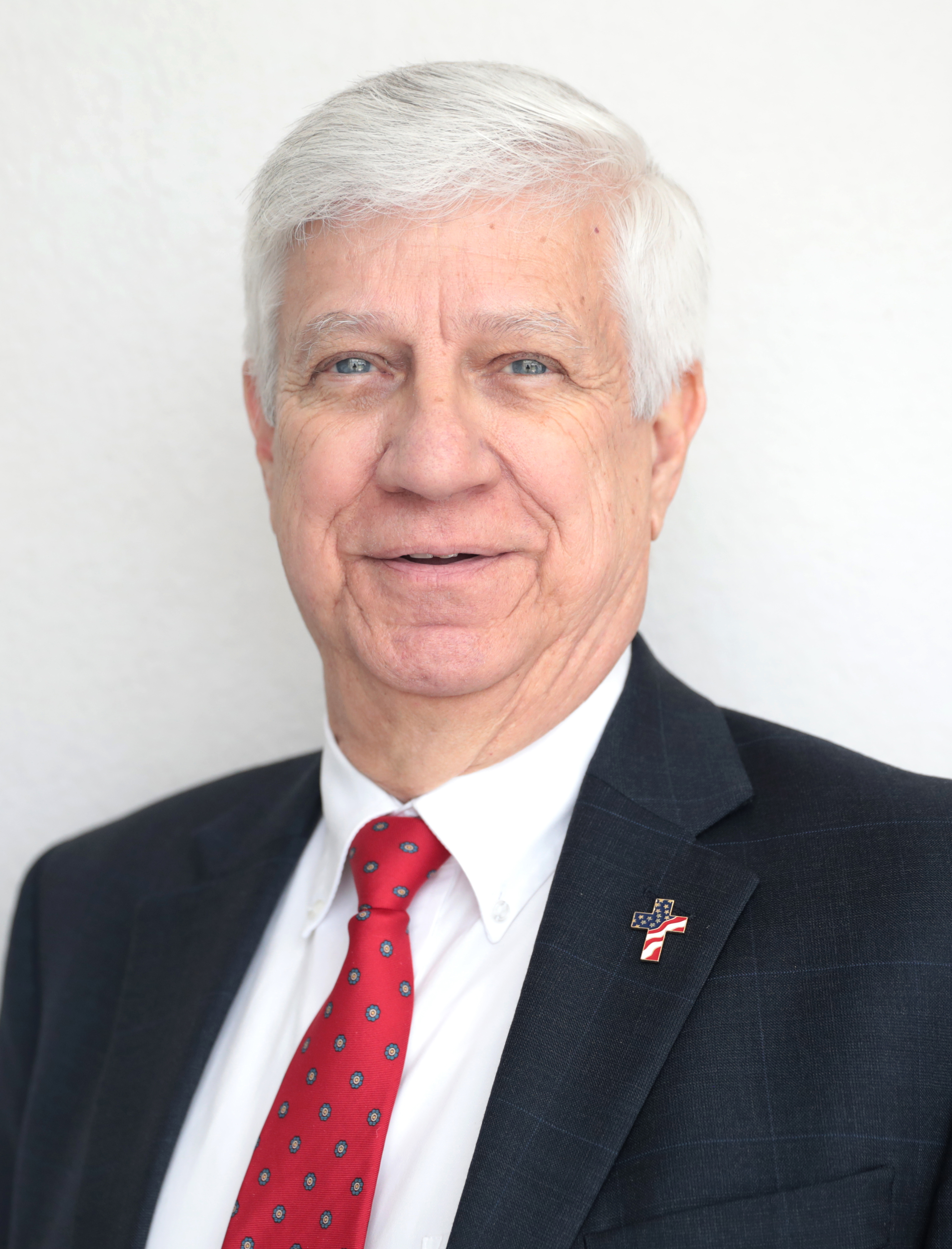

Member of the Idaho House of Representatives from the 4A district
- Incumbent
- Assumed office December 1, 2022

Personal details
- Party: Republican

Joe Alfieri is an American politician. He serves as a Republican member for the 4A district of the Idaho House of Representatives.
