= Jon Weber (politician) =

American politician

Member of the Idaho House of Representatives from the 34th district
- Incumbent
- Assumed office December 1, 2020
- Preceded by: Doug Ricks

Personal details
- Party: Republican
- Spouse: Heather Cardon
- Children: 5

Jon Weber is an American politician and businessman serving as a member of the Idaho House of Representatives from the 34th district. He assumed office on December 1, 2020.

== Early life and education ==
Weber was raised in Michigan. He studied business at Ricks College and Utah State University

== Career ==
Weber has owned and operated several businesses and served as chairman of the Madison County Commission. He was elected to the Idaho House of Representatives in November 2020, succeeding Doug Ricks.
