= Stephanie Mickelsen =

American politician from Idaho

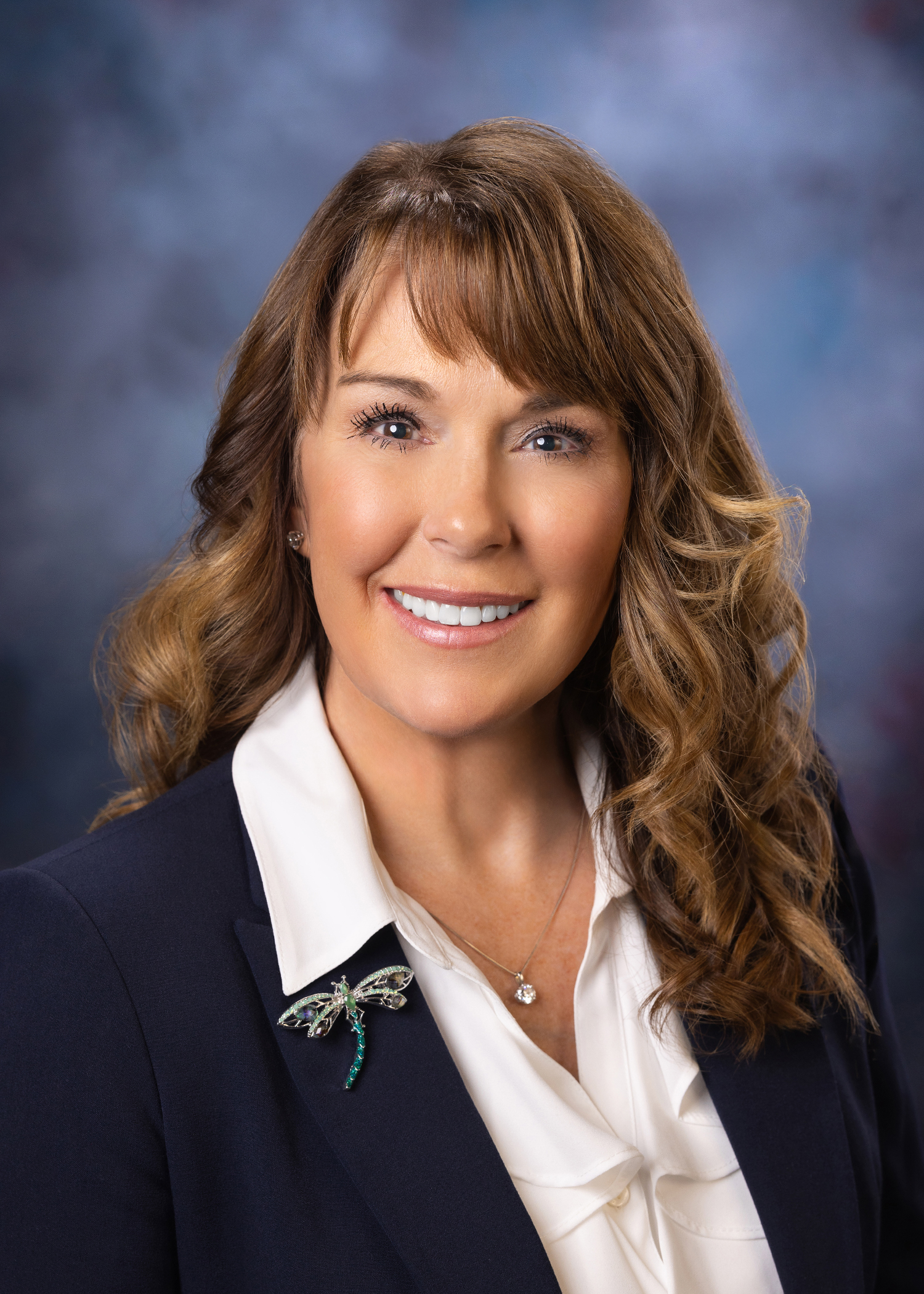

Member of the Idaho House of Representatives from the 32nd district
- Incumbent
- Assumed office December 1, 2022
- Preceded by: Marc Gibbs

Personal details
- Party: Republican
- Occupation: Farmer, politician
- Website: stephanie4idaho.com

Stephanie Jo Mickelsen (born in Idaho Falls, Idaho) is an American politician, farmer, and civic leader serving as a Republican member of the Idaho House of Representatives for District 32A since 2022. Mickelsen played a key negotiating role in the 2024 groundwater–surface water mitigation agreement, which prevented the curtailment of irrigation water and helped keep thousands of acres of farmland in production. In 2025, she and her husband, Mark, were inducted into the Eastern Idaho Agriculture Hall of Fame in recognition of their leadership in farming and irrigation innovation. As a trustee of the College of Eastern Idaho, she supported the college’s expansion of programs and governance, advocating for community-driven workforce training.

== Early life and career ==
Mickelsen graduated from Blackfoot High School in 1987 and earned an associate degree in economics from Brigham Young University–Idaho. She and her husband, Mark, operate Mickelsen Farms in Eastern Idaho, producing potatoes, seed potatoes, canola, and wheat.

She has served as chair of the Bonneville-Jefferson Ground Water District, chair of the Idaho Ground Water Appropriators, a trustee of the College of Eastern Idaho, and on the board of the Eastern Idaho Regional Medical Center.

== Idaho House of Representatives ==
Mickelsen was elected to the Idaho House of Representatives in November 2022 and assumed office on December 1. She serves on the Transportation & Defense, Resources & Conservation, and State Affairs committees.

=== Water policy and agriculture ===
- As chair of the Idaho Ground Water Appropriators, Mickelsen promoted science-based management of the Eastern Snake Plain Aquifer, balancing senior surface water rights with groundwater use.
- She supported expanding Rule 50 for conjunctive water management to reflect updated hydrologic science.
- In 2024, she helped negotiate a groundwater–surface water mitigation agreement that prevented widespread irrigation curtailments in Eastern Idaho.
- On her farm, she has implemented advanced irrigation technologies, including telemetry and evapotranspiration monitoring, to improve efficiency.

In March 2025, Stephanie and Mark Mickelsen were inducted into the Eastern Idaho Agriculture Hall of Fame for their leadership and innovation.

=== Education ===
Mickelsen supports local control of education policy and has emphasized “go-on” programs to prepare students for careers or higher education. She has also highlighted the role of community colleges in workforce development, drawing on her experience as a trustee of the College of Eastern Idaho, where she strengthened governance and expanded programming.

=== Transportation ===
She has introduced legislation to allow optional mobile driver’s licenses in Idaho, arguing that they would increase convenience and security. The proposal has been considered in multiple sessions, with lawmakers debating cybersecurity and implementation.

=== Government transparency ===
In 2025, Mickelsen sponsored House Bill 378, requiring legislators, legislators-elect, and legislative candidates to disclose out-of-state travel funded by outside entities if related to governmental or policy purposes. Reports must be filed within 30 days, with $25-per-day fines for noncompliance. After a contentious debate, the bill passed the Idaho House by a 47–22 vote and advanced to the Senate.

=== Political challenges within the party ===
Mickelsen has faced significant criticism from Republican activists in Idaho such as Ryan Spoon, vice chair of the Ada County Republican Party, who in January 2025 publicly urged ICE to raid Mickelsen’s farm, accusing her of employing undocumented workers. Within days, ICE agents visited her operation, resulting in one worker being arrested and brought to a detention center in Las Vegas. Mickelsen has stated that the farm follows "all applicable federal and state laws to stay in compliance." Mickelsen has also faced local GOP censure attempts and challenges from hard-right primary opponents. She has spoken about the personal impact of these threats but maintains her positions on labor, immigration, and transparency as principled.

== Personal life ==
Mickelsen and her husband, Mark, live in Idaho Falls, where they run their family farming operation. They have four children and several grandchildren.
