= Jeff Cornilles =

American politician

Member of the Idaho House of Representatives from the 12A district
- Incumbent
- Assumed office December 1, 2022

Personal details
- Party: Republican
- Education: University of Idaho

Jeff Cornilles is an American politician. He serves as a Republican member for the 12A district of the Idaho House of Representatives.

== Life and career ==
Cornilles attended Nampa High School and the University of Idaho.

In May 2022, Cornilles defeated Machele Hamilton and Sebastian Griffin in the Republican primary election for the 12A district of the Idaho House of Representatives. No candidate was nominated to challenge him in the general election.
