= Chris Mathias =

American politician

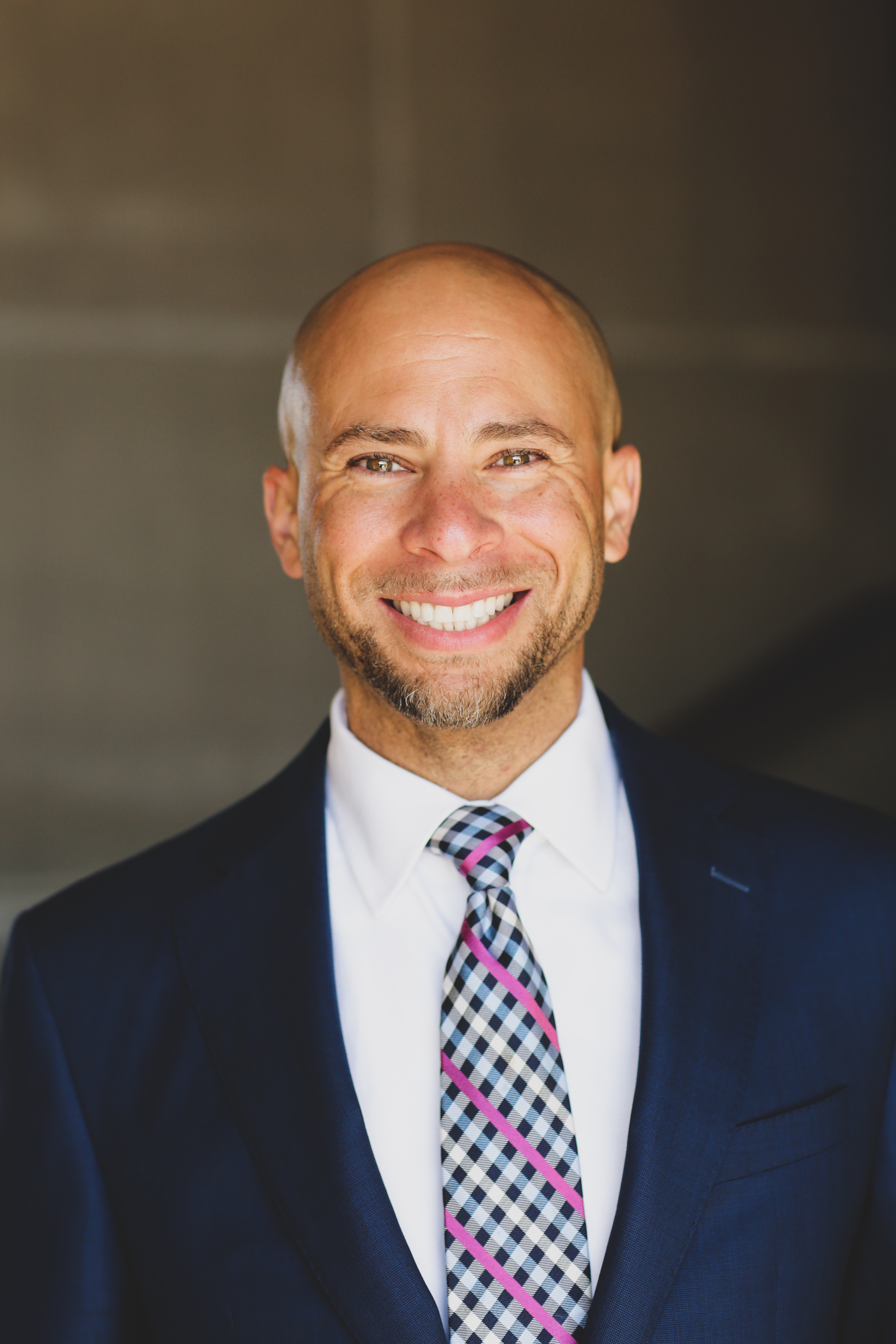

Member of the Idaho House of Representatives from District 19, Seat B
- Incumbent
- Assumed office December 1, 2020
- Preceded by: Melissa Wintrow

Personal details
- Born: May 14, 1978 (age 48) Farmington, Connecticut, U.S.
- Party: Democratic
- Children: 2
- Education: Boise State University (BS); Vermont Law School (JD); Northeastern University (PhD)

Military service
- Allegiance: United States
- Branch/service: United States Coast Guard
- Years of service: 1996–2000
- Rank: Petty Officer 3rd Class
- Awards: Arctic Service Medal; Antarctica Service Medal (2); Sea Service Ribbon; Coast Guard Achievement Medal; Coast Guard Good Conduct Medal; Pistol Marksmanship Ribbon; Rifle Marksmanship Ribbon

Christopher P. Mathias (born May 14, 1978) is an American politician and attorney serving as a member of the Idaho House of Representatives from the 19th district, which includes a portion of Boise, Idaho. He is the first African American man to serve in the Idaho Legislature and its only current Black member.

== Early life and education ==
Mathias enlisted in the United States Coast Guard after graduating from high school. During his service, Mathias engaged in search and rescue and law enforcement operations, and later conducted shipboard communications on the USCGC Polar Star, the nation's heaviest non-nuclear icebreaker.

He used the G.I. Bill to earn a Bachelor of Science in criminal justice administration from Boise State University, where he was student body president and the university's first McNair Scholar. Mathias later earned a Juris Doctor from Vermont Law School and a doctorate in law and public policy from Northeastern University. His dissertation focused on how Idaho has implemented the National Incident Management System.

== Career ==
Mathias worked as law clerk for U.S. Senator Patrick Leahy and later as a lecturer at Northeastern University. After completing his Ph.D., he worked as the chief academic officer for the Idaho State Board of Education and then for the University of California, Santa Cruz.

Mathias is the recipient of the Idaho Governor's Commendation for Distinguished Public Service and the Idaho Business Review's Accomplished 40 Under 40 award.

== Personal life ==
Mathias lives in the North End neighborhood of Boise, Idaho, with his wife Katie and their two children.
