= Jeff Ehlers =

American politician

Member of the Idaho House of Representatives from the 21B district
- Incumbent
- Assumed office December 1, 2022

Personal details
- Party: Republican

Jeff Ehlers is an American politician. He serves as a Republican member for the 21B district of the Idaho House of Representatives.
