= Douglas Pickett =

American politician

Member of the Idaho House of Representatives from the 27A district
- Incumbent
- Assumed office December 1, 2022
- Preceded by: Scott Bedke

Personal details
- Born: Twin Falls, Idaho, U.S.
- Party: Republican
- Children: 3
- Education: Brigham Young University (BS)

Douglas T. Pickett is an American politician and rancher serving as a member of the Idaho House of Representatives for the 27A district. He assumed office on December 1, 2022.

== Early life and education ==
Born in Twin Falls, Idaho, Pickett graduated from Oakley Junior/Senior High School. He earned a Bachelor of Science degree in economics from Brigham Young University in 1995. A member of The Church of Jesus Christ of Latter-day Saints, Pickett served a mission in Germany.

== Career ==
With his brothers, Pickett co-owns and operates Pickett Ranch, which produces wheat, potatoes, beef, and lamb. He served as a commissioner of the Oakley Valley Cemetery District, vice chair of the Cassia County Gateway Powerline Task Force, and chair of the Cassia County Federal Lands Advisory Group. Pickett was elected to the Idaho House of Representatives in November 2022, succeeding Scott Bedke.

== Elections ==
District 27 - Cassia and Minidoka Counties
Year	Candidate	Votes	Pct	Candidate	Votes	Pct
2012 Primary	Dean Cameron (inc.)	3,773	56.5%	Douglas Pickett	2,900	43.5%
