= Elaine Price =

American politician

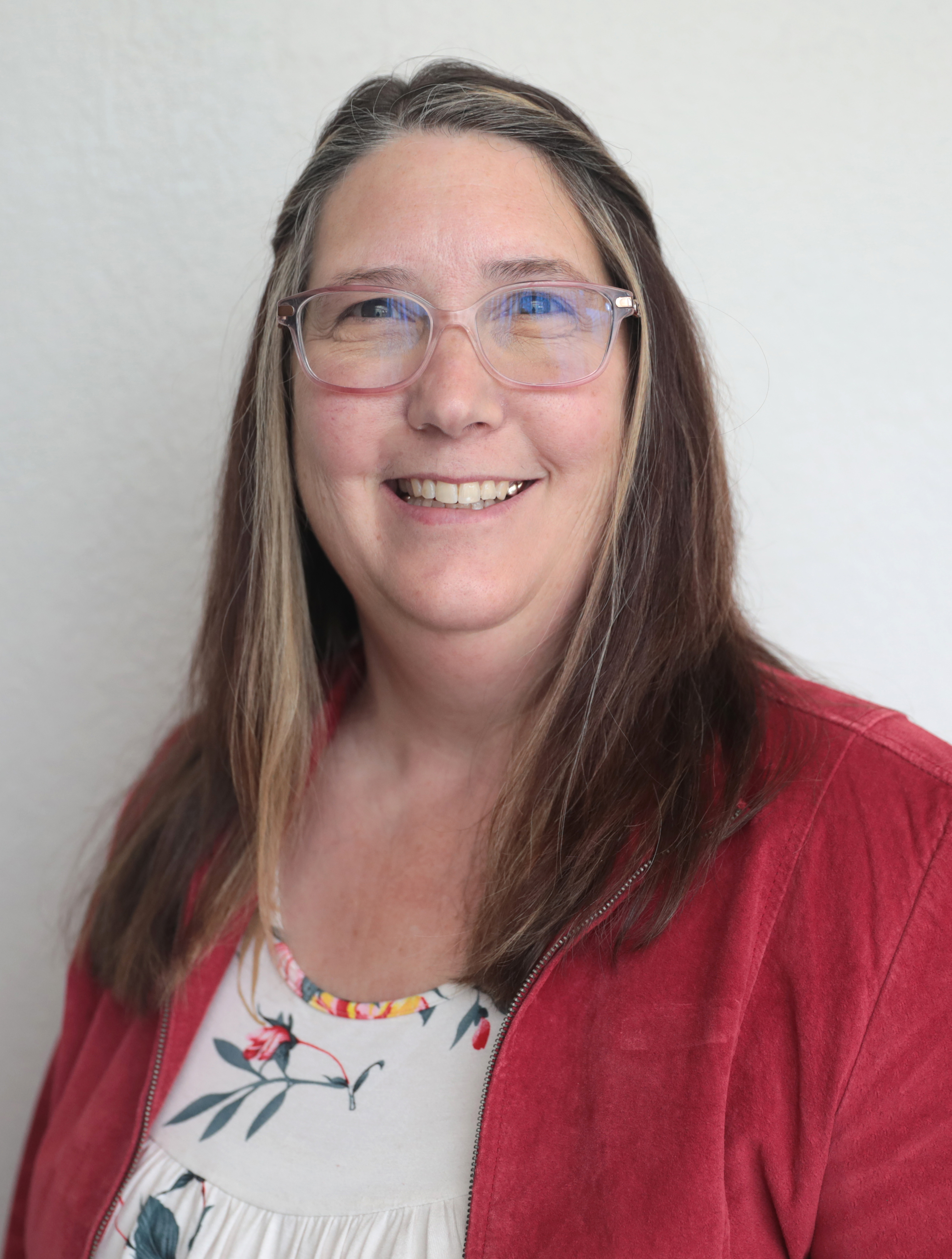

Member of the Idaho House of Representatives from the 4B district
- Incumbent
- Assumed office December 1, 2022

Personal details
- Party: Republican

Elaine Price is an American politician. She serves as a Republican member for the 4B district of the Idaho House of Representatives.
