= Richard Cheatum =

American politician

Member of the Idaho House of Representatives from the 28A district
- Incumbent
- Assumed office December 1, 2022

Personal details
- Party: Republican

Richard Cheatum is an American politician. He serves as a Republican member for the 28A district of the Idaho House of Representatives.
