= Ilana Rubel =

American politician from Idaho

Minority Leader of the Idaho House of Representatives
- Incumbent
- Assumed office December 10, 2019
- Preceded by: Mat Erpelding

Member of the Idaho House of Representatives from the 18th district Seat A
- Incumbent
- Assumed office January 8, 2014
- Preceded by: Janie Ward-Engelking

Personal details
- Born: 1972 (age 53–54) Toronto, Canada
- Party: Democratic
- Spouse: John Paschke
- Children: 4
- Education: Georgetown University (BA); Harvard University (JD)

Ilana S. Rubel (born 1972) is a Canadian-born American politician, currently serving as a Democratic member of the Idaho House of Representatives. She represents the south Boise-based District 18 since January 2014. Rubel currently serves as Minority Leader of the House of Representatives.

== Early life and education ==
Rubel was born in Toronto, Canada. Her family is Jewish with her father's family escaping pogroms and her mother's family immigrating during World War II. She grew up in a household with a single mother. She attended the University of Toronto Schools as a child. She is a graduate of Georgetown University and Harvard Law School.

== Career ==
Prior to joining the Idaho House of Representatives, Rubel was a partner with the law firm Fenwick & West in Boise. She became a member of the Idaho House of Representatives in 2014. Rubel was appointed to the position by Gov. Butch Otter to serve the remainder of the term of Janie Ward-Engelking, who was appointed to the Idaho Senate.

Rubel ran for Idaho House Minority Leader after the then incumbent, Rep. Mat Erpelding, resigned in December 2019 to take a position with the Boise Metro Chamber of Commerce.

Idaho House of Representatives
Preceded by Mat Erpelding	Minority Leader of the Idaho House of Representatives; 2019–present	Incumbent
