= Dori Healey =

American politician

Member of the Idaho House of Representatives from the 15B district
- Incumbent
- Assumed office December 1, 2022

Personal details
- Party: Republican

Dori Healey is an American politician. She serves as a Republican member for the 15B district of the Idaho House of Representatives.

Healey owns and operates Idaho Outreach Medicine, a mobile primary care practice based in Boise, Idaho. The practice provides home-based and telehealth services, with a focus on older adults, homebound patients, and improving access to medical care in rural Idaho communities.

She is currently serving her second term in the Idaho House of Representatives after running unopposed in the 2024 primary and defeating Shari Baber (D) in the general election.
