= John Gannon (Idaho politician) =

American politician from Idaho

Member of the Idaho House of Representatives from the 17A district
- Incumbent
- Assumed office December 1, 2012
- Preceded by: Bill Killen
- In office December 1, 1990 – December 1, 1992
- Preceded by: Edward Osborne
- Succeeded by: Jesse Berain

Personal details
- Born: Ross, California, U.S.
- Party: Democratic
- Education: University of California, Davis (BA); University of California, Hastings (JD)
- Website: johngannon.org

John L. Gannon is an American attorney and politician serving as a member of the Idaho House of Representatives from the 17A district. Elected in 2012, he previously represented the same district from 1990 to 1992.

== Early life and education ==
Gannon was born in Ross, California. He earned a Bachelor of Arts degree from the University of California, Davis and a Juris Doctor from the University of California, Hastings College of the Law.

== Elections ==
- 1992: Gannon originally won the seat in the November 6, 1990, general election.
- 1994: Gannon was unopposed (and therefore not listed) in the May 24, 1994, Democratic primary, but lost the November 3, 1992, general election to Republican Jesse Berain, who held the seat from 1994 until 1998.
- 2002: Gannon ran for the district's B seat in the May 28, 2002, Democratic primary but lost; Berain had also run but lost to Janet Miller, who held that seat from 2002 until 2006.
- 2012: when Democratic Representative William Killen retired, Gannon filed for election and was unopposed for the 2012 Democratic primary election, and won with 1,306 votes. Gannon won the three-way November 6, 2012, general election with 8,959 votes (56.6%) against Republican nominee Kreed Kleinkopf and Independent candidate Gus Voss.
