= Josh Tanner =

American politician

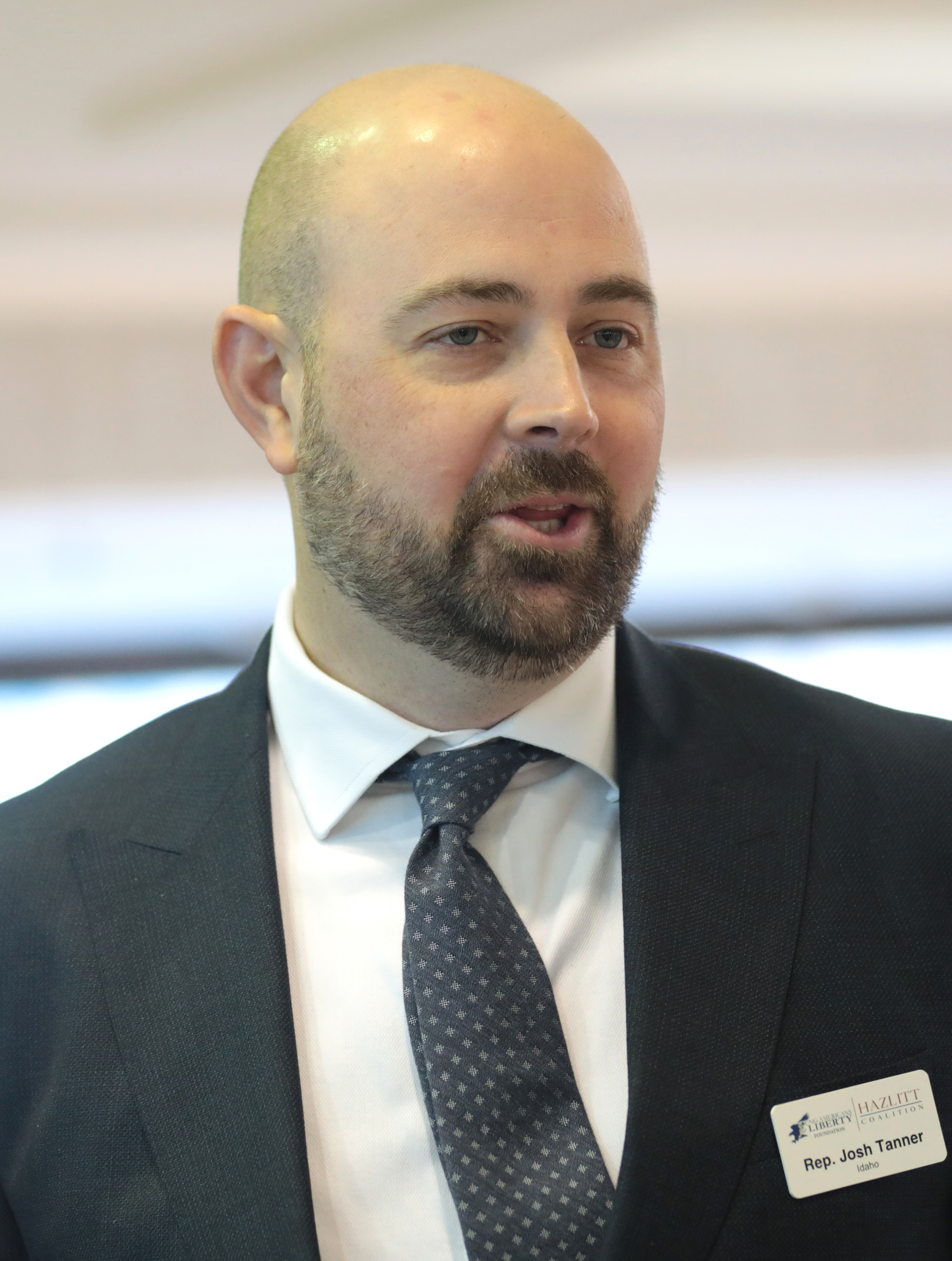

Member of the Idaho House of Representatives from the 14B district
- Incumbent
- Assumed office December 1, 2022
- Preceded by: Gayann DeMordaunt

Personal details
- Party: Republican
- Education: Boise State University (BS, MBA)

Josh Tanner is an American politician serving as a member of the Idaho House of Representatives for the District 14, seat B. He assumed office on December 1, 2022.

== Early life and education ==
Tanner was raised in the Treasure Valley region. He earned a Bachelor of Science and Executive MBA from Boise State University.

== Career ==
Tanner operates multiple small businesses and served as a commissioner of the Eagle Fire Protection District. He was elected to the Idaho House of Representatives in November 2022. Tanner was elected House Assistant Majority Leader prior to the 2025 session and serves on the Appropriations, Resources & Conservation, and Ways & Means Committees.
