= Marco Erickson =

American politician

Member of the Idaho House of Representatives from the 33rd district
- Incumbent
- Assumed office December 1, 2020
- Preceded by: Bryan Zollinger

Personal details
- Born: Montana, U.S.
- Party: Republican
- Education: Montana State University, Billings (BS); Walden University (MS)

Marco Erickson is an American politician serving as a member of the Idaho House of Representatives from the 33rd district. Elected in November 2020, he assumed office on December 1, 2020.

== Early life and education ==
Erickson was born in Montana and raised in Boise, Idaho. He earned a Bachelor of Science degree in psychology from Montana State University Billings and a Master of Science in psychology from Walden University.

== Career ==
Erickson has worked as a psycho-social rehabilitation (PSR) worker for several organizations. From 2014 to 2017, he was a project coordinator for the Nevada Department of Education. In 2019, he was a prevention specialist for the East Idaho Public Health District. He was also a health program manager in the Nevada Division of Public and Behavioral Health.

Erickson was elected to the Idaho House of Representatives in November 2020. He assumed office on December 1, 2020. He was reelected in 2022 and 2024.
