= Clay Handy =

American businessman and politician

Member of the Idaho House of Representatives from the 27th (B) district
- Incumbent
- Assumed office January 9, 2023
- Preceded by: Fred Wood

Personal details
- Party: Republican
- Spouse: Kristine Hansen

Clay Handy is an American businessman and politician who currently serves as a member of the Idaho House of Representatives. Handy has served on the Burley City Council, as a Cassia County commissioner, and on several community advisory boards. Handy is the president and CEO of Handy Truck Line, a regional trucking company. Handy was first elected to the Legislature in 2022.

Handy earned a bachelor's degree in business management from Brigham Young University. He is a member of the Church of Jesus Christ of Latter-day Saints, and served for a time as a bishop in that faith.

== Tenure ==
Handy joined the Joint Finance Appropriations Committee in his first term. The JFAC is considered a "powerful legislative committee" since it "sets each element of the state budget."

Handy cosponsored the “Clean Slate Act,” which would allow criminal records to be sealed in the case of some minor, non-violent offenses.
