= Idaho House of Representatives =

Lower chamber of the Idaho State Legislature

Coordinates: 43°37′04″N 116°11′59″W

- Idaho Legislature

Type
- Type: Lower house
- Term limits: None

History
- New session started: January 6, 2025

Leadership
- Speaker: Mike Moyle (R) since December 1, 2022
- Majority Leader: Jason Monks (R) since February 12, 2024
- Minority Leader: Ilana Rubel (D) since December 10, 2019

Structure
- Seats: 70
- Political groups: Majority: Republican (61); Minority: Democratic (9)
- Length of term: 2 years
- Authority: Article IV, Idaho Constitution
- Salary: $16,116/year + per diem

Elections
- Last election: November 5, 2024
- Next election: November 3, 2026
- Redistricting: Idaho Redistricting Commission

Meeting place
- House of Representatives Chamber; Idaho State Capitol; Boise, Idaho

Website
- Idaho House of Representatives

Rules
- House Rules

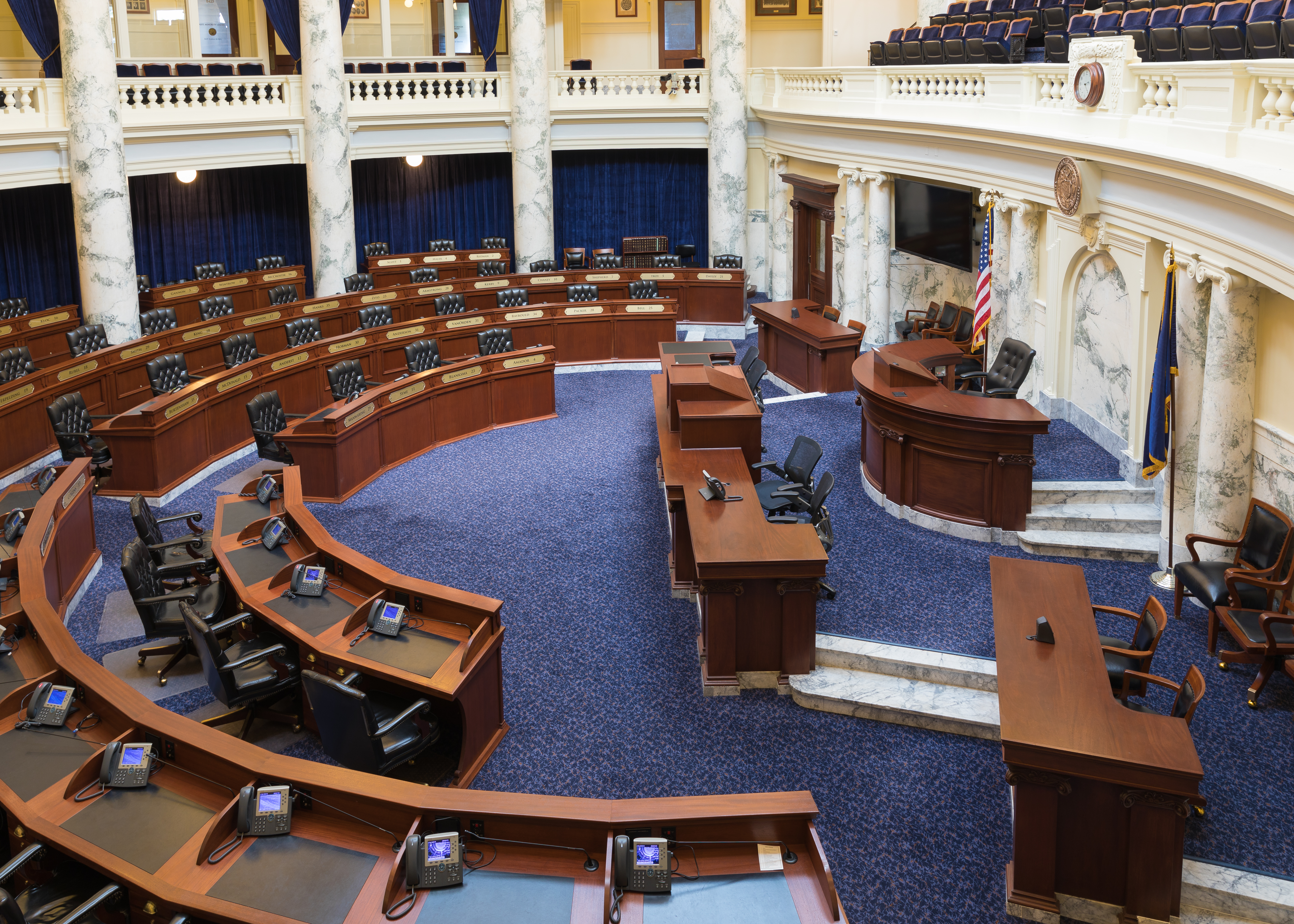
Chamber of the House of Representatives in 2018

The Idaho House of Representatives is the lower chamber of the Idaho Legislature.

It consists of 70 representatives elected to two-year terms. The state is divided into 35 districts, each of which elects two representatives. It meets at the Idaho State Capitol in Boise.

== Composition of the House ==
The Idaho House of Representatives has been continuously controlled by the Republican Party since the late 1950s, usually by a wide margin. Democrats picked up six seats in the 2006 elections. In the 2010 elections Republicans won back all but one of those seats. In the 2012 elections, the first election after redistricting in 2011, Democrats gained two seats in Ada County, but Republicans offset those gains by winning a seat in Bannock County and a seat in the district representing the Democratic stronghold Blaine County. In 2014, two Republican incumbents representing swing districts in North Central Idaho lost re-election, but one Republican picked up a seat previously held by a Democrat in the same region.

Affiliation	Party (Shading indicates majority caucus)		Total	Vacant
Affiliation	Republican	Democratic	Total	Vacant
63rd Legislature (2015–16)	56	14	70	0
64th Legislature (2017–18)	59	11	70	0
65th Legislature (2019–20)	56	14	70	0
66th Legislature (2021–22)	58	12	70	0
67th Legislature (2023–24)	59	11	70	0
Beginning of 68th Legislature (2025)	61	9	70	0
Latest voting share	87.1%	12.9%		

=== Leadership in the 68th Legislature ===
Position	Name	Party	District
Speaker	Mike Moyle	Republican	10
Majority Leader	Jason Monks	Republican	22
Assistant Majority Leader	Josh Tanner	Republican	14
Majority Caucus Chair	Jaron Crane	Republican	12
Minority Leader	Ilana Rubel	Democratic	18
Assistant Minority Leader	Steve Berch	Democratic	15
Minority Caucus Chair	Vacant	Democratic	

=== Members of the Idaho House of Representatives ===
District	Seat	Name	Party	Counties	Start
1	A	Mark Sauter	Republican	Bonner (part), Boundary	2022
1	B	Cornel Rasor	Republican	Bonner (part), Boundary	2024
2	A	Heather Scott	Republican	Benewah, Bonner (part), Clearwater, Kootenai (part), Shoshone	2014
2	B	Dale Hawkins	Republican	Benewah, Bonner (part), Clearwater, Kootenai (part), Shoshone	2022
3	A	Vito Barbieri	Republican	Kootenai (part)	2010
3	B	Jordan Redman	Republican	Kootenai (part)	2022
4	A	Joe Alfieri	Republican	Kootenai (part)	2022
4	B	Elaine Price	Republican	Kootenai (part)	2022
5	A	Ron Mendive	Republican	Kootenai (part)	2012
5	B	Tony Wisniewski	Republican	Kootenai (part)	2018
6	A	Lori McCann	Republican	Latah, Lewis, Nez Perce (part)	2021
6	B	Brandon Mitchell	Republican	Latah, Lewis, Nez Perce (part)	2020
7	A	Kyle Harris	Republican	Adams, Idaho, Nez Perce (part)	2024
7	B	Charlie Shepherd	Republican	Adams, Idaho, Nez Perce (part)	2020
8	A	Rob Beiswenger	Republican	Boise, Custer, Elmore, Valley	2024
8	B	Faye Thompson	Republican	Boise, Custer, Elmore, Valley	2024
9	A	Kimberly Royer	Republican	Canyon (part), Payette, Washington	2026
9	B	Judy Boyle	Republican	Canyon (part), Payette, Washington	2008
10	A	Mike Moyle	Republican	Ada (part), Canyon (part)	1998
10	B	Bruce Skaug	Republican	Ada (part), Canyon (part)	2020
11	A	Kent Marmon	Republican	Canyon (part)	2024
11	B	Lucas Cayler	Republican	Canyon (part)	2024
12	A	Jeff Cornilles	Republican	Canyon (part)	2022
12	B	Jaron Crane	Republican	Canyon (part)	2022
13	A	Brent Crane	Republican	Canyon (part)	2006
13	B	Steve Tanner	Republican	Canyon (part)	2024
14	A	Ted Hill	Republican	Ada (part), Gem	2022
14	B	Josh Tanner	Republican	Ada (part), Gem	2022
15	A	Steve Berch	Democratic	Ada (part)	2018
15	B	Dori Healey	Republican	Ada (part)	2022
16	A	Soñia Galaviz	Democratic	Ada (part)	2022
16	B	Anne Henderson Haws	Democratic	Ada (part)	2025
17	A	John Gannon (Note: Gannon previously served in the state house from 1990–1992.)	Democratic	Ada (part)	2012
17	B	Megan Egbert	Democratic	Ada (part)	2024
18	A	Ilana Rubel	Democratic	Ada (part)	2014
18	B	Brooke Green	Democratic	Ada (part)	2018
19	A	Monica Church	Democratic	Ada (part)	2024
19	B	Chris Mathias	Democratic	Ada (part)	2020
20	A	Joe Palmer	Republican	Ada (part)	2008
20	B	James Holtzclaw	Republican	Ada (part)	2012
21	A	James Petzke	Republican	Ada (part)	2022
21	B	Jeff Ehlers	Republican	Ada (part)	2022
22	A	John Vander Woude (Note: Vander Woude previously served in the state house from 2006–2008.)	Republican	Ada (part)	2010
22	B	Jason Monks	Republican	Ada (part)	2012
23	A	Chris Bruce	Republican	Ada (part), Canyon (part), Owyhee	2024
23	B	Shawn Dygert	Republican	Ada (part), Canyon (part), Owyhee	2024
24	A	Clint Hostetler	Republican	Camas, Gooding, Twin Falls (part)	2024
24	B	Steve Miller (Note: Miller previously served in the state house from 2012–2020.)	Republican	Camas, Gooding, Twin Falls (part)	2022
25	A	Don Hall	Republican	Twin Falls (part)	2025
25	B	David Leavitt	Republican	Twin Falls (part)	2024
26	A	Mike Pohanka	Republican	Blaine, Jerome, Lincoln	2024
26	B	Jack Nelsen	Republican	Blaine, Jerome, Lincoln	2022
27	A	Douglas Pickett	Republican	Cassia, Minidoka, Oneida	2022
27	B	Clay Handy	Republican	Cassia, Minidoka, Oneida	2022
28	A	Richard Cheatum	Republican	Bannock (part), Franklin, Power	2022
28	B	Dan Garner	Republican	Bannock (part), Franklin, Power	2022
29	A	Dustin Manwaring (Note: Manwaring previously served in the state house from 2016–2018.)	Republican	Bannock (part)	2020
29	B	Tanya Burgoyne	Republican	Bannock (part)	2024
30	A	David Cannon	Republican	Bingham, Butte	2020
30	B	Ben Fuhriman	Republican	Bingham, Butte	2024
31	A	Jerald Raymond (Note: Raymond previously served in the state house from 2018–2020.)	Republican	Clark, Fremont, Jefferson, Lemhi	2022
31	B	Rod Furniss	Republican	Clark, Fremont, Jefferson, Lemhi	2018
32	A	Stephanie Mickelsen	Republican	Bonneville (part)	2022
32	B	Erin Bingham	Republican	Bonneville (part)	2026
33	A	Barbara Ehardt	Republican	Bonneville (part)	2017
33	B	Marco Erickson	Republican	Bonneville (part)	2020
34	A	Jon Weber	Republican	Madison	2020
34	B	Britt Raybould (Note: Raybould previously served in the state house from 2018–2020.)	Republican	Madison	2022
35	A	Mike Veile	Republican	Bannock (part), Bear Lake, Bonneville (part), Caribou, Teton	2025
35	B	Josh Wheeler	Republican	Bannock (part), Bear Lake, Bonneville (part), Caribou, Teton	2022

== See also ==
- Idaho Senate
