= 2020 Idaho House of Representatives election =

- November 3, 2020

All 70 seats in the Idaho House 36 seats needed for a majority
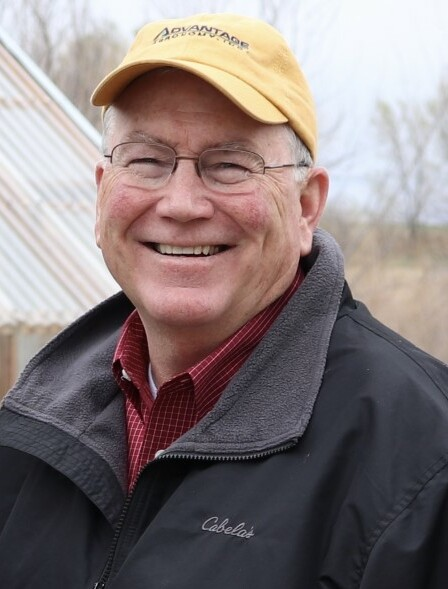

	Majority party	Minority party
Leader	Scott Bedke	Ilana Rubel
Party	Republican	Democratic
Leader since	December 5, 2012	December 10, 2019
Leader's seat	27th Oakley	18th-Boise
Seats before	56	14
Seats after	58	12
Seat change	▲2	▼2
Popular vote	1,125,614	396,678
Percentage	72.12%	25.42%
- Republican gain Democratic hold Republican hold
Speaker of the House before election
Scott Bedke
Republican
Elected Speaker of the House
Scott Bedke
Republican

The 2020 Idaho House of Representatives elections took place as part of the biennial United States elections on November 3, 2020. Idaho voters elected state representatives in all 70 seats of the House, electing 2 state representatives in each of the 35 Idaho state legislative districts. State representatives serve two-year terms in the Idaho House of Representatives.

Following the previous election, Republicans held a 56-to-14-seat majority over Democrats.

Republicans retained control of the Idaho House of Representatives following the 2020 general election and gained two seats with the balance of power shifting to 58 (R) to 12 (D).

== Predictions ==
Source	Ranking	As of
The Cook Political Report	Safe R	October 21, 2020

== Summary of Results ==
Summary of the November 3, 2020 Idaho House of Representatives election results
Party	Votes	%	Seats	+/–	%
Republican Party	1,125,614	72.12%	58	+2	82.86%
Democratic Party	396,678	25.42%	12	-2	17.14%
Libertarian Party	17,441	1.12%	0	–	0%
Independent	12,702	0.81%	0	–	0%
Constitution Party	8,213	0.53%	0	–	0%
Total	1,560,648	100.00%	70	–	

== Closest races ==
Seats where the margin of victory was under 10%:

- District 15
1. Seat A, 2.4%
2. Seat B, 5.2% gain
- District 26
1. Seat B, 9.4%
- District 29
1. Seat A, 7.6% gain

== Summary of Results by House District ==
House District	Seat	Incumbent	Party	Elected Representative	Party
1	A	Heather Scott	Rep	Heather Scott	Rep
1	B	Sage Dixon	Rep	Sage Dixon	Rep
2	A	Vito Barbieri	Rep	Vito Barbieri	Rep
2	B	Tim Remington	Rep	Doug Okuniewicz	Rep
3	A	Ron Mendive	Rep	Ron Mendive	Rep
3	B	Tony Wisniewski	Rep	Tony Wisniewski	Rep
4	A	Jim Addis	Rep	Jim Addis	Rep
4	B	Paul Amador	Rep	Paul Amador	Rep
5	A	Bill Goesling	Rep	Brandon Mitchell	Rep
5	B	Caroline Nilsson Troy	Rep	Caroline Nilsson Troy	Rep
6	A	Aaron von Ehlinger	Rep	Aaron von Ehlinger	Rep
6	B	Mike Kingsley	Rep	Mike Kingsley	Rep
7	A	Priscilla Giddings	Rep	Priscilla Giddings	Rep
7	B	Paul Shepherd	Rep	Charlie Shepherd	Rep
8	A	Terry Gestrin	Rep	Terry Gestrin	Rep
8	B	Dorothy Moon	Rep	Dorothy Moon	Rep
9	A	Ryan Kerby	Rep	Ryan Kerby	Rep
9	B	Judy Boyle	Rep	Judy Boyle	Rep
10	A	Jarom Wagoner	Rep	Julie Yamamoto	Rep
10	B	Gregory Chaney	Rep	Gregory Chaney	Rep
11	A	Scott Syme	Rep	Scott Syme	Rep
11	B	Tammy Nichols	Rep	Tammy Nichols	Rep
12	A	Robert Anderst	Rep	Bruce Skaug	Rep
12	B	Rick Youngblood	Rep	Rick Youngblood	Rep
13	A	Brent Crane	Rep	Brent Crane	Rep
13	B	Gary Collins	Rep	Ben Adams	Rep
14	A	Mike Moyle	Rep	Mike Moyle	Rep
14	B	Gayann DeMordaunt	Rep	Gayann DeMordaunt	Rep
15	A	Steve Berch	Dem	Steve Berch	Dem
15	B	Jake Ellis	Dem	Codi Galloway	Rep
16	A	John McCrostie	Dem	John McCrostie	Dem
16	B	Rob Mason	Dem	Colin Nash	Dem
17	A	John Gannon	Dem	John Gannon	Dem
17	B	Sue Chew	Dem	Sue Chew	Dem
18	A	Ilana Rubel	Dem	Ilana Rubel	Dem
18	B	Brooke Green	Dem	Brooke Green	Dem
19	A	Lauren Necochea	Dem	Lauren Necochea	Dem
19	B	Melissa Wintrow	Dem	Chris Mathias	Dem
20	A	Joe Palmer	Rep	Joe Palmer	Rep
20	B	James Holtzclaw	Rep	James Holtzclaw	Rep
21	A	Steven Harris	Rep	Steven Harris	Rep
21	B	Megan Kiska	Rep	Greg Ferch	Rep
22	A	John Vander Woude	Rep	John Vander Woude	Rep
22	B	Jason Monks	Rep	Jason Monks	Rep
23	A	Christy Zito	Rep	Matthew Bundy	Rep
23	B	Megan Blanksma	Rep	Megan Blanksma	Rep
24	A	Lance Clow	Rep	Lance Clow	Rep
24	B	Linda Wright Hartgen	Rep	Linda Wright Hartgen	Rep
25	A	Laurie Lickley	Rep	Laurie Lickley	Rep
25	B	Clark Kauffman	Rep	Clark Kauffman	Rep
26	A	Marianna Davis	Dem	Marianna Davis	Dem
26	B	Sally Toone	Dem	Sally Toone	Dem
27	A	Scott Bedke	Rep	Scott Bedke	Rep
27	B	Fred Wood	Rep	Fred Wood	Rep
28	A	Randy Armstrong	Rep	Randy Armstrong	Rep
28	B	Kevin Andrus	Rep	Kevin Andrus	Rep
29	A	Chris Abernathy	Dem	Dustin W. Manwaring	Rep
29	B	Elaine Smith	Dem	James Ruchti	Dem
30	A	Gary Marshall	Rep	Gary Marshall	Rep
30	B	Wendy Horman	Rep	Wendy Horman	Rep
31	A	Neil Anderson	Rep	David Cannon	Rep
31	B	Julianne Young	Rep	Julianne Young	Rep
32	A	Marc Gibbs	Rep	Marc Gibbs	Rep
32	B	Chad Christensen	Rep	Chad Christensen	Rep
33	A	Barbara Ehardt	Rep	Barbara Ehardt	Rep
33	B	Bryan Zollinger	Rep	Marco Erickson	Rep
34	A	Doug Ricks	Rep	Jon Weber	Rep
34	B	Britt Raybould	Rep	Ronald M. Nate	Rep
35	A	Jerald Raymond	Rep	Karey Hanks	Rep
35	B	Rod Furniss	Rep	Rod Furniss	Rep

== Detailed Results by House District ==
- Note: Official primary results can be obtained here and official general election results here.

=== District 1 ===
Seat A

Idaho Legislative District 1 House Seat A Republican Primary Election, 2020
Party	Candidate	Votes	%
Idaho Republican Party	Heather Scott (incumbent)	6,642	100.0
Total votes		6,642	100.0

Idaho Legislative District 1 House Seat A Democratic Primary Election, 2020
Party	Candidate	Votes	%
Democratic	Gail Bolin	2,285	100.0
Total votes		2,285	100.0

Idaho Legislative District 1 House Seat A General Election, 2020
Party	Candidate	Votes	%
Idaho Republican Party	Heather Scott (incumbent)	19,662	68.0
Democratic	Gail Bolin	9,245	32.0
Total votes		28,907	100.0
Idaho Republican Party hold			

Seat B

Idaho Legislative District 1 House Seat B Republican Primary Election, 2020
Party	Candidate	Votes	%
Idaho Republican Party	Sage G. Dixon (incumbent)	6,738	77.9
Idaho Republican Party	Gary Suppiger	1,910	22.1
Total votes		8,648	100.0

Idaho Legislative District 1 House Seat B Democratic Primary Election, 2020
Party	Candidate	Votes	%
Democratic	Stephen F. Howlett	2,285	100.0
Total votes		2,285	100.0

Idaho Legislative District 1 House Seat B General Election, 2020
Party	Candidate	Votes	%
Idaho Republican Party	Sage G. Dixon (incumbent)	20,212	69.5
Democratic	Stephen F. Howlett	8,113	27.9
Independent	Dan Rose	751	2.6
Total votes		29,076	100.0
Idaho Republican Party hold			

=== District 2 ===
Seat A

Idaho Legislative District 2 House Seat A Republican Primary Election, 2020
Party	Candidate	Votes	%
Idaho Republican Party	Vito Barbieri (incumbent)	6,843	75.2
Idaho Republican Party	Russell J. McLain	2,259	24.8
Total votes		9,102	100.0

Idaho Legislative District 2 House Seat A General Election, 2020
Party	Candidate	Votes	%
Idaho Republican Party	Vito Barbieri (incumbent)	25,827	100.0
Total votes		25,827	100.0
Idaho Republican Party hold			

Seat B

Idaho Legislative District 2 House Seat B Republican Primary Election, 2020
Party	Candidate	Votes	%
Idaho Republican Party	Doug "Doug O" Okuniewicz	4,878	52.8
Idaho Republican Party	Tim Kastning	4,359	47.2
Total votes		9,237	100.0

Idaho Legislative District 2 House Seat B General Election, 2020
Party	Candidate	Votes	%
Idaho Republican Party	Doug "Doug O" Okuniewicz	24,273	83.5
Libertarian	Jennifer Luoma	4,803	16.5
Total votes		29,076	100.0
Idaho Republican Party hold			

=== District 3 ===
Seat A

Idaho Legislative District 3 House Seat A Republican Primary Election, 2020
Party	Candidate	Votes	%
Idaho Republican Party	Ron Mendive (incumbent)	6,244	100.0
Total votes		6,244	100.0

Idaho Legislative District 3 House Seat A Democratic Primary Election, 2020
Party	Candidate	Votes	%
Democratic	Christopher S. Matthews	1,614	100.0
Total votes		1,614	100.0

Idaho Legislative District 3 House Seat A General Election, 2020
Party	Candidate	Votes	%
Idaho Republican Party	Ron Mendive (incumbent)	21,602	76.1
Democratic	Christopher S. Matthews	6,789	23.9
Total votes		28,391	100.0
Idaho Republican Party hold			

Seat B

Idaho Legislative District 3 House Seat B Republican Primary Election, 2020
Party	Candidate	Votes	%
Idaho Republican Party	Tony Wisniewski (incumbent)	6,154	100.0
Total votes		6,154	100.0

Idaho Legislative District 3 House Seat B Democratic Primary Election, 2020
Party	Candidate	Votes	%
Democratic	Teresa Borrenpohl	1,648	100.0
Total votes		1,648	100.0

Idaho Legislative District 3 House Seat B General Election, 2020
Party	Candidate	Votes	%
Idaho Republican Party	Tony Wisniewski (incumbent)	21,536	75.7
Democratic	Teresa Borrenpohl	6,901	24.3
Total votes		28,437	100.0
Idaho Republican Party hold			

=== District 4 ===
Seat A

Idaho Legislative District 4 House Seat A Republican Primary Election, 2020
Party	Candidate	Votes	%
Idaho Republican Party	Jim Addis (incumbent)	4,901	86.9
Idaho Republican Party	Pat "Mitch" Mitchell	737	13.1
Total votes		5,638	100.0

Idaho Legislative District 4 House Seat A General Election, 2020
Party	Candidate	Votes	%
Idaho Republican Party	Jim Addis (incumbent)	21,433	100.0
Total votes		21,433	100.0
Idaho Republican Party hold			

Seat B

Idaho Legislative District 4 House Seat B Republican Primary Election, 2020
Party	Candidate	Votes	%
Idaho Republican Party	Paul Amador (incumbent)	5,298	100.0
Total votes		5,298	100.0

Idaho Legislative District 4 House Seat B General Election, 2020
Party	Candidate	Votes	%
Idaho Republican Party	Paul Amador (incumbent)	21,694	100.0
Total votes		21,694	100.0
Idaho Republican Party hold			

=== District 5 ===
Seat A

Idaho Legislative District 5 House Seat A Republican Primary Election, 2020
Party	Candidate	Votes	%
Idaho Republican Party	Brandon Mitchell	2,883	57.8
Idaho Republican Party	Hari Heath	2,107	42.2
Total votes		4,990	100.0

Idaho Legislative District 5 House Seat A Democratic Primary Election, 2020
Party	Candidate	Votes	%
Democratic	Dulce Kersting-Lark	3,551	100.0
Total votes		3,551	100.0

Idaho Legislative District 5 House Seat A General Election, 2020
Party	Candidate	Votes	%
Idaho Republican Party	Brandon Mitchell	13,888	55.4
Democratic	Dulce Kersting-Lark	11,180	44.6
Total votes		25,068	100.0
Idaho Republican Party hold			

Seat B

Idaho Legislative District 5 House Seat B Republican Primary Election, 2020
Party	Candidate	Votes	%
Idaho Republican Party	Caroline Nilsson Troy (incumbent)	4,556	100.0
Total votes		4,556	100.0

Idaho Legislative District 5 House Seat B Democratic Primary Election, 2020
Party	Candidate	Votes	%
Democratic	Renee Love	3,506	100.0
Total votes		3,506	100.0

Idaho Legislative District 5 House Seat B General Election, 2020
Party	Candidate	Votes	%
Idaho Republican Party	Caroline Nilsson Troy (incumbent)	13,979	55.4
Democratic	Renee Love	10,315	40.9
Constitution	James Hartley	943	3.7
Total votes		25,237	100.0
Idaho Republican Party hold			

=== District 6 ===
Seat A

Idaho Legislative District 6 House Seat A Republican Primary Election, 2020
Party	Candidate	Votes	%
Idaho Republican Party	Aaron von Ehlinger (incumbent)	4,157	78.1
Idaho Republican Party	Thyra Stevenson	1,169	21.9
Total votes		5,326	100.0

Idaho Legislative District 6 House Seat A General Election, 2020
Party	Candidate	Votes	%
Idaho Republican Party	Aaron von Ehlinger (incumbent)	18,909	100.0
Total votes		18,909	100.0
Idaho Republican Party hold			

Seat B

Idaho Legislative District 6 House Seat B Republican Primary Election, 2020
Party	Candidate	Votes	%
Idaho Republican Party	Mike Kingsley (incumbent)	4,980	100.0
Total votes		4,980	100.0

Idaho Legislative District 6 House Seat B General Election, 2020
Party	Candidate	Votes	%
Idaho Republican Party	Mike Kingsley (incumbent)	18,879	100.0
Total votes		18,879	100.0
Idaho Republican Party hold			

=== District 7 ===
Seat A

Idaho Legislative District 7 House Seat A Republican Primary Election, 2020
Party	Candidate	Votes	%
Idaho Republican Party	Priscilla Giddings (incumbent)	5,018	56.4
Idaho Republican Party	Dennis Harper	3,875	43.6
Total votes		8,893	100.0

Idaho Legislative District 7 House Seat A General Election, 2020
Party	Candidate	Votes	%
Idaho Republican Party	Priscilla Giddings (incumbent)	19,117	100.0
Total votes		19,117	100.0
Idaho Republican Party hold			

Seat B

Idaho Legislative District 7 House Seat B Republican Primary Election, 2020
Party	Candidate	Votes	%
Idaho Republican Party	Charlie Shepherd	4,414	52.1
Idaho Republican Party	Cornel Rasor	4,051	47.9
Total votes		8,465	100.0

Idaho Legislative District 7 House Seat B General Election, 2020
Party	Candidate	Votes	%
Idaho Republican Party	Charlie Shepherd	19,401	100.0
Total votes		19,401	100.0
Idaho Republican Party hold			

=== District 8 ===
Seat A

Idaho Legislative District 8 House Seat A Republican Primary Election, 2020
Party	Candidate	Votes	%
Idaho Republican Party	Terry Gestrin (incumbent)	9,918	100.0
Total votes		9,918	100.0

Idaho Legislative District 8 House Seat A General Election, 2020
Party	Candidate	Votes	%
Idaho Republican Party	Terry Gestrin (incumbent)	23,661	100.0
Total votes		23,661	100.0
Idaho Republican Party hold			

Seat B

Idaho Legislative District 8 House Seat B Republican Primary Election, 2020
Party	Candidate	Votes	%
Idaho Republican Party	Dorothy Moon (incumbent)	7,279	63.6
Idaho Republican Party	LaVerne Sessions	4,163	36.4
Total votes		11,442	100.0

Idaho Legislative District 8 House Seat B General Election, 2020
Party	Candidate	Votes	%
Idaho Republican Party	Dorothy Moon (incumbent)	23,300	100.0
Total votes		23,300	100.0
Idaho Republican Party hold			

=== District 9 ===
Seat A

Idaho Legislative District 9 House Seat A Republican Primary Election, 2020
Party	Candidate	Votes	%
Idaho Republican Party	Ryan Kerby (incumbent)	5,059	63.8
Idaho Republican Party	Jim Smith	2,873	36.2
Total votes		7,932	100.0

Idaho Legislative District 9 House Seat A General Election, 2020
Party	Candidate	Votes	%
Idaho Republican Party	Ryan Kerby (incumbent)	20,008	100.0
Total votes		20,008	100.0
Idaho Republican Party hold			

Seat B

Idaho Legislative District 9 House Seat B Republican Primary Election, 2020
Party	Candidate	Votes	%
Idaho Republican Party	Judy Boyle (incumbent)	7,073	100.0
Total votes		7,073	100.0

Idaho Legislative District 9 House Seat B Democratic Primary Election, 2020
Party	Candidate	Votes	%
Democratic	Allen Schmid	1,129	100.0
Total votes		1,129	100.0

Idaho Legislative District 9 House Seat B General Election, 2020
Party	Candidate	Votes	%
Idaho Republican Party	Judy Boyle (incumbent)	17,678	78.4
Democratic	Allen Schmid	4,882	21.6
Total votes		22,560	100.0
Idaho Republican Party hold			

=== District 10 ===
Seat A

Idaho Legislative District 10 House Seat A Republican Primary Election, 2020
Party	Candidate	Votes	%
Idaho Republican Party	Julie Yamamoto	2,194	58.3
Idaho Republican Party	Jarom Wagoner (incumbent)	1,571	41.7
Total votes		3,765	100.0

Idaho Legislative District 10 House Seat A Democratic Primary Election, 2020
Party	Candidate	Votes	%
Democratic	Rebecca Yamamoto Hanson	1,211	100.0
Total votes		1,211	100.0

Idaho Legislative District 10 House Seat A General Election, 2020
Party	Candidate	Votes	%
Idaho Republican Party	Julie Yamamoto	11,854	67.4
Democratic	Rebecca Yamamoto Hanson	5,722	32.6
Total votes		17,576	100.0
Idaho Republican Party hold			

Seat B

Idaho Legislative District 10 House Seat B Republican Primary Election, 2020
Party	Candidate	Votes	%
Idaho Republican Party	Greg Chaney (incumbent)	3,326	100.0
Total votes		3,326	100.0

Idaho Legislative District 10 House Seat B Democratic Primary Election, 2020
Party	Candidate	Votes	%
Democratic	Chelsea Gaona-Lincoln	1,209	100.0
Total votes		1,209	100.0

Idaho Legislative District 10 House Seat B General Election, 2020
Party	Candidate	Votes	%
Idaho Republican Party	Greg Chaney (incumbent)	11,375	65.4
Democratic	Chelsea Gaona-Lincoln	6,019	34.6
Total votes		17,394	100.0
Idaho Republican Party hold			

=== District 11 ===
Seat A

Idaho Legislative District 11 House Seat A Republican Primary Election, 2020
Party	Candidate	Votes	%
Idaho Republican Party	Scott Syme (incumbent)	5,458	67.2
Idaho Republican Party	Mila Wood	2,659	32.8
Total votes		8,117	100.0

Idaho Legislative District 11 House Seat A Democratic Primary Election, 2020
Party	Candidate	Votes	%
Democratic	Jacob Lowder	1,235	100.0
Total votes		1,235	100.0

Idaho Legislative District 11 House Seat A General Election, 2020
Party	Candidate	Votes	%
Idaho Republican Party	Scott Syme (incumbent)	19,087	80.6
Democratic	Jacob Lowder	4,596	19.4
Total votes		23,683	100.0
Idaho Republican Party hold			

Seat B

Idaho Legislative District 11 House Seat B Republican Primary Election, 2020
Party	Candidate	Votes	%
Idaho Republican Party	Tammy Nichols (incumbent)	4,782	59.1
Idaho Republican Party	Kirk L. Adams	3,313	40.9
Total votes		8,095	100.0

Idaho Legislative District 11 House Seat B Democratic Primary Election, 2020
Party	Candidate	Votes	%
Democratic	Edward Savala	1,245	100.0
Total votes		1,245	100.0

Idaho Legislative District 11 House Seat B General Election, 2020
Party	Candidate	Votes	%
Idaho Republican Party	Tammy Nichols (incumbent)	18,866	79.8
Democratic	Edward Savala	4,770	20.2
Total votes		23,636	100.0
Idaho Republican Party hold			

=== District 12 ===
Seat A

Idaho Legislative District 12 House Seat A Republican Primary Election, 2020
Party	Candidate	Votes	%
Idaho Republican Party	Bruce Skaug	4,001	100.0
Total votes		4,001	100.0

Idaho Legislative District 12 House Seat A Democratic Primary Election, 2020
Party	Candidate	Votes	%
Democratic	Pat Day Hartwell	1,453	100.0
Total votes		1,453	100.0

Idaho Legislative District 12 House Seat A General Election, 2020
Party	Candidate	Votes	%
Idaho Republican Party	Bruce D. Skaug	14,274	69.1
Democratic	Pat Day Hartwell	6,369	30.9
Total votes		20,643	100.0
Idaho Republican Party hold			

Seat B

Idaho Legislative District 12 House Seat B Republican Primary Election, 2020
Party	Candidate	Votes	%
Idaho Republican Party	Rick D. Youngblood (incumbent)	3,219	73.7
Idaho Republican Party	Machele Hamilton	1,146	26.3
Total votes		4,365	100.0

Idaho Legislative District 12 House Seat B General Election, 2020
Party	Candidate	Votes	%
Idaho Republican Party	Rick D. Youngblood (incumbent)	17,278	99.8
Independent	Michael H. Angel	28	0.2
Total votes		17,306	100.0
Idaho Republican Party hold			

=== District 13 ===
Seat A

Idaho Legislative District 13 House Seat A Republican Primary Election, 2020
Party	Candidate	Votes	%
Idaho Republican Party	Brent J. Crane (incumbent)	4,968	100.0
Total votes		4,968	100.0

Idaho Legislative District 13 House Seat A Democratic Primary Election, 2020
Party	Candidate	Votes	%
Democratic	Jason Kutchma	1,505	100.0
Total votes		1,505	100.0

Idaho Legislative District 13 House Seat A General Election, 2020
Party	Candidate	Votes	%
Idaho Republican Party	Brent J. Crane (incumbent)	15,068	70.0
Democratic	Jason Kutchma	6,473	30.0
Total votes		21,541	100.0
Idaho Republican Party hold			

Seat B

Idaho Legislative District 13 House Seat B Republican Primary Election, 2020
Party	Candidate	Votes	%
Idaho Republican Party	Ben Adams	2,712	49.3
Idaho Republican Party	Kim B. Keller	1,607	29.2
Idaho Republican Party	Kenny Wroten	622	11.3
Idaho Republican Party	Randy Jackson	560	10.2
Total votes		5,501	100.0

Idaho Legislative District 13 House Seat B General Election, 2020
Party	Candidate	Votes	%
Idaho Republican Party	Ben Adams	15,562	77.7
Libertarian	Jess S. Smith	4,460	22.3
Total votes		20,022	100.0
Idaho Republican Party hold			

=== District 14 ===
Seat A

Idaho Legislative District 14 House Seat A Republican Primary Election, 2020
Party	Candidate	Votes	%
Idaho Republican Party	Mike Moyle (incumbent)	9,618	100.0
Total votes		9,618	100.0

Idaho Legislative District 14 House Seat A General Election, 2020
Party	Candidate	Votes	%
Idaho Republican Party	Mike Moyle (incumbent)	28,605	71.2
Independent	Cindy Currie	11,591	28.8
Total votes		40,196	100.0
Idaho Republican Party hold			

Seat B

Idaho Legislative District 14 House Seat B Republican Primary Election, 2020
Party	Candidate	Votes	%
Idaho Republican Party	Gayann DeMordaunt (incumbent)	6,041	57.7
Idaho Republican Party	Josh Tanner	4,421	42.3
Total votes		10,462	100.0

Idaho Legislative District 14 House Seat B Democratic Primary Election, 2020
Party	Candidate	Votes	%
Democratic	Shelley Brock	3,258	100.0
Total votes		3,258	100.0

Idaho Legislative District 14 House Seat B General Election, 2020
Party	Candidate	Votes	%
Idaho Republican Party	Gayann DeMordaunt (incumbent)	28,659	70.4
Democratic	Shelley Brock	12,063	29.6
Total votes		40,722	100.0
Idaho Republican Party hold			

=== District 15 ===
Seat A

Idaho Legislative District 15 House Seat A Republican Primary Election, 2020
Party	Candidate	Votes	%
Idaho Republican Party	Patrick E. McDonald	3,960	100.0
Total votes		3,960	100.0

Idaho Legislative District 15 House Seat A Democratic Primary Election, 2020
Party	Candidate	Votes	%
Democratic	Steve Berch (incumbent)	3,153	100.0
Total votes		3,153	100.0

Idaho Legislative District 15 House Seat A General Election, 2020
Party	Candidate	Votes	%
Democratic	Steve Berch (incumbent)	11,567	50.6
Idaho Republican Party	Patrick E. McDonald	10,933	47.8
Constitution	David W. Hartigan	365	1.6
Total votes		22,865	100.0
Democratic hold			

Seat B

Idaho Legislative District 15 House Seat B Republican Primary Election, 2020
Party	Candidate	Votes	%
Idaho Republican Party	Codi Galloway	3,832	100.0
Total votes		3,832	100.0

Idaho Legislative District 15 House Seat B Democratic Primary Election, 2020
Party	Candidate	Votes	%
Democratic	Jake Ellis (incumbent)	3,084	100.0
Total votes		3,084	100.0

Idaho Legislative District 15 House Seat B General Election, 2020
Party	Candidate	Votes	%
Idaho Republican Party	Codi Galloway	11,975	52.6
Democratic	Jake Ellis (incumbent)	10,785	47.4
Total votes		22,760	100.0
Idaho Republican Party gain from Democratic			

=== District 16 ===
Seat A

Idaho Legislative District 16 House Seat A Democratic Primary Election, 2020
Party	Candidate	Votes	%
Democratic	John McCrostie (incumbent)	4,365	100.0
Total votes		4,365	100.0

Idaho Legislative District 16 House Seat A General Election, 2020
Party	Candidate	Votes	%
Democratic	John McCrostie (incumbent)	17,150	98.1
Independent	Chandler S. Hadrabet	332	1.9
Total votes		17,482	100.0
Democratic hold			

Seat B

Idaho Legislative District 16 House Seat B Republican Primary Election, 2020
Party	Candidate	Votes	%
Idaho Republican Party	Jacquelyn (Jackie) Davidson	2,784	100.0
Total votes		2,784	100.0

Idaho Legislative District 16 House Seat B Democratic Primary Election, 2020
Party	Candidate	Votes	%
Democratic	Colin Nash	3,890	82.3
Democratic	Geoff Stephenson	838	17.7
Total votes		4,728	100.0

Idaho Legislative District 16 House Seat B General Election, 2020
Party	Candidate	Votes	%
Democratic	Colin Nash	14,114	58.4
Idaho Republican Party	Jacquelyn (Jackie) Davidson	10,052	41.6
Total votes		24,166	100.0
Democratic hold			

=== District 17 ===
Seat A

Idaho Legislative District 17 House Seat A Republican Primary Election, 2020
Party	Candidate	Votes	%
Idaho Republican Party	Brittany Love	1,918	100.0
Total votes		1,918	100.0

Idaho Legislative District 17 House Seat A Democratic Primary Election, 2020
Party	Candidate	Votes	%
Democratic	John Gannon (incumbent)	3,832	100.0
Total votes		3,832	100.0

Idaho Legislative District 17 House Seat A General Election, 2020
Party	Candidate	Votes	%
Democratic	John Gannon (incumbent)	13,195	63.4
Idaho Republican Party	Brittany Love	7,604	36.6
Total votes		20,799	100.0
Democratic hold			

Seat B

Idaho Legislative District 17 House Seat B Republican Primary Election, 2020
Party	Candidate	Votes	%
Idaho Republican Party	Anthony T. Dephue	1,865	100.0
Total votes		1,865	100.0

Idaho Legislative District 17 House Seat B Democratic Primary Election, 2020
Party	Candidate	Votes	%
Democratic	Sue Chew (incumbent)	3,917	100.0
Total votes		3,917	100.0

Idaho Legislative District 17 House Seat B General Election, 2020
Party	Candidate	Votes	%
Democratic	Sue Chew (incumbent)	13,751	66.0
Idaho Republican Party	Anthony T. Dephue	7,079	34.0
Total votes		20,830	100.0
Democratic hold			

=== District 18 ===
Seat A

Idaho Legislative District 18 House Seat A Republican Primary Election, 2020
Party	Candidate	Votes	%
Idaho Republican Party	Gary M. Childe	3,082	100.0
Total votes		3,082	100.0

Idaho Legislative District 18 House Seat A Democratic Primary Election, 2020
Party	Candidate	Votes	%
Democratic	Ilana Rubel (incumbent)	5,093	100.0
Total votes		5,093	100.0

Idaho Legislative District 18 House Seat A General Election, 2020
Party	Candidate	Votes	%
Democratic	Ilana Rubel (incumbent)	17,645	61.2
Idaho Republican Party	Gary M. Childe	11,186	38.8
Total votes		28,831	100.0
Democratic hold			

Seat B

Idaho Legislative District 18 House Seat B Republican Primary Election, 2020
Party	Candidate	Votes	%
Idaho Republican Party	Pete Thomas	3,044	100.0
Total votes		3,044	100.0

Idaho Legislative District 18 House Seat B Democratic Primary Election, 2020
Party	Candidate	Votes	%
Democratic	Brooke Green (incumbent)	4,965	100.0
Total votes		4,965	100.0

Idaho Legislative District 18 House Seat B General Election, 2020
Party	Candidate	Votes	%
Democratic	Brooke Green (incumbent)	17,339	60.7
Idaho Republican Party	Pete Thomas	11,241	39.3
Total votes		28,580	100.0
Democratic hold			

=== District 19 ===
Seat A

Idaho Legislative District 19 House Seat A Republican Primary Election, 2020
Party	Candidate	Votes	%
Idaho Republican Party	Jim Feederle	2,531	100.0
Total votes		2,531	100.0

Idaho Legislative District 19 House Seat A Democratic Primary Election, 2020
Party	Candidate	Votes	%
Democratic	Lauren Necochea (incumbent)	6,937	100.0
Total votes		6,937	100.0

Idaho Legislative District 19 House Seat A General Election, 2020
Party	Candidate	Votes	%
Democratic	Lauren Necochea (incumbent)	21,358	68.8
Idaho Republican Party	Jim Feederle	9,768	31.2
Total votes		31,126	100.0
Democratic hold			

Seat B

Idaho Legislative District 19 House Seat B Republican Primary Election, 2020
Party	Candidate	Votes	%
Idaho Republican Party	James F. Jacobson	1,657	62.6
Idaho Republican Party	Gary Parent II	988	37.4
Total votes		2,645	100.0

Idaho Legislative District 19 House Seat B Democratic Primary Election, 2020
Party	Candidate	Votes	%
Democratic	Chris Mathias	5,244	64.0
Democratic	Jeff Gabica	2,104	25.7
Democratic	Charlene Y. Taylor	842	10.3
Total votes		8,190	100.0

Idaho Legislative District 19 House Seat B General Election, 2020
Party	Candidate	Votes	%
Democratic	Chris Mathias	20,940	67.8
Idaho Republican Party	James F. Jacobson	9,948	32.2
Total votes		30,888	100.0
Democratic hold			

=== District 20 ===
Seat A

Idaho Legislative District 20 House Seat A Republican Primary Election, 2020
Party	Candidate	Votes	%
Idaho Republican Party	Joe A. Palmer (incumbent)	4,429	75.7
Idaho Republican Party	Dawn Maglish	1,418	24.3
Total votes		5,847	100.0

Idaho Legislative District 20 House Seat A Democratic Primary Election, 2020
Party	Candidate	Votes	%
Democratic	Pat Soulliere	2,375	100.0
Total votes		2,375	100.0

Idaho Legislative District 20 House Seat A General Election, 2020
Party	Candidate	Votes	%
Idaho Republican Party	Joe A. Palmer (incumbent)	16,795	62.4
Democratic	Pat Soulliere	9,301	34.6
Constitution	Daniel S. Weston	804	3.0
Total votes		26,900	100.0
Idaho Republican Party hold			

Seat B

Idaho Legislative District 20 House Seat B Republican Primary Election, 2020
Party	Candidate	Votes	%
Idaho Republican Party	James Holtzclaw (incumbent)	5,200	100.0
Total votes		5,200	100.0

Idaho Legislative District 20 House Seat B Democratic Primary Election, 2020
Party	Candidate	Votes	%
Democratic	Samantha "Sammy" Hager	2,358	100.0
Total votes		2,358	100.0

Idaho Legislative District 20 House Seat B General Election, 2020
Party	Candidate	Votes	%
Idaho Republican Party	James Holtzclaw (incumbent)	17,488	65.7
Democratic	Samantha "Sammy" Hager	9,120	34.3
Total votes		26,608	100.0
Idaho Republican Party hold			

=== District 21 ===
Seat A

Idaho Legislative District 21 House Seat A Republican Primary Election, 2020
Party	Candidate	Votes	%
Idaho Republican Party	Steven C. Harris (incumbent)	5,670	100.0
Total votes		5,670	100.0

Idaho Legislative District 21 House Seat A Democratic Primary Election, 2020
Party	Candidate	Votes	%
Democratic	Donald Williamson	2,847	100.0
Total votes		2,847	100.0

Idaho Legislative District 21 House Seat A General Election, 2020
Party	Candidate	Votes	%
Idaho Republican Party	Steven C. Harris (incumbent)	19,731	63.7
Democratic	Donald Williamson	11,249	36.3
Total votes		30,980	100.0
Idaho Republican Party hold			

Seat B

Idaho Legislative District 21 House Seat B Republican Primary Election, 2020
Party	Candidate	Votes	%
Idaho Republican Party	Greg Ferch	3,053	49.4
Idaho Republican Party	Brenda Palmer	1,874	30.3
Idaho Republican Party	Eli Hodson	1,250	20.3
Total votes		6,177	100.0

Idaho Legislative District 21 House Seat B General Election, 2020
Party	Candidate	Votes	%
Idaho Republican Party	Greg Ferch	20,509	71.5
Libertarian	Lisa Adams	8,178	28.5
Total votes		28,687	100.0
Idaho Republican Party hold			

=== District 22 ===
Seat A

Idaho Legislative District 22 House Seat A Republican Primary Election, 2020
Party	Candidate	Votes	%
Idaho Republican Party	John Vander Woude (incumbent)	3,575	69.8
Idaho Republican Party	Chris Bruce	1,550	30.2
Total votes		5,125	100.0

Idaho Legislative District 22 House Seat A Democratic Primary Election, 2020
Party	Candidate	Votes	%
Democratic	Diane Jensen	1,552	100.0
Total votes		1,552	100.0

Idaho Legislative District 22 House Seat A General Election, 2020
Party	Candidate	Votes	%
Idaho Republican Party	John Vander Woude (incumbent)	17,451	72.1
Democratic	Diane Jensen	6,739	27.9
Total votes		24,190	100.0
Idaho Republican Party hold			

Seat B

Idaho Legislative District 22 House Seat B Republican Primary Election, 2020
Party	Candidate	Votes	%
Idaho Republican Party	Jason A. Monks (incumbent)	3,166	61.5
Idaho Republican Party	Heidi Sorenson	1,981	38.5
Total votes		5,147	100.0

Idaho Legislative District 22 House Seat B Democratic Primary Election, 2020
Party	Candidate	Votes	%
Democratic	Nina Turner	1,540	100.0
Total votes		1,540	100.0

Idaho Legislative District 22 House Seat B General Election, 2020
Party	Candidate	Votes	%
Idaho Republican Party	Jason A. Monks (incumbent)	17,547	73.2
Democratic	Nina Turner	6,431	26.8
Total votes		23,978	100.0
Idaho Republican Party hold			

=== District 23 ===
Seat A

Idaho Legislative District 23 House Seat A Republican Primary Election, 2020
Party	Candidate	Votes	%
Idaho Republican Party	Matthew Bundy	3,723	55.9
Idaho Republican Party	Andrea Owens	2,936	44.1
Total votes		6,659	100.0

Idaho Legislative District 23 House Seat A Democratic Primary Election, 2020
Party	Candidate	Votes	%
Democratic	Benjamin Lee	979	100.0
Total votes		979	100.0

Idaho Legislative District 23 House Seat A General Election, 2020
Party	Candidate	Votes	%
Idaho Republican Party	Matthew Bundy	13,574	79.2
Democratic	Benjamin Lee	3,574	20.8
Total votes		17,148	100.0
Idaho Republican Party hold			

Seat B

Idaho Legislative District 23 House Seat B Republican Primary Election, 2020
Party	Candidate	Votes	%
Idaho Republican Party	Megan C. Blanksma (incumbent)	6,112	100.0
Total votes		6,112	100.0

Idaho Legislative District 23 House Seat B Democratic Primary Election, 2020
Party	Candidate	Votes	%
Democratic	Michael Oliver	978	100.0
Total votes		978	100.0

Idaho Legislative District 23 House Seat B General Election, 2020
Party	Candidate	Votes	%
Idaho Republican Party	Megan C. Blanksma (incumbent)	12,941	74.6
Democratic	Michael Oliver	3,234	18.6
Constitution	Tony Ullrich	1,186	6.8
Total votes		17,361	100.0
Idaho Republican Party hold			

=== District 24 ===
Seat A

Idaho Legislative District 24 House Seat A Republican Primary Election, 2020
Party	Candidate	Votes	%
Idaho Republican Party	Lance Clow (incumbent)	4,168	100.0
Total votes		4,168	100.0

Idaho Legislative District 24 House Seat A General Election, 2020
Party	Candidate	Votes	%
Idaho Republican Party	Lance Clow (incumbent)	13,833	73.8
Constitution	Paul Thompson	4,915	26.2
Total votes		18,748	100.0
Idaho Republican Party hold			

Seat B

Idaho Legislative District 24 House Seat B Republican Primary Election, 2020
Party	Candidate	Votes	%
Idaho Republican Party	Linda Wright Hartgen (incumbent)	4,180	100.0
Total votes		4,180	100.0

Idaho Legislative District 24 House Seat B General Election, 2020
Party	Candidate	Votes	%
Idaho Republican Party	Linda Wright Hartgen (incumbent)	16,298	100.0
Total votes		16,298	100.0
Idaho Republican Party hold			

=== District 25 ===
Seat A

Idaho Legislative District 25 House Seat A Republican Primary Election, 2020
Party	Candidate	Votes	%
Idaho Republican Party	Laurie Lickley (incumbent)	5,578	100.0
Total votes		5,578	100.0

Idaho Legislative District 25 House Seat A General Election, 2020
Party	Candidate	Votes	%
Idaho Republican Party	Laurie Lickley (incumbent)	17,279	100.0
Total votes		17,279	100.0
Idaho Republican Party hold			

Seat B

Idaho Legislative District 25 House Seat B Republican Primary Election, 2020
Party	Candidate	Votes	%
Idaho Republican Party	Clark Kauffman (incumbent)	5,547	100.0
Total votes		5,547	100.0

Idaho Legislative District 25 House Seat B General Election, 2020
Party	Candidate	Votes	%
Idaho Republican Party	Clark Kauffman (incumbent)	17,264	100.0
Total votes		17,264	100.0
Idaho Republican Party hold			

=== District 26 ===
Seat A

Idaho Legislative District 26 House Seat A Democratic Primary Election, 2020
Party	Candidate	Votes	%
Democratic	Muffy Davis (incumbent)	3,125	100.0
Total votes		3,125	100.0

Idaho Legislative District 26 House Seat A General Election, 2020
Party	Candidate	Votes	%
Democratic	Muffy Davis (incumbent)	16,059	100.0
Total votes		16,059	100.0
Democratic hold			

Seat B

Idaho Legislative District 26 House Seat B Republican Primary Election, 2020
Party	Candidate	Votes	%
Idaho Republican Party	William K. Thorpe	3,706	100.0
Total votes		3,706	100.0

Idaho Legislative District 26 House Seat B Democratic Primary Election, 2020
Party	Candidate	Votes	%
Democratic	Sally J. Toone (incumbent)	3,039	100.0
Total votes		3,039	100.0

Idaho Legislative District 26 House Seat B General Election, 2020
Party	Candidate	Votes	%
Democratic	Sally J. Toone (incumbent)	11,888	54.7
Idaho Republican Party	William K. Thorpe	9,845	45.3
Total votes		21,733	100.0
Democratic hold			

=== District 27 ===
Seat A

Idaho Legislative District 27 House Seat A Republican Primary Election, 2020
Party	Candidate	Votes	%
Idaho Republican Party	Scott Bedke (incumbent)	5,071	100.0
Total votes		5,071	100.0

Idaho Legislative District 27 House Seat A General Election, 2020
Party	Candidate	Votes	%
Idaho Republican Party	Scott Bedke (incumbent)	15,882	100.0
Total votes		15,882	100.0
Idaho Republican Party hold			

Seat B

Idaho Legislative District 27 House Seat B Republican Primary Election, 2020
Party	Candidate	Votes	%
Idaho Republican Party	Fred Wood (incumbent)	5,090	100.0
Total votes		5,090	100.0

Idaho Legislative District 27 House Seat B General Election, 2020
Party	Candidate	Votes	%
Idaho Republican Party	Fred Wood (incumbent)	15,745	100.0
Total votes		15,745	100.0
Idaho Republican Party hold			

=== District 28 ===
Seat A

Idaho Legislative District 28 House Seat A Republican Primary Election, 2020
Party	Candidate	Votes	%
Idaho Republican Party	Randy Armstrong (incumbent)	4,671	100.0
Total votes		4,671	100.0

Idaho Legislative District 28 House Seat A Democratic Primary Election, 2020
Party	Candidate	Votes	%
Democratic	Mike Saville	1,982	100.0
Total votes		1,982	100.0

Idaho Legislative District 28 House Seat A General Election, 2020
Party	Candidate	Votes	%
Idaho Republican Party	Randy Armstrong (incumbent)	15,331	67.3
Democratic	Mike Saville	7,466	32.7
Total votes		22,797	100.0
Idaho Republican Party hold			

Seat B

Idaho Legislative District 28 House Seat B Republican Primary Election, 2020
Party	Candidate	Votes	%
Idaho Republican Party	Kevin Andrus (incumbent)	4,757	100.0
Total votes		4,757	100.0

Idaho Legislative District 28 House Seat B General Election, 2020
Party	Candidate	Votes	%
Idaho Republican Party	Kevin Andrus (incumbent)	19,683	100.0
Total votes		19,683	100.0
Idaho Republican Party hold			

=== District 29 ===
Seat A

Idaho Legislative District 29 House Seat A Republican Primary Election, 2020
Party	Candidate	Votes	%
Idaho Republican Party	Dustin Whitney Manwaring	2,240	100.0
Total votes		2,240	100.0

Idaho Legislative District 29 House Seat A Democratic Primary Election, 2020
Party	Candidate	Votes	%
Democratic	Chris Abernathy (incumbent)	2,480	100.0
Total votes		2,480	100.0

Idaho Legislative District 29 House Seat A General Election, 2020
Party	Candidate	Votes	%
Idaho Republican Party	Dustin Whitney Manwaring	10,181	53.8
Democratic	Chris Abernathy (incumbent)	8,753	46.2
Total votes		18,934	100.0
Idaho Republican Party gain from Democratic			

Seat B

Idaho Legislative District 29 House Seat B Democratic Primary Election, 2020
Party	Candidate	Votes	%
Democratic	James D. Ruchti	2,501	100.0
Total votes		2,501	100.0

Idaho Legislative District 29 House Seat B General Election, 2020
Party	Candidate	Votes	%
Democratic	James D. Ruchti	14,679	100.0
Total votes		14,679	100.0
Democratic hold			

=== District 30 ===
Seat A

Idaho Legislative District 30 House Seat A Republican Primary Election, 2020
Party	Candidate	Votes	%
Idaho Republican Party	Gary L. Marshall (incumbent)	6,227	100.0
Total votes		6,227	100.0

Idaho Legislative District 30 House Seat A General Election, 2020
Party	Candidate	Votes	%
Idaho Republican Party	Gary L. Marshall (incumbent)	18,365	100.0
Total votes		18,365	100.0
Idaho Republican Party hold			

Seat B

Idaho Legislative District 30 House Seat B Republican Primary Election, 2020
Party	Candidate	Votes	%
Idaho Republican Party	Wendy Horman (incumbent)	6,155	100.0
Total votes		6,155	100.0

Idaho Legislative District 30 House Seat B General Election, 2020
Party	Candidate	Votes	%
Idaho Republican Party	Wendy Horman (incumbent)	17,955	100.0
Total votes		17,955	100.0
Idaho Republican Party hold			

=== District 31 ===
Seat A

Idaho Legislative District 31 House Seat A Republican Primary Election, 2020
Party	Candidate	Votes	%
Idaho Republican Party	David M. Cannon	4,705	74.1
Idaho Republican Party	Chad H. Cole	1,647	25.9
Total votes		6,352	100.0

Idaho Legislative District 31 House Seat A General Election, 2020
Party	Candidate	Votes	%
Idaho Republican Party	David M. Cannon	16,968	100.0
Total votes		16,968	100.0
Idaho Republican Party hold			

Seat B

Idaho Legislative District 31 House Seat B Republican Primary Election, 2020
Party	Candidate	Votes	%
Idaho Republican Party	Julianne Young (incumbent)	3,491	52.1
Idaho Republican Party	Donavan Harrington	3,205	47.9
Total votes		6,696	100.0

Idaho Legislative District 31 House Seat B Democratic Primary Election, 2020
Party	Candidate	Votes	%
Democratic	Travis Oler	793	100.0
Total votes		793	100.0

Idaho Legislative District 31 House Seat B General Election, 2020
Party	Candidate	Votes	%
Idaho Republican Party	Julianne Young (incumbent)	12,390	63.8
Democratic	Travis Oler	7,040	36.2
Total votes		19,430	100.0
Idaho Republican Party hold			

=== District 32 ===
Seat A

Idaho Legislative District 32 House Seat A Republican Primary Election, 2020
Party	Candidate	Votes	%
Idaho Republican Party	Marc Gibbs (incumbent)	8,671	100.0
Total votes		8,671	100.0

Idaho Legislative District 32 House Seat A General Election, 2020
Party	Candidate	Votes	%
Idaho Republican Party	Marc Gibbs (incumbent)	20,171	100.0
Total votes		20,171	100.0
Idaho Republican Party hold			

Seat B

Idaho Legislative District 32 House Seat B Republican Primary Election, 2020
Party	Candidate	Votes	%
Idaho Republican Party	Chad Christensen (incumbent)	5,761	59.6
Idaho Republican Party	Dave Radford	3,911	40.4
Total votes		9,672	100.0

Idaho Legislative District 32 House Seat B Democratic Primary Election, 2020
Party	Candidate	Votes	%
Democratic	Bill Leake	1,287	100.0
Total votes		1,287	100.0

Idaho Legislative District 32 House Seat B General Election, 2020
Party	Candidate	Votes	%
Idaho Republican Party	Chad Christensen (incumbent)	18,120	75.1
Democratic	Bill Leake	6,008	24.9
Total votes		24,128	100.0
Idaho Republican Party hold			

=== District 33 ===
Seat A

Idaho Legislative District 33 House Seat A Republican Primary Election, 2020
Party	Candidate	Votes	%
Idaho Republican Party	Barbara Ehardt (incumbent)	3,716	100.0
Total votes		3,716	100.0

Idaho Legislative District 33 House Seat A Democratic Primary Election, 2020
Party	Candidate	Votes	%
Democratic	Miranda Marquit	1,355	100.0
Total votes		1,355	100.0

Idaho Legislative District 33 House Seat A General Election, 2020
Party	Candidate	Votes	%
Idaho Republican Party	Barbara Ehardt (incumbent)	11,308	60.3
Democratic	Miranda Marquit	7,456	39.7
Total votes		18,764	100.0
Idaho Republican Party hold			

Seat B

Idaho Legislative District 33 House Seat B Republican Primary Election, 2020
Party	Candidate	Votes	%
Idaho Republican Party	Marco Erickson	2,509	51.4
Idaho Republican Party	Bryan Zollinger (incumbent)	2,375	48.6
Total votes		4,884	100.0

Idaho Legislative District 33 House Seat B Democratic Primary Election, 2020
Party	Candidate	Votes	%
Democratic	David Roth	1,286	100.0
Total votes		1,286	100.0

Idaho Legislative District 33 House Seat B General Election, 2020
Party	Candidate	Votes	%
Idaho Republican Party	Marco Erickson	11,922	65.1
Democratic	David Roth	6,400	34.9
Total votes		18,322	100.0
Idaho Republican Party hold			

=== District 34 ===
Seat A

Idaho Legislative District 34 House Seat A Republican Primary Election, 2020
Party	Candidate	Votes	%
Idaho Republican Party	Jon O. Weber	3,392	51.9
Idaho Republican Party	Shane S. Ruebush	3,140	48.1
Total votes		6,532	100.0

Idaho Legislative District 34 House Seat A General Election, 2020
Party	Candidate	Votes	%
Idaho Republican Party	Jon O. Weber	18,112	100.0
Total votes		18,112	100.0
Idaho Republican Party hold			

Seat B

Idaho Legislative District 34 House Seat B Republican Primary Election, 2020
Party	Candidate	Votes	%
Idaho Republican Party	Ron Nate	3,477	52.2
Idaho Republican Party	Britt Raybould (incumbent)	3,183	47.8
Total votes		6,660	100.0

Idaho Legislative District 34 House Seat B General Election, 2020
Party	Candidate	Votes	%
Idaho Republican Party	Ron Nate	17,698	100.0
Total votes		17,698	100.0
Idaho Republican Party hold			

=== District 35 ===
Seat A

Idaho Legislative District 35 House Seat A Republican Primary Election, 2020
Party	Candidate	Votes	%
Idaho Republican Party	Karey Hanks	4,870	50.8
Idaho Republican Party	Jerald Raymond (incumbent)	4,722	49.2
Total votes		9,592	100.0

Idaho Legislative District 35 House Seat A General Election, 2020
Party	Candidate	Votes	%
Idaho Republican Party	Karey Hanks	19,701	100.0
Total votes		19,701	100.0
Idaho Republican Party hold			

Seat B

Idaho Legislative District 35 House Seat B Republican Primary Election, 2020
Party	Candidate	Votes	%
Idaho Republican Party	Rod Furniss (incumbent)	6,460	68.6
Idaho Republican Party	George A. Judd	2,951	31.4
Total votes		9,411	100.0

Idaho Legislative District 35 House Seat B General Election, 2020
Party	Candidate	Votes	%
Idaho Republican Party	Rod Furniss (incumbent)	20,054	100.0
Total votes		20,054	100.0
Idaho Republican Party hold			

== See also ==
- 2020 Idaho elections
  - 2020 Idaho Senate election
  - 2020 United States Senate election in Idaho
  - 2020 United States presidential election in Idaho
  - 2020 United States House of Representatives elections in Idaho
