= 2022 Idaho lieutenant gubernatorial election =

- November 8, 2022
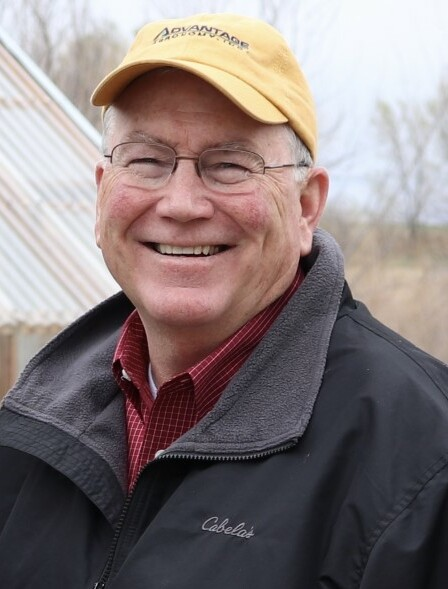

Nominee	Scott Bedke	Terri Pickens Manweiler	Pro-Life
Party	Republican	Democratic	Constitution
Popular vote	376,260	178,145	29,990
Percentage	64.38%	30.48%	5.13%
- Bedke: 50–60% 60–70% 70–80% 80–90% Manweiler: 50–60% 60–70%
Lieutenant Governor before election
Janice McGeachin
Republican
Elected Lieutenant Governor
Scott Bedke
Republican

The 2022 Idaho lieutenant gubernatorial election was held on November 8, 2022, to elect the next lieutenant governor of Idaho. It coincided with various other statewide races, including U.S. Senate, U.S. House, and governor. Idaho is one of 17 states that elect their lieutenant governor separately in both the primary and general elections.

Incumbent Republican Lieutenant Governor Janice McGeachin was first elected in 2018 with a plurality of 28.9% and 51,098 votes in a five-way primary then 59.7% and 356,507 votes in the general election. McGeachin had chosen not to run for reelection and instead unsuccessfully ran for governor in 2022.

The statewide primary was Tuesday, May 17, 2022.

== Republican primary ==
=== Candidates ===
==== Nominee ====
- Scott Bedke, speaker of the Idaho House of Representatives

==== Eliminated in primary ====
- Dan Gasiorowski, former Planning and Zoning Commission chair of Boise County
- Priscilla Giddings, state representative for Idaho's 7th legislative district

=== Endorsements ===
Scott Bedke

U.S. senators

- Jim Risch, U.S. senator from Idaho

U.S. governors (current and former)

- Dirk Kempthorne, former governor of Idaho, former U.S. senator from Idaho (1993–1999)
- Brad Little, governor of Idaho
- Butch Otter, former governor of Idaho

State senators (current and former)

- Jeff Agenbroad, state senator for Idaho's 13th legislative district
- Kelly Anthon, state senator for Idaho's 27th legislative district
- Steve Bair, state senator for Idaho's 31st legislative district
- Van Burtenshaw, state senator for Idaho's 35th legislative district
- Kevin Cook, state senator for Idaho's 30th legislative district
- Carl Crabtree, state senator for Idaho's 7th legislative district
- C. Scott Grow, state senator for Idaho's 14th legislative district
- Mark Harris, state senator for Idaho's 32nd legislative district
- Lee Heider, state senator for Idaho's 24th legislative district
- Todd Lakey, state senator for Idaho's 12th legislative district
- Abby Lee, state senator for Idaho's 9th legislative district
- Dave Lent, state senator for Idaho's 33rd legislative district
- Patti Anne Lodge, state senator for Idaho's 11th legislative district
- Fred Martin, state senator for Idaho's 15th legislative district
- Jim Patrick, state senator for Idaho's 25th legislative district
- Jim Rice, state senator for Idaho's 10th legislative district
- Doug Ricks, state senator for Idaho's 34th legislative district
- Peter Riggs, state senator for Idaho's 3rd legislative district
- Steven Thayn, state senator for Idaho's 8th legislative district
- Chuck Winder, state senator for Idaho's 20th legislative district, president pro tempore of the Idaho Senate
- Jim Woodward, state senator for Idaho's 1st legislative district

State representatives (current and former)

- Randy Armstrong, Seat A representative for Idaho's 28th legislative district
- Megan Blanksma, Seat B representative for Idaho's 23rd legislative district
- Matthew Bundy, Seat A representative for Idaho's 23rd legislative district
- David Cannon, Seat A representative for Idaho's 31st legislative district
- Gregory Chaney, Seat B representative for Idaho's 10th legislative district
- Lance Clow, Seat A representative for Idaho's 24th legislative district
- Marco Erickson, Seat B representative for Idaho's 33rd legislative district
- Rod Furniss, Seat B representative for Idaho's 35th legislative district
- Marc Gibbs, Seat A representative for Idaho's 32nd legislative district
- Steven Harris, Seat A representative for Idaho's 21st legislative district
- Linda Wright Hartgen, Seat B representative for Idaho's 24th legislative district
- Wendy Horman, Seat B representative for Idaho's 30th legislative district
- James Holtzclaw, Seat B Representative for Idaho's 20th legislative district
- Clark Kauffman, Seat B representative for Idaho's 25th legislative district
- Ryan Kerby, Seat A representative for Idaho's 9th legislative district
- Laurie Lickley, Seat A representative for Idaho's 25th legislative district
- Dustin Manwaring, Seat A representative for Idaho's 29th legislative district
- Gary Marshall, Seat A representative for Idaho's 30th legislative district
- Lori McCann, Seat A representative for Idaho's 6th legislative district
- Jason Monks, Seat B representative for Idaho's 22nd legislative district
- Mike Moyle, Seat A representative for Idaho's 14th legislative district, majority leader of the Idaho House of Representatives
- Joe Palmer, Seat A representative for Idaho's 20th legislative district
- Scott Syme, Seat A representative for Idaho's 11th legislative district
- Caroline Nilsson Troy, Seat B representative for Idaho's 5th legislative district
- John Vander Woude, Seat A representative for Idaho's 22nd legislative district
- Jon Weber, Seat A representative for Idaho's 34th legislative district
- Fred Wood, Seat B representative for Idaho's 27th legislative district
- Julie Yamamoto, Seat A representative for Idaho's 10th legislative district
- Rick Youngblood, Seat B representative for Idaho's 12th legislative district

Newspapers

- Coeur d'Alene Press
- Idaho Statesman

Organizations

- NRA Political Victory Fund

=== Polling ===
Poll source	Date(s) administered	Sample size (Note: Key: A – all adults RV – registered voters LV – likely voters V – unclear)	Margin of error	Scott Bedke	Daniel Gasiorowski	Priscilla Giddings	Undecided
Zoldak Research (R)	April 9–12, 2022	549 (LV)	± 4.0%	32%	4%	25%	39%
Zoldak Research (R)	December 20–21, 2021	575 (LV)	± 4.1%	36%	–	14%	50%

=== Results ===
Results by county Bedke: 40–50%; 50–60%; 60–70%; 70–80%; Giddings: 40–50%; 50–60%; 60–70%

2022 Idaho lieutenant gubernatorial Republican primary
Party	Candidate	Votes	%
Republican	Scott Bedke	139,561	51.7%
Republican	Priscilla Giddings	114,868	42.5%
Republican	Daniel Gasiorowski	15,672	5.8%
Total votes		270,101	100%

== Democratic primary ==
=== Candidates ===
==== Nominee ====
- Terri Pickens Manweiler, attorney

=== Endorsements ===
Terri Pickens Manweiler

Organizations

- Everytown for Gun Safety Action Fund

=== Results ===
Democratic primary results
Party	Candidate	Votes	%
Democratic	Terri Pickens Manweiler	32,312	100.0
Total votes		32,312	100.0

== Constitution primary ==
=== Candidates ===
==== Nominee ====
- Pro-Life, organic strawberry farmer and Idaho perennial candidate

=== Results ===
Constitution primary results
Party	Candidate	Votes	%
Constitution	Pro-Life	376	100.0
Total votes		376	100.0

== General election ==
=== Debate ===
2022 Idaho lieutenant gubernatorial election debate
No.	Date	Host	Moderator	Link	Republican	Democratic
Key: P Participant A Absent N Not invited I Invited W Withdrawn						
Key: P Participant A Absent N Not invited I Invited W Withdrawn					Scott Bedke	Terri Pickens Manweiler
1	October 28, 2022	IdahoPTV	Melissa Davlin	PBS	P	P

=== Results ===
Idaho lieutenant gubernatorial election, 2022
Party	Candidate	Votes	%
Republican	Scott Bedke	376,269	64.38%
Democratic	Terri Pickens Manweiler	178,147	30.48%
Constitution	Pro-Life	29,989	5.13%
Total votes		584,405	100%
Republican hold			

==== By county ====
County	Scott Bedke Republican		Terri Pickens Manweiler Democratic		Pro-Life Other parties	
County	#	%	#	%	#	%
Ada	94,758	51.58%	80,198	43.65%	8,765	4.77%
Adams	1,474	74.00%	405	20.33%	113	5.67%
Bannock	15,157	59.89%	9,471	37.42%	681	2.69%
Bear Lake	1,928	86.11%	211	9.42%	100	4.47%
Benewah	2,621	77.50%	541	16.00%	220	6.51%
Bingham	9,840	80.80%	1,886	15.49%	452	3.71%
Blaine	3,055	31.62%	6,398	66.22%	209	2.16%
Boise	2,288	67.43%	778	22.93%	327	9.64%
Bonner	13,427	66.27%	5,539	27.34%	1,295	6.39%
Bonneville	25,060	71.98%	8,506	24.43%	1,248	3.58%
Boundary	3,922	78.55%	787	15.76%	284	5.69%
Butte	806	81.83%	133	13.50%	46	4.67%
Camas	386	74.81%	111	21.51%	19	3.68%
Canyon	38,940	67.42%	13,754	23.81%	5,062	8.76%
Caribou	1,767	84.71%	230	11.03%	89	4.27%
Cassia	4,860	84.35%	599	10.40%	303	5.26%
Clark	164	81.19%	23	11.39%	15	7.43%
Clearwater	2,374	77.35%	566	18.44%	129	4.20%
Custer	1,455	73.52%	402	20.31%	122	6.16%
Elmore	4,650	70.97%	1,469	22.42%	433	6.61%
Franklin	3,701	87.37%	333	7.86%	202	4.77%
Fremont	3,516	83.28%	531	12.58%	175	4.14%
Gem	5,512	73.57%	1,215	16.22%	765	10.21%
Gooding	3,123	77.98%	667	16.65%	215	5.37%
Idaho	5,600	77.07%	1,041	14.33%	625	8.60%
Jefferson	7,735	85.83%	903	10.02%	374	4.15%
Jerome	3,720	77.16%	850	17.63%	251	5.21%
Kootenai	44,027	72.90%	13,617	22.55%	2,750	4.55%
Latah	7,466	50.21%	7,022	47.23%	381	2.56%
Lemhi	2,735	75.68%	735	20.34%	144	3.98%
Lewis	1,106	81.68%	198	14.62%	50	3.69%
Lincoln	1,005	76.19%	256	19.41%	58	4.40%
Madison	6,853	83.48%	1,023	12.46%	333	4.06%
Minidoka	3,837	81.93%	607	12.96%	239	5.10%
Nez Perce	9,158	68.57%	3,813	28.55%	384	2.88%
Oneida	1,362	85.71%	118	7.43%	109	6.86%
Owyhee	2,434	75.01%	468	14.42%	343	10.57%
Payette	5,758	76.25%	1,179	15.61%	614	8.13%
Power	1,491	75.76%	423	21.49%	54	2.74%
Shoshone	2,835	70.35%	1,059	26.28%	136	3.37%
Teton	2,113	45.42%	2,443	52.52%	96	2.06%
Twin Falls	16,336	72.32%	4,911	21.74%	1,340	5.93%
Valley	2,926	56.27%	2,143	41.21%	131	2.52%
Washington	2,988	76.99%	585	15.07%	308	7.94%
Totals	376,269	64.38%	178,147	30.48%	29,989	5.13%

Counties that flipped from Democratic to Republican

- Latah (largest municipality: Moscow)
- Ada (largest municipality: Boise)

==== By congressional district ====
Bedke won both congressional districts.

District	Bedke	Pickens Manweiler	Representative
1st	68%	26%	Russ Fulcher
2nd	60%	36%	Mike Simpson

== See also ==
- 2022 Idaho gubernatorial election
- Elections in Idaho
