= Libertarian Party of Idaho =

State affiliate of the Libertarian Party

- Chairperson: Jayson Sorensen
- Founded: 1975
- Headquarters: 9169 W State St #1743; Garden City, ID 83714
- Ideology: Libertarianism
- National affiliation: Libertarian Party
- Colors: Gold
- Idaho Senate: 0 / 35
- Idaho House of Representatives: 0 / 70
- U.S. Senate (Idaho): 0 / 2
- U.S. House of Representatives (Idaho): 0 / 2
- Other elected officials: 0 (June 2024)

Website
- lpid.org

The Libertarian Party of Idaho, also known as the LPID, is the affiliate of the Libertarian Party in the U.S. state of Idaho. The current chair is Jayson Sorensen.

Although it currently has no representation in the Idaho Legislature, it is one of four major political parties in Idaho which have ballot access (Using the Ballot access definition of Minor vs Major party). Ballot access has long been considered a core goal for Libertarian Party state-level affiliates.

The party promotes securing personal and economic liberties as its top priorities.

== History ==
The national Libertarian Party was founded in December 1971 in Colorado Springs, Colorado, and held its first national convention in 1972. However, the Libertarian Party of Idaho was not established until 1975 by D. Allen Dalton when it first announced his candidacy in the next elections.

Since its inception, the Libertarian Party of Idaho has held various elected positions mostly on local boards and city council seats. Generally, the Libertarian Party of Idaho runs about twelve candidates in each election cycle.

=== Party milestones ===
- In November, 1997, Ron Wittig became the first registered Libertarian to hold public office in the state of Idaho.
- In November, 2016, US presidential candidate Gary Johnson achieved 4.1% (28,331 votes) of the popular vote, representing the highest percentage achieved for a Libertarian presidential candidate in the state of Idaho.
- In October, 2020, the Libertarian Party of Idaho represented over 1% of registered voters in the state for the first time in party history.

== Former officials ==
- Ron Wittig New Meadows City Council (1997-2001)
- Rob Oates Caldwell City Council (2003-2007)

== Platform ==
The Libertarian Party of Idaho follows the platform of the Libertarian National Committee. This platform is based on the party's Statement of Principles, originally adopted at a convention of the national Libertarian Party in 1974.

Economic Policy

LPID wishes to reduce market regulations across the board, particularly in the healthcare industry. It also wants to reduce taxation to businesses and individuals as part of an overall goal to reduce the power of the government.

Social Policy

The Party seeks to engage in reform to the American justice system, including an end to the war on drugs. It also seeks to increase protections for gun ownership and the purchasing of firearms.

== Chairs of LPID ==
- Jayson Sorensen (2022-Present)
- Robert Imhoff-Dousharm (2022)
- Jennifer Imhoff-Dousharm (2020–2022)
- Rob Oates (2006-2020)
- Ted Dunlap (2004)
- Ryan Davidson (2001–2002)
- D. Allen Dalton (1975–1976)

== Notable electoral performances ==
Listed below are notable electoral performances by Idaho Libertarian Party nominees since 1998, as defined by winning at least 5.0% of the vote in a general election. Winners are shown in bold.

=== 2022 ===
Idaho Libertarian Party 2022 notable electoral performances
Election	District	Nominee	# Votes	% Votes	Place
Idaho State Senate	14th district	Robert Imhoff	2,326	10.3 / 100	2nd

=== 2020 ===
Idaho Libertarian Party 2020 notable electoral performances
Election	District	Nominee	# Votes	% Votes	Place
Idaho State Senate	28th district	Dan Karlan	4,916	22.4 / 100	2nd
Idaho House of Representatives	2 Seat B	Jennifer Luoma	4,803	16.5 / 100	2nd
Idaho House of Representatives	21 Seat B	Jess S. Smith	4,460	22.3 / 100	2nd
Idaho House of Representatives	23 Seat B	Lisa Adams	8,178	28.5 / 100	2nd
Kootenai County Sheriff		Justin Nagel	8,070	9.6 / 100	3rd

=== 2018 ===
Idaho Libertarian Party 2018 notable electoral performances
Election	District	Nominee	# Votes	% Votes	Place
Idaho State Senate	21st district	Joe Evans	1,187	5.6 / 100	3rd

=== 2016 ===
Idaho Libertarian Party 2016 notable electoral performances
Election	District	Nominee	# Votes	% Votes	Place
Idaho State Senate	29th district	Sierra "Idaho Lorax" Carta	1,159	7.0 / 100	3rd
Idaho House of Representatives	11 Seat B	John Charles Smith	1,656	8.6 / 100	3rd
Idaho House of Representatives	23 Seat B	Christopher Jenkins	889	6.3 / 100	3rd
Bannock County Board of Commissioners	3rd District	Kevin Lee Perry	2,732	8.3 / 100	3rd

=== 2014 ===
Idaho Libertarian Party 2014 notable electoral performances
Election	District	Nominee	# Votes	% Votes	Place
Idaho House of Representatives	17 Seat A	Paul D. Hautzinger	2,431	23.4 / 100	2nd
Idaho House of Representatives	21 Seat B	Joe Hautzinger	2,828	22.1 / 100	2nd
Idaho House of Representatives	29 Seat A	Matthew Larsen	643	5.8 / 100	3rd

=== 2012 ===
Idaho Libertarian Party 2012 notable electoral performances
Election	District	Nominee	# Votes	% Votes	Place
Idaho House of Representatives	16 Seat A	Jeffrey Laing	1,427	7.6 / 100	3rd
Idaho House of Representatives	17 Seat B	Mikel Hautzinger	976	6.0 / 100	3rd
Idaho House of Representatives	33 Seat A	Christopher Joseph Brunt	1,160	6.8 / 100	3rd
Ada County Sheriff		Ted Dunlap	41,014	25.7 / 100	2nd
Bannock County Board of Commissioners	3rd District	John Bischoff	2,726	8.0 / 100	3rd

=== 2010 ===
Idaho Libertarian Party 2010 notable electoral performances
Election	District	Nominee	# Votes	% Votes	Place
Idaho House of Representatives	11 Seat B	John Charles Smith	2,116	15.8 / 100	2nd
Idaho House of Representatives	15 Seat B	Marvin Gardner	2,215	21.3 / 100	2nd
Idaho House of Representatives	17 Seat A	Mikel Hautzinger	499	5.4 / 100	3rd

=== 2008 ===
Idaho Libertarian Party 2008 notable electoral performances
Election	District	Nominee	# Votes	% Votes	Place
Idaho House of Representatives	17 Seat A	Mikel Hautzinger	3,298	19.6 / 100	2nd
Idaho House of Representatives	20 Seat A	Rex W. Kerr	4,337	22.7 / 100	2nd

=== 2006 ===
Idaho Libertarian Party 2006 notable electoral performances
Election	District	Nominee	# Votes	% Votes	Place
Kootenai County Assessor		John F. Gessner	7,180	20.8 / 100	2nd

=== 2004 ===
Idaho Libertarian Party 2004 notable electoral performances
Election	District	Nominee	# Votes	% Votes	Place
Idaho House of Representatives	15 Seat A	Randal A. Williamson	3,034	19.6 / 100	2nd
Idaho House of Representatives	15 Seat B	Marvin Gardner	3,493	22.9 / 100	2nd
Idaho House of Representatives	20 Seat A	David H. Slack	2,740	15.3 / 100	2nd
Idaho House of Representatives	34 Seat A	Timothy A. Raty	1,419	8.9 / 100	2nd

=== 2002 ===
Idaho Libertarian Party 2002 notable electoral performances
Election	District	Nominee	# Votes	% Votes	Place
Idaho Secretary of State		Ronald E. Perry	86,437	22.5 / 100	2nd
Idaho State Senate	4th district	Dan Gookin	615	6.0 / 100	3rd
Idaho State Senate	14th district	Lee Carey	3,044	21.2 / 100	2nd
Idaho House of Representatives	2 Seat A	Andy Jolliff	913	8.5 / 100	3rd
Idaho House of Representatives	9 Seat B	Caryl A. Whitlatch	2,014	20.2 / 100	2nd
Idaho House of Representatives	12 Seat A	Jay Riddle	1,826	23.3 / 100	2nd
Idaho House of Representatives	16 Seat A	John Bischoff	2,281	20.6 / 100	2nd
Idaho House of Representatives	18 Seat A	Luke McManamon	883	7.1 / 100	3rd
Idaho House of Representatives	19 Seat A	David Zimlich	2,058	14.4 / 100	2nd
Idaho House of Representatives	19 Seat B	Howard Olivier	2,345	16.6 / 100	2nd
Idaho House of Representatives	20 Seat A	Wendy Lieberman	741	6.2 / 100	3rd
Idaho House of Representatives	20 Seat B	David Lieberman	621	5.2 / 100	3rd
Ada County Clerk of the District Court		Ginny Eggleston	21,215	22.1 / 100	2nd
Ada County Treasurer		Dustin Kier	20,826	22.0 / 100	2nd
Ada County Assessor		Ryan Davidson	22,872	24.0 / 100	2nd
Boise County Assessor		Clifton T. George	710	29.3 / 100	2nd
Kootenai County Board of Commissioners	1st District	Ginny Eggleston	1,937	6.2 / 100	3rd
Kootenai County Board of Commissioners	2nd District	Christian Kirsch	2,682	8.8 / 100	3rd
Kootenai County Treasurer		Moe Thibert	5,405	18.2 / 100	2nd
Kootenai County Assessor		Victoria Keyes	7,406	25.0 / 100	2nd
Kootenai County Coroner		Kenneth P. Davidson	6,303	21.3 / 100	2nd

=== 2000 ===
Idaho Libertarian Party 2000 notable electoral performances
Election	District	Nominee	# Votes	% Votes	Place
Idaho State Senate	15th district	Bill E. Anderson	946	6.0 / 100	3rd
Idaho State Senate	18th district	Daniel L.J. Adams	3,165	19.7 / 100	2nd
Idaho House of Representatives	19 Seat A	Brooke L. Wilmoth	872	6.0 / 100	3rd
Idaho House of Representatives	22 Seat A	Jonathan A. Stump	1,554	15.4 / 100	2nd
Ada County Board of Commissioners	1st District	Robert John Blakely	6,582	5.6 / 100	2nd
Gem County Prosecuting Attorney		**Richard Linville**	4,280	100 / 100	**1st**

=== 1998 ===
Idaho Libertarian Party 1998 notable electoral performances
Election	District	Nominee	# Votes	% Votes	Place
Idaho State Senate	18th district	Daniel L.J. Adams	2,758	24.0 / 100	2ndd
Idaho House of Representatives	8 Seat B	Ronald G. Wittig	2,175	18.3 / 100	2nd
Idaho House of Representatives	12 Seat B	David Eppes	2,191	19.4 / 100	2nd
Ada County Clerk of the District Court		Jamie M. Weems	15,404	18.7 / 100	2nd
Payette County Board of Commissioners	3rd district	Sylvia Zitek	1,154	23.4 / 100	1st

== See also ==
- Political party strength in Idaho
