= Robert E. Schaefer =

American architect and politician (1936–2019)

Member of the Idaho House of Representatives
- In office December 1, 1984 – November 30, 2012
- Preceded by: Carroll W. Dean
- Succeeded by: Robert Anderst
- Constituency: 11th district Seat A (1984-2002); 12th district Seat A (2002-2012)

Personal details
- Born: July 21, 1936 Nampa, Idaho
- Died: October 29, 2019 (aged 83) Nampa, Idaho
- Party: Republican
- Spouse: Betty Schaefer
- Children: 2
- Education: University of Idaho
- Occupation: Architect
- Other names: Bob Schaefer, Robert Ernest Schaefer
- Military career
- Allegiance: United States
- Branch: United States Air Force
- Service years: 1957-1961

Robert E. Schaefer, Sr. is a former American architect and politician from Idaho. Schaefer is a former Republican member of Idaho House of Representatives.

== Early life ==
On July 21, 1936, Schaefer was born as Robert Ernest Schaefer in Nampa, Idaho. Schaefer's father was Bill Schaefer and his mother was Mildred Schaefer. In 1954, Schaefer graduated from Nampa High School.

== Education ==
In 1967, Schaefer earned a Bachelor of Arts degree in Architecture from University of Idaho.

== Career ==
In 1957, Schaefer served in the United States Air Force, until 1961.

In 1978, Schaefer started an architect firm.

In 1979, Schaefer served as a member on the Nampa School Board, until 1980.

On November 6, 1984, Schaefer first won election against Democrat Frank McKeever and became a Republican member of Idaho House of Representatives, representing District 11.

On November 5, 1996, Schaefer was reelected unopposed for District 11, seat A. On November 3, 1998, as an incumbent, Schaefer won the election and continued serving District 11, seat A. Schaefer defeated Maureen O'Donnell with 68.6% of the votes. On November 7, 2000, as an incumbent, Schaefer won the election unopposed and continued serving District 11, seat A.votes.

On November 5, 2002, Schaefer won the election and became a Republican member of Idaho House of Representatives for District 12, seat A. Schaefer defeated Jay Riddle with 76.7% of the votes. On November 2, 2004, as an incumbent, Schaefer won the election unopposed and continued serving District 12, seat A. On November 7, 2006, November 4, 2008, and November 2, 2010, as an incumbent Schaefer won the elections and continued serving District 12, seat A.

== Personal life ==
On September 12, 1965, Schaefer married Betty Seitz. They have two children.

On October 29, 2019, Schaefer died from prostate cancer in Nampa, Idaho.
