= Maynard Miller =

American politician from Idaho

Maynard Malcolm Miller

Member of the Idaho House of Representatives
- In office 1992–1998
- Succeeded by: Shirley Ringo
- Constituency: 5th district Seat B (1992–1998)

Personal details
- Born: 1921
- Died: January 26, 2014 (aged 92–93) Moscow, Idaho
- Party: Republican
- Education: Harvard College; Columbia University; University of Cambridge
- Occupation: Politician, professor

Maynard Malcolm Miller (1921 – January 26, 2014) was a former American politician from Idaho. Miller was a Republican member of Idaho House of Representatives from 1992 to 1998 for Idaho's 5th legislative district.

In 1963 he took part in the American Mount Everest Expedition as a scientist and climber. Later he was a professor at the University of Idaho.
