= Kathy Skippen =

American politician and farmer from Idaho

Member of the Idaho House of Representatives from the District 11 Seat A district
- In office December 1, 2002 – November 30, 2006
- Preceded by: Robert E. Schaefer (redistricting)
- Succeeded by: Steven Thayn

Personal details
- Party: Republican
- Occupation: Politician, farmer

Kathy Skippen is an American politician and farmer from Idaho. Skippen was a Republican member of Idaho House of Representatives.

== Career ==
Skippen and her family are in the agriculture industry in Idaho. Skippen is a farmer.

Skippen was a county commissioner for Gem County, Idaho.

== Elections ==
=== 2006 ===
Skippen was defeated in the Republican primary by Steven Thayn taking only 47.7% of the vote.

=== 2004 ===
Skippen defeated Terry A. Jones and Dale R. Salyers in the Republican primary taking 50.7% of the vote. Skippen defeated Constitution party nominee Marvin Richardson with 77.9% of the vote in the general election.

=== 2002 ===
Skippen defeated Jonna Weber, Terry A. Jones, and Louis E. "Ed" Falkenstien in the Republican primary taking 28.2% of the vote. Skippen was unopposed in the general election.

== Personal life ==
Skippen lives in Emmett, Idaho.
