= Jack Nelsen =

American politician

Member of the Idaho House of Representatives from the 26B district
- Incumbent
- Assumed office December 1, 2022
- Preceded by: Sally Toone

Personal details
- Party: Republican
- Spouse: Emily Mills (m. 1980)
- Children: 3
- Education: College of Southern Idaho (AA); University of Redlands (BA); Boise State University (MEd)
- Occupation: Music teacher, dairy farmer
- Known for: Comments comparing milking cows to reproductive healthcare

Jack Sonnich Nelsen is an American politician, retired music teacher, and dairy farmer, representing District 26B in the Idaho House of Representatives since 2022. A member of the Republican Party, Nelsen generated controversy in his first-ever House Agricultural Affairs Committee meeting for saying he had "definite opinions" about reproduction and women's health because of his experience with cows, for which he subsequently apologized and clarified that he is pro-choice.
