= Donna Pence =

American politician

Member of the Idaho House of Representatives
- In office December 1, 2012 – December 1, 2016
- Preceded by: Maxine Bell
- Succeeded by: Sally Toone
- Constituency: District 26, seat B
- In office December 1, 2004 – December 1, 2012
- Preceded by: Tim Ridinger
- Succeeded by: Clark Kauffman
- Constituency: District 25, seat B

Personal details
- Born: August 23, 1942 (age 84) Joliet, Illinois
- Party: Democratic
- Education: University of Idaho; Idaho State University
- Profession: Teacher

Donna Lee Pence (born August 23, 1942, in Joliet, Illinois) was a Democratic Idaho State Representative representing District 25 in the B seat from 2004 to 2016. Pence was also the House Assistant Minority Leader.

== Education ==
Pence graduated from Richfield High School and earned her bachelor's degree in education from the University of Idaho and her master's degree in health and physical education from Idaho State University.

== Elections ==
Donna Pence chose not to seek reelection in 2016.

=== 2014 ===
Pence was unopposed for the Democratic primary.

Pence defeated Don Hudson in the general election with 59.4% of the vote.

=== 2012 ===
Redistricted to District 26, Pence was unopposed for the Democratic primary.

Pence defeated Republican nominee Lee Barron in the general election with 58.9% of the vote.

Pence succeeded Republican Representative Maxine Bell, who was re-districted to District 25.

=== 2010 ===
Unopposed for the Democratic primary.

Pence defeated Alex Sutter in the general election with 54.9% of the vote .

=== 2008 ===
Unopposed for both the Democratic primary and the general election.

=== 2006 ===
Unopposed for both the Democratic primary and the general election.

=== 2004 ===
Pence was unopposed in Democratic primary; Ridinger was also unopposed, setting up a rematch.

Pence defeated Ridinger in the general election with 8,790 votes (51.0%).

=== 2002 ===
When incumbent Republican Representative and Idaho Speaker of the House Bruce Newcomb was re-districted to District 27, Pence was unopposed for the District 25 B seat in the May 28, 2002 Democratic primary.

Pence lost the general election to Republican Representative Tim Ridinger, who had been re-districted from 21B.
