= Gary F. Young =

American politician from Idaho

Member of the Idaho House of Representatives
- In office December 1, 2000 – December 1, 2002
- Preceded by: Shirley Ringo
- Succeeded by: Charles Eberle (redistricting)
- Constituency: 5th district Seat B (2000–2002)

Personal details
- Born: February 23, 1945 (age 81) Ottumwa, Iowa
- Party: Republican
- Spouse: Lynne Young
- Children: 2
- Education: Colorado State University
- Occupation: Politician

Gary F. Young is a former American politician from Idaho. Young was a Republican member of Idaho House of Representatives.

== Early life ==
On February 23, 1945, Young was born in Ottumwa, Iowa.

== Education ==
Young attended Mesa Junior College until 1965. Young attend Adams State College. In 1968, Young earned a Bachelor of Science degree from Colorado State University.

== Career ==
In 1968, in military, Young was a member of the United States Army Reserve, until 1977.

In 1969, Young was a Sales Representative for Shell Chemical Company, until 1977.

In 1996, Young served as the Vice Chair of Latah County Republicans Central Committee, until 1998. In June 1998, Young served as the Chair of Latah County Republicans Central Committee, until 2000.

In 1997, Young became a Senior Marketing Representative for Novartis Crop Protection, until 1999.

On November 7, 2000, Young won the election and became a Republican member of Idaho House of Representatives for District 5, seat B. Young defeated Shirley G. Ringo with 51.0% of the votes.

On November 5, 2002, as an incumbent, Young sought a seat in District 6, seat B unsuccessfully. Young was defeated by Shirley G. Ringo with 53.2% of the votes.

== Personal life ==
Young's wife is Lynne Young. They have two children. Young and his family live in Moscow, Idaho.
