= Tammy Nichols =

American politician from Idaho

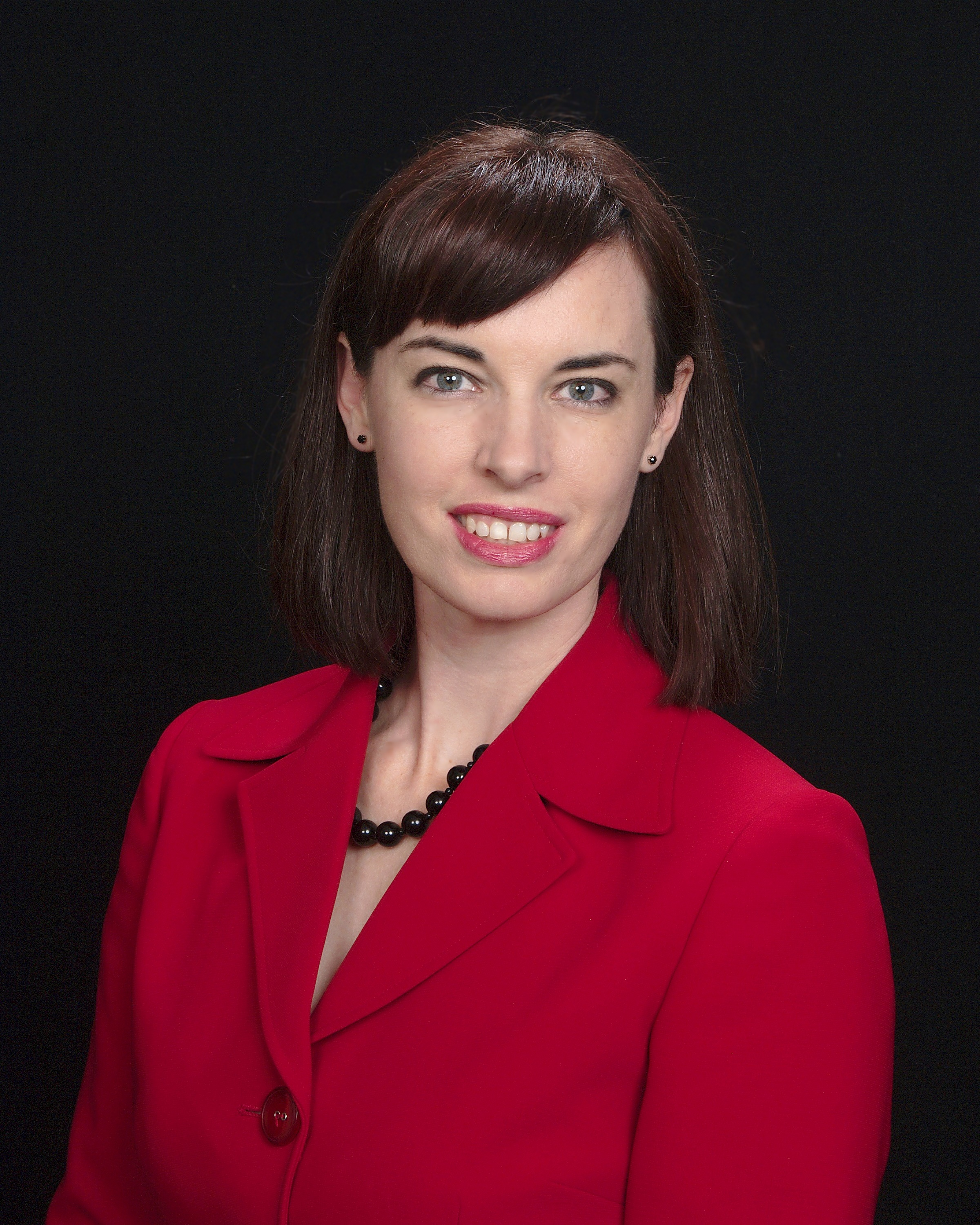

Member of the Idaho Senate from the 10th district
- Incumbent
- Assumed office December 1, 2022
- Preceded by: Jim Rice

Member of the Idaho House of Representatives from the 11th district
- In office December 1, 2018 – December 1, 2022
- Succeeded by: Chris Allgood

Personal details
- Born: February 1976 (age 50) Boise, Idaho, U.S.
- Party: Republican
- Spouse: Jeramie (div 2019)
- Children: 5
- Education: Brigham Young University–Idaho

Tammy Nichols (born February 1976) is an American politician and speaker serving as a member of the Idaho Senate for District 10. She is also a co-chair of the Idaho Freedom Caucus.

== Early life and education ==
Nichols was born in Boise, Idaho and graduated from Boise High School in 1994. In 2016, Nichols graduated in Applied Science from Brigham Young University–Idaho.

== Elections ==
- In 2018, Nichols defeated four candidates for the open Idaho House of Representatives District 11 Seat B; Kirk Adams, Scott R Brock, David L Lincoln, and Kathryn Ralstin with 38.9% of the vote. Nichols defeated Democratic nominee Brian A. Ertz with 77.6% of the vote.
- In 2020, Nichols defeated Democratic nominee Edward Savala with 79.8% of the vote to retain her seat.
- In 2022, Nichols ran for the state senate in District 10, defeating Democratic nominee Bob Solomon with 77.2% of the vote.

== Political activity ==
In January 2023, Nichols sponsored SB1038, the Education Choice Act, a school choice bill.

In February 2023, Nichols and Idaho Rep. Judy Boyle introduced HB 154, a bill that would make it a misdemeanor to provide or administer a vaccine developed using messenger RNA (mRNA) technology in any individual or mammal in the state. This would prohibit all mRNA-based COVID-19 vaccines, and pre-emptively ban mRNA vaccines being developed as treatments for other illnesses. Nichols also sponsored a bill that would require the inclusion of "vaccine materials" in food to be labelled.

== Personal life ==
Nichols has five children. Nichols and her family live in Middleton, Idaho. Nichols and her husband divorced in January 2019.
