= Robert Anderst =

American politician from Idaho

Member of the Idaho House of Representatives from the District 12, seat A district
- In office December 1, 2012 – November 30, 2020
- Preceded by: Robert E. Schaefer
- Succeeded by: Bruce Skaug

Personal details
- Born: Pocatello, Idaho, U.S.
- Party: Republican
- Spouse: Amy Anderst
- Children: 2
- Education: Idaho State University

Robert Anderst is a politician who served as a member of Idaho House of Representatives from 2012 to 2020. Anderst announced he would not run for re-election in 2020.

== Early life and education ==
Anderst was born in Pocatello, Idaho. In 1992, he earned an associates degree in business management and marketing from Idaho State University.

== Career ==
Anderst is a Lobbyist with Risch Pisca PLLC. He also is a commercial real estate broker and owner of the Anderst Company in Boise, Idaho https://www.linkedin.com/in/robert-anderst-0904771ab

On November 6, 2012, Anderst won the election and became a Republican member of Idaho House of Representatives for District 12, seat A. Anderst defeated Tracy S. Volpi with 67.1% of the votes. On November 4, 2014, as an incumbent, Anderst won the election and continued serving District 12, seat A. Anderst defeated Maria Gonzalez Mabbutt with 69.0% of the votes. On November 8, 2016, as an incumbent, Anderst won the election and continued serving District 12, seat A. Anderst defeated Maria Gonzalez Mabbutt with 68.5% of the votes. On November 6, 2018, as an incumbent, Anderst won the election and continued serving District 12, seat A. Anderst defeated Pat Day Hartwell with 64.0% of the votes.

== Election history ==
District 12 House Seat A - Part of Canyon County
Year	Candidate	Votes	Pct	Candidate	Votes	Pct	Candidate	Votes	Pct
2012 Primary	Robert Anderst	1,416	44.5%	Roger Hunt	1,066	33.5%	Steve Nible	699	22.0%
2012 General	Robert Anderst	9,693	67.1%	Tracy Volpi	4,759	32.9%			
2014 Primary	Robert Anderst (incumbent)	1,598	51.5%	Roger Hunt	1,507	48.5%			
2014 General	Robert Anderst (incumbent)	6,589	69.0%	Maria Gonzalez Mabbutt	2,967	31.0%			
2016 Primary	Robert Anderst (incumbent)	1,876	100%						
2016 General	Robert Anderst (incumbent)	10,972	68.5%	Maria Gonzalez Mabbutt	5,042	31.5%			

== Personal life ==
Anderst's wife is Amy Anderst. He has two adult children. Anderst and his family live in Nampa, Idaho.
