= Jim Addis =

American politician and businessman from Idaho

Member of the Idaho House of Representatives from the District 4, seat A district
- In office December 1, 2018 – December 1, 2022
- Preceded by: Luke Malek
- Succeeded by: Joe Alferi

Personal details
- Party: Republican
- Spouse: Terri Addis
- Children: 1
- Education: Washington State University
- Occupation: Politician, businessman

Jim Addis is an American politician and businessman from Idaho. Addis is a former Republican member of Idaho House of Representatives for District 4, seat A.

== Education ==
In 1984, Addis earned a bachelor's degree in business management/economics from Washington State University.

== Career ==
In 1998, Addis became a general manager of Tom Addis Auto Group, until 2016.

In 2017, Addis became the owner of Lake City Wholesale, LLC, a company in the auto industry.

On November 6, 2018, Addis won the election and became a Republican member of Idaho House of Representatives for District 4, seat A. Addis defeated Rebecca Schroeder with 56.7% of the votes.

== Personal life ==
Addis' wife is Terri Addis. They have one child. Addis and his family live in Coeur d'Alene, Idaho.
