= Ron Mendive =

American politician from Idaho

Member of the Idaho House of Representatives
- Incumbent
- Assumed office December 1, 2012
- Preceded by: Vito Barbieri (redistricting)
- Constituency: 3rd district Seat A (2012-2022); 5th district Seat A (2022-present)

Personal details
- Born: Elko, Nevada, U.S.
- Party: Republican
- Spouse: Sherlene
- Education: Kellogg High School; North Idaho College
- Profession: Land service/Excavating
- Website: ronmendive.com

Ron Mendive is an American politician, serving as an Idaho State Representative since 2012. A member of the Republican Party, Mendive represents District 5 in the A seat.

== Education ==
Born in Elko, Nevada, Mendive graduated from Kellogg High School, and attended North Idaho College.

== Idaho House of Representatives ==
=== Committee assignments ===
- Education Committee
- Environment, Energy, and Technology Committee
- Resources and Conservation Committee

Mendive previously served on the Commerce and Human Resources Committee from 2012 to 2014.

== Elections ==
District 3 House Seat A - Part of Kootenai County
Year	Candidate	Votes	Pct	Candidate	Votes	Pct
2012 Primary	Ron Mendive	1,667	50.1%	Jeff Tyler	1,658	49.9%
2012 General	Ron Mendive	11,855	67.9%	David Larsen	5,609	32.1%
2014 Primary	Ron Mendive (incumbent)	2,408	65.6%	Terry Werner	1,260	34.4%
2014 General	Ron Mendive (incumbent)	7,580	70.3%	Michelle Lippert	3,202	29.7%
2016 Primary	Ron Mendive (incumbent)	3,350	100%			
2016 General	Ron Mendive (incumbent)	17,115	100%			
