= Gary Collins (Idaho politician) =

American politician from Idaho

Member of the Idaho House of Representatives from the 13th district
- In office December 1, 2012 – December 1, 2020
- Preceded by: Christy Perry
- Succeeded by: Ben Adams

Member of the Idaho House of Representatives from the 12th district
- In office December 1, 2002 – December 1, 2012
- Preceded by: Bill Deal
- Succeeded by: Rick Youngblood

Member of the Idaho House of Representatives from the 11th district
- In office December 1, 2000 – December 1, 2002
- Preceded by: Bill Taylor
- Succeeded by: Gary W. Bauer

Personal details
- Born: September 19, 1942 (age 83) Boise, Idaho, U.S.
- Died: January 28, 2023
- Party: Republican
- Spouse: Ann
- Children: 6

Gary E. Collins (born September 19, 1942) is an American politician who served as a member of the Idaho House of Representatives from 2000 to 2020.

== Education ==
Collins graduated from Kuna High School.

== Elections ==
=== Idaho House of Representatives District 13 Seat B ===
==== 2018 ====
Collins defeated Lori Shewmaker in the Republican primary with 62.2% of the vote. Collins defeated Democratic nominee Chris Ho with 65.8% of the vote.

==== 2016 ====
Collins defeated Alan C. Jones again in the Republican primary this time with 70.9% of the vote. Collins was unopposed in the general election.

==== 2014 ====
Collins defeated Alan C. Jones in the Republican primary with 73.1% of the vote. Collins was unopposed in the general election.

==== 2012 ====
Redistricted to District 13, and with Representative Christy Perry re-districted to District 11, Collins was unopposed for the May 15, 2012, Republican primary, and unopposed for the general election on November 6, 2012.

=== Idaho House of Representatives District 12 Seat B ===
==== 2010 ====
Collins won the May 25, 2010, Republican primary with 2,807 votes (75.2%) against Greg Collett, and won the November 2, 2010, general election with 5,970 votes (72.2%) against Melissa Sue Robinson (D).

==== 2008 ====
Unopposed for the May 27, 2008, Republican primary, Collins won with 2,086 votes; Freeman had been unopposed for the Democratic primary, setting up a rematch. Collins won the November 4, 2006, general election with 8,352 votes (65.5%) against Freeman.

==== 2006 ====
Unopposed for the May 23, 2006, Republican primary, Collins won with 2,435 votes, and won the November 7, 2006, general election with 5,781 votes (68.39%) against Sunny Freeman (D).

==== 2004 ====
Unopposed for the May 25, 2004, Republican primary, Collins won with 2,425 votes, and won the November 2, 2004, general election with 8,614 votes (69.5%) against Ralph Smith (D).

==== 2002 ====
Redistricted to 12B, and with Republican Representative W.W. 'Bill' Deal re-districted to 13B, Collins was unopposed for the May 28, 2002, Republican primary, winning with 2,279 votes, and won the November 5, 2002, general election with 5,331 votes (65.1%) against Amanda Brown (D).

=== Idaho House of Representatives District 11 Seat B ===
==== 2000 ====
When Republican Representative W.O. Taylor left the District 11 B seat open, Collins won the May 23, 2000, Republican primary with 2,821 votes (54.3%) against Curtis McKenzie, and won the November 7, 2000, general election with 11,340 votes (74.1%) against Democratic nominee Benny Antunes (D).
