= Idaho's 26th legislative district =

American legislative district

Idaho's 26th legislative district is one of 35 districts of the Idaho Legislature. It is currently represented by Senator Michelle Stennett, Democrat of Ketchum, Representative Ned Burns, Democrat of Bellevue, and Representative Sally Toone, Democrat of Gooding.

== District profile ==
=== 2012–present ===
District 26 currently consists of all of Blaine, Camas, Gooding, and Lincoln Counties.

Legislature	Session	Senate	House Seat A	House Seat B
62nd (2012 - 2014)	1st	Michelle Stennett (D)	Steve Miller (R)	Donna Pence (D)
62nd (2012 - 2014)	2nd	Michelle Stennett (D)	Steve Miller (R)	Donna Pence (D)
63rd (2014 - 2016)	1st	Michelle Stennett (D)	Steve Miller (R)	Donna Pence (D)
63rd (2014 - 2016)	2nd	Michelle Stennett (D)	Steve Miller (R)	Donna Pence (D)
64th (2016 - 2018)	1st	Michelle Stennett (D)	Steve Miller (R)	Sally Toone (D)
64th (2016 - 2018)	2nd	Michelle Stennett (D)	Steve Miller (R)	Sally Toone (D)
65th (2018 - 2020)	1st	Michelle Stennett (D)	Marianna Davis (D)	Sally Toone (D)
65th (2018 - 2020)	2nd	Michelle Stennett (D)	Marianna Davis (D)	Sally Toone (D)
66th (2020 - 2022)	1st	Michelle Stennett (D)	Marianna Davis (D)	Sally Toone (D)
66th (2020 - 2022)	2nd	Michelle Stennett (D)	Ned Burns (D)	Sally Toone (D)

=== 2002–2012 ===
From 2002 to 2012, District 26 consisted of all of Minidoka and Jerome counties.

Legislature	Session	Senate	House Seat A	House Seat B
57th (2002 - 2004)	1st	Dean Cameron (R)	Bert Stevenson (R)	Maxine Bell (R)
57th (2002 - 2004)	2nd	Dean Cameron (R)	Bert Stevenson (R)	Maxine Bell (R)
58th (2004 - 2006)	1st	Dean Cameron (R)	Bert Stevenson (R)	Maxine Bell (R)
58th (2004 - 2006)	2nd	Dean Cameron (R)	Bert Stevenson (R)	Maxine Bell (R)
59th (2006 - 2008)	1st	Dean Cameron (R)	Bert Stevenson (R)	Maxine Bell (R)
59th (2006 - 2008)	2nd	Dean Cameron (R)	Bert Stevenson (R)	Maxine Bell (R)
60th (2008 - 2010)	1st	Dean Cameron (R)	Bert Stevenson (R)	Maxine Bell (R)
60th (2008 - 2010)	2nd	Dean Cameron (R)	Bert Stevenson (R)	Maxine Bell (R)
61st (2010 - 2012)	1st	Dean Cameron (R)	Bert Stevenson (R)	Maxine Bell (R)
61st (2010 - 2012)	2nd	Dean Cameron (R)	Bert Stevenson (R)	Maxine Bell (R)

=== 1992–2002 ===
From 1992 to 2002, District 26 consisted of all of Clark, Custer, Jefferson, and Lemhi counties.

Legislature	Session	Senate	House Seat A	House Seat B
51st (1992 - 1994)	1st	Rex Furness (R)	JoAn Wood (R)	Lenore Barrett (R)
51st (1992 - 1994)	2nd	Rex Furness (R)	JoAn Wood (R)	Lenore Barrett (R)
52nd (1994 - 1996)	1st	Rex Furness (R)	JoAn Wood (R)	Lenore Barrett (R)
52nd (1994 - 1996)	2nd	Rex Furness (R)	JoAn Wood (R)	Lenore Barrett (R)
53rd (1996 - 1998)	1st	Don Burtenshaw (R)	JoAn Wood (R)	Lenore Barrett (R)
53rd (1996 - 1998)	2nd	Don Burtenshaw (R)	JoAn Wood (R)	Lenore Barrett (R)
54th (1998 - 2000)	1st	Don Burtenshaw (R)	JoAn Wood (R)	Lenore Barrett (R)
54th (1998 - 2000)	2nd	Don Burtenshaw (R)	JoAn Wood (R)	Lenore Barrett (R)
55th (2000 - 2002)	1st	Don Burtenshaw (R)	JoAn Wood (R)	Lenore Barrett (R)
55th (2000 - 2002)	2nd	Don Burtenshaw (R)	JoAn Wood (R)	Lenore Barrett (R)

== See also ==
- List of Idaho senators
- List of Idaho representatives
