= Idaho's 5th legislative district =

American legislative district

Idaho's 5th legislative district, highlighted in purple, as of 2022

Idaho's 5th legislative district is one of 35 districts of the Idaho Legislature. It currently comprises part of Kootenai County.

It is currently represented by Senator Carl Bjerke, Republican of Coeur d' Alene, as well as representatives Ron Mendive, Republican of Coeur d' Alene, and Tony Wisniewski, Republican of Post Falls.

== District profile ==
=== 1992–2002 ===
From 1992 to 2002, District 5 consisted of most of Latah County.

Legislature	Session	Senate	House Seat A	House Seat B
52nd (1992 - 1994)	1st	Gary Schroeder (R)	Doc Lucas (R)	Maynard Miller (R)
52nd (1992 - 1994)	2nd	Gary Schroeder (R)	Doc Lucas (R)	Maynard Miller (R)
53rd (1994 - 1996)	1st	Gary Schroeder (R)	Doc Lucas (R)	Maynard Miller (R)
53rd (1994 - 1996)	2nd	Gary Schroeder (R)	Doc Lucas (R)	Maynard Miller (R)
54th (1996 - 1998)	1st	Gary Schroeder (R)	Tom Trail (R)	Maynard Miller (R)
54th (1996 - 1998)	2nd	Gary Schroeder (R)	Tom Trail (R)	Maynard Miller (R)
55th (1998 - 2000)	1st	Gary Schroeder (R)	Tom Trail (R)	Shirley Ringo (D)
55th (1998 - 2000)	2nd	Gary Schroeder (R)	Tom Trail (R)	Shirley Ringo (D)
56th (2000 - 2002)	1st	Gary Schroeder (R)	Tom Trail (R)	Gary F. Young (R)
56th (2000 - 2002)	2nd	Gary Schroeder (R)	Tom Trail (R)	Gary F. Young (R)

=== 2002–2012 ===
From 2002 to 2012, District 5 consisted of a portion of Kootenai County.

Legislature	Session	Senate	House Seat A	House Seat B
57th (2002 - 2004)	1st	Dick Compton (R)	Hilde Kellogg (R)	Charles Eberle (R)
57th (2002 - 2004)	2nd	Dick Compton (R)	Hilde Kellogg (R)	Charles Eberle (R)
58th (2004 - 2006)	1st	Dick Compton (R)	Bob Nonini (R)	Frank Henderson (R)
58th (2004 - 2006)	2nd	Dick Compton (R)	Bob Nonini (R)	Frank Henderson (R)
59th (2006 - 2008)	1st	Jim Hammond (R)	Bob Nonini (R)	Frank Henderson (R)
59th (2006 - 2008)	2nd	Jim Hammond (R)	Bob Nonini (R)	Frank Henderson (R)
60th (2008 - 2010)	1st	Jim Hammond (R)	Bob Nonini (R)	Frank Henderson (R)
60th (2008 - 2010)	2nd	Jim Hammond (R)	Bob Nonini (R)	Frank Henderson (R)
61st (2010 - 2012)	1st	Jim Hammond (R)	Bob Nonini (R)	Frank Henderson (R)
61st (2010 - 2012)	2nd	Jim Hammond (R)	Bob Nonini (R)	Frank Henderson (R)

=== 2012–2022 ===
District 5 currently consists of all of Benewah and Latah counties.

Legislature	Session	Senate	House Seat A	House Seat B
62nd (2012 - 2014)	1st	Dan Schmidt (D)	Cindy Agidius (R)	Shirley Ringo (D)
62nd (2012 - 2014)	2nd	Dan Schmidt (D)	Cindy Agidius (R)	Shirley Ringo (D)
63rd (2014 - 2016)	1st	Dan Schmidt (D)	Paulette Jordan (D)	Caroline Nilsson Troy (R)
63rd (2014 - 2016)	2nd	Dan Schmidt (D)	Paulette Jordan (D)	Caroline Nilsson Troy (R)
64th (2016 - 2018)	1st	Dan Foreman (R)	Paulette Jordan (D)	Caroline Nilsson Troy (R)
64th (2016 - 2018)	2nd	Dan Foreman (R)	Margie Gannon (D)	Caroline Nilsson Troy (R)
65th (2018 - 2020)	1st	David Nelson (D)	Bill Goesling (R)	Caroline Nilsson Troy (R)
65th (2018 - 2020)	2nd	David Nelson (D)	Bill Goesling (R)	Caroline Nilsson Troy (R)
66th (2020 - 2022)	1st	David Nelson (D)	Brandon Mitchell (R)	Caroline Nilsson Troy (R)
66th (2020 - 2022)	2nd	David Nelson (D)	Brandon Mitchell (R)	Caroline Nilsson Troy (R)

=== 2022–present ===
In December 2022, District 5 will consist of a portion of Kootenai County.

== See also ==
- List of Idaho senators
- List of Idaho representatives
