= Shirley Ringo =

American politician (born 1940)

Member of the Idaho House of Representatives
- In office December 1, 2002 – December 1, 2014
- Preceded by: Dan Mader (redistricting)
- Succeeded by: Caroline Nilsson Troy
- Constituency: 6th district Seat B (2002–2012); 5th district Seat B (2012–2014)
- In office December 1, 1998 – December 1, 2000
- Preceded by: Maynard Miller
- Succeeded by: Gary F. Young
- Constituency: 5th district Seat B (1998–2000)

Personal details
- Born: October 29, 1940 (age 85) Fort Collins, Colorado, U.S.
- Party: Democratic
- Education: Washington State University
- Profession: Teacher
- Website: shirleyringo.com

Shirley G. Ringo (born October 29, 1940) is a former Democratic Idaho state representative since 2002, representing District 5 in the B seat since the 2012 redistrict, District 6 seat B prior to 2012.

Ringo previously served in the District 6 B seat from 1999 until 2000, and again from 2002 to 2014, when she unsuccessfully challenged incumbent Raúl Labrador for Idaho's 1st congressional district seat in the United States House of Representatives.

== Early life, education, and career ==
Ringo graduated from John R. Rogers High School. She earned both her bachelor's and master's in mathematics from Washington State University.

== Idaho House of Representatives ==
=== Committee assignments ===
2013-2014

- Appropriations
- Judiciary, Rules, and Administration
- Transportation and Defense
- Joint Finance - Appropriations
- Joint Legislative Oversight

== Election history ==
District 5 - part of Latah County
| Year | Candidate | Votes | Pct | Candidate | Votes | Pct |
|---|---|---|---|---|---|---|
| 1998 primary | Shirley Ringo | 1,729 | 100% | | | |
| 1998 general | Shirley Ringo | 5,790 | 50.4% | Maynard Miller | 5,688 | 49.6% |
| 2000 primary | Shirley Ringo | 1,653 | 100% | | | |
| 2000 general | Gary Young | 7,362 | 51.0% | Shirley Ringo | 7,067 | 49.0% |

District 6 - Latah County
| Year | Candidate | Votes | Pct | Candidate | Votes | Pct |
|---|---|---|---|---|---|---|
| 2002 primary | Shirley Ringo | 1,353 | 100% | | | |
| 2002 general | Shirley Ringo | 6,179 | 53.2% | Gary Young | | |
| 2004 primary | Shirley Ringo | 1,096 | 100% | | | |
| 2004 general | Shirley Ringo | 9,272 | 55.3% | Earl Bennett | | |
| 2006 primary | Shirley Ringo | 1,086 | 100% | | | |
| 2006 general | Shirley Ringo | 7,329 | 61.56% | Roger Falen | | |
| 2008 primary | Shirley Ringo | 1,037 | 100% | | | |
| 2008 general | Shirley Ringo | 9,773 | 57.6% | Bob Hassoldt | | |
| 2010 primary | Shirley Ringo | 1,309 | 100% | | | |
| 2010 general | Shirley Ringo | 6,748 | 55.4% | Ike Young | | |

District 5 - Latah and Benewah counties
| Year | Candidate | Votes | Pct | Candidate | Votes | Pct |
|---|---|---|---|---|---|---|
| 2012 primary | Shirley Ringo | 1,256 | 100% | | | |
| 2012 general | Shirley Ringo | 10,739 | 53.6% | Ken De Vries | 9,293 | 46.4% |

Idaho's 1st congressional district
| Year | Candidate | Votes | Pct | Candidate | Votes | Pct |
|---|---|---|---|---|---|---|
| 2014 primary | Shirley Ringo | 9,047 | 82.0% | Ryan Andrew Barone | 1,981 | 18.0% |
| 2014 general | Raul Labrador | 143,580 | 65.0% | Shirley Ringo | 77,277 | 35.0% |

=== 2014 ===
In August 2013, Ringo announced she would not run for reelection to the Idaho Legislature and would instead seek the Democratic nomination for U.S. House in Idaho's 1st congressional district. She unsuccessfully challenged Republican incumbent Raúl Labrador, who won on November 4, 2014.
