= Marc Gibbs =

American politician from Idaho

Member of the Idaho House of Representatives from the 32A district
- In office December 1, 2012 – December 1, 2022
- Preceded by: Janice McGeachin
- Succeeded by: Stephanie Mickelsen

Member of the Idaho House of Representatives from the 31A district
- In office December 1, 2008 – December 1, 2012
- Preceded by: Larry Bradford
- Succeeded by: Neil Anderson

Personal details
- Party: Republican
- Spouse: Bonne Gibbs
- Children: 2
- Education: Utah State University (BS)

Marc Gibbs is an American politician who served as a member of Idaho House of Representatives for the 32A district from 2012 to 2022. He previously represented the 31A district from 2008 to 2012.

== Elections ==
=== House of Representatives District 32 Seat A ===
==== 2016 ====
Gibbs was unopposed in the Republican primary and the general election.

==== 2014 ====
Gibbs was unopposed in the Republican primary.

Gibbs defeated Alice Stevenson, earning 73.5% of the vote.

==== 2012 ====
Redistricted to 32A, Gibbs was unopposed in the Republican primary.

Gibbs defeated Bob Fitzgerald, earning 79.1% of the vote.

=== House of Representatives District 31 Seat A ===
==== 2010 ====
Gibbs was unopposed in the Republican primary and the general election.

==== 2008 ====
When four-term Republican Representatives Larry C. Bradford retired and left the seat open, Gibbs won the May 27, 2008, Republican primary with 3,166 votes (46.7%) against Neal Larson and Rex Steele;

Gibbs was unopposed for the general election.

== Personal life ==
Gibbs's father was Jack Gibbs (d.1972), a cattle and potato farmer in Idaho. Gibbs' mother was Afton Allsop Gibbs (1916–2015).

In 1970, Gibbs earned a Bachelor of Science degree in finance from Utah State University. In 1972, Gibbs became the president and owner of Gibbs Farms.

Gibbs's wife is Bonne Gibbs. They have two children. Gibbs and his family live in Grace, Idaho.

== Awards ==
- 2015 Eastern Idaho Agriculture Hall of Fame.
- 2020 Ag All Star. Presented by Food Producers of Idaho in Boise, Idaho.
