= Fred Wood (politician) =

American politician

Member of the Idaho House of Representatives from the 27th district
- In office December 1, 2006 – November 30, 2022
- Preceded by: Bruce Newcomb
- Succeeded by: Clay Handy

Personal details
- Born: December 1, 1945 (age 80) Washington, D.C., U.S.
- Party: Republican
- Education: Tulane University (BS, MD)

Military service
- Allegiance: United States
- Branch/service: United States Air Force

Fredrick Leslie Wood III (born December 1, 1945) is an American physician and politician who served as a member of the Idaho House of Representatives from 2006 to 2022.

== Early life and education ==
Wood was raised in Homedale, Idaho. Beginning in the eighth grade, Wood attended Georgia Military Academy. He earned his bachelor's degree from Tulane University and his medical degree from Tulane University School of Medicine, after which he served in the United States Air Force.

== Career ==
Wood moved to Burley in 1977 where he was a practicing physician. From 1996 to 2004, Wood served on the Idaho Fish and Game Commission.

When long-time legislator and former Speaker of the Idaho House of Representatives Bruce Newcomb decided to not seek reelection in 2006, Wood entered a four-way race for the Republican nomination which he won. He has run unopposed each term since. In the House, Wood served as chair of the Heath and Welfare Committee.

== Elections ==
District 27 House Seat B - Cassia, Oneida, and Power Counties and part of Bingham County
Year	Candidate	Votes	Pct	Candidate	Votes	Pct	Candidate	Votes	Pct	Candidate	Votes	Pct
2006 Primary	Fred Wood	2,308	46.0%	Timothy Deeg	1,837	36.6%	Jim Paskett	668	13.3%	Ben Maggart	205	4.1%
2006 General	Fred Wood	8,729	100%									
2008 Primary	Fred Wood (incumbent)	4,276	100%									
2008 General	Fred Wood (incumbent)	11,470	100%									
2010 Primary	Fred Wood (incumbent)	5,312	100%									
2010 General	Fred Wood (incumbent)	8,864	100%									

District 27 House Seat B - Cassia and Minidoka Counties.
Year	Candidate	Votes	Pct
2012 Primary	Fred Wood (incumbent)	5,952	100%
2012 General	Fred Wood (incumbent)	13,232	100%
2014 Primary	Fred Wood (incumbent)	4,963	100%
2014 General	Fred Wood (incumbent)	8,789	100%
2016 Primary	Fred Wood (incumbent)	4,618	100%
2016 General	Fred Wood (incumbent)	13,060	100%
