= Ryan Kerby =

American politician and educator from Idaho

Member of the Idaho House of Representatives from the District 9 seat A district
- In office December 1, 2014 – November 30, 2022
- Preceded by: Lawerence Denney
- Succeeded by: Jacyn Gallagher

Personal details
- Born: Clearwater River, Idaho
- Party: Republican
- Spouse: Kathy Kerby
- Education: Biola College, College of Idaho, University of Idaho.
- Occupation: Politician, educator

Ryan Kerby is an American politician and former educator from Idaho. Kerby is a former Republican member of Idaho House of Representatives from District 9, seat A.

== Early life ==
Kerby was born in Clearwater River, Idaho.

== Education ==
Kerby earned a Bachelor of Science degree in Math from Biola College in La Mirada, California. Kerby earned a Master's degree from College of Idaho. Kerby completed educational specialist from University of Idaho.

== Career ==
Kerby was a superintendent of New Plymouth School District for 21 years until his retirement in June 2015.

On November 4, 2014, Kerby won the election and became a Republican member of Idaho House of Representatives for District 9, seat A. Kerby defeated Steve Worthley with 76.5% of the votes. On November 8, 2016, as an incumbent, Kerby won the election and continued serving District 9, seat A. Kerby defeated Rejeana A. Goolsby with 81.1% of the votes. On November 6, 2018, as an incumbent, Kerby won the election and continued serving District 9, seat A. Kerby defeated Allen Schmid with 75.9% of the votes.

In legislation, in December 2019 Kerby became the Vice chairman of House Education Committee.

== Personal life ==
Kerby's wife is Kathy Kerby, a school nurse.
