= Randy Armstrong (politician) =

American politician

Member of the Idaho House of Representatives from the 28A district
- In office December 1, 2016 – December 1, 2022
- Preceded by: Ken Andrus
- Succeeded by: Richard Cheatum

Personal details
- Born: Bannock County, Idaho
- Party: Republican
- Spouse: Paige
- Education: Idaho State University

Randy Armstrong is an American politician. He is a Republican who represented District 28A in the Idaho House of Representatives.

== Early life ==
Armstrong was born in Bannock County, Idaho. He holds a Bachelor of Science degree in Business from Idaho State University.

== Political career ==
In 2016, Ken Andrus decided not to run for re-election to seat 28A in the Idaho House of Representatives, and Armstrong ran for his seat. He won a four-way Republican primary, and went on to win the general election against Democrat Steve Landon. He won re-election in 2018, and is running again in 2020.

Armstrong sat on the following committees:

- Agricultural Affairs
- Business
- State Affairs

=== Electoral record ===
2016 Republican primary: Idaho House of Representatives, Seat 28A
Party	Candidate	Votes	%
Republican	Randy Armstrong	2,007	48.57%
Republican	Tari L. Jensen	757	18.32%
Republican	Kay Jenkins	731	17.69%
Republican	Lance B. Kolbet	637	15.42%

2016 general election: Idaho House of Representatives, Seat 28A
Party	Candidate	Votes	%
Republican	Randy Armstrong	12,499	64.96%
Democratic	Steve Landon	6,741	35.04%

2018 general election: Idaho House of Representatives, Seat 28A
Party	Candidate	Votes	%
Republican	Randy Armstrong	10,279	62.5%
Democratic	Steve Landon	6,155	37.5%
