= Gary Marshall (politician) =

American farmer, educator and politician from Idaho

Member of the Idaho House of Representatives from District 30, Seat A
- In office December 1, 2018 – December 1, 2022
- Preceded by: Jeff Thompson
- Succeeded by: David Cannon (redistricting)

Personal details
- Party: Republican
- Spouse: Ramona Marshall
- Children: 7
- Education: Brigham Young University
- Occupation: Farmer, educator and politician

Gary L. Marshall is an American farmer, educator and politician in Idaho. Marshall is a former Republican member of Idaho House of Representatives for District 30, seat A.

== Early life ==
Marshall grew up in Osgood, Idaho. Marshall graduated from Bonneville High School in Idaho Falls, Idaho.

== Education ==
Marshall earned a Bachelor of Arts degree in political science and history from Brigham Young University. Marshall earned a certificate in secondary education from BYU. Marshall earned a master's degree in educational administration from BYU.

== Career ==
As an educator, Marshall was a teacher and administrator at Idaho Falls Public School District. Marshall was a professor, department chair and division chair at Brigham Young University-Idaho's Ricks College. Marshall was a second dean of College of Education at Brigham Young University-Idaho.

Marshall is a farmer in Idaho.

On November 6, 2018, Marshall won the election and became a Republican member of Idaho House of Representatives for District 30, seat A. Marshall defeated Pat Tucker with 72.6% of the votes.

== Personal life ==
Marshall's wife is Ramona Marshall. They have seven children. Marshall and his family live in Idaho Falls, Idaho.
