= Clark Kauffman =

American politician from Idaho

Member of the Idaho House of Representatives from District 25 Seat B
- In office December 1, 2012 – November 30, 2022
- Preceded by: Donna Pence (redistricting)
- Succeeded by: Greg Lanting (redistricting)

Personal details
- Born: Twin Falls, Idaho, U.S.
- Party: Republican
- Spouse: Debbie Kauffman
- Children: 2
- Website: clarkkauffman.com

Military service
- Allegiance: United States
- Branch/service: United States Air Force
- Years of service: 1968–1972

Clark Kauffman is an American politician from Idaho. Kauffman is a former Republican member of Idaho House of Representatives representing District 25 in the B seat from 2012 to 2022.

== Early life ==
Kauffman was born in Twin Falls, Idaho. Kauffman graduated from Filer High School.

== Career ==
In 1968, Kauffman served in the United States Air Force, until 1972.

Kauffman and his wife Debbie are owner and operator of Kauffman Farm in Idaho.

On November 6, 2012, Kauffman won the election and became a Republican member of Idaho House of Representatives for District 25, seat B. On November 4, 2014, as an incumbent, Kauffman won the election unopposed and continued serving District 25, seat B. On November 8, 2016, as an incumbent, Kauffman won the election unopposed and continued serving District 25, seat B. On November 6, 2018, as an incumbent, Kauffman won the election unopposed and continued serving District 25, seat B.

== Election history ==
District 25 House Seat B - Jerome County and part of Twin Falls County
Year	Candidate	Votes	Pct	Candidate	Votes	Pct
2012 Primary	Clark Kauffman	2,382	53.4%	David Funk	2,079	46.6%
2012 General	Clark Kauffman	11,148	71.2%	Cindy Shotswell	4,503	28.8%
2014 Primary	Clark Kauffman (incumbent)	3,734	100%			
2014 General	Clark Kauffman (incumbent)	9,259	100%			
2016 Primary	Clark Kauffman (incumbent)	4,257	100%			
2016 General	Clark Kauffman (incumbent)	14,713	100%			

== Personal life ==
Kauffman's wife is Debbie Kauffman. They have two children. Kauffman and his family live in Filer, Idaho.
