= James Holtzclaw =

American state representative in Idaho

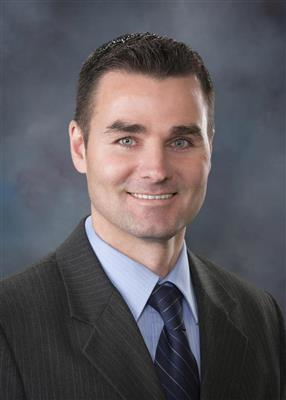

Member of the Idaho House of Representatives from District 20 Seat B
- Incumbent
- Assumed office December 1, 2012
- Preceded by: Marv Hagedorn

Personal details
- Born: October 6, 1975 (age 50) Rome, Georgia
- Party: Republican
- Children: 1
- Education: George Fox University
- Profession: Real estate broker
- Website: www.holtzclawforidaho.com

Military service
- Branch/service: United States Air Force
- Years of service: 10

James Holtzclaw (born October 6, 1975) is a Republican Idaho State Representative and a United States Air Force veteran, currently representing District 20 in Meridian, Idaho.

== Early life, education, and career ==
James Holtzclaw was born October 6, 1975, in Rome, Georgia. After high school, he joined the United States Air Force, where he served for 10 years with 5 overseas deployments. He is a lifetime member of the Veterans of Foreign Wars and a member of the American Legion, Post 113.

He attended George Fox University. where he earned his BA in management.

In 2015, Idaho governor Butch Otter awarded Holtzclaw the Meritorious Service Medal for his service with the Idaho Military Division after recommendations by the Idaho Military Division's two JAG Officers, LTC Paul Boice and CPT Stephen Stokes.

Holtzclaw is currently a local business owner and an Associate Real Estate Broker for RE/MAX in Meridian, Idaho.

== Elections ==
=== Idaho House of Representatives District 20 Seat B ===
==== 2018 ====
Holtzclaw ran unopposed in the Republican Primary for District 20 B.

Holtzclaw won the 2018 general election with 14,341 votes (100%).

==== 2016 ====
Holtzclaw was opposed by Randy Drew Johnson in the Republican Primary for District 20 B via write in whom he beat earning 98.7% of the vote.

He was unopposed in the general election.

==== 2014 ====
Holtzclaw ran unopposed in the Republican Primary for District 20 B.

Holtzclaw won the 2014 general election with 9,077 votes (82.2%) against perennial candidate Daniel S. Weston of the Constitution Party.

==== 2012 ====
Holtzclaw challenged Republican Representative Marv Hagedorn for the District 20 B seat; Hagedorn redistricted to District 14 and successfully ran for its senate seat. Holtzclaw won the three-way May 15, 2012 Republican Primary with 1,035 votes (41.8%).

Holtzclaw was unopposed for the November 6, 2012 General election, winning with 14,706 votes.

=== 2007 Meridian mayoral campaign ===
Holztclaw lost to incumbent Tammy de Weerd earning 37.46% of the vote.

== Committee assignments ==
2020 Session

- Commerce & Human Resources (Chair)
- State Affairs
- Transportation & Defense

2019 Session

- Commerce & Human Resources (Chair)
- State Affairs
- Transportation & Defense

2018 Session

- Commerce & Human Resources
- State Affairs
- Transportation & Defense

2017 Session

- Commerce & Human Resources
- State Affairs
- Transportation & Defense
