= Caroline Nilsson Troy =

American politician

Member of the Idaho House of Representatives
- In office December 1, 2014 – November 30, 2022
- Preceded by: Shirley Ringo
- Succeeded by: Tony Wisniewski (redistricting)
- Constituency: 5th district Seat B

Personal details
- Born: August 1962 (age 63) Lewiston, Idaho, U.S.
- Party: Republican
- Spouse: David Troy (m. 2000)
- Children: 4
- Education: University of Idaho (BS)
- Website: troyforidaho.com

Caroline Nilsson Troy (born 1962) is an American politician who served as a member of the Idaho House of Representatives from the 5th district. Elected in November 2014, she assumed office on December 1, 2014.

== Early life and education ==
Born Caroline Nilsson, she was raised in Lewiston, where she attended St. Stanislaus Catholic School. In 1971, her family moved to Botswana, where her father managed a research farm. The family returned to Idaho in 1977 to work on their large farm and ranch operation in Latah, Clearwater, and Nez Perce counties. Nilsson graduated from Orofino High School. She earned a Bachelor of Science degree in communications from the University of Idaho in 1984.

== Career ==
After graduating from college, Nilsson moved to Southwick, where she worked in farming and ranching on family land north of the Nez Percé Indian Reservation.

In 1992, Nilsson began her career as a professional fundraiser, starting at Tri-State Hospital Foundation in Clarkston, Washington. She also became active in Republican Party politics. Later, she worked in development for the University of Idaho and Washington State University. She started her own business and is the president of Nilsson Advisory Group, which helps non-profits secure private support.

=== Idaho House of Representatives ===
==== 2020 ====
Troy was unopposed in the Republican primary. Troy defeated two opponents in the general election, Democratic nominee Renee Love and Constitution Party nominee James Hartley with 55.4% of the vote.

==== 2018 ====
Troy was unopposed in the Republican primary. Troy defeated Democratic nominee Laurene Sorensen with 53.7% of the vote.

==== 2016 ====
Troy was unopposed in the Republican primary. Troy defeated two opponents in the general election, Democrat Laurene Sorensen and Independent Ken De Vries, with 50.1% of the vote.

==== 2014 ====
When long-time Democratic state legislator Shirley Ringo decided to run for Congress in 2014, Nilsson Troy became a candidate for her seat in District 5B, running unopposed in the Republican primary. In the general election she defeated Democrat Gary Osborn, of Troy and Independent David Suswal of Deary, winning with a plurality of 606 votes.

==== Committee assignments ====
- Agricultural Affairs Committee
- Appropriations Committee
- Joint Finance-Appropriations Committee
- Joint Legislative Oversight Committee
- Judiciary, Rules and Administration Committee

Troy previously served on the Health and Welfare Committee from 2014 to 2016, the Business Committee from 2014 to 2018, and the Revenue and Taxation Committee from 2016 to 2018.

== Personal life ==
She is married to Dave Troy, owner of Troy Insurance in Lewiston. They reside in Genesee, Idaho and have four daughters.

== Election history ==
District 5, Seat B
Year	Candidate	Votes	Pct	Candidate	Votes	Pct	Candidate	Votes	Pct
2014 Primary	Caroline Nilsson Troy	1,818	100%						
2014 General	Caroline Nilsson Troy	7,051	49.8%	Gary Osborn	6,445	45.5%	David Suswal	676	4.8%
2016 Primary	Caroline Nilsson Troy	2,282	100%						
2016 General	Caroline Nilsson Troy	11,112	50.1%	Laurene Sorensen	8,589	38.7%	Ken De Vries	2,507	11.3%
2018 Primary	Caroline Nilsson Troy	3,487	100%						
2018 General	Caroline Nilsson Troy	10,403	53.7%	Laurene Sorensen	8,957	46.3%			
2020 Primary	Caroline Nilsson Troy	4,556	100%						
2020 General	Caroline Nilsson Troy	13,968	55.5%	Renee Love	10,279	40.8%	James Hartley	942	3.7%
