= Scott Syme =

American politician from Idaho

Member of the Idaho House of Representatives from the District 11, seat A district
- In office December 1, 2016 – December 1, 2022
- Preceded by: Gayle Batt
- Succeeded by: Judy Boyle (redistricting)

Personal details
- Born: Weiser, Idaho
- Party: Republican
- Spouse: Patti Syme
- Children: 4
- Military career
- Allegiance: United States
- Branch: United States Army
- Service years: 1982–2014
- Rank: Colonel
- Unit: United States Army Reserve

Scott Syme is an American politician from Idaho. Syme is a former Republican member of Idaho House of Representatives for District 11, seat A.

== Early life ==
Syme was born in Weiser, Idaho. Syme is a 5th-generation native of Idaho. Syme graduated from Weiser High School.

== Education ==
In 1976, Syme earned a Bachelor of Arts degree in Business Administration from the College of Idaho. Syme graduated from United States Army Command and General Staff College and also graduated from Combined Arms Services and Services Staff School. He attended University of Puget Sound.

== Career ==
In 1982, Syme served in the United States Army Reserve, until 2014. Syme has served two tours in Iraq. Syme retired from the military as a colonel. Syme also served as a consultant and advisor for the United States Army.

In 1991, Syme became the owner of Syme Farm in Idaho (not to be confused with Syme Farms located in Weiser, Idaho). In 2008, Syme became the co-owner of Syme Real Estate in Caldwell, Idaho.

On May 27, 2008, Syme sought for a seat in the United States Senate unsuccessfully in the Republican Primary Election. Syme was defeated by Jim Risch with 65.3% of the votes. Syme received 13.5% of the votes.

On November 8, 2016, Syme won the election and became a Republican member of Idaho House of Representatives for District 11, seat A. Syme defeated Edward Savala with 80.4% of the votes. On November 6, 2018, as an incumbent, Syme won the election unopposed and continued serving District 11, seat A.

== Personal life ==
Syme's wife is Patti Syme. She served as Chairman of the Canyon County Republicans from June 2020 to May 2022. They have four children. Syme and his family live in Wilder, Idaho.
