= Tony Wisniewski =

American politician and manufacturing engineer from Idaho

Member of the Idaho House of Representatives
- Incumbent
- Assumed office December 1, 2022
- Preceded by: Caroline Nilsson Troy
- In office December 1, 2018 – December 1, 2022
- Preceded by: Don Cheatham
- Succeeded by: Jordan Redman
- Constituency: 5B district (2022–present); 3B district (2018–2022)

Personal details
- Born: April 19, 1951 (age 75) Los Angeles, California, U.S.
- Party: Republican
- Spouse: Melody Wisniewski
- Children: 5
- Education: Utah State University (BS)

Tony Wisniewski (born April 19, 1951) is an American politician and manufacturing engineer serving as a Republican member of Idaho House of Representatives the 5B district.

== Early life and education ==
Wisniewski was born in Los Angeles, California. In 1973, he earned a Bachelor of Science degree in mechanical engineering from Utah State University.

== Career ==
In 1988, Wisniewski became a principal manufacturing engineer for Digital Equipment Corporation, until 1996.

In 1996, Wisniewski became a senior manufacturing engineer with Esterline Advanced Input Systems,. In 2000, Wisniewski became a senior manufacturing engineer for Telect. In 2001, Wisniewski became a manufacturing engineer for Hotstart Incorporated, until 2017.

In November 2018, Wisniewski won the election and became a Republican member of Idaho House of Representatives for the 3B district. Wisniewski defeated Dan Hanks with 70.8% of the votes.

In 2026, Wisniewski introduced a resolution which called for the U.S. Supreme Court to overturn Obergefell v. Hodges and define marriage as between a man and a woman. It passed the House 44–26 on March 10 2026.

== Personal life ==
Wisniewski's wife is Melody Wisniewski. They have five children. Wisniewski and his family live in Post Falls, Idaho.
