= Gregory Chaney =

American politician

Greg Chaney
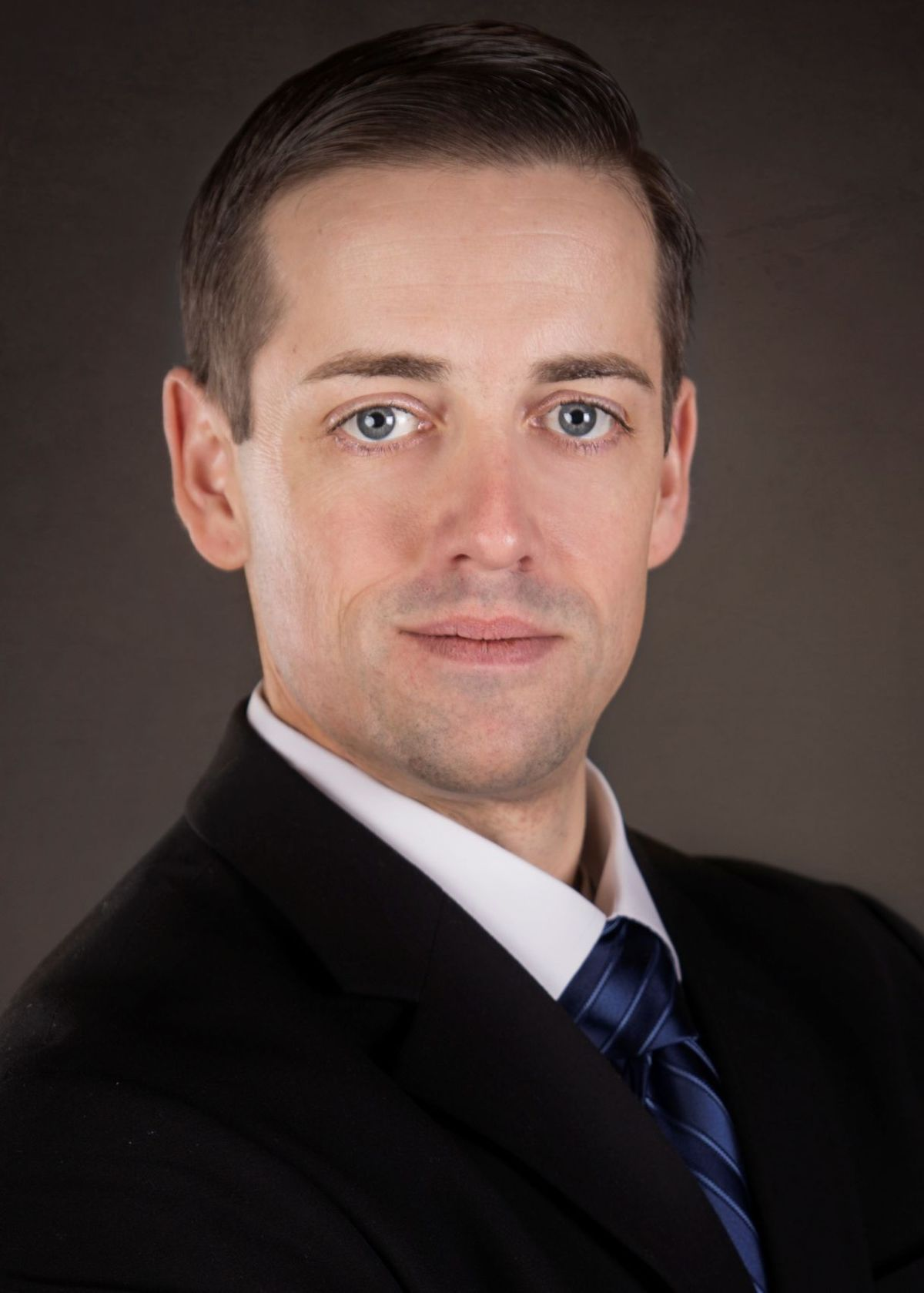

Member of the Idaho House of Representatives from the 10B district
- In office December 1, 2014 – December 1, 2022
- Succeeded by: Bruce Skaug (redistricting)

Personal details
- Born: Hermiston, Oregon, U.S.
- Party: Republican
- Spouse: Sarah
- Children: 6
- Education: Boise State University (BA); Concordia University School of Law (JD)
- Website: chaneyforidaho.com

Military service
- Branch/service: United States Marine Corps
- Unit: United States Marine Corps Reserve

Gregory Dallas Chaney (born July 21, 1981) is an American attorney and politician. He was as a Republican member of the Idaho House of Representatives from 2014 to 2022, where he represented the 10B district.

== Early life and education ==
Chaney graduated from Kuna High School, being active in Future Farmers of America and 4-H. Chaney attended Boise State University where he received a B.A. in communications and political science and Concordia University School of Law where he earned his Juris Doctor.

== Career ==
Chaney worked with the Nampa Police Department briefly in 2007. He also served in the United States Marine Corps Reserve. Currently, he is an attorney and owns his own law firm in Caldwell.

Chaney chaired the House Judiciary Committee when he served in the Idaho Legislature. He maintains that Idaho Freedom Foundation supported members of the Republican Party are more willing to engage in personal attacks and mislead the public which makes it more difficult to pass certain bills and maintain a unified party.

== Elections ==
In 2014, Chaney faced two write-in candidates, Brian Bishop and Kent Marmon, during the Republican primary, defeating both with 58.8% of the vote. Challengers Leif Skyving (Democrat), Gordon Council (Independent) and Eugene Smith (Libertarian) were defeated in the general election where Chaney won with 53.6% of the vote.

In 2016, Chaney was unopposed in the Republican primary. He defeated Warren T. Stevens with 67.42% in the general election.

In 2022, Chaney ran and lost in the open Senate seat (due to redistricting) in Caldwell District 11.

== Personal life ==
In 2009, Chaney was convicted of malicious injury to property after a dispute that ensued with his then girlfriend. He divorced the woman involved in the 2009 incident, entered into a new marriage, and joined a church. He credits God for turning his life around.

In 2021, Chaney's unvaccinated, 74-year-old mother died from COVID-19, and he believes that his mother was misled by misinformation about the vaccines.
