= Sally Toone =

American politician and educator

Member, Idaho House of Representatives, District 26B
- In office December 1, 2016 – December 1, 2022
- Preceded by: Donna Pence
- Succeeded by: Jack Nelsen

Personal details
- Born: St. Maries, Idaho
- Party: Democratic
- Spouse: Mark
- Children: 2
- Education: University of Idaho (BS)
- Occupation: Educator

Sally J. Toone is an American politician and educator who served in the Idaho House of Representatives. A member of the Democratic Party, Toone represented District 26B.

== Political career ==
In October 2015, former District 26B representatives Donna Pence announced she would not seek reelection, and Toone ran for the open seat. She was unopposed in the Democratic primary, and defeated Republican Alex Sutter in the general election. She was reelected in 2018 and 2020, but did not file for reelection for 2022.

As of June 2020, Toone sits on the following committees:

- Agricultural Affairs
- Business
- Education

=== Electoral record ===
2016 general election: Idaho House of Representatives, District 26B
Party	Candidate	Votes	%
Democratic	Sally Toone	9,808	54.11%
Republican	Alex Sutter	8,317	45.89%

2018 general election: Idaho House of Representatives, District 26B
Party	Candidate	Votes	%
Democratic	Sally Toone	9,767	58.2%
Republican	Mike McFayden	7,026	41.8%

2020 general election: Idaho House of Representatives, District 26B
Party	Candidate	Votes	%
Democratic	Sally Toone	11,888	54.7%
Republican	William Thorpe	9,845	45.3%

== Personal life ==
Toone was born in St. Maries, Idaho and holds a Bachelor of Science degree in Education from the University of Idaho. Her career includes working as a math teacher in the Wendell and Gooding school districts, and she is currently an Adult Educator and the College of Southern Idaho.
