= Rick Youngblood =

American politician from Idaho

Member of the Idaho House of Representatives from the 12B district
- In office December 1, 2012 – December 1, 2022
- Preceded by: Gary Collins
- Succeeded by: Jaron Crane

Personal details
- Born: Boise, Idaho, U.S.
- Party: Republican
- Education: Washington State University
- Website: youngbloodforidaho.com

Rick D. Youngblood (born in Boise, Idaho) is an American politician who served as a member of the Idaho House of Representatives for the 12B district. Elected in November 2012, he assumed office on December 1, 2012.

== Education ==
Youngblood graduated from Weiser High School. He attended North Idaho College before graduating from Washington State University.

== Elections ==
District 12 House Seat B - Part of Canyon County
Year	Candidate	Votes	Pct	Candidate	Votes	Pct	Candidate	Votes	Pct
2012 primary	Rick Youngblood	2,154	68.7%	Sherri Nible	778	24.8%	Aaron Gonzalez	204	6.5%
2012 general	Rick Youngblood	10,032	69.3%	Lawrence Dawson	4,447	30.7%			
2014 primary	Rick Youngblood	2,184	68.7%	Robert Muse	996	31.3%			
2014 general	Rick Youngblood	6,811	71.4%	Lawrence Dawson	2,732	28.6%			
2016 primary	Rick Youngblood	1,911	100%						
2016 general	Rick Youngblood	11,355	71.0%	Shana Tremaine	4,628	29.0%			
