= Steven Harris (politician) =

American politician from Idaho

Member of the Idaho House of Representatives from the 21A district
- In office December 1, 2012 – December 1, 2022
- Preceded by: John Vander Woude
- Succeeded by: James Petzke

Personal details
- Born: Salt Lake City, Utah, U.S.
- Party: Republican
- Education: Brigham Young University (MS)

Steven C. Harris is an American politician who served as a member of the Idaho House of Representatives for the 21A district from 2012 to 2022.

== Early life and education ==
Harris was born in Salt Lake City, Utah. He earned a Master of Science in technology management from Brigham Young University.

== Elections ==
District 21 House Seat A - Part of Ada County
Year	Candidate	Votes	Pct	Candidate	Votes	Pct	Candidate	Votes	Pct
2012 Primary	Steven Harris	1,509	49.3%	Robert Simison	1,192	38.9%	Parrish Miller	362	11.8%
2012 General	Steven Harris	12,675	64.6%	Craig Kreiser	6,942	35.4%			
2014 Primary	Steven Harris (incumbent)	3,138	100%						
2014 General	Steven Harris (incumbent)	11,181	100%						
2016 Primary	Steven Harris (incumbent)	2,190	100%						
2016 General	Steven Harris (incumbent)	14,391	65.5%	Robert Winder	7,586	34.5%			
