= Idaho's 11th legislative district =

American legislative district

Idaho's 11th legislative district is one of 35 districts of the Idaho Legislature. It is currently represented by Patti Anne Lodge, Republican of Huston, Scott Syme, Republican of Wilder, and Tammy Nichols, Republican of Nampa.

== District profile ==
=== 1992–2002 ===
From 1992 to 2002, District 11 consisted of a portion of Canyon County.

Legislature	Session	Senate	House Seat A	House Seat B
51st (1992 - 1994)	1st	Atwell Parry (R)	Robert Schaefer (R)	Bill Taylor (R)
51st (1992 - 1994)	2nd	Atwell Parry (R)	Robert Schaefer (R)	Bill Taylor (R)
52nd (1994 - 1996)	1st	Atwell Parry (R)	Robert Schaefer (R)	Bill Taylor (R)
52nd (1994 - 1996)	2nd	Atwell Parry (R)	Robert Schaefer (R)	Bill Taylor (R)
53rd (1996 - 1998)	1st	Atwell Parry (R)	Robert Schaefer (R)	Bill Taylor (R)
53rd (1996 - 1998)	2nd	Atwell Parry (R)	Robert Schaefer (R)	Bill Taylor (R)
54th (1998 - 2000)	1st	Atwell Parry (R)	Robert Schaefer (R)	Bill Taylor (R)
54th (1998 - 2000)	2nd	Atwell Parry (R)	Robert Schaefer (R)	Bill Taylor (R)
55th (2000 - 2002)	1st	Patti Anne Lodge (R)	Robert Schaefer (R)	Gary Collins (R)
55th (2000 - 2002)	2nd	Patti Anne Lodge (R)	Robert Schaefer (R)	Gary Collins (R)

=== 2002–2012 ===
From 2002 to 2012, District 11 consisted of all of Gem and a portion of Canyon County.

Legislature	Session	Senate	House Seat A	House Seat B
57th (2002 - 2004)	1st	Brad Little (R)	Kathy Skippen (R)	Gary W. Bauer (R)
57th (2002 - 2004)	2nd	Brad Little (R)	Kathy Skippen (R)	Gary W. Bauer (R)
58th (2004 - 2006)	1st	Brad Little (R)	Kathy Skippen (R)	Carlos Bilbao (R)
58th (2004 - 2006)	2nd	Brad Little (R)	Kathy Skippen (R)	Carlos Bilbao (R)
59th (2006 - 2008)	1st	Brad Little (R)	Steven Thayn (R)	Carlos Bilbao (R)
59th (2006 - 2008)	2nd	Brad Little (R)	Steven Thayn (R)	Carlos Bilbao (R)
60th (2008 - 2010)	1st	Melinda Smyser (R)	Steven Thayn (R)	Carlos Bilbao (R)
60th (2008 - 2010)	2nd	Melinda Smyser (R)	Steven Thayn (R)	Carlos Bilbao (R)
61st (2010 - 2012)	1st	Melinda Smyser (R)	Steven Thayn (R)	Carlos Bilbao (R)
61st (2010 - 2012)	2nd	Melinda Smyser (R)	Steven Thayn (R)	Carlos Bilbao (R)

=== 2012–2022 ===
District 11 currently consists of a portion of Canyon County.

Legislature	Session	Senate	House Seat A	House Seat B
62nd (2012 - 2014)	1st	Patti Anne Lodge (R)	Gayle Batt (R)	Christy Perry (R)
62nd (2012 - 2014)	2nd	Patti Anne Lodge (R)	Gayle Batt (R)	Christy Perry (R)
63rd (2014 - 2016)	1st	Patti Anne Lodge (R)	Gayle Batt (R)	Christy Perry (R)
63rd (2014 - 2016)	2nd	Patti Anne Lodge (R)	Gayle Batt (R)	Christy Perry (R)
64th (2016 - 2018)	1st	Patti Anne Lodge (R)	Scott Syme (R)	Christy Perry (R)
64th (2016 - 2018)	2nd	Patti Anne Lodge (R)	Scott Syme (R)	Christy Perry (R)
65th (2018 - 2020)	1st	Patti Anne Lodge (R)	Scott Syme (R)	Tammy Nichols (R)
65th (2018 - 2020)	2nd	Patti Anne Lodge (R)	Scott Syme (R)	Tammy Nichols (R)
66th (2020 - 2022)	1st	Patti Anne Lodge (R)	Scott Syme (R)	Tammy Nichols (R)
66th (2020 - 2022)	2nd	Patti Anne Lodge (R)	Scott Syme (R)	Tammy Nichols (R)

=== 2022–present ===
In December 2022, District 11 will consist of a portion of Canyon County.

== See also ==
- List of Idaho senators
- List of Idaho representatives
