= Idaho's 12th legislative district =

American legislative district

Idaho's 12th legislative district is one of 35 districts of the Idaho Legislature. It is currently represented by Todd Lakey, Republican of Nampa, Robert Anderst, Republican of Nampa, and Rick Youngblood, Republican of Nampa.

== District profile ==
=== 1992–2002 ===
From 1992 to 2002, District 12 consisted of a portion of Canyon County.

Legislature	Session	Senate	House Seat A	House Seat B
51st (1992 - 1994)	1st	Jerry Thorne (R)	Dolores Crow (R)	Bill Deal (R)
51st (1992 - 1994)	2nd	Jerry Thorne (R)	Dolores Crow (R)	Bill Deal (R)
52nd (1994 - 1996)	1st	Jerry Thorne (R)	Dolores Crow (R)	Bill Deal (R)
52nd (1994 - 1996)	2nd	Jerry Thorne (R)	Dolores Crow (R)	Bill Deal (R)
53rd (1996 - 1998)	1st	Jerry Thorne (R)	Dolores Crow (R)	Bill Deal (R)
53rd (1996 - 1998)	2nd	Jerry Thorne (R)	Dolores Crow (R)	Bill Deal (R)
54th (1998 - 2000)	1st	Jerry Thorne (R)	Dolores Crow (R)	Bill Deal (R)
54th (1998 - 2000)	2nd	Jerry Thorne (R)	Dolores Crow (R)	Bill Deal (R)
55th (2000 - 2002)	1st	Jerry Thorne (R)	Dolores Crow (R)	Bill Deal (R)
55th (2000 - 2002)	2nd	Jerry Thorne (R)	Dolores Crow (R)	Bill Deal (R)

=== 2002–2012 ===
From 2002 to 2012, District 12 consisted of a portion of Canyon County.

Legislature	Session	Senate	House Seat A	House Seat B
57th (2002 - 2004)	1st	Curt McKenzie (R)	Robert Schaefer (R)	Gary Collins (R)
57th (2002 - 2004)	2nd	Curt McKenzie (R)	Robert Schaefer (R)	Gary Collins (R)
58th (2004 - 2006)	1st	Curt McKenzie (R)	Robert Schaefer (R)	Gary Collins (R)
58th (2004 - 2006)	2nd	Curt McKenzie (R)	Robert Schaefer (R)	Gary Collins (R)
59th (2006 - 2008)	1st	Curt McKenzie (R)	Robert Schaefer (R)	Gary Collins (R)
59th (2006 - 2008)	2nd	Curt McKenzie (R)	Robert Schaefer (R)	Gary Collins (R)
60th (2008 - 2010)	1st	Curt McKenzie (R)	Robert Schaefer (R)	Gary Collins (R)
60th (2008 - 2010)	2nd	Curt McKenzie (R)	Robert Schaefer (R)	Gary Collins (R)
61st (2010 - 2012)	1st	Curt McKenzie (R)	Robert Schaefer (R)	Gary Collins (R)
61st (2010 - 2012)	2nd	Curt McKenzie (R)	Robert Schaefer (R)	Gary Collins (R)

=== 2012–2022 ===
District 12 currently consists of a portion Canyon County.

Legislature	Session	Senate	House Seat A	House Seat B
62nd (2012 - 2014)	1st	Todd Lakey (R)	Robert Anderst (R)	Rick Youngblood (R)
62nd (2012 - 2014)	2nd	Todd Lakey (R)	Robert Anderst (R)	Rick Youngblood (R)
63rd (2014 - 2016)	1st	Todd Lakey (R)	Robert Anderst (R)	Rick Youngblood (R)
63rd (2014 - 2016)	2nd	Todd Lakey (R)	Robert Anderst (R)	Rick Youngblood (R)
64th (2016 - 2018)	1st	Todd Lakey (R)	Robert Anderst (R)	Rick Youngblood (R)
64th (2016 - 2018)	2nd	Todd Lakey (R)	Robert Anderst (R)	Rick Youngblood (R)
65th (2018 - 2020)	1st	Todd Lakey (R)	Robert Anderst (R)	Rick Youngblood (R)
65th (2018 - 2020)	2nd	Todd Lakey (R)	Robert Anderst (R)	Rick Youngblood (R)
66th (2020 - 2022)	1st	Todd Lakey (R)	Bruce Skaug (R)	Rick Youngblood (R)
66th (2020 - 2022)	2nd	Todd Lakey (R)	Bruce Skaug (R)	Rick Youngblood (R)

=== 2022–present ===
Beginning in December 2022, District 12 will consist of a portion Canyon County.

== See also ==
- List of Idaho senators
- List of Idaho representatives
