= List of U.S. state firearms =

U.S. states with an official state firearm.

A state firearm has been designated by 11 states in the United States: Alaska, Arizona, Arkansas, Utah, Indiana, Kentucky, Pennsylvania, West Virginia, Tennessee, Texas, and Missouri.

Utah was the first U.S. state to designate an official state firearm in March 2011.

== Table of state firearms ==
State	Firearm	Image	Date of adoption	Note	Source
Alaska	Pre-1964 Winchester Model 70		July 2014	The bill, sponsored by Senate President Charlie Huggins, refers to the gun as the "rifleman's rifle." The bill says the gun helped Alaskans "establish a firm foothold" in the wilderness between 1930 and 1963	
Arizona	Colt Single Action Army revolver		April 2011		
Idaho	Winchester Model 1873		November 2026		
Indiana	Grouseland Rifle	—N/a	March 2012	This rifle is kept at Grouseland, the home of President William Henry Harrison, and was made between 1803 and 1812 by John Small, who later became the first sheriff in the state. "This rifle and its maker are both integral parts of Indiana history, and as such, the rifle is worthy of its designation as the Indiana State Rifle," said Senator John Waterman.	
Kentucky	Kentucky long rifle		June 25, 2013		
Missouri	Hawken rifle		July 6, 2023		
Pennsylvania	Pennsylvania long rifle	—N/a	June 26, 2014		
Tennessee	Barrett M82		February 24, 2016	The rifle was designed by Ronnie Barrett, a native of Murfreesboro, Tennessee.	
Texas	Colt Walker		May 24, 2021	State handgun; this revolver was developed by Samuel Colt for Samuel Hamilton Walker, a Texas Ranger.	
Texas	Cannon		May 29, 2025	State gun; cannons played a pivotal role during the Texas Revolution, including the Battle of Gonzales.	
Utah	M1911 pistol		March 2011	This gun was designed by Ogden, Utah native John Browning. The adoption was supported by Republican Utah State Representative Carl Wimmer, who said, "It does capture a portion of Utah's history" and "even bigger than that, it captures a portion of American history." The adoption was opposed by Democratic Utah State Representative Brian King who said, "When we are talking about a state symbol we would do well to come up with one that is more unifying than divisive and this is a very divisive symbol for obvious reasons. This is just a poor choice for a state symbol".	
West Virginia	Hall Model 1819 flintlock rifle		April 2013		

== See also ==
- Lists of United States state insignia
