= 2026 Idaho Official State Gun Question =

Non-binding referendum to choose official state gun

- November 3, 2026
- Which of the following guns should be designated as the state gun of Idaho? Please choose only one answer. (a) Winchester Model 1894 (.30-30); (b) Winchester Model 1873 "Gun that Won the West" (.44-40); (c) 1873 Colt Single Action Army Revolver "Peacemaker" (.45 Colt); (d) M1 Garand rifle (.30-06); (e) Colt M1911 .45 automatic Colt pistol (.45 ACP); or (f) Remington Model 700 bolt-action rifle (.30-06)

Results
Choice	Votes	%
Winchester Model 1873 "Gun that Won the West" (.44-40)	164,394	31.10%
Winchester Model 1894 (.30-30)	133,859	25.32%
All others	230,422	43.58%
Precinct results
Winchester 1873
50–60%
40–50%
30–40%
20–30%
Winchester 1894
90–100%
60–70%
50–60%
40–50%
30–40%
20–30%
Colt Peacemaker
20–30%
Remington 700
90–100%
20–30%
Other
Tie
No votes

The 2026 Idaho Official State Gun Question is a legislatively referred advisory question that was decided alongside the November 2026 elections in the US state of Idaho. Idaho voters decided between six guns which they would prefer to be the official state gun in the non-binding referendum.

== Background ==
As of 2026, ten U.S. states have an official state gun.

=== Legislation for question ===
On March 18, 2026, State Representative Jason Monks introduced House Bill 932, the bill containing the advisory question. Monks said the intention behind it was tied to the 250th anniversary of the United States' independence. The bill received 68 votes in favor in the state house with 2 not voting, and 32 votes in favor in the state senate, with 3 not voting. On April 2, Governor Brad Little signed the bill into law, placing the advisory question on the ballot.

== Weapons ==
The resolution that placed the question on the ballot gave the Idaho Legislative Council the ability to add more guns to the list than the six included in it, but none was added before ballots were sent out. The six weapons voters chose between in the non-binding referendum were the following:

- Winchester Model 1894 (.30-30)
- Winchester Model 1873 (.44-40)
- 1873 Colt Single Action Army Revolver (.45 Colt)
- M1 Garand rifle (.30-06)
- Colt M1911 .45 automatic Colt pistol (.45 ACP)
- Remington Model 700 bolt-action rifle (.30-06)

== Endorsements ==
Winchester Model 1873

Statewide officials

- Raúl Labrador, attorney general of Idaho (2023–present) (Republican)
- Theodore Wold, former solicitor general of Idaho (2022–2023) (Republican)
Colt M1911

Organizations

- Southern Idaho Democratic Socialists of America
1873 Colt Single Action Army Revolver

Organizations

- North Idaho Republicans PAC

== Reception ==
A satirical yard sign promoting a Super Soaker water gun to be Idaho's official state gun.

In an opinion article, Scott McIntosh of the Idaho Statesman agreed with the premise that Idaho should have an official state gun, but felt that the measure "could be an online poll" and agreed with Democratic state Representative Monica Church that it would add more pages to everyone's ballot, possibly making ballots "long and onerous".
