= Virginius =

Virginius may refer to:

- Virginius Affair, a diplomatic dispute that occurred during the Ten Years' War
  - Virginius, the ship at the center of the Affair
- Virginius Island, West Virginia, an island on the Shenandoah River in Harpers Ferry, West Virginia

== People ==
- Alan Virginius (born 2003), French footballer
- Any of various members of the Roman gens Verginia, also spelled Virginia
- Virginius E. Clark (1886–1948), American aviator and military officer
- Virginius Dabney (1901–1995), American educator and writer
- Virginius Dabney (American football) (1878–1942), football player and coach

== Literature ==
- Virginius (play), an 1820 tragedy by James Sheridan Knowles
- A character in The Physician's Tale, one of the Canterbury Tales of Geoffrey Chaucer, written in the 14th century
- Lucius Verginius, a respected Roman centurion and father of heroine Verginia in Livy's Ab Urbe Condita

== See also ==
- Virginia (given name), a feminine name derived from the Roman gens
