= Harpers Ferry, West Virginia =

- Town
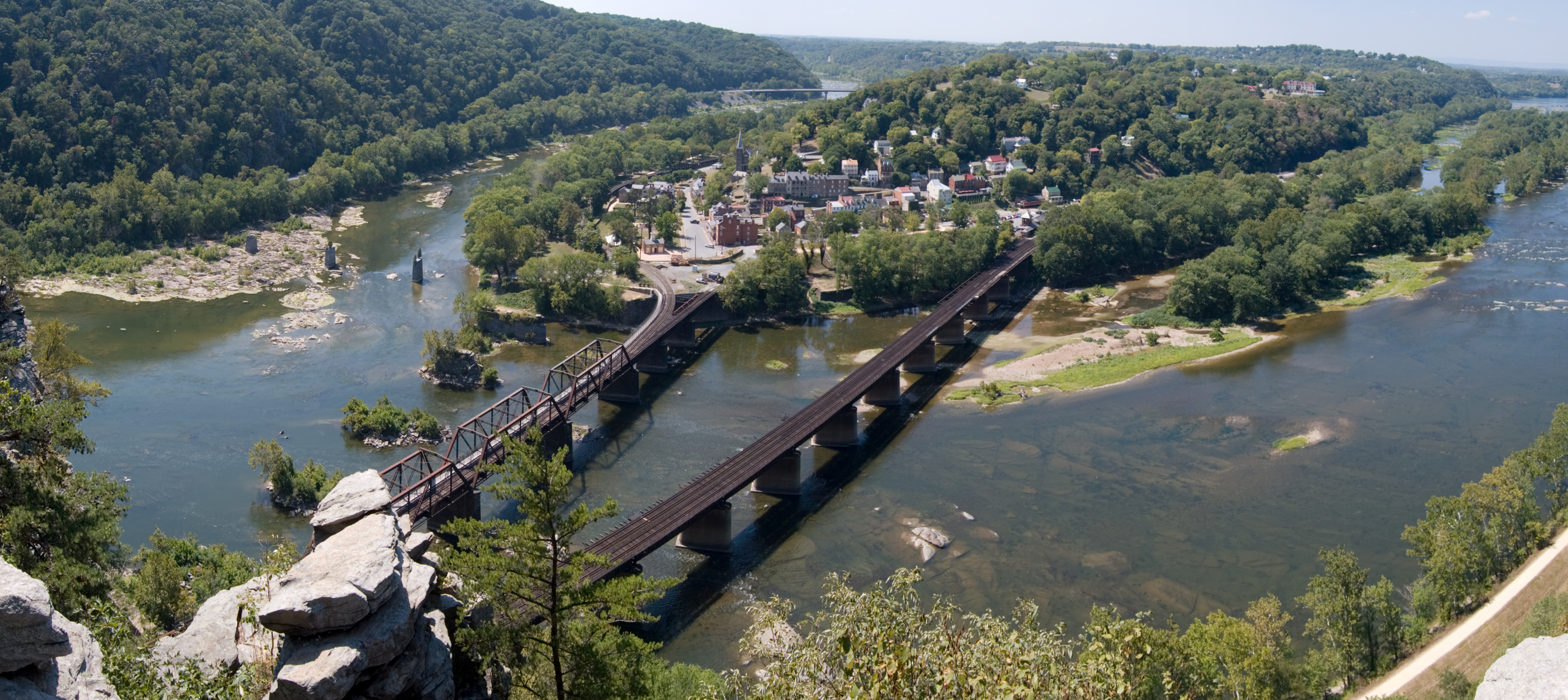
- Aerial view of Harpers Ferry from Maryland Heights at the confluence of the Shenandoah (left) and Potomac Rivers

- Seal

- Location of Harpers Ferry in Jefferson County, West Virginia

- Location within Eastern Panhandle of West Virginia Location within West Virginia Location within the United States
- Coordinates: 39°19′40″N 77°44′47″W
- Country: United States
- State: West Virginia
- County: Jefferson
- Established: 1763
- Incorporated: 1872

Government
  - Type: Mayor-Council
  - Mayor: Gregory Vaughn (I)

Area
  - Total: 0.63 sq mi (1.62 km^{2})
  - Land: 0.54 sq mi (1.39 km^{2})
  - Water: 0.089 sq mi (0.23 km^{2})
- Elevation: 509 ft (155 m)

Population (2020)
  - Total: 269
  - Density: 526.9/sq mi (203.45/km^{2})
- Time zone: UTC-5 (Eastern (EST))
  - Summer (DST): UTC-4 (EDT)
- ZIP Code: 25425
- Area code: 304
- FIPS code: 54-35284
- GNIS feature ID: 2390232
- Website: www.harpersferrywv.us

Harpers Ferry is a historic town in Jefferson County, West Virginia, United States. The population was 269 at the 2020 United States census. Situated at the confluence of the Potomac and Shenandoah Rivers in the lower Shenandoah Valley, where Maryland, Virginia, and West Virginia meet, it is the easternmost town in West Virginia as well as its lowest point above sea level.

Originally named Harper's Ferry after an 18th-century ferry owner, the town lost its apostrophe in 1891 in an update by the United States Board on Geographic Names. It gained fame in 1859 when abolitionist John Brown led a raid on the Harpers Ferry Armory in a doomed effort to start a slave rebellion in Virginia and across the South. During the American Civil War, the town became the northernmost point of Confederate-controlled territory, and changed hands several times due to its strategic importance.

An antebellum manufacturing and transportation hub, Harpers Ferry has long since reoriented its economy around tourism after being largely destroyed during the Civil War. Harpers Ferry is home to John Brown's Fort (West Virginia's most visited tourist site), the headquarters of the Appalachian Trail, whose midpoint is nearby, the former campus of Storer College (a historically black college established during Reconstruction), and one of four national training centers of the National Park Service.

Much of the lower town, which was in ruins by the end of the Civil War and ravaged by subsequent floods, has been rebuilt and preserved by the National Park Service.

== History ==
=== 1700s ===
In 1733, squatter Peter Stephens settled on land near the confluence of the Potomac and Shenandoah Rivers and established a ferry across the Potomac from Virginia (now West Virginia) to Maryland.

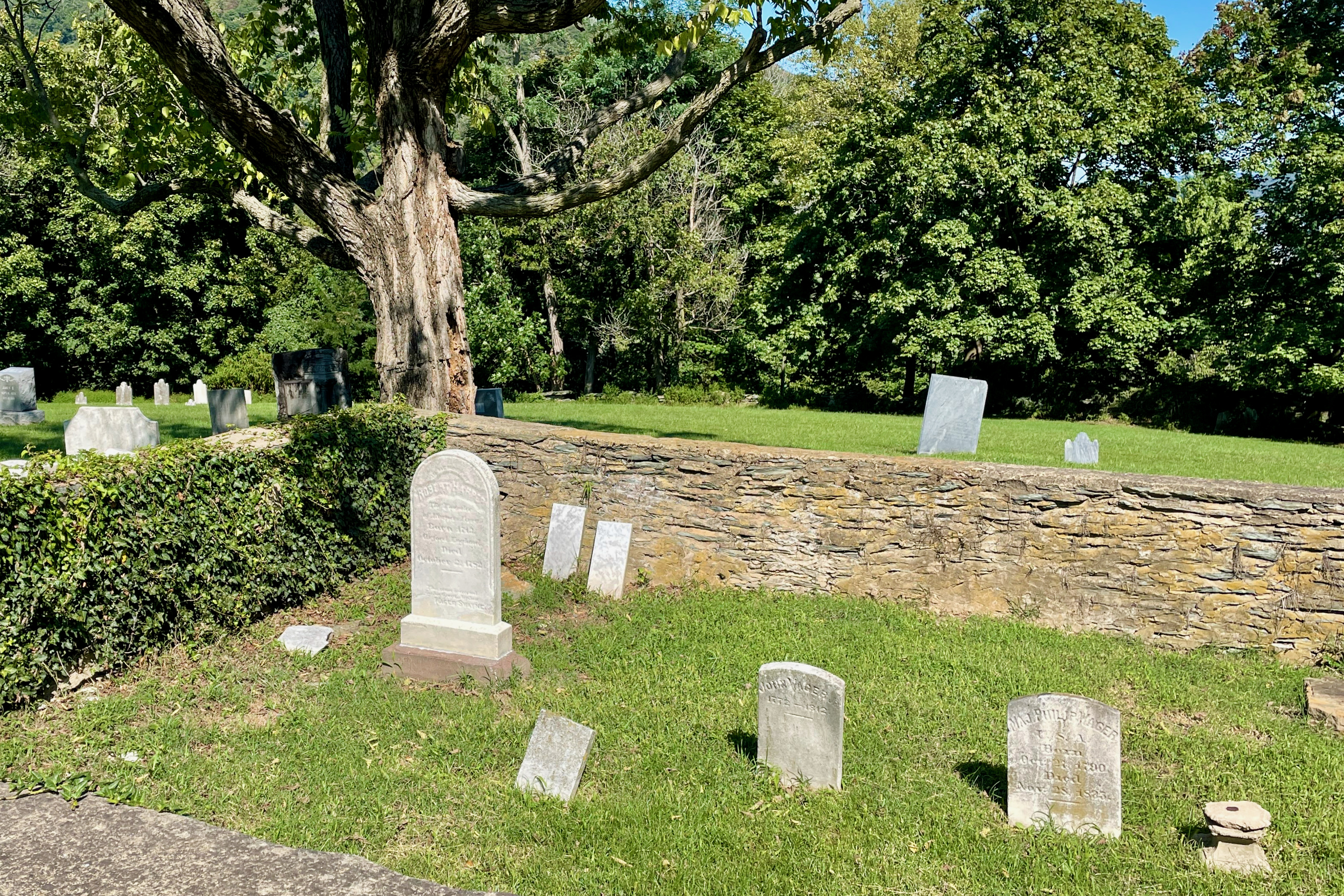
Gravesite of Robert Harper from whom the town takes its name

Robert Harper, from whom the town takes its name, was born in 1718 in Oxford Township, Pennsylvania, now part of Philadelphia. Since he was a builder, Harper was asked by a group of Quakers in 1747 to build a meeting house in the Shenandoah Valley near the present site of Winchester, Virginia. Traveling through Maryland on his way to the Shenandoah Valley, Harper—who was also a millwright—realized the potential of the latent waterpower from the Shenandoah and Potomac Rivers at their confluence. He paid Stephens 30 guineas for his squatting rights to the ferry, since the land actually belonged to Lord Fairfax.

Harper then purchased 126 acres (0.51 km^{2}) of land from Lord Fairfax in 1751. In 1761, the Virginia General Assembly granted him the right to establish and maintain a ferry across the Potomac. In 1763, the Virginia General Assembly established the town of "Shenandoah Falls at Mr. Harpers Ferry." Harper died in October 1782, and is buried in the Harper Cemetery.

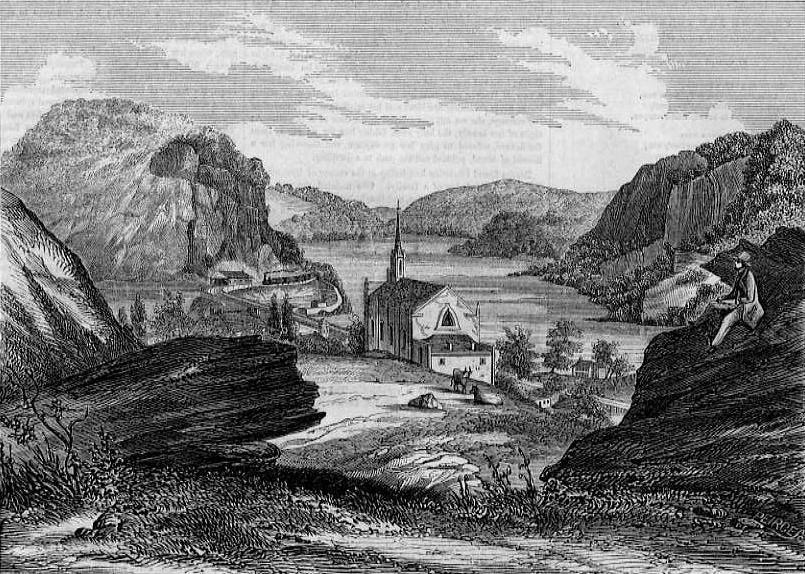
View of Harpers Ferry from Jefferson Rock in 1854

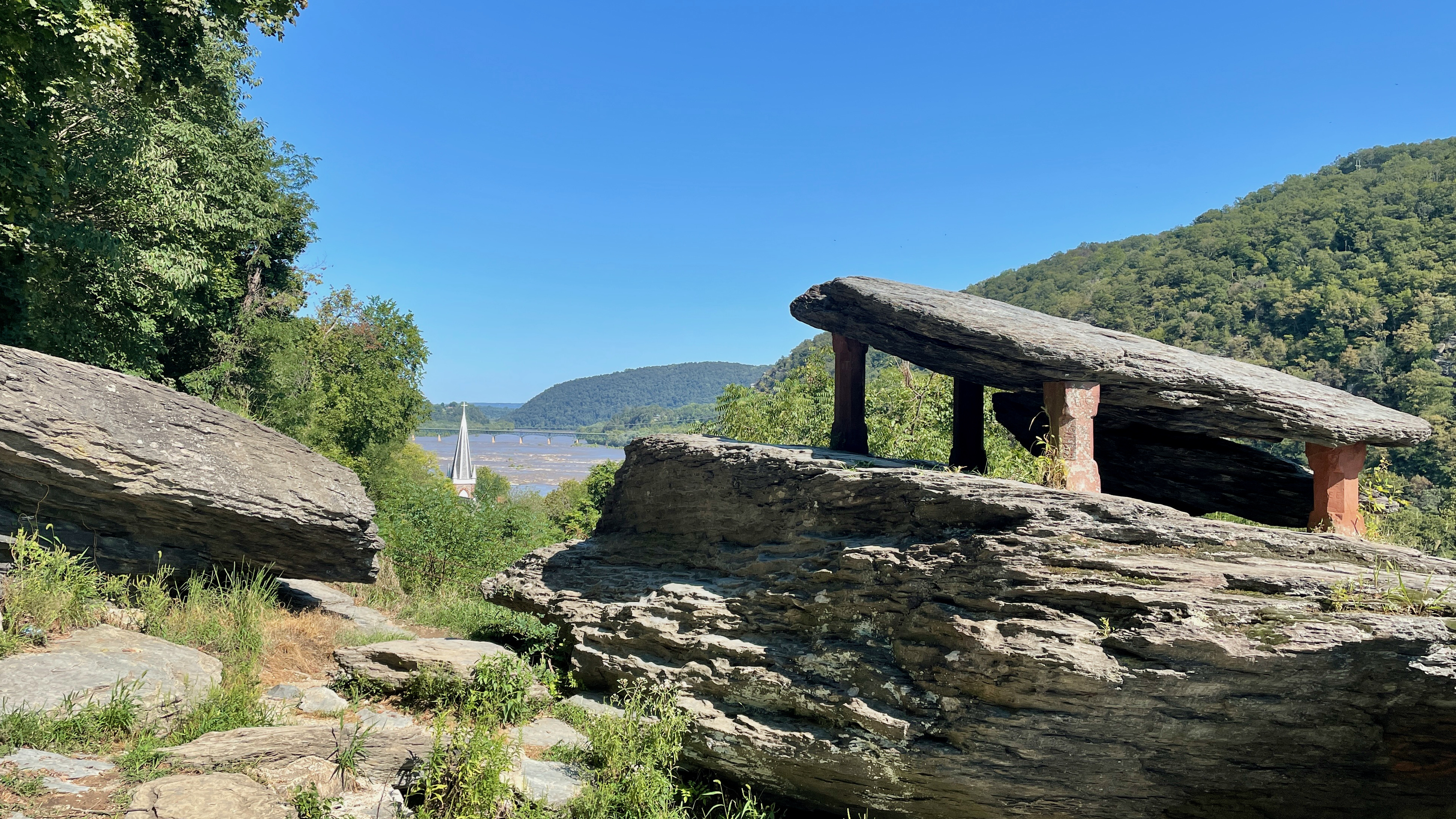
The same view in 2021

On October 25, 1783, Thomas Jefferson visited Harpers Ferry as he was traveling to Philadelphia. Viewing "the passage of the Potomac through the Blue Ridge" from a rock that is now named for him as Jefferson's Rock, he called the site "perhaps one of the most stupendous scenes in nature" and stated, "This scene is worth a voyage across the Atlantic." The town was one of his favorite retreats, and tradition holds that much of his Notes on the State of Virginia was written there. Jefferson County, in which Harpers Ferry is located, was named for him on its creation in 1801.

George Washington, as president of the Potomac Company (which was formed to complete river improvements on the Potomac River and its tributaries), traveled to Harpers Ferry during summer 1785 to determine the need for bypass canals. Washington's familiarity with the area led him to propose the site in 1794 for a new armory. His brother, Charles Washington, who founded nearby Charles Town, and his great-great-nephew, Colonel Lewis Washington, both moved to the area.

=== 1800s ===
==== The federal armory ====
In 1796, the federal government purchased a 125-acre (0.5 km^{2}) parcel of land from the heirs of Robert Harper. Construction began on what would become the United States Armory and Arsenal at Harpers Ferry in 1799. It is referred to locally as both "the armory" and "the arsenal," but it is the same facility. This was the second of only two such facilities in the United States, the first being in Springfield, Massachusetts. Together they produced most of the small arms for the U.S. Army. The town was transformed into a water-powered industrial center. Between 1801 and 1861, when the armory was destroyed to prevent capture during the American Civil War, it produced more than 600,000 muskets, rifles, and pistols. Inventor Captain John H. Hall pioneered the use of interchangeable parts in firearms manufactured at his rifle works at the armory between 1820 and 1840. His M1819 Hall rifle was the first breech-loading weapon adopted by the U.S. Army.

==== Canals ====
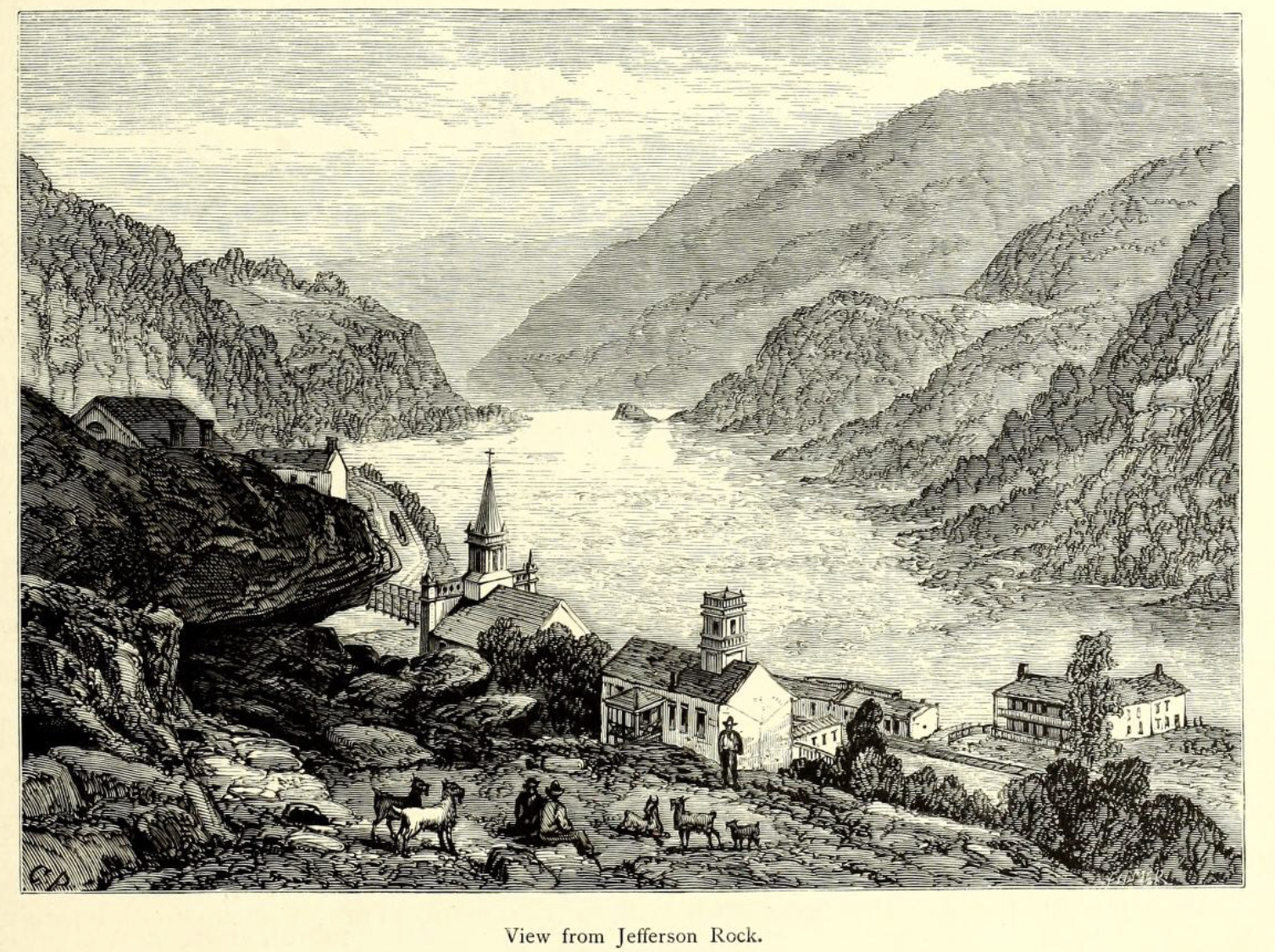
The Potomac Canal at Harper's Ferry

Harpers Ferry's first man-made transportation facility was the Potomac Canal. The canal ceased transportation in 1828, but a portion of it in front of the town channeled river water to run machinery for the armory.

The Potomac Canal ran on the Virginia side of the river. On the Maryland side, the later Chesapeake and Ohio Canal and the Baltimore and Ohio Railroad competed for right-of-way on a very narrow patch of land downstream from Harpers Ferry.

==== Arrival of railroads ====
In 1833, the Chesapeake & Ohio Canal reached Harpers Ferry from Washington, D.C.; a planned western expansion to Ohio was never completed. A year later, the Baltimore and Ohio Railroad began service from Harpers Ferry via Wager Bridge, named for a family that later built the town's Wager Hotel. The bridge connected the town across the Potomac with Sandy Hook, Maryland, which for a few years in the 1830s was the railroad's western terminus. In 1837, the railroad crossed the Potomac into Harpers Ferry with the opening of the B & O Railroad Potomac River Crossing.

The first railroad junction in the country began service in 1836 when the Winchester and Potomac Railroad opened its line from Harpers Ferry southwest to Charles Town and then to Winchester, Virginia.

==== Virginius Island ====
Virginius Island, which connected the Shenandoah River to the lower part of Harpers Ferry, was created by happenstance in the early 1800s after debris floated down from upstream mills during the construction of the Shenandoah Canal. Cotton, flour mills, and other water-powered companies were developed on Virginius Island, taking advantage of the Shenandoah River's water power and good routes to markets. The island came to house all of Harpers Ferry's manufacturing, except for the armory, which used the Potomac River for power, and its rifle plant, some distance upstream using the Shenandoah's power.

At its antebellum peak, some 180 people lived on Virginius Island, including workers who lived in a boarding house and in row houses. Floods in the 20th century destroyed all structures on the island. Today, visitors can view Virginius Island's historic ruins and walk National Park Service trails.

==== John Brown's raid ====
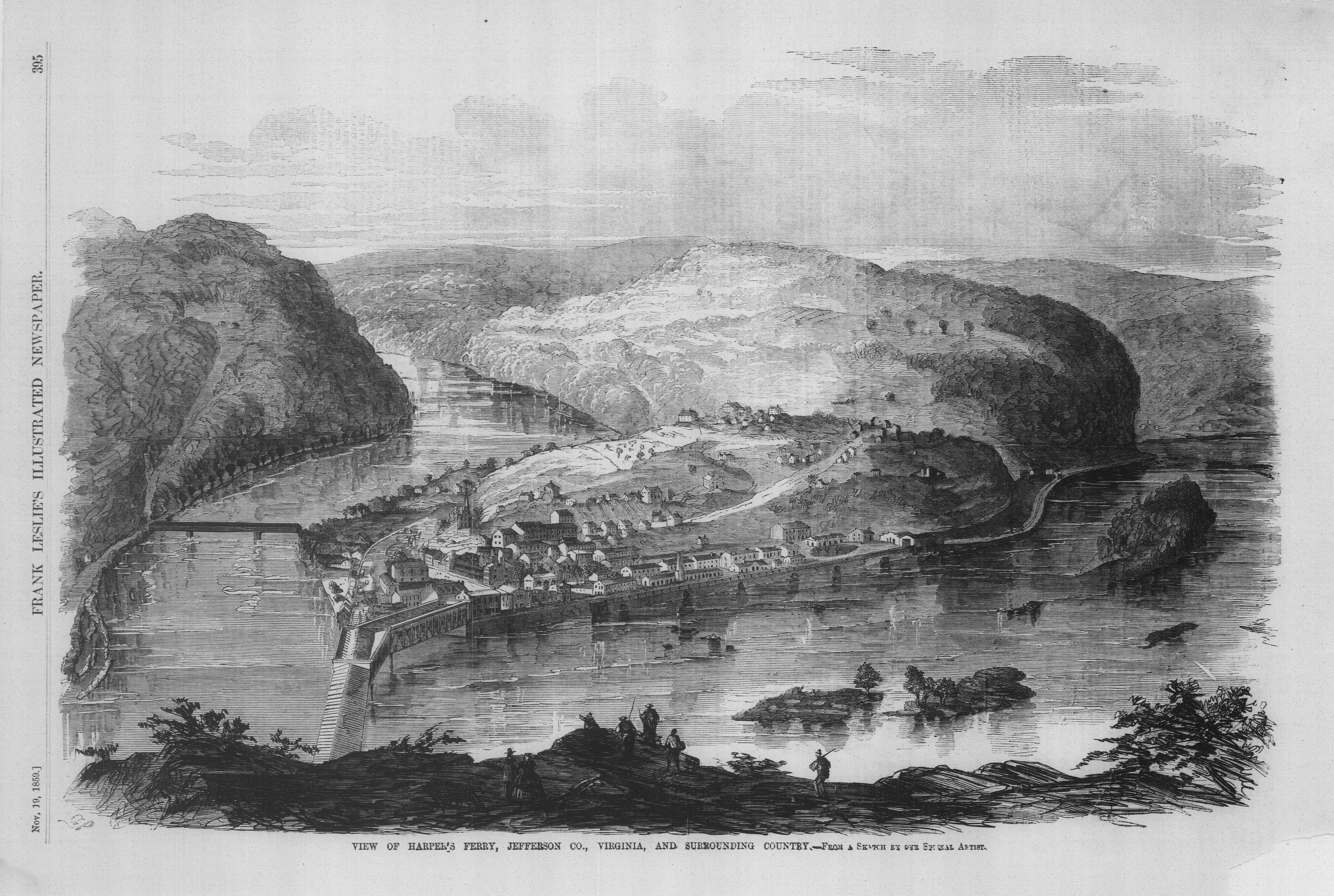
Harper's Ferry in 1859

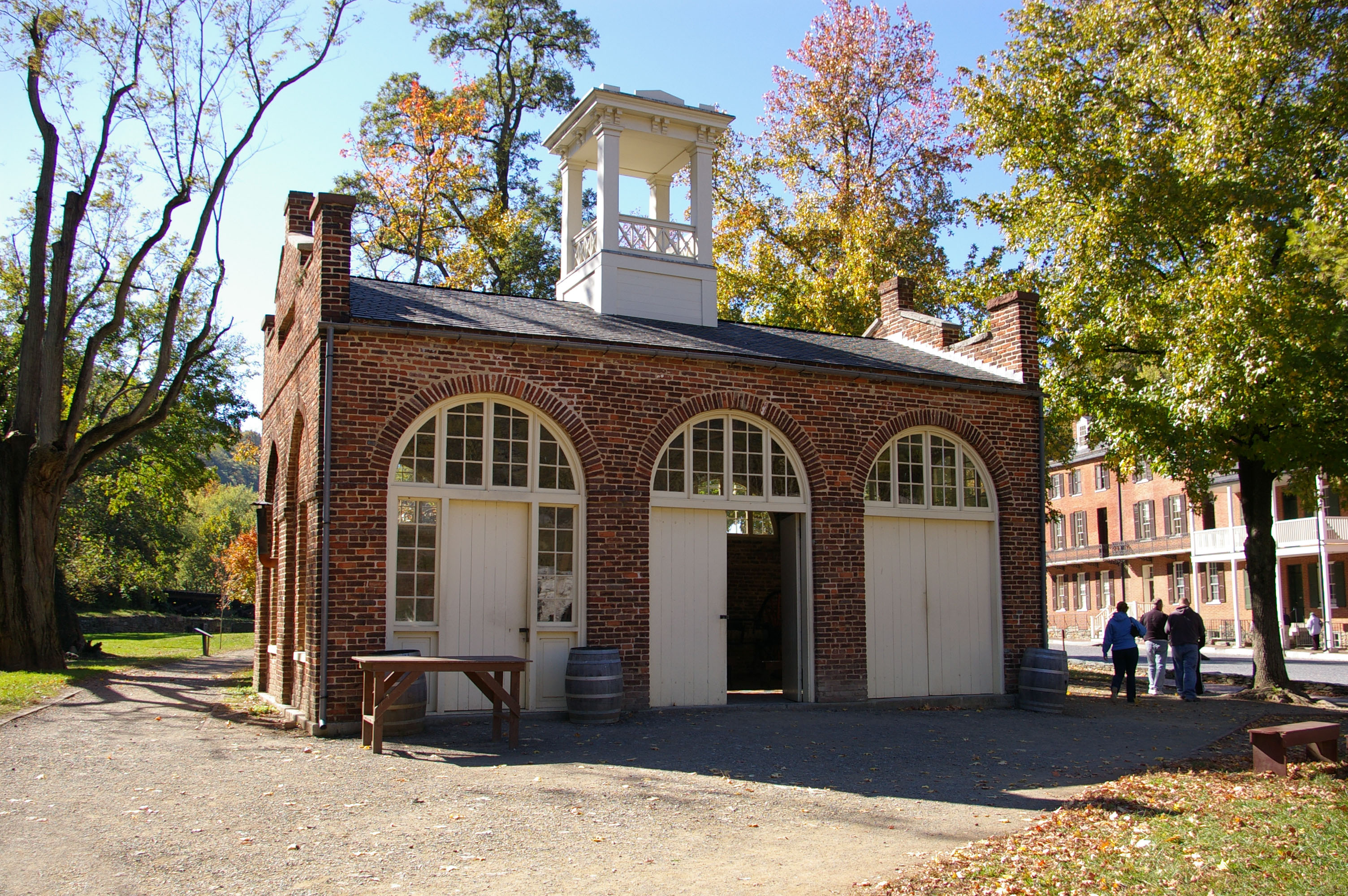
Preserved John Brown's Fort (the engine house) in 2007

On October 16, 1859, the abolitionist John Brown led a group of 22 men (counting himself) in a raid on the armory. Five of the men were black: three free black men, one freed slave, and one fugitive slave. Brown attacked and captured several buildings, hoping to secure the weapons depot and arm the slaves, starting a revolt across the South. Brown also brought 1,000 steel pikes, which were forged in Connecticut by a blacksmith and abolitionist sympathizer, Charles Blair; however, the pikes, a weapon that does not require training, were never used as Brown failed to rally the slaves to revolt. The first shot of the raid mortally wounded Heyward Shepherd, a free black man who was a baggage porter for the Baltimore and Ohio Railroad.

The noise from that shot alerted Dr. John Starry shortly after 1 am. He walked from his nearby home to investigate the shooting and was confronted by Brown's men. Starry stated that he was a doctor but could do nothing more for Shepherd, and the men allowed him to leave. Starry then went to the livery and rode to neighboring towns and villages, alerting residents to the raid. John Brown's men were quickly pinned down by shots fired by local citizens and militia, and forced to take refuge in the fire engine house (later called John Brown's Fort), at the entrance to the armory. The stout building served as their redoubt for more than two days.

The Secretary of War asked the Navy Department for a unit of United States Marines from the Washington Navy Yard, the nearest troops. Lieutenant Israel Greene was ordered to take a force of 86 Marines to the town. U.S. Army Lieutenant Colonel Robert E. Lee was found on leave at his home not far away in Arlington, Virginia, and was assigned as commander, along with Lt. J. E. B. Stuart as his aide-de-camp. Lee led the unit in civilian clothes, as none of his uniforms were available. The contingent arrived by train on October 18, and began negotiations of the abolitionists' surrender.

When negotiation failed to produce a result, the troops stormed the fire house and ended the siege. In the action, the troops killed a few abolitionists and suffered a single casualty (twenty-four-year-old Marine Private Luke Quinn). John Brown and the other surviving raiders were captured. Lee submitted a report on October 19.

Brown was quickly tried in Charles Town, the county seat of Jefferson County, for treason against the Commonwealth of Virginia, murder, and fomenting a slave insurrection. Convicted of all charges, with Starry's testimony integral to the conviction, he was hanged on December 2. (See Virginia v. John Brown.)

John Brown's words, both from his interview by Virginia Governor Henry A. Wise and his famous last speech, "captured the attention of the nation like no other abolitionist or slave owner before or since."

==== American Civil War ====
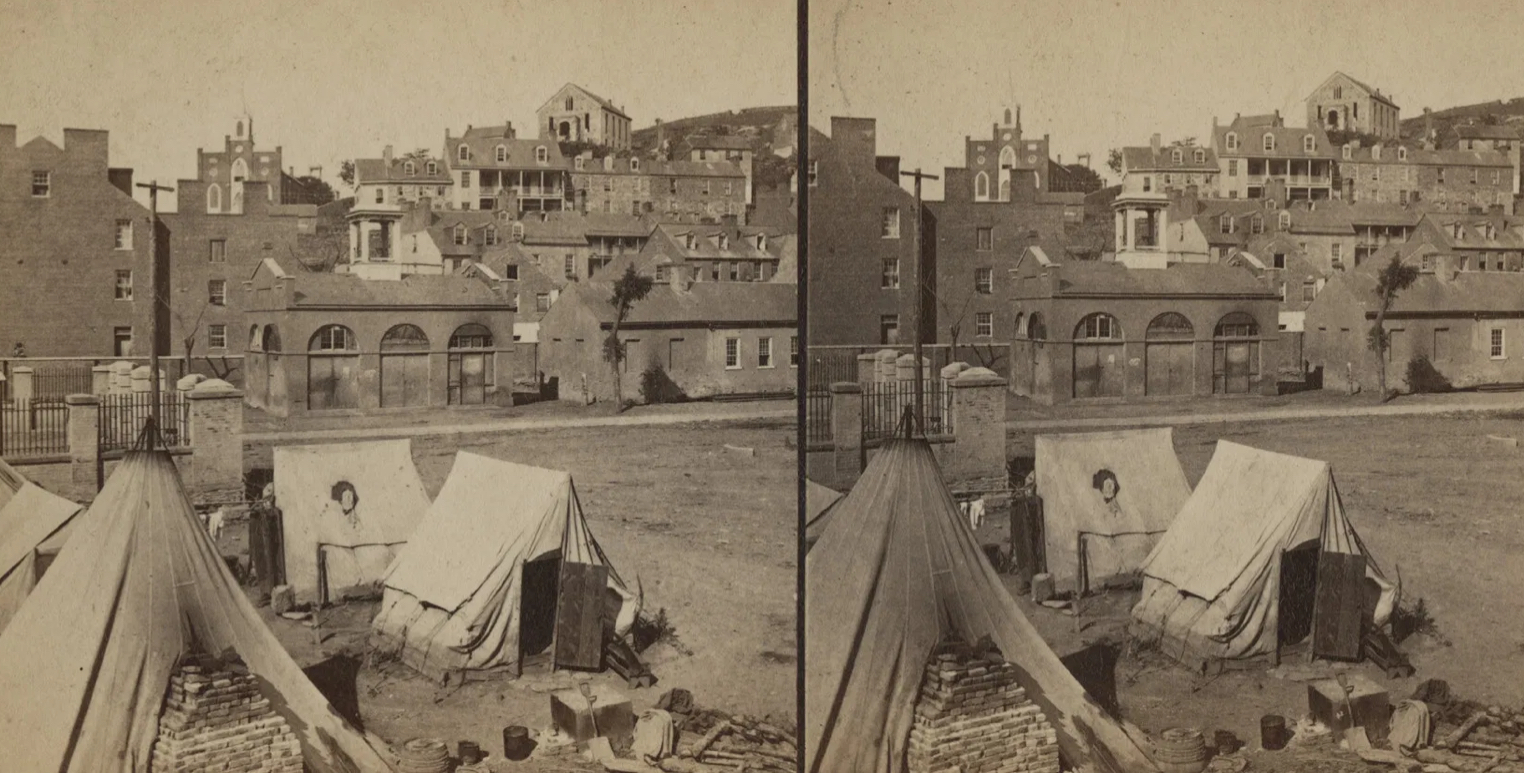
Stereoscopic picture of contraband camp at Harpers Ferry, about 1861, with John Brown's Fort in background

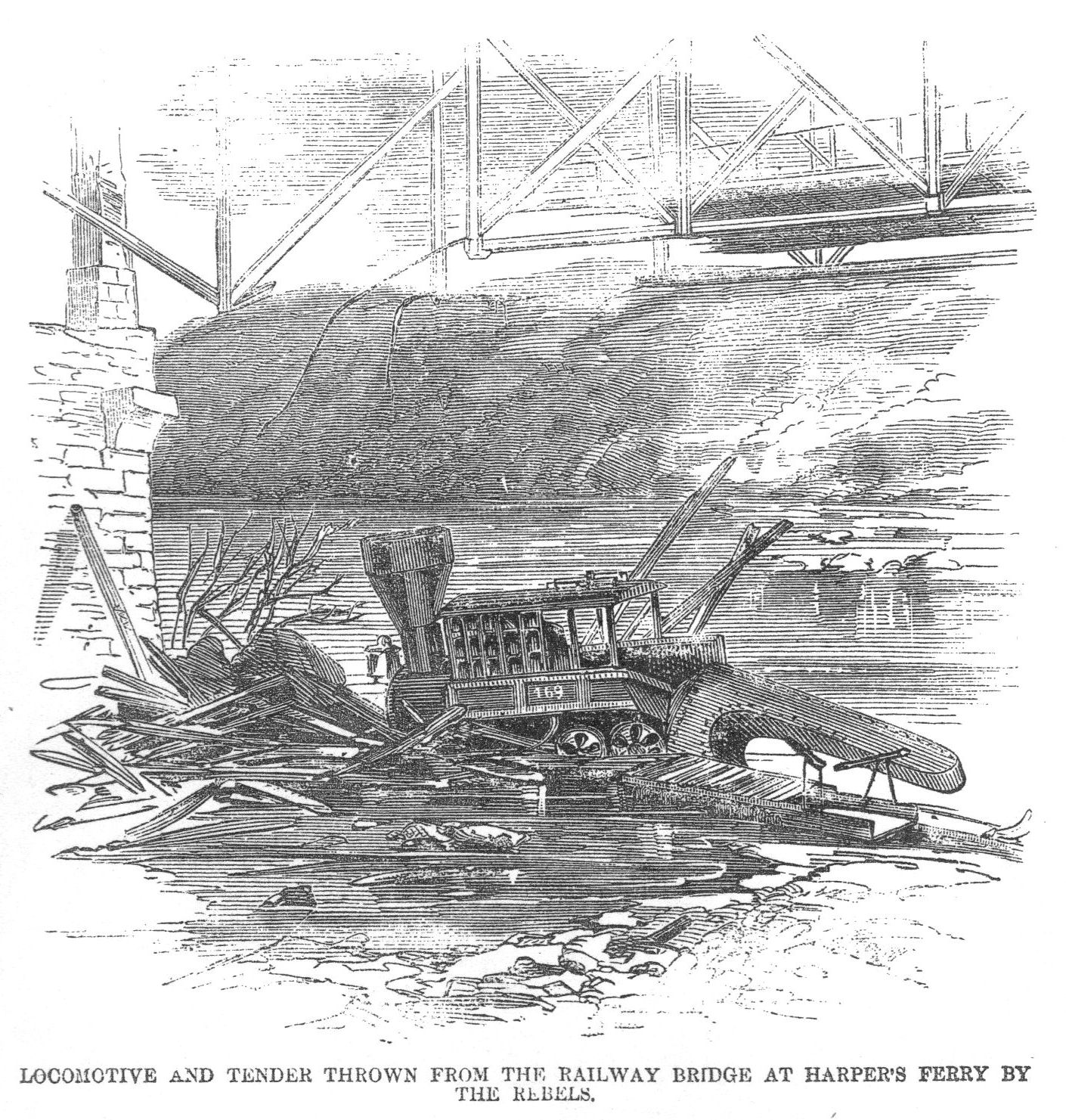
July 20, 1861 Harper's Weekly news illustration with camel back locomotive and tender wrecked by rebels in Harpers Ferry

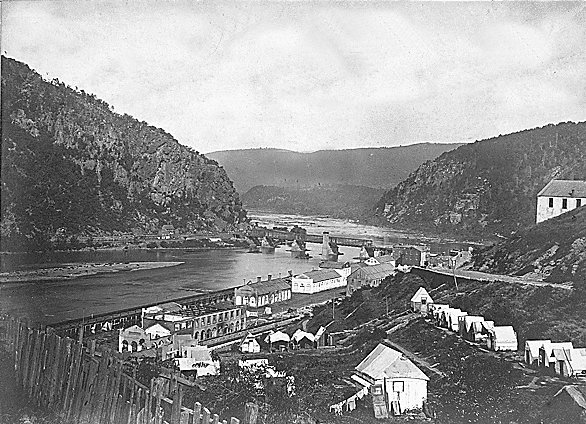
Harpers Ferry in 1865, looking east (downstream); the ruins of the musket factory can be seen in the center.

The American Civil War was disastrous for Harpers Ferry, where five battles took place; it changed hands eight times between 1861 and 1865. (Another article says it changed hands twelve times.) One of the first military actions by secessionists in Virginia was taken on April 18, 1861, when they wrested control of the Federal arsenal at Harpers Ferry from the Union Army, even before the convention which would consider whether or not the state should secede had been called together.

Because of the town's strategic location on the Baltimore and Ohio Railroad and at the northern end of the Shenandoah Valley, both Union and Confederate troops moved through Harpers Ferry frequently. It was said that "Jefferson County is where the North and South met." It was a natural conduit for Confederate invasions of the North, as in General Robert E. Lee's Maryland campaign of 1862 and Gettysburg campaign of 1863, and for Union troops heading south in their attempts to thwart Rebel forces in the Valley.

The town was "easy to seize, and hard to hold", because of its topography: surrounded on three sides by high ground (Bolivar Heights to the west, Loudoun Heights to the south, and Maryland Heights to the east) and the Potomac and Shenandoah Rivers, anyone who controlled the heights controlled the city.

The war's effect on the town was devastating. It was described in March 1862:

Harper's Ferry presents quite a gloomy picture. The best buildings have been shelled to the ground, and nothing now remains but their foundations to mark the spot where they once stood. The old Arsenal has been burnt to the ground; that part of the building where old John Brown made such a fatal stand, still stands as a monument to his memory. Before the destruction of the town, it contained near 3000 inhabitants, but at the present time there are not more than 300 or 400 families there.

In the account of Joseph George Rosengarten, Harpers Ferry and nearby Bolivar, in 1859 "a blooming garden-spot, full of thrift and industry and comfort," had been reduced to "waste and desolation" by 1862.

The town's garrison of federal troops attracted 1,500 contrabands by the summer of 1862. They were returned to slavery, however, when Confederate General Stonewall Jackson took Harpers Ferry in September 1862. Lee needed to control Harpers Ferry because it was on his supply line and could cut off his possible routes of retreat if captured. Therefore, Lee divided his army of approximately 40,000 into four sections, sending three columns under Jackson to surround and capture the town.

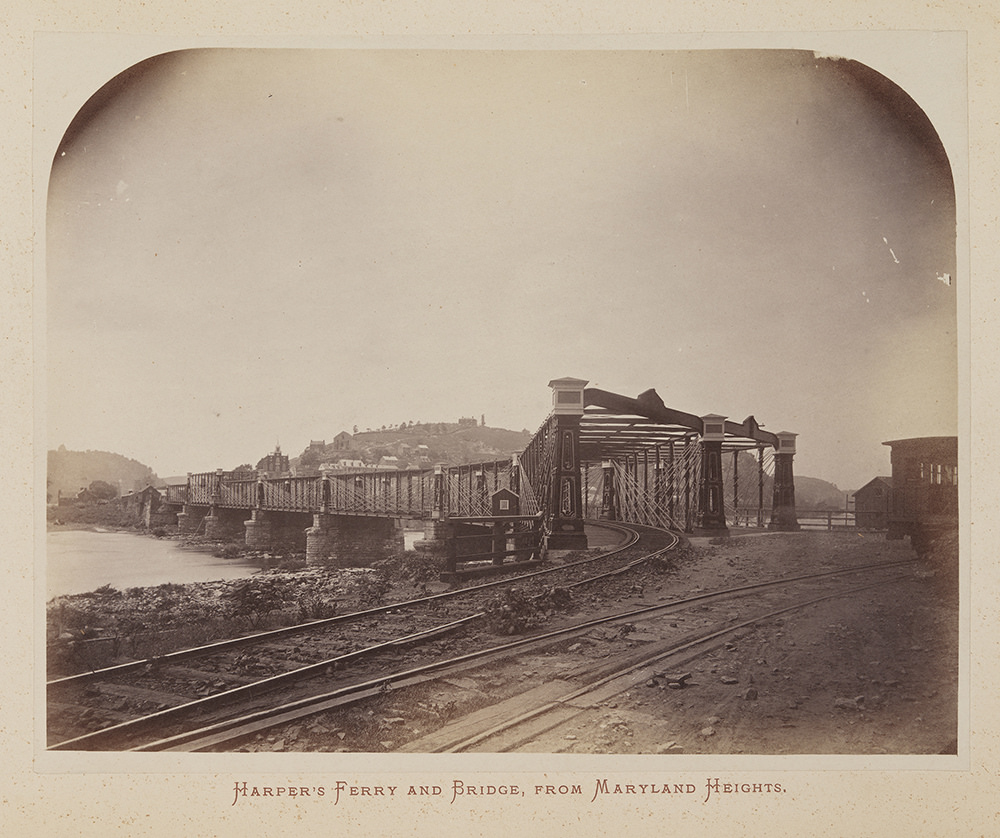
Harpers Ferry and bridge from Maryland Heights, 1872

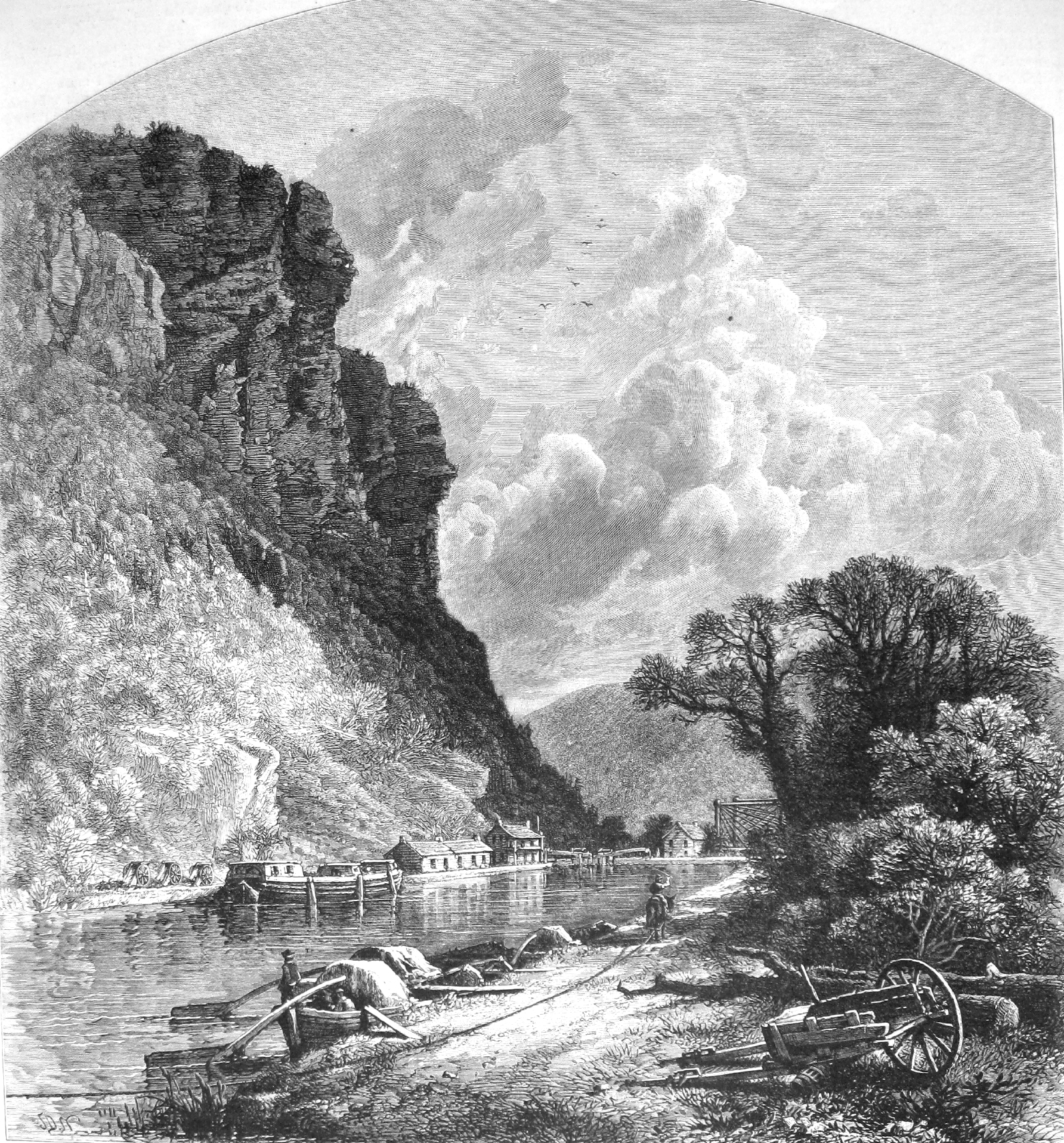
Maryland Heights, Harpers Ferry, 1873

The Battle of Harpers Ferry started with light fighting September 13 as the Confederates tried to capture the Maryland Heights to the northeast, while John Walker moved back over the Potomac to capture Loudoun Heights south of town. After a Confederate artillery bombardment on September 14 and 15, the federal garrison surrendered. With Jackson's capture of 12,419 federal troops, the surrender at Harpers Ferry was the largest surrender of U.S. military personnel until the Battle of Bataan in 1942.

Because of the delay in capturing the town and the movement of federal forces to the west, Lee was forced to regroup at the town of Sharpsburg, Maryland. Two days later he commanded troops in the Battle of Antietam, which had the highest number of deaths among troops of any single day in United States military history.

By July 1864, the Union again had control of Harpers Ferry. On July 4, 1864, Union general Franz Sigel withdrew his troops to Maryland Heights, from which he resisted Jubal Early's attempt to enter the town and drive out the federal garrison.

==== Post-Civil War ====
Inspired by John Brown's raid, both runaway and freed slaves came to Harpers Ferry during and after the American Civil War. This created social tensions between white and black residents of the community and generated a growing need for services for the increasing African-American population. Accordingly, a freedman's school was opened on Camp Hill by Freewill Baptist missionaries following the American Civil War.

The town and the armory, with the exception of John Brown's Fort, were destroyed during the war. "The larger portion of the houses all lie in ruins and the whole place is not actually worth $10," wrote a Massachusetts soldier to his mother in 1863. A visitor in 1878 found the town "antiquated, dingy, and rather squalid"; another, in 1879, described it as "shabby and ruined." Since the Arsenal, Harpers Ferry's largest employer before the war, was never rebuilt, the town's population never recovered to antebellum levels.

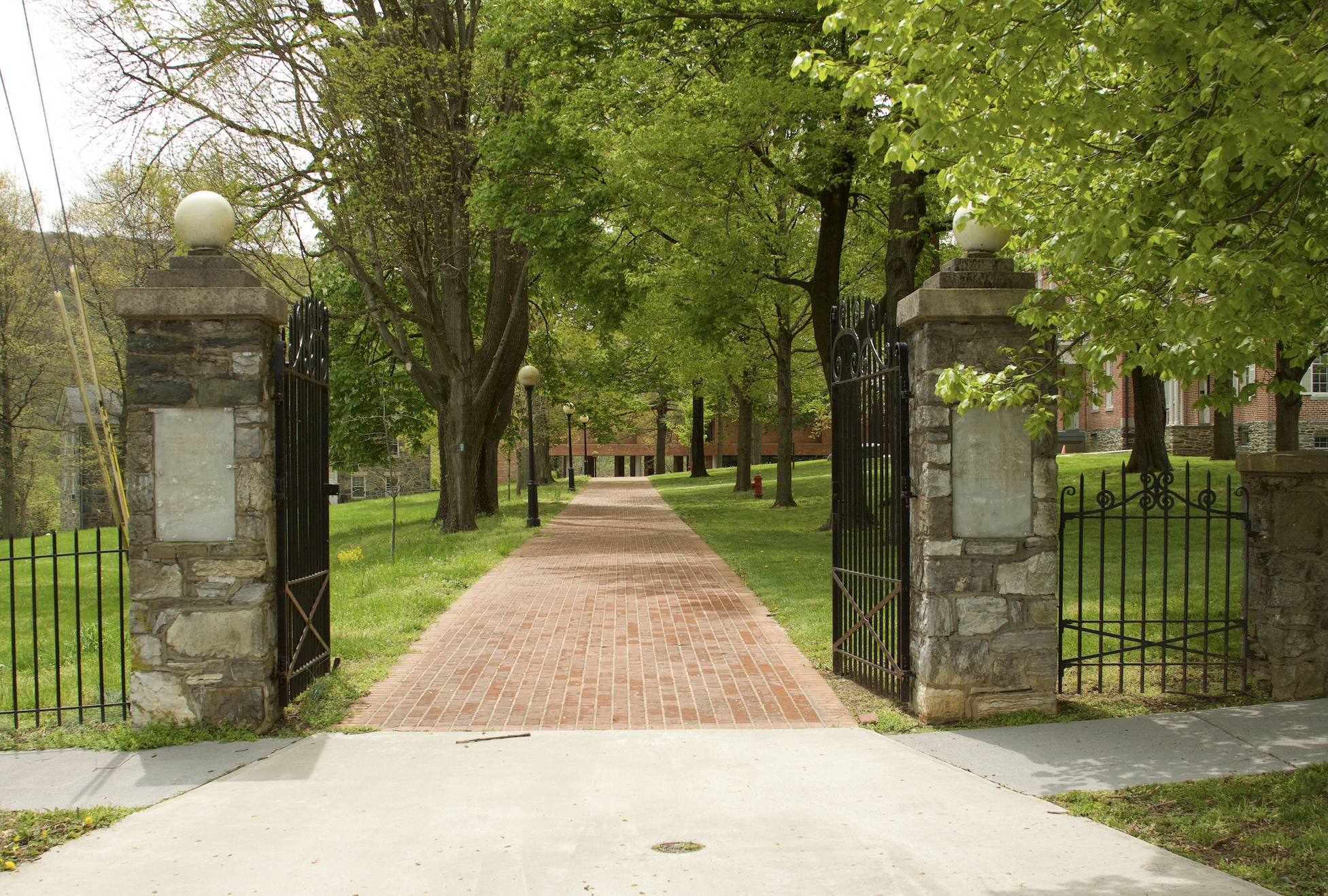
Soldiers' Gate at Storer College

==== Storer College ====
Storer College, devoted to training teachers for freedmen, opened in 1868, much to the displeasure of many residents of Harpers Ferry who petitioned the Legislature to revoke its charter. The War Department gave the Freedmen's Bureau its remaining assets in Harpers Ferry, principally four sturdy residences for the managers of the Armory, structurally sound but in need of repairs from damage during the war, and the Bureau gave them to Storer College. A one-room school for Blacks was already operating in one of them.

==== African-American tourism ====
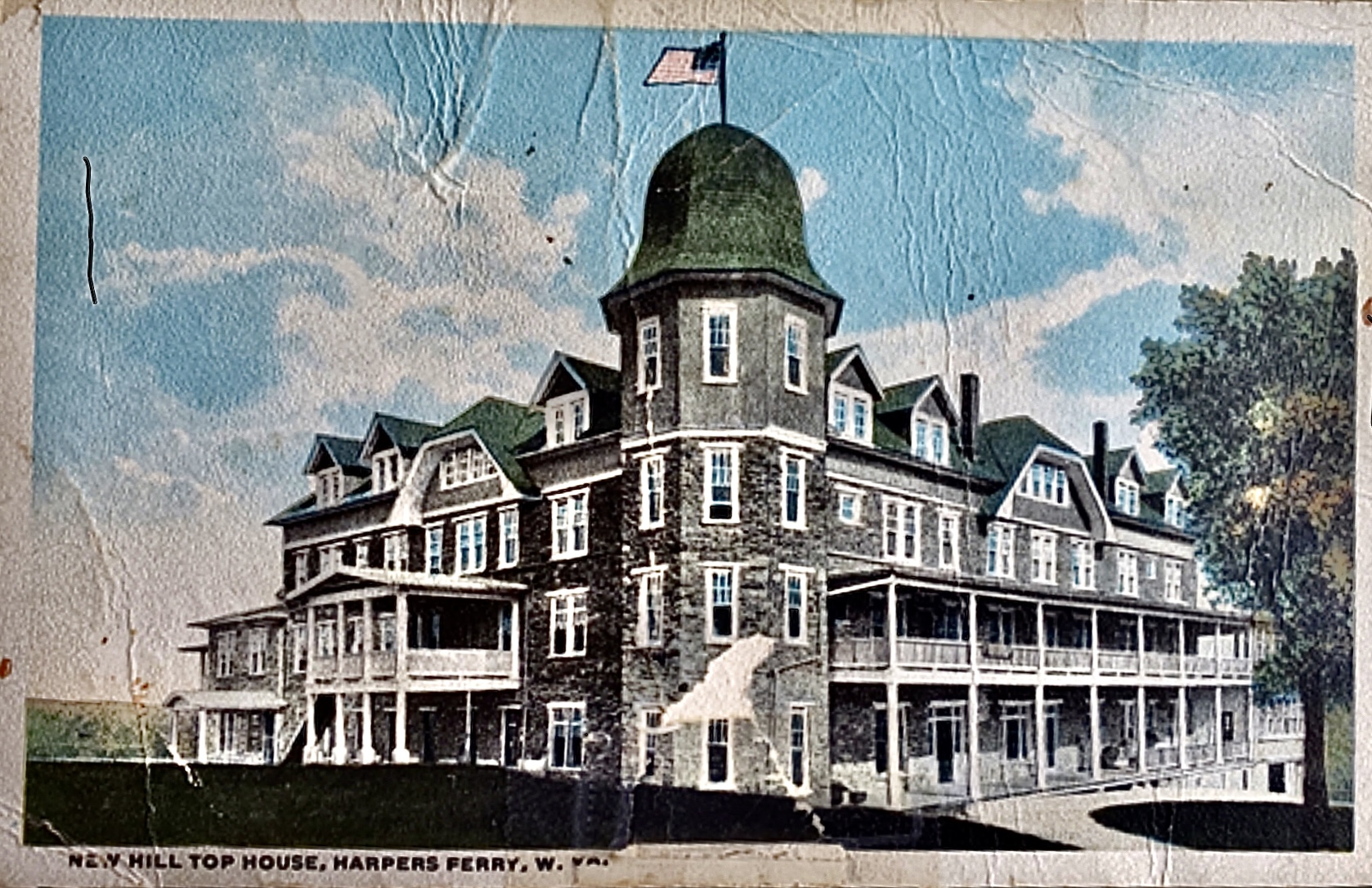
Hilltop House in Harpers Ferry, circa 1914

As early as 1878, the Baltimore and Ohio Railroad ran excursion trains to Harpers Ferry from Baltimore and Washington. As described in a newspaper in 1873: "One need only to alight from the train and look a little envious toward the old Engine House or the ruined walls of the old Arsenal in order to have a score of persons offering to become a kind of guide or to point out to your whatever you may desire to know about the great struggle which ended in the 'opening of the prison doors, the breaking of every yoke, the undoing of heavy burdens, and letting the oppressed go free."

Storer, the only Black college at a location historically important to African-Americans, became a center of the civil rights movement and built the town's importance as a destination for Black tourists and excursionists. Douglass spoke there in 1881, as part of an unsuccessful campaign to fund a "John Brown professorship" to be held by an African-American. In 1906, Storer hosted the first U.S. meeting of the Niagara Movement, the predecessor of the NAACP, after its organizational meeting in Fort Erie, Ontario.

In the late 1890s, the Baltimore and Ohio Railroad wanted the land where the fort was located to make its line less vulnerable to flooding. Some white townspeople were eager to get rid of the fort. It was dismantled and moved to Chicago for display at the 1893 Columbian Exposition. Abandoned there, it was rescued and moved back to Harpers Ferry by the Baltimore and Ohio without charge, motivated by their expectation that having the fort back in Harpers Ferry would be a tourist attraction and a way to build ridership on the railroad. But most whites were opposed to any commemoration of John Brown, and it was placed on a nearby farm.

Visits by tourists, many of them Black, now began to slowly turn the town into a real tourist center and return it to growth. "Harpers Ferry proved to be one of the most visited places of leisure for nineteenth-century African Americans." There was a Black-owned hotel, the Hill Top House, built and run by a Storer graduate, Thomas Lovett, but it catered only to white clientele. In the summer Storer rented rooms to Black vacationers until 1896. The fort was the great monument where the end of slavery began. There were so many tourists that they were a nuisance to the farmer on whose lands the fort sat, and so it was moved to Storer in 1909. There it would remain until several years after the college closed in 1955, functioning as the College Museum. Male students practiced their public-speaking skills by giving tours of it.

==== Island Park Resort and Amusement Park ====
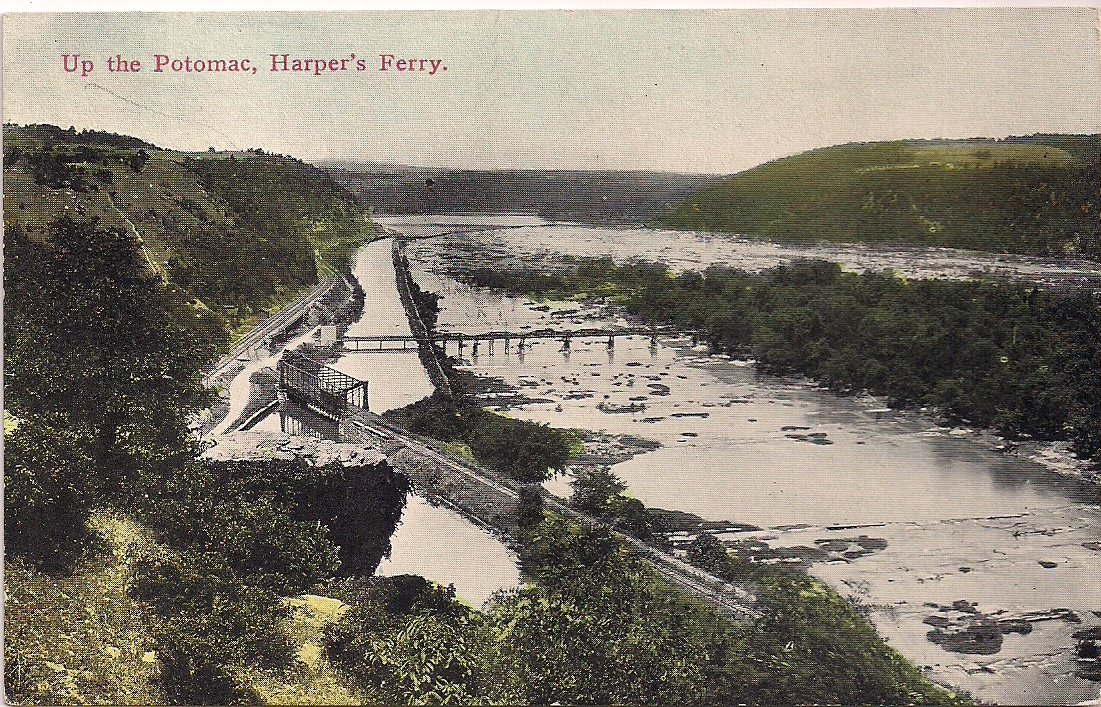
Footbridge over the Potomac Canal and part of the Potomac River to Island Park, a recreation area built by the Baltimore and Ohio Railroad on Byrne Island in Harpers Ferry

To increase ridership, the B&O in 1879 built Island Park Resort and Amusement Park on Byrne Island in the Potomac, which the railroad bought and built a footbridge to reach it. One had to pay 5¢ ($5 in 2021 value) to cross and enter, after which rides and other activities were free. Access to the park was also a benefit for B&O employees, as it had done in Relay, Maryland. Among the many events held there were a reunion of 4,000 Odd Fellows in 1880 and a "Grand Tri-State Democratic Mass Meeting" 1892.

Thomas Wentworth Higginson, one of the Secret Six who assisted John Brown, chose Harpers Ferry for his honeymoon.

The park was large enough that parades could be held. There were a steam-powered ferris wheel and carousel, a midway, a pavilion for dancing or roller skating, swings, a merry-go-round, and a bandstand. Visitors could also play croquet, tennis, rent boats, fish, or wade in the river. Later there were baseball games. Blacks and whites attended on different days. In 1883, there were an estimated 100,000 visitors. There were six special trains to Harpers Ferry from various points.

The amusement park was kept open despite periodic flooding and repairs until 1909. The B&O kept the site open after that for picnicking.

The bandstand, the only surviving structure, has been moved twice. At the park's closing, it was moved to Arsenal Square (the current location of John Brown's Fort), then later to the park at Washington and Gilmore Streets. It is referred to as The Bandstand or the Town Gazebo, and many civic, cultural, and recreational activities take place there.

The bridge was destroyed by flooding in 1896, as was a replacement bridge in 1924. The remaining structures on the island were destroyed in a 1942 flood.

=== 20th century ===
==== 2nd Niagara Movement Conference ====
On August 15, 1906, Black author and scholar W. E. B. Du Bois led the first meeting on American soil of the new Niagara Movement. Named after the site of its initial meeting in Fort Erie, Ontario, Canada on the Niagara River, the movement met on the campus of Storer College, a primarily Black college that operated until 1955. (After it closed, the campus became part of Harpers Ferry National Historical Park). The three-day gathering, which was held to work for civil rights for African Americans, was later described by DuBois as "one of the greatest meetings that American Negroes ever held". Attendees walked from Storer College to the farm of the Murphy family, the location at the time of John Brown's historic "fort," the armory's firehouse. As a result, the fort was soon moved to the Storer campus, where it became the college's central icon. After the college closed in 1955, the National Park Service moved it back to as close as possible to its original location.

==== Harpers Ferry National Monument and National Historical Park ====
National Park Service map of Harper's Ferry showing the Appalachian Trail, with (1) being the scene of John Brown's raid

A 1936 flood left the lower town "shabby and almost uninhabited", with no bridge across the Shenandoah to Virginia and no highway bridge to Maryland. All remaining structures on Virginius Island were destroyed.

The backbone of the effort to preserve and commemorate Harpers Ferry was Henry T. MacDonald, President of Storer, an amateur historian appointed by West Virginia Governor Okey Patteson as head of the Harpers Ferry National Monument Commission. He was assisted by the Representative from West Virginia's Second District, Jennings Randolph, who in 1935 introduced a bill to establish Harpers Ferry National Military Park in "the area where the most important events of [John Brown's raid] took place. Although this bill did not pass, the flood of 1936 made the project more feasible by destroying buildings not historically important and thus freeing land. After several other attempts, a bill creating Harpers Ferry National Monument was passed and signed by President Roosevelt in 1944, subject to the proviso that nothing would be done with it until the war ended.

An urgent priority was the new highway, which is today U.S. Route 340. A new bridge connecting Sandy Hook, Maryland with Loudoun County, Virginia opened in October 1947, on which work had begun in 1941 but was interrupted by the war. Another new bridge over the Shenandoah connecting Virginia to Bolivar Heights, West Virginia, opened two years later. Highway traffic now bypassed Harpers Ferry entirely. Land acquisition started in lower Harpers Ferry; the project was supported both by Harpers Ferry mayor Gilbert Perry and Governor Patteson. Twenty-two eviction notices were served in the lower town, and two taverns closed.Property acquisition, not all of which was unproblematic, was completed in 1952 and presented to the United States in January 1953. The National Monument's first on-site employee, John T. Willett, began work in 1954.

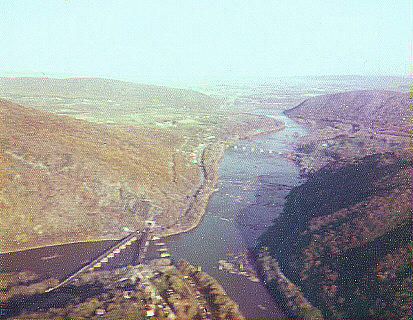
Aerial view of Harpers Ferry from the west in October 1974

In 1957, The Baltimore Sun reported that the lower town was "a sagging and rotted ghost town." The idea of making Harpers Ferry into a National Monument was to prevent the further deterioration and to rebuild the tourist industry. The first task of the Park Service was to stabilize the buildings on Shenandoah Street, the main commercial street of lower Harpers Ferry. Roofs were covered, missing windows replaced, walls on the verge of collapse reinforced, and debris removed. Post-1859 buildings were not restored, and most were removed. The NPS built a Visitor Center and a John Brown Museum. Harpers Ferry National Monument became Harpers Ferry National Historical Park on May 29, 1963.

"Recreationists" who wanted a park and did not care about the history were a problem. Local residents did not want to lose recreational opportunities, but swimming and fishing on the Shenandoah shore, formerly common, were prohibited. In order to keep recreationists out of the historic area, and especially Virginius Island, John Brown's Fort was moved to Arsenal Square from a now-inconvenient location on the former Storer College campus, parking in the lower town was prohibited, and a shuttle bus service begun. Tensions between the NPS and town residents were ongoing. However, the NPS helped the town achieve Main Street Status from the National Trust for Historic Preservation in 2001.

The population of Harpers Ferry continued to decline in the 20th century. The majority of the surviving homes in Harpers Ferry are historic, some of which are registered on the National Register of Historic Places.

=== 21st century ===
On July 23, 2015, a fire broke out in downtown Harpers Ferry, destroying eight or nine businesses and two apartments in two historic buildings. The buildings are being rebuilt.

In the early morning of December 21, 2019, multiple cars of a train owned by CSX derailed from the railroad bridge crossing the Potomac River. The derailment damaged a portion of the Goodloe E. Byron Memorial Pedestrian Walkway, which is attached to the railroad bridge and connects the Appalachian Trail between West Virginia and Maryland. Although the accident did not result in any injuries or fatalities, it effectively inhibited all pedestrian access across the Potomac. The bridge reopened in early July 2020.

==== Hill Top House project ====
The Hill Top House Hotel, which had opened in 1888 to accommodate African Americans as the sole hotel in Harpers Ferry that would accept them as guests, burned in 1911. It was then rebuilt on a larger scale, but that building also burned in 1919. It was rebuilt a second time on a slightly smaller scale but closed in 2008. As of 2021, developers plan to demolish it and build a new 120-room hotel on the site. Controversies about the impact such a proposed venue would have on the town have delayed its development.

== Archaeology ==
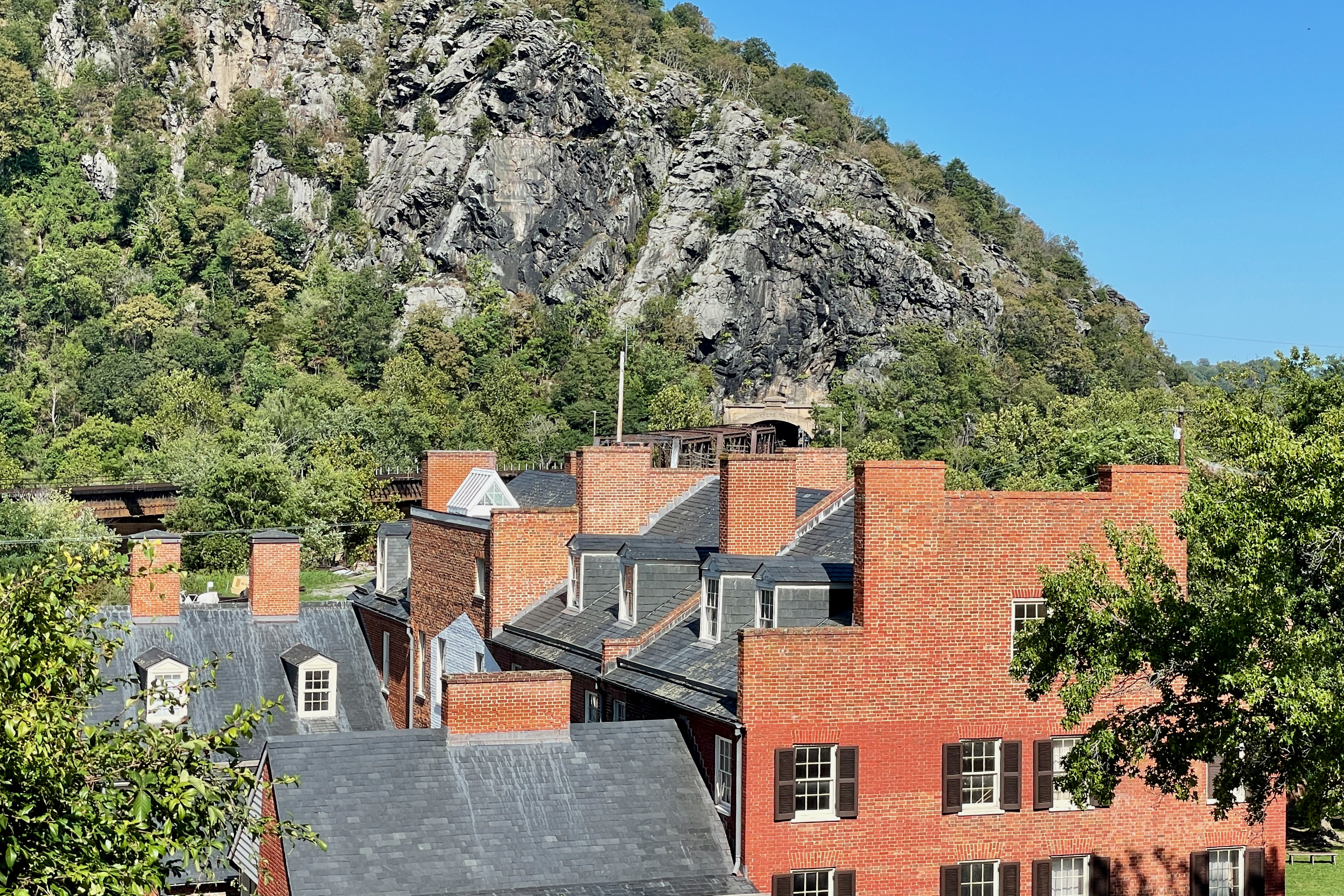
A much faded Mennen's Borated Talcum Toilet Powder advertisement on the cliff face of Maryland Heights opposite Harpers Ferry

Under the auspices of the National Park Service, the archaeology of the town of Harpers Ferry as well as that of Virginius Island have been studied in depth. The journal Historical Archaeology published its entire volume 28, no. 4, issue of 1994 on Harpers Ferry.

== Geography ==
According to the U.S. Census Bureau, the town has a total area of 0.61 square miles (1.58 km^{2}), of which 0.53 square miles (1.37 km^{2}) is land and 0.08 square miles (0.21 km^{2}) is water. Some properties are currently threatened by development. From most of Harpers Ferry, a fading advertisement for Mennen's Borated Talcum Toilet Powder painted on the cliff face of Maryland Heights decades ago is still visible.

The geographical and physical features of Harpers Ferry were the principal reasons for its settlement and eventual industrial development. It is a natural transportation hub and a major river, the Shenandoah, joins the Potomac River at Harpers Ferry. It guarded the entrance to Virginia's large Shenandoah Valley, and the Potomac provided easy access to Washington. The valleys of the rivers made it possible to build the never-completed Chesapeake and Ohio Canal, then the Baltimore and Ohio Railroad, and shortly after that the Winchester and Potomac Railroad. The first railroad junction in the United States was at Harpers Ferry, and telegraph lines passed through the town. The armory, and later other industries, were located in Harpers Ferry because of the abundant water power available from the rivers.

The ferry ended in 1824, when a covered wooden road bridge by the name of Wager's Bridge was built. Harpers Ferry was the site of the first and for many years the only railroad bridge across the Potomac River, the Baltimore and Ohio Railroad's bridge, built in 1836–37. None of Washington, D.C.'s bridges connecting it with Virginia carried more than horse traffic until after the American Civil War. In 1851, a second bridge was built, across the Shenandoah, one of the earliest Bollman trusses. A newer Bollman truss bridge, which carried both rail and highway traffic, opened in 1870 but was washed away in a flood in 1936.

The town's original lower section is on a flood plain created by the two rivers. It is surrounded by higher ground, and since the 20th century has been part of Harpers Ferry National Historical Park. Most of the remainder, which includes the more elevated populated area, is included in the separate Harpers Ferry Historic District. Two other National Register of Historic Places properties adjoin the town: the B & O Railroad Potomac River Crossing and St. Peter's Roman Catholic Church.

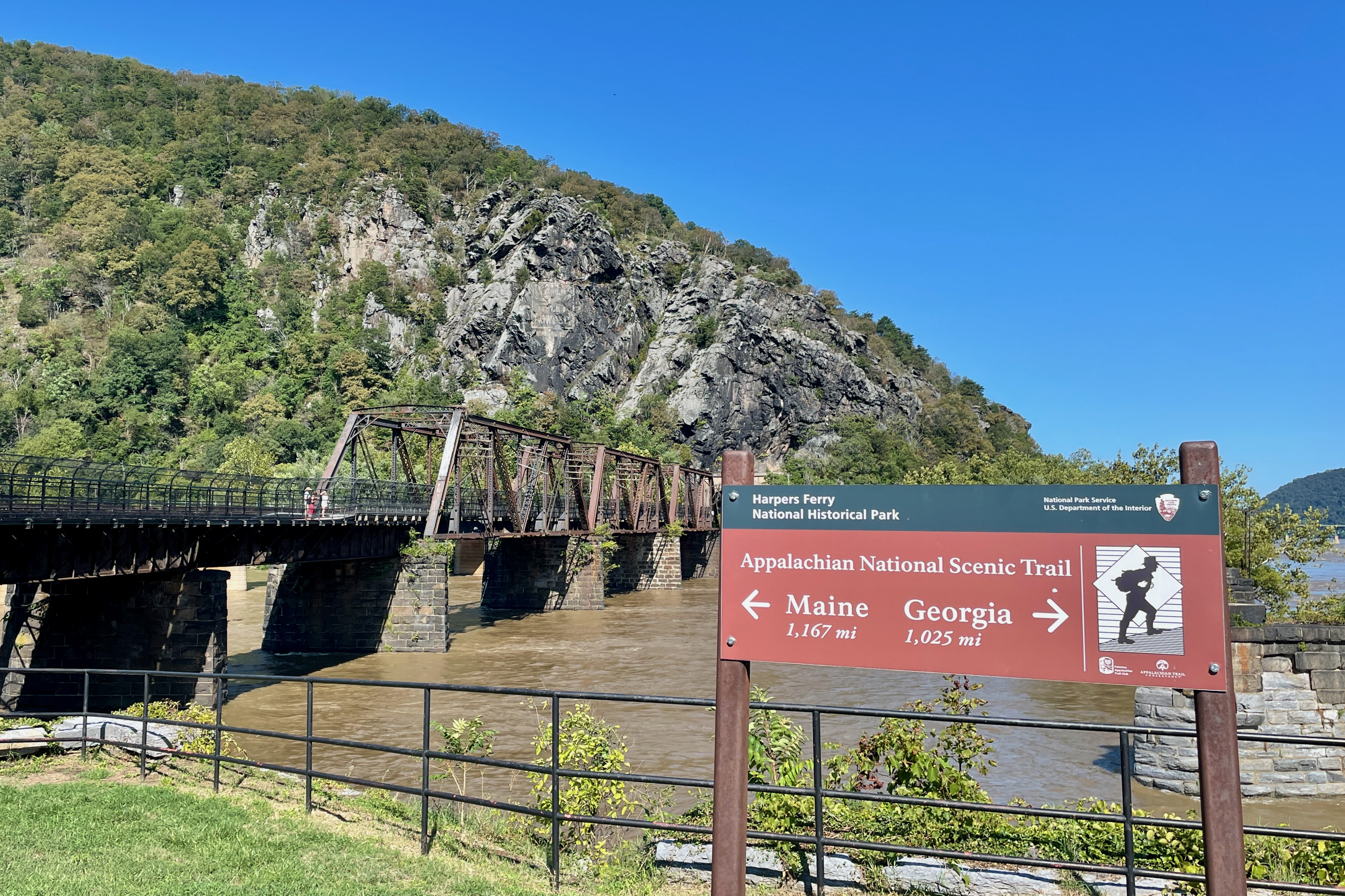
Park sign with mileage information for the Appalachian Trail

The Appalachian Trail Conservancy (ATC) headquarters is in Harpers Ferry. The Appalachian Trail passes directly through town, which some consider the psychological midpoint of the trail despite the exact physical midpoint is being farther north in Pennsylvania. Uniquely, the towns of Harpers Ferry and adjoining Bolivar have partnered with the ATC to be declared a united Appalachian Trail Community.

=== Climate ===
The climate in this area is characterized by hot, humid summers and generally mild to cool winters, similar to nearby Martinsburg. According to the Köppen Climate Classification system, Harpers Ferry has a humid subtropical climate, abbreviated "Cfa" on climate maps using the 27 °F/-3 °C isotherm, as its coldest month averages 31 °F/-0.5 °C or, if the 32 °F/0 °C isotherm is used, a humid continental climate, abbreviated "Dfa".

== Demographics ==
Historical population
| Census | Pop. | Note | %± |
|---|---|---|---|
| 1850 | 1,747 | | — |
| 1860 | 1,339 | | −23.4% |
| 1880 | 764 | | — |
| 1890 | 958 | | 25.4% |
| 1900 | 896 | | −6.5% |
| 1910 | 766 | | −14.5% |
| 1920 | 713 | | −6.9% |
| 1930 | 705 | | −1.1% |
| 1940 | 665 | | −5.7% |
| 1950 | 822 | | 23.6% |
| 1960 | 572 | | −30.4% |
| 1970 | 423 | | −26.0% |
| 1980 | 361 | | −14.7% |
| 1990 | 308 | | −14.7% |
| 2000 | 307 | | −0.3% |
| 2010 | 286 | | −6.8% |
| 2020 | 269 | | −5.9% |
U.S. Decennial Census

=== 2010 census ===
As of the census of 2010, there were 286 people, 131 households, and 78 families residing in the town. The population density was 539.6 inhabitants per square mile (208.3/km^{2}). There were 175 housing units at an average density of 330.2 per square mile (127.5/km^{2}). The racial makeup of the town was 94% White, 4% African American, 1% Native American, 0% from other races, and 1% from two or more races. Hispanic or Latino of any race were 1% of the population.

Of the 131 households, 21% had children under the age of 18 living with them; 44% were married couples living together; 13% had a female householder with no husband present; 3% had a male householder with no wife present; and 41% were non-families. Individuals were 29%, with 15% living alone who was 65 years of age or older. The average household size was 2.18 and the average family size, 2.69.

The median age in the town was 52. Of all residents, 17% were under the age of 18; 3% between the ages of 18 and 24; 19% from 25 to 44; 38% from 45 to 64; and 23% 65 years of age or older. The gender makeup of the town was 49.3% male and 50.7% female.

== Government ==
The Harpers Ferry Police Department, or HFPD, is the official municipal police force for Harpers Ferry. The agency has three sworn full-time officers, two sworn part-time officers, and one civilian employee. The current Chief of Police is John D. Brown.

The Harpers Ferry Police Department has mutual policing agreements with both the Harpers Ferry National Historical Park Rangers and the Jefferson County Sheriff's Office.

== Politics ==
Harpers Ferry is part of West Virginia's 2nd congressional district, represented by Republican Riley Moore since 2025. Republican Bill Ridenour represents it in the West Virginia House of Delegates as part of the 100th district, and Republican Jason Barrett represents it in the West Virginia Senate as part of the 16th district.

== Schools ==
- Harpers Ferry Middle School
- C. W. Shipley Elementary School

== Transportation ==
=== Roads and highways ===
The only significant highway providing access to Harpers Ferry is U.S. Route 340. Although signed north–south, the road runs generally eastward from Harpers Ferry to Frederick, Maryland, and south to Greenville, Virginia. Harpers Ferry and Bolivar host an unsigned alternate route of U.S. Route 340, which follows Washington Street, High Street, and Shenandoah Street.

=== Public transportation ===
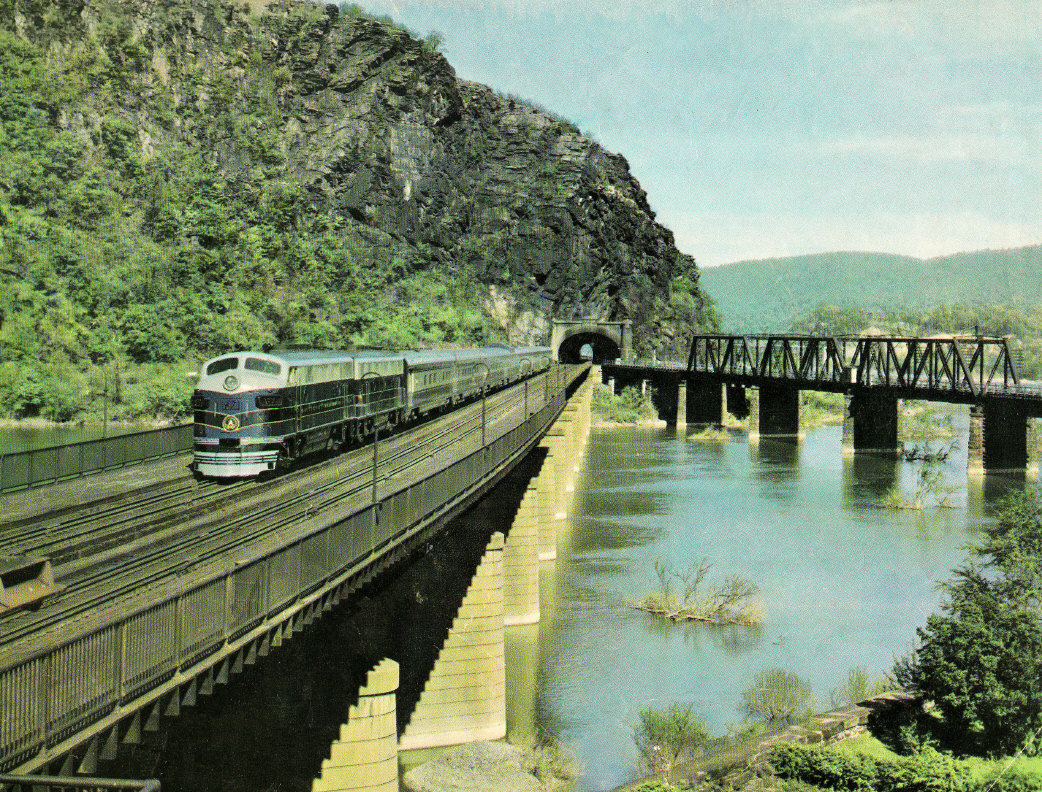
Baltimore and Ohio Railroad Columbian at Harpers Ferry in 1949

Amtrak provides service to Harpers Ferry two times a day on the Floridian line from Chicago to Miami via Washington, D.C., once in each direction. It is also served by MARC commuter rail on the Brunswick Line from Martinsburg, West Virginia, to Washington. The city's passenger rail station is at the West Virginia end of the historic B&O railroad bridge across the Potomac River. The town has an extensive rail history, having previously been serviced by the Baltimore and Ohio Railroad as well as multiple freight lines.

The Eastern Panhandle Transit Authority (EPTA) operates to Harpers Ferry and surrounding Jefferson County.

== Popular culture ==
- Harpers Ferry is a location in the game Fallout 76
- Liberty Falls, the fictional setting of the Call of Duty: Black Ops 6 zombies map of the same name, is loosely based on Harpers Ferry.
- The first section of the song "Beach Life-in-Death" by Car Seat Headrest is set in Harpers Ferry.
- The Town's Inn is featured in season 3 of Hotel Hell, hosted by Gordon Ramsay.

== Notable people ==
- Nathan Cook Brackett
- John Brown
- John Brown's raiders
- Drusilla Dunjee Houston
- Col. Edward M. Kirby
- Riley Moore
- Celeste Brackett Newcomer
- William Ridenour, state legislator
- Lewis Washington

== See also ==
- Beall-Air
- Heyward Shepherd monument
- Hill Top House Hotel
- Journey Through Hallowed Ground National Heritage Area
- USS Harpers Ferry (LSD 49)
- Virginius Island, West Virginia
