= Skirmishes around Vincennes (1786) =

American victory in the Northwest Indian War

- Part of the Northwest Indian War
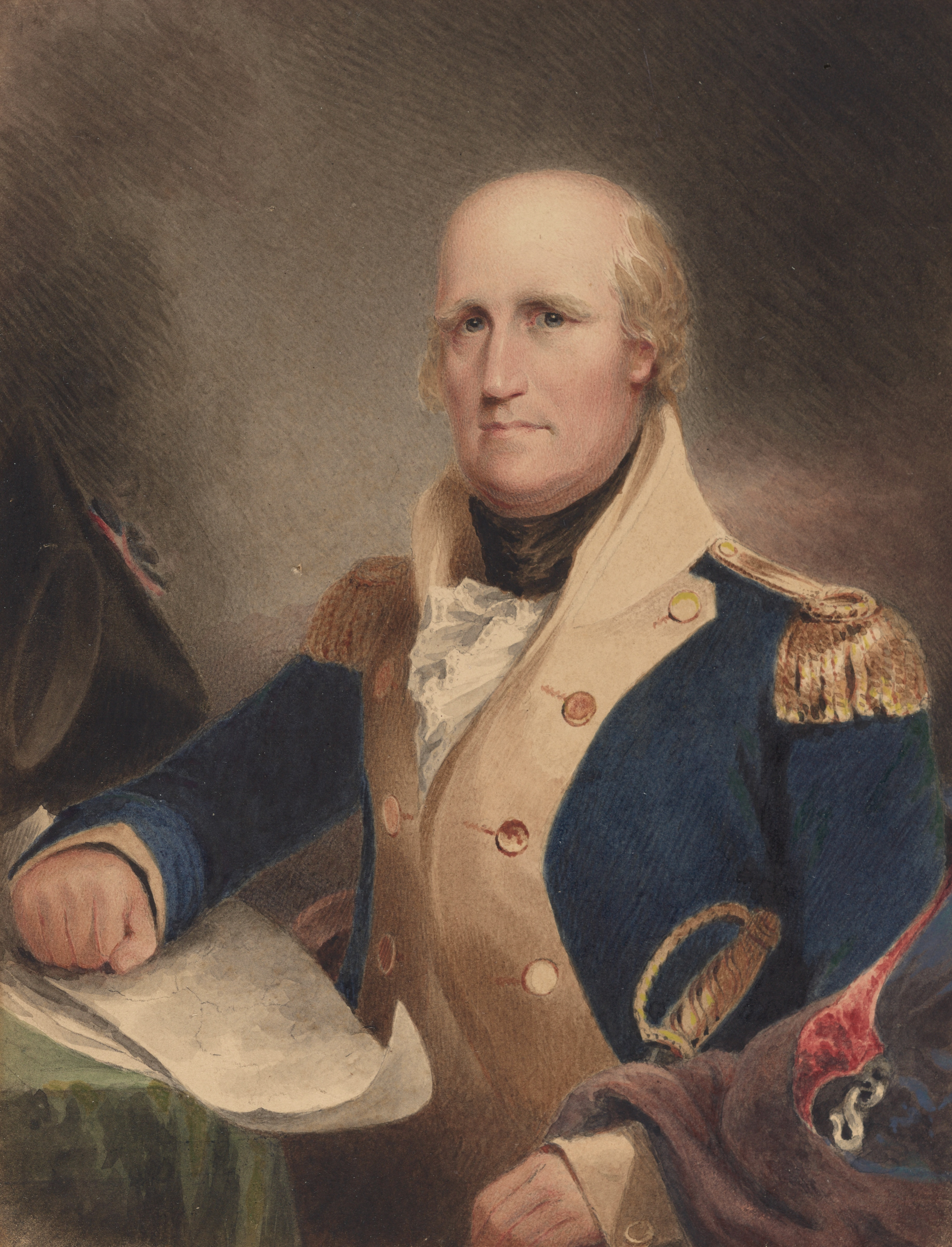
- An 1825 portrait of George Rogers Clark
Date	1786
Location	Vincennes, Indiana
Result	American victory

Belligerents
United States	Piankeshaw; Miami; Wea

Commanders and leaders
John Small; Daniel Sullivan; John Hardin; George Rogers Clark	Unknown

During the onset of the Northwest Indian War (1786–1795), there were numerous skirmishes around Vincennes in 1786 between American settlers and Native Americans near Vincennes, a frontier town on the Wabash River. American pioneers had been pouring into the area after the American Revolutionary War, creating tensions with the Native inhabitants of the region.

On April 15, 1786, American militiamen from Vincennes, responding to an attack on a river boat, attacked Natives along the Embarras River; the Americans had three men killed in the skirmish. As hostilities continued, Americans appealed to Virginia Militia officer George Rogers Clark in Kentucky to protect Vincennes from Natives.

Meanwhile, Jean Marie Philippe Le Gras, the French civilian commandant at Vincennes, worked to maintain peace between Natives and Americans. He blamed the crisis on indiscriminate American attacks on friendly Natives, and unsuccessfully tried to expel Americans from Vincennes.

== Background ==
Vincennes, an outpost of New France on the Wabash River, became a part of the British Empire in 1763 after Britain's victory in the French and Indian War. In the American Revolutionary War, American soldier George Rogers Clark seized Vincennes on behalf of Virginia, which in 1778 dubbed the vast region "Illinois County." The 1783 Treaty of Paris formally ceded the area to the United States, and in 1784, Virginia surrendered its claim to the U.S. Confederation Congress. Before leaving, Virginia official John Todd appointed French merchant Jean Marie Philippe Le Gras (c. 1734–1788) to govern Vincennes.

Americans poured into the region around Vincennes, hoping to be granted lands by the U.S. government. The influx of settlers created tensions with the Natives, who usually had friendly relations with the French inhabitants. French officials in Vincennes tried to avoid involvement in the violence between Americans and Natives. French inhabitants of Vincennes numbered 900. In early 1786, Kentucky land speculator John Filson visited Vincennes and found about 70 American families among the 300 houses, but recorded that the French resented the Americans and their whiskey, that the Americans resented the French and their idleness, and that the Natives resented intrusion on their lands. In response to the violence between Natives and Americans, on March 16, 1786, Filson wrote to George Rogers Clark in Kentucky on behalf of the Vincennes residents, asking for aid against the "imperious savages."

== Embarras River skirmish ==
Embarras River skirmish
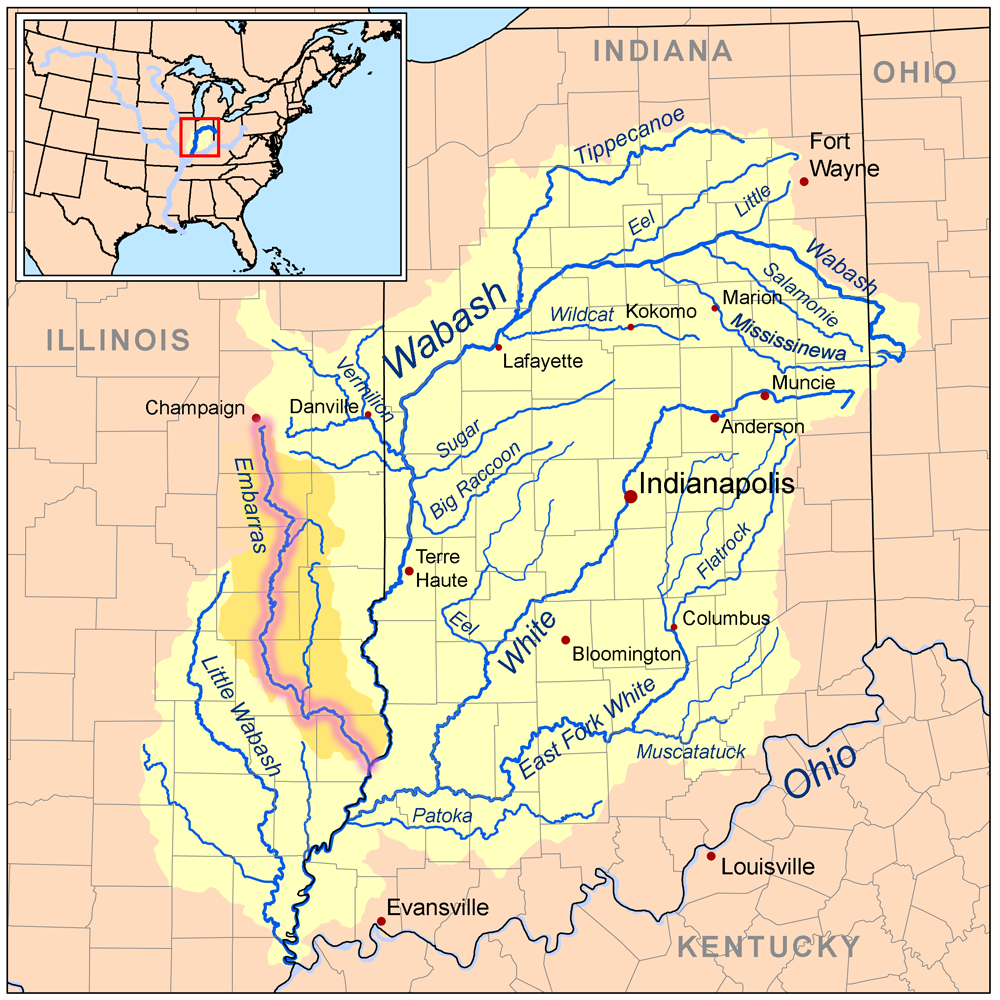
- Map of the Embarras River
Date	April 15, 1786
Location	Near the Embarras River 38.64371803802736°N 87.6166562250676°W
Result	Piankeshaw victory

Belligerents
Piankeshaw	United States

Commanders and leaders
Unknown	John Small; Daniel Sullivan

Casualties and losses
1 wounded	3 killed Several wounded

On April 14, 1786, a Piankeshaw war party attacked an American boat on the Wabash River, killing one man and wounding two others. On April 15, American militiamen, led by John Small, Moses Henry, and Daniel Sullivan, left Vincennes to retrieve the wounded Americans. At the Embarras River, they attacked some Natives who had recently visited Vincennes. In the skirmish, the Americans had three killed and several wounded; one Native was wounded. Afterwards, the Natives withdrew to the Vermilion River to gather reinforcements. Daniel Sullivan and his men, meanwhile, built a defensive stockade, Sullivan's Station, near Vincennes.

Le Gras negotiated a truce with the Natives, but it did not last. In the weeks that followed, Miamis killed several Americans near Cahokia, and Natives shot one American outside Vincennes and burned another, leaving his remains hanging in a tree. On June 1, Filson departed Vincennes by water with a petition asking Congress to establish a military garrison at Vincennes. His canoe was attacked and two of his men were killed. He escaped and returned to Vincennes, where he wrote another letter updating Clark on the more recent attacks.

On June 21, Natives attacked Americans working in a cornfield outside Vincennes, wounding two, one of them seriously. Americans led by Daniel Sullivan came to Vincennes, where they seized a sick Native who was being cared for by a Frenchman. The Americans killed and scalped the Native and dragged his body through the town. Because this action took place within Vincennes, the French could no longer remain uninvolved. Le Gras ordered all Americans without a passport to leave the town, but they refused to comply.

On July 15, 1786, a party of about 450 Piankeshaw and Wea warriors descended the Wabash in forty-seven war canoes, determined "to exterminate all the Americans who might be in these lands." Le Gras and François Busseron met with them and again managed to keep the peace. The Natives dispersed after firing a few shots at Sullivan's house, but promised to return in the autumn.

== Hardin–Patton expedition ==
While these negotiations were still underway, an expedition of 130 Kentuckians led by John Hardin and James Patton was en route, ostensibly coming to Vincennes's aid. Before reaching Vincennes, they attacked a Miami and Piankeshaw hunting camp on the Saline River, near present Shawneetown, Illinois. The Americans attacked without first determining if the Natives were friendly or hostile, killing six and wounding seven. The Kentuckians, with one killed and four wounded, retreated to Louisville, Kentucky.

Among the dead was the father-in-law of Pacanne, a Miami chief. Le Gras expressed astonishment that the Americans had killed friendly Natives, reporting that the Americans had "cut them up" and "hacked them into pieces." Le Gras blamed the crisis on American "outlaws," particularly Daniel Sullivan. He sent a message to Clark in Kentucky, asking him to send troops to defend Vincennes before the Natives returned with overwhelming numbers.

== Clark's Wabash expedition ==
Virginia Governor Patrick Henry asked the Confederation Congress if they would send troops to defend the frontier. When Congress failed to act, Henry authorized the militia officers of the District of Kentucky to organize their own defensive measures. On August 2, the Kentucky officers voted in favor of a punitive expedition against Natives along the Wabash River. General George Rogers Clark was appointed commander-in-chief, with General Benjamin Logan as his second-in-command. The officers called for 2,000 militiamen to gather at Clarksville on September 10.

By September 13, only 1,200 militiamen had gathered at Clarksville. The officers decided the force was too small to proceed directly to the Wabash. A number of officers, including Logan, were sent back to Kentucky to gather "delinquents and deserters" and muster additional militiamen. Clark, meanwhile, would take the 1,200 men to Vincennes and await the reinforcements. On September 14, Clark changed plans, and instead directed Logan to lead his men against the Shawnees. Logan eventually gathered about 800 men and raided Shawnee villages along the Mad River in early October.

Clark departed Clarksville on September 17 with about 1,200 men, "the most formidable force yet collected in the West under American arms." The march to Vincennes took eight days. Even before reaching Vincennes, militiamen expressed dissatisfaction. There were rumors that Clark was frequently intoxicated, the truth of which has been debated. The Kentuckians spent eight more days at Vincennes before marching north along the Wabash. Faced with dwindling supplies and rumors of a formidable Native force gathering to meet them, Kentucky militiamen deserted by the hundreds. Clark was compelled to return to Vincennes without having accomplished anything. At Vincennes, Clark tried negotiating a peace with the Natives, but this was also unsuccessful.

Clark remained in Vincennes with a garrison 150 men to help defend Vincennes, but this force soon turned into a lawless mob. At one point, three Spanish traders arrived at Vincennes with trade goods, and Clark seized their cargo for the militia based on their lack of passports. The U.S. later sent an apology to the King of Spain. Vincennes petitioned Congress for help, with one resident heard praying, "Lord, please send the Kentuckians home and bring back the Indians!"

== Aftermath ==
Secretary of War Henry Knox sent Colonel Josiah Harmar and the First American Regiment to restore order. The Kentucky militia fled Vincennes at the approach of U.S. Regulars. Colonel Harmar arrived in July 1787 and declined to involve himself in land disputes against American settlers. He visited Kaskaskia and Cahokia and met with Wea and Piankashaw delegations, then left Jean François Hamtramck in command of two companies, which built and occupied Fort Knox at Vincennes, thus stabilizing the situation.

== Notes ==
=== References ===
- Allison, Harold (1986). The Tragic Saga of the Indiana Indians. Paducah: Turner Publishing Company. ISBN 0-938021-07-9.
- Barnhart, John D.; Riker, Dorothy L. (1971). Indiana to 1816. The Colonial Period. Indianapolis: Indiana Historical Society. ISBN 0-87195-109-6.
- Cayton, Andrew R. L. (1996). Frontier Indiana. Bloomington, Indiana: Indiana University Press. ISBN 978-0-253-33048-2.
- Day, Richard (1994). Daniel Sullivan, Frontiersman and Adventurer. Selected Papers From The 1991 And 1992 George Rogers Clark Trans-Appalachian Frontier History Conferences. National Park Service.
- Heath, William (2015). William Wells and the Struggle for the Old Northwest. Norman: University of Oklahoma Press. ISBN 9780806151472.
- Helderman, Leonard Clinton (1938a). "John Filson's Narrative of His Defeat on the Wabash, 1786" (PDF). Filson Club History Quarterly. 12 (4): 187–99.
- Helderman, Leonard C. (1938b). Helderman, Leonard C. (ed.). "Danger on the Wabash: Vincennes Letters of 1786". Indiana Magazine of History. 34 (4): 455–67. JSTOR 27787016.
- Helderman, L. C. (1938c). "The Northwest Expedition of George Rogers Clark, 1786–1787". The Mississippi Valley Historical Review. 25 (3): 317–34. doi:10.2307/1897251. JSTOR 1897251.
- James, James Alton (1928). The Life of George Rogers Clark. Chicago: University of Chicago Press. ISBN 1-4286-1023-5.
- Sword, Wiley (1985). President Washington's Indian War: The Struggle for the Old Northwest, 1790–1795. Norman: University of Oklahoma Press. ISBN 0-8061-2488-1.
- White, Richard (1991). The Middle Ground: Indians, Empires, and Republics in the Great Lakes Region, 1650–1815. Cambridge: Cambridge University Press. ISBN 0-521-42460-7.
