= Daniel Sullivan (frontiersman) =

Daniel Sullivan (1754 – 1790) was an American military officer and frontiersman of Irish descent.

Daniel Sullivan was born in 1754 into a Virginian family of Irish descent. At age 9, he and another boy, Cunningham, were captured by a party of Lenape during Pontiac's War. Each was adopted and raised along the Muskingum River. In 1772, the two accompanied a trading party to Fort Pitt, where Sullivan was recognized by his brother-in-law, Zadock Wright. Wright successfully bought the two teenage boys, but Sullivan refused to leave his Delaware family unless Wright gave him a beaver hat.

Sullivan soon left his family and returned to Fort Pitt. When Lord Dunmore's War commenced, Sullivan served as a guide for Major John Connolly's Virginia militia company, in which Zadock Wright served as a lieutenant.

During the American Revolutionary War, Sullivan served as a scout and a spy. He hired himself as a boatman to a trader, and travelled to Fort Detroit. There, he was arrested by Lieutenant-Governor Henry Hamilton after he was recognized by an American Indian. Hamilton sent Sullivan to Quebec, where he was paroled in December 1777. Sullivan returned to Fort Pitt, where he was again arrested in 1779 for "endeavouring to make the Delaware Indians break the last treaty of peace."

After his release, Sullivan moved to Louisville. In 1785, Sullivan moved north to Vincennes. He led the Vincennes militia in the Embarras River skirmish. He was killed along the Buffalo Trace in 1790.

== Legacy ==
Sullivan County, Indiana is named for Daniel Sullivan.
