= M1819 Hall rifle =

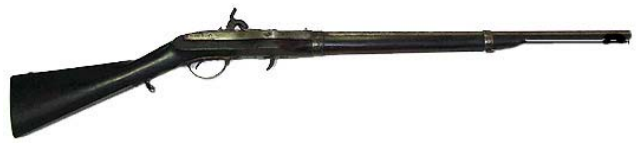
- A Hall-North carbine conversion of the M1819
- Type: Rifle
- Place of origin: United States

Service history
- Used by: United States, Confederate States, Argentina
- Wars: Indian Wars; Mexican–American War; American Civil War; Argentine Civil Wars

Production history
- Designed: 1811
- Produced: 1820s–1840s
- No. built: 23,500 rifles 13,684 regulation carbines 14,000 Hall-North M1843 carbines
- Variants: several carbine variants

Specifications
- Mass: 10.25 lb (4.6 kg) (rifle); 8 lb (3.6 kg) (carbine)
- Length: 52.5 inches (1,330 mm) (original) various: 48 to 60 inches (1,200 to 1,500 mm) (conversions)
- Barrel length: 32.7 inches (830 mm) (rifle); 21–23 inches (530–580 mm) (carbine)
- Cartridge: .525 inches (13.3 mm) Ball (original); Paper with .69 inches (18 mm) Ball (conversion)
- Caliber: .525 inches (13.3 mm).69 inches (18 mm)
- Action: Flintlock/percussion lock (conversion)
- Rate of fire: 8–9 rounds per minute
- Effective firing range: 80–150 yards (73–137 m)
- Feed system: Breech-loaded

The M1819 Hall rifle was a single-shot breech-loading rifle (also considered something of a hybrid breech and muzzle-loading design) designed by John Hancock Hall, patented on May 21, 1811, and adopted by the U.S. Army in 1819. It was preceded by the Harpers Ferry M1803. It used a pivoting chamber breech design and was made with either flintlock or percussion cap ignition systems. The years of production were from the 1820s to the 1840s at the Harpers Ferry Arsenal. This was the first breech-loading rifle to be adopted in large numbers by any nation's army, but not the first breech-loading military rifle – the Ferguson rifle was used briefly by the British Army in the American Revolutionary War. The Hall rifle remained overshadowed by common muskets and muzzleloading rifles which were still prevalent until the Civil War. The early flintlocks were mostly converted to percussion ignition.

== Comparative trials ==
United States Army inspectors conducted trials by having a 38-man infantry company fire at a 100 yards (91 m) target for ten minutes at their own speed.

Weapon	Rounds fired	Targets hit	Percentage striking target
Hall rifles	1,198	430	36%
Army-issue muzzle-loading smoothbore muskets	845	208	25%
Muzzle-loading rifles	494	164	33%

== Production history ==
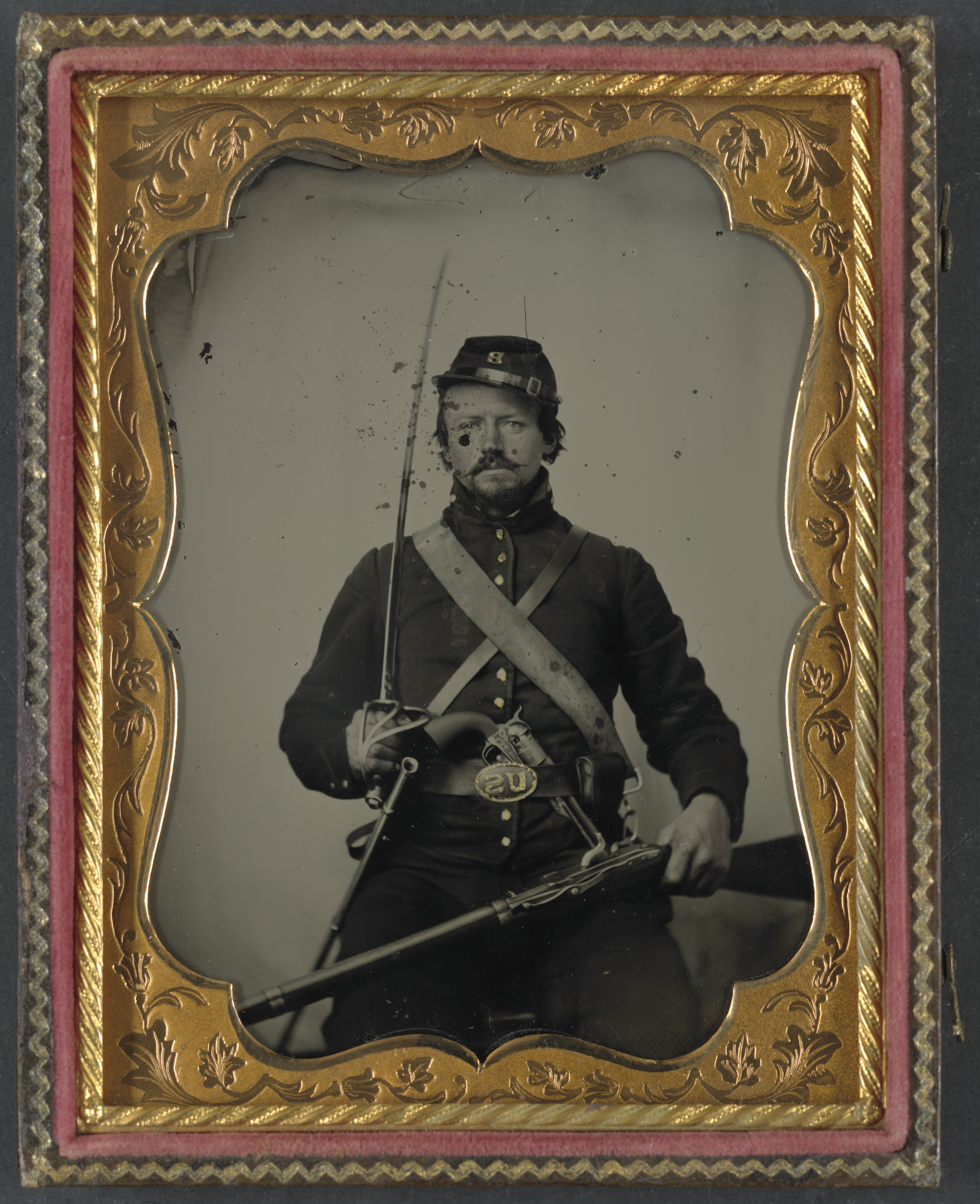
An unidentified Union army soldier with a Hall carbine

The original flintlock model of the Hall rifle had a 32.5 in (830 mm) barrel rifled with 16 "clockwise" (right-hand) grooves, making a full rotation in 96 in (2,400 mm). The muzzle was reamed to a depth of 1.5 in (38 mm), creating the illusion of a smoothbore when the user looked down the muzzle of the firearm. Overall length was 52.5 in (1,330 mm), and weight without bayonet was 10.25 lb (4.65 kg). The rifle fired a .525 in (13.3 mm) ball weighing 220 gr (14 g) (one-half ounce), using a 100 gr (6.5 g) black powder charge and 10 gr (0.65 g) of fine powder primer (flintlock versions only).

The carbine design was produced beginning in 1833, using a smoothbore barrel of 23 in (580 mm) in length. It had an overall length of 43 in (1,100 mm), weighed 8 lb (3.6 kg), and was the first caplock firearm adopted by the U.S. Army. The following year, a carbine in .69 in (18 mm) caliber was introduced for the Regiment of Dragoons, with a second run in 1836–1837. Barrel length was reduced to 21 in (530 mm) in 1840, and a "fishtail" breech lever design credited to U.S. Army Captain James Huger was also introduced for the next 7,000 carbines, including the M1842 carbine, the final "regulation design" of the series.

In 1843, the Hall-North carbine, variously known as the M1843 and the "improved 1840", featured a side-mounted Henry North-Edward Savage breech lever. 11,000 Hall-North carbines were manufactured with a 21 in (530 mm), .52 in (13 mm) caliber barrel. The Hall production line at Harper's Ferry closed in 1844, but between 1843 and 1846, 3,000 M1843 carbines were also manufactured by Simeon North.

== Action ==
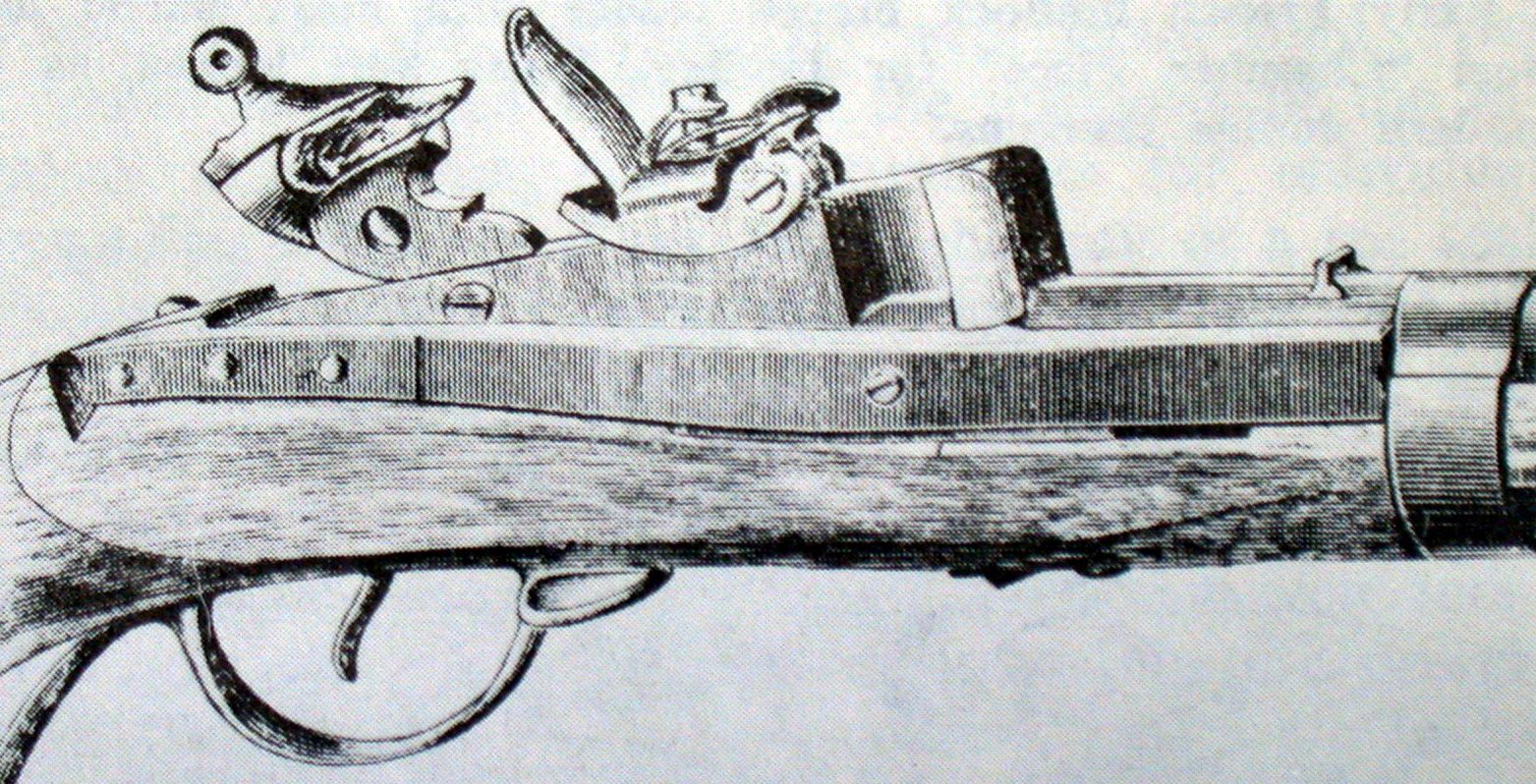
Hall-rifle. breech open

The back several inches of the barrel (the chamber) is a separate piece that pivots upwards from the front for reloading, similar in concept to the later Swedish-Norwegian kammerlader. In essence, the weapon was still loaded front to back, but without the need to ram the charge all the way from the muzzle, similar in concept to loading a cylinder of an early cap-and-ball (percussion) revolver. One could also think of it as similar to loading a short barreled, single shot muzzle-loading "horse pistol", which then hinges down behind an extra several feet of barrel, avoiding the need for extracting the long ram-rod from its underbarrel rings, rotating it so the ramming head faced the muzzle, ramming the charge down the barrel, extracting the rod, flipping it again, and then returning it to its holding rings. With the short chamber, powder and ball could be quickly loaded by hand. More importantly, as with all breechloaders (and muzzle-loaders, prior to the invention of the Minie ball), the fact that one didn't need to load through the whole barrel allowed for the use of rifling in a standard-issue front-line military weapon (as opposed to weapons issued in small numbers to elite troops such as sharpshooters).

In order for rifling to work, the projectile must fit very snugly in the barrel, which makes it harder and slower to ram the bullet down the barrel. Once fired, black powder builds up thick fouling very quickly, which makes the gun even harder to load; a typical muzzle-loading rifle couldn't be fired more than 3–4 times before requiring cleaning, or the bullet would be impossible to force down the barrel on loading, even with the mallet typically issued to riflemen to aid in forcing the bullet through the rifling while loading after the first two shots. This fact is why soldiers were still issued smoothbore muskets firing loose-fitting round balls, long after the merits of rifling were known; rifles simply couldn't be loaded fast enough for use in open-field combat, even though they were far more effective shot-for-shot. The loose fit of a musket ball allowed for faster loading, even after fouling built up, but also made adding rifling useless, since it wouldn't work without a tight-fitting projectile. With a breech-loader, a tight-fitting projectile can be used, as it doesn't have to be forced down the barrel, which allows the use of rifling as well as a fast rate of fire. This fact means that even a breechloader that only achieved the same rate of fire as a muzzle-loading musket would still be superior to the musket, as the breechloader could be rifled and the musket couldn't, although in fact, breechloaders generally also had a greater rate of fire.

The development was primarily the work of Hall, who had been working on a design in the first two decades of the 19th century, receiving critical patents during the time. The work caught the interest of Army, which led to the contract at the end of the latter decade. The breech-loading design was made possible by his focus on using carefully machined components to form a seal, but still allowing enough tolerance for the breech to be opened easily. While precisely machined for the time, the technology of the day didn't allow for tolerances close enough to make a satisfactory seal, which was also one of the biggest hindrances to the creation of a successful revolver until some years later. The Hall rifle offered a significant increase in rate of fire over muzzleloading rifles and muskets (mostly due to the fact that one didn't have to manipulate the long, awkward ramming-rod every time one loaded). However, the design suffered from the gas leakage around the interface of the separate chamber and the bore (much as gases escape from the gap between cylinder and barrel of a revolver), resulting in the necessity of a heavier powder charge that still produced much less muzzle velocity than its muzzleloading competition. No serious efforts were made to develop a seal to reduce the loss of gas from the breech. The penetrating ability of its .52 in (13 mm) caliber ball for the rifle was only one third of that of the muzzleloaders, and the muzzle velocity of the carbine was 25 percent lower than that of the Jenks "Mule Ear" carbine, despite having similar barrel lengths and identical 70 gr (4.5 g) powder charges.

Thousands of rifles were made, though the troops and many leaders preferred the simplicity and lower costs of muzzle-loaded weapons. However, the advantages were clear, and breech-loading designs would grow to dominate rifle procurement after the Civil War. Many of the lessons learned by Hall would benefit designers of the next generation of breech-loaders such as the Sharps rifle (1848), Spencer carbine (1860), Henry rifle (1860), and others.

The Halls were used in the Mexican–American War, against Native Americans, and in other, smaller conflicts. Some rifle saw service in the American Civil War; however, by this time, many rifles were worn out over 30 years of use. Although they were highly unpopular among the Union cavalrymen to whom they were issued, they saw widespread use. Confederate cavalry regiments were equipped with Model 1843 Hall carbines throughout the duration of the war. Furthermore, North Carolina was issued 609 Hall carbines, with fourteen currently held in storage at Fayetteville armorie.

The Buenos Aires State Forces acquired (perhaps around 1854, when the US cavalry began to replace it with the Sharps) a small amount (probably no more than 50), to be used in the fight against the Confederacy and the Indians, remaining in use until 1881, always by the forces of Buenos Aires. It may be that some were issued to the Escort Squadron of Buenos Aires, and others to the infantry. One can be seen at the Museo de Armas de la Nación (establishing that it was used in the war for National Organization between 1852 and 1862). In 1812, there was a Hall rifle in the Artillery Park, not of the same system, but of the original 1811 flintlock model, perhaps a handful of them entered the country (approximately ten), then disappearing from the Park in that same period.

As part of the process, Hall built his own shops and machinery at Harper's Ferry, and along with inventing this weapon, he invented many machines, paving the way for uniform manufacturing of weapons with interchangeable parts. The ruins of his shops are still visible today. In April 2013, the Model 1819 Hall rifle was adopted by the West Virginia Legislature as the official state firearm of West Virginia.

== Similar guns ==
The Sartoris carbine, based on the earlier Crespi breech-loader, was a similar design issued in limited numbers to the British army from 1821–1825. The brass trigger guard also served as a handle to slide the barrel forward, and the breech pivoted upwards to enable loading in a similar manner to contemporary muzzle loading pistols. Sartoris' design was tested on many flintlock arms, including a Baker rifle and a regulation cavalry carbine, and at least one sporting gun was converted to caplock by Alexander Forsyth. One of these rare guns is part of the Royal Armouries collection in Leeds.

== See also ==
- Needle gun
- Rifles in the American Civil War
