= Virginius Island, West Virginia =

Island in Harpers Ferry, West Virginia, United States

Virginius Island
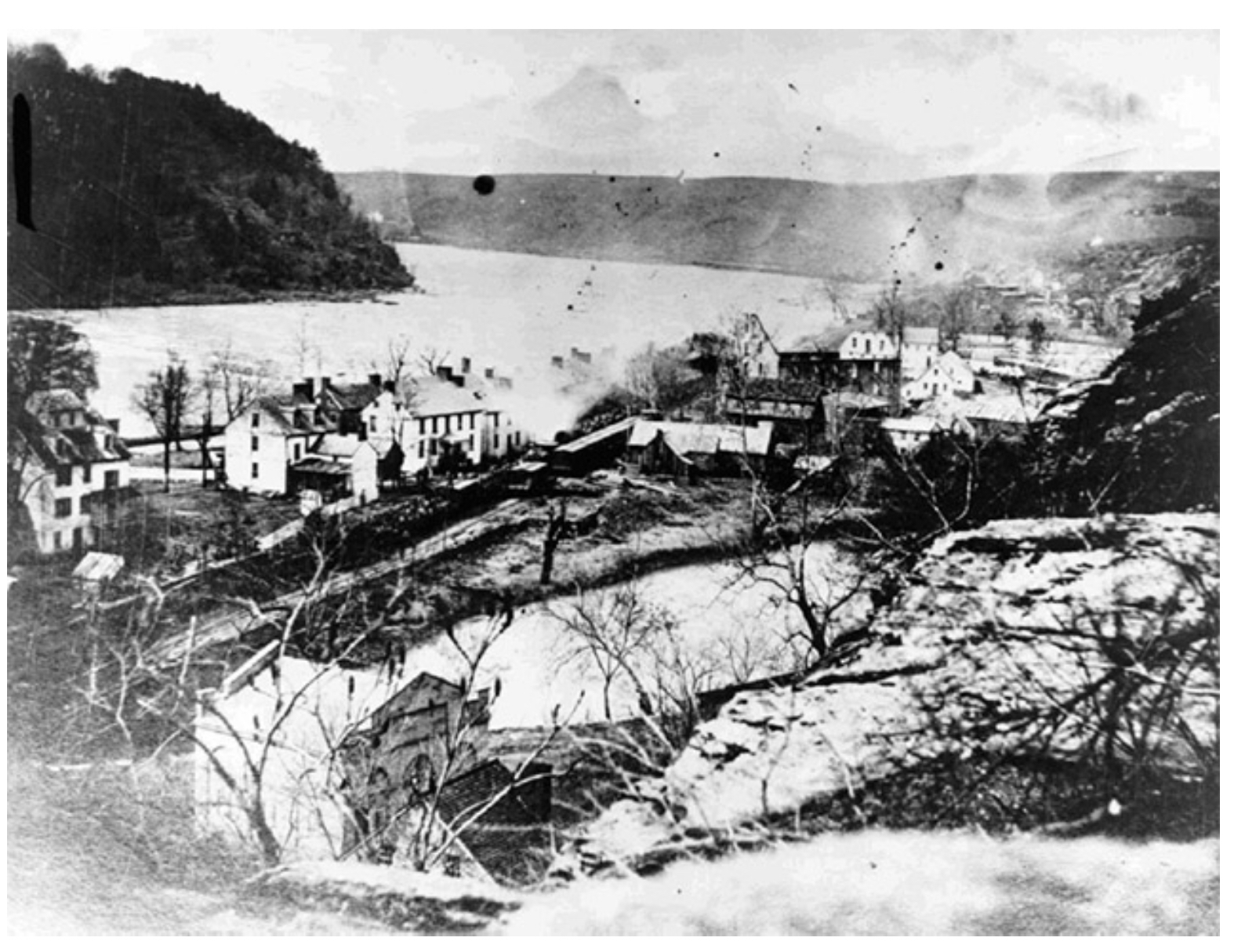
- Virginius Island in 1864, seen from Jefferson Rock. Note the train and roofless building near the center.
- Interactive map of Virginius Island

Geography
- Location: Shenandoah River, West Virginia, United States
- Coordinates: 39°19′17″N 77°44′21″W

Administration
- Harpers Ferry, West Virginia

Virginius Island is a formerly inhabited island of some 12 acres (4.9 ha), on the Shenandoah River in Harpers Ferry, West Virginia. The island was created by the Shenandoah Canal, constructed by the Patowmack Company between 1806 and 1807, which separates it from the town of Harpers Ferry. The canal was constructed to enable boats to bypass rapids on the river, and also channel water to drive machinery. In the nineteenth century Virginius Island contained Harpers Ferry's industry (aside from the Arsenal) and working-class housing: a boarding house and row houses. Virginius Island is part of the Harpers Ferry National Historical Park.

== A thriving industrial town ==
Virginius Island was a thriving industrial town in the first half of the nineteenth century. The Shenandoah was a great source of power by which to operate machinery. There was good access to markets via the Potomac, and even more after the Winchester and Potomac Railroad, which ran through the island, arrived in 1836. Its successor, CSX, runs trains along these tracks every day (2021). The following year brought the Baltimore and Ohio Railroad, joining Harpers Ferry with Baltimore, and soon Washington as well, via its new Potomac River Bridge. For different periods, there were a cotton mill, a flour mill (the longest lived), a sawmill, an iron foundry, a tannery, a rifle factory, a machine shop, a cooperage supplying barrels to the flour mill, and a carriage shop. At its peak in 1850, upwards of 180 residents lived in some twenty houses.

== Impact of the Civil War ==
Virginius Island suffered greatly during the Civil War (1861–1865) The rifle factory was destroyed, as were some of the mills. The destruction of the Harpers Ferry Armory, the region's largest employer, and the destruction, depopulation, and insecurity of the town of Harpers Ferry itself were factors. Much of the population fled to safer locales. For much of the war, the island was used by Union forces as barracks and stables, workshops, corrals, a hospital, and for storage.

== Virginius Island's decline and destruction ==
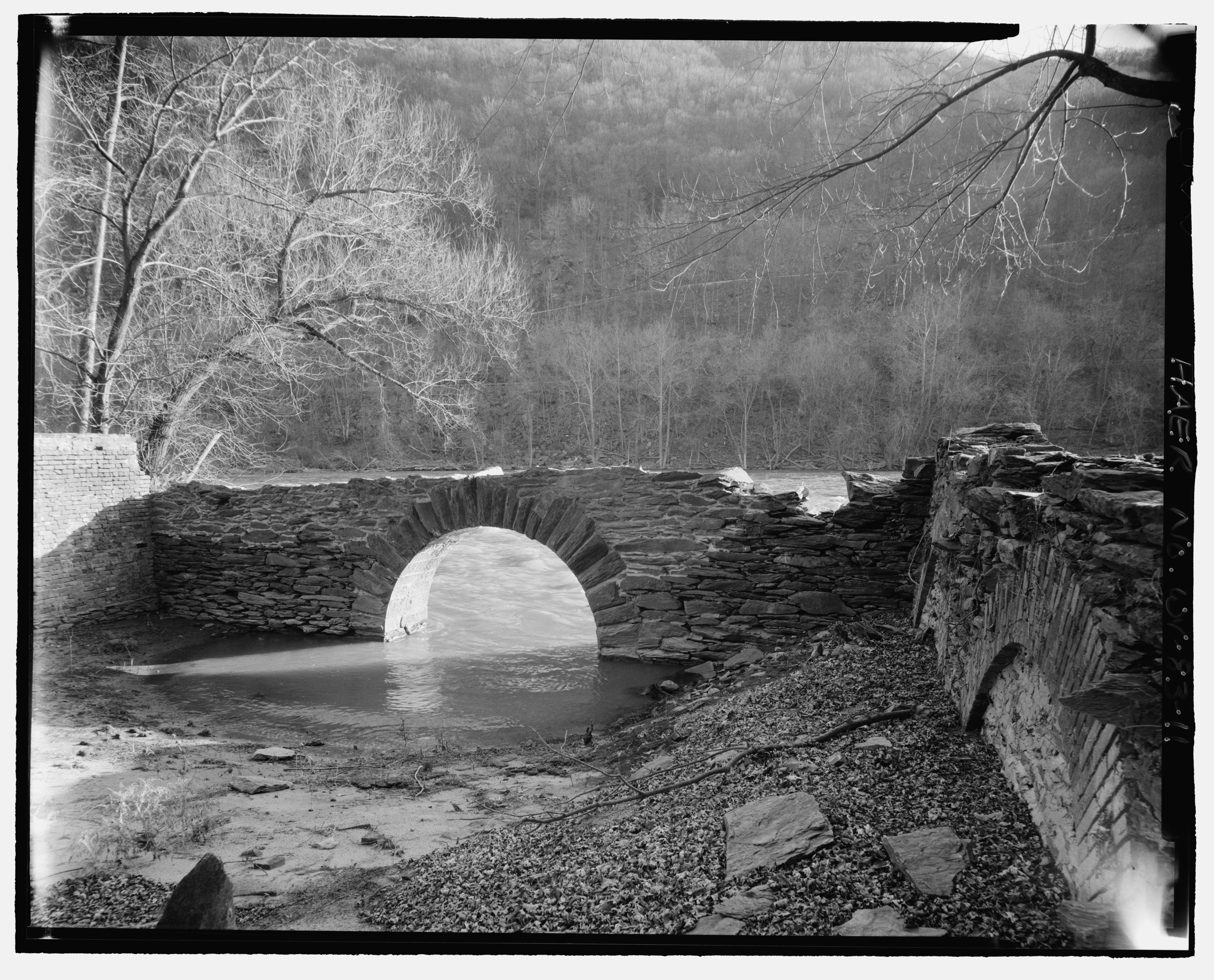
Inside the ruins of the cotton/flour mill.

Industry only partially recovered after the war. Manufacturers and potential manufacturers faced competition from new steam-powered industry, which could be built in locations without water power. The biggest enterprise during this period was a pulp mill. In 1936 the worst recorded flood swept through the Harpers Ferry area, and the remaining islanders fled, never to return. No structures on Virginius Island remained standing. Today, the ruins of its mills, foundries, factories, warehouses, and homes can be seen on walking tours. Some has been stabilized and signed by the National Park Service as part of Harpers Ferry National Historical Park. Flooding in 1996 caused the island to be closed to visitors until 2003. It has been said that now what one sees are not ruins but half-completed buildings, strong enough to resist further flooding.

Under the auspices of the National Park Service, the industrial and sociological history of Virginius Island have been studied in depth. Research has revealed the islanders' inadequate nutrition, high alcohol consumption, intestinal parasites. The materials for a study of the evolution of water-powered machinery are in the ruins.

== See also ==
- John H. Hall (gunsmith)
- List of islands of West Virginia
