= John H. Hall (gunsmith) =

American gunsmith (1781-1841)

John Hancoc Hall
- Born: January 4, 1781; Falmouth, District of Maine
- Died: February 26, 1841 (aged 60); Randolph County, Missouri, U.S.
- Occupations: Inventor, gunsmith

John Hancock Hall (January 4, 1781 – February 26, 1841) was the inventor of the M1819 Hall breech-loading rifle and a mass production innovator.

== Early life ==
Hall was born in 1781 in the town of Portland (then Falmouth) in the Massachusetts District of Maine. He worked in his father's tannery until setting up his own woodworking and boat building shop in 1810 where he tinkered with guns in his spare time. He had taken an interest in firearms during militia service and focused on increasing the rapidity of loading.

== Career ==
On May 21, 1811, Hall patented a single shot, breech-loading rifle in collusion with Washington, D.C. architect Dr. William Thornton. He began manufacturing his new rifles at the rate of 50 per year until the United States Army Ordnance Corps ordered 200 rifles in December 1814. He regretfully turned down the contract because he was unable to meet the Army delivery deadline of 1815. Hall recognized individually fitted parts as the factor slowing rifle production and adapted his breech-loading design to the “uniformity principle,” widely known as interchangeable parts. Hall proposed the concept of interchangeable parts to the Army in June 1816 and earned a contract for 1,000 of the "Model of 1819" Hall rifles from the War Department, with interchangeable parts being the chief condition. To fulfill it, Hall spent more than five years (and $150,000 of government funds) at Harpers Ferry Arsenal, where he occupied an old sawmill on a small island in the Shenandoah River called Virginius Island.

Hall's methods were novel for the time. Hall transferred water power through a system of leather belts and pulleys to power his machines with unusual pace, greater than 3,000 revolutions per minute with efficiency, while most artisans used hand cutters and files. Like his contemporary Simeon North, Hall began using this mill power to run machine tools and achieve the dimension controls necessary for interchangeable parts. He employed metal-cutting machines attached with cutters and saws in the place of the standard heavy labor, made from cast-iron frames to ensure structural integrity and minimize vibrations from the mill’s belts. These machine-cut surfaces would then be hand filed to ensure fit and interchangeability, verified by a gauging system Hall had designed.

=== M1819 Hall rifles ===
Hall's contract for 1,000 rifles was completed in 1825. When a three-man committee deployed by the US Ordnance Department to verify Hall’s process in fulfilling his rifle contract visited Harpers Ferry, they were floored by his results, and especially the machines. They lauded Hall’s “system, in the manufacture of small arms, [as] entirely novel,” and one which could yield “the most beneficial results to the Country, especially, if carried into effect on a large scale”.

A trial was devised to test the rate of fire of Hall's breech-loading rifles in comparison to muzzle-loading rifles and Army-issue muzzle-loading muskets. A company of 38 men were given 10 minutes to load and fire at targets 100 yards distant. The company scored 164 hits (35% of the 464 shots fired) with conventional muzzle-loading rifles and 208 hits (25% of the 845 shots fired) with the faster loading, but less accurate, army-issue smooth-bore muskets in comparison to 430 hits (36% of the 1198 shots fired) with Hall's rifles.

Hall's rifle works design worked so well as that it had to undergo only minimal changes through the end of the Model 1819’s run in 1853. By 1842, 23,500 rifles and 13,682 Hall-North carbines had been produced, most at Harper's Ferry, earning Hall nearly $40,000 in royalty and patent-licensing fees. Despite a significant increase in rate of fire over muzzle-loading rifles and muskets, Hall's rifle design suffered from a gas leak around the interface of the removable chamber and the bore, resulting in the necessity of a heavier powder charge that still produced much less muzzle velocity than its muzzle-loading competition. No serious efforts were made to develop a seal to reduce the loss of gas from the breech. The penetrating ability of its .52-caliber ball for the rifle was only one-third of that of the muzzle-loaders, and the muzzle velocity of the carbine was 25 percent lower than that of the Jenks carbine, despite having similar barrel lengths and identical 70-grain powder charges.

Hall worked at Harper's Ferry until 1840 and died February 26, 1841, in Randolph County, Missouri.

== Legacy ==
Hall's cutting machines were designed for simplicity, to the point that “activity [was] more necessary than judgment” and young boys or “common hands” could successfully run them. They both “functioned without any manual guidance but evidently ceased operation once the workpiece had been finished,” allowing the worker to operate several at once. Hall himself even claimed “one boy by the aid of these machines can perform more work than ten men with files, in the same time, and with greater accuracy”.

Hall's innovations in construction, tools, controls, stops, and gauges all were advances in milling iron and machine tools. Together with Simeon North and other armorers, Hall contributed to the adoption of interchangeable parts and the American System as a whole.

The men who had learned Hall's methods of interchangeable parts while working at Harper's Ferry went on to apply those methods to production of shoes, watches, clocks, bicycles, clothing, rubber goods, and, later, automobiles. Hall's methods transformed the United States from an economy of workshop craftsmen to a nation of industrialized mass production.
