= John Small (gunsmith) =

American gunsmith (1759–1821)

John Small (1759 – 1821) was an American gunsmith, frontiersman, soldier, and public official. An Irish immigrant to Pennsylvania, he served in the American Revolutionary War. After the war, he served as sheriff of Knox County, Indiana, as a territorial legislator, and as Indiana Territory's first Adjutant General.

== Biography ==
Small immigrated to Pennsylvania with his family and began an apprenticeship as a gunsmith. He served as an armorer during Lord Dunmore's War. During the American Revolutionary War, he served as a private in the Washington County, Pennsylvania militia. He apprenticed with Richard Butler and William Butler while at Fort Pitt.

After the war, in 1785, Small relocated to Vincennes, Indiana. He became an officer in the local militia, and participated in the 1786 Battle of the Embarras River. Small also corresponded with George Rogers Clark that same year, and petitioned for military aid from Kentucky.

Small worked as a gunsmith, merchant, and tavern owner. He was appointed sheriff on 4 July 1790, and the tavern was used as the first Knox County Courthouse. Small was a representative for Knox County to the Northwest Territory Legislature in 1799. In 1800, Small was appointed as Indiana Territory's first adjutant general under territorial Governor William Henry Harrison, and given the rank of lieutenant colonel. He held this office for over a decade, including the Battle of Tippecanoe, but stepped down with Governor Harrison during the War of 1812.

John Small's tavern temporarily housed the Indiana Territorial Legislature in 1813.

== Rifles and tomahawks ==
- The Indiana State Museum houses a John Small flintlock rifle owned by James Girty (1743–1817), and another believed to be owned by Francis Vigo. The state museum collection also includes a tomahawk pipe made by John Small.
- One of Small's rifles is on display at William Henry Harrison's territorial governor's home, Grouseland. This "Grouseland Rifle" was later converted to a percussion cap, and was designated as the official state rifle of Indiana.
- It is believed that William Clark carried a John Small rifle during his expedition to the Pacific. This rifle is currently owned by the Missouri State Museum.
- The Smithsonian Institution has a tomahawk owned by Henry Knox which has been attributed to John Small.
