= Monica Church =

American politician

Member of the Idaho House of Representatives from the 19th A district
- Incumbent
- Assumed office November 30, 2024
- Preceded by: Lauren Necochea

Personal details
- Born: Boise, Idaho, U.S.
- Party: Democratic
- Spouse: Chad
- Children: 1
- Relatives: Cecil Andrus (grandfather); Bethine Church (grandmother); Frank Church (grandfather); Chase Clark (great-grandfather)
- Education: Whitman College (BA); Boise State University (BA, MSEd)

Monica Carol Church is an American politician who serves in the Idaho House of Representatives from seat A of the 19th district as a member of the Democratic Party.

== Early life and education ==
Monica Carol Church was born in Boise, Idaho. She is the granddaughter of Cecil Andrus and Frank Church. She married Chad, with whom she had one child.

Church graduated from Timberline High School in 2000. She graduated from Whitman College with a Bachelor of Arts in Philosophy and Cultural Anthropology and Boise State University with a Master of Education in education leadership and administration, a Bachelor of Arts in social studies secondary education, and a Bachelor of Arts in history.

== Career ==
Church was a member of Idaho's delegation to the U.S. Global Leadership Coalition.

In 2024, Lauren Necochea declined to seek reelection to the Idaho House of Representatives in order to focus on being chair of the Idaho Democratic Party. Church won the Democratic nomination without opposition and defeated Republican nominee Jim Feederle in the general election.

During Church's tenure in the state house she served on the Education, Local Government, and Resources and Conservation committees.

== Electoral history ==
2024 Idaho House of Representatives 19A district election
Primary election
Party	Candidate	Votes	%
Democratic	Monica Church	2,236	100.00%
Total votes		2,236	100.00%
General election
Democratic	Monica Church	20,947	65.57%
Republican	Jim Feederle	10,997	34.43%
Total votes		31,944	100.00%

== Works cited ==
- "Democratic Election Results". Secretary of State of Idaho. June 18, 2024.
- "Legislative Results". Secretary of State of Idaho.
- "Monica Carol Church". Boise State University. Archived from the original on January 23, 2025.
- "Rep. Monica Church". Idaho House of Representatives. Archived from the original on January 23, 2025.
- "Timerline High graduates". Idaho Statesman. June 2, 2000. p. 10B – via Newspapers.com.
- Stevenson, Ian (May 24, 2024). "Idaho Senate leader's upset loss is part of shift at Capitol. How much did far right gain?". Idaho Statesman. p. 4A – via Newspapers.com.
