= 2022 Idaho Senate election =

2022 Idaho State Senate election
- November 8, 2022

All 35 seats in the Idaho Senate 18 seats needed for a majority
	Majority party	Minority party
Leader	Kelly Anthon	Michelle Stennett (retired)
Party	Republican	Democratic
Leader's seat	27th District	26th district
Seats before	28	7
Seats after	28	7
Seat change	Steady	Steady
Popular vote	400,702	103,634
Percentage	76.90%	19.89%
Swing	▲16.68%	▼13.85%
- Results: Republican gain Democratic gain Republican hold Democratic hold
Majority Leader before election
Kelly Anthon
Republican
Elected Majority Leader
Kelly Anthon
Republican

The 2022 Idaho State Senate elections took place on November 8, 2022. Primary elections were held on May 17, 2022. Idaho voters elected state senators in all 35 seats of the Senate, electing one state senator and two state representatives in each of the 35 Idaho state legislative districts. State senators serve two-year terms in the Idaho Senate.

The election coincided with United States national elections and Idaho state elections, including U.S. Senate, U.S. House, Governor, and Idaho House. Since the previous election in 2020, Republicans held a 28-to-7-seat supermajority over Democrats. Republicans maintained the same supermajority in 2022, winning 28 seats.

These were the first elections in Idaho following the 2020 United States redistricting cycle, which resulted in some members being assigned to new districts.

== Retirements ==
=== Republicans ===
1. District 2: Steve Bair: Retired
2. District 4: Mary Souza: Retired to run for Secretary of State
3. District 6: Dan G. Johnson: Retired
4. District 11: Patti Anne Lodge: Retired
5. District 21: Regina Bayer: Retired
6. District 23: Christy Zito: Retired
7. District 24: Lee Heider: Retired

=== Democrats ===
1. District 16: Grant Burgoyne: Retired
2. District 27: Michelle Stennett: Retired
3. District 29: Mark Nye: Retired

== Incumbents defeated in primary ==
=== Republicans ===
1. District 1: Jim Woodward was defeated by Scott Herndon.
2. District 5: Peter Riggs was defeated by Carl Bjerke.
3. District 7: Carl Crabtree was defeated by Cindy Carlson.
4. District 13: Jeff Agenbroad was defeated by Brian Lenney.
5. District 14: Steven Thayn was defeated by fellow incumbent C. Scott Grow in a redistricting race.
6. District 15: Fred Martin was defeated by Codi Galloway.
7. District 24: Jim Patrick was defeated by Glenneda Zuiderveld.

== Predictions ==
Source	Ranking	As of
Sabato's Crystal Ball	Safe R	May 19, 2022

== Results summary ==
Summary of the November 8, 2022 Idaho Senate election results
Party	Candidates	Votes		Seats				
Party	Candidates	No.	%	Before	Up	Won	After	+/–
Republican	35	400,702	76.90%	28	28	28	28	Steady
Democratic	13	103,634	19.89%	7	7	7	7	Steady
Constitution	6	8,765	1.68%	0	0	0	0	Steady
Independent	2	4,926	0.95%	0	0	0	0	Steady
Libertarian	2	3,011	0.58%	0	0	0	0	Steady
Total		521,038	100.00%	35	35	35	35	Steady
Source: Idaho Elections Results

== Close races ==
District	Winner	Margin
District 15	Democratic	1.77%
District 6	Republican	2.1%
District 26	Democratic	3.26%
District 16	Republican	19.18%
District 17	Republican	19.56%

== Summary of results by State Senate district ==
Italics denote an open seat held by the incumbent party; bold text denotes a gain for a party.

Senate district	Incumbent	Party	Elected Senator	Party
1	Jim Woodward	Rep	Scott Herndon	Rep
2	Steve Vick	Rep	Phil Hart	Rep
3	Peter Riggs (Note: Redistricted from District 2 to District 5 and lost re-election.)	Rep	Doug Okuniewicz	Rep
4	Mary Souza	Rep	Ben Toews	Rep
5	David Nelson (Note: Redistricted from District 5 to District 6 and lost re-election.)	Dem	**Carl Bjerke**	**Rep**
6	Robert Blair (Note: Blair was serving as a full-time substitute for state Sen. Dan G. Johnson (R) at the time of the primary and should be considered as an incumbent seeking re-election.)	Rep	Dan Foreman	Rep
7	Carl Crabtree	Rep	Cindy Carlson	Rep
8	Steven Thayn (Note: Redistricted from District 8 to District 14 and lost re-election.)	Rep	Geoff Schroeder	Rep
9	Abby Lee	Rep	Abby Lee	Rep
10	Jim Rice (Note: Redistricted from District 10 to District 9 and lost re-election.)	Rep	Tammy Nichols	Rep
11	Patti Anne Lodge	Rep	Chris Trakel	Rep
12	Todd Lakey (Note: Redistricted from District 12 to District 23.)	Rep	Ben Adams	Rep
13	Jeff Agenbroad	Rep	Brian Lenney	Rep
14	C. Scott Grow	Rep	C. Scott Grow	Rep
15	Fred Martin	Rep	**Rick Just**	**Dem**
16	Grant Burgoyne	Dem	Alison Rabe (Note: Senator Carrie Semmelroth was appointed to the 17th district seat in Nov. 2021 after the departure of Senator Alison "Ali" Rabe. Sen. Rabe moved out of the 17th district and vacated the seat; however, Rabe was elected back to the chamber from the neighboring 16th district in Nov. 2022.)	Dem
17	Carrie Semmelroth (Note: Senator Carrie Semmelroth was appointed to the seat after the departure of Senator Alison "Ali" Rabe. Sen. Rabe moved out of the district and vacated the seat; however, Rabe was elected back to the chamber from the neighboring 16th district in Nov. 2022.)	Dem	Carrie Semmelroth	Dem
18	Janie Ward-Engelking	Dem	Janie Ward-Engelking	Dem
19	Melissa Wintrow	Dem	Melissa Wintrow	Dem
20	Chuck Winder	Rep	Chuck Winder	Rep
21	Regina Bayer	Rep	Treg Bernt	Rep
22	Lori Den Hartog	Rep	Lori Den Hartog	Rep
23	Christy Zito	Rep	Todd Lakey	Rep
24	Lee Heider	Rep	Glenneda Zuiderveld	Rep
25	Jim Patrick (Note: Redistricted from District 25 to District 24 and lost re-election.)	Rep	Linda Wright Hartgen	Rep
26	Michelle Stennett	Dem	Ron Taylor	Dem
27	Kelly Anthon	Rep	Kelly Anthon	Rep
28	Jim Guthrie	Rep	Jim Guthrie	Rep
29	Mark Nye	Dem	James Ruchti	Dem
30	Kevin Cook (Note: Redistricted from District 30 to District 32.)	Rep	Julie VanOrden (Note: VanOrden was serving as a full-time substitute for state Sen. Steve Bair (R) in the 31st district at the time of the primary and should be considered as an incumbent seeking re-election. She was redistricted from District 31 to District 30.)	Rep
31	Julie VanOrden	Rep	Van Burtenshaw (Note: Redistricted from District 35 to District 31.)	Rep
32	Mark Harris (Note: Redistricted from District 32 to District 35.)	Rep	Kevin Cook	Rep
33	Dave Lent	Rep	Dave Lent	Rep
34	Doug Ricks	Rep	Doug Ricks	Rep
35	Van Burtenshaw	Rep	Mark Harris	Rep

== Detailed Results by Senate District ==
Sources for election results:

=== District 1 ===
Idaho Legislative District 1 Senate Republican Primary Election, 2022
Party	Candidate	Votes	%
Idaho Republican Party	Scott Herndon	7,771	56.17%
Idaho Republican Party	Jim Woodward (incumbent)	6,064	43.83%
Total votes		13,835	100.00%

Idaho Legislative District 1 Senate General Election, 2022
Party	Candidate	Votes	%
Idaho Republican Party	Scott Herndon	13,064	100.00%
Total votes		13,064	100.00%
Idaho Republican Party hold			

=== District 2 ===
Idaho Legislative District 2 Senate Republican Primary Election, 2022
Party	Candidate	Votes	%
Idaho Republican Party	Phil Hart	5,186	57.11%
Idaho Republican Party	Bill Hasz	2,416	26.61%
Idaho Republican Party	Jon Cantamessa	1,478	16.28%
Total votes		9,080	100.00%

Idaho Legislative District 2 Senate General Election, 2022
Party	Candidate	Votes	%
Idaho Republican Party	Phil Hart	16,770	100.00%
Total votes		16,770	100.00%
Idaho Republican Party hold			

=== District 3 ===
Idaho Legislative District 3 Senate Republican Primary Election, 2022
Party	Candidate	Votes	%
Idaho Republican Party	Doug "Doug O" Okuniewicz	9,550	100.00%
Total votes		9,550	100.00%

Idaho Legislative District 3 Senate General Election, 2022
Party	Candidate	Votes	%
Idaho Republican Party	Doug "Doug O" Okuniewicz	17,365	100.00%
Total votes		17,365	100.00%
Idaho Republican Party hold			

=== District 4 ===
Idaho Legislative District 4 Senate Republican Primary Election, 2022
Party	Candidate	Votes	%
Idaho Republican Party	Ben Toews	4,702	59.69%
Idaho Republican Party	Tara Malek	3,176	40.31%
Total votes		7,878	100.00%

Idaho Legislative District 4 Senate General Election, 2022
Party	Candidate	Votes	%
Idaho Republican Party	Ben Toews	12,332	100.00%
Total votes		12,332	100.00%
Idaho Republican Party hold			

=== District 5 ===
Idaho Legislative District 5 Senate Republican Primary Election, 2022
Party	Candidate	Votes	%
Idaho Republican Party	Carl Bjerke	5,162	62.09%
Idaho Republican Party	Peter Riggs (incumbent)	3,152	37.91%
Total votes		8,314	100.00%

Idaho Legislative District 5 Senate General Election, 2022
Party	Candidate	Votes	%
Idaho Republican Party	Carl Bjerke	14,586	100.00%
Total votes		14,586	100.00%
Idaho Republican Party gain from Democratic			

=== District 6 ===
Idaho Legislative District 6 Senate Republican Primary Election, 2022
Party	Candidate	Votes	%
Idaho Republican Party	Dan Foreman	2,792	43.19%
Idaho Republican Party	Robert Blair (incumbent)	2,282	35.30%
Idaho Republican Party	Jen Seegmiller	1,391	21.52%
Total votes		6,465	100.00%

Idaho Legislative District 6 Senate Democratic Primary Election, 2022
Party	Candidate	Votes	%
Democratic	David Nelson (incumbent)	1,828	100.00%
Total votes		1,828	100.00%

Idaho Legislative District 6 Senate Constitution Primary Election, 2022
Party	Candidate	Votes	%
Constitution	James Hartley	17	100.00%
Total votes		17	100.00%

Idaho Legislative District 6 Senate General Election, 2022
Party	Candidate	Votes	%
Idaho Republican Party	Dan Foreman	10,174	50.07%
Democratic	David Nelson (incumbent)	9,746	47.97%
Constitution	James Hartley	398	1.96%
Total votes		20,318	100.00%
Idaho Republican Party hold			

=== District 7 ===
Idaho Legislative District 7 Senate Republican Primary Election, 2022
Party	Candidate	Votes	%
Idaho Republican Party	Cindy Carlson	4,306	48.89%
Idaho Republican Party	Carl Crabtree (incumbent)	3,525	40.02%
Idaho Republican Party	Keith Stuffle	538	6.11%
Idaho Republican Party	Heather Rogers	439	4.98%
Total votes		8,808	100.00%

Idaho Legislative District 7 Senate General Election, 2022
Party	Candidate	Votes	%
Idaho Republican Party	Cindy Carlson	15,685	100.00%
Total votes		15,685	100.00%
Idaho Republican Party hold			

=== District 8 ===
Idaho Legislative District 8 Senate Republican Primary Election, 2022
Party	Candidate	Votes	%
Idaho Republican Party	Geoff Schroeder	2,805	32.37%
Idaho Republican Party	Terry Gestrin	2,389	27.57%
Idaho Republican Party	Jon Krueger	2,231	25.75%
Idaho Republican Party	Gary E. Freeman	1,240	14.31%
Total votes		8,665	100.00%

Idaho Legislative District 8 Senate General Election, 2022
Party	Candidate	Votes	%
Idaho Republican Party	Geoff Schroeder	13,776	100.00%
Total votes		13,776	100.00%
Idaho Republican Party hold			

=== District 9 ===
Idaho Legislative District 9 Senate Republican Primary Election, 2022
Party	Candidate	Votes	%
Idaho Republican Party	Abby Lee (incumbent)	3,243	34.90%
Idaho Republican Party	Jordan Marques	2,752	29.62%
Idaho Republican Party	Jim Rice (incumbent)	2,265	24.38%
Idaho Republican Party	Kayla Dunn	1,032	11.11%
Total votes		9,292	100.00%

Idaho Legislative District 9 Senate General Election, 2022
Party	Candidate	Votes	%
Idaho Republican Party	Abby Lee (incumbent)	14,478	100.00%
Total votes		14,478	100.00%
Idaho Republican Party hold			

=== District 10 ===
Idaho Legislative District 10 Senate Republican Primary Election, 2022
Party	Candidate	Votes	%
Idaho Republican Party	Tammy Nichols	5,262	58.43%
Idaho Republican Party	Scott R. Brock	3,743	41.57%
Total votes		9,005	100.00%

Idaho Legislative District 10 Senate Democratic Primary Election, 2022
Party	Candidate	Votes	%
Democratic	Bob Solomon	594	100.00%
Total votes		594	100.00%

Idaho Legislative District 10 Senate General Election, 2022
Party	Candidate	Votes	%
Idaho Republican Party	Tammy Nichols	15,354	77.22%
Democratic	Bob Solomon	4,530	22.78%
Total votes		19,884	100.00%
Idaho Republican Party hold			

=== District 11 ===
Idaho Legislative District 11 Senate Republican Primary Election, 2022
Party	Candidate	Votes	%
Idaho Republican Party	Chris Trakel	1,908	53.75%
Idaho Republican Party	Greg Chaney	1,642	46.25%
Total votes		3,550	100.00%

Idaho Legislative District 11 Senate Democratic Primary Election, 2022
Party	Candidate	Votes	%
Democratic	Toni Ferro	536	100.00%
Total votes		536	100.00%

Idaho Legislative District 11 Senate Constitution Primary Election, 2022
Party	Candidate	Votes	%
Constitution	Kurtis Berger (Note: Despite winning the Constitution Party primary, Berger was withdrawn on 9/7/2022 and no replacement from the Constitution Party appeared on the general election ballot.)	15	100.00%
Total votes		15	100.00%

Idaho Legislative District 11 Senate General Election, 2022
Party	Candidate	Votes	%
Idaho Republican Party	Chris Trakel	6,187	63.78%
Democratic	Toni Ferro	3,513	36.22%
Total votes		9,700	100.00%
Idaho Republican Party hold			

=== District 12 ===
Idaho Legislative District 12 Senate Republican Primary Election, 2022
Party	Candidate	Votes	%
Idaho Republican Party	Ben Adams	4,412	81.69%
Idaho Republican Party	Thomas Netzley	989	18.31%
Total votes		5,401	100.00%

Idaho Legislative District 12 Senate General Election, 2022
Party	Candidate	Votes	%
Idaho Republican Party	Ben Adams	10,044	100.00%
Total votes		10,044	100.00%
Idaho Republican Party hold			

=== District 13 ===
Idaho Legislative District 13 Senate Republican Primary Election, 2022
Party	Candidate	Votes	%
Idaho Republican Party	Brian Lenney	3,162	57.57%
Idaho Republican Party	Jeff Agenbroad (incumbent)	2,330	42.43%
Total votes		5,492	100.00%

Idaho Legislative District 13 Senate General Election, 2022
Party	Candidate	Votes	%
Idaho Republican Party	Brian Lenney	10,091	100.00%
Total votes		10,091	100.00%
Idaho Republican Party hold			

=== District 14 ===
Idaho Legislative District 14 Senate Republican Primary Election, 2022
Party	Candidate	Votes	%
Idaho Republican Party	C. Scott Grow (incumbent)	6,038	47.77%
Idaho Republican Party	Steven Thayn (incumbent)	5,092	40.29%
Idaho Republican Party	Katie Donahue	1,509	11.94%
Total votes		12,639	100.00%

Idaho Legislative District 14 Senate Libertarian Primary Election, 2022
Party	Candidate	Votes	%
Libertarian	Robert Imhoff	28	100.00%
Total votes		28	100.00%

Idaho Legislative District 14 Senate Constitution Primary Election, 2022
Party	Candidate	Votes	%
Constitution	Kirsten Faith Richardson	18	100.00%
Total votes		18	100.00%

Idaho Legislative District 14 Senate General Election, 2022
Party	Candidate	Votes	%
Idaho Republican Party	C. Scott Grow (incumbent)	18,502	81.18%
Libertarian	Robert Imhoff	2,356	10.34%
Constitution	Kirsten Faith Richardson	1,934	8.49%
Total votes		22,792	100.00%
Idaho Republican Party hold			

=== District 15 ===
Idaho Legislative District 15 Senate Republican Primary Election, 2022
Party	Candidate	Votes	%
Idaho Republican Party	Codi Galloway	3,668	53.01%
Idaho Republican Party	Fred S. Martin (incumbent)	2,853	41.23%
Idaho Republican Party	Dorothy Greenzang	398	5.75%
Total votes		6,919	100.00%

Idaho Legislative District 15 Senate Democratic Primary Election, 2022
Party	Candidate	Votes	%
Democratic	Rick Just	1,498	100.00%
Total votes		1,498	100.00%

Idaho Legislative District 15 Senate Constitution Primary Election, 2022
Party	Candidate	Votes	%
Constitution	Sarah A. Clendenon	10	100.00%
Total votes		10	100.00%

Idaho Legislative District 15 Senate General Election, 2022
Party	Candidate	Votes	%
Democratic	Rick Just	9,193	49.77%
Idaho Republican Party	Codi Galloway	8,866	48.00%
Constitution	Sarah A. Clendenon	413	2.24%
Total votes		18,472	100.00%
Democratic gain from Idaho Republican Party			

=== District 16 ===
Idaho Legislative District 16 Senate Democratic Primary Election, 2022
Party	Candidate	Votes	%
Democratic	Alison Rabe	1,815	100.00%
Total votes		1,815	100.00%

Idaho Legislative District 16 Senate Republican Primary Election, 2022
Party	Candidate	Votes	%
Idaho Republican Party	Dennis Mansfield	3,882	100.00%
Total votes		3,882	100.00%

Idaho Legislative District 16 Senate General Election, 2022
Party	Candidate	Votes	%
Democratic	Alison Rabe	10,526	59.51%
Idaho Republican Party	Dennis Mansfield	7,163	40.49%
Total votes		17,689	100.00%
Democratic hold			

=== District 17 ===
Idaho Legislative District 17 Senate Democratic Primary Election, 2022
Party	Candidate	Votes	%
Democratic	Carrie Semmelroth (incumbent)	1,704	100.00%
Total votes		1,704	100.00%

Idaho Legislative District 17 Senate Republican Primary Election, 2022
Party	Candidate	Votes	%
Idaho Republican Party	Benjamin Donovan Chafetz	3,549	100.00%
Total votes		3,549	100.00%

Idaho Legislative District 17 Senate General Election, 2022
Party	Candidate	Votes	%
Democratic	Carrie Semmelroth (incumbent)	10,094	59.78%
Idaho Republican Party	Benjamin Donovan Chafetz	6,790	40.22%
Total votes		16,884	100.00%
Democratic hold			

=== District 18 ===
Idaho Legislative District 18 Senate Democratic Primary Election, 2022
Party	Candidate	Votes	%
Democratic	Janie Ward-Engelking (incumbent)	1,883	100.00%
Total votes		1,883	100.00%

Idaho Legislative District 18 Senate Republican Primary Election, 2022
Party	Candidate	Votes	%
Idaho Republican Party	Dan Bridges	3,706	100.00%
Total votes		3,706	100.00%

Idaho Legislative District 18 Senate General Election, 2022
Party	Candidate	Votes	%
Democratic	Janie Ward-Engelking (incumbent)	12,040	66.06%
Idaho Republican Party	Dan Bridges	6,187	33.94%
Total votes		18,227	100.00%
Democratic hold			

=== District 19 ===
Idaho Legislative District 19 Senate Democratic Primary Election, 2022
Party	Candidate	Votes	%
Democratic	Melissa Wintrow (incumbent)	2,746	100.00%
Total votes		2,746	100.00%

Idaho Legislative District 19 Senate Republican Primary Election, 2022
Party	Candidate	Votes	%
Idaho Republican Party	Blair Moss	4,759	100.00%
Total votes		4,759	100.00%

Idaho Legislative District 19 Senate General Election, 2022
Party	Candidate	Votes	%
Democratic	Melissa Wintrow (incumbent)	16,862	68.15%
Idaho Republican Party	Blair Moss	7,881	31.85%
Total votes		24,743	100.00%
Democratic hold			

=== District 20 ===
Idaho Legislative District 20 Senate Republican Primary Election, 2022
Party	Candidate	Votes	%
Idaho Republican Party	Chuck Winder (incumbent)	4,397	53.92%
Idaho Republican Party	Rosa Martinez	3,758	46.08%
Total votes		8,155	100.00%

Idaho Legislative District 20 Senate General Election, 2022
Party	Candidate	Votes	%
Idaho Republican Party	Chuck Winder (incumbent)	13,709	100.00%
Total votes		13,709	100.00%
Idaho Republican Party hold			

=== District 21 ===
Idaho Legislative District 21 Senate Republican Primary Election, 2022
Party	Candidate	Votes	%
Idaho Republican Party	Treg A. Bernt	4,467	61.27%
Idaho Republican Party	Thad Butterworth	2,824	38.73%
Total votes		7,291	100.00%

Idaho Legislative District 21 Senate Constitution Primary Election, 2022
Party	Candidate	Votes	%
Constitution	Monica McKinley	10	100.00%
Total votes		10	100.00%

Idaho Legislative District 21 Senate General Election, 2022
Party	Candidate	Votes	%
Idaho Republican Party	Treg A. Bernt	12,861	83.13%
Constitution	Monica McKinley	2,610	16.87%
Total votes		15,471	100.00%
Idaho Republican Party hold			

=== District 22 ===
Idaho Legislative District 22 Senate Republican Primary Election, 2022
Party	Candidate	Votes	%
Idaho Republican Party	Lori Den Hartog (incumbent)	5,882	100.00%
Total votes		5,882	100.00%

Idaho Legislative District 22 Senate Democratic Primary Election, 2022
Party	Candidate	Votes	%
Democratic	Pat Soulliere	1,005	100.00%
Total votes		1,005	100.00%

Idaho Legislative District 22 Senate Constitution Primary Election, 2022
Party	Candidate	Votes	%
Constitution	Brendan J. Gomez	9	100.00%
Total votes		9	100.00%

Idaho Legislative District 22 Senate General Election, 2022
Party	Candidate	Votes	%
Idaho Republican Party	Lori Den Hartog (incumbent)	12,337	63.74%
Democratic	Pat Soulliere	6,324	32.67%
Constitution	Brendan J. Gomez	694	3.59%
Total votes		19,355	100.00%
Idaho Republican Party hold			

=== District 23 ===
Idaho Legislative District 23 Senate Republican Primary Election, 2022
Party	Candidate	Votes	%
Idaho Republican Party	Todd Lakey (incumbent)	4,145	61.49%
Idaho Republican Party	Steve Allmer	2,596	38.51%
Total votes		6,741	100.00%

Idaho Legislative District 23 Senate Democratic Primary Election, 2022
Party	Candidate	Votes	%
Democratic	Mik Lose	460	100.00%
Total votes		460	100.00%

Idaho Legislative District 23 Senate Libertarian Primary Election, 2022
Party	Candidate	Votes	%
Libertarian	Jon Basabe	22	100.00%
Total votes		22	100.00%

Idaho Legislative District 23 Senate General Election, 2022
Party	Candidate	Votes	%
Idaho Republican Party	Todd Lakey (incumbent)	12,327	78.18%
Democratic	Mik Lose	2,786	17.67%
Libertarian	Jon Basabe	655	4.15%
Total votes		15,768	100.00%
Idaho Republican Party hold			

=== District 24 ===
Idaho Legislative District 24 Senate Republican Primary Election, 2022
Party	Candidate	Votes	%
Idaho Republican Party	Glenneda Zuiderveld	3,943	50.24%
Idaho Republican Party	Jim Patrick (incumbent)	3,906	49.76%
Total votes		7,849	100.00%

Idaho Legislative District 24 Senate General Election, 2022
Party	Candidate	Votes	%
Idaho Republican Party	Glenneda Zuiderveld	13,144	100.00%
Total votes		13,144	100.00%
Idaho Republican Party hold			

=== District 25 ===
Idaho Legislative District 25 Senate Republican Primary Election, 2022
Party	Candidate	Votes	%
Idaho Republican Party	Linda Wright Hartgen	4,065	100.00%
Total votes		4,065	100.00%

Idaho Legislative District 25 Senate Constitution Primary Election, 2022
Party	Candidate	Votes	%
Constitution	Paul Thompson	10	100.00%
Total votes		10	100.00%

Idaho Legislative District 25 Senate General Election, 2022
Party	Candidate	Votes	%
Idaho Republican Party	Linda Wright Hartgen	8,213	75.15%
Constitution	Paul Thompson	2,716	24.85%
Total votes		10,929	100.00%
Idaho Republican Party hold			

=== District 26 ===
Idaho Legislative District 26 Senate Democratic Primary Election, 2022
Party	Candidate	Votes	%
Democratic	Ron C. Taylor	2,140	100.00%
Total votes		2,140	100.00%

Idaho Legislative District 26 Senate Republican Primary Election, 2022
Party	Candidate	Votes	%
Idaho Republican Party	Laurie Lickley	3,343	63.09%
Idaho Republican Party	Eric Parker	1,956	36.91%
Total votes		5,299	100.00%

Idaho Legislative District 26 Senate General Election, 2022
Party	Candidate	Votes	%
Democratic	Ron C. Taylor	8,117	51.63%
Idaho Republican Party	Laurie Lickley	7,604	48.37%
Total votes		15,721	100.00%
Democratic hold			

=== District 27 ===
Idaho Legislative District 27 Senate Republican Primary Election, 2022
Party	Candidate	Votes	%
Idaho Republican Party	Kelly Anthon (incumbent)	6,212	73.82%
Idaho Republican Party	Jeanie Hakes	2,203	26.18%
Total votes		8,415	100.00%

Idaho Legislative District 27 Senate General Election, 2022
Party	Candidate	Votes	%
Idaho Republican Party	Kelly Anthon (incumbent)	10,650	89.03%
Independent	Bill Drury	1,312	10.97%
Total votes		11,962	100.00%
Idaho Republican Party hold			

=== District 28 ===
Idaho Legislative District 28 Senate Republican Primary Election, 2022
Party	Candidate	Votes	%
Idaho Republican Party	Jim Guthrie (incumbent)	4,036	56.65%
Idaho Republican Party	Art da Rosa	1,812	25.44%
Idaho Republican Party	Tom Branson	1,276	17.91%
Total votes		7,124	100.00%

Idaho Legislative District 28 Senate General Election, 2022
Party	Candidate	Votes	%
Idaho Republican Party	Jim Guthrie (incumbent)	11,441	75.99%
Independent	Mike Saville	3,614	24.01%
Total votes		15,055	100.00%
Idaho Republican Party hold			

=== District 29 ===
Idaho Legislative District 29 Senate Democratic Primary Election, 2022
Party	Candidate	Votes	%
Democratic	James D. Ruchti	1,377	100.00%
Total votes		1,377	100.00%

Idaho Legislative District 29 Senate Republican Primary Election, 2022
Party	Candidate	Votes	%
Idaho Republican Party	David T. Worley	3,903	100.00%
Total votes		3,903	100.00%

Idaho Legislative District 29 Senate General Election, 2022
Party	Candidate	Votes	%
Democratic	James D. Ruchti	7,863	54.07%
Idaho Republican Party	David T. Worley	6,678	45.93%
Total votes		14,541	100.00%
Democratic hold			

=== District 30 ===
Idaho Legislative District 30 Senate Republican Primary Election, 2022
Party	Candidate	Votes	%
Idaho Republican Party	Julie VanOrden (incumbent)	4,518	57.92%
Idaho Republican Party	Jerry D. Bingham	3,283	42.08%
Total votes		7,801	100.00%

Idaho Legislative District 30 Senate Democratic Primary Election, 2022
Party	Candidate	Votes	%
Democratic	Dave Archuleta	309	100.00%
Total votes		309	100.00%

Idaho Legislative District 30 Senate General Election, 2022
Party	Candidate	Votes	%
Idaho Republican Party	Julie VanOrden (incumbent)	10,948	84.29%
Democratic	Dave Archuleta	2,040	15.71%
Total votes		12,988	100.00%
Idaho Republican Party hold			

=== District 31 ===
Idaho Legislative District 31 Senate Republican Primary Election, 2022
Party	Candidate	Votes	%
Idaho Republican Party	Van Burtenshaw (incumbent)	7,217	68.56%
Idaho Republican Party	Fran Bryson	3,310	31.44%
Total votes		10,527	100.00%

Idaho Legislative District 31 Senate General Election, 2022
Party	Candidate	Votes	%
Idaho Republican Party	Van Burtenshaw (incumbent)	15,391	100.00%
Total votes		15,391	100.00%
Idaho Republican Party hold			

=== District 32 ===
Idaho Legislative District 32 Senate Republican Primary Election, 2022
Party	Candidate	Votes	%
Idaho Republican Party	Kevin Cook (incumbent)	5,200	74.84%
Idaho Republican Party	Keith Newberry	1,748	25.16%
Total votes		6,948	100.00%

Idaho Legislative District 32 Senate General Election, 2022
Party	Candidate	Votes	%
Idaho Republican Party	Kevin Cook (incumbent)	10,736	100.00%
Total votes		10,736	100.00%
Idaho Republican Party hold			

=== District 33 ===
Idaho Legislative District 33 Senate Republican Primary Election, 2022
Party	Candidate	Votes	%
Idaho Republican Party	Dave Lent (incumbent)	3,627	67.86%
Idaho Republican Party	Bryan Scholz	1,718	32.14%
Total votes		5,345	100.00%

Idaho Legislative District 33 Senate General Election, 2022
Party	Candidate	Votes	%
Idaho Republican Party	Dave Lent (incumbent)	8,605	100.00%
Total votes		8,605	100.00%
Idaho Republican Party hold			

=== District 34 ===
Idaho Legislative District 34 Senate Republican Primary Election, 2022
Party	Candidate	Votes	%
Idaho Republican Party	Doug Ricks (incumbent)	4,517	100.00%
Total votes		4,517	100.00%

Idaho Legislative District 34 Senate General Election, 2022
Party	Candidate	Votes	%
Idaho Republican Party	Doug Ricks (incumbent)	7,366	100.00%
Total votes		7,366	100.00%
Idaho Republican Party hold			

=== District 35 ===
Idaho Legislative District 35 Senate Republican Primary Election, 2022
Party	Candidate	Votes	%
Idaho Republican Party	Mark Harris (incumbent)	5,414	63.66%
Idaho Republican Party	Doug Toomer	3,090	36.34%
Total votes		8,504	100.00%

Idaho Legislative District 35 Senate General Election, 2022
Party	Candidate	Votes	%
Idaho Republican Party	Mark Harris (incumbent)	13,397	100.00%
Total votes		13,397	100.00%
Idaho Republican Party hold			

== See also ==
- 2022 United States elections
- 2022 United States Senate election in Idaho
- 2022 United States House of Representatives elections in Idaho
- 2022 Idaho elections
- 2022 Idaho gubernatorial election
- 2022 Idaho House of Representatives election
- Idaho Legislature
- List of Idaho state legislatures
