= 2024 Idaho Senate election =

2024 Idaho State Senate election
- November 5, 2024

All 35 seats in the Idaho Senate 18 seats needed for a majority

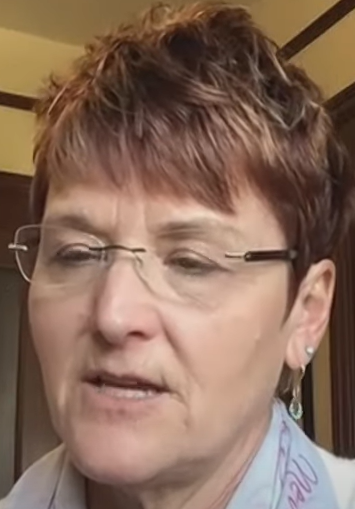
	Majority party	Minority party
Leader	Kelly Anthon	Melissa Wintrow
Party	Republican	Democratic
Leader's seat	27th	19th
Seats before	28	7
Seats after	29	6
Seat change	▲1	▼1
Popular vote	581,630	226,229
Percentage	70.10%	27.27%
Swing	▼6.80%	▲7.38%
- Results: Republican gain Republican hold Democratic hold
Majority Leader before election
Kelly Anthon
Republican
Elected Majority Leader
Lori Den Hartog
Republican

The 2024 Idaho Senate election was held on November 5, 2024, alongside the 2024 United States elections. For the first time in thirty years, the Idaho Democratic Party ran candidates in each legislative district on the ballot.

== Partisan Background ==
In the 2020 Presidential Election, Republican Donald Trump won the most votes in 31 of Idaho's legislative districts, and Democrat Joe Biden won the most votes in 4 districts. Going into the 2024 Idaho Senate election, there are 3 districts in which Trump won the most votes in 2020 that are currently represented by Democrats: District 15 in Suburban Ada County ( Trump + 5%); Blaine County-based District 26 ( Trump + 0.05%); and Pocatello-based District 29 ( Trump + 10%).

Biden 50–60% 60–70% / Trump 40–50% 50–60% 60–70% 70–80% 80–90%

== Incumbents defeated ==
=== In primary election ===
Five incumbent senators, all Republicans, were defeated in the May 21 primary election.

=== Republicans ===
1. District 1: Scott Herndon lost renomination to Jim Woodward.
2. District 8: Geoff Schroeder lost renomination to Christy Zito.
3. District 11: Chris Trakel lost renomination to Camille Blaylock.
4. District 20: Chuck Winder lost renomination to Josh Keyser.
5. District 25: Linda Wright Hartgen lost renomination to Josh Kohl.

=== In general election ===
1. District 15: Democratic incumbent Rick Just lost reelection to Republican Codi Galloway.

== Predictions ==
Source	Ranking	As of
Sabato's Crystal Ball	Safe R	October 23, 2024

== Results summary ==
Summary of the November 8, 2024 Idaho Senate election results
Party	Candidates	Votes		Seats				
Party	Candidates	No.	%	Before	Up	Won	After	+/–
Republican	33	581,630	70.10%	28	28	29	29	▲1
Democratic	27	226,229	27.27%	7	7	6	6	▼1
Independent	3 (incl. write-in)	9,760	1.18%	0	0	0	0	Steady
Libertarian	1	6,322	0.76%	0	0	0	0	Steady
Constitution	2	5,707	0.69%	0	0	0	0	Steady
Total		829,648	100.00%	35	35	35	35	Steady
Source: Idaho Elections Results

== Close races ==
District	Winner	Margin
District 15	Republican (flip)	3.6%
District 6	Republican	6.6%
District 26	Democratic	1.7%
District 16	Democratic	17.4%
District 17	Democratic	14.6%

== Summary of results by district ==
Italics denote an open seat held by the incumbent party; bold text denotes a gain for a party.

State Senate District	Incumbent	Party	Elected Senator	Outcome
1	Scott Herndon	Rep	Jim Woodward	Rep Hold
2	Phil Hart	Rep	Phil Hart	Rep Hold
3	Doug "Doug O" Okuniewicz	Rep	Doug "Doug O" Okuniewicz	Rep Hold
4	Ben Toews	Rep	Ben Toews	Rep Hold
5	Carl Bjerke	Rep	Carl Bjerke	Rep Hold
6	Dan Foreman	Rep	Dan Foreman	Rep Hold
7	Cindy Carlson	Rep	Cindy Carlson	Rep Hold
8	Geoff Schroeder	Rep	Christy Zito	Rep Hold
9	Brandon Shippy	Rep	Brandon Shippy	Rep Hold
10	Tammy Nichols	Rep	Tammy Nichols	Rep Hold
11	Chris Trakel	Rep	Camille Blaylock	Rep Hold
12	Ben Adams	Rep	Ben Adams	Rep Hold
13	Brian Lenney	Rep	Brian Lenney	Rep Hold
14	C. Scott Grow	Rep	C. Scott Grow	Rep Hold
15	Rick Just	Dem	**Codi Galloway**	**Rep Gain**
16	Ali Rabe	Dem	Ali Rabe	Dem Hold
17	Carrie Semmelroth	Dem	Carrie Semmelroth	Dem Hold
18	Janie Ward-Engelking	Dem	Janie Ward-Engelking	Dem Hold
19	Melissa Wintrow	Dem	Melissa Wintrow	Dem Hold
20	Chuck Winder	Rep	Josh Keyser	Rep Hold
21	Treg A. Bernt	Rep	Treg A. Bernt	Rep Hold
22	Lori Den Hartog	Rep	Lori Den Hartog	Rep Hold
23	Todd Lakey	Rep	Todd Lakey	Rep Hold
24	Glenneda Zuiderveld	Rep	Glenneda Zuiderveld	Rep Hold
25	Linda Wright Hartgen	Rep	Josh Kohl	Rep Hold
26	Ron Taylor	Dem	Ron Taylor	Dem Hold
27	Kelly Anthon	Rep	Kelly Anthon	Rep Hold
28	Jim Guthrie	Rep	Jim Guthrie	Rep Hold
29	James D. Ruchti	Dem	James D. Ruchti	Dem Hold
30	Julie VanOrden	Rep	Julie VanOrden	Rep Hold
31	Van T. Burtenshaw	Rep	Van T. Burtenshaw	Rep Hold
32	Kevin J. Cook	Rep	Kevin J. Cook	Rep Hold
33	Dave Lent	Rep	Dave Lent	Rep Hold
34	Doug Ricks	Rep	Doug Ricks	Rep Hold
35	Mark Harris	Rep	Mark Harris	Rep Hold

== Detailed results by Senate District ==
- Note: Official primary results can be obtained here

=== District 1 ===
Idaho's 1st legislative district Senate Primary Election, 2024
Party	Candidate	Votes	%
Republican	Jim Woodward	8,219	51.94
Republican	Scott Herndon (incumbent)	7,606	48.06
Total votes		15,825	100.0

Idaho's 1st legislative district Senate General Election, 2024
Party	Candidate	Votes	%
Republican	Jim Woodward	23,545	76.3%
Independent	Dan Rose	7,314	23.7%
Total votes		30,859	100%

=== District 2 ===
Idaho's 2nd legislative district Senate Primary Election, 2024
Party	Candidate	Votes	%
Republican	Phil Hart (incumbent)	7,503	100
Total votes		7,503	100.0

Idaho's 2nd legislative district Senate Democratic Primary Election, 2024
Party	Candidate	Votes	%
Democratic	Tom Hearn	891	100.0
Total votes		891	100.0

Idaho's 2nd legislative district Senate General Election, 2024
Party	Candidate	Votes	%
Republican	Phil Hart (incumbent)	23,221	80.3%
Democratic	Tom Hearn	5,680	19.7%
Total votes		28,901	100%

=== District 3 ===
Idaho's 3rd legislative district Senate Primary Election, 2024
Party	Candidate	Votes	%
Republican	Doug Okuniewicz (incumbent)	8,830	100
Total votes		8,830	100.0

Idaho's 3rd legislative district Senate Democratic Primary Election, 2024
Party	Candidate	Votes	%
Democratic	Brian Seguin	732	100.0
Total votes		732	100.0

Idaho's 3rd legislative district Senate General Election, 2024
Party	Candidate	Votes	%
Republican	Doug Okuniewicz (incumbent)	25,272	80.6%
Democratic	Brian Seguin	6,095	19.4%
Total votes		31,367	100%

=== District 4 ===
Idaho's 4th legislative district Senate Primary Election, 2024
Party	Candidate	Votes	%
Republican	Ben Toews (incumbent)	5,374	100
Total votes		5,374	100.0

Idaho's 4th legislative district Senate Democratic Primary Election, 2024
Party	Candidate	Votes	%
Democratic	Carissa Hober	1,037	100.0
Total votes		1,037	100.0

Idaho's 4th legislative district Senate General Election, 2024
Party	Candidate	Votes	%
Republican	Ben Toews (incumbent)	15,844	66.3%
Democratic	Carissa Hober	8,049	33.7%
Total votes		23,893	100%

=== District 5 ===
Idaho's 5th legislative district Senate Primary Election, 2024
Party	Candidate	Votes	%
Republican	Carl Bjerke (incumbent)	5,827	77.50
Republican	Cheri Zao	1,692	22.50
Total votes		7,519	100.0

Idaho's 5th legislative district Senate Democratic Primary Election, 2024
Party	Candidate	Votes	%
Democratic	Adam Chapman	581	100.0
Total votes		581	100.0

Idaho's 5th legislative district Senate General Election, 2024
Party	Candidate	Votes	%
Republican	Carl Bjerke (incumbent)	21,404	79.4%
Democratic	Adam Chapman	5,557	20.6%
Total votes		26,961	100%

=== District 6 ===
Idaho's 6th legislative district Senate Primary Election, 2024
Party	Candidate	Votes	%
Republican	Dan Foreman (incumbent)	3,396	53.24
Republican	Robert Blair	2,983	46.76
Total votes		6,379	100.0

Idaho's 6th legislative district Senate Democratic Primary Election, 2024
Party	Candidate	Votes	%
Democratic	Julia Parker	1,086	100.0
Total votes		1,086	100.0

Idaho's 6th legislative district Senate General Election, 2024
Party	Candidate	Votes	%
Republican	Dan Foreman (incumbent)	14,837	53.3%
Democratic	Julia Parker	12,986	46.7%
Total votes		27,823	100%

=== District 7 ===
Idaho's 7th legislative district Senate Primary Election, 2024
Party	Candidate	Votes	%
Republican	Cindy Carlson (incumbent)	6,444	100
Total votes		6,444	100.0

Idaho's 7th legislative district Senate Democratic Primary Election, 2024
Party	Candidate	Votes	%
Democratic	Bill Farmer	842	100.0
Total votes		842	100.0

Idaho's 7th legislative district Senate General Election, 2024
Party	Candidate	Votes	%
Republican	Cindy Carlson (incumbent)	19,918	75.3%
Democratic	Bill Farmer	6,522	24.7%
Total votes		26,440	100%

=== District 8 ===
Idaho's 8th legislative district Senate Primary Election, 2024
Party	Candidate	Votes	%
Republican	Christy Zito	4,862	56.35
Republican	Geoff Schroeder (incumbent)	3,766	43.65
Total votes		8,628	100.0

Idaho's 8th legislative district Senate Democratic Primary Election, 2024
Party	Candidate	Votes	%
Democratic	David Hoag	790	100.0
Total votes		790	100.0

Idaho's 8th legislative district Senate General Election, 2024
Party	Candidate	Votes	%
Republican	Christy Zito	17,750	72.1%
Democratic	David Hoag	6,859	27.9%
Total votes		24,609	100%

=== District 9 ===
Idaho's 9th legislative district Senate Primary Election, 2024
Party	Candidate	Votes	%
Republican	Brandon Shippy	4,404	51.70
Republican	Scott Syme	4,114	48.30
Total votes		8,518	100.0

Idaho's 9th legislative district Senate Democratic Primary Election, 2024
Party	Candidate	Votes	%
Democratic	Rachel Buck	412	100.0
Total votes		412	100.0

Idaho's 9th legislative district Senate General Election, 2024
Party	Candidate	Votes	%
Republican	Brandon Shippy (incumbent)	20,745	82.9%
Democratic	Rachel Buck	4,292	17.1%
Total votes		25,037	100%

=== District 10 ===
Idaho's 10th legislative district Senate Primary Election, 2024
Party	Candidate	Votes	%
Republican	Tammy Nichols (incumbent)	5,915	64.11
Republican	Lori Bishop	3,311	35.89
Total votes		9,226	100.0

Idaho's 10th legislative district Senate Democratic Primary Election, 2024
Party	Candidate	Votes	%
Democratic	Letishia Silva	666	100.0
Total votes		666	100.0

Idaho's 10th legislative district Senate General Election, 2024
Party	Candidate	Votes	%
Republican	Tammy Nichols (incumbent)	26,443	80.7%
Democratic	Letishia Silva	6,342	19.3%
Total votes		32,785	100%

=== District 11 ===
Idaho's 11th legislative district Senate Primary Election, 2024
Party	Candidate	Votes	%
Republican	Camille Blaylock	1,746	51.92
Republican	Chris Trakel (incumbent)	1,617	48.08
Total votes		3,363	100.0

Idaho's 11th legislative district Senate Democratic Primary Election, 2024
Party	Candidate	Votes	%
Democratic	Toni Fero	495	100.0
Total votes		495	100.0

IIdaho's 11th legislative district Senate General Election, 2024
Party	Candidate	Votes	%
Republican	Camille Blaylock	11,148	65.9%
Democratic	Toni Fero	5,762	34.1%
Total votes		16,910	100%

=== District 12 ===
Idaho's 12th legislative district Senate Primary Election, 2024
Party	Candidate	Votes	%
Republican	Ben Adams	2,580	57.58
Republican	Victor Rodriguez	1,901	42.42
Total votes		4,481	100.0

Idaho's 12th legislative district Senate General Election, 2024
Party	Candidate	Votes	%
Republican	Ben Adams	17,241	100%
Republican hold			

=== District 13 ===
Idaho's 13th legislative district Senate Primary Election, 2024
Party	Candidate	Votes	%
Republican	Brian Lenney (incumbent)	2,695	55.58
Republican	Jeff Agenbroad	2,154	44.42
Total votes		4,849	100.0

Idaho's 13th legislative district Senate Democratic Primary Election, 2024
Party	Candidate	Votes	%
Democratic	Sarah Butler	492	100.0
Total votes		492	100.0

Idaho's 13th legislative district Senate General Election, 2024
Party	Candidate	Votes	%
Republican	Brian Lenney (incumbent)	14,986	70%
Democratic	Sarah Butler	6,427	30%
Total votes		21,413	100%

=== District 14 ===
Idaho's 14th legislative district Senate Primary Election, 2024
Party	Candidate	Votes	%
Republican	C. Scott Grow (incumbent)	6,585	100
Total votes		6,585	100.0

Idaho's 14th legislative district Senate Constitution Primary Election, 2024
Party	Candidate	Votes	%
Constitution	Kirsten Faith Richardson	8	100.0
Total votes		8	100.0

Idaho's 14th legislative district Senate General Election, 2024
Party	Candidate	Votes	%
Republican	C. Scott Grow (incumbent)	26,212	84.9%
Constitution	Kirsten Faith Richardson	4,677	15.1%
Total votes		30,889	100%

=== District 15 ===
Idaho's 15th legislative district Senate Primary Election, 2024
Party	Candidate	Votes	%
Republican	Codi Galloway	3,286	100
Total votes		3,286	100.0

Idaho's 15th legislative district Senate Democratic Primary Election, 2024
Party	Candidate	Votes	%
Democratic	Rick Just (incumbent)	1,753	100.0
Total votes		1,753	100.0

Idaho's 15th legislative district Senate General Election, 2024
Party	Candidate	Votes	%
Republican	Codi Galloway	12,846	51.8%
Democratic	Rick Just (incumbent)	11,934	48.2%
Total votes		24,780	100%

=== District 16 ===
Idaho's 16th legislative district Senate Primary Election, 2024
Party	Candidate	Votes	%
Republican	LeeJoe Lay	2,145	100
Total votes		2,145	100.0

Idaho's 16th legislative district Senate Democratic Primary Election, 2024
Party	Candidate	Votes	%
Democratic	Alison Rabe (incumbent)	2,503	88.95
Democratic	Justin "Justice" Miston	311	11.05
Total votes		2,814	100.0

Idaho's 16th legislative district Senate General Election, 2024
Party	Candidate	Votes	%
Democratic	Alison Rabe (incumbent)	13,840	58.7%
Republican	Doug Rich	9,723	41.3%
Total votes		23,563	100%

=== District 17 ===
Idaho's 17th legislative district Senate Primary Election, 2024
Party	Candidate	Votes	%
Republican	Benjamin D. Chafetz	2,185	100
Total votes		2,185	100.0

Idaho's 17th legislative district Senate Democratic Primary Election, 2024
Party	Candidate	Votes	%
Democratic	Carrie Semmelroth (incumbent)	1,367	100
Total votes		1,367	100.0

Idaho's 17th legislative district Senate General Election, 2024
Party	Candidate	Votes	%
Democratic	Carrie Semmelroth (incumbent)	13,250	57.3%
Republican	Benjamin D. Chafetz	9,879	42.7%
Total votes		23,129	100%

=== District 18 ===
Idaho's 18th legislative district Senate Primary Election, 2024
Party	Candidate	Votes	%
Republican	Dan Bridges	2,245	100
Total votes		2,245	100.0

Idaho's 18th legislative district Senate Democratic Primary Election, 2024
Party	Candidate	Votes	%
Democratic	Janie Ward-Engelking (incumbent)	1,560	100
Total votes		1,560	100.0

Idaho's 18th legislative district Senate General Election, 2024
Party	Candidate	Votes	%
Democratic	Janie Ward-Engelking (incumbent)	15,226	62.6%
Republican	Dan Bridges	9,080	37.4%
Total votes		24,306	100%

=== District 19 ===
Idaho's 19th legislative district Senate Democratic Primary Election, 2024
Party	Candidate	Votes	%
Democratic	Melissa Wintrow (incumbent)	2,293	100
Total votes		2,293	100.0

Idaho's 19th legislative district Senate General Election, 2024
Party	Candidate	Votes	%
Democratic	Melissa Wintrow (incumbent)	23,153	100%
Democratic hold			

=== District 20 ===
Idaho's 20th legislative district Senate Primary Election, 2024
Party	Candidate	Votes	%
Republican	Josh Keyser	3,207	52.29
Republican	Chuck Winder (incumbent)	2,926	47.71
Total votes		6,133	100.0

Idaho's 20th legislative district Senate Democratic Primary Election, 2024
Party	Candidate	Votes	%
Democratic	Andy Arriaga	955	100.0
Total votes		955	100.0

Idaho's 20th legislative district Senate General Election, 2024
Party	Candidate	Votes	%
Republican	Josh Keyser	18,971	69.6%
Democratic	Andy Arriaga	8,281	30.4%
Total votes		27,252	100%

=== District 21 ===
Idaho's 21st legislative district Senate Primary Election, 2024
Party	Candidate	Votes	%
Republican	Treg Bernt (incumbent)	3,235	59.31
Republican	Brenda Bourn	2,219	40.69
Total votes		5,454	100.0

Idaho's 21st legislative district Senate Libertarian Primary Election, 2024
Party	Candidate	Votes	%
Libertarian Party of Idaho	Mike Long	26	100.0
Total votes		26	100.0

Idaho's 21st legislative district Senate General Election, 2024
Party	Candidate	Votes	%
Republican	Treg Bernt (incumbent)	18,233	74.3%
Libertarian Party of Idaho	Mike Long	6,322	25.7%
Total votes		24,555	100%

=== District 22 ===
Idaho's 22nd legislative district Senate Primary Election, 2024
Party	Candidate	Votes	%
Republican	Lori Den Hartog (incumbent)	4,078	100
Total votes		4,078	100.0

Idaho's 22nd legislative district Senate Democratic Primary Election, 2024
Party	Candidate	Votes	%
Democratic	Dawn Pierce	1,085	100
Total votes		1,085	100.0

Idaho's 22nd legislative district Senate General Election, 2024
Party	Candidate	Votes	%
Republican	Lori Den Hartog (incumbent)	19,635	66.6%
Democratic	Dawn Pierce	9,827	33.4%
Total votes		29,462	100%

=== District 23 ===
Idaho's 23rd legislative district Senate Primary Election, 2024
Party	Candidate	Votes	%
Republican	Todd Lakey (incumbent)	5,608	100
Total votes		5,608	100.0

Idaho's 23rd legislative district Senate Democratic Primary Election, 2024
Party	Candidate	Votes	%
Democratic	Paul Morgan	469	100
Total votes		469	100.0

Idaho's 23rd legislative district Senate Constitution Primary Election, 2024
Party	Candidate	Votes	%
Constitution	Paul Smith	21	100
Total votes		21	100.0

Idaho's 23rd legislative district Senate General Election, 2024
Party	Candidate	Votes	%
Republican	Todd Lakey (incumbent)	19,455	77.8%
Democratic	Paul Morgan	4,519	18.1%
Constitution	Paul Smith	1,030	4.1%
Total votes		25,004	100%

=== District 24 ===
Idaho's 24th legislative district Senate Primary Election, 2024
Party	Candidate	Votes	%
Republican	Glenneda Zuiderveld (incumbent)	4,923	54.59
Republican	Alex Caval	4,095	45.41
Total votes		9,018	100.0

Idaho's 24th legislative district Senate Democratic Primary Election, 2024
Party	Candidate	Votes	%
Democratic	Edward Easterling	318	100.0
Total votes		318	100.0

Idaho's 24th legislative district Senate General Election, 2024
Party	Candidate	Votes	%
Republican	Glenneda Zuiderveld (incumbent)	17,834	78.8%
Democratic	Edward Easterling	4,795	21.2%
Total votes		22,629	100%

=== District 25 ===
Idaho's 25th legislative district Senate Primary Election, 2024
Party	Candidate	Votes	%
Republican	Josh Kohl	3,008	63.07
Republican	Linda Wright Hartgen (incumbent)	1,761	36.93
Total votes		4,769	100.0

Idaho's 25th legislative district Senate Democratic Primary Election, 2024
Party	Candidate	Votes	%
Democratic	W. Lane Startin	380	100.0
Total votes		380	100.0

Idaho's 25th legislative district Senate General Election, 2024
Party	Candidate	Votes	%
Republican	Josh Kohl	13,887	100%
Democratic	W. Lane Startin		
Total votes			

=== District 26 ===
Idaho's 26th legislative district Senate Primary Election, 2024
Party	Candidate	Votes	%
Republican	Laurie Lickley	3,253	100
Total votes		3,253	100.0

Idaho's 26th legislative district Senate Democratic Primary Election, 2024
Party	Candidate	Votes	%
Democratic	Ron Taylor (incumbent)	3,153	100
Total votes		3,153	100.0

Idaho's 26th legislative district Senate General Election, 2024
Party	Candidate	Votes	%
Republican	Laurie Lickley	9,952	43.9%
Democratic	Ron Taylor (incumbent)	10,319	45.6%
Independent	Kala Tate	2,380	10.5%
Total votes		22,651	100%

=== District 27 ===
Idaho's 27th legislative district Senate Primary Election, 2024
Party	Candidate	Votes	%
Republican	Kelly Anthon (incumbent)	5,910	100
Total votes		5,910	100.0

Idaho's 27th legislative district Senate Democratic Primary Election, 2024
Party	Candidate	Votes	%
Democratic	Damian Rogriguez	209	100
Total votes		209	100.0

Idaho's 27th legislative district Senate General Election, 2024
Party	Candidate	Votes	%
Republican	Kelly Anthon (incumbent)	17,628	100%
Democratic	Damian Rodriguez		
Total votes			

=== District 28 ===
Idaho's 28th legislative district Senate Primary Election, 2024
Party	Candidate	Votes	%
Republican	Jim Guthrie (incumbent)	6,118	100
Total votes		6,118	100.0

Idaho's 28th legislative district Senate Democratic Primary Election, 2024
Party	Candidate	Votes	%
Democratic	Russell "Russ" Matter	552	100
Total votes		552	100.0

Idaho's 28th legislative district Senate General Election, 2024
Party	Candidate	Votes	%
Republican	Jim Guthrie (incumbent)	19,027	78.7%
Democratic	Russell "Russ" Matter	5,139	21.3%
Total votes		24,166	100%

=== District 29 ===
Idaho's 29th legislative district Senate Democratic Primary Election, 2024
Party	Candidate	Votes	%
Democratic	James Ruchti (incumbent)	1,155	100
Total votes		1,155	100.0

Idaho's 29th legislative district Senate General Election, 2024
Party	Candidate	Votes	%
Democratic	James Ruchti (incumbent)	16,155	100%
Democratic hold			

=== District 30 ===
Idaho's 30th legislative district Senate Primary Election, 2024
Party	Candidate	Votes	%
Republican	Julie VanOrden (incumbent)	4,765	63.14
Republican	Jerry Truth Bingham	2,782	36.86
Total votes		7.547	100.0

Idaho's 30th legislative district Senate Democratic Primary Election, 2024
Party	Candidate	Votes	%
Democratic	Karen Keith	286	100.0
Total votes		286	100.0

Idaho's 30th legislative district Senate General Election, 2024
Party	Candidate	Votes	%
Republican	Julie VanOrden (incumbent)	17,996	84%
Democratic	Karen Keith	3,432	16%
Total votes		21,428	100%

=== District 31 ===
Idaho's 31st legislative district Senate Primary Election, 2024
Party	Candidate	Votes	%
Republican	Van Burtenshaw (incumbent)	8,788	100
Total votes		8,788	100.0

Idaho's 31st legislative district Senate Democratic Primary Election, 2024
Party	Candidate	Votes	%
Democratic	Dean Martonen	395	100
Total votes		395	100.0

Idaho's 31st legislative district Senate General Election, 2024
Party	Candidate	Votes	%
Republican	Van Burtenshaw (incumbent)	23,525	87.5%
Democratic	Dean Martonen	3,351	12.5%
Total votes		26,876	100%

=== District 32 ===
Idaho's 32nd legislative district Senate Primary Election, 2024
Party	Candidate	Votes	%
Republican	Kevin Cook (incumbent)	4,707	69.11
Republican	Keith Newberry	2,104	30.89
Total votes		6,811	100.0

Idaho's 32nd legislative district Senate General Election, 2024
Party	Candidate	Votes	%
Republican	Kevin Cook (incumbent)	16,750	100%
Republican hold			

=== District 33 ===
Idaho's 33rd legislative district Senate Primary Election, 2024
Party	Candidate	Votes	%
Republican	Dave Lent (incumbent)	2,580	60.08
Republican	Bryan Scholz	1,714	39.92
Total votes		4,294	100.0

Idaho's 33rd legislative district Senate General Election, 2024
Party	Candidate	Votes	%
Republican	Dave Lent (incumbent)	13,118	100%
Total votes		13,118	100%
Republican hold			

=== District 34 ===
Idaho's 34th legislative district Senate Primary Election, 2024
Party	Candidate	Votes	%
Republican	Doug Ricks (incumbent)	3,587	100
Total votes		3,587	100.0

Idaho's 34th legislative district Senate Democratic Primary Election, 2024
Party	Candidate	Votes	%
Democratic	Marsha Craner	129	100.0
Total votes		129	100.0

Idaho's 34th legislative district Senate General Election, 2024
Party	Candidate	Votes	%
Republican	Doug Ricks (incumbent)	14,618	86%
Democratic	Marsha Craner	2,375	14%
Total votes		16,993	100%

=== District 35 ===
Idaho's 35th legislative district Senate Primary Election, 2024
Party	Candidate	Votes	%
Republican	Mark Harris	5,033	62.25
Republican	Doug Toomer	3,052	37.75
Total votes		8.085	100.0

Idaho's 35th legislative district Senate Democratic Primary Election, 2024
Party	Candidate	Votes	%
Democratic	Chris Riley	489	100.0
Total votes		489	100.0

Idaho's 35th legislative district Senate General Election, 2024
Party	Candidate	Votes	%
Republican	Mark Harris	20,907	77.5%
Democratic	Chris Riley	6,062	22.5%
Total votes		26,969	100%

== See also ==
- List of Idaho state legislatures
