= 2020 Idaho Senate election =

- November 3, 2020

All 35 seats in the Idaho Senate 18 seats needed for a majority
	Majority party	Minority party
Leader	Chuck Winder	Michelle Stennett
Party	Republican	Democratic
Leader's seat	20th District	26th district
Seats before	28	7
Seats after	28	7
Seat change	Steady	Steady
Popular vote	284,487	159,391
Percentage	60.22%	33.74%
- Results: Republican hold Democratic hold
Majority Leader before election
Chuck Winder
Republican
Elected Majority Leader
Kelly Anthon
Republican

The 2020 Idaho Senate election took place as part of the biennial 2020 United States elections. Idaho voters elected state senators in all of the state's 35 senate districts. State senators serve two-year terms in the Idaho Senate.

No seats changed hands in the election, with the closest, the Moscow-based District 5, being within one percentage point of flipping.

== Retirements ==
Six incumbents did not run for re-election in 2020. Those incumbents are:

=== Republicans ===
1. District 3: Don Cheatham: Retiring
2. District 23: Bert Brackett: Retiring
3. District 30: Dean Mortimer: Retiring
4. District 34: Brent Hill: Retiring

=== Democrats ===
1. District 17: Maryanne Jordan: Retiring
2. District 19: Cherie Buckner-Webb: Retiring

== Predictions ==
Source	Ranking	As of
The Cook Political Report	Safe R	October 21, 2020

== Results summary ==
Summary of the November 3, 2020 Idaho Senate election results
Party	Candidates	Votes		Seats				
Party	Candidates	No.	%	Before	Up	Won	After	+/–
Republican	34	284,487	60.22%	28	28	28	28	Steady
Democratic	16	159,391	33.74%	7	7	7	7	Steady
Independent	3	22,101	4.68%	0	0	0	0	Steady
Libertarian	1	4,916	1.04%	0	0	0	0	Steady
Constitution	1	1,528	0.32%	0	0	0	0	Steady
Total		472,423	100.0%	35	35	35	35	Steady
Source: Idaho Elections Results

Popular vote
Republican	60.22%
Democratic	33.74%
Independent	4.68%
Libertarian	1.04%
Constitution	0.32%

Senate seats
Republican	80%
Democratic	20%

== Close races ==
District	Winner	Margin
District 5	Democratic	0.88%
District 15	Republican	5.98%
District 26	Democratic	12.7%

== Summary of results by State Senate district ==
State Senate district	Incumbent	Party	Elected Senator	Party
Idaho 1	Jim Woodward	Rep	Jim Woodward	Rep
Idaho 2	Steve Vick	Rep	Steve Vick	Rep
Idaho 3	Don Cheatham	Rep	Peter Riggs	Rep
Idaho 4	Mary Souza	Rep	Mary Souza	Rep
Idaho 5	David Nelson	Dem	David Nelson	Dem
Idaho 6	Dan G. Johnson	Rep	Dan G. Johnson	Rep
Idaho 7	Carl Crabtree	Rep	Carl Crabtree	Rep
Idaho 8	Steven Thayn	Rep	Steven Thayn	Rep
Idaho 9	Abby Lee	Rep	Abby Lee	Rep
Idaho 10	Jim Rice	Rep	Jim Rice	Rep
Idaho 11	Patti Anne Lodge	Rep	Patti Anne Lodge	Rep
Idaho 12	Todd Lakey	Rep	Todd Lakey	Rep
Idaho 13	Jeff Agenbroad	Rep	Jeff Agenbroad	Rep
Idaho 14	C. Scott Grow	Rep	C. Scott Grow	Rep
Idaho 15	Fred Martin	Rep	Fred Martin	Rep
Idaho 16	Grant Burgoyne	Dem	Grant Burgoyne	Dem
Idaho 17	Maryanne Jordan	Dem	Alison Rabe	Dem
Idaho 18	Janie Ward-Engelking	Dem	Janie Ward-Engelking	Dem
Idaho 19	Cherie Buckner-Webb	Dem	Melissa Wintrow	Dem
Idaho 20	Chuck Winder	Rep	Chuck Winder	Rep
Idaho 21	Regina Bayer	Rep	Regina Bayer	Rep
Idaho 22	Lori Den Hartog	Rep	Lori Den Hartog	Rep
Idaho 23	Bert Brackett	Rep	Christy Zito	Rep
Idaho 24	Lee Heider	Rep	Lee Heider	Rep
Idaho 25	Jim Patrick	Rep	Jim Patrick	Rep
Idaho 26	Michelle Stennett	Dem	Michelle Stennett	Dem
Idaho 27	Kelly Anthon	Rep	Kelly Anthon	Rep
Idaho 28	Jim Guthrie	Rep	Jim Guthrie	Rep
Idaho 29	Mark Nye	Dem	Mark Nye	Dem
Idaho 30	Dean Mortimer	Rep	Kevin Cook	Rep
Idaho 31	Steve Bair	Rep	Steve Bair	Rep
Idaho 32	Mark Harris	Rep	Mark Harris	Rep
Idaho 33	Dave Lent	Rep	Dave Lent	Rep
Idaho 34	Brent Hill	Rep	Doug Ricks	Rep
Idaho 35	Van Burtenshaw	Rep	Van Burtenshaw	Rep

== Detailed results ==
District	Party	Incumbent	Status	Party	Candidate	Votes	%
1	Idaho Republican Party	Jim Woodward	Re-elected	Idaho Republican Party	Jim Woodward	22,433	77.40%
1	Idaho Republican Party	Jim Woodward	Re-elected	Democratic	Vera Gadman	6,549	22.60%
2	Idaho Republican Party	Steve Vick	Re-elected	Idaho Republican Party	Steve Vick	26,240	100.00%
3	Idaho Republican Party	Don Cheatham	Retired	Idaho Republican Party	Peter Riggs	24,141	100.00%
4	Idaho Republican Party	Mary Souza	Re-elected	Idaho Republican Party	Mary Souza	17,462	64.51%
4	Idaho Republican Party	Mary Souza	Re-elected	Democratic	Sharon "Shari" L. Williams	9,608	35.49%
5	Democratic	David Nelson	Re-elected	Democratic	David Nelson	12,691	50.44%
5	Democratic	David Nelson	Re-elected	Idaho Republican Party	Dan Foreman	12,471	49.56%
6	Idaho Republican Party	Dan G. Johnson	Re-elected	Idaho Republican Party	Dan G. Johnson	19,722	100.00%
7	Idaho Republican Party	Carl Crabtree	Re-elected	Idaho Republican Party	Carl Crabtree	19,896	100.00%
8	Idaho Republican Party	Steven Thayn	Re-elected	Idaho Republican Party	Steven Thayn	20,173	73.93%
8	Idaho Republican Party	Steven Thayn	Re-elected	Independent	Bill Sifford	5,589	20.48%
8	Idaho Republican Party	Steven Thayn	Re-elected	Constitution	Kirsten Faith Richardson	1,526	5.59%
9	Idaho Republican Party	Abby Lee	Re-elected	Idaho Republican Party	Abby Lee	20,157	100.00%
10	Idaho Republican Party	Jim Rice	Re-elected	Idaho Republican Party	Jim Rice	11,446	64.84%
10	Idaho Republican Party	Jim Rice	Re-elected	Democratic	Toni Ferro	6,207	35.16%
11	Idaho Republican Party	Patti Anne Lodge	Re-elected	Idaho Republican Party	Patti Anne Lodge	20,631	100.00%
12	Idaho Republican Party	Todd Lakey	Re-elected	Idaho Republican Party	Todd Lakey	14,509	69.91%
12	Idaho Republican Party	Todd Lakey	Re-elected	Democratic	Chelle Gluch	6,245	30.09%
13	Idaho Republican Party	Jeff Agenbroad	Re-elected	Idaho Republican Party	Jeff Agenbroad	15,222	70.74%
13	Idaho Republican Party	Jeff Agenbroad	Re-elected	Democratic	Melissa Sue Robinson	6,290	29.23%
13	Idaho Republican Party	Jeff Agenbroad	Re-elected	Independent	Michaella J. Franklin	7	0.03%
14	Idaho Republican Party	C. Scott Grow	Re-elected	Idaho Republican Party	C. Scott Grow	29,523	72.96%
14	Idaho Republican Party	C. Scott Grow	Re-elected	Independent	Ellen B. Spencer	10,942	27.04%
15	Idaho Republican Party	Fred S. Martin	Re-elected	Idaho Republican Party	Fred S. Martin	12,009	52.99%
15	Idaho Republican Party	Fred S. Martin	Re-elected	Democratic	Rick Just	10,654	47.01%
16	Democratic	Grant Burgoyne	Re-elected	Democratic	Grant Burgoyne	15,128	62.30%
16	Democratic	Grant Burgoyne	Re-elected	Idaho Republican Party	LeeJoe Lay	9,154	37.70%
17	Democratic	Maryanne Jordan	Retired	Democratic	Ali Rabe	12,891	61.79%
17	Democratic	Maryanne Jordan	Retired	Idaho Republican Party	Gary L. Smith	7,972	38.21%
18	Democratic	Janie Ward-Engelking	Re-elected	Democratic	Janie Ward-Engelking	17,928	61.92%
18	Democratic	Janie Ward-Engelking	Re-elected	Idaho Republican Party	Mark A. Bost	11,022	38.07%
18	Democratic	Janie Ward-Engelking	Re-elected	Independent	Hilary A. Lee	5	0.02%
19	Democratic	Cherie Buckner-Webb	Retired	Democratic	Melissa Wintrow	21,344	68.60%
19	Democratic	Cherie Buckner-Webb	Retired	Idaho Republican Party	Aaron J. Tribble	9,768	31.40%
20	Idaho Republican Party	Chuck Winder	Re-elected	Idaho Republican Party	Chuck Winder	21,042	100.00%
21	Idaho Republican Party	Regina Bayer	Re-elected	Idaho Republican Party	Regina Bayer	19,869	63.88%
21	Idaho Republican Party	Regina Bayer	Re-elected	Democratic	Dawn Pierce	11,235	36.12%
22	Idaho Republican Party	Lori Den Hartog	Re-elected	Idaho Republican Party	Lori Den Hartog	17,997	74.25%
22	Idaho Republican Party	Lori Den Hartog	Re-elected	Democratic	Mik Lose	6,242	25.75%
23	Idaho Republican Party	Bert Brackett	Retired	Idaho Republican Party	Christy Zito	13,282	76.28%
23	Idaho Republican Party	Bert Brackett	Retired	Democratic	Laura Bellegante	4,130	23.72%
24	Idaho Republican Party	Lee Heider	Re-elected	Idaho Republican Party	Lee Heider	13,587	70.96%
24	Idaho Republican Party	Lee Heider	Re-elected	Independent	Rocky Ferrenburg	5,560	29.04%
25	Idaho Republican Party	Jim Patrick	Re-elected	Idaho Republican Party	Jim Patrick	17,211	100.00%
26	Democratic	Michelle Stennett	Re-elected	Democratic	Michelle Stennett	12,291	56.35%
26	Democratic	Michelle Stennett	Re-elected	Idaho Republican Party	Eric Parker	9,519	43.65%
27	Idaho Republican Party	Kelly Anthon	Re-elected	Idaho Republican Party	Kelly Arthur Anthon	15,832	100.00%
28	Idaho Republican Party	Jim Guthrie	Re-elected	Idaho Republican Party	Jim Guthrie	17,067	77.64%
28	Idaho Republican Party	Jim Guthrie	Re-elected	Libertarian	Dan Karlan	4,916	22.36%
29	Democratic	Mark Nye	Re-elected	Democratic	Mark Nye	14,821	100.00%
30	Idaho Republican Party	Dean Mortimer	Retired	Idaho Republican Party	Kevin Cook	19,188	100.00%
31	Idaho Republican Party	Steve Bair	Re-elected	Idaho Republican Party	Steve Bair	16,955	100.00%
32	Idaho Republican Party	Mark Harris	Re-elected	Idaho Republican Party	Mark Harris	20,462	100.00%
33	Idaho Republican Party	Dave Lent	Re-elected	Idaho Republican Party	Dave Lent	13,201	100.00%
34	Idaho Republican Party	Brent Hill	Retired	Idaho Republican Party	Doug Ricks	18,547	100.00%
35	Idaho Republican Party	Van Burtenshaw	Re-elected	Idaho Republican Party	Van Burtenshaw	20,334	100.00%

== See also ==
- 2020 Idaho elections
