= Elliot Werk =

Canadian-born American politician from Idaho

Member of the Idaho Senate from District 17
- In office December 1, 2002 – February 17, 2015
- Preceded by: Grant Ipsen
- Succeeded by: Maryanne Jordan

Personal details
- Born: April 16, 1957 (age 69) Montreal, Quebec, Canada
- Party: Democratic
- Spouse: Nancy Greenwald
- Education: Sonoma State University, University of Arizona
- Occupation: Business owner, geologist

Elliot Werk (born April 16, 1957) is a Democratic politician from Boise, Idaho in the United States. From 2002 until 2015 he served as the Idaho State Senator from District 17, which is based in the Boise Bench neighborhood.

Werk was born in Montreal, Quebec, Canada, and emigrated to the United States when he was seven years old. He became a naturalized United States citizen while in college. After living in various locations throughout the United States, Werk moved to Idaho in the late 1990s with his family.

Werk was elected to the Idaho Senate in 2002, defeating Republican incumbent Grant R. Ipsen and Libertarian candidate David H. Slack. He was reelected to a sixth term in 2012 by a nearly 2-1 margin.

In January 2009 Werk succeeded Kate Kelly as assistant minority leader in the Idaho Senate. Kelly in turn became minority leader succeeding Clint Stennett, who battled brain cancer during the 2009 and 2010 sessions and died in October 2010.

In February 2015 Werk resigned from the Idaho Senate to take a position on the Idaho State Tax Commission. He was succeeded by Boise City Council president Maryanne Jordan.

Werk retired from the Tax Commission on September 3, 2021.
