= Senator Stennett =

Senator Stennett may refer to:

- Clint Stennett (1956–2010), Idaho State Senate
- Michelle Stennett (born 1960), Idaho State Senate
