= Malepeai =

Malepeai is a surname. Notable people with the surname include:

- Edgar Malepeai (born 1950), American politician from Idaho
- Vavae Malepeai (born 1998), American football player
