= Treg (name) =

Treg is a name. Notable people with the name include:

- Treg Bernt (born 1976), American politician
- Treg Brown (1899–1984), American motion picture sound editor
- Treg Songy (1962–2002), American football player
- Treg Taylor (born 1976), American lawyer
