= George Floyd protests in Idaho =

2020 civil unrest after the murder of George Floyd

- Part of George Floyd protests
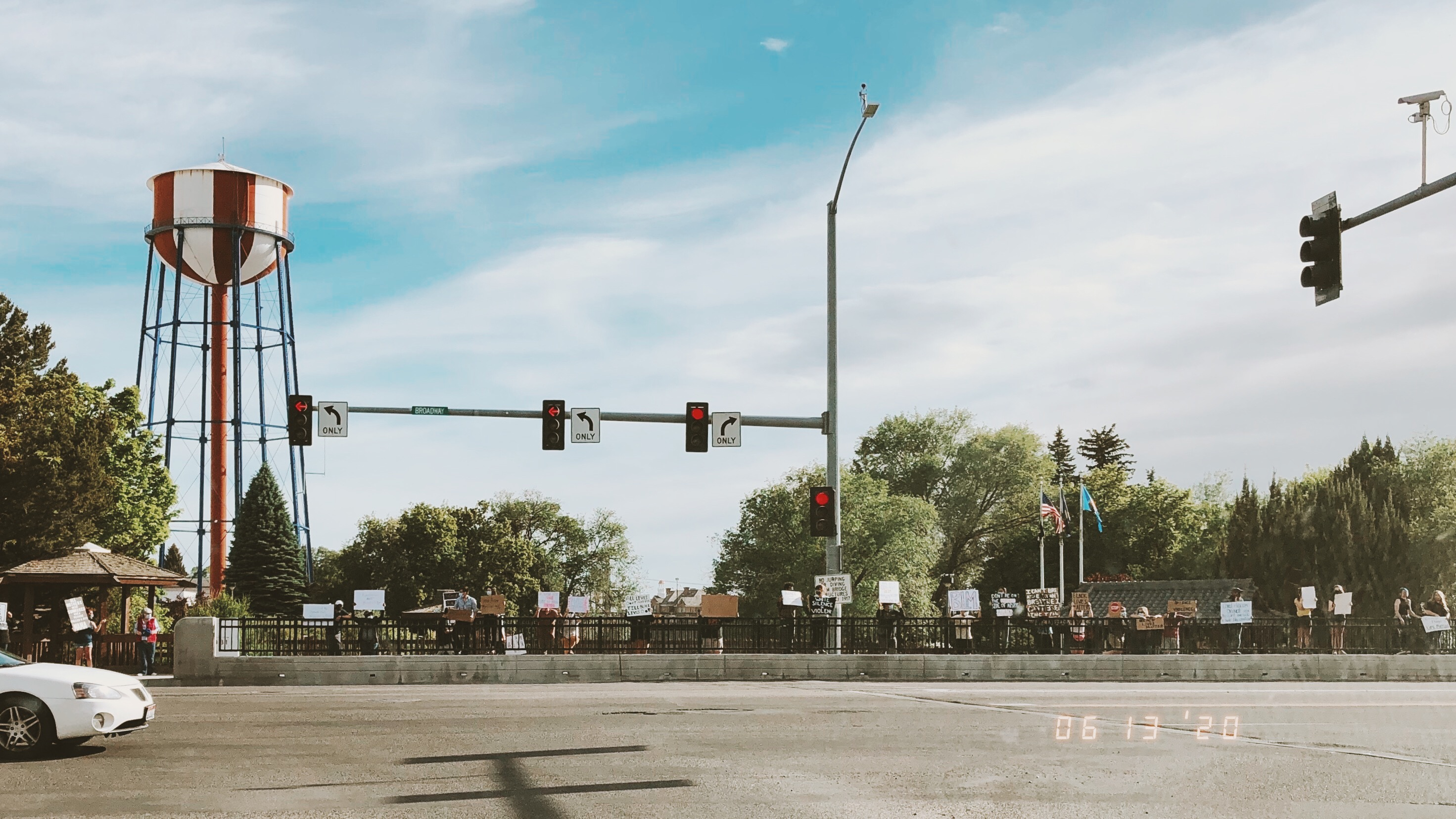
- Protest in Idaho Falls on June 13
- Date: May 28 – June 13, 2020 (2 weeks and 2 days)
- Location: Idaho, United States
- Caused by: Police brutality; Institutional racism against African Americans; Reaction to the murder of George Floyd; Economic, racial and social inequality

This is a list of George Floyd protests in Idaho, United States.

== Locations ==
=== Boise ===
A handful of people protested in front of the Idaho State Capitol on May 30. Hundreds more gathered on the same steps on May 31. On Monday night, June 1, 100 to 150 protesters gathered at the Capitol again; two opposing groups were present, according to one report. A single gunshot was fired during the protest; Boise Police subsequently arrested an 18-year-old man and said the incident was being investigated as accidental or unintentional.

=== Coeur d’Alene ===
On June 2, a group of around 25 protesters, mostly young people in their teens and 20s, gathered in the city's downtown. Over 1,000 armed spectators looked on and the event remained peaceful. On June 4, a group of 150 walked downtown followed by another group of "peacekeepers."

=== Hailey ===
On June 2, over 800 people marched down Main Street to protest the murder of George Floyd. Police officers joined the demonstrators as they took a knee and held an eight-minute, forty-six-second moment of silence to honor Floyd.

=== Idaho Falls ===
On May 30, about 70 people protested on the Broadway Bridge. The event was run by the Bonneville County Democratic Party.

=== Ketchum ===
On June 2, hundreds of protesters marched down Main Street to protest police brutality and held a moment of silence for eight minutes and forty-six seconds in honor of George Floyd. Despite blocking traffic, the protest remained peaceful and no road rage incidents were reported.

=== Lewiston ===
On June 6, approximately 1,000 people gathered in Kiwanis Park to support Black Lives Matter and George Floyd. A 10-minute moment of silence was held before the protesters began marching through the streets. Armed members of the counter-protest group Protect LC Valley marched through downtown Lewiston, a mile away from the Black Lives Matter protest, to prevent riots and lootings. Both protests were peaceful.

=== Moscow ===
More than 100 people protested in Friendship Square on June 3. Idaho State Senator David Nelson attended the event and condemned police brutality and the murder of George Floyd.

=== Pocatello ===
On June 3, 2020, hundreds gathered in the Portneuf Wellness Complex in Pocatello for the "Kneel For Nine Unity March." The event was a tribute to George Floyd. Idaho State's student athletes also lead protests of their own, several hundred people marched in support.

=== Rexburg ===
On May 31, 2020, over 200 people held a vigil for George Floyd at the Beehive Pavilion in Porter Park. From June 2 to 5 and June 8 to 12 there were protests held at the corner of Porter Park containing 30 to 170 people depending on the day. Protesters held signs for passing cars and pedestrians, chanted, marched around the park while chanting, and on the 2nd and 3rd marched to the intersection of W 2nd S and S 1st W to write Black Lives Matter slogans, names of black lives lost to police brutality, and passages from the LDS scriptural canon in chalk on the sidewalks.

=== Sandpoint ===
For at least three days beginning on June 2, demonstrators gathered at the Long Bridge to protest the murder of George Floyd. The third protest on June 4 featured at least 100 protesters.

=== Twin Falls ===
On June 2, almost 300 people attended a peaceful vigil at Twin Falls City Park, where a moment of silence was held for eight minutes and forty-six seconds. Among those who gave speeches was Armenian refugee and author Liyah Babayan, who compared the killings of black Americans by police officers to the Armenian genocide.

=== Victor ===
On June 6, over 200 people marched in protest of the murder of George Floyd. At the intersection of Main and Enter Streets, the protesters kneeled for eight minutes and forty-six seconds to honor Floyd.
