= Camille Blaylock =

American politician

Member of the Idaho Senate from the 11th district
- Incumbent
- Assumed office December 1, 2024
- Preceded by: Chris Trakel

Personal details
- Born: Canyon County, Idaho, U.S.
- Party: Republican
- Children: 2
- Parent: Tom Luna (father)
- Education: Idaho State University (BA)

Camille Blaylock is an American politician serving as a Republican member of the Idaho Senate for the 11th district. She was first elected in 2024 after defeating incumbent Chris Trakel in the Republican primary, and assumed office on December 1, 2024.

== Early life and education ==
Blaylock was born and raised in Canyon County, Idaho. She is Hispanic. Her father, Tom Luna, is a former Idaho Superintendent of Public Instruction and former chair of the Idaho Republican Party. She earned a Bachelor of Arts in communications from Idaho State University.

== Career ==
Outside of politics, Blaylock has worked in healthcare technology and corporate event management. She was elected to the Idaho Senate in the 2024 election, defeating incumbent Chris Trakel in the Republican primary.

Blaylock opposed a part of a 2025 deregulation bill that would allow child care centers to choose their own staff-to-child ratios, saying that the state-set ratios create minimum safety standards for private businesses. The version of the bill ultimately signed into law by Governor Brad Little was amended to loosen minimum child-to-staff ratios instead of fully repealing the minimums.

In 2026, she sponsored a bill that was passed by the Legislature to create a $5 million fund for high-needs students in special education, having previously tried and failed to pass a similar bill in the year before. She also repealed the Empowering Parents grant program, which made available $30 million per year to assist parents with buying laptops and other items needed for home learning, with Blaylock saying that she believed the grant was no longer needed.
