= Rick Just =

American politician and author

Member of the Idaho Senate
- In office December 1, 2022 – November 30, 2024
- Preceded by: Fred Martin
- Succeeded by: Codi Galloway
- Constituency: 15th district

Personal details
- Born: James Just Blackfoot, Idaho, U.S.
- Party: Democratic
- Children: 1
- Education: Boise State University (BA, MPA)

Military service
- Branch/service: United States Marine Corps
- Years of service: 1969–1971

James R. "Rick" Just is an American politician and author who previously served as a member of the Idaho Senate for the 15th district. Elected in November 2022, he assumed office on December 1, 2022.

== Early life and education ==
Just was born in Blackfoot, Idaho, and graduated from Firth High School. He earned a Bachelor of Arts degree in English and a Master of Public Administration from Boise State University.

== Career ==
Just served in the United States Marine Corps from 1969 to 1971. For 30 years, he worked for the Idaho Department of Parks and Recreation, retiring as chief planner. Just is also the author of two adult novels, four YA novels, and several books on Idaho history. He was elected to the Idaho Senate in November 2022. He lost re-election in 2024 to Republican Codi Galloway.
