= Maxine Bell =

American farmer, librarian, and politician from Idaho

Member of the Idaho House of Representatives
- In office December 1, 1988 – November 30, 2018
- Preceded by: Waldo Martens
- Succeeded by: Laurie Lickley
- Constituency: 24th district Seat D (1988–1992); 24th district Seat B (1992-2002); 26th district Seat B (2002–2012); 25th district Seat B (2012–2018)

Personal details
- Born: August 6, 1931 (age 95) Logan, Utah, United States
- Party: Republican
- Spouse: Jack Bell (m. 1949; died 2021)
- Education: College of Southern Idaho, Idaho State University
- Occupation: Farmer, librarian

Maxine Bell (née Toolson) (born August 6, 1931) is an American politician and a former librarian. Bell was a Republican member of the Idaho House of Representatives.

== Early life ==
On August 6, 1931, Bell was born in Logan, Utah.

== Education ==
Bell earned an Associate of Arts in library science from College of Southern Idaho. Bell also attended Idaho State University.

== Career ==
Bell is a farmer and a retired school librarian in Idaho.

Bell was first elected to the Idaho House of Representatives in 1988.

In November 1992, Bell was reelected to the Idaho House of Representatives for District 24 seat B. On November 8, 1994, as an incumbent, Bell won the election and continued serving District 24 seat B. On November 5, 1996, as an incumbent, Bell won the election and continued serving District 24 seat B. On November 3, 1998, as an incumbent, Bell won the election and continued serving District 24 seat B. On November 7, 2000, as an incumbent, Bell won the election and continued serving District 24 seat B. Bell defeated Monies L. Smith.

On November 5, 2002, Bell was reelected to the Idaho House of Representatives for District 26 seat B. On November 2, 2004, as an incumbent, Bell won the election and continued serving District 26 seat B. On November 7, 2006, as an incumbent, Bell won the election and continued serving District 26 seat B. On November 4, 2008, as an incumbent, Bell won the election and continued serving District 26 seat B. On November 2, 2010, as an incumbent, Bell won the election and continued serving District 26 seat B. Bell defeated Cindy Shotwell.

On November 6, 2012, Bell was reelected to the Idaho House of Representatives for District 25 seat A. On November 4, 2014, as an incumbent, Bell won the election and continued serving District 25 seat A. On May 17, 2016, Reggy Sternes challenged Bell during the Republican Primary Election but he was defeated. On November 8, 2016, as an incumbent, Bell on the election and continued serving District 25 seat A. In 2018, Bell did not seek for a seat in District 25 seat A.

In December 2018, Bell retired from Idaho House of Representatives after having served for fifteen terms. During the 2022 elections, she served as treasurer for Phil McGrane's campaign for secretary of state of Idaho.

== Election history ==
District 25 House Seat A - Jerome County and part of Twin Falls County
Year	Candidate	Votes	Pct	Candidate	Votes	Pct
2012 Primary	Maxine Bell (incumbent)	4,275	100%			
2012 General	Maxine Bell (incumbent)	14,035	100%			
2014 Primary	Maxine Bell (incumbent)	3,855	100%			
2014 General	Maxine Bell (incumbent)	9,430	100%			
2016 Primary	Maxine Bell (incumbent)	3,267	68.6%	Reggy Sternes	1,493	31.4%
2016 General	Maxine Bell (incumbent)	14,839	100%			

== Awards ==
- 2018 Jean'ne M. Shreeve NSF EPSCoR Research Excellence Award. (December 6, 2018). Presented by Idaho Established Program to Stimulate Competitive Research (EPSCoR). First recipient who is a non-professor.

== Personal life ==
Bell and her husband Jack have three sons.
