= Brent Reinke =

American politician

Member-elect of the Idaho Senate from the 24th district
- Assuming office December 2026
- Succeeding: Glenneda Zuiderveld

Personal details
- Party: Republican

Brent Reinke is an American politician. A member of the Republican Party, he is the member-elect for the 24th district of the Idaho Senate.
