= Carl Bjerke =

American politician

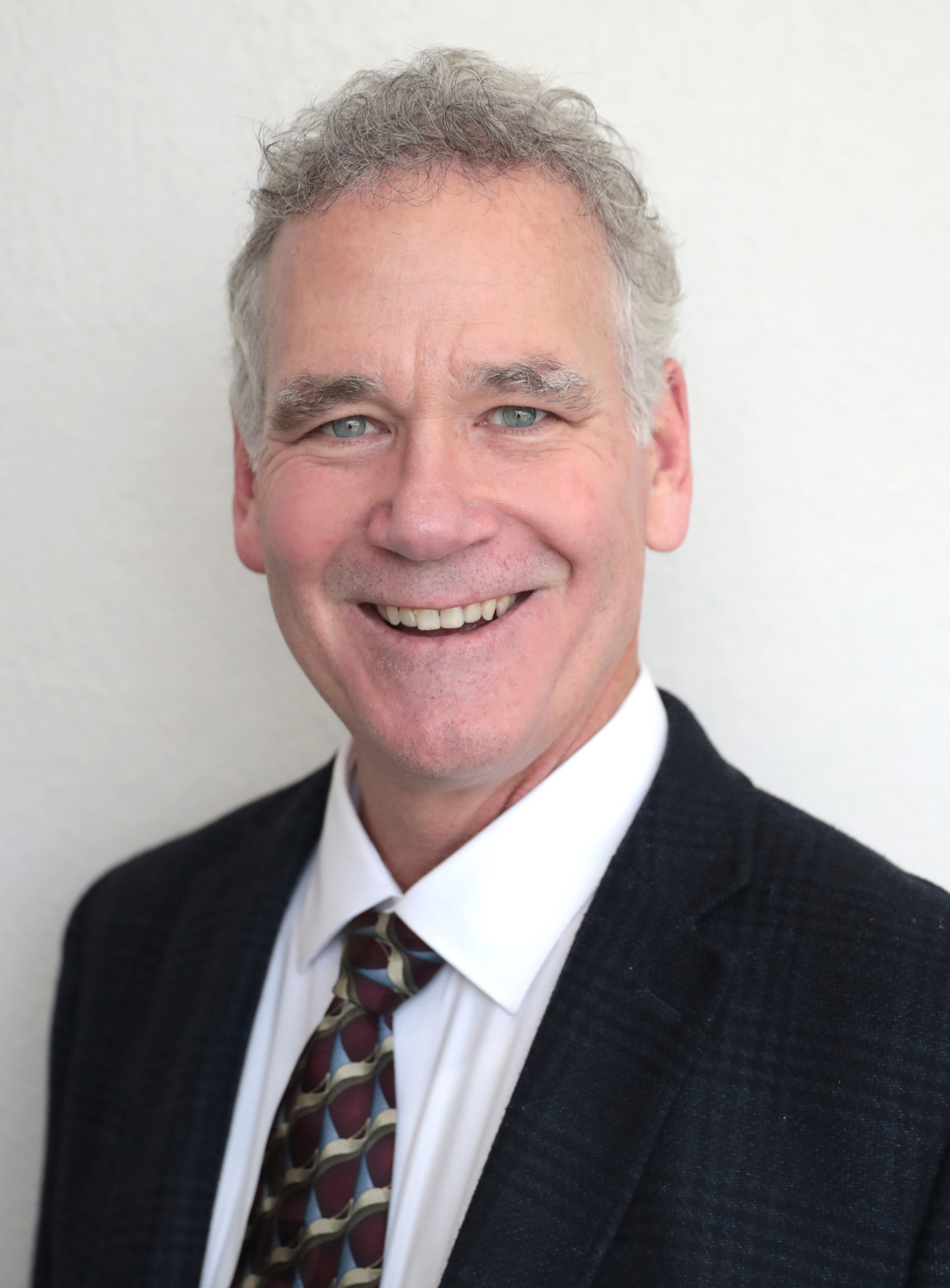

Member of the Idaho Senate from the 5th district
- Incumbent
- Assumed office December 1, 2022
- Preceded by: David Nelson

Personal details
- Born: 1962 (age 63–64) Long Beach, California, U.S.
- Party: Republican
- Children: 2

Carl Bjerke (born 1962) is an American politician and retired firefighter serving as a member of the Idaho Senate for the 5th district. He assumed office on December 1, 2022.

== Early life and education ==
Bjerke was born in Long Beach, California. He earned an associate of science degree in respiratory therapy and a Bachelor of Science in organizational leadership.

== Career ==
Bjerke worked as a respiratory therapist and mortician apprentice before joining the Santa Monica Fire Department in 1987. He retired as the department's deputy chief of operations after 32 years. Bjerke and his wife purchased land in Kootenai County, Idaho, in 2014 and relocated in 2016. Bjerke is also a fire technology instructor at the College of Eastern Idaho. He was elected to the Idaho Senate in November 2022, defeating Peter Riggs.
