= Edgar Malepeai =

American educator and politician (born 1950)

Minority Leader of the Idaho Senate
- In office 2010–2012
- Preceded by: Kate Kelly
- Succeeded by: Michelle Stennett

Member of the Idaho Senate from District 30
- In office December 1, 2002 – December 1, 2012
- Preceded by: Mel Richardson (redistricting)
- Succeeded by: Dean Mortimer (redistricting)

Personal details
- Born: August 7, 1950 (age 76) American Samoa
- Party: Democratic
- Spouse: Brenda (died 2009)
- Education: Idaho State University
- Occupation: Educator, politician

Edgar J. Malepeai (born August 7, 1950) is a Democratic politician from Pocatello, Idaho. He served as an Idaho State Senator from the Bannock County-based District 30 from 2002 to 2012. During his final two years in the Idaho Senate Malepeai served as minority leader.

Malepeai was born in American Samoa and graduated from high school in South San Francisco, California. He moved to Pocatello in the 1970s to attend Idaho State University, where he played football and rugby. After graduation, Malepeai worked as a government teacher at Highland High School. Malepeai also works as a football official in Big Sky Conference games.

Malepeai previously served on the Pocatello City Council and as chair of the Bannock County Democratic Party. He was first elected to the Idaho Senate in 2002 with 64.6 percent of the vote. He ran unopposed for reelection in 2004, 2006 and 2008. Malepeai also has previous service representing Idaho on the Democratic National Committee.

Malepeai missed the 2007 and 2008 legislative sessions while caring for his wife, Brenda, who suffered from a rare form of cancer. Brenda Malepeai died in March 2009.

In 2010 Malepeai faced Republican opposition for the first time since his initial state senate run eight years earlier. Malepeai was reelected to a fifth term with 54.6 percent of the vote. Malepeai was not a candidate for reelection in 2012.
