= Kate Kelly (politician) =

American politician

Minority Leader of the Idaho Senate
- In office 2009–2010
- Preceded by: Clint Stennett
- Succeeded by: Edgar Malepeai

Member of the Idaho Senate from District 18
- In office December 1, 2004 – December 1, 2010
- Preceded by: Sheila Sorensen
- Succeeded by: Mitch Toryanski

Personal details
- Party: Democratic
- Education: George Mason University; University of Idaho College of Mines; University of Utah College of Law; Boise State University; Darden Graduate School of Business Administration
- Profession: Lawyer

Kate Kelly is an American politician who served as Idaho State Senator from the Ada County-based District 18 from 2004 to 2010. She is a member of the Democratic Party.

== Career ==
In January 2009, she succeeded Senator Clint Stennett of Ketchum as Idaho Senate minority leader after Stennett's announcement that he would miss all of the 2009 legislative session while battling brain cancer.

Kelly was previously the assistant minority leader in the Idaho Senate, Deputy Attorney General for the State of Idaho, and a senior manager at the Idaho Department of Environmental Quality.

In December 2010, she became the Director of the Office of Ecosystems, Tribal & Public Affairs at the Environmental Protection Agency's Region 10 office in Seattle.

== Elections ==
She did not seek re-election in 2010 and cited financial restrictions as her reasoning for her retirement from public office.

Kelly has stated that she raised approximately $80,000 in funding each time she campaigned for election and re-election.

=== 2004 ===
Kelly was unopposed in the Democratic primary. She defeated Republican nominee Dave Baumann in the general election with 54.9% of the vote.

=== 2006 ===
Kelly was unopposed in the Democratic primary. She defeated Republican nominee Brad Bolicek in the general election with 63.01% of the vote.

=== 2008 ===
Kelly was unopposed in the Democratic primary. She defeated Republican nominee Dean E. Sorensen in the general election with 59.5% of the vote.
