= Ron Taylor (politician) =

American politician

Member of the Idaho Senate from the 26th district
- Incumbent
- Assumed office December 1, 2022
- Preceded by: Michelle Stennett

Personal details
- Born: March 23, 1964 (age 62) Salt Lake City, Utah, U.S.
- Party: Democratic
- Education: University of Utah

Ron Taylor is an American politician. He serves as a Democratic member for the 26th district of the Idaho Senate.

== Life and career ==
Taylor was born in Salt Lake City, Utah. He attended the University of Utah.

Taylor moved to Idaho in 1982. He joined the Wood River Fire & Rescue as a firefighter, paramedic, and, eventually, Captain of the Fire Department.

In November 2022, Taylor defeated state Representative Laurie Lickley in the general election for the 26th district of the Idaho Senate, winning 52 percent of the vote. He assumed office on December 1, 2022.

In 2024, Lickley ran again. Taylor won the general election by 367 votes. 10% of the vote was won by far right candidate Karla Tate, who was described as a spoiler.
