= Scott Herndon =

American politician from Idaho

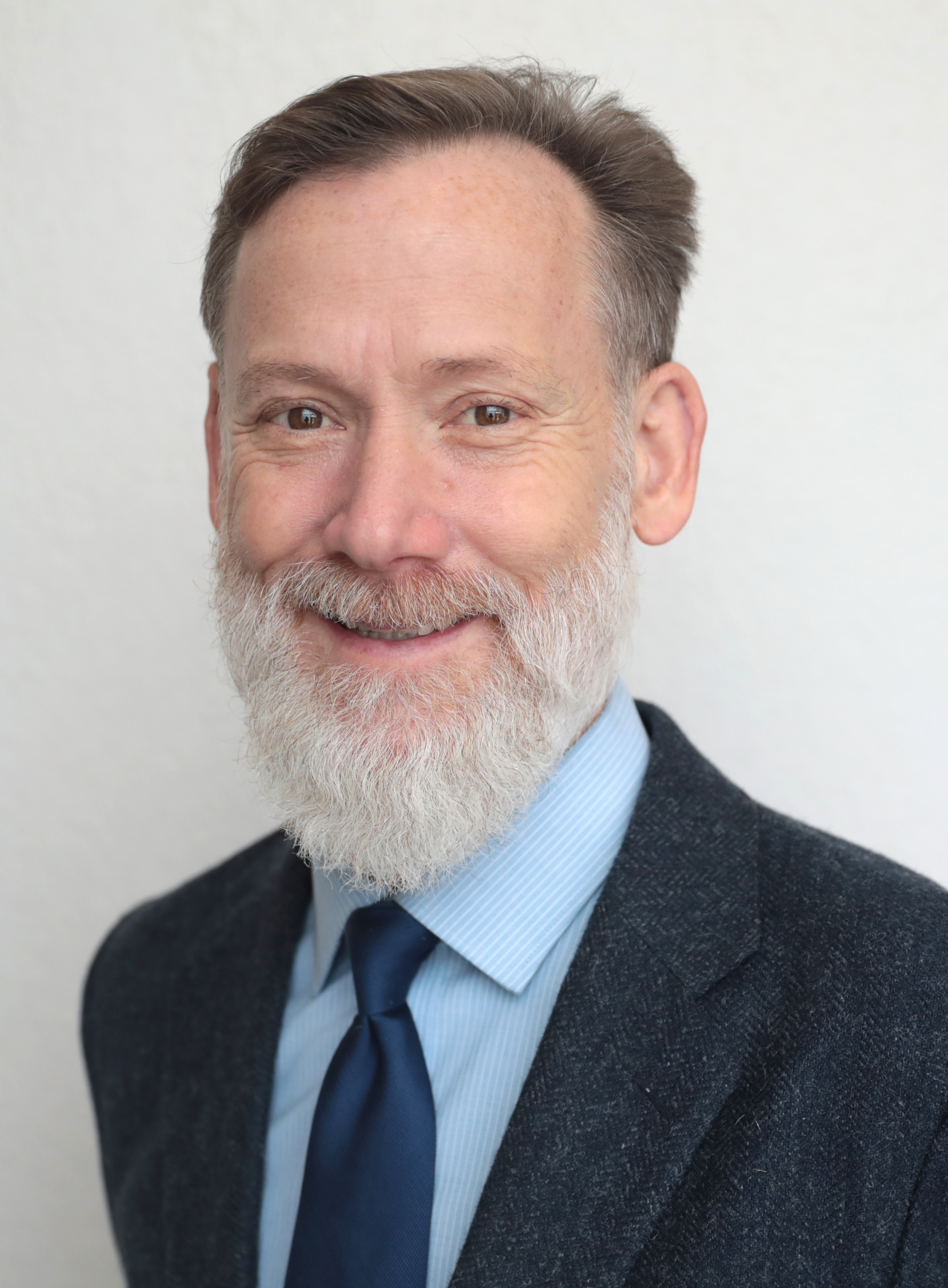

Member of the Idaho Senate from the 1st district
- In office December 1, 2022 – November 30, 2024
- Preceded by: Jim Woodward
- Succeeded by: Jim Woodward

Personal details
- Born: Scott Michael Herndon; November 3, 1967 (age 58) Richmond, Virginia, U.S.
- Party: Republican
- Education: Arizona State University

Scott Michael Herndon is a former American politician who served as a Republican member of the Idaho Senate from the 1st district. Herndon assumed office on December 1, 2022, after defeating incumbent Jim Woodward in the Republican primary and independent candidate Steve Johnson in the November Senate election. Herndon first ran for the state Senate in 2018, but lost the primary to Woodward. He won a rematch in 2022. He ran for re-election in 2024 but was defeated by Jim Woodward in the primary.

Herndon is a born again Christian. In January 2023, he introduced legislation to eliminate marriage licenses and instead directed officiants to issue marriage certificates following a ceremony between "two qualified people, a man, and a woman". Representative Ilana Rubel said the bill appears to codify that "there would only be marriage recognized between a man and a woman" in Idaho, which would violate Obergefell v. Hodges, the U.S. Supreme Court case guaranteeing same-sex marriage in the United States. He advocates for "restrain[t] encroachments on individual liberty from all levels of civil government". He opposes abortion, even in cases of rape and incest.. After Idaho passed the fetal heartbeat bill in 2022, Herndon fought to have rape and incest removed as exceptions for abortions, a measure which ultimately failed in the legislature.
