= Alison Rabe =

American politician

Ali Rabe

Member of the Idaho Senate
- Incumbent
- Assumed office December 1, 2022
- Preceded by: Grant Burgoyne
- Constituency: 16th district
- In office December 1, 2020 – November 5, 2021
- Preceded by: Maryanne Jordan
- Succeeded by: Carrie Semmelroth
- Constituency: 17th district

Personal details
- Born: Alison Rabe Boise, Idaho, U.S.
- Party: Democratic
- Education: College of Idaho (BA); College of William & Mary (JD)

Alison "Ali" Rabe is an American politician and attorney who has been a member of the Idaho Senate for the 16th district since 2022, having previously represented the 17th district from December 2020 to November 2021.

== Early life and education ==
Rabe was born in Boise, Idaho, and raised in Middleton, Idaho. She earned a Bachelor of Arts from the College of Idaho and a Juris Doctor from the William & Mary Law School.

== Career ==
During law school, Rabe was an intern in the United States Senate. In 2011, she was a peace-building fellow with the International Bridges to Justice in Cambodia. She also worked as a law clerk in the Norfolk, Virginia Public Defender's Office. In 2012, she was a legal fellow in the United Nations Office on Drugs and Crime. After working as a legal fellow in Washington, D.C., she became an asylum officer with the United States Citizenship and Immigration Services in San Francisco.

From 2017 to 2019, she was a staff attorney at Homebase, a non-profit public interest law firm based in San Francisco. In 2019, Rabe returned to Boise, Idaho, where she became the executive director of Jesse Tree, a non-profit social services organization that provides legal representation to homeless individuals in the Treasure Valley region.

== Elections ==
Rabe was a candidate for the 17th district in the Idaho Senate. Rabe defeated Adriel J. Martinez in the Democratic primary with 75.82% of the vote. On November 5, 2021, Rabe announced that she was moving outside of District 17 and would be unable to finish her term in the Senate.

Rabe was a candidate for the 16th district in the Idaho Senate. Rabe defeated Republican nominee Gary Smith in the November general election with 61.8% of the vote.
