= Dan G. Johnson =

American politician from Idaho

Mayor of Lewiston
- Incumbent
- Assumed office January 10, 2022
- Preceded by: Michael Collins

Idaho State Senator
- In office December 11, 2011 – November 30, 2022
- Preceded by: Joe Stegner
- Succeeded by: Dan Foreman (redistricting)
- Constituency: 7th district (2011–2012); 6th district (2012–2022)

Personal details
- Born: Salina, Kansas
- Party: Republican
- Education: University of Idaho; Virginia Tech
- Website: idaho4johnson.com

Dan G. Johnson (born in Salina, Kansas) is a Republican former Idaho State Senator who represented Districts 6 and 7 and the current mayor of Lewiston, Idaho.

== Early life ==
Johnson earned his bachelor's degree in forest management from the University of Idaho and his master's degree in forest economics from Virginia Tech.

== Career ==
2012 Redistricted to District 6, and with Senator Dan Schmidt redistricted to District 5, Johnson won the May 15, 2012, Republican primary election with 1,968 votes (59.6%), against Representative Jeff Nesset, who had also been redistricted. Johnson won the November 6, 2012, general election with 10,168 votes (55.4%) against Democratic nominee John Bradbury.

Johnson on November 19, 2020, announced that he would run for Pro tempore of Idaho House of Representatives to replace retiring Brent Hill, losing to Chuck Winder.

Johnson was elected Mayor of Lewiston, Idaho in the November 2021 election.
