= Laurie Lickley =

American rancher and politician from Idaho

Member of the Idaho House of Representatives from the 25 Seat A district
- In office December 1, 2018 – November 30, 2022
- Preceded by: Maxine Bell
- Succeeded by: Lance Clow (redistricting)

Personal details
- Born: Salmon, Idaho
- Party: Republican
- Spouse: Bill
- Children: 2
- Education: University of Idaho
- Occupation: Rancher, politician

Laurie Lickley (née Johnson) is an American politician and rancher from Idaho. Lickley is a former Republican member of the Idaho House of Representatives from District 25A.

== Early life ==
Lickley was born in Salmon, Idaho. In 1986, Lickley graduated from Salmon High School.

== Education ==
In 1990, Lickley earned a Bachelor of Science degree in agricultural economics from the University of Idaho.

== Career ==
Lickley is a rancher in Idaho.

In November 2015, Lickley began serving as the President of Idaho Cattle Association.

On May 15, 2018, Lickley won the Republican Primary Election for Idaho House of Representatives. Lickley sought a seat in District 25 seat A. Lickley defeated B. Roy Prescott and Glenneda Zuiderveld with 49.8% if the votes.

On November 6, 2018, Lickley won the election and became a Republican member of Idaho House of Representatives for District 25 Seat A. Lickley succeeded Maxine Bell, who served in Idaho House of Representatives for 30 years.

In legislation, Lickley is a member of the Environment, Energy, & Technology Committee, Health & Welfare Committee, and Resources & Conservation Committee.

In 2022, Lickley ran for the Idaho state Senate. She was defeated in an upset.

In November 2024, Lickley narrowly lost the state Senate race against Ron Taylor (D) and Kayla Tate (I) in the general election. Taylor won with the help of Idaho Freedom Foundation's PAC and far-right operatives who uses Tate to take votes away from the Republican candidate.

== Awards ==
- 2004 Idaho Cattle Woman of the Year.

== Personal life ==
Lickley's husband is Bill, a rancher. They have two children, Valene and Cole. Lickley and her family live outside of Jerome, Idaho.
