= Robert Blair (farmer) =

American farmer and precision agriculturist

Robert Blair is a United States farmer, specializing in precision agriculture, remote sensing, and Unmanned Air Vehicles (UAV). Blair is a graduate of Lapwai High School and the University of Idaho. Blair grew up on a farm near Kendrick, Idaho and currently manages it.

In 2004 Blair incorporated precision farming equipment to his operation to reduce costs, increase productivity, and to reduce environmental impact. In 2006 Blair added a UAV to his farming operation and started a company based around these technologies. Blair's efforts with precision agriculture and UAVs has led him to be an expert on UAV use for agriculture and to speak at agriculture functions in the United States.

Blair played basketball at Kendrick High School winning the 1985 Idaho A4 championship still holding two tournament team records and at Lapwai High School winning the 1987 A3 Idaho championship and belonging to the longest basketball winning streak in Idaho history at 81 games.

Blair currently resides on the family farm and serves as an executive board member for the Idaho Grain Producers Association and is an Idaho Farm Bureau Federation county president.

== Awards ==
- 2013 Idaho Governor's Award for Excellence in Agriculture: Technology & Innovation
- 2013 University of Idaho Land Grant Legacy
- 2012 McCloy Agriculture Fellowship
- 2011 Eisenhower Fellowships Agriculture Fellow
- 2009 Precision Ag Institute - Farmer of the Year
