= Jim Woodward (politician) =

American politician

Member of the Idaho Senate from the 1st district
- Incumbent
- Assumed office December 1, 2024
- Preceded by: Scott Herndon
- In office December 1, 2018 – November 30, 2022
- Preceded by: Shawn Keough
- Succeeded by: Scott Herndon

Personal details
- Party: Republican
- Spouse: Brenda
- Children: 2
- Education: University of Idaho

James W. Woodward is an American politician. A Republican, he represented District 1 in the Idaho State Senate from 2018 to 2022.

Woodward was born and raised in Bonners Ferry. He attended and graduated from the University of Idaho. He is a United States Navy veteran.

Woodward was elected to represent District 1 in the Idaho State Senate in 2018, after the retirement of his predecessor Shawn Keough, who endorsed him. While in office, he sat on the Education and Finance committees.

In 2022, Woodward lost the Republican primary election for District 1 to Scott Herndon.

In 2024, Woodward defeated Herndon in the District 1 primary election.

== Electoral record ==
2018 Republican primary election: Idaho State Senate, District 1
Party	Candidate	Votes	%
Republican	Jim Woodward	4,575	52.0%
Republican	Danielle Ahrens	2,251	25.6%
Republican	Scott Herndon	1,966	22.4%

2018 general election: Idaho State Senate, District 1
Party	Candidate	Votes	%
Republican	Jim Woodward	14,831	74.3%
Democratic	Vera Gadman	5,125	25.7%

2022 Republican primary election: Idaho State Senate, District 1
Party	Candidate	Votes	%
Republican	Scott Herndon	7,771	56.2%
Republican	Jim Woodward	6,064	43.8%
