= Geoff Schroeder =

American Politician from Idaho

Idaho State Senator
- In office December 1, 2022 – November 30, 2024
- Preceded by: Steven Thayn (redistricting)
- Succeeded by: Christy Zito
- Constituency: 8th District

Personal details
- Party: Republican

Geoffrey Schroeder was a state senator in the U.S. state of Idaho. He has held office from 2022 to 2024, and became more active in the Republican party in 2010. He represented Idaho's 8th district, representing Boise, Custer, Elmore, and Valley counties. His political career began when he ran for the first of four terms and served as precinct committeeman for the Elmore County Republican Party. He was elected vice-chair of the county party in 2014 and served as Legislative District 23 Chair from 2014-2016. Schroeder lost his 2024 Republican primary election to former Rep. Christy Zito.

Schroeder was raised in Kamiah, Idaho, and served in the Idaho Army National Guard from 1986 to 2007. He was a regional recruiting supervisor while serving in the Idaho National Guard. He graduated from Kamiah High School (1984); attended University of Idaho (1986-1989).
