= Carrie Semmelroth =

American politician

Member of the Idaho Senate from the 17th district
- Incumbent
- Assumed office November 24, 2021
- Preceded by: Alison Rabe

Personal details
- Party: Democratic
- Education: Boise State University (BA, MS, EdD)

Carrie Semmelroth is an American politician and academic serving as a member of the Idaho Senate from the 17th district. She assumed office on November 24, 2021, succeeding Alison Rabe.

== Education ==
Semmelroth earned a Bachelor of Arts degree in sociology, Master of Science in special education, and Doctor of Education in curriculum and instruction from Boise State University.

== Career ==
She was previously a candidate for the Idaho House of Representatives in 2014, losing in the Democratic primary to incumbent John Gannon. She works at the Boise State University College of Education.
