= Lee Heider =

American politician from Idaho

Member of the Idaho Senate from District 24
- In office December 1, 2010 – November 30, 2022
- Preceded by: Charles Coiner
- Succeeded by: Glenneda Zuiderveld (redistricting)

Personal details
- Born: February 17, 1947 (age 79) Twin Falls, Idaho
- Party: Republican
- Spouse: Jan
- Children: 6
- Profession: Flooring Company Owner

Lee Heider (born February 17, 1947) is a former Republican member of the Idaho Senate, first elected in 2010. Heider represented the 24th District, which contains most of the city of Twin Falls.

== Early life and career ==
Heider was born and raised in Twin Falls. He is married to Jan, has six children, and 22 grandchildren. He is owner of a flooring company in Twin Falls and served in the United States Air Force. Heider holds a bachelor's degree from Brigham Young University and a Master of Public Administration from Ball State University.

Previously Heider served as a member of the Twin Falls City Council and as vice mayor of Twin Falls.

== Idaho Senate ==
In the Idaho Senate Heider is a member of the following committees:

- Health and Welfare
- Resources and Environment (chair)

== Elections ==
District 24 Senate - Part of Twin Falls County
Year	Candidate	Votes	Pct	Candidate	Votes	Pct
2010 Primary	Lee Heider	2,630	57.2%	Charles Coiner (incumbent)	1,965	42.8%
2010 General	Lee Heider	8,566	100%			
2012 Primary	Lee Heider (incumbent)	3,052	100%			
2012 General	Lee Heider (incumbent)	10,003	64.3%	Pat Marcantonio	5,545	35.7%
2014 Primary	Lee Heider (incumbent)	2,767	100%			
2014 General	Lee Heider (incumbent)	6,687	64.6%	Shelley Gardner	3,660	35.4%
2016 Primary	Lee Heider (incumbent)	3,082	100%			
2016 General	Lee Heider (incumbent)	10,698	64.1%	Deborah Silver	6,004	35.9%

== Awards ==
- Eagle Scout and Silver Beaver, Boy Scouts of America
