= Chris Trakel =

American politician

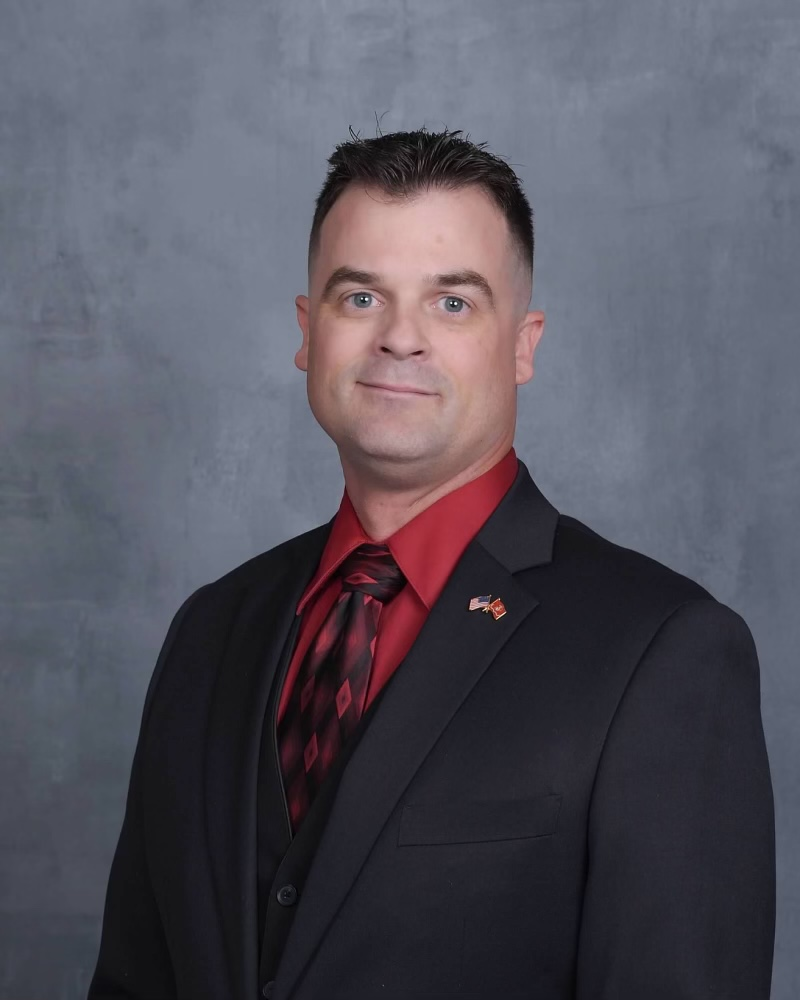

Member of the Idaho Senate from the 11th district
- In office December 1, 2022 – December 1, 2024
- Preceded by: Patti Anne Lodge
- Succeeded by: Camille Blaylock

Personal details
- Born: Boise, Idaho, U.S.
- Party: Republican
- Children: 3

Military service
- Branch/service: United States Marine Corps
- Years of service: 2001–2016
- Rank: Staff Sergeant
- Battles/wars: Iraq War; War in Afghanistan

Christopher T. Trakel. is an American politician who served as a member of the Idaho Senate for the 11th district for one term.

== Early life and education ==
Trakel was born in Boise, Idaho, and graduated from Meridian High School in 2000.

== Career ==
In March 2001, Trakel enlisted in the United States Marine Corps as a rifleman. Trakel was deployed to Iraq with the 2nd Battalion, 7th Marines and Afghanistan with the 2nd Battalion, 4th Marines before retiring in 2016 as a staff sergeant. Trakel later moved to Caldwell, Idaho, and founded a woodworking business. He was elected to the Idaho Senate in November 2022.
