= Steven Thayn =

American politician from Idaho

Steven P. Thayn

Member of the Idaho Senate from District 8
- In office December 1, 2012 – November 30, 2022
- Preceded by: Sheryl Nuxoll
- Succeeded by: Geoff Schroeder (redistricting)

Member of the Idaho House of Representatives from District 11 Seat A
- In office December 1, 2006 – November 30, 2012
- Preceded by: Kathy Skippen
- Succeeded by: Gayle Batt (redistricting)

Personal details
- Born: January 30, 1954 (age 72) Richland, Washington
- Party: Republican
- Spouse: Sheryll
- Children: 8
- Education: Treasure Valley Community College; Boise State University
- Profession: Teacher, farmer
- Website: steventhayn.com

Steven P. Thayn (born January 30, 1954, in Richland, Washington) was an American Republican politician who served has Idaho State Senator representing District 8 from 2012-2022. Previously, he served in the Idaho State House of Representatives, from 2007 to 2012. He was candidate for Idaho Republican Party Chair at the 2026 Convention, taking second place with only 155 votes.

== Education ==
Thayn graduated from Emmett High School, attended Treasure Valley Community College, and earned his teacher's certification and bachelor's degree in political science from Boise State University.

== Elections ==
District 11 Senate - Gem County and part of Canyon County
Year	Candidate	Votes	Pct	Candidate	Votes	Pct	Candidate	Votes	Pct
2004 Primary	Brad Little (incumbent)	3,402	65.0%	Steven Thayn	1,398	26.7%	Walt Bayes	434	8.3%

District 11 House Seat A - Gem County and part of Canyon County
Year	Candidate	Votes	Pct	Candidate	Votes	Pct	Candidate	Votes	Pct
2006 Primary	Steven Thayn	2,759	52.3%	Kathy Skippen (incumbent)	2,513	47.7%			
2006 General	Steven Thayn	9,294	75.4%	Kirsten Faith Richardson	3,026	24.6%			
2008 Primary	Steven Thayn (incumbent)	2,074	38.3%	Matt Beebe	1,677	30.9%	Gary Bauer	1,670	30.8%
2008 General	Steven Thayn (incumbent)	11,538	59.9%	Bob Solomon	7,724	40.1%			
2010 Primary	Steven Thayn (incumbent)	3,464	65.1%	Mike Pullin	1,856	34.9%			
2010 General	Steven Thayn (incumbent)	11,687	100%						

District 8 Senate - Boise, Custer, Gem, Lemhi, and Valley Counties
Year	Candidate	Votes	Pct	Candidate	Votes	Pct	Candidate	Votes	Pct
2012 Primary	Steven Thayn	3,312	44.6%	Alan Ward	2,065	27.8%	Terry Gestrin	2,053	27.6%
2012 General	Steven Thayn	13,068	61.0%	Joanna Clausen	6,656	31.0%	Kirsten Faith Richardson	1,713	8.0%
2014 Primary	Steven Thayn (incumbent)	6,389	100.0%						
2014 General	Steven Thayn (incumbent)	10,675	71.4%	Kirsten Faith Richardson	4,266	28.6%			
2016 Primary	Steven Thayn (incumbent)	5,921	100.0%						
2016 General	Steven Thayn (incumbent)	16,015	75.5%	Kirsten Faith Richardson	4,826	22.7%	William Sifford (W/I)	377	1.8%
2018 Primary	Steven Thayn (incumbent)	4,568	55.8%	Marla Lawson	3,620	44.2%			
2018 General	Steven Thayn (incumbent)	14,128	71.0%	Bill Sifford	4,510	22.7%	Kirsten Faith Richardson	1,265	6.4%
