= Clint Stennett =

American politician from Idaho

Member of the Idaho Senate from District 25
- In office December 1, 2002 – October 14, 2010
- Preceded by: Denton Darrington
- Succeeded by: Michelle Stennett

Member of the Idaho Senate from District 21
- In office December 1, 1994 – December 1, 2002
- Preceded by: John Peavey
- Succeeded by: Jack Noble

Member of the Idaho House of Representatives from District 21 Seat A
- In office December 1, 1992 – December 1, 1994
- Preceded by: Al Lance
- Succeeded by: Wendy Jaquet

Member of the Idaho House of Representatives from District 22 Seat A
- In office December 1, 1990 – December 1, 1992
- Preceded by: Tom Morrison
- Succeeded by: Celia Gould

Personal details
- Born: October 1, 1956 Winona, Minnesota
- Died: October 14, 2010 (aged 54) Ketchum, Idaho
- Party: Democratic
- Spouse: Michelle
- Education: Idaho State University
- Profession: Businessman

W. Clinton "Clint" Stennett (October 1, 1956 – October 14, 2010) was a Democratic politician and a minority leader of the Idaho Senate. Stennett represented District 25, which includes Blaine, Gooding, Camas and Lincoln Counties. Stennett served in the Idaho Senate from 1994 to 2010, but was unable to fulfill his duties after the 2008 session due to poor health. He served as the minority leader from 1999 to 2009. He previously served in the Idaho House from 1990 through 1994.

Stennett was president of E-da-Ha Inc., which owns television stations in Sun Valley, Twin Falls and McCall.

As one of the state's most prominent Democrats, Stennett had been mentioned as a potential candidate for governor in 2006. However, he chose stand for reelection to the Idaho Senate instead. Stennett ran in the general election unopposed as no challenger filed to run against him. Stennett again ran for reelection unopposed in 2008.

== Illness and death ==
In January 2008 Stennett underwent surgery in Boise to address minor brain swelling. Although Stennett took a leave of absence from the Legislature, he was initially expected to make a full recovery and return to the Idaho Senate before the end of the 2008 session.

However, Stennett was diagnosed with brain cancer. Despite being reelected in 2008 he missed all of the 2009 and 2010 legislative sessions. He was succeeded as minority leader in January 2009 by Sen. Kate Kelly of Boise. Former Sun Valley mayor Jon Thorson took Stennett's place in the Idaho Legislature during the 2009 session. Michelle Stennett, his wife, was appointed as District 25's acting state senator by Gov. Butch Otter for the 2010 session. Stennett was forced to retire from the Idaho Senate in March 2010 due to his deteriorating condition.

Stennett resided in Ketchum until his death in October 2010. Michelle Stennett won election to his former seat the following month.
