= Regina Bayer =

American politician

Member of the Idaho Senate from District 21
- In office January 25, 2019 – November 30, 2022
- Preceded by: Cliff Bayer
- Succeeded by: Treg Bernt

Regina Bayer is an American politician who served as a member of the Idaho Senate for the 21st district. Bayer was appointed by Governor Brad Little to fill the seat vacated by her son, Senator Cliff Bayer, who left to become the chief of staff to U.S. Representative Russ Fulcher.

Bayer served on the Health & Welfare and Agricultural Affairs committees during the 2019–2020 legislative session.
