= Glenneda Zuiderveld =

2020's US politician

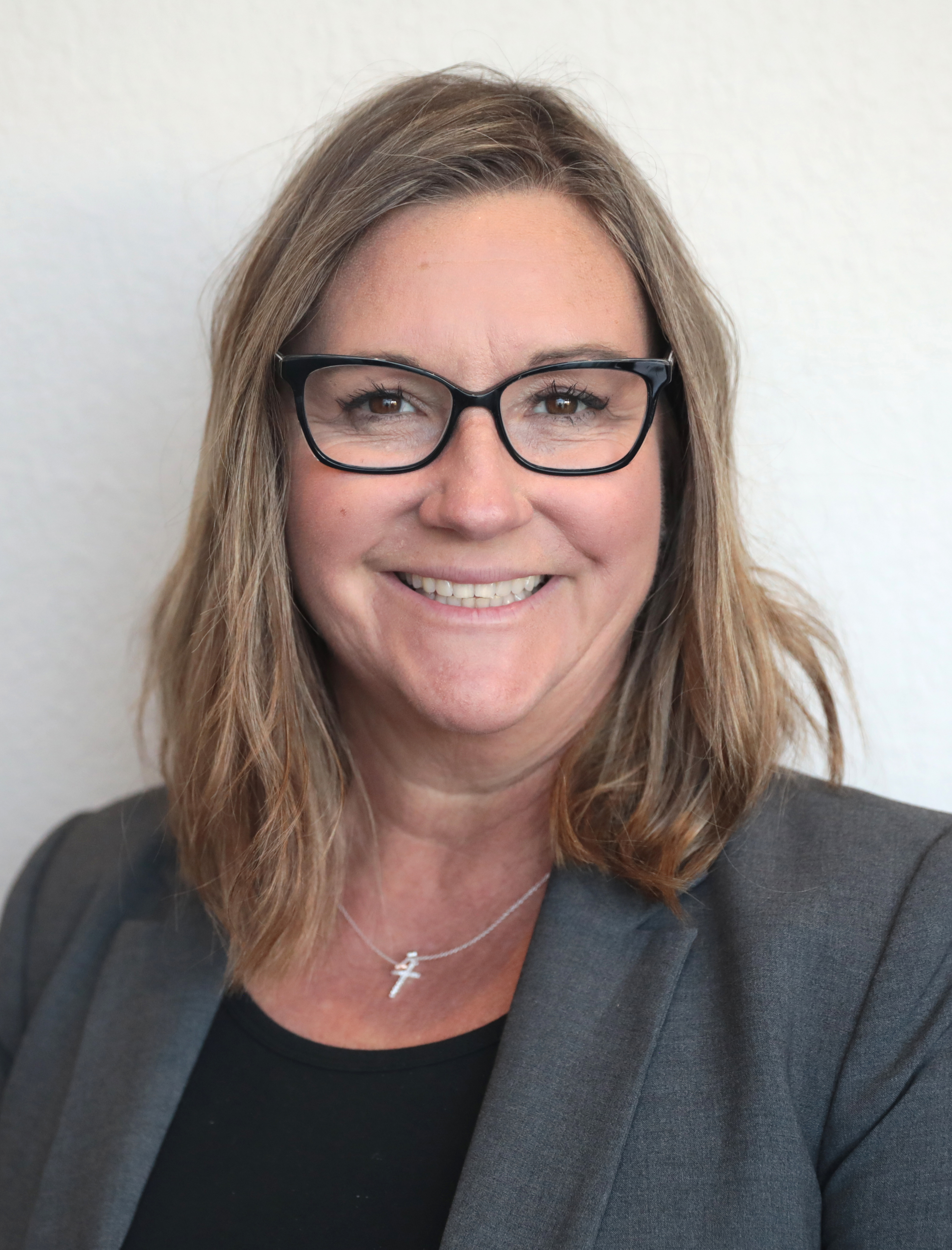

Member of the Idaho Senate from the 24th district
- Incumbent
- Assumed office December 1, 2022
- Preceded by: Lee Heider
- Succeeded by: Brent Reinke (elect)

Personal details
- Party: Republican
- Children: 3

Glenneda Zuiderveld is an American politician serving as a member of the Idaho Senate for the 24th district. She assumed office on December 1, 2022.

== Early life ==
A native of Jerome, Idaho, Zuiderveld graduated from Jerome High School.

== Career ==
Outside of politics, Zuiderveld has worked in the agriculture industry for over 30 years. She was elected to the Idaho Senate in November 2022 and assumed office on December 1, 2022. She also serves as vice chair of the Senate Health & Welfare Committee.

Sen. Zuiderveld was elected with the help of the Magic Valley Liberty Alliance and Citizens Alliance of Idaho.

Zuiderdveld was defeated by challenger Brent Reinke in the Idaho primary election on May 19, 2026.
