= Idaho's 25th legislative district =

American legislative district

Idaho's 25th legislative district is one of 35 districts of the Idaho Legislature. It is currently represented by Senator Jim Patrick, Republican of Twin Falls, Representative Laurie Lickley, Republican of Jerome, and Representative Clark Kauffman, Republican of Filer.

== District profile ==
=== 1984–1992 ===
From 1984 to 1992, District 25 was a floterial district that contained Districts 22, 23, and 24. District 25 consisted of Blaine, Camas, Cassia, Gooding, Jerome, Lincoln, Minidoka, and Twin Falls Counties.

Legislature	Session	Senate	House Seat A	House Seat B
47th (1984 - 1986)	1st	Larrey Anderson (R)	Jerry Callen (R)	Jeff Stoker (R)
47th (1984 - 1986)	2nd	Larrey Anderson (R)	Jerry Callen (R)	Jeff Stoker (R)
48th (1986 - 1988)	1st	Larrey Anderson (R)	Jerry Callen (R)	Ralph Peters (R)
48th (1986 - 1988)	2nd	Larrey Anderson (R)	Jerry Callen (R)	Ralph Peters (R)
49th (1988 - 1990)	1st	Larrey Anderson (R)	Gary Robbins (R)	Ralph Peters (R)
49th (1988 - 1990)	2nd	Larrey Anderson (R)	Gary Robbins (R)	Ralph Peters (R)
50th (1990 - 1992)	1st	Russell Newcomb (R)	Mark Stubbs (R)	Ralph Peters (R)
50th (1990 - 1992)	2nd	Russell Newcomb (R)	Mark Stubbs (R)	Ralph Peters (R)

=== 1992–2002 ===
From 1992 to 2002, District 25 consisted of Cassia County and a portion of Minidoka and Twin Falls counties.

Legislature	Session	Senate	House Seat A	House Seat B
51st (1992 - 1994)	1st	Denton Darrington (R)	Jim Kempton (R)	Bruce Newcomb (R)
51st (1992 - 1994)	2nd	Denton Darrington (R)	Jim Kempton (R)	Bruce Newcomb (R)
52nd (1994 - 1996)	1st	Denton Darrington (R)	Jim Kempton (R)	Bruce Newcomb (R)
52nd (1994 - 1996)	2nd	Denton Darrington (R)	Jim Kempton (R)	Bruce Newcomb (R)
53rd (1996 - 1998)	1st	Denton Darrington (R)	Jim Kempton (R)	Bruce Newcomb (R)
53rd (1996 - 1998)	2nd	Denton Darrington (R)	Jim Kempton (R)	Bruce Newcomb (R)
54th (1998 - 2000)	1st	Denton Darrington (R)	Jim Kempton (R)	Bruce Newcomb (R)
54th (1998 - 2000)	2nd	Denton Darrington (R)	Jim Kempton (R)	Bruce Newcomb (R)
55th (2000 - 2002)	1st	Denton Darrington (R)	Jim Kempton (R)	Bruce Newcomb (R)
55th (2000 - 2002)	2nd	Denton Darrington (R)	Scott Bedke (R)	Bruce Newcomb (R)

=== 2002–2012 ===
From 2002 to 2012, District 25 consisted of Blaine, Camas, Gooding, and Lincoln Counties.

Legislature	Session	Senate	House Seat A	House Seat B
57th (2002 - 2004)	1st	Clint Stennett (D)	Wendy Jaquet (D)	Tim Ridinger (R)
57th (2002 - 2004)	2nd	Clint Stennett (D)	Wendy Jaquet (D)	Tim Ridinger (R)
58th (2004 - 2006)	1st	Clint Stennett (D)	Wendy Jaquet (D)	Donna Pence (D)
58th (2004 - 2006)	2nd	Clint Stennett (D)	Wendy Jaquet (D)	Donna Pence (D)
59th (2006 - 2008)	1st	Clint Stennett (D)	Wendy Jaquet (D)	Donna Pence (D)
59th (2006 - 2008)	2nd	Clint Stennett (D)	Wendy Jaquet (D)	Donna Pence (D)
60th (2008 - 2010)	1st	Clint Stennett (D)	Wendy Jaquet (D)	Donna Pence (D)
60th (2008 - 2010)	2nd	Clint Stennett (D)	Wendy Jaquet (D)	Donna Pence (D)
61st (2010 - 2012)	1st	Michelle Stennett (D)	Wendy Jaquet (D)	Donna Pence (D)
61st (2010 - 2012)	2nd	Michelle Stennett (D)	Wendy Jaquet (D)	Donna Pence (D)

=== 2012–2022 ===
District 25 currently consists of Jerome County and a portion of Twin Falls County.

Legislature	Session	Senate	House Seat A	House Seat B
62nd (2012 - 2014)	1st	Jim Patrick (R)	Maxine Bell (R)	Clark Kauffman (R)
62nd (2012 - 2014)	2nd	Jim Patrick (R)	Maxine Bell (R)	Clark Kauffman (R)
63rd (2014 - 2016)	1st	Jim Patrick (R)	Maxine Bell (R)	Clark Kauffman (R)
63rd (2014 - 2016)	2nd	Jim Patrick (R)	Maxine Bell (R)	Clark Kauffman (R)
64th (2016 - 2018)	1st	Jim Patrick (R)	Maxine Bell (R)	Clark Kauffman (R)
64th (2016 - 2018)	2nd	Jim Patrick (R)	Maxine Bell (R)	Clark Kauffman (R)
65th (2018 - 2020)	1st	Jim Patrick (R)	Laurie Lickley (R)	Clark Kauffman (R)
65th (2018 - 2020)	2nd	Jim Patrick (R)	Laurie Lickley (R)	Clark Kauffman (R)
66th (2020 - 2022)	1st	Jim Patrick (R)	Laurie Lickley (R)	Clark Kauffman (R)
66th (2020 - 2022)	2nd	Jim Patrick (R)	Laurie Lickley (R)	Clark Kauffman (R)

=== 2022–present ===
Beginning in December 2022, District 25 will consist of a portion Twin Falls County.

Don Hall was appointed in December 2025.

== See also ==
- List of Idaho senators
- List of Idaho representatives
