= Jeff Agenbroad =

American politician from Idaho

Jeff C. Agenbroad

Member of the Idaho Senate from the 13th district
- In office December 1, 2016 – November 30, 2022
- Preceded by: Curt McKenzie
- Succeeded by: Brian Lenney

Personal details
- Born: 1963 or 1964 (age 61–62) Boise, Idaho, U.S.
- Party: Republican
- Spouse: Patricia
- Children: 2
- Education: University of Idaho (BS)

Jeff C. Agenbroad is an American politician and banker who served as a Republican member of the Idaho Senate for the 13th district from 2016 to 2022.

== Early life and education ==
Agenbroad was born in Boise and raised on a farm and ranch in Nampa, where he graduated from Nampa High School.

Agenbroad earned a Bachelor of Science degree in business finance from the University of Idaho in 1986. He studied agricultural finance at Washington State University and banking at the University of Washington.

== Career ==
Agenbroad is a commercial banker by profession, beginning with U.S. Bank in 1986. From 1996 until 2003, he was vice president and area manager with Washington Mutual Bank, and served as owner and vice president of TitleOne from 2003 to 2008. He worked for Zions Bank from 2013 to 2018. Agenbroad also served as treasurer and a board member of the Your Health Idaho.

Agenbroad was installed in the Senate in 2016, replacing former Senator Curt McKenzie. He was co-chairman of the Joint Finance and Appropriations Committee (JFAC).

In 2019, Agenbroad voted in favor of House Bill 180, which established Idaho's Syringe and Needle Exchange Act. The bill passed the Senate 22–11 on March 18, 2019, and was signed into law by Governor Brad Little. The act was repealed in 2024 by House Bill 617, which passed after a police raid on a Boise nonprofit that operated a syringe exchange under the program.

As co-chair of the Joint Finance-Appropriations Committee, Agenbroad carried Senate Bill 1393 in 2020, a Department of Health and Welfare supplemental appropriation that included $16 million in federal funds for the controversial Idaho Health Data Exchange. The exchange filed for bankruptcy in 2022, and a 2023 report by the Legislature's Office of Performance Evaluations found the state had provided insufficient oversight of the nonprofit.

In 2022, he lost in the Idaho Republican primary to Brian Lenney by a margin of 15.2%. In 2024, Agenbroad challenged Lenney again, and lost by a margin of 11.2%.

== Personal life ==
After losing back to back elections, Agenbroad chaired the committee that campaigned to create the Nampa Auditorium District, a taxing district funding the city-owned Nampa Civic Center and Ford Idaho Center. Voters approved it in November 2024 with 61.1% support, establishing a 5% tax on hotel and motel stays within the district.

Agenbroad also founded Integrity 2C, a Nampa organization founded to push moderate Republicans into state office. Later in 2026, he started 2C Values PAC, a Canyon County political committee registered in 2026 that raised $950.

Agenbroad and his wife, Patricia, have two adult children.
