= Dave Lent =

American politician

Dave Lent is an American politician.

== Early life, education, and career ==
Lent is a graduate of Eastern Idaho Technical College and Idaho State University. He worked with the Idaho National Laboratory since the 1980s, winning several awards for regulatory reform and cost-cutting. Lent has also served on advisory boards for the College of Eastern Idaho and Idaho State University.

== Political career ==
Lent served on the Idaho Falls School District 91 Board of Trustees from 2006 to 2018, resigning to take his seat in the Idaho Senate.

Lent ran for the Idaho Senate in 2018, defeating incumbent District 33 senator Tony Potts in the Republican primary. Lent was elected with 60% of the vote over Democrat Jerry Sehlke in the general election.

In the Idaho Senate, Lent serves on the Agricultural Affairs and Education committees. He was appointed by Governor Brad Little to serve on the Western Interstate Commission for Higher Education.
