= Mark Harris (Idaho politician) =

American politician from Idaho

- Incumbent
- Assumed office July 22, 2015
- Preceded by: John Tippets
- Constituency: 32nd district (2015–2022); 35th district (2022–present)

Member of the Idaho Senate

Personal details
- Party: Republican
- Spouse: Cheryl
- Children: 4
- Education: Utah State University (BA)

Mark Harris is an American politician serving as a member of the Idaho Senate from the 32nd district. He assumed office on July 22, 2015.

== Early life and education ==
Harris earned a Bachelor of Arts degree in political science from Utah State University.

== Career ==
When John Tippets resigned his seat for an appointment as director of the Idaho Department of Environmental Quality, the Legislative District 32 Republican Central Committee met to fill the vacancy in the Senate seat, sending three names in order of preference to Governor Butch Otter: Harris, Larry Oja of Malad City, and R. Scott Workman of Preston. Governor Otter appointed Harris to serve the remainder of Tippet's term.

=== Committee assignments ===
- Heath and Welfare Committee
- Transportation Committee

Harris previously served on the Agriculture Affairs Committee in 2016.

== Elections ==
District 32 Senate - Bear Lake, Caribou, Franklin, Oneida, and Teton Counties and part of Bonneville County.
Year	Candidate	Votes	Pct	Candidate	Votes	Pct
2016 Primary	Mark Harris (incumbent)	6,709	100%			
2016 General	Mark Harris (incumbent)	16,168	79.6%	Bob Fitzgerald	4,139	20.4%
