= Idaho's 17th legislative district =

American legislative district

Idaho's 17th legislative district is one of 35 districts of the Idaho Legislature. It is currently represented by Carrie Semmelroth, Democrat of Boise, John Gannon, Democrat of Boise, and Megan Egbert, Democrat.

== District profile ==
=== 2012–present ===
District 17 currently consists of a portion of Ada County.

| Legislature | Session | Senate | House Seat A | House Seat B |
| 62nd (2012 - 2014) | 1st | Elliot Werk (D) | John Gannon (D) | Sue Chew (D), Megan Egbert (D) |
| 62nd (2012 - 2014) | 2nd | Elliot Werk (D) | John Gannon (D) | Sue Chew (D), Megan Egbert (D) |
| 63rd (2014 - 2016) | 1st | Maryanne Jordan (D) | John Gannon (D) | Sue Chew (D), Megan Egbert (D) |
| 63rd (2014 - 2016) | 2nd | Maryanne Jordan (D) | John Gannon (D) | Sue Chew (D), Megan Egbert (D) |
| 64th (2016 - 2018) | 1st | Maryanne Jordan (D) | John Gannon (D) | Sue Chew (D), Megan Egbert (D) |
| 64th (2016 - 2018) | 2nd | Maryanne Jordan (D) | John Gannon (D) | Sue Chew (D), Megan Egbert (D) |
| 65th (2018 - 2020) | 1st | Maryanne Jordan (D) | John Gannon (D) | Sue Chew (D), Megan Egbert (D) |
| 65th (2018 - 2020) | 2nd | Maryanne Jordan (D) | John Gannon (D) | Sue Chew (D), Megan Egbert (D) |
| 66th (2020 - 2022) | 1st | Ali Rabe (D) | John Gannon (D) | Sue Chew (D), Megan Egbert (D) |
| 66th (2020 - 2022) | 2nd | Carrie Semmelroth (D) | John Gannon (D) | Sue Chew (D), Megan Egbert (D) |

=== 2002–2012 ===
From 2002 to 2012, District 17 consisted of a portion of Ada County.

| Legislature | Session | Senate | House Seat A | House Seat B |
| 57th (2002 - 2004) | 1st | Elliot Werk (D) | Kathie Garrett (R) | Janet Miller (R) |
| 57th (2002 - 2004) | 2nd | Elliot Werk (D) | Kathie Garrett (R) | Janet Miller (R) |
| 58th (2004 - 2006) | 1st | Elliot Werk (D) | Kathie Garrett (R) | Janet Miller (R) |
| 58th (2004 - 2006) | 2nd | Elliot Werk (D) | Kathie Garrett (R) | Janet Miller (R) |
| 59th (2006 - 2008) | 1st | Elliot Werk (D) | Bill Killen (D) | Sue Chew (D) |
| 59th (2006 - 2008) | 2nd | Elliot Werk (D) | Bill Killen (D) | Sue Chew (D) |
| 60th (2008 - 2010) | 1st | Elliot Werk (D) | Bill Killen (D) | Sue Chew (D) |
| 60th (2008 - 2010) | 2nd | Elliot Werk (D) | Bill Killen (D) | Sue Chew (D) |
| 61st (2010 - 2012) | 1st | Elliot Werk (D) | Bill Killen (D) | Sue Chew (D) |
| 61st (2010 - 2012) | 2nd | Elliot Werk (D) | Bill Killen (D) | Sue Chew (D) |

=== 1992–2002 ===
From 1992 to 2002, District 17 consisted of a portion of Ada County.

| Legislature | Session | Senate | House Seat A | House Seat B |
| 51st (1992 - 1994) | 1st | Grant Ipsen (R) | Jesse Berain (R) | Ruby Stone (R) |
| 51st (1992 - 1994) | 2nd | Grant Ipsen (R) | Jesse Berain (R) | Ruby Stone (R) |
| 52nd (1994 - 1996) | 1st | Grant Ipsen (R) | Jesse Berain (R) | Ruby Stone (R) |
| 52nd (1994 - 1996) | 2nd | Grant Ipsen (R) | Jesse Berain (R) | Ruby Stone (R) |
| 53rd (1996 - 1998) | 1st | Grant Ipsen (R) | David Callister (R) | Ruby Stone (R) |
| 53rd (1996 - 1998) | 2nd | Grant Ipsen (R) | David Callister (R) | Ruby Stone (R) |
| 54th (1998 - 2000) | 1st | Grant Ipsen (R) | David Callister (R) | Ruby Stone (R) |
| 54th (1998 - 2000) | 2nd | Grant Ipsen (R) | David Callister (R) | Ruby Stone (R) |
| 55th (2000 - 2002) | 1st | Grant Ipsen (R) | David Callister (R) | Ruby Stone (R) |
| 55th (2000 - 2002) | 2nd | Grant Ipsen (R) | David Callister (R) | Ruby Stone (R) |

== See also ==
- List of Idaho senators
- List of Idaho representatives
