= Treg Bernt =

American politician and businessman

Member of the Idaho Senate from the 21st district
- Incumbent
- Assumed office December 1, 2022
- Preceded by: Regina Bayer

Personal details
- Born: March 18, 1976 (age 50) Pocatello, Idaho, U.S.
- Party: Republican
- Children: 3
- Education: Idaho State University (BA)
- Website: https://tregbernt.com/

Treg A. Bernt (born March 18, 1976) is an American politician and businessman serving as a member of the Idaho Senate for the 21st district. He assumed office on December 1, 2022.

== Early life and education ==
Bernt was born and raised in Pocatello, Idaho. He earned a Bachelor of Arts degree in speech communication from Idaho State University.

== Career ==
Bernt worked as a territory manager for Shaw Industries before founding a flooring business.

== Elections ==
Bernt served as president of the City of Meridian Parks & Recreation Commission.

=== Meridian City Council ===
Bernt defeated Dom Gelsomino, Jordan Moorhouse, and Rick Valenzuela with 57.6% of the vote in 2017.

Bernt defeated Adam Nelson with 51% of the vote compared to 49% in 2021.

=== Idaho Senate District 21 ===
Bernt defeated Thad Butterworth in the Republican Primary with 61.27% compared to 38.73% in 2022.

Bernt defeated Monica McKinley of the Constitution Party in the General Election with 83.13% compared to 16.87% in 2022.

Bernt defeated Brenda Bourn in the Republican Primary with 59.31% compared to 40.69% in 2024.

Bernt defeated Mike Long of the LIbertarian Party in the General Election with 74.3% compared to 25.7% in 2024.
