= Christy Zito =

American politician from Idaho

Christine Zito
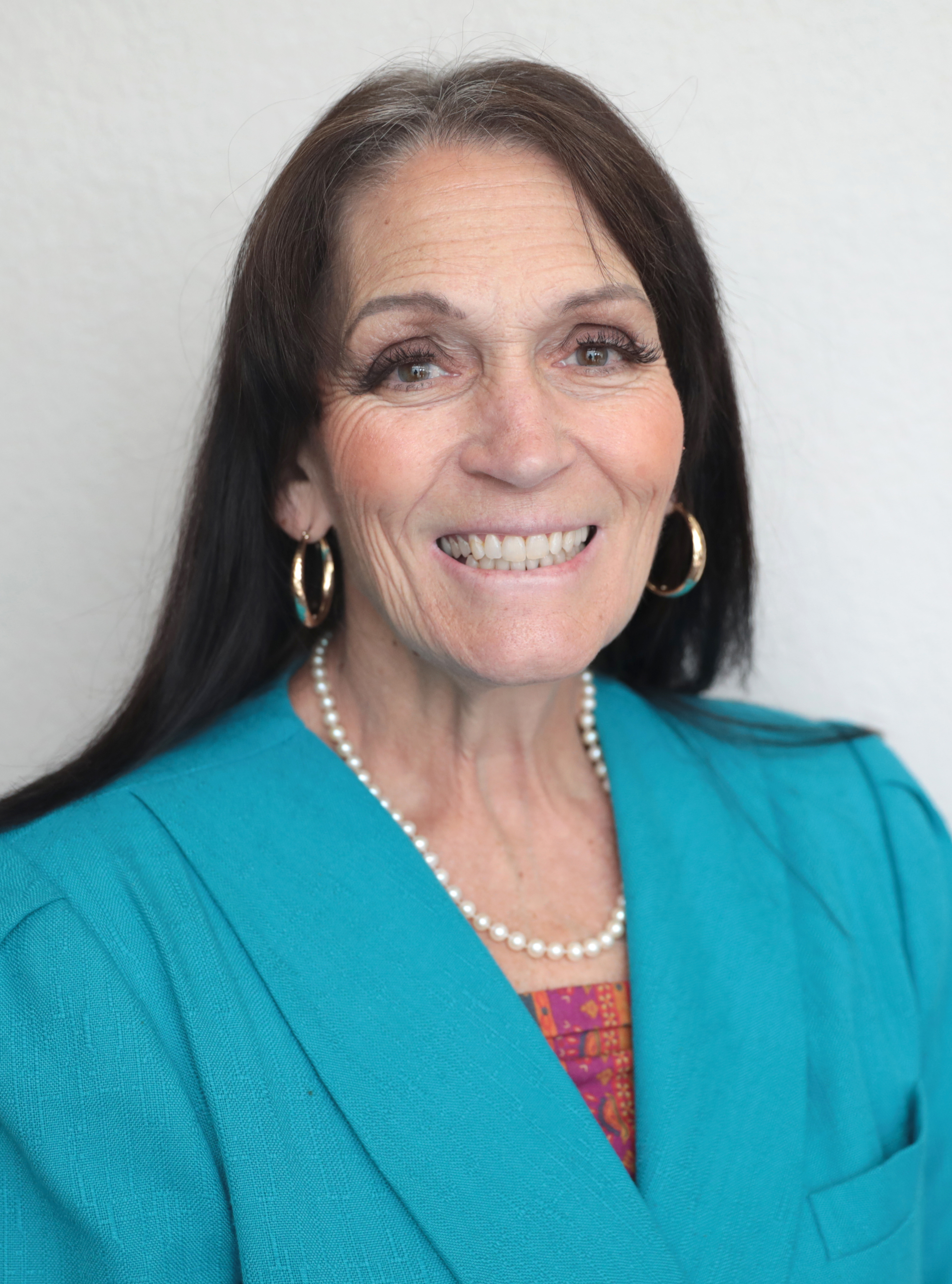

Member of the Idaho Senate from the 8th district
- Incumbent
- Assumed office December 1, 2024
- Preceded by: Geoff Schroeder

Member of the Idaho Senate from the 23rd district
- In office December 1, 2020 – November 30, 2022
- Preceded by: Bert Brackett
- Succeeded by: Todd Lakey (redistricting)

Member of the Idaho House of Representatives from the 23rd district
- In office December 1, 2016 – November 30, 2020
- Preceded by: Rich Wills
- Succeeded by: Matthew Bundy

Personal details
- Born: Utah, U.S.
- Party: Republican
- Children: 5
- Education: Bridgerland Technical College (AS)

Christy Zito is an American politician serving as a Republican member of the Idaho Senate from the 8th district, and formerly serving as a member from the 23rd district. She was previously a member of the Idaho House of Representatives from 2016 to 2020.

== Early life and education ==
Zito was born and raised in Utah. She received an Associate of Science degree in farm and ranch management from Bridgerland Technical College.

== Career ==
Zito was first elected to the Idaho House of Representatives in 2016. After having served for two terms, she filed for election to succeed Bert Brackett in the Idaho Senate. She is a self-described gun-rights activist and has sponsored several bills concerning the Second Amendment to the United States Constitution.

In 2019, Zito also sponsored House Bill 206 which allowed Idaho residents, ages 18–20, to concealed carry without a permit. The bill passed both chambers with supermajority support was signed by Idaho Governor Brad Little on April 2, 2019.

In 2022 Zito chose to not run for re-election and help run the Idaho Second Amendment Alliance, a Doer Brother affiliate website.
