= Michelle Stennett =

American politician

Minority Leader of the Idaho Senate
- In office December 1, 2012 – December 1, 2022
- Preceded by: Edgar Malepeai
- Succeeded by: Melissa Wintrow

Idaho State Senator
- In office October 26, 2010 – November 30, 2022
- Preceded by: Clint Stennett
- Succeeded by: Ron Taylor
- Constituency: 25th district (2010–2012); 26th district (2012–2022)

Personal details
- Born: November 2, 1960 (age 65) Sacramento, California, U.S.
- Party: Democratic
- Spouse: Clint Stennett (died 2010)
- Education: University of Oregon (BA)
- Website: Official website

Michelle Stennett (born November 2, 1960) is a former Democratic Idaho State Senator for District 26 (Ketchum) from 2010 to 2022. She was elected to the Idaho Senate in 2010, succeeding her late husband Clint Stennett. Stennett currently serves as senate minority leader. Stennett announced on February 7, 2022 that she would not seek re-election.

== Early life and education ==
Stennett was born in Sacramento, California, and earned her degrees in Latin languages and international studies from the University of Oregon.

== Senate appointment and career ==
Stennett served as the acting state senator for the 25th District in 2010 due to her husband's declining health; he died in October 2010. The following month she was elected to the seat with 7,113 votes (57.9%) against Republican Jim Donoval and Constitution Party candidate Randall K. Patterson. Redistricted to new Senate District 26, Stennett ran unopposed in the May 15, 2012 Democratic primary with 806 votes with no opposition for the November 6, 2012 general election.

== Committees ==
Stennett currently serves on the following committees:

- Resources & Environment
- State Affairs

She also previously served on the following committees:

- Finance Appropriations
- Finance
- Health & Welfare

Idaho Senate
| Preceded by Edgar J. Malepeai | Minority Leader of the Idaho Senate; 2012–2022 | Succeeded by Melissa Wintrow |
