= David Nelson (Idaho politician) =

American politician

David Nelson is a Democratic Idaho State Senator since 2019, representing District 5. Nelson, an engineer, defeated Senator Dan Foreman in the 2018 general election.

Nelson won reelection in 2020, defeating Foreman in the general election.

== Committee assignments ==
Nelson served on the Health & Welfare, Agricultural Affairs, and Transportation committees during the 2019–2020 legislative session. In the 2021 session, Nelson served on the Agricultural Affairs, Transportation, and Education committees.
