= 2026 Idaho Senate election =

2026 Idaho State Senate election
- November 3, 2026

All 35 seats in the Idaho Senate 18 seats needed for a majority

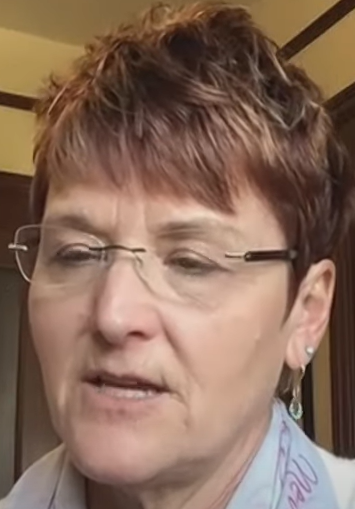
	Majority party	Minority party
Leader	Lori Den Hartog	Melissa Wintrow
Party	Republican	Democratic
Leader's seat	22nd	19th
Seats before	29	6
Seats after	28	7
Seat change	▼1	▲1
- Legend: Democratic incumbent Republican incumbent
Majority Leader before election
Lori Den Hartog
Republican
Elected Majority Leader
Lori Den Hartog
Republican

The 2026 Idaho Senate election was held on November 3, 2026, alongside the Idaho House of Representatives election and the other 2026 United States elections. Voters elected members of the Idaho State Senate in all 35 of the U.S. state of Idaho's legislative districts to serve a two-year term.

== Retirements ==
=== Democrats ===
1. District 16: Alison Rabe is retiring.

=== Republicans ===
1. District 15: Codi Galloway withdrew her candidacy after initially filing for reelection.

== Incumbents defeated ==
=== In primary elections ===
==== Republicans ====
1. District 1: Jim Woodward lost renomination to Scott Herndon.
2. District 24: Glenneda Zuiderveld lost renomination to Bret Reinke.
3. District 25: Josh Kohl lost renomination to Casey Swensen.

== Predictions ==
Source	Ranking	As of
Sabato's Crystal Ball	Safe R	January 22, 2026
State Navigate	Safe R	October 20, 2026

== Results summary ==
Summary of the November 8, 2026 Idaho Senate election results
Party	Candidates	Votes		Seats				
Party	Candidates	No.	%	Before	Up	Won	After	+/–
Republican	34		%	29	29	28	28	▼1
Democratic	33		%	6	6	7	7	▲1
Independent	3		%	0	0	0	0	Steady
Constitution	2		%	0	0	0	0	Steady
Total			100.00%	35	35	35	35	Steady
Source: [ Idaho Elections Results]

== Summary of results by district ==
Bold indicates a district that flipped parties.

District	Incumbent	Party	Elected Senator	Outcome
1st	Jim Woodward	Rep	Scott Herndon	Rep
2nd	Phil Hart	Rep	Phil Hart	Rep
3rd	Doug Okuniewicz	Rep	Doug Okuniewicz	Rep
4th	Ben Toews	Rep	Ben Toews	Rep
5th	Carl Bjerke	Rep	Carl Bjerke	Rep
6th	Dan Foreman	Rep	Dan Foreman	Rep
7th	Cindy Carlson	Rep	Cindy Carlson	Rep
8th	Christy Zito	Rep	Christy Zito	Rep
9th	Brandon Shippy	Rep	Brandon Shippy	Rep
10th	Tammy Nichols	Rep	Tammy Nichols	Rep
11th	Camille Blaylock	Rep	Camille Blaylock	Rep
12th	Ben Adams	Rep	Ben Adams	Rep
13th	Brian Lenney	Rep	Brian Lenney	Rep
14th	C. Scott Grow	Rep	C. Scott Grow	Rep
15th	Codi Galloway	Rep	**Nancy Gregory**	**Dem**
16th	Alison Rabe	Dem	Soñia Galaviz	Dem
17th	Carrie Semmelroth	Dem	Carrie Semmelroth	Dem
18th	Janie Ward-Engelking	Dem	Janie Ward-Engelking	Dem
19th	Melissa Wintrow	Dem	Melissa Wintrow	Dem
20th	Josh Keyser	Rep	Josh Keyser	Rep
21st	Treg Bernt	Rep	Treg Bernt	Rep
22nd	Lori Den Hartog	Rep	Lori Den Hartog	Rep
23rd	Todd Lakey	Rep	Todd Lakey	Rep
24th	Glenneda Zuiderveld	Rep	Brent Reinke	Rep
25th	Josh Kohl	Rep	Casey Swensen	Rep
26th	Ron Taylor	Dem	Ron Taylor	Dem
27th	Kelly Anthon	Rep	Kelly Anthon	Rep
28th	Jim Guthrie	Rep	Jim Guthrie	Rep
29th	James Ruchti	Dem	James Ruchti	Dem
30th	Julie VanOrden	Rep	Julie VanOrden	Rep
31st	Van Burtenshaw	Rep	Van Burtenshaw	Rep
32nd	Kevin Cook	Rep	Kevin Cook	Rep
33rd	Dave Lent	Rep	Dave Lent	Rep
34th	Doug Ricks	Rep	Doug Ricks	Rep
35th	Mark Harris	Rep	Mark Harris	Rep
