= Idaho Republican Party =

Idaho affiliate of the Republican Party

- Chairperson: Dorothy Moon
- Senate leader: Kelly Anthon
- House leader: Mike Moyle
- Founded: 1860s
- Headquarters: 101 South Capitol Blvd. Suite 302, Boise, Idaho 83702
- Membership (2025): ▲627,548
- Ideology: Conservatism
- National affiliation: Republican Party
- Colors: Red
- Seats in the United States Senate: 2 / 2
- Seats in the United States House of Representatives: 2 / 2
- Statewide officers: 7 / 7
- Seats in the Idaho Senate: 29 / 35
- Seats in the Idaho House of Representatives: 61 / 70

Election symbol

Website
- idgop.org

The Idaho Republican Party (IDGOP) is the Idaho state affiliate of the United States Republican Party, headquartered in Boise, Idaho. It is currently the dominant party in the state and is one of the strongest affiliates of the national Republican Party. It controls both of Idaho's U.S. House seats, both U.S. Senate seats, all seven statewide elected offices, and has supermajorities in both houses of the state legislature.

== History ==
By the time of the 1889 Constitutional Convention, the Republican Party had become a prominent Party in Idaho, and made up the majority of the representatives at the Constitutional Convention for statehood. Republicans and Democrats had equal influence in Idaho until the 1960s when the Republican Party emerged as the dominant political Party. The Republican Party has held the governorship since 1995, both US Senate seats since 1981, and both US House seats since 2010.

As of 2022, Idaho has the second largest percentage of Republicans in a state legislature. Republicans control all constitutional offices in the state and maintain supermajorities in the House and Senate.

The party had been reported to have a growing faction of far-right political activists, with a concentration in Kootenai County. In 2021, the Koontenai County Republican Central Committee endorsed Dave Reilly, a political activist from Pennsylvania who attended the 2017 Unite the Right rally and has gained notoriety for antisemitic public statements, for candidacy in a Post Falls school board election. The KCRCC has also made public statements in support of Austrian neo-nazi activist Martin Sellner and the anti-communist John Birch Society. Outside of Koonetai County, within the Idaho Legislature, Rep. Chad Christensen identifies himself as being a member of both the far-right militia Oath Keepers and the John Birch Society.

== Governing body ==
- State Central Committee: The governing body of the Idaho Republican Party is the Republican State Central Committee, which is made up of elected members from each legislative district and county. It establishes the rules and functions of the Idaho Republican Party on the state level.
- Chairman and executive committee: The current chairman of the Idaho Republican Party is Dorothy Moon. Moon was elected in July 2022, defeating incumbent Tom Luna. She is considered a far-right conservative.

The executive committee consists of a first and second vice chair, secretary, treasurer, finance chair, region chairs from each of Idaho's ten regions, and the presidents of the affiliated clubs; Young Republicans, College Republicans, and Republican Women. Members of the executive committee who are not Region Chairs are elected at the State Convention, held bi-annually.

Executive Committee Members
Voting Members
| Chairman | Dorothy Moon |
| 1st Vice Chair | Viki Purdy |
| 2nd Vice Chair | Julianne Young |
| National Committeeman | Bryan Smith |
| National Committeewoman | Vicki Keen |
| Secretary | Carla Mattare |
| Treasurer | Sandra Eaton |
| Region 1 | Scott Herndon |
| Region 2 | Bjorn Handeen |
| Region 3 | Nick Woods |
| Region 4 | Machele Hamilton |
| Region 5 | Mark Johnson |
| Region 6 | Jean Mollenkopf-Moore |
| Region 7 | Mike Mathews |
| Region 8 | Trent Clark |
| Region 9 | Steve Pinther |
| Region 10 | Andrew Mickelsen |
Ex-Officio Members
| Finance Chair | TBD |
| Young Republicans Chair | Tyler Kelly |
| IFRW President | Tracey Wasden |
| College Republicans Chair | Farhana Hibbert |

=== Meetings ===
Meetings of both the State Central Committee and the State Executive Committee are usually held every six months, including those held in proximity to State Conventions.

The party convened in July 2022 to consider a resolution declaring that Joe Biden had not been legitimately elected president of the United States.

=== Regions ===
Regions of the IDGOP are groups of Idaho Counties defined by Article III, Section 1 of the State Rules.

| Region | Counties |
|---|---|
| Region 1 | Bonner, Boundary, Shoshone |
| Region 2 | Benewah, Kootenai |
| Region 3 | Adams, Clearwater, Idaho, Latah, Lewis, Nez Perce |
| Region 4 | Canyon, Owyhee, Payette, Washington |
| Region 5 | Ada |
| Region 6 | Boise, Custer, Elmore, Gem, Valley |
| Region 7 | Blaine, Camas, Cassia, Gooding, Jerome, Lincoln, Minidoka, Twin Falls |
| Region 8 | Bannock, Bear Lake, Caribou, Franklin, Oneida, Power |
| Region 9 | Butte, Clark, Fremont, Lemhi, Madison, Teton |
| Region 10 | Bingham, Bonneville, Jefferson |

== Current Republican officeholders ==
=== Members of Congress ===
==== U.S. Senate ====
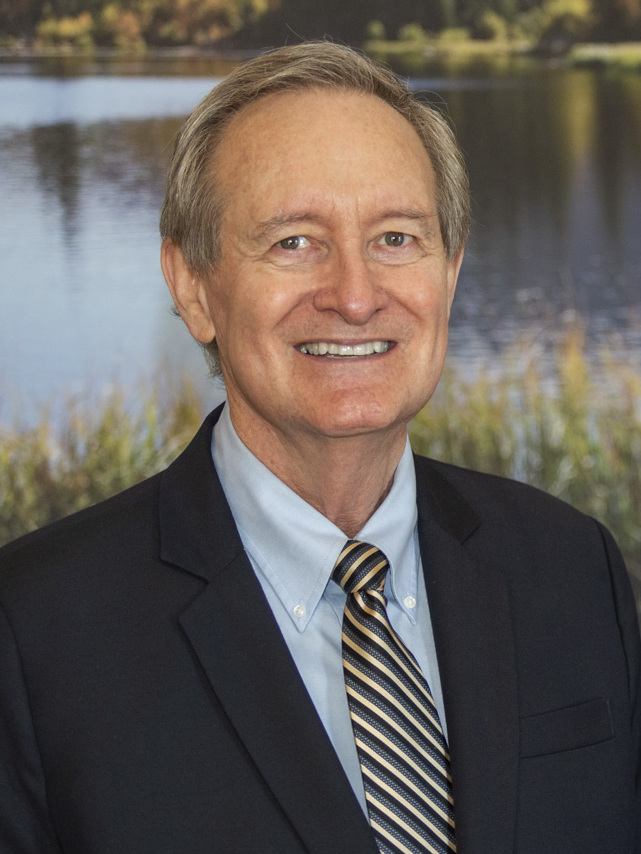
Senior U.S. Senator Mike Crapo

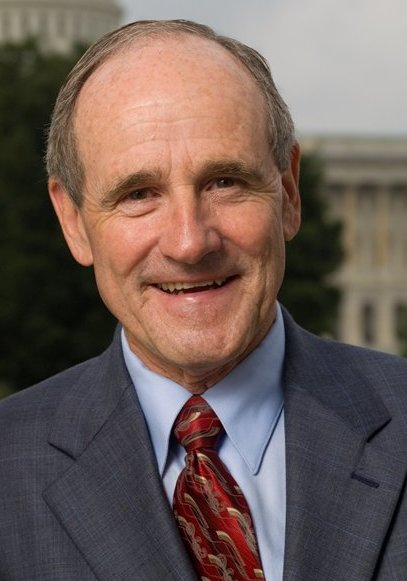
Junior U.S. Senator Jim Risch

==== U.S. House of Representatives ====
| District | Member | Photo |
|---|---|---|
| 1st | Russ Fulcher | |
| 2nd | Mike Simpson | |

=== Constitutional Offices ===
| Office | Official | Photo |
|---|---|---|
| Governor | Brad Little | |
| Lieutenant Governor | Scott Bedke | |
| Secretary of State | Phil McGrane | |
| Attorney General | Raúl Labrador | |
| State Treasurer | Julie Ellsworth | |
| State Controller | Brandon Woolf | |
| Superintendent of Public Instruction | Debbie Critchfield | |

=== State legislators ===
==== Idaho Senate ====
Republicans currently hold 29 out of 35 seats in the Idaho Senate, since the 2025 Session.

| Legislative District | Senator | County |
|---|---|---|
| LD-1 | Jim Woodward | Boundary/Bonner |
| LD-2 | Phil Hart | Benewah/Clearwater/Kootenai/Shoshone/Bonner |
| LD-3 | Doug Okuniewicz | Kootenai |
| LD-4 | Ben Toews | Kootenai |
| LD-5 | Carl Bjerke | Kootenai |
| LD-6 | Dan Foreman | Latah/Lewis/Nez Perce |
| LD-7 | Cindy Carlson | Adams/Idaho/Nez Perce |
| LD-8 | Christy Zito | Valley/Gem/Boise/Custer/Elmore |
| LD-9 | Brandon Shippy | Washington/Payette/Canyon |
| LD-10 | Tammy Nichols | Canyon/Ada |
| LD-11 | Camille Blaylock | Canyon |
| LD-12 | Ben Adams | Canyon |
| LD-13 | Brian Lenney | Canyon |
| LD-14 | C. Scott Grow | Ada/Gem |
| LD-20 | Josh Keyser | Ada |
| LD-21 | Treg Bernt | Ada |
| LD-22 | Lori Den Hartog | Ada |
| LD-23 | Todd Lakey | Owyhee/Canyon/Ada |
| LD-24 | Glenneda Zuiderveld | Twin Falls/Camas/Gooding |
| LD-25 | Josh Kohl | Twin Falls |
| LD-27 | Kelly Anthon | Minidoka/Cassia/Oneida |
| LD-28 | Jim Guthrie | Power/Bannock/Franklin |
| LD-30 | Julie VanOrden | Bingham/Butte |
| LD-31 | Van Burtenshaw | Clark/Fremont/Jefferson/Lemhi |
| LD-32 | Kevin Cook | Bonneville |
| LD-33 | Dave Lent | Bonneville |
| LD-34 | Doug Ricks | Madison |
| LD-35 | Mark Harris | Bannock/Bear Lake/Bonneville/Caribou/Teton |

==== Idaho House of Representatives ====
Republicans currently hold 61 out of 70 seats in the Idaho House of Representatives, since the 2025 session.

| Legislative District | Representative | County |
|---|---|---|
| LD-1A | Mark Sauter | Boundary/Bonner |
| LD-1B | Cornel Rasor | Boundary/Bonner |
| LD-2A | Heather Scott | Benewah/Clearwater/Kootenai/Shoshone |
| LD-2B | Dale Hawkins | Benewah/Clearwater/Kootenai/Shoshone |
| LD-3A | Vito Barbieri | Kootenai |
| LD-3B | Jordan Redman | Kootenai |
| LD-4A | Joe Alfieri | Kootenai |
| LD-4B | Elaine Price | Kootenai |
| LD-5A | Ron Mendive | Kootenai |
| LD-5B | Tony Wisniewski | Kootenai |
| LD-6A | Lori McCann | Latah/Lewis/Nez Perce |
| LD-6B | Brandon Mitchell | Latah/Lewis/Nez Perce |
| LD-7A | Kyle Harris | Adams/Idaho/Nez Perce |
| LD-7B | Charlie Shepherd | Adams/Idaho/Nez Perce |
| LD-8A | Rob Beiswenger | Boise/Valley/Elemore/Custer |
| LD-8B | Faye Thompson | Boise/Valley/Elemore/Custer |
| LD-9A | John Shirts | Payette/Washington/Canyon |
| LD-9B | Judy Boyle | Payette/Washington/Canyon |
| LD-10A | Mike Moyle | Ada/Canyon |
| LD-10B | Bruce Skaug | Ada/Canyon |
| LD-11A | Kent Marmon | Canyon |
| LD-11B | Lucas Cayler | Canyon |
| LD-12A | Jeff Cornilles | Canyon |
| LD-12B | Jaron Crane | Canyon |
| LD-13A | Brent Crane | Canyon |
| LD-13B | Steve Tanner | Canyon |
| LD-14A | Ted Hill | Gem/Ada |
| LD-14B | Josh Tanner | Gem/Ada |
| LD-15B | Dori Healey | Ada |
| LD-20A | Joe Palmer | Ada |
| LD-20B | James Holtzclaw | Ada |
| LD-21A | James Petzke | Ada |
| LD-21B | Jeff Ehlers | Ada |
| LD-22A | John Vander Woude | Ada |
| LD-22B | Jason Monks | Ada |
| LD-23A | Chris Bruce | Owyhee/Canyon/Ada |
| LD-23B | Shawn Dygert | Owyhee/Canyon/Ada |
| LD-24A | Clint Hostetler | Camas/Gooding/Twin Falls |
| LD-24B | Steve Miller | Camas/Gooding/Twin Falls |
| LD-25A | Lance Clow | Twin Falls |
| LD-25B | David Leavitt | Twin Falls |
| LD-26A | Mike Pohanka | Blaine/Lincoln/Jerome |
| LD-26B | Jack Nelsen | Blaine/Lincoln/Jerome |
| LD-27A | Douglas Pickett | Cassia/Minidoka/Oneida |
| LD-27B | Clay Handy | Cassia/Minidoka/Oneida |
| LD-28A | Rick Cheatum | Bannock/Franklin/Power |
| LD-28B | Dan Garner | Bannock/Franklin/Power |
| LD-29A | Dustin Manwaring | Bannock |
| LD-29B | Tanya Burgoyne | Bannock |
| LD-30A | David Cannon | Bingham/Butte |
| LD-30B | Ben Fuhriman | Bingham/Butte |
| LD-31A | Jerald Raymond | Clark/Fremont/Jefferson/Lemhi |
| LD-31B | Rod Furniss | Clark/Fremont/Jefferson/Lemhi |
| LD-32A | Stephanie Mickelsen | Bonneville |
| LD-32B | Wendy Horman | Bonneville |
| LD-33A | Barbara Ehardt | Bonneville |
| LD-33B | Marco Erickson | Bonneville |
| LD-34A | Jon Weber | Madison |
| LD-34B | Britt Raybould | Madison |
| LD-35A | Kevin Andrus | Bannock/Bear Lake/Bonneville/Caribou/Teton |
| LD-35B | Josh Wheeler | Bannock/Bear Lake/Bonneville/Caribou/Teton |

=== Senate ===
- President Pro Tem of the Senate: Kelly Anthon
- Majority Leader of the Senate:Lori Den Hartog
- Assistant Majority Leader of the Senate: Mark Harris
- Majority Caucus Chair of the Senate: Ben Toews

=== House ===
- Speaker of the House: Mike Moyle
- Majority Leader of the House: Jason Monks
- Assistant Majority Leader of the House: Josh Tanner
- Majority Caucus Chair of the House: Jaron Crane

== Chairs of IDGOP ==
| Chairman | Term |
|---|---|
| Dorothy Moon | July 2022 |
| Tom Luna | June 2020 – July 2022 |
| Raúl Labrador | June 2019 – June 2020 |
| Jennifer Locke (acting) | February 2019 – June 2019 |
| Jonathan Parker | June 2017 – February 2019 |
| Stephen Yates | August 2014 – June 2017 |
| Vacant | June 2014 – August 2014 |
| Barry Peterson | June 2012 – June 2014 |
| Norm Semanko | June 2008 – June 2012 |
| J. Kirk Sullivan | June 2004 – June 2008 |
| John Sandy | 2002 – June 2004 |
| Trent Clark | 1999–2002 |
| Ron McMurray | 1996–1999 |
| N. Randy Smith | 1993–1996 |
| Phil Batt | 1991–1993 |
| Randy Ayre | 1989–1991 |
| Blake Hall | 1985–1989 |
| Dennis Olsen | 1977–1985 |
| Vern Ravenscroft | 1975–1977 |
| Robert "Bob" Linville | 1974–1975 |
| Marge Miner | 1972–1974 |
| Roland Wilber | 1968–1972 |
| John O. McMurray | June 1961 – 1968 |
| Ray Robbins | 1958 – June 1961 |
| Wallace C. Burns | 1955–1958 |
| William S. Campbell | 1952–1955 |
| Milton L. Horsley | 1950–1952 |
| Ezra B. Hinshaw | 1948–1950 |
| T.W. "Tom" Smith | 1946–1948 |
| S.L. "Vern" Thorpe | 1944–1946 |
| Reilly Atkinson Sr | 1942–1944 |
| Thomas "Tom" Heath | 1938–1942 |
| C. A. Bottolfsen | 1936–1938 |
| R.P. Perry | 1931–1936 |
| R. B. Scatterday | 1930–1931 |
| John McMurray | 1924–1930 |
| I. H. Nash | 1922–1924 |
| John Thomas | 1918–1922 |
| S.D. Taylor | 1918–1918 |
| Evan Evans | July 1915-1918 |
| George A. Day | September 1912- July 1915 |
| C.L. Heitman | September 1910- September 1912 |
| B.F. O'Neil | September 1908- September 1910 |
| James H. Brady | August 1904– September 1908 |
| Frank R. Gooding | 1900 – August 1904 |
| George H. Stewart | August 1896 |
| J.H. Richards | August 1894–? |
| Edgar Wilson | May 1892- August 1894 |
| William Borah | February 1892 – May 1892 |
| Joe Pinkham | August 1890-February 1892 |
| James H. Beatty | September 1888-? |
| I.W. Garrett | ?- September 1888 |

== Election results ==
=== Presidential ===
Idaho Republican Party presidential election results
| Election | Presidential ticket | Votes | Vote % | Electoral votes | Result |
|---|---|---|---|---|---|
| 1892 | Benjamin Harrison/Whitelaw Reid | 8,599 | 44.31% | 0 / 3 | Lost |
| 1896 | William McKinley/Garret Hobart | 6,314 | 21.32% | 0 / 3 | Won |
| 1900 | William McKinley/Theodore Roosevelt | 27,198 | 46.96% | 0 / 3 | Won |
| 1904 | Theodore Roosevelt/Charles W. Fairbanks | 47,783 | 65.84% | 3 / 3 | Won |
| 1908 | William Howard Taft/James S. Sherman | 52,621 | 54.09% | 3 / 3 | Won |
| 1912 | William Howard Taft/Nicholas M. Butler | 32,810 | 31.02% | 0 / 4 | Lost |
| 1916 | Charles E. Hughes/Charles W. Fairbanks | 55,368 | 41.13% | 0 / 4 | Lost |
| 1920 | Warren G. Harding/Calvin Coolidge | 88,975 | 65.60% | 4 / 4 | Won |
| 1924 | Calvin Coolidge/Charles G. Dawes | 69,879 | 47.12% | 4 / 4 | Won |
| 1928 | Herbert Hoover/Charles Curtis | 97,322 | 64.22% | 4 / 4 | Won |
| 1932 | Herbert Hoover/Charles Curtis | 71,417 | 38.27% | 0 / 4 | Lost |
| 1936 | Alf Landon/Frank Knox | 66,256 | 33.19% | 0 / 4 | Lost |
| 1940 | Wendell Willkie/Charles L. McNary | 106,553 | 45.31% | 0 / 4 | Lost |
| 1944 | Thomas E. Dewey/John W. Bricker | 100,137 | 48.07% | 0 / 4 | Lost |
| 1948 | Thomas E. Dewey/Earl Warren | 101,514 | 47.26% | 0 / 4 | Lost |
| 1952 | Dwight D. Eisenhower/Richard Nixon | 180,707 | 65.42% | 4 / 4 | Won |
| 1956 | Dwight D. Eisenhower/Richard Nixon | 166,979 | 61.17% | 4 / 4 | Won |
| 1960 | Richard Nixon/Henry Cabot Lodge Jr. | 161,597 | 53.78% | 4 / 4 | Lost |
| 1964 | Barry Goldwater/William E. Miller | 143,557 | 49.08% | 0 / 4 | Lost |
| 1968 | Richard Nixon/Spiro Agnew | 165,369 | 56.79% | 4 / 4 | Won |
| 1972 | Richard Nixon/Spiro Agnew | 199,384 | 64.24% | 4 / 4 | Won |
| 1976 | Gerald Ford/Bob Dole | 204,151 | 59.88% | 4 / 4 | Lost |
| 1980 | Ronald Reagan/George H. W. Bush | 290,699 | 66.46% | 4 / 4 | Won |
| 1984 | Ronald Reagan/George H. W. Bush | 297,523 | 72.36% | 4 / 4 | Won |
| 1988 | George H. W. Bush/Dan Quayle | 253,881 | 62.08% | 4 / 4 | Won |
| 1992 | George H. W. Bush/Dan Quayle | 202,645 | 42.03% | 4 / 4 | Lost |
| 1996 | Bob Dole/Jack Kemp | 256,595 | 52.18% | 4 / 4 | Lost |
| 2000 | George W. Bush/Dick Cheney | 336,937 | 67.17% | 4 / 4 | Won |
| 2004 | George W. Bush/Dick Cheney | 409,235 | 68.38% | 4 / 4 | Won |
| 2008 | John McCain/Sarah Palin | 403,012 | 61.21% | 4 / 4 | Lost |
| 2012 | Mitt Romney/Paul Ryan | 420,911 | 64.09% | 4 / 4 | Lost |
| 2016 | Donald Trump/Mike Pence | 409,055 | 59.25% | 4 / 4 | Won |
| 2020 | Donald Trump/Mike Pence | 554,119 | 63.84% | 4 / 4 | Lost |
| 2024 | Donald Trump/JD Vance | 605,246 | 66.87% | 4 / 4 | Won |

=== Gubernatorial ===
Idaho Republican Party gubernatorial election results
| Election | Gubernatorial candidate | Votes | Vote % | Result |
|---|---|---|---|---|
| 1890 | | | | |
| 1892 | William J. McConnell | 8,178 | 40.74% | Won ✓ |
| 1894 | William J. McConnell | 10,208 | 41.51% | Won ✓ |
| 1896 | David H. Budlong | 6,441 | 22.38% | Lost ✗ |
| 1898 | Albert B. Moss | 13,794 | 34.71% | Lost ✗ |
| 1900 | D. W. Standrod | 26,468 | 47.04% | Lost ✗ |
| 1902 | John T. Morrison | 31,874 | 52.90% | Won ✓ |
| 1904 | Frank R. Gooding | 41,877 | 58.74% | Won ✓ |
| 1906 | Frank R. Gooding | 38,386 | 52.18% | Won ✓ |
| 1908 | James H. Brady | 47,864 | 49.61% | Won ✓ |
| 1910 | James H. Brady | 39,961 | 46.38% | Lost ✗ |
| 1912 | John M. Haines | 35,074 | 33.24% | Won ✓ |
| 1914 | John M. Haines | 40,349 | 37.39% | Lost ✗ |
| 1916 | D. W. Davis | 63,305 | 47.07% | Lost ✗ |
| 1918 | D. W. Davis | 57,626 | 59.95% | Won ✓ |
| 1920 | D. W. Davis | 75,748 | 52.97% | Won ✓ |
| 1922 | Charles C. Moore | 50,538 | 39.53% | Won ✓ |
| 1924 | Charles C. Moore | 65,508 | 43.94% | Won ✓ |
| 1926 | H. C. Baldridge | 61,575 | 51.05% | Won ✓ |
| 1928 | H. C. Baldridge | 87,681 | 57.82% | Won ✓ |
| 1930 | John McMurray | 58,002 | 43.98% | Lost ✗ |
| 1932 | Byron Defenbach | 68,863 | 36.44% | Lost ✗ |
| 1934 | Frank L. Stephan | 75,659 | 44.26% | Lost ✗ |
| 1936 | Frank L. Stephan | 83,430 | 41.46% | Lost ✗ |
| 1938 | C. A. Bottolfsen | 106,268 | 57.30% | Won ✓ |
| 1940 | C. A. Bottolfsen | 118,117 | 49.52% | Lost ✗ |
| 1942 | C. A. Bottolfsen | 72,260 | 50.15% | Won ✓ |
| 1944 | W. H. Detweiler | 98,532 | 47.36% | Lost ✗ |
| 1946 | C. A. Robins | 102,233 | 56.37% | Won ✓ |
| 1950 | Len Jordan | 107,642 | 52.56% | Won ✓ |
| 1954 | Robert E. Smylie | 124,038 | 54.24% | Won ✓ |
| 1958 | Robert E. Smylie | 121,810 | 50.96% | Won ✓ |
| 1962 | Robert E. Smylie | 139,578 | 54.64% | Won ✓ |
| 1966 | Don Samuelson | 104,586 | 41.41% | Won ✓ |
| 1970 | Don Samuelson | 117,108 | 47.78% | Lost ✗ |
| 1974 | Jack Murphy | 68,731 | 26.47% | Lost ✗ |
| 1978 | Allan Larsen | 114,149 | 39.56% | Lost ✗ |
| 1982 | Phil Batt | 161,157 | 49.36% | Lost ✗ |
| 1986 | David H. Leroy | 189,794 | 49.0% | Lost ✗ |
| 1990 | Roger Fairchild | 101,937 | 31.79% | Lost ✗ |
| 1994 | Phil Batt | 216,123 | 52.29% | Won ✓ |
| 1998 | Dirk Kempthorne | 258,095 | 67.70% | Won ✓ |
| 2002 | Dirk Kempthorne | 231,566 | 56.28% | Won ✓ |
| 2006 | Butch Otter | 237,437 | 52.67% | Won ✓ |
| 2010 | Butch Otter | 267,483 | 59.11% | Won ✓ |
| 2014 | Butch Otter | 235,405 | 53.52% | Won ✓ |
| 2018 | Brad Little | 361,661 | 59.76% | Won ✓ |
| 2022 | Brad Little | 358,598 | 60.51% | Won ✓ |
| 2026 | Brad Little | 407,253 | 57.10% | Won ✓ |
