= 2018 Idaho Senate election =

- November 6, 2018

All 35 seats in the Idaho Senate 18 seats needed for a majority
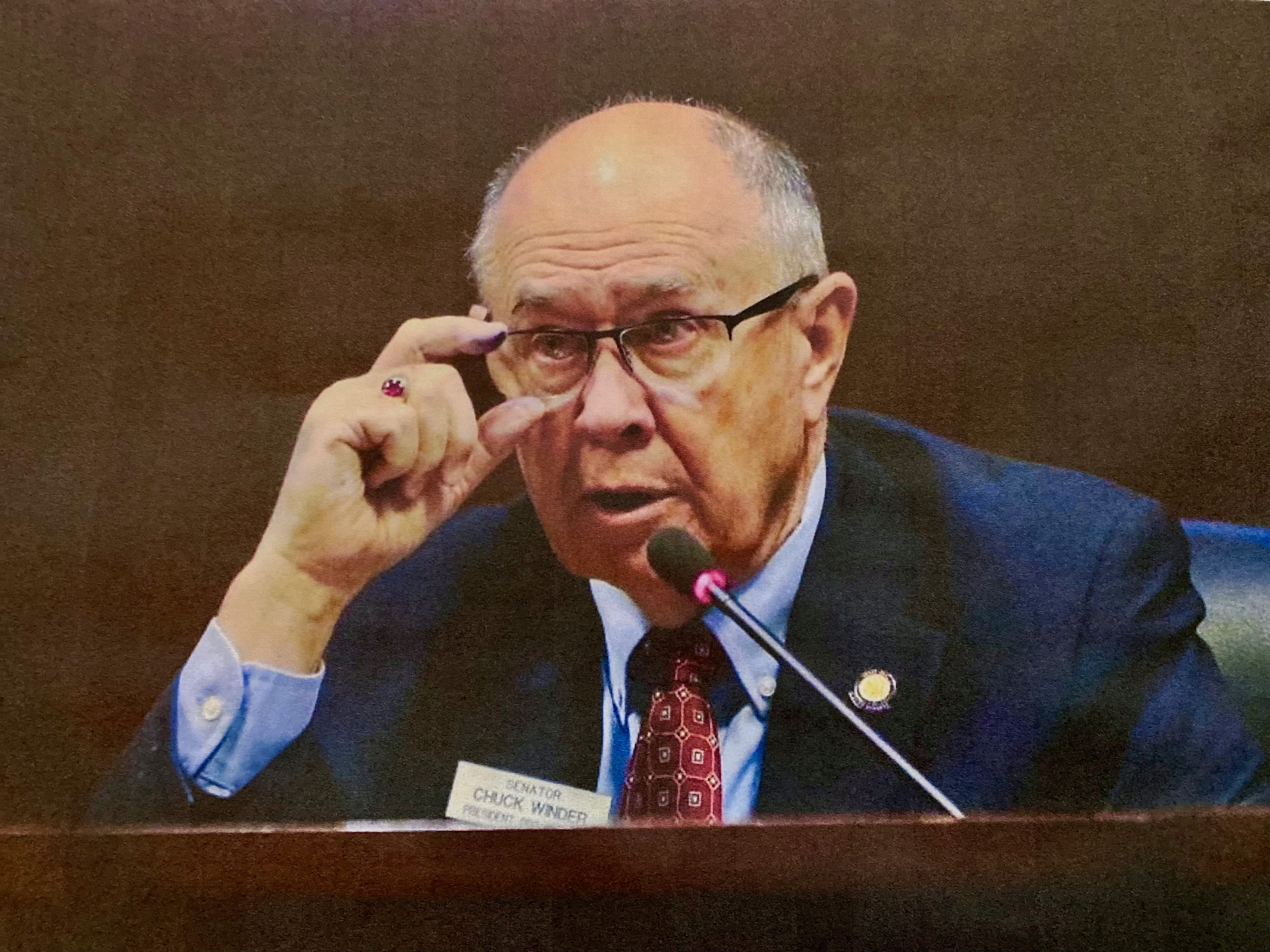

	Majority party	Minority party
Leader	Chuck Winder	Michelle Stennett
Party	Republican	Democratic
Leader since	September 21, 2017	December 1, 2012
Leader's seat	District 20	District 26
Last election	29	6
Seats after	28	7
Seat change	▼1	▲1
Popular vote	377,542	169,426
Percentage	68.10%	30.56%
Majority Leader before election
Chuck Winder
Republican
Elected Majority Leader
Chuck Winder
Republican

The 2018 Idaho Senate election was held on November 6, 2018, to determine which party would control the Idaho Senate for the following two years in the 65th Idaho Legislature. All 35 seats in the Idaho Senate were up for election and the primary was held on May 15, 2018. Prior to the election, 29 seats were held by Republicans and 6 seats were held by Democrats. The general election saw Democrats flip a single seat, thereby meaning that Republicans retained their majority in the State Senate.

== Predictions ==
Source	Ranking	As of
Governing	Safe R	October 8, 2018

== Retirements ==
=== Republicans ===
1. District 1: Shawn Keough retired.
2. District 3: Bob Nonini retired.
3. District 14: Marv Hagedorn retired.
4. District 35: Jeff Siddoway retired.

== Incumbents defeated ==
=== In primary ===
==== Republicans ====
1. District 33: Tony Potts lost renomination to Dave Lent.

=== In general ===
==== Republicans ====
1. District 5: Dan Foreman lost re-election to David Nelson.

== Closest races ==
Seats where the margin of victory was under 10%:

1. District 15, 0.04%

== Results ==
=== District 1 ===
District 1 election, 2018
Party	Candidate	Votes	%
Republican	Jim Woodward	14,831	74.32%
Democratic	Vera Gadman	5,125	25.68%
Total votes		19,956	100.0%
Republican hold			

=== District 2 ===
District 2 election, 2018
Party	Candidate	Votes	%
Republican	Steve Vick (incumbent)	15,109	72.88%
Democratic	Dale Broadsword	5,131	24.75%
Libertarian	Shon Luoma	491	2.37%
Total votes		20,731	100.0%
Republican hold			

=== District 3 ===
District 3 election, 2018
Party	Candidate	Votes	%
Republican	Don Cheatham	12,226	72.20%
Democratic	Patrick Lippert	4,707	27.80%
Total votes		16,933	100.0%
Republican hold			

=== District 4 ===
District 4 election, 2018
Party	Candidate	Votes	%
Republican	Mary Souza (incumbent)	10,579	57.72%
Democratic	Cory Jane English	7,749	42.28%
Total votes		18,328	100.0%
Republican hold			

=== District 5 ===
District 5 election, 2018
Party	Candidate	Votes	%
Democratic	David Nelson	11,197	56.06%
Republican	Dan Foreman (incumbent)	8,777	43.94%
Total votes		19,974	100.0%
Democratic gain from Republican			

=== District 6 ===
District 6 election, 2018
Party	Candidate	Votes	%
Republican	Dan G. Johnson (incumbent)	13,353	100.0%
Total votes		13,353	100.0%
Republican hold			

=== District 7 ===
District 7 election, 2018
Party	Candidate	Votes	%
Republican	Carl Crabtree (incumbent)	13,936	100.0%
Total votes		13,936	100.0%
Republican hold			

=== District 8 ===
District 8 election, 2018
Party	Candidate	Votes	%
Republican	Steven Thayn (incumbent)	14,128	70.98%
Independent	Bill Sifford	4,510	22.66%
Constitution	Kirsten Faith Richardson	1,265	6.36%
Total votes		19,903	100.0%
Republican hold			

=== District 9 ===
District 9 election, 2018
Party	Candidate	Votes	%
Republican	Abby Lee (incumbent)	13,849	100.0%
Total votes		13,849	100.0%
Republican hold			

=== District 10 ===
District 10 election, 2018
Party	Candidate	Votes	%
Republican	Jim Rice (incumbent)	7,526	61.46%
Democratic	Evangeline Beechler	4,720	38.54%
Total votes		12,246	100.0%
Republican hold			

=== District 11 ===
District 11 election, 2018
Party	Candidate	Votes	%
Republican	Patti Anne Lodge (incumbent)	13,834	77.79%
Democratic	Edward Savala	3,949	22.21%
Total votes		17,783	100.0%
Republican hold			

=== District 12 ===
District 12 election, 2018
Party	Candidate	Votes	%
Republican	Todd Lakey (incumbent)	9,089	65.09%
Democratic	Chelle Gluch	4,875	34.91%
Total votes		13,964	100.0%
Republican hold			

=== District 13 ===
District 13 election, 2018
Party	Candidate	Votes	%
Republican	Jeff Agenbroad (incumbent)	12,550	100.0%
Total votes		12,550	100.0%
Republican hold			

=== District 14 ===
District 14 election, 2018
Party	Candidate	Votes	%
Republican	C. Scott Grow	18,893	69.56%
Democratic	Richard Boozel	8,268	30.44%
Total votes		27,161	100.0%
Republican hold			

=== District 15 ===
District 15 election, 2018
Party	Candidate	Votes	%
Republican	Fred S. Martin (incumbent)	8,948	50.02%
Democratic	Jim Bratnober	8,942	49.98%
Total votes		17,890	100.0%
Republican hold			

=== District 16 ===
District 16 election, 2018
Party	Candidate	Votes	%
Democratic	Grant Burgoyne (incumbent)	12,784	65.21%
Republican	LeeJoe Lay	6,819	34.79%
Total votes		19,603	100.0%
Democratic hold			

=== District 17 ===
District 17 election, 2018
Party	Candidate	Votes	%
Democratic	Maryanne Jordan (incumbent)	11,652	69.68%
Republican	David DeHaas	5,069	30.32%
Total votes		16,721	100.0%
Democratic hold			

=== District 18 ===
District 18 election, 2018
Party	Candidate	Votes	%
Democratic	Janie Ward-Engelking (incumbent)	17,090	100.0%
Total votes		17,090	100.0%
Democratic hold			

=== District 19 ===
District 19 election, 2018
Party	Candidate	Votes	%
Democratic	Cherie Buckner-Webb (incumbent)	18,793	74.59%
Republican	Aaron Tribble	6,401	25.41%
Total votes		25,194	100.0%
Democratic hold			

=== District 20 ===
District 20 election, 2018
Party	Candidate	Votes	%
Republican	Chuck Winder (incumbent)	14,535	100.0%
Total votes		14,535	100.0%
Republican hold			

=== District 21 ===
District 21 election, 2018
Party	Candidate	Votes	%
Republican	Clifford Bayer (incumbent)	12,275	57.80%
Democratic	Dawn Pierce	7,776	36.61%
Libertarian	Joe Evans	1,187	5.59%
Total votes		21,238	100.0%
Republican hold			

=== District 22 ===
District 22 election, 2018
Party	Candidate	Votes	%
Republican	Lori Den Hartog (incumbent)	10,709	69.36%
Democratic	Mik Lose	4,731	30.64%
Total votes		15,440	100.0%
Republican hold			

=== District 23 ===
District 23 election, 2018
Party	Candidate	Votes	%
Republican	Bert Brackett (incumbent)	10,492	100.0%
Total votes		10,492	100.0%
Republican hold			

=== District 24 ===
District 24 election, 2018
Party	Candidate	Votes	%
Republican	Lee Heider (incumbent)	10,547	100.0%
Total votes		10,547	100.0%
Republican hold			

=== District 25 ===
District 25 election, 2018
Party	Candidate	Votes	%
Republican	James Patrick (incumbent)	11,969	100.0%
Total votes		11,969	100.0%
Republican hold			

=== District 26 ===
District 26 election, 2018
Party	Candidate	Votes	%
Democratic	Michelle Stennett (incumbent)	10,094	59.86%
Republican	Julie Lynn	6,768	40.14%
Total votes		16,862	100.0%
Democratic hold			

=== District 27 ===
District 27 election, 2018
Party	Candidate	Votes	%
Republican	Kelly Anthon (incumbent)	10,291	100.0%
Total votes		10,291	100.0%
Republican hold			

=== District 28 ===
District 28 election, 2018
Party	Candidate	Votes	%
Republican	Jim Guthrie (incumbent)	10,174	61.88%
Democratic	Mike Saville	6,268	38.12%
Total votes		16,442	100.0%
Republican hold			

=== District 29 ===
District 29 election, 2018
Party	Candidate	Votes	%
Democratic	Mark Nye (incumbent)	8,338	57.85%
Republican	Lance B. Kolbet	6,074	42.15%
Total votes		14,412	100.0%
Democratic hold			

=== District 30 ===
District 30 election, 2018
Party	Candidate	Votes	%
Republican	Dean Mortimer (incumbent)	12,838	100.0%
Total votes		12,838	100.0%
Republican hold			

=== District 31 ===
District 31 election, 2018
Party	Candidate	Votes	%
Republican	Steve Bair (incumbent)	11,084	100.0%
Total votes		11,084	100.0%
Republican hold			

=== District 32 ===
District 32 election, 2018
Party	Candidate	Votes	%
Republican	Mark Harris (incumbent)	13,347	100.0%
Total votes		13,347	100.0%
Republican hold			

=== District 33 ===
District 33 election, 2018
Party	Candidate	Votes	%
Republican	Dave Lent	7,899	59.49%
Democratic	Jerry Sehlke	5,379	40.51%
Total votes		13,278	100.0%
Republican hold			

=== District 34 ===
District 34 election, 2018
Party	Candidate	Votes	%
Republican	Brent Hill (incumbent)	9,500	83.64%
Democratic	Robert Nielsen	1,858	16.36%
Total votes		11,358	100.0%
Republican hold			

=== District 35 ===
District 35 election, 2018
Party	Candidate	Votes	%
Republican	Van Burtenshaw	13,123	100.0%
Total votes		13,123	100.0%
Republican hold			
