= Defend the Guard =

Proposed U.S. state legislation

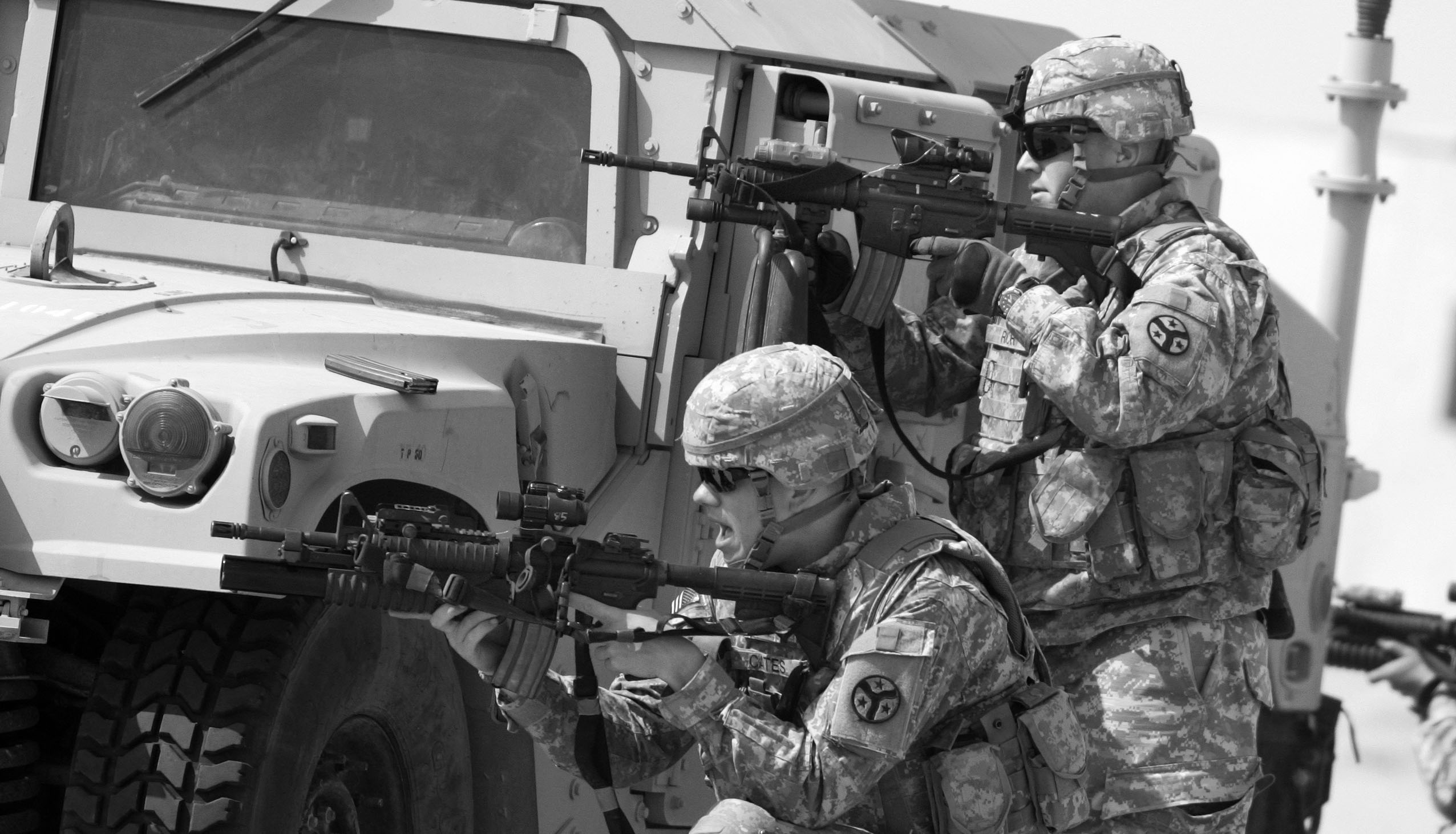
Over the past 20 years, roughly half of the troops deployed to Iraq and Afghanistan, as part of the Global War on Terror, were from the National Guard and reserves.

Defend the Guard is a state-level proposed legislation in multiple U.S. states seeking to prohibit state National Guard members from being deployed into active combat overseas without a formal declaration of war by the United States Congress.

== Overview ==
The Defend the Guard initiative has been introduced in several state legislatures, including Montana, Maine, New Hampshire, Oklahoma, Texas, Idaho, Arizona, West Virginia, Virginia, and Michigan. Supporters of Defend the Guard argue that Article I, Section 8 of the U.S. Constitution gives Congress, rather than the president, the exclusive authority to declare war, and that state National Guardsmen and women should not be sent into combat without congressional authorization. The bill has received bipartisan support and opposition as well as support from the Libertarian Party. Support of the bill has been incorporated into the Maine and New Hampshire GOP platforms.

== Proposed state legislation ==
In 2022, Oklahoma state senator Nathan Dahm filed the Defend the Guard act (SB29). He stated, “It is my hope that it will curtail the federal government’s ability to use Oklahomans for endless wars without congressional oversight or accountability” as rationale for filing the bill.

In 2024, Idaho state senator Ben Adams filed the legislation as well (SB1252). This filing led some military personnel to believe that the passage of this bill would result in federal funding of the Idaho National Guard to be cut. Senator Adams said this was unlikely since one of Idaho's federal congressmen was the third highest ranking member on the Appropriations Committee and would protect state funding.

In 2024, the bill was filed in the New Hampshire house by members of both parties (HB229).

In 2025, Maine state representative Benjamin Hymes, along with other Republican, Democrat, and Independent co-sponsors, filed the bill. Former Maine senator Eric Brakey, brought modern foreign policy implications of the bill stating, "Donald Trump is president now, and I imagine you might not want him to have unchecked power over sending our troops into war without an act of Congress." Opponents highlighted concerns regarding federal funding of the state national guard.

As of 2025, Defend the Guard has not been signed into law in any U.S. state.
