= Nancy Gregory (politician) =

American politician

Member-elect of the Idaho Senate from the 15th district
- Assuming office January 2027
- Succeeding: Codi Galloway

Nancy Gregory is an American politician. A Democrat, she is a member-elect of the Idaho Senate from the 15th district. She defeated Republican challenger Desi Burbank in the 2026 Idaho Senate election, replacing retiring incumbent Codi Galloway. Prior to running for the state Senate, Gregory served on the school board of Boise, Idaho for 24 years.
