= John Andreason =

American politician from Idaho

Member of the Idaho Senate
- In office 1995 – November 30, 2012
- Preceded by: Rod Beck
- Succeeded by: Fred Martin
- Constituency: 15th district

Personal details
- Born: April 20, 1929 Idaho Falls, Idaho
- Died: October 16, 2017 (aged 88) Boise, Idaho
- Party: Republican
- Spouse: Darlene Andreason
- Profession: Retired Director of Legislative Budget Office

Military service
- Allegiance: United States
- Branch/service: United States Air Force
- Years of service: 1950 – 1958
- Rank: Master Sergeant
- Battles/wars: Korean War

John C. Andreason (April 20, 1929 – October 16, 2017) was an American politician.

== Life and career ==
John Andreason was born in Idaho Falls, Idaho, and lived in Boise, Idaho. Andreason graduated from Arco High School in 1947. Andreason attended Idaho State University and received his B.S. in political science from the University of Idaho in 1974.

He was a master sergeant for the United States Air Force from 1950 to 1958. Before becoming a senator, Andreason was the director of the Idaho Legislative Budget Office for 23 years. Andreason served in many civic organizations and held many political offices. Andreason served a term from 1969 to 1970 in the Idaho State Senate before he was elected again in 1995. Andreason served until 2012.

He was married to Darlene Andreason and they had four children together. Andreason was a member of the Church of Jesus Christ of Latter-day Saints. Andreason died from liver cancer on October 16, 2017, in Boise, Idaho.

== Committees ==
Andreason is served on the following committees:

- Commerce and Human Resources - Chair
- Education

== Civic organizations ==
Past and Present organizations, charity involvement:

- Past Deputy District Governor, Loins International
- Past Staff Chair, National Conference of State Legislatures (NCSL)
- President, National Fiscal Officers Association
- Member of NCSL Executive Committee
- Treasurer of the National Education Commission of the States
- Past vice-chair of the National Education Commission of the States

== Political organizations ==
Dates and Titles of previously held political offices:

- Senator, Idaho State Senate, 1969–70, 1995–2012
- County Chair, Republican Party, 1964–1968
- State Committeeman, 1960–1964
- Precinct Committeeman, 1955–1960
- Former Member of the Arco, Idaho City Council
