= Fred Martin (politician) =

American politician

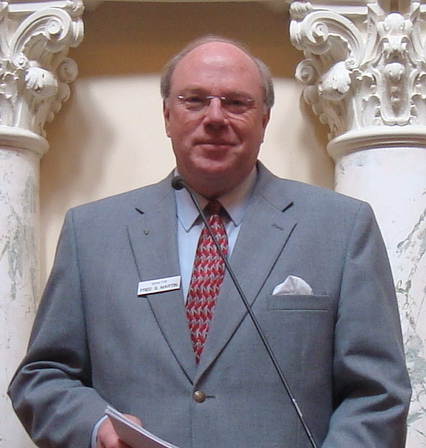

Member of the Idaho Senate
- In office December 1, 2012 – November 30, 2022
- Preceded by: John Andreason
- Succeeded by: Rick Just
- Constituency: 15th district

Personal details
- Born: Tyhee, Idaho
- Party: Republican
- Education: Brigham Young University–Idaho
- Website: fredsmartin.com

Military service
- Allegiance: United States
- Branch/service: Idaho Army National Guard

Fred S. Martin (born April 3, 1950) is an American politician and a Republican former member of the Idaho State Senate, representing District 15 from 2012 until 2022.

== Elections ==
Martin, a Republican, ran for re-election to the Idaho State Senate to represent District 15. He lost in the Republican primary on May 17, 2022.

District 15 Senate - Part of Ada County
Year	Candidate	Votes	Pct	Candidate	Votes	Pct
2012 Primary	Fred S. Martin	2,389	100%			
2012 General	Fred S. Martin	9,545	52.1%	Betty Richardson	8,783	47.9%
2014 Primary	Fred S. Martin (incumbent)	2,034	60.3%	Diego Rodriguez	1,339	39.7%
2014 General	Fred S. Martin (incumbent)	7,244	57.7%	Richard Keller	5,302	42.3%
2016 Primary	Fred S. Martin (incumbent)	2,186	100.0%			
2016 General	Fred S. Martin (incumbent)	10,580	56.3%	Laura Metzler	8,203	43.7%
2018 Primary	Fred S. Martin (incumbent)	2,837	67.2%	Sarah A. Clendenon	1,382	32.8%
2018 General	Fred S. Martin (incumbent)	8,948	50.0%	Jim Bratnober	8,942	50.0%
2020 Primary	Fred S. Martin (incumbent)	3,322	75.5%	Sarah A. Clendenon	1,078	24.5%
2020 General	Fred S. Martin (incumbent)	12,009	53.0%	Rick Just	10,654	47.0%
2022 Primary	Fred S. Martin (incumbent)	2,853	41.23%	Codi Galloway	3,668	53.01%

== Idaho State Senate ==
=== Committee assignments ===
Senator Martin served as the Chairman of the Senate Health and Welfare Committee. He also served on the Commerce and Human Resources Committee, the Economic Outlook and Revenue Assessment Committee, the Joint Millennium Fund, and Joint Occupational Licensing and Certification Laws Interim Committee. Martin also served as co-Vice Chairman of the Joint Finance and Appropriations Committee from 2017-2019.

=== Board memberships ===
Senator Martin sits on the Idaho Council on Suicide Prevention, the Idaho Health and Welfare Board, Idaho State Insurance Advisory Committee, Idaho TeleHealth Taskforce and Idaho Welfare Steering Committee.

=
