= Brian Lenney =

American politician

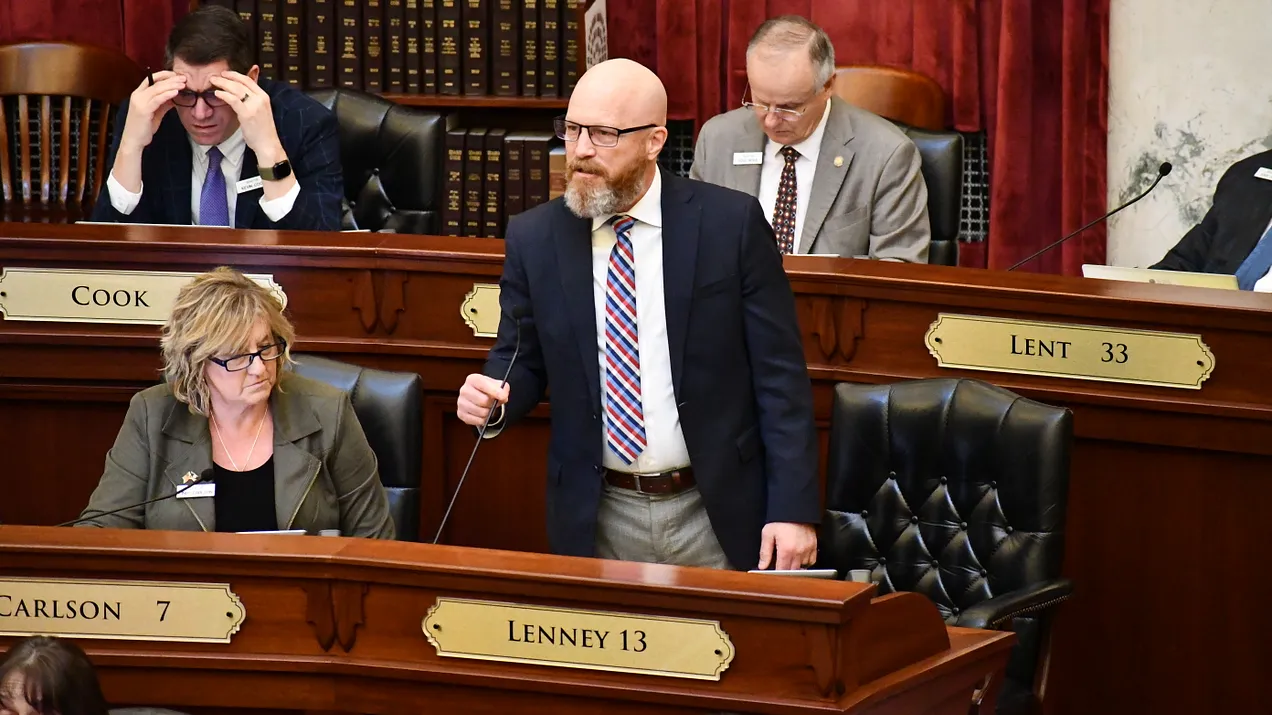

Member of the Idaho Senate from the 13th district
- Incumbent
- Assumed office December 1, 2022
- Preceded by: Jeff Agenbroad

Personal details
- Born: Corona, California, U.S.
- Party: Republican
- Education: University of North Dakota (BA); Biola University (MA)
- Profession: Direct-response Copywriter
- Committees: Senate Commerce & Human Resources (Vice Chair); Senate Health & Welfare; Senate Judiciary & Rules
- Website: https://www.votelenney.com/

Brian Lenney is an American politician serving as a member of the Idaho Senate for the 13th district. He assumed office on December 1, 2022.

In the Idaho Senate, Lenney has sponsored the state's first anti-SLAPP law and its first anti-mask mandate law, authored the 2026 amendment restricting public school support for teachers' unions, and has been among the legislature's leading advocates for state-level immigration enforcement.

He has self-published two children's books, Why Everyone Needs an AR-15: A Guide for Kids and Why is Feminism So Silly? A Guide for Kids.

== Early life and education ==
Lenney was born in Corona, California. He earned a Bachelor of Arts degree from the University of North Dakota in 2007, and a Master of Arts from Biola University in 2010.

== Career ==
Lenney is a direct-response copywriter. He was elected to the Idaho Senate in November 2022 when he defeated incumbent Jeff C. Agenbroad by +15% in the Republican primary for Idaho State Senate District 13 on May 17, 2022. He defeated Jeff Agenbroad once again in the 2024 Idaho Republican primary election, winning by more than 11%. In the 2024 general election he received 74.5% of the votes, while Democrat Sarah Butler received only 25.5%.

=== Removal from committee leadership ===
On November 6, 2023, Senate President Pro Tempore Chuck Winder wrote to Lenney informing him that he would be removed as vice chair of the Senate Commerce and Human Resources Committee. Winder's letter said Lenney had "aggressively attacked, disparaged, and degraded" fellow senators, Senate leadership, and members of the public, and had violated rules governing decorum. No specific incident was identified. Winder took similar action against Senator Glenneda Zuiderveld and reprimanded Senator Scott Herndon in the same period; all three are members of the Idaho Freedom Caucus.

Responding in a Freedom Caucus press release, Lenney said he had not spoken with Winder in over seven months and had received no warning, and said he served the people rather than the Senate leader. The Ada County Republican Central Committee passed a resolution in December 2023 criticizing Winder's use of that authority, and Winder was defeated in the May 2024 Republican primary. Lenney was named vice chair of the same committee again in December 2024.

== Legislative record ==
=== 2023 session ===
Lenney sponsored Senate Bill 1029, which prohibits child protection investigations or determinations of parental rights based on a child's immunization status. He co-sponsored House Bill 295, restricting firearms-specific merchant category codes, and House Bill 292, a property tax relief measure.

=== 2024 session ===
Lenney was Senate floor sponsor of two House bills that became law. House Bill 572 preempts Idaho cities and counties from establishing guaranteed income programs not expressly authorized by state statute; the Senate passed it 27–7 and Governor Brad Little signed it on March 28, 2024. House Bill 670, the End Organ Harvesting Act, also restricts certain genetic sequencing technologies produced by foreign adversary nations; it passed the Senate 34–0 and was signed April 8, 2024.

=== Anti-SLAPP legislation ===
Lenney sponsored Senate Bill 1001 in 2025, establishing Idaho's first statutory protections against strategic lawsuits against public participation. Speaking on the Senate floor, Lenney said Idaho was one of fifteen states without such protections, and that the lawsuits the bill addressed were designed not to be won but to impose legal costs on defendants exercising free speech rights. Under the law, filing an anti-SLAPP motion stays the underlying lawsuit, and the prevailing party may recover attorney fees.

The Idaho Senate passed the bill 32–1, with Senate President Pro Tempore Kelly Anthon casting the only opposing vote. Governor Little signed the bill in March 2025.

=== 2025 session ===
Lenney also sponsored Idaho's first anti-mask mandate bill (H32) and a bill limiting the authority of Idaho's public health districts (S1031). He sponsored Senate Bill 1052, making Department of Health and Welfare bureau chiefs removable at will, and co-sponsored the Medical Ethics Defense Act (H59a).

=== Public assistance and the Idaho Child Care Program ===
Lenney was Senate floor sponsor of House Bill 90 in 2025, which requires legislative approval before state agencies expand eligibility criteria or benefit levels for public assistance programs. He described the bill as removing authority from Health and Welfare administrators, citing a $15 million overrun in the state's child care program the previous year. The House passed it 65–2 and the Senate 30–5; Little signed it on March 19, 2025.

Lenney became one of the Idaho Child Care Program's most persistent legislative critics. In a December 31, 2025 letter co-signed with Representative Josh Tanner, he asked Health and Welfare Director Juliet Charron to suspend solicitations, contracts, and disbursements tied to $14 million in federal child care funding the Legislature had approved in 2025, pending stronger fraud-prevention safeguards. The lawmakers cited federal enforcement actions in Minnesota involving child care subsidies. The letter did not allege fraud in Idaho's program.

Charron replied on January 12, 2026 that the funds had not yet been distributed to providers, and that of more than 1,000 random audits covering a quarter of the state's providers, 45 had resulted in removal from the program or in license suspension or revocation. She pledged to review all past providers within two months.

In March 2026, Charron told the Joint Finance-Appropriations Committee that the child care program was not established anywhere in Idaho Code, and warned that without new legislation the department would have to wind the program down. Lenney and Senator Josh Keyser then asked the Idaho Attorney General's Office whether the department had statutory authority to continue operating the program. On March 19, 2026, the Attorney General's Office concluded that the department did have sufficient legal authority.

Senate Bill 1419 would have written the program into state law while lowering the income eligibility ceiling for a family of four from $57,750 to $44,550 a year, cutting the asset cap from $1 million to $500,000, and sunsetting the program in July 2028. Idaho Voices for Children opposed the bill, saying the lower thresholds would remove families from the program and set an asset cap below the federal standard and below those in 48 other states. Lenney voted to advance the bill in committee, arguing the Legislature could not pretend the program did not exist and that the bill would put lawmakers back in control of it. He voted against it on the Senate floor, where it was rejected on March 26, 2026. The separate health and welfare maintenance budget, Senate Bill 1435, passed the same week and included roughly $64 million for the program while removing $14 million in unspent capacity expansion funds.

=== 2026 session ===
Lenney was Senate floor sponsor of House Bill 602, which bars Idaho courts from applying foreign law that does not afford the fundamental rights guaranteed by the United States and Idaho constitutions. The Senate passed it 28–6 and Little signed it March 26, 2026.

He co-sponsored Senate Bill 1322, requiring voters using an identification affidavit to provide a date of birth or driver's license number and requiring election judges to verify that information before issuing a ballot. The bill passed both chambers unanimously and was signed March 31, 2026. The American Civil Liberties Union of Idaho opposed the bill, saying the added requirements created barriers for transgender voters who use affidavits to avoid difficulties when their identification does not match their gender presentation. A separate bill he introduced to eliminate voter affidavits entirely, Senate Bill 1237, did not advance out of committee.

=== Teachers' union legislation ===
Proposals to bar Idaho public schools from using taxpayer resources to support teachers' unions had circulated for several sessions without passing. In 2026, House Bill 745, sponsored by Representative Judy Boyle, passed the House but was held in the Senate Education Committee by chairman Dan Foreman.

On March 30, 2026, Lenney and Senator Cindy Carlson moved to amend House Bill 516, a three-page bill on instruction about sexual orientation and gender identity, by striking its contents and inserting ten pages of teachers' union provisions. The maneuver, known at the Idaho Statehouse as "radiator capping," bypassed the Education Committee, and the motion passed narrowly. The following day the Senate rejected a motion to return the rewritten bill to committee for a public hearing, on a 16–19 vote that split Senate Republican leadership. Lenney, described by Idaho Education News as the amendment's architect, argued that a referral would only delay the outcome.

Presenting the bill on the Senate floor, Lenney said Idaho schools collected $4.4 million in teachers' union dues through taxpayer-funded payroll systems, of which $1.1 million went to the National Education Association, and that the question was whether Idaho taxpayers should fund the administrative operations of a private national political organization. He said the bill did not prevent teachers from joining unions or affect collective bargaining.

The Senate passed the amended bill 20–14 and the House concurred 43–24 on April 2, the eighty-first and final day of the session. Little signed it April 10, 2026, effective July 1. The law bars districts from deducting union dues through payroll systems, providing paid leave for union activity without reimbursement, distributing union communications, or requiring employees to interact with a teachers' union. Idaho Education Association spokesman Mike Journee disputed the characterization of dues as taxpayer money, saying the funds were earned by members, and said the law's broader provisions would restrict members' ability to organize at their worksites.

== Political positions ==
Lenney has been among the Idaho legislators pushing for state-level immigration enforcement. In February 2026 he was one of fourteen lawmakers who announced a slate of immigration proposals developed with Theo Wold, a former Idaho solicitor general and Heritage Foundation fellow. At the February 3 event announcing the proposals, Lenney described immigration as a human rights issue and said the situation was "about demographic replacement," which he attributed to refugee resettlement programs, human trafficking, and low-cost labor. An Idaho State University sociologist discussing the remarks at a public forum in Pocatello connected them to the Great Replacement conspiracy theory.

Lenney sponsored House Bill 659 in the Senate, which would have required every local law enforcement agency in Idaho to apply for a 287(g) agreement with U.S. Immigration and Customs Enforcement. The bill passed the House 41–27 but was rejected by the Senate State Affairs Committee in March 2026 after opposition from the Idaho Sheriffs' Association and the Idaho Chiefs of Police Association, which argued the mandate was an overstep and that agencies already cooperated with ICE voluntarily. Pocatello Police Chief Roger Schei said the requirement risked turning routine policing into document checks, and that jails already verify immigration status during booking. None of the roughly fourteen immigration bills introduced in 2026 became law. Lenney has described Idaho Republicans as divided into "MAGA, America-first," mainstream, and moderate factions, and identifies with the first.
