= Idaho Legislature =

Legislative branch of the state government of Idaho

Type
- Type: Bicameral
- Houses: Senate; House of Representatives

Leadership
- Senate President: Scott Bedke (R) since January 2, 2023
- Senate President pro tempore: Kelly Anthon (R) since December 5, 2024
- House Speaker: Mike Moyle (R) since December 1, 2022

Structure
- Seats: 105 voting members: 35 senators; 70 representatives
- State Senate political groups: Republican (29); Democratic (6)
- House of Representatives political groups: Republican (61); Democratic (9)

Elections
- Last State Senate election: November 3, 2026
- Last House of Representatives election: November 3, 2026
- Next State Senate election: November 5, 2028
- Next House of Representatives election: November 5, 2028

Meeting place
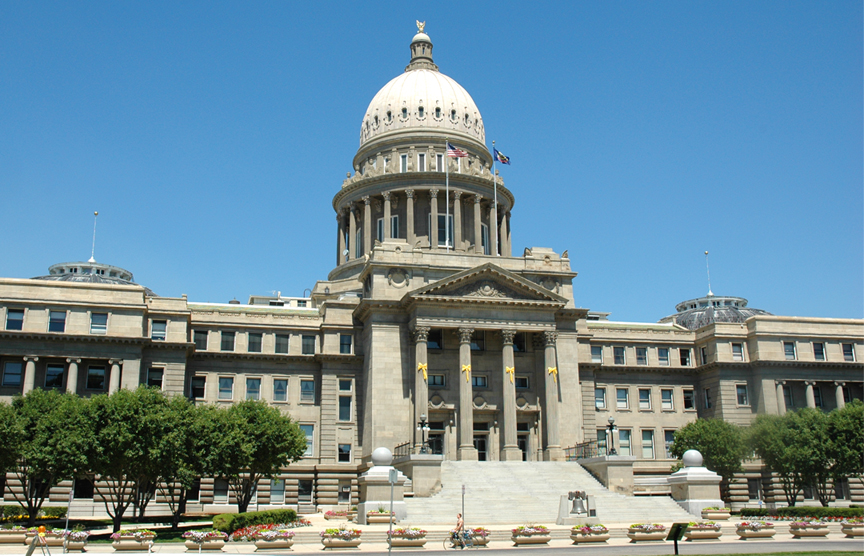
- Idaho State Capitol; Boise

Website
- Idaho Legislature

The Idaho Legislature is the legislative branch of the government of the U.S. state of Idaho and is bicameral, consisting of the upper chamber of the Idaho Senate and the lower chamber of the Idaho House of Representatives. The state of Idaho is divided into 35 legislative districts, which each elect one state senator and two representatives. There are no term limits for reelection of members of either chamber. Both chambers of the Legislature convene at the Idaho State Capitol in Boise.

The crossing of upper and lower chamber of their districts into a single representing constituency is found in only seven of the fifty U.S. state legislatures, these are: Idaho, Arizona, Maryland, New Jersey, North Dakota, South Dakota, and Washington. Based on 2010 United States Decennial Census data, each legislative district in the state of Idaho had approximately 44,788 residents. Based on subsequent 2020 U.S. Decennial Census data, each legislative district had an ideal population of approximately 52,546 people if population was split perfectly even.

== History ==
The first Idaho legislature convened in December 1890.

== Elections and composition ==
Members of the Idaho Legislature were originally elected by county, but in recent times districts apportioned by population have replaced representation by county.

Today members of the Idaho Legislature are elected from 35 districts throughout the state. Some districts include several counties, while others are located entirely within a single county. Ada County, the state's largest by population, currently has nine legislative districts within its boundaries (as of the 2010 redistricting, Ada County has Legislative Districts 14, 15, 16 17, 18, 19, 20, 21 and 22.)

All 105 members are elected simultaneously every two years on the same day as the federal election day in early November.

== Districts ==
Each district is represented by one senator and two representatives. Idaho has fourteen committees in the House of Representatives and ten committees in the Senate. As of 2026, there are thirty-five members in the Senate with twenty-three men and twelve women. The House of Representatives has seventy members with fifty-three men and seventeen women.

Districts are reapportioned every 10 years. The next reapportionment is expected to occur after the 2030 census and take effect as of the 2032 election.

In the 1980s voters elected legislators from two districts, a smaller local district and a larger "floterial" district which often encompassed an entire region of the state. Legislative seats in floterial districts were last contested in 1990. Today floterial districts are prohibited by the Idaho Constitution.

== Responsibilities ==
According to the Legislature's website, the Idaho Legislature is responsible for translating the public will into policy for the state, levying taxes, appropriating public funds, and overseeing the administration of state agencies. These responsibilities are carried out through the legislative process - laws passed by elected representatives of the people, legislators.

== Location and time of operation ==
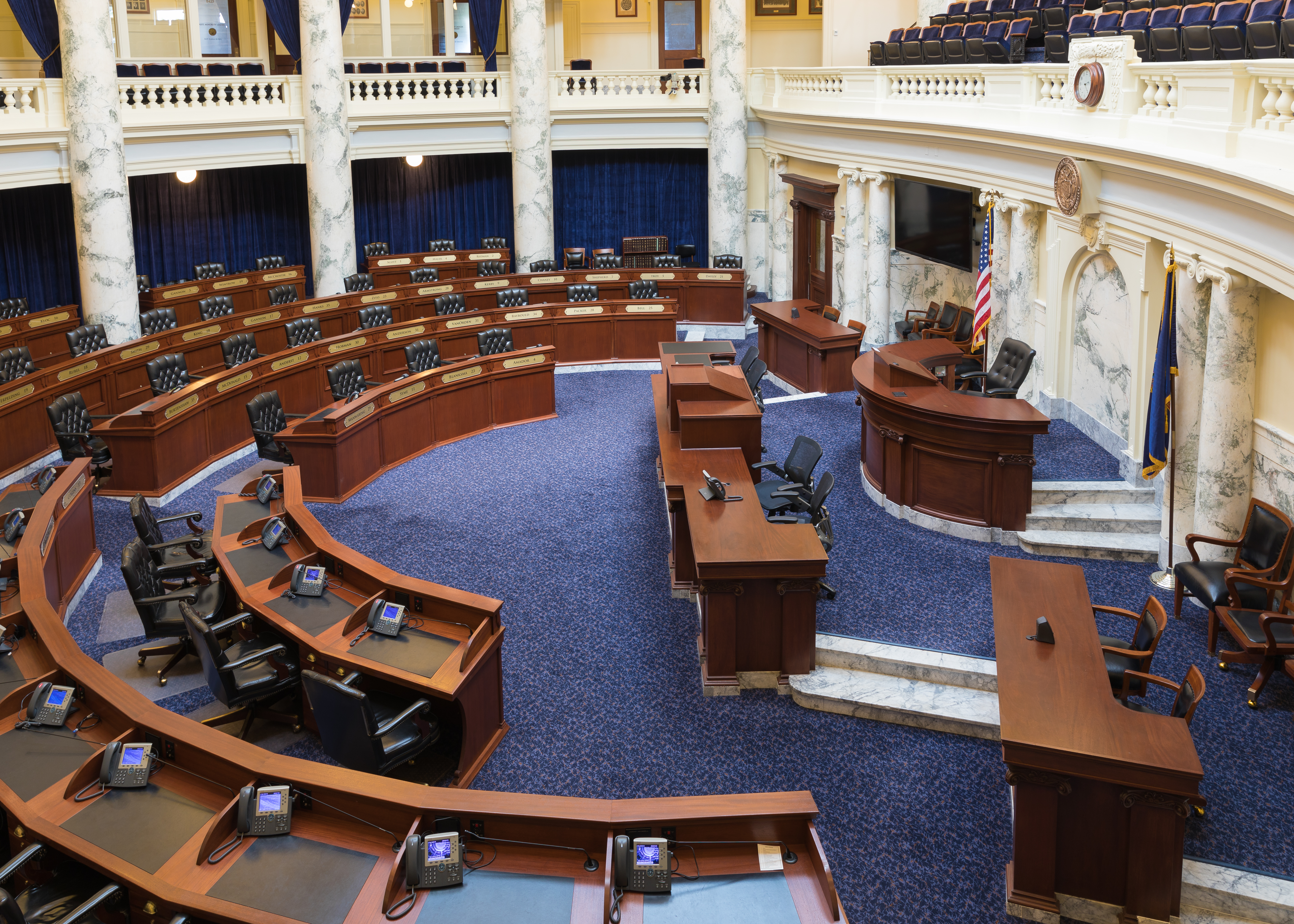
Chamber of the House of Representatives in 2018

The Idaho Legislature normally convenes at the Idaho State Capitol in downtown Boise. The Legislature meets annually from January until mid-March, although sessions have been known to last into May. The governor of Idaho may also call special sessions at any time.

The Idaho State Capitol Commission was created by Governor Phil Batt in 1998. The Commission undertook the leading role of extensively remodeling the capitol building starting in 2007. The 2008 and 2009 sessions of the Idaho Legislature met in converted courtrooms in the old Ada County Courthouse. The capitol building was official re-opened and re-dedicated on January 9, 2010.

== See also ==
- List of Idaho state legislatures
