= Chuck Winder =

American politician

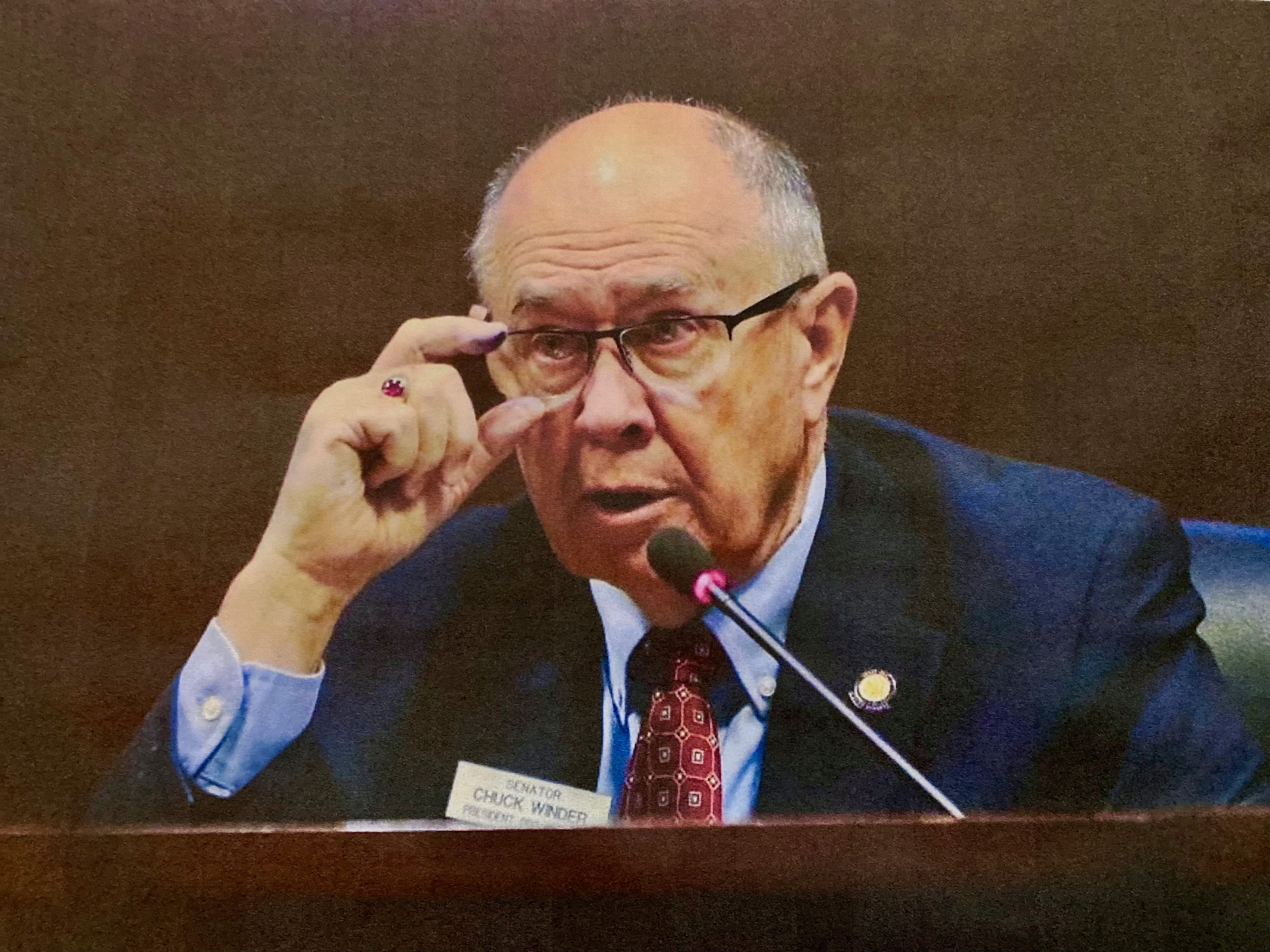

41st President pro tempore of the Idaho Senate
- In office December 3, 2020 – November 30, 2024
- Preceded by: Brent Hill
- Succeeded by: Kelly Anthon

Majority Leader of the Idaho Senate
- In office September 21, 2017 – December 1, 2020
- Preceded by: Bart Davis
- Succeeded by: Kelly Anthon

Member of the Idaho Senate
- In office December 1, 2008 – November 30, 2024
- Preceded by: Stan Bastian
- Succeeded by: Josh Keyser
- Constituency: 14th district (2008–2012); 20th district (2012–2024)

Personal details
- Born: November 21, 1945 (age 80) Ontario, Oregon, U.S.
- Party: Republican
- Spouse: Dianne Winder
- Education: College of Idaho (BA)

Chuck Winder (born November 21, 1945) is an American politician and former Republican member of the Idaho Senate. He served as the president pro tempore of the Idaho Senate and as the majority leader. He is married to Dianne Winder; the couple has two children.

Winder was first elected to the Idaho Senate in 2008. In 2024 primary, Winder was defeated by conservative challenger Josh Keyser.

== Early life, education, and career ==
Winder joined the United States Navy where he served for four years on active duty as a naval aviator and for eight years on inactive reserve. He received a bachelor's degree in political science and pre-law from the College of Idaho.

Winder is a commercial real estate brokerage.

== Political career ==
He ran for the Republican nomination in 1994 for Governor of Idaho losing with 13.5% of the vote.

He is a former member of the Ada County Highway District Commission. He previously served on both the Boise City Design Review Committee and the Boise Planning and Zoning Commission.

In 2003, Winder ran for mayor of Boise, Idaho, but lost to David H. Bieter.

From 2005 through 2008, Winder was a co-chair of the Treasure Valley's Coalition for Regional Public Transportation. In 2008, the coalition merged with the statewide Moving Idaho Forward organization.

Winder serves as the president pro tempore of the Idaho Senate, and previously served as majority leader.

Winder lost the Republican nomination on May 21, 2024.

District 14 Senate - Part of Ada County
Year	Candidate	Votes	Pct	Candidate	Votes	Pct	Candidate	Votes	Pct	Candidate	Votes	Pct
2008 Primary	Chuck Winder	2,715	42.7%	Stan Bastian (incumbent)	2,076	32.6%	Saundra McDavid	1,327	20.8%	Henry Kulczyk	247	3.9%
2008 General	Chuck Winder	27,253	100%									
2010 Primary	Chuck Winder (incumbent)	6,762	100%									
2010 General	Chuck Winder (incumbent)	20,674	100%									

District 20 Senate - Part of Ada County
Year	Candidate	Votes	Pct	Candidate	Votes	Pct
2012 Primary	Chuck Winder (incumbent)	2,290	55.5%			
2012 General	Chuck Winder (incumbent)	12,303	68.4%	James Mace	5,695	31.6%
2014 Primary	Chuck Winder (incumbent)	2,642	100%			
2014 General	Chuck Winder (incumbent)	10,155	100%			
2016 Primary	Chuck Winder (incumbent)	2,000	100%			
2016 General	Chuck Winder (incumbent)	13,787	67.9%	Bill Rutherford	6,525	32.1%

In the Republican Party presidential primaries, 2012 Winder supported Mitt Romney.

== Organizations ==
- Lifetime member of United States Navy League
- Vice President of Ore-Ida Council, Boy Scouts of America, 4 years
- Boise Metro Economic Development Council
- Children's Home Society of Idaho.
- Junior Achievement of Idaho (former president)
- Co-chairman Treasure Valley Transit Coalition
- Board of Directors Jeker Family Trust
- Board of Directors Children's Home Society of Idaho
- Boise Chamber of Commerce
- Valley Initiative for Prosperity
- Co-founder and initial President, Joint School District #2, Education Foundation
- Idaho Coordinator for the National Prayer Breakfast
- Chairman of the Idaho Transportation Board, 11 years
- Co-chairman of the Governor's Blue Ribbon Task Force
- Trustee at Albertson's College of Idaho, 12 years
- Bible Study Fellowship (Boise Evening Men's), 20+ years
- Boise City Planning & Zoning Commission, 3 years
- Boise City Design & Review Committee, 4 years
- Ada County Highway District Commission, 12.5 years
- Ada Planning Association, 12.5 years

Idaho Senate
Preceded by Bart Davis	Majority Leader of the Idaho Senate; 2017–2020	Succeeded by Kelly Anthon
Preceded by Brent Hill	President pro tempore of the Idaho Senate; 2020–2024	Succeeded by Kelly Anthon
