= Idaho's 13th legislative district =

American legislative district

Idaho's 13th legislative district is one of 35 districts of the Idaho Legislature. It is currently represented by Senator Brian Lenney, Republican of Nampa, Rep. Brent Crane, Republican of Nampa, and Rep. Steve Tanner, Republican of Nampa.

== District profile ==
=== 1992–2002 ===
From 1992 to 2002, District 13 consisted of a portion of Ada County.

Legislature	Session	Senate	House Seat A	House Seat B
51st (1992 - 1994)	1st	Sheila Sorensen (R)	Pam Ahrens (R)	Jim Hansen (D)
51st (1992 - 1994)	2nd	Sheila Sorensen (R)	Pam Ahrens (R)	Jim Hansen (D)
52nd (1994 - 1996)	1st	Sheila Sorensen (R)	Debbie Field (R)	Dave Baumann (R)
52nd (1994 - 1996)	2nd	Sheila Sorensen (R)	Debbie Field (R)	Dave Baumann (R)
53rd (1996 - 1998)	1st	Sheila Sorensen (R)	Debbie Field (R)	Julie Ellsworth (R)
53rd (1996 - 1998)	2nd	Sheila Sorensen (R)	Debbie Field (R)	Julie Ellsworth (R)
54th (1998 - 2000)	1st	Sheila Sorensen (R)	Debbie Field (R)	Julie Ellsworth (R)
54th (1998 - 2000)	2nd	Sheila Sorensen (R)	Debbie Field (R)	Julie Ellsworth (R)
55th (2000 - 2002)	1st	Sheila Sorensen (R)	Debbie Field (R)	Julie Ellsworth (R)
55th (2000 - 2002)	2nd	Sheila Sorensen (R)	Debbie Field (R)	Julie Ellsworth (R)

=== 2002–2012 ===
From 2002 to 2012, District 13 consisted of a portion of Canyon County.

Legislature	Session	Senate	House Seat A	House Seat B
57th (2002 - 2004)	1st	Patti Anne Lodge (R)	Dolores Crow (R)	Bill Deal (R)
57th (2002 - 2004)	2nd	Patti Anne Lodge (R)	Dolores Crow (R)	Bill Deal (R)
58th (2004 - 2006)	1st	Patti Anne Lodge (R)	Dolores Crow (R)	Bill Deal (R)
58th (2004 - 2006)	2nd	Patti Anne Lodge (R)	Dolores Crow (R)	Bill Deal (R)
59th (2006 - 2008)	1st	Patti Anne Lodge (R)	Brent Crane (R)	Stephen Kren (R)
59th (2006 - 2008)	2nd	Patti Anne Lodge (R)	Brent Crane (R)	Stephen Kren (R)
60th (2008 - 2010)	1st	Patti Anne Lodge (R)	Brent Crane (R)	Stephen Kren (R)
60th (2008 - 2010)	2nd	Patti Anne Lodge (R)	Brent Crane (R)	Stephen Kren (R)
61st (2010 - 2012)	1st	Patti Anne Lodge (R)	Brent Crane (R)	Christy Perry (R)
61st (2010 - 2012)	2nd	Patti Anne Lodge (R)	Brent Crane (R)	Christy Perry (R)

=== 2012–2022 ===
District 13 currently consists of a portion of Canyon County.

Legislature	Session	Senate	House Seat A	House Seat B
62nd (2012 - 2014)	1st	Curt McKenzie (R)	Brent Crane (R)	Gary Collins (R)
62nd (2012 - 2014)	2nd	Curt McKenzie (R)	Brent Crane (R)	Gary Collins (R)
63rd (2014 - 2016)	1st	Curt McKenzie (R)	Brent Crane (R)	Gary Collins (R)
63rd (2014 - 2016)	2nd	Curt McKenzie (R)	Brent Crane (R)	Gary Collins (R)
64th (2016 - 2018)	1st	Jeff Agenbroad (R)	Brent Crane (R)	Gary Collins (R)
64th (2016 - 2018)	2nd	Jeff Agenbroad (R)	Brent Crane (R)	Gary Collins (R)
65th (2018 - 2020)	1st	Jeff Agenbroad (R)	Brent Crane (R)	Gary Collins (R)
65th (2018 - 2020)	2nd	Jeff Agenbroad (R)	Brent Crane (R)	Gary Collins (R)
66th (2020 - 2022)	1st	Jeff Agenbroad (R)	Brent Crane (R)	Ben Adams (R)
66th (2020 - 2022)	2nd	Jeff Agenbroad (R)	Brent Crane (R)	Ben Adams (R)

=== 2022–present ===
Legislature	Session	Senate	House Seat A	House Seat B
67th (2022 - 2024)	1st	Brian Lenney (R)	Brent Crane (R)	Kenny Wroten (R)
67th (2022 - 2024)	2nd	Brian Lenney (R)	Brent Crane (R)	Kenny Wroten (R)
68th (2024 - 2026)	1st	Brian Lenney (R)	Brent Crane (R)	Steve Tanner (R)
68th (2024 - 2026)	2nd	Brian Lenney (R)	Brent Crane (R)	Steve Tanner (R)

== See also ==
- List of Idaho senators
- List of Idaho representatives
