= Idaho's 14th legislative district =

American legislative district

Idaho's 14th legislative district is one of 35 districts of the Idaho Legislature. It is currently represented by Cecil Scott Grow, Republican of Eagle, Mike Moyle, Republican of Star, and Gayann DeMordaunt, Republican of Eagle.

== District profile ==
=== 1992–2002 ===
From 1992 to 2002, District 14 consisted of a portion of Ada County.

Legislature	Session	Senate	House Seat A	House Seat B
51st (1992 - 1994)	1st	Herb Carlson (R)	Dave Bivens (R)	Al Lance (R)
51st (1992 - 1994)	2nd	Herb Carlson (R)	Dave Bivens (R)	Al Lance (R)
52nd (1994 - 1996)	1st	Hal Bunderson (R)	Dave Bivens (R)	Milt Erhart (R)
52nd (1994 - 1996)	2nd	Hal Bunderson (R)	Dave Bivens (R)	Milt Erhart (R)
53rd (1996 - 1998)	1st	Hal Bunderson (R)	Dave Bivens (R)	Shirley McKague (R)
53rd (1996 - 1998)	2nd	Hal Bunderson (R)	Dave Bivens (R)	Shirley McKague (R)
54th (1998 - 2000)	1st	Hal Bunderson (R)	Mike Moyle (R)	Shirley McKague (R)
54th (1998 - 2000)	2nd	Hal Bunderson (R)	Mike Moyle (R)	Shirley McKague (R)
55th (2000 - 2002)	1st	Hal Bunderson (R)	Mike Moyle (R)	Shirley McKague (R)
55th (2000 - 2002)	2nd	Hal Bunderson (R)	Mike Moyle (R)	Shirley McKague (R)

=== 2002–2012 ===
From 2002 to 2012, District 14 consisted of a portion of Ada County.

Legislature	Session	Senate	House Seat A	House Seat B
57th (2002 - 2004)	1st	Hal Bunderson (R)	Mike Moyle (R)	Henry Kulczyk (R)
57th (2002 - 2004)	2nd	Hal Bunderson (R)	Mike Moyle (R)	Henry Kulczyk (R)
58th (2004 - 2006)	1st	Hal Bunderson (R)	Mike Moyle (R)	Stan Bastian (R)
58th (2004 - 2006)	2nd	Hal Bunderson (R)	Mike Moyle (R)	Stan Bastian (R)
59th (2006 - 2008)	1st	Stan Bastian (R)	Mike Moyle (R)	Raúl Labrador (R)
59th (2006 - 2008)	2nd	Stan Bastian (R)	Mike Moyle (R)	Raúl Labrador (R)
60th (2008 - 2010)	1st	Chuck Winder (R)	Mike Moyle (R)	Raúl Labrador (R)
60th (2008 - 2010)	2nd	Chuck Winder (R)	Mike Moyle (R)	Raúl Labrador (R)
61st (2010 - 2012)	1st	Chuck Winder (R)	Mike Moyle (R)	Reed DeMordaunt (R)
61st (2010 - 2012)	2nd	Chuck Winder (R)	Mike Moyle (R)	Reed DeMordaunt (R)

=== 2012–2022 ===
District 14 currently consists of a portion of Ada County.

Legislature	Session	Senate	House Seat A	House Seat B
62nd (2012 - 2014)	1st	Marv Hagedorn (R)	Mike Moyle (R)	Reed DeMordaunt (R)
62nd (2012 - 2014)	2nd	Marv Hagedorn (R)	Mike Moyle (R)	Reed DeMordaunt (R)
63rd (2014 - 2016)	1st	Marv Hagedorn (R)	Mike Moyle (R)	Reed DeMordaunt (R)
63rd (2014 - 2016)	2nd	Marv Hagedorn (R)	Mike Moyle (R)	Reed DeMordaunt (R)
64th (2016 - 2018)	1st	Marv Hagedorn (R)	Mike Moyle (R)	Gayann DeMordaunt (R)
64th (2016 - 2018)	2nd	Marv Hagedorn (R)	Mike Moyle (R)	Gayann DeMordaunt (R)
65th (2018 - 2020)	1st	C. Scott Grow (R)	Mike Moyle (R)	Gayann DeMordaunt (R)
65th (2018 - 2020)	2nd	C. Scott Grow (R)	Mike Moyle (R)	Gayann DeMordaunt (R)
66th (2020 - 2022)	1st	C. Scott Grow (R)	Mike Moyle (R)	Gayann DeMordaunt (R)
66th (2020 - 2022)	2nd	C. Scott Grow (R)	Mike Moyle (R)	Gayann DeMordaunt (R)

=== 2022–present ===
Beginning in December 2022, District 14 will consist of Gem County and a portion of Ada County.

== See also ==
- List of Idaho senators
- List of Idaho representatives
