= List of presidents pro tempore of the Idaho Senate =

American politician

President pro tempore of the Idaho Senate

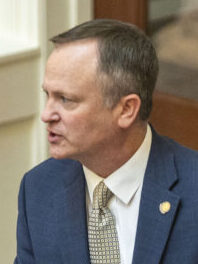
- Incumbent; Kelly Anthon since 2024
- Inaugural holder: John S. Gray

This is a complete list of individuals who have served as president pro tempore of the Idaho Senate to the present. The president pro tempore, often abbreviated to "the pro tem", is a senator chosen from the majority party and elected by the entire Senate. The senator occupying this position will preside over the Senate in the absence of the lieutenant governor or will assign another senator to preside in his stead. When the pro tem or his designee presides over the Senate, they maintain their ability to vote on all matters before the Senate, whereas the lieutenant governor only has a vote in the case of tie.

The pro tem is also second in line in succession to the governor. When both the governor and lieutenant governor are out of the state the pro tem serves temporarily as acting governor until their return. When a vacancy arises in the office of lieutenant governor the pro tem serves as acting lieutenant governor until governor appoints and the Senate confirms a successor. The pro tem is also the leader of the majority party. The office has both administrative and policy roles, though the bulk of work on the Senate floor is largely delegated to the majority leadership.

| | Name | Party | Term of service | Home county | Notes |
|---|---|---|---|---|---|
| 1 | John S. Gray | Republican | 1890–1891 | Ada | Served as the ex-officio 2nd lieutenant governor |
| 2 | Alexander E. Mayhew | Democratic | 1893–1894 | Shoshone | |
| 3 | Vic Bierbower | Republican | 1895–1896 | Logan | |
| 4 | Joseph C. Rich | Populist | 1897–1898 | Bear Lake | |
| 5 | Frank R. Gooding | Republican | 1899–1900 | Lincoln† | Served as the 7th governor and as U.S. senator |
| 6 | James W. Ballantine | Populist | 1901–1902 | Blaine | |
| 7 | John W. Brigham | Republican | 1903–1904 | Latah | |
| 8 | George E. Crum | Republican | 1905–1906 | Nez Perce | |
| 9 | C. H. Nugent | Republican | 1907–1908 | Idaho | |
| 10 | John W. Hart | Republican | 1909–1910 | Madison | |
| 11 | Fred W. Gooding | Republican | 1911–1912 | Lincoln | |
| 12 | John W. Hart | Republican | 1913–1916 | Madison | |
| 13 | Perry W. Mitchell | Democratic | 1917–1918 | Nez Perce | |
| 14 | E. W. Whitcomb | Republican | 1919–1922 | Lemhi | |
| 15 | Lorenzo R. Thomas | Republican | 1923–1924 | Bingham | |
| 16 | John McMurray | Republican | 1925–1930 | Cassia | |
| 17 | George W. Grebe | Republican | 1931–1932 | Ada | |
| 18 | E. G. Van Hoesen | Democratic | 1933–1934 | Adams | |
| 19 | Perry W. Mitchell | Democratic | 1935–1936 | Lewis | |
| 20 | James B. Newport | Democratic | 1937–1938 | Canyon | |
| 21 | Thomas Heath | Republican | 1939–1940 | Franklin | |
| 22 | Perry W. Mitchell | Democratic | 1941–1942 | Lewis | |
| 23 | C. A. Robins | Republican | 1943–1944 | Benewah | Served as the 22nd governor |
| 24 | J. E. Williams | Republican | 1945–1948 | Bingham | |
| 25 | O. E. Cannon | Democratic | 1949–1950 | Elmore | |
| 26 | E. J. Soelberg | Republican | 1951–1952 | Butte | |
| 27 | William C. Moore | Republican | – February 7, 1953 | Latah | Resigned from office |
| 28 | Carl Irwin | Republican | 1955–1956 | Twin Falls | |
| 29 | O. J. Buxton | Democratic | 1957–1960 | Teton | |
| 30 | A. W. Naegle | Republican | 1961–1962 | Bonneville | |
| 31 | Jack M. Murphy | Republican | 1963–1966 | Lincoln | Served as the 32nd lieutenant governor |
| 32 | R. H. Young | Republican | 1967–1978 | Canyon | Served previously as speaker of the House |
| 33 | James Ellsworth | Republican | 1969–1976 | Lemhi | |
| 34 | Phil Batt | Republican | 1976–1978 | Canyon | Served as the 35th lieutenant governor and the 29th governor |
| 35 | Reed Budge | Republican | 1978–1982 | Caribou | |
| 36 | Jim Risch | Republican | 1982–1988 | Ada | Served 39th and 41st lieutenant governor and as 31st governor; serves as U.S. senator |
| 37 | Mike Crapo | Republican | 1988–1992 | Bonneville | Currently serves as U.S. senator |
| 38 | Jerry Twiggs | Republican | 1992–2000 | Bingham | Died in office |
| 39 | Robert L. Geddes | Republican | 2000–2010 | Caribou | |
| 40 | Brent Hill | Republican | 2010–2020 | Madison | |
| 41 | Chuck Winder | Republican | 2020–2024 | Ada | |
| 42 | Kelly Anthon | Republican | 2024–present | Cassia | Incumbent |

† Frank R. Gooding was elected from and represented Lincoln County in the Idaho Senate although his residence was in present-day Gooding County, which was created in 1913 from Lincoln County, after his service as governor, and is his namesake.

== See also ==
- List of Idaho state legislatures
