= Idaho's 28th legislative district =

American legislative district

Idaho's 28th legislative district is one of 35 districts of the Idaho Legislature. It is currently represented by Jim Guthrie, Republican of McCammon, Representative Randy Armstrong, Republican of Inkom, and Representative Kelley Packer, Republican of McCammon.

== District profile ==
=== 2012–present ===
District 28 currently consists of all of Power and portion of Bannock County.

Legislature	Session	Senate	House Seat A	House Seat B
62nd (2012 - 2014)	1st	Jim Guthrie (R)	Ken Andrus (R)	Kelley Packer (R)
62nd (2012 - 2014)	2nd	Jim Guthrie (R)	Ken Andrus (R)	Kelley Packer (R)
63rd (2014 - 2016)	1st	Jim Guthrie (R)	Ken Andrus (R)	Kelley Packer (R)
63rd (2014 - 2016)	2nd	Jim Guthrie (R)	Ken Andrus (R)	Kelley Packer (R)
64th (2016 - 2018)	1st	Jim Guthrie (R)	Randall Armstrong (R)	Kelley Packer (R)
64th (2016 - 2018)	2nd	Jim Guthrie (R)	Randall Armstrong (R)	Kelley Packer (R)
65th (2018 - 2020)	1st	Jim Guthrie (R)	Randall Armstrong (R)	Kevin Andrus (R)
65th (2018 - 2020)	2nd	Jim Guthrie (R)	Randall Armstrong (R)	Kevin Andrus (R)
66th (2020 - 2022)	1st	Jim Guthrie (R)	Randall Armstrong (R)	Kevin Andrus (R)
66th (2020 - 2022)	2nd	Jim Guthrie (R)	Randall Armstrong (R)	Kevin Andrus (R)

=== 2002–2012 ===
From 2002 to 2012, District 28 consisted of part of Bingham County.

Legislature	Session	Senate	House Seat A	House Seat B
57th (2002 - 2004)	1st	Stan Williams (R)	Dennis Lake (R)	Joseph Cannon (R)
57th (2002 - 2004)	2nd	Stan Williams (R)	Dennis Lake (R)	Joseph Cannon (R)
58th (2004 - 2006)	1st	Stan Williams (R)	Dennis Lake (R)	Joseph Cannon (R)
58th (2004 - 2006)	2nd	Stan Williams (R)	Dennis Lake (R)	Joseph Cannon (R)
59th (2006 - 2008)	1st	Steve Bair (R)	Dennis Lake (R)	Jim Marriott (R)
59th (2006 - 2008)	2nd	Steve Bair (R)	Dennis Lake (R)	Jim Marriott (R)
60th (2008 - 2010)	1st	Steve Bair (R)	Dennis Lake (R)	Jim Marriott (R)
60th (2008 - 2010)	2nd	Steve Bair (R)	Dennis Lake (R)	Jim Marriott (R)
61st (2010 - 2012)	1st	Steve Bair (R)	Dennis Lake (R)	Jim Marriott (R)
61st (2010 - 2012)	2nd	Steve Bair (R)	Dennis Lake (R)	Jim Marriott (R)

=== 1992–2002 ===
From 1992 to 2002, District 28 consisted of all of Teton County and a portion of Bonneville and Fremont counties.

Legislature	Session	Senate	House Seat A	House Seat B
51st (1992 - 1994)	1st	Stan Hawkins (R)	Max Mortensen (R)	Lynn Loosli (R)
51st (1992 - 1994)	2nd	Stan Hawkins (R)	Max Mortensen (R)	Lynn Loosli (R)
52nd (1994 - 1996)	1st	Stan Hawkins (R)	Max Mortensen (R)	Lynn Loosli (R)
52nd (1994 - 1996)	2nd	Stan Hawkins (R)	Max Mortensen (R)	Lynn Loosli (R)
53rd (1996 - 1998)	1st	Stan Hawkins (R)	Max Mortensen (R)	Cameron Wheeler (R)
53rd (1996 - 1998)	2nd	Stan Hawkins (R)	Max Mortensen (R)	Cameron Wheeler (R)
54th (1998 - 2000)	1st	Stan Hawkins (R)	Max Mortensen (R)	Cameron Wheeler (R)
54th (1998 - 2000)	2nd	Stan Hawkins (R)	Max Mortensen (R)	Cameron Wheeler (R)
55th (2000 - 2002)	1st	Stan Hawkins (R)	Max Mortensen (R)	Cameron Wheeler (R)
55th (2000 - 2002)	2nd	Stan Hawkins (R)	Max Mortensen (R)	Cameron Wheeler (R)

== See also ==
- List of Idaho senators
- List of Idaho representatives
