= Jim Guthrie (politician) =

American politician from Idaho

Member of the Idaho Senate from District 28
- Incumbent
- Assumed office December 1, 2012
- Preceded by: Steve Bair (redistricting)

Member of the Idaho House of Representatives from District 29 Seat B
- In office December 1, 2010 – November 30, 2012
- Preceded by: James Ruchti
- Succeeded by: Elaine Smith

Personal details
- Born: July 13, 1955 (age 71) Pocatello, Idaho
- Party: Republican
- Spouse: Barbara (m. 1976; div. 2016)

Jim Guthrie (born July 13, 1955, in Pocatello, Idaho) is an American politician and a Republican member of the Idaho Senate. Since 2012, he has represented District 28, and previously served in the Idaho House of Representatives from 2010 to 2012 for District 29 Seat B.

== Early life and career ==
Guthrie graduated from Marsh Valley High School. He was a Bannock County Commissioner from 2001 until 2007. In 2016, an extramarital affair between Guthrie and Idaho Representative Christy Perry was brought to light by a political activist after an interview with Guthrie's former wife.

== Idaho Senate ==
Guthrie was first elected to the Senate in 2012. In 2026, he was the only Republican in the Senate to vote against a bathroom bill introduced by Ben Toews that would make it illegal for transgender individuals to use the public facilities that correspond with their gender identity, saying that the bill would leave transgender men with masculine features unable to use the bathrooms corresponding to either gender.

=== Elections ===
Idaho Senate District 28

2018 Guthrie defeated Alan B. Curtis with 63.3% of the vote to win the Republican primary. In the general election, he defeated Democrat Mike Saville with 61.9% of the vote.

2016 Guthrie was unopposed in the Republican primary.

Guthrie defeated Mike Saville in the general election with 61.6% of the vote.

2014 Guthrie was unopposed in the Republican primary and general election.

2012 Redistricted to District 28, Guthrie chose to run for its open senate seat.

He won the Republican primary with 65.3% of the vote against W. Rusty Barlow.

Guthrie defeated Democratic nominee Dave Finkelnburg in the general election with 66.1% of the vote to succeed Republican Senator Steve Bair, who was redistricted to District 31.

2006 When Democratic Senator Bert Marley left the District 29 seat open for a run as Superintendent of Public Instruction.

Guthrie ran unopposed in the Republican primary.

Guthrie lost the general election by 370 votes to Democrat Diane Bilyeu.

Idaho House of Representatives District 29 Seat B

2010 With Democratic Representative James D. Ruchti vacating the District 29 B seat, Guthrie ran unopposed in the Republican primary.

Guthrie won general election with 59.8% of the vote against Greg Anderson.
