= Ben Adams (Idaho politician) =

American politician

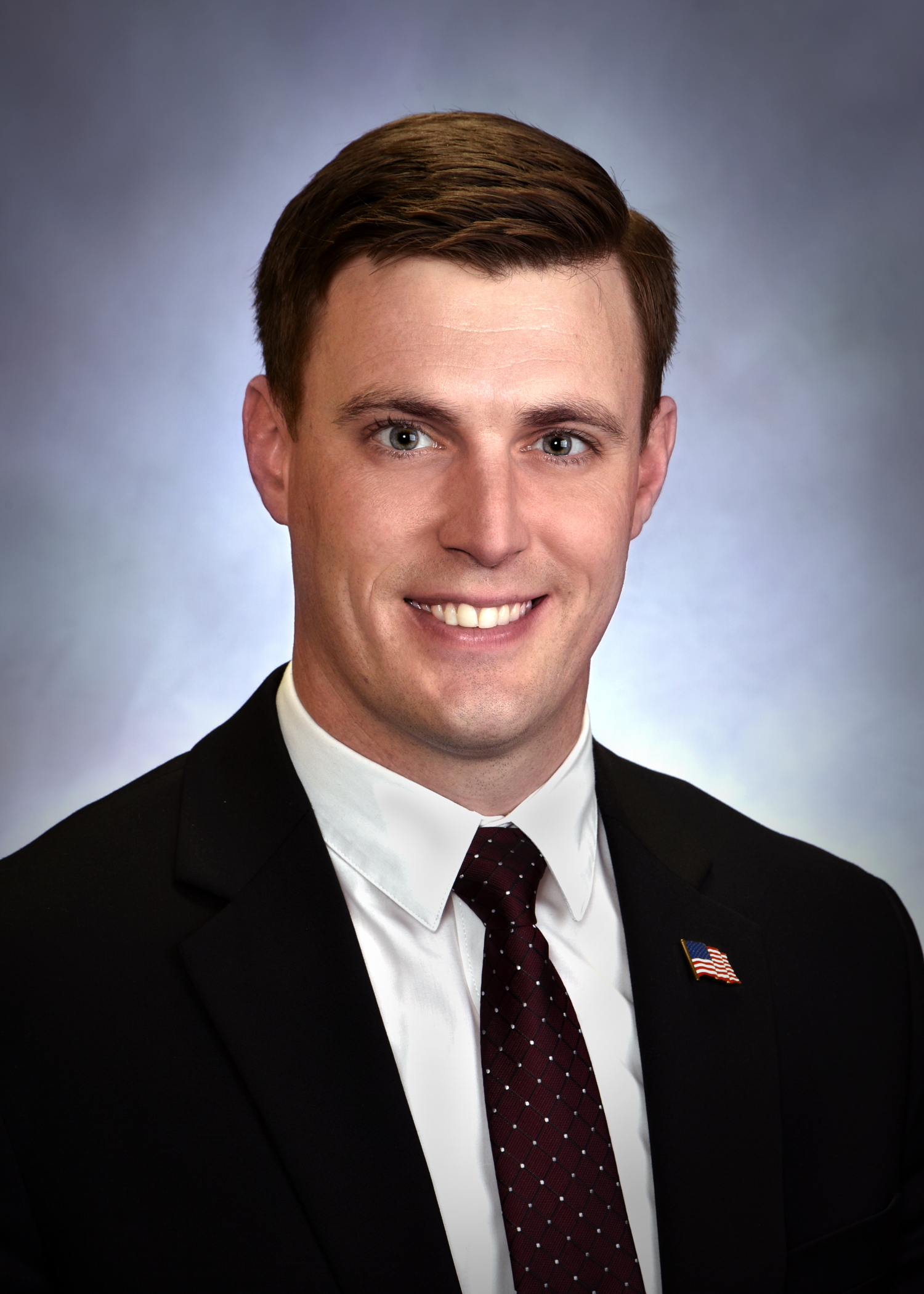
- Representative Ben Adams in 2021

Member of the Idaho Senate from the 12th district
- Incumbent
- Assumed office December 1, 2022
- Preceded by: Todd Lakey

Personal details
- Born: Jupiter, Florida, U.S.
- Party: Republican
- Spouse: Rebecca
- Children: 2
- Education: Boise State University

Military service
- Branch/service: United States Marine Corps
- Battles/wars: War in Afghanistan

Ben Adams is an American politician who serves as a member of the Idaho State Senate from the 12th district. First elected in November 2020 to the Idaho House of Representatives, he assumed office on December 1, 2020. He was then elected in November 2022 to the Idaho State Senate and re-elected in November of 2024.

== Early life and education ==
Adams was born in Jupiter, Florida. The son of a pastor, Adams lived in Kyiv with his family before relocating to Emmett, Idaho. He studied political science and government at Boise State University.

== Career ==
Adams served in the United States Marine Corps, reaching the rank of sergeant. During his career, Adams was twice deployed to Afghanistan. Since retiring from the military, Adams has worked as a football coach at Nampa High School and project manager for a water damage restoration company. He was elected to the Idaho House of Representatives in November 2020 and assumed office on December 1, 2020. He was elected to the Idaho State Senate in November of 2022 and re-elected in November of 2024. In 2024, he filed the Defend the Guard act stating that Congress must authorize the president's use of military force via a formal declaration of war and doing otherwise is an "abdication of congressional authority that highlights the necessity of this legislation.”
