= Josh Keyser =

American politician (born 1986-1987)

Member of the Idaho Senate from the 20th district
- Incumbent
- Assumed office December 1, 2024
- Preceded by: Chuck Winder

Personal details
- Born: 1986 or 1987 (age 39–40)
- Party: Republican
- Spouse: Michelle Keyser
- Children: 3
- Education: Vanguard University (B.A.)
- Website: joshkeyser4idaho.com

Josh Keyser (born 1986-1987) is an American politician and businessman who is currently serving as a Republican member of the Idaho Senate, representing the 20th district. He was first elected in 2024, defeating Republican incumbent and former Senate Leader Chuck Winder with 52% of the vote in the Republican primary.

== Personal life and career ==
Keyser formerly served as a Marine and trained for the Boise Police Department. He graduated with a Bachelor of Arts degree in Business from Vanguard University. He moved to Meridian from California in 2018.

== Political views ==
=== Homelessness ===
Keyser was a co-sponsor of two bills in March 2025 which banned homeless encampments, such as tents, from being placed on public property, including cars and sidewalks.

=== Welfare ===
Keyser co-sponsored House Bill 199 in March 2025, which lowers the cap of maximum income for refugees in Idaho for federal medical aid.
