= Brandon Shippy =

American politician

Member of the Idaho Senate from the 9th district
- Incumbent
- Assumed office July 18, 2024
- Preceded by: Abby Lee

Personal details
- Party: Republican
- Spouse: Rakel Shippy
- Children: 3
- Website: www.shippyforidaho.com

Brandon Shippy is an American politician and businessman who is currently serving as a Republican member of the Idaho Senate, representing the 9th district. He was appointed by Governor Brad Little to represent the seat on July 18, 2024, after incumbent Abby Lee resigned.

== Personal life and career ==
Shippy was raised in New Plymouth and Fruitland. He is married and has three children. He owns a sprinkler company in New Plymouth.

== Political views ==
=== Abortion ===
Shippy proposed the Idaho Prenatal Equal Protection Act in February 2025 to further criminalize abortion and charge mothers who seek abortions with homicide, except in cases to protect the life of the mother. The bill would remove exemptions from the law regarding rape and incest.

=== Marijuana ===
Shippy supported a bill in February 2025 that added a $300 fine to any charge of misdemeanor marijuana possession.

=== Vaccines ===
Shippy proposed Senate Bill 1036, which would have banned gene therapy and mRNA vaccines until July 2035.
