= Dan Foreman =

American politician from Idaho

Member of the Idaho Senate from the 6th district
- Incumbent
- Assumed office December 1, 2022
- Preceded by: David Nelson

Member of the Idaho Senate from the 5th district
- In office December 1, 2016 – November 30, 2018
- Preceded by: Dan Schmidt
- Succeeded by: David Nelson

Personal details
- Born: September 20, 1953 (age 72) Lake Forest, Illinois, U.S.
- Party: Republican
- Spouse: Maria
- Children: 7
- Education: Bradley University (BS)

Military service
- Branch/service: United States Air Force
- Rank: Colonel

Daniel David Foreman III (born September 20, 1953) is an American politician who has served in the Idaho Senate since 2022, representing the 6th district. He previously served from 2016 to 2018 and represented the 5th district, which covers parts of Benewah and Latah counties.

== Early life and education ==
Foreman was born in Lake Forest, Illinois to Daniel David Foreman Jr and Eileen Susan (McKeating) Foreman. He earned a Bachelor of Science degree in business management and administration from Bradley University in 1975.

== Career ==
He served in the United States Air Force for 30 years and retired as a colonel. He later served as a police officer with the Moscow, Idaho Police Department. Foreman was elected to the Idaho Senate in 2016, narrowly defeating incumbent Democratic Senator Dan Schmidt.

Foreman introduced several bills to the legislature during his first weeks in office, including one that would "classify abortion as first-degree murder — for the mother, as well as the doctor who performs the operation — except in cases where the mother’s life is endangered." He also introduced a bill that would reduce Idaho's sales tax from 6% to 5%, as well as two other tax bills.

Foreman was defeated in the November 2018 elections, losing to Democrat David Nelson, receiving 8,777 votes to Nelson's 11,197 votes.

He defeated Nelson in the 2022 election.

== Political views ==
Foreman has been a vocal critic of his own district, calling the area a "cesspool of liberalism". Foreman denies climate change, referring to it as a "scam". He does not support the separation of church and state.

Foreman claimed to be the victim of an online identity-theft hoax when on February 20, 2018, State Senator Maryanne Jordan confirmed she had filed an ethics complaint against Foreman after an unverified Twitter account claiming to be owned by Foreman indicated that a group of students should discuss "killing babies" with her. Foreman reportedly had been scheduled to meet with college students from the University of Idaho who were advocating for birth control and sex education. After cancelling the meeting at the last minute, Foreman was recorded yelling at the students as he passed them in the hallway, telling them, "abortion is murder".

== Controversies ==
On October 1, 2024, among the seated candidates at a "meet the candidates" forum in Kendrick, Foreman reportedly stood up and interrupted Trish Carter-Goodheart, a Native American woman born in Idaho and running for the state legislature, who was responding in her turn to a question from the audience regarding discrimination. Including profanities, he shouted at her "go back where you came from" and denied that racism existed in Idaho before angrily leaving the forum that continued without him. He later wrote on Facebook, "I enlightened this person to the fact I was born in America, and I am therefore a native American. There was no racial slur in my statement". Several attending the forum confirmed the report of the incident, including Foreman’s opponent who stated that she rose, confronted Foreman, and attempted to defuse his anger before he stormed out.

== Personal life ==
Foreman and his wife, Maria, have 7 children and 20 grandchildren. Foreman is Catholic.

== Electoral history ==
2016

Latah County Sheriff Republican primary election, 2016
Party	Candidate	Votes	%
Republican	Richard (Richie) Skiles	1,343	52.70
Republican	Dan Foreman	969	38.02
Republican	Brian Strampher	236	9.26
Total votes		2,548	100.00

Idaho Senate District 5 election, 2016
Party	Candidate	Votes	%
Republican	Dan Foreman	11,275	50.76
Democratic	Dan Schmidt	10,939	49.24
Total votes		22,214	100.00

2018

Idaho Senate District 5, Republican primary election, 2018
Party	Candidate	Votes	%
Republican	Dan Foreman	2,180	51.3
Republican	Marshall Comstock	2,071	48.7
Total votes		4,251	100.0

Idaho Senate District 5 election, 2018
Party	Candidate	Votes	%
Democratic	David Nelson	11,197	56.1
Republican	Dan Foreman (incumbent)	8,777	43.9
Total votes		19,974	100.0

2020

Idaho Senate District 5 Republican primary election, 2020
Party	Candidate	Votes	%
Republican	Dan Foreman	4,376	100.0
Total votes		4,376	100.0

Idaho Senate District 5 election, 2020
Party	Candidate	Votes	%
Democratic	David Nelson (incumbent)	12,691	50.4
Republican	Dan Foreman	12,471	49.6
Total votes		25,162	100.0

2022

Idaho Senate District 6, Republican primary election, 2022
Party	Candidate	Votes	%
Republican	Dan Foreman	2,792	43.2
Republican	Robert Blair	2,282	35.3
Republican	Jen Seegmiller	1,391	21.5
Total votes		6,465	100.0

Idaho Senate District 6 election, 2022
Party	Candidate	Votes	%
Republican	Dan Foreman	10,174	50.1
Democratic	David Nelson (incumbent)	9,746	48.0
Constitution	James Hartley	398	2.0
Total votes		20,318	100.0

2024

Idaho Senate District 6, Republican primary election, 2024
Party	Candidate	Votes	%
Republican	Dan Foreman	3,396	53.2
Republican	Robert Blair	2,983	46.8
Total votes		6,379	100.0
