= Ben Toews =

American politician

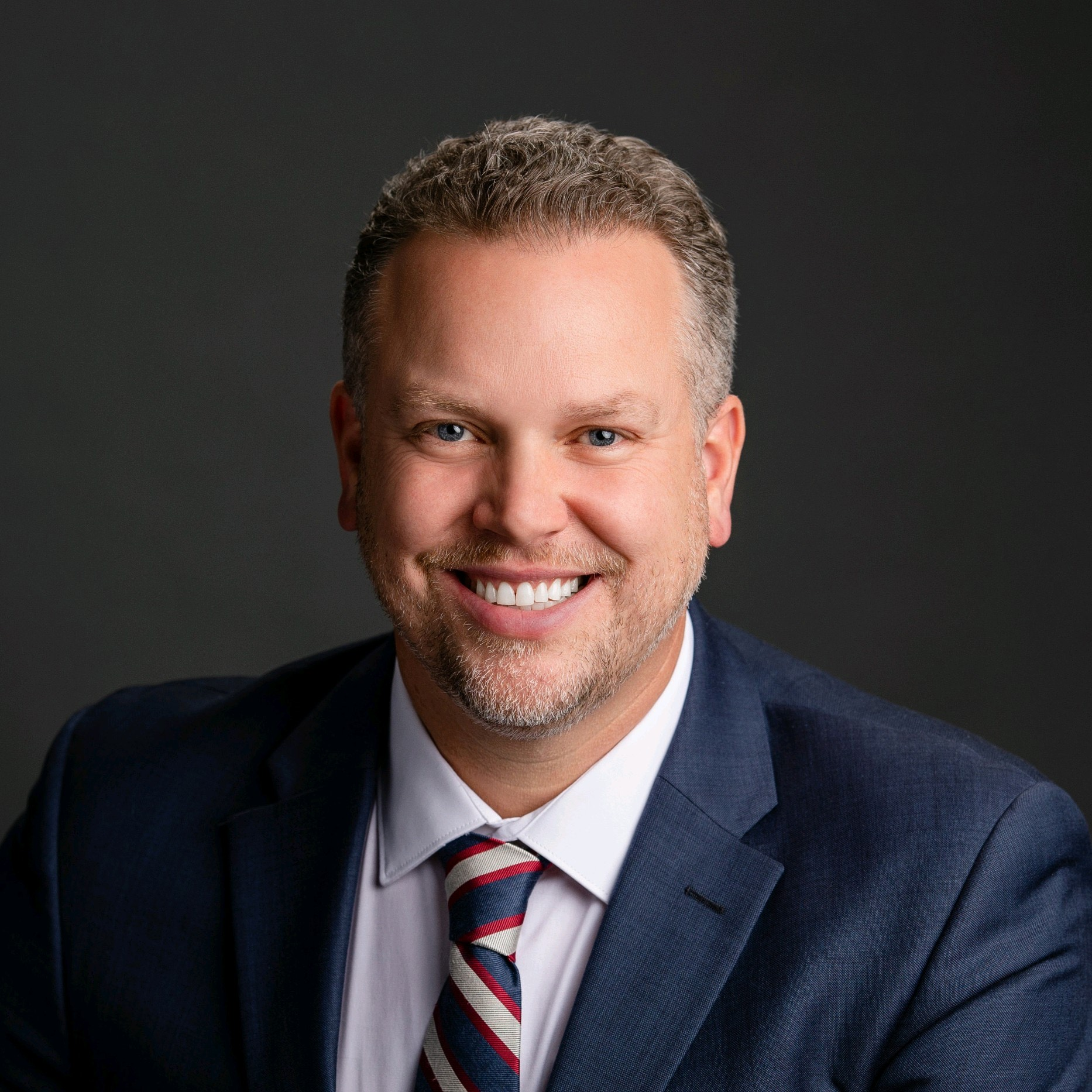

Member of the Idaho Senate from the 4th district
- Incumbent
- Assumed office December 1, 2022
- Preceded by: Mary Souza

Personal details
- Party: Republican
- Children: 5
- Education: North Idaho College (AA); Gonzaga University (BBA)

Benjamin Toews is an American politician serving as a member of the Idaho Senate for the 4th district. He assumed office on December 1, 2022. Before becoming a senator, he worked at Bullet Tools, a tool manufacturing company he co-owned with his in-laws.

== Education ==
Toews earned an associate degree from North Idaho College and a Bachelor of Business Administration from Gonzaga University.

== Career ==
For 17 years, Toews worked for Bullet Tools, a tool manufacturing company he helped launch and co-owned with his in-laws. The company was acquired by the Marshalltown Company in 2019. Toews was elected to the Idaho Senate in November 2022.

In 2026, Toews sponsored a bill in the Idaho Senate to prohibit transgender individuals from using the bathrooms for the gender with which they identify. The bathroom bill received criticism for being difficult to enforce, and Toews was accused of legislating against the existence of trans people, but he defended the bill, saying that it was primarily targeted towards sexual predators.
