= Lori Den Hartog =

American politician

Majority Leader of the Idaho Senate
- Incumbent
- Assumed office December 5, 2024
- Preceded by: Kelly Anthon

Member of the Idaho Senate from the 22nd district
- Incumbent
- Assumed office December 1, 2014
- Preceded by: Russ Fulcher

Personal details
- Born: Lori Vander Woude; 1980 (age 45–46) Escondido, California, U.S.
- Party: Republican
- Spouse: Scott
- Children: 3
- Relatives: John Vander Woude (father)
- Education: Dordt University (BA)
- Website: Campaign website

Lori Den Hartog (née Vander Woude, born 1980) is an American politician serving as a member of the Idaho Senate from the 22nd district. She assumed office on December 1, 2014.

== Early life and education ==
Den Hartog was born in Escondido, California and graduated from Nampa Christian High School. She earned a Bachelor of Arts degree in business administration and public administration from Dordt College.

== Career ==
Outside of politics, Den Hartog has worked in land use, transportation planning, and grant administration. She was elected to the Idaho Senate in November 2014 and assumed office on December 1, 2014. From 2017 to 2020, Den Hartog served as vice chair of the Senate Agricultural Affairs Committee. In the 2021–2022 legislative session, she is chair of the Senate Transportation Committee.

== Personal life ==
Den Hartog and her husband, Scott, were married in 2002. They have three children.

Den Hartog's father, John Vander Woude, also a Republican, is a member of the Idaho House of Representatives. This marked the first time a father and daughter have served together in the Idaho legislature.

Idaho Senate
Preceded by Kelly Anthon	Majority Leader of the Idaho Senate; 2024–present	Incumbent
