= C. Scott Grow =

American politician from Idaho

First Quorum of the Seventy
- April 2, 2005 – October 6, 2018
- Called by: Gordon B. Hinckley
- End reason: Designated emeritus General Authority

Emeritus General Authority
- October 6, 2018
- Called by: Russell M. Nelson

Member of the Idaho Senate from District 14

In office
- August 15, 2018
- Predecessor: Marv Hagedorn
- Political party: Republican

Personal details
- Born: May 5, 1948 (age 78); Moscow, Idaho, United States
- Residence: Eagle, Idaho

Cecil Scott Grow (born May 5, 1948) is an American politician and religious leader and has been the State Senator for Idaho's District 14 since his appointment in August 2018. Grow has been a general authority of the Church of Jesus Christ of Latter-day Saints (LDS Church) since 2005.

== Early life, education, and career ==
Grow was born in Moscow, Idaho, and grew up in Boise, Idaho. As a young man, he was a missionary in the LDS Church's Southeast Mexican Mission. After his mission, Grow received a bachelor's degree in accounting from Brigham Young University. He then worked for several accounting firms before founding his own accounting partnership.

== LDS Church service ==
Grow has served in the LDS Church as a counselor in a stake presidency, stake president and regional representative. From 1988 to 1991, he was president of the church's Uruguay Montevideo Mission. As an area seventy from 1995 to 2005 he was in the presidency of both the church's North America Northwest and Idaho areas. During this time, he was president of the Idaho Area from 2001 to 2003, one of only four non-general authorities to have served as an area president (the others being Enrique R. Falabella, during the same time period, Aleksey Samaykin, in 2022-2025, and Aleksandr Drachyov, beginning 2025).

In 2005, Grow became a member of the First Quorum of the Seventy where he has served as a counselor and as president of the Mexico North Area, as well as a counselor in the Mexico Area. Grow also served as a counselor in the presidency of the South America Northwest Area. In 2016, Grow participated with Dieter F. Uchtdorf in a ceremonial cornerstone sealing at the new Fort Collins Colorado Temple.

On October 6, 2018, Grow was designated an emeritus general authority.

== Idaho Senate ==
Grow serves on the following Senate committees: Finance, and Local Government and Taxation.

== Elections ==
=== 2018 ===
In February 2018, Grow announced his candidacy to run for the senate seat in Idaho Legislative District 14 after the incumbent, Marv Hagedorn, announced he was seeking the Republican nomination for lieutenant governor, instead of running for reelection.

Hagedorn resigned before the end of his term after Governor Butch Otter appointed him to serve in his administration. In August 2018, the Legislative District 14 Republican Central Committee sent three names in order of preference to Otter to fill the vacancy, with Grow as their first recommendation. On August 15, 2018, Otter appointed Grow to serve the remainder of Hagedorn's term.

Grow defeated Ted Hill, Todd Hatfield, Darin J. Driscoll, Natalie Feuerstein, and write in Julie Looney with 35.2% of the vote in the Republican primary.

Grow defeated Democratic nominee Richard Boozel with 69.6% of the vote in the general election.

=== 2020 ===
Grow defeated Ted Hill again in the Republican primary with 52.65% of the vote. Grow defeated Ellen B. Spencer an Independent candidate but affiliated with Democratic party with 73% of the vote in the general election.

=== Later elections ===
In 2022 Grow received 81.2% of the vote against two third party candidates. In 2024 Grow received 84.9% of the vote against a third party candidate.

== Personal life ==
Grow is married to Rhonda Lee Patten and they are the parents of eight children. In 2012, Grow helped plan a large-scale reunion of more than 3,000 descendants of noted Salt Lake Valley architect Henry Grow, best known for designing and constructing the roof of the Salt Lake City Tabernacle on Temple Square.

== See also ==
- Deseret Morning News 2008 Church Almanac (Salt Lake City, Utah: Deseret Morning News, 2007) p. 45
- Idaho Secretary of State Candidate List (last updated 2/6/2018)
