= Todd Lakey =

American politician from Idaho

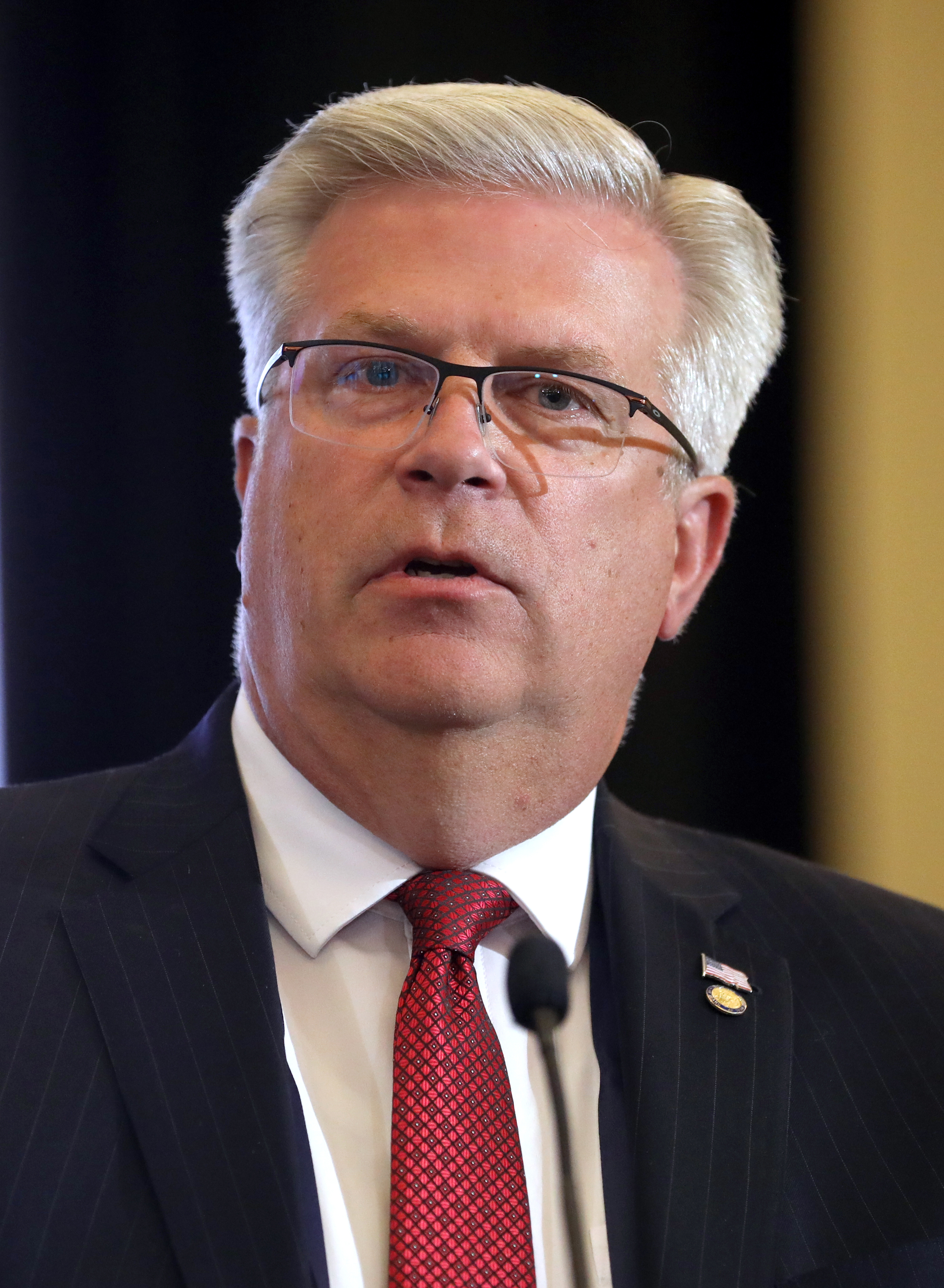

Member of the Idaho Senate
- Incumbent
- Assumed office December 1, 2012
- Preceded by: Curt McKenzie (redistricting)
- Constituency: 12th district (2012–2022); 23rd district (2022–present)

Personal details
- Born: Portland, Oregon, U.S.
- Party: Republican
- Spouse: Jan
- Children: 5
- Education: Brigham Young University (BS); Lewis & Clark College (JD)
- Website: lakeyforsenate.com

Military service
- Branch/service: United States Army
- Rank: Major
- Unit: United States Army Reserve

Todd M. Lakey is an American attorney and politician. A Republican, he has represented district 12 in the Idaho Senate since 2012. He currently serves as chair of the Senate Judiciary and Rules Committee. He now represents district 23.

== Early life and education ==
Lakey was born in Portland, Oregon. He earned a Bachelor of Science degree in international business from Brigham Young University and a Juris Doctor from Lewis & Clark Law School.

== Career ==
When Idaho Attorney General Alan G. Lance Sr. announced he would not run again, Lakey was one of four Republicans who ran in the May 28, 2002 primary election; he came in 3rd with 29,154 votes (23.5%), losing to Lawrence Wasden, who won the general election.

As a member of the Idaho Senate, Lakey was one of several main sponsors of SB 1385, a trigger law that would criminalize most abortions if Roe v. Wade was overturned. The bill was passed in March 2020.

== Elections ==
District 12 Senate - Part of Canyon County
Year	Candidate	Votes	Pct	Candidate	Votes	Pct
2012 primary	Todd Lakey	1,975	61.4%	Robert Schaefer	1,242	38.6%
2012 general	Todd Lakey	9,976	67.7%	Melissa Sue Robinson	4,752	32.3%
2014 primary	Todd Lakey (incumbent)	2,269	71.2%	Lee Rice	920	28.8%
2014 general	Todd Lakey (incumbent)	6,615	68.6%	Heidi Knittel	3,021	31.4%
2016 primary	Todd Lakey (incumbent)	1,917	100.0%			
2016 general	Todd Lakey (incumbent)	11,672	72.6%	Chelle Gluch	4,412	27.4%
2018 primary	Todd Lakey (incumbent)	3,699	100.0%			
2018 general	Todd Lakey (incumbent)	9,089	65.1%	Chelle Gluch	4,875	34.9%
