= Kelly Anthon =

American politician (born 1974)

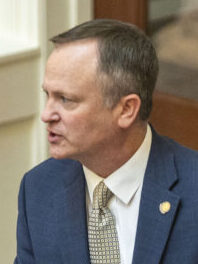
- Anthon on the Senate Floor in 2025

42nd President pro tempore of the Idaho Senate
- Incumbent
- Assumed office December 5, 2024
- Preceded by: Chuck Winder

Majority Leader of the Idaho Senate
- In office December 1, 2020 – November 30, 2024
- Preceded by: Chuck Winder
- Succeeded by: Lori Den Hartog

Member of the Idaho Senate
- Incumbent
- Assumed office July 2, 2015
- Preceded by: Dean Cameron
- Constituency: 27th district

Personal details
- Born: August 4, 1974 (age 51) Burley, Idaho, U.S.
- Party: Republican
- Spouse: Joelle
- Children: 5
- Education: Brigham Young University (BA); University of Idaho (JD)
- Website: Campaign website

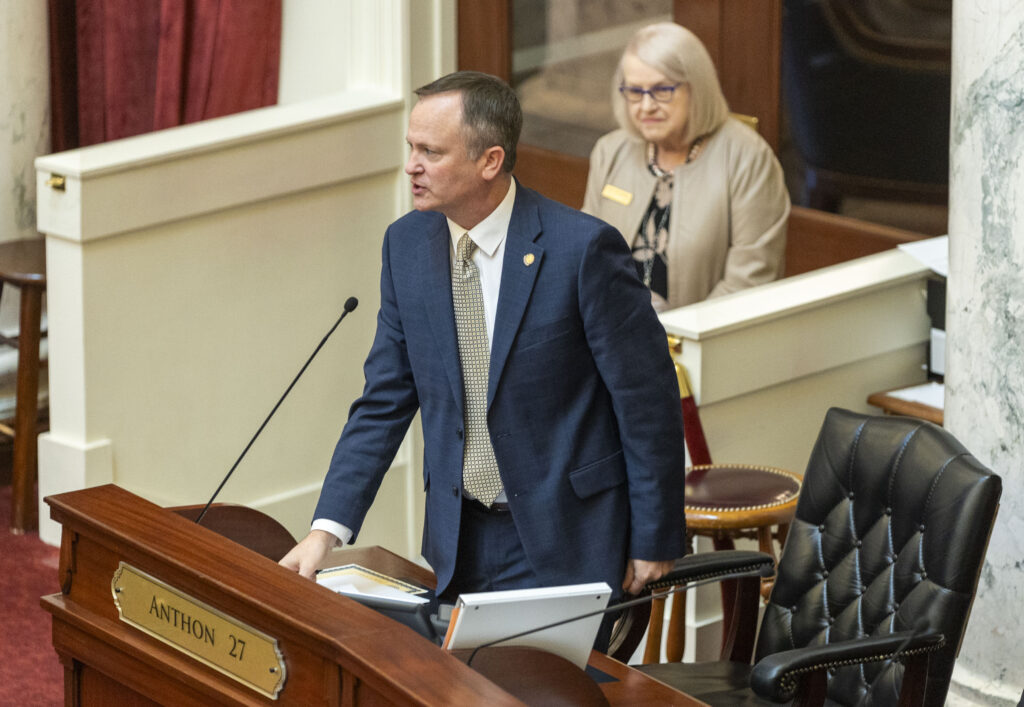
Anthon on the floor of the Idaho Senate in January 2025.

Kelly Arthur Anthon (born August 4, 1974) is a Republican Idaho State Senator since 2015 representing District 27.

== Early life and education ==
Anthon was born in Burley, Idaho. He was raised on a family farm near Declo, Idaho, attending public schools in Declo and graduating from Declo High School in 1992. He served as a missionary for the Church of Jesus Christ of Latter-day Saints in Japan, and later graduated from Brigham Young University with a Bachelor of Arts in anthropology in 1998 and from the University of Idaho College of Law in 2002 where he was also named the Bistline Scholar and student body president. In 2017, Anthon completed training as a professional civil mediator at Pepperdine University.

== Career ==
Upon passing the Idaho bar exam, he worked as an attorney in private practice in Idaho's Mini-Cassia Area. In 2003 he was appointed city attorney for Rupert, Minidoka, and Acequia cities. He also served as the City Attorney and Prosecutor for the City of Burley. At the time of his first appointment, he was the youngest city attorney in Idaho. In 2012, Anthon was hired as Rupert City Administrator where he has managed multiple public utilities. In 2013, Anthon was named one of the 40 most accomplished and influential professionals in Idaho under the age of 40. Anthon also serves on the corporate board of directors of the Mart Group—a potato processing and marketing company. In 2020, Anthon began teaching part time at the University of Idaho College of Law.

Proficient in Japanese, Anthon spent twenty years working as a contract consultant and international business and guest services specialist. His connections with Japan naturally led to him being a main point of contact between the Japanese government and the State of Idaho. In particular, Anthon has worked throughout his career with Japanese companies seeking to invest in Idaho, while also helping to open new markets in Japan for Idaho products. In 2025, Anthon received a prestigious commendation from the Japanese Government’s Ministry of Foreign Affairs in recognition of his decades of work strengthening cultural and economic ties between Idaho and Japan.

== Idaho Senate ==
When incumbent Senator Dean Cameron resigned his seat for an appointment as the director of the Department of Insurance, the Legislative District 27 Republican Central Committee sent three names in order of preference to Governor Butch Otter: Anthon, Doug Pickett of Oakley, and Wayne Hurst of Declo. Otter appointed Anthon to serve the remainder of Cameron's term. Anthon was subsequently elected in 2016 and reelected in 2018, 2020, 2022 and 2024.

== Senate Leadership ==
After his first year in the Idaho Senate, Anthon was recognized as one of the 'Emerging Leaders' in the nation's state legislatures by The State Legislative Leaders Foundation. Idaho Senate Republicans elected Anthon in 2017 as the Majority Caucus Chairman—one of four Republican leadership positions in the Idaho State Senate. In 2020, Anthon was elected as the Idaho Senate Majority Leader. He was re-elected Majority Leader in 2022. In 2024, Anthon was elected to the Idaho Senate's top role of President Pro Tempore, making him second in line of succession to the Governor.

=== Committee assignments ===
- State Affairs Committee
- Local Government & Taxation Committee

Anthon previously served on the Education Committee in 2016; he served on the Commerce Committee and the Health and Welfare Committees in 2017; he also served on the Judiciary and Rules Committee from 2015 through 2024.

== Elections ==
District 27 Senate - Cassia and Minidoka Counties.
Year	Candidate	Votes	Pct
2016 Primary	Kelly Anthon (incumbent)	4,679	100%
2016 General	Kelly Anthon (incumbent)	13,259	100%

== Personal life ==
Anthon and his wife Joelle (née Rogers) have 5 children. They reside in Declo, Idaho.

Idaho Senate
Preceded by Chuck Winder	Majority Leader of the Idaho Senate; 2020–2024	Succeeded by Lori Den Hartog
Preceded by Chuck Winder	President pro tempore of the Idaho Senate; 2024–present	Incumbent
