= Idaho Senate =

Upper state chamber of a state of the United-States of America

Coordinates: 43°37′04″N 116°11′59″W

Idaho State Senate
- Idaho Legislature

Type
- Type: Upper house
- Term limits: None

History
- New session started: January 12, 2026

Leadership
- President: Scott Bedke (R) since January 2, 2023
- President pro tempore: Kelly Anthon (R) since December 5, 2024
- Majority Leader: Lori Den Hartog (R) since December 5, 2024
- Minority Leader: Melissa Wintrow (D) since December 1, 2022

Structure
- Seats: 35
- Political groups: Majority: Republican (29); Minority: Democratic (6)
- Length of term: 2 years
- Authority: Article IV, Idaho Constitution
- Salary: $16,684/year + per diem

Elections
- Last election: November 5, 2024 (35 seats)
- Next election: November 3, 2026 (35 seats)
- Redistricting: Idaho Redistricting Commission

Meeting place
- State Senate Chamber; Idaho State Capitol; Boise, Idaho

Website
- Idaho Senate

Rules
- Senate Rules

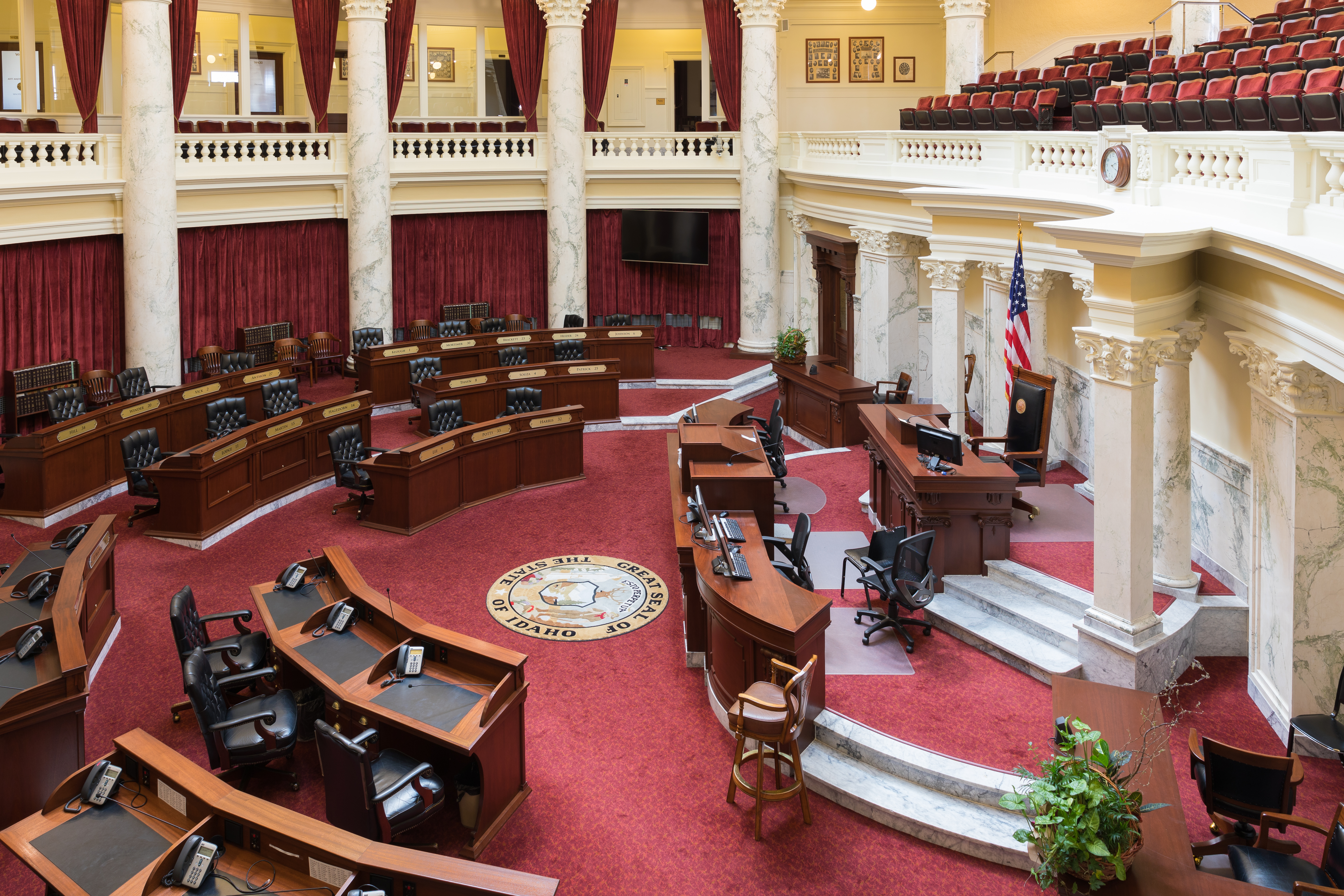
State Senate Chamber at the Idaho State Capitol in Boise

The Idaho State Senate is the upper chamber of the Idaho Legislature. It consists of 35 senators elected to two-year terms, each representing a district of the state. The Senate meets at the Idaho State Capitol in Boise, Idaho.

== Composition of the Senate ==
Since 1992, the Republican Party has won more than half of the seats of the state Senate.

Affiliation	Party (Shading indicates majority caucus)		Total
Affiliation	Republican	Democratic	Total
52nd Legislature (1992–1994)	23	12	35
53rd Legislature (1994–1996)	27	8	35
54th Legislature (1996–1998)	30	5	35
55th Legislature (1998–2000)	31	4	35
56th Legislature (2000–2002)	32	3	35
57th through 63rd Legislature (2002–2016)	28	7	35
64th Legislature (2016–2018)	29	6	35
65th through 67th Legislature (2018–2024)	28	7	35
68th Legislature (2024-)	29	6	35
Current Voting Share	82.9%	17.1%	

=== Leadership of the 68th Legislature ===
Position	Name	Party	District
President/Lieutenant Governor of Idaho	Scott Bedke	Republican	–
President Pro Tempore	Kelly Anthon	Republican	27
Majority Leader	Lori Den Hartog	Republican	21
Assistant Majority Leader	Mark Harris	Republican	35
Majority Caucus Chair	Ben Toews	Republican	4
Minority Leader	Melissa Wintrow	Democratic	19
Assistant Minority Leader	James Ruchti	Democratic	29
Minority Caucus Chair	Janie Ward-Engelking	Democratic	18

=== Committee chairs of the 68th Legislature ===
Committee	Chairman	Party	District
Agriculture Affairs	Tammy Nichols	Republican	
Commerce and Human Resources	Daniel D. Foreman	Republican	
Education	Dave Lent	Republican	
Finance	C. Scott Grow	Republican	
Health and Welfare	Julie VanOrden	Republican	
Judiciary and Rules	Todd M. Lakey	Republican	
Local Government and Taxation	Doug Ricks	Republican	
Resources and Environment	Van T. Burtenshaw	Republican	
State Affairs	Jim Guthrie	Republican	
Transportation	Doug Okuniewicz	Republican	

=== Members of the Idaho Senate ===
District	Name	Party	Residence	Counties	Start
1	Jim Woodward	Republican	Sagle	Bonner, Boundary	2024
2	Phil Hart	Republican	Kellogg	Benewah, Bonner, Clearwater, Kootenai, Shoshone	2022
3	Doug Okuniewicz	Republican	Hayden	Kootenai	2022
4	Ben Toews	Republican	Coeur d'Alene	Kootenai	2022
5	Carl Bjerke	Republican	Coeur d'Alene	Kootenai	2022
6	Dan Foreman	Republican	Viola	Latah, Lewis, Nez Perce	2022
7	Cindy Carlson	Republican	Riggins	Adams, Idaho, Nez Perce	2022
8	Christy Zito	Republican	Hammett	Boise, Custer, Elmore, Valley	2024
9	Brandon Shippy	Republican	New Plymouth	Canyon, Payette, Washington	2024
10	Tammy Nichols	Republican	Middleton	Ada, Canyon	2022
11	Camille Blaylock	Republican	Caldwell	Canyon	2024
12	Ben Adams	Republican	Nampa	Canyon	2022
13	Brian Lenney	Republican	Nampa	Canyon	2022
14	C. Scott Grow	Republican	Eagle	Ada, Gem	2018
15	Codi Galloway	Republican	Boise	Ada	2024
16	Alison Rabe	Democratic	Boise	Ada	2022
17	Carrie Semmelroth	Democratic	Boise	Ada	2021
18	Janie Ward-Engelking	Democratic	Boise	Ada	2013
19	Melissa Wintrow	Democratic	Boise	Ada	2020
20	Josh Keyser	Republican	Boise	Ada	2024
21	Treg Bernt	Republican	Meridian	Ada	2022
22	Lori Den Hartog	Republican	Meridian	Ada	2014
23	Todd Lakey	Republican	Nampa	Ada, Canyon, Owyhee	2012
24	Glenneda Zuiderveld	Republican	Twin Falls	Camas, Gooding, Twin Falls	2022
25	Josh Kohl	Republican	Twin Falls	Twin Falls	2024
26	Ron Taylor	Democratic	Hailey	Blaine, Jerome, Lincoln	2022
27	Kelly Anthon	Republican	Declo	Cassia, Minidoka, Oneida	2015
28	Jim Guthrie	Republican	McCammon	Bannock, Franklin, Power	2012
29	James Ruchti	Democratic	Pocatello	Bannock	2022
30	Julie VanOrden	Republican	Pingree	Bingham, Butte	2022
31	Van Burtenshaw	Republican	Terreton	Clark, Fremont, Jefferson, Lemhi	2018
32	Kevin Cook	Republican	Idaho Falls	Bonneville	2020
33	Dave Lent	Republican	Idaho Falls	Bonneville	2018
34	Doug Ricks	Republican	Rexburg	Madison	2020
35	Mark Harris	Republican	Soda Springs	Bannock, Bear Lake, Bonneville, Caribou, Teton	2015

== See also ==
- Idaho House of Representatives
