= 2023 Boise mayoral election =

- November 7, 2023
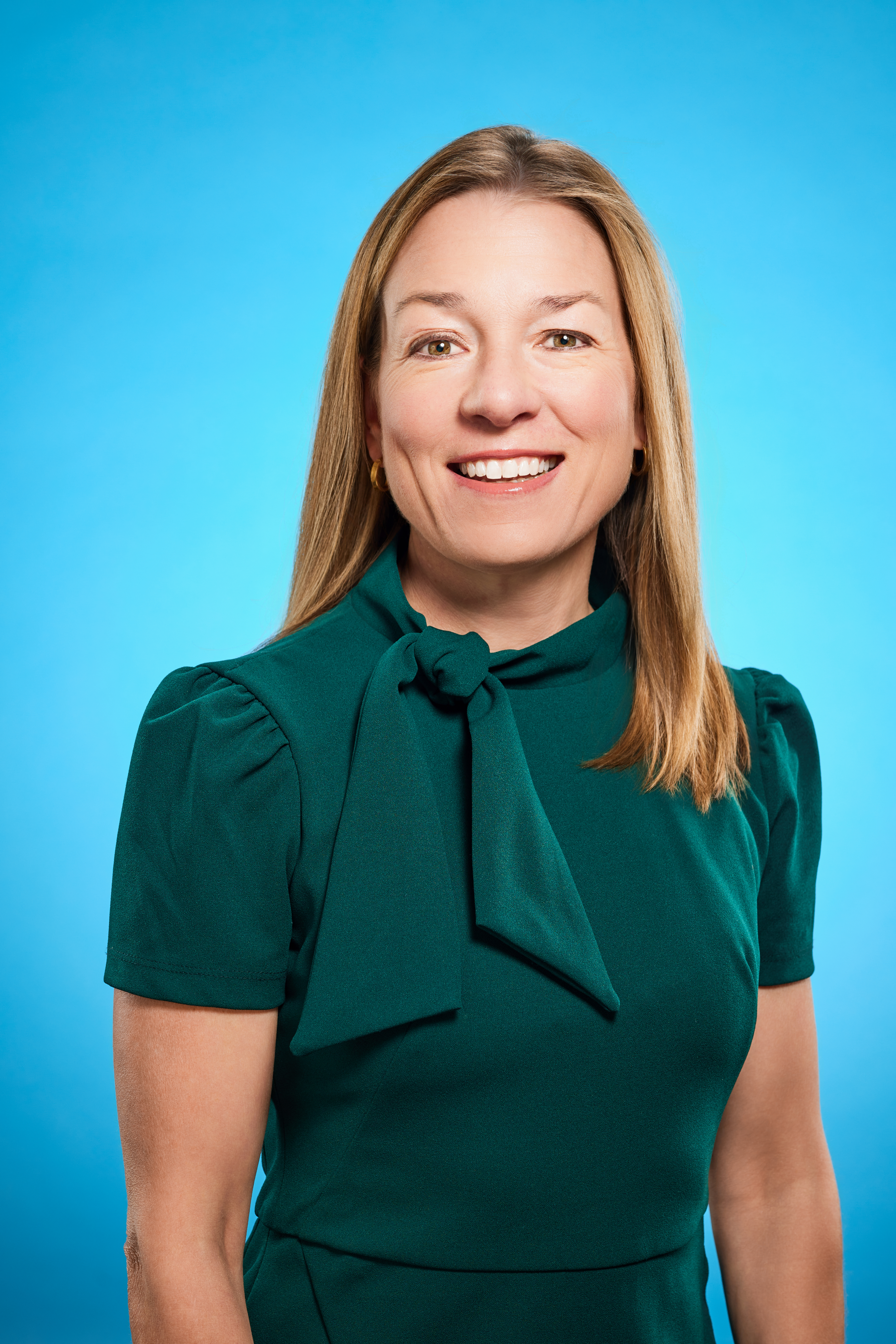

Candidate	Lauren McLean	Mike Masterson
Popular vote	33,926	26,542
Percentage	55.4%	43.4%
- Results by precinct McLean: 40–50% 50–60% 60–70% 70–80% 80–90% Masterson: 40–50% 50–60% 60–70% 70–80%
Mayor before election
Lauren McLean
Elected Mayor
Lauren McLean

The 2023 Boise mayoral election was held on November 7, 2023, to elect the mayor of Boise, Idaho. The election was officially nonpartisan. Incumbent mayor Lauren McLean won re-election to a second term in office, defeating former Boise police chief Mike Masterson and two other candidates.

== Candidates ==
=== Declared ===
- Joe Evans, data engineer, former military intelligence analyst, and Libertarian nominee for Idaho's 1st congressional district in 2020 and 2022
- Mike Masterson, former Boise Chief of Police (2005–2015)
- Lauren McLean, incumbent mayor
- Aaron Reis, activist

== Endorsements ==
Mike Masterson

State legislators

- Dave Bieter, former mayor of Boise (2004–2020) and former state representative from the 19th district (1999–2003)
- Maryanne Jordan, former state senator from the 17th district (2015–2020) and former Boise City Council president (2005–2006, 2010–2015) from the 6th district (2003–2017) (serving as campaign treasurer)

Labor unions

- Fraternal Order of Police – National, Treasure Valley, and Canyon County chapters
- International Association of Fire Fighters Local 149
- International Brotherhood of Police Officers Local 486
Lauren McLean

State legislators

- Holli Woodings, former state representative from the 19th district (2012–2014) and former Boise City Council president (2023) from the 6th district (2018–2023)

Municipal officials

- Elaine Clegg, Valley Regional Transit Chief Executive Officer (2023–present) and former Boise City Council president (2021–2023) from the 5th district (2004–2023)

Newspapers and other media

- Idaho Statesman

Organizations

- Conservation Voters of Idaho
- EMILY's List
- Planned Parenthood Alliance Advocates

Political parties

- Ada County Democratic Party
Declined to endorse

Organizations

- Boise Regional Realtors

== Results ==
2023 Boise mayoral election
Candidate	Votes	%
Lauren McLean (incumbent)	33,926	55.45%
Mike Masterson	26,542	43.38%
Joe Evans	563	0.92%
Aaron Reis	153	0.25%
Total votes	61,184	100.00%
