= 2007 Boise mayoral election =

← 2003	November 6, 2007	2011 →
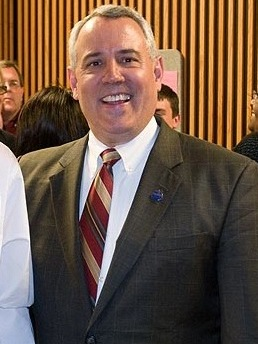

Candidate	Dave Bieter	Jim Tibbs
Party	Nonpartisan	Nonpartisan
Popular vote	20,556	11,528
Percentage	64.07%	35.93%
Mayor before election
Dave Bieter
Nonpartisan
Elected mayor
Dave Bieter
Nonpartisan

The 2007 Boise mayoral election was held on November 6, 2007, to elect the mayor of Boise, Idaho. Incumbent Mayor Dave Bieter ran for re-election to a second term, and was challenged by City Councilman Jim Tibbs. Bieter defeated Tibbs in a landslide, winning his second term with 64 percent of the vote.

== General election ==
=== Candidates ===
- Dave Bieter, incumbent Mayor
- Jim Tibbs, City Councilman, former Chief of Police

==== Declined ====
- Chuck Winder, real estate agent, 2003 candidate for Mayor

==== Results ====
2007 Boise mayoral election
Party	Candidate	Votes	%
Nonpartisan	David Bieter (inc.)	20,556	64.07%
Nonpartisan	Jim Tibbs	11,528	35.93%
Total votes		32,084	100.00%
