= 2003 Boise mayoral election =

- November 4, 2003
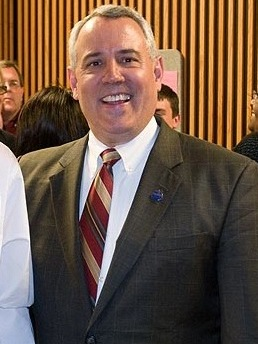

Candidate	Dave Bieter	Chuck Winder	Vaughn Killeen
Party	Nonpartisan	Nonpartisan	Nonpartisan
Popular vote	22,320	11,230	8,168
Percentage	51.87%	26.10%	18.98%
Mayor before election
Carolyn Terteling-Payne (interim)
Nonpartisan
Elected mayor
Dave Bieter
Nonpartisan

The 2003 Boise mayoral election was held on November 4, 2003, to elect the mayor of Boise, Idaho. Mayor Brent Coles, who was elected in 2001, resigned on February 15, 2003, after being charged with bribery. Under state law, in the event of a mayoral vacancy, the city council appoints an interim successor, who serves until the "next general city election," when a mayor is elected "for the full four year term." The City Council selected city Councilwoman Carolyn Terteling-Payne to serve as interim Mayor, and she did not run for a full term in the election.

Four candidates ran in the election: State Representative Dave Bieter, County Sheriff Vaughn Killeen, State Transportation Board Chairman Chuck Winder, and restaurateur Max Mohammadi. Under an ordinance approved in 2003, if no candidate received a majority of the vote, a runoff election would take place. However, Bieter won the election in a landslide and avoided the need for a runoff, reeiving 52 percent of the vote to Winder's 26 percent, Killeen's 19 percent, and Mohammadi's 3 percent.

== General election ==
=== Candidates ===
- Dave Bieter, State Representative
- Chuck Winder, Chairman of the Idaho Transportation Board, 1994 Republican candidate for Governor
- Vaughn Killeen, Ada County Sheriff
- Max Mohammadi, restaurateur

==== Declined ====
- Rod Beck, former State Senator, 2001 candidate for Mayor
- Paula Forney, City Councilwoman
- Jerome Mapp, City Council President
- Bruce Perry, attorney, 2002 Democratic nominee for Lieutenant Governor
- Betty Richardson, former U.S. Attorney for the District of Idaho, 2002 Democratic nominee for Congress in Idaho's 1st congressional district

=== Results ===
2003 Boise mayoral election
Party	Candidate	Votes	%
Nonpartisan	Dave Bieter	22,320	51.87%
Nonpartisan	Chuck Winder	11,230	26.10%
Nonpartisan	Vaughn Killeen	8,168	18.98%
Nonpartisan	Max Mohammadi	1,313	3.05%
Write-in		3	0.01%
Total votes		43,034	100.00%
