= Add The Words, Idaho =

LGBTQ2A activist group and political action committee

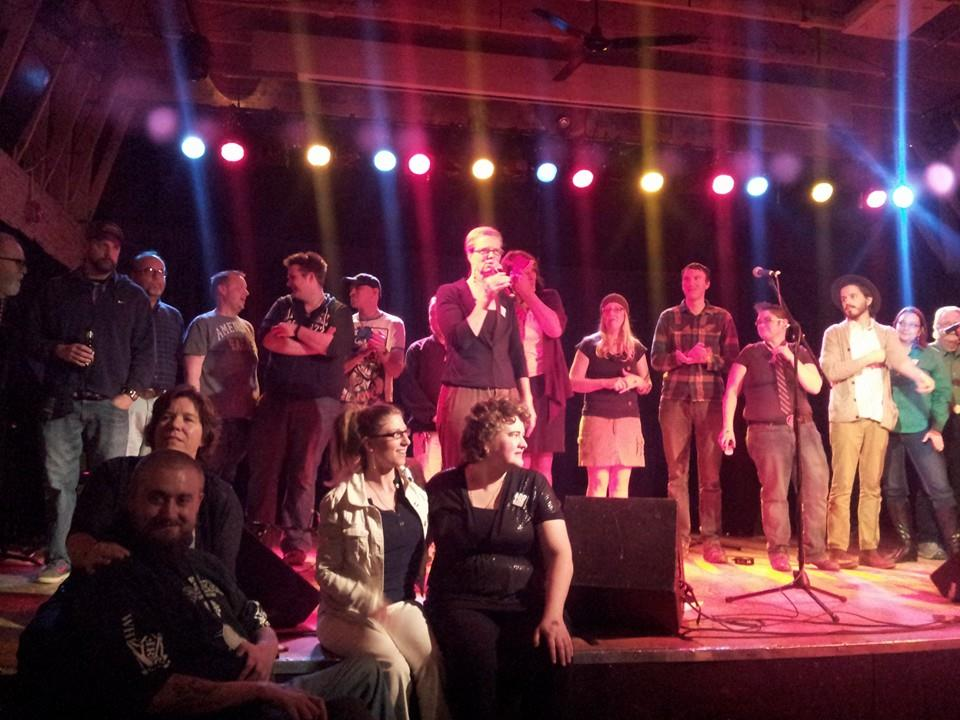
Nicole LeFavour, speaking at a bail benefit held at the Visual Arts Collective, presents a few of the activists who had been arrested

Add The Words, Idaho is an LGBTQ activist group and political action committee (PAC) in the United States, extant since 2010, which advocates adding the words "sexual orientation" and "gender identity" to the state's human rights act; this group grew out of several others which had been advocating the same. After ten years, however, Add The Words activists have been unable to achieve any statewide protections for LGBTQ Idahoans. An associated all-volunteer direct action group, Add The 4 Words Idaho, under the leadership of former state senator Nicole LeFavour, undertook a series of civil disobedience protests beginning on February 3, 2014, at the Idaho Capitol. (The PAC and the direct action group are commonly conflated as Add The Words. This article covers the series of peaceful direct actions/protests, the associated peaceful demonstrations, and the resultant printing and hearing of HB 002, which ultimately died in committee.)

== Protests ==
Under the leadership of the Add the 4 Words group, 44 people were arrested on suspicion of misdemeanor trespassing, having blocked the Idaho Senate's entrances for more than two hours in a silent protest two months in the planning. Three of those arrested were juveniles, and LeFavour herself was, unexpectedly, the last person to be arrested after the Idaho Senate voted to suspend its rule which allows former members to be on the Senate floor.

Add The 4 Words Idaho announced in a press release that "We are here to insist the Idaho Legislature finally add four words, 'sexual orientation' and 'gender identity,' to Idaho's Human Rights Act to prevent the suicides, beatings, loss of jobs, evictions and the fear that too many gay and transgender Idahoans live with every day. We do this for those who live in fear and those who may despair this year if no one speaks for them.... Gay and transgender Idahoans have tried every means to get the Legislature to consider the ‘Add the Words’ legislation. If the Legislature again chooses to ignore us and not hear or vote on the bill, we are prepared to peacefully remain here to bring attention to the issue and the Legislature's failure to protect those in our community from harm."

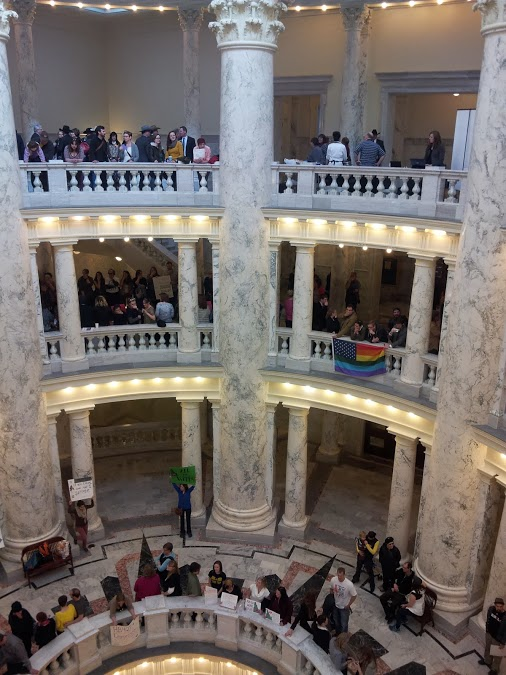
A mass demonstration on Presidents Day 2014

A second demonstration of at least 65 people was held February 13; no arrests were made, inasmuch as the protestors silently surrounded the Statehouse rotunda after being refused entry into the Senate and House galleries (where political demonstrations are not allowed, including the wearing of T-shirts with political slogans).

A third demonstration of roughly 200 people was held at the Statehouse on February 17, filling multiple rotunda floors. No arrests were made as it was a mass non-arrest demonstration; the activists mingled freely with representatives from Idaho's livestock industry and schoolchildren promoting school choice.

At a fourth protest, held on February 20, 32 protesters were arrested, and at a fourth, held on February 27, 46 were arrested. By the end of February 2014, 122 arrests had been made (with some protestors having been arrested than once, and all of whom are being represented pro bono), and negotiations between LGBTQ2A-rights advocates and religiously conservative legislators had tentatively begun.

On March 4, 23 arrests at a fifth protest were made when demonstrators blocked public and private entrances to Gov. "Butch" Otter's office. Former State Senator Nicole LeFavour (arrested four times in five weeks) remarked the protesters were particularly concerned about the lack of discrimination statutes on gay teens in the state, given that a Pocatello, Idaho homosexual teenager had recently committed suicide after being bullied at school, whereas Gov. Otter expressed concern, given the continuing nature of the protests, that the targeted closing of the legislative session (which takes $30,000 a day to operate) for March 21 may be delayed, and the Idaho State Police, which patrols the Statehouse but which perforce has had to pull several highway patrol officers from their usual duties in surrounding counties in order to perform the mass arrests, estimates that at a cost of $3,000 to $6,600 per arrest that the protests have cost taxpayers $19,600 as of March 6.

On March 12, Nicole LeFavour and several others were arrested at the Idaho Statehouse (at least her sixth arrest).

On March 2, 2015, 22 activists were arrested. The campaign continues to have the support of many small Idaho businesses.

On January 16, 2016, 600 people rallied on the capitol steps in support of adding the words, a position on which they shall not, as a matter of human rights, compromise; there was a small counter-demonstration.

=== Judicial consequences ===
In late July 2014 at a packed court hearing more than twenty activists (those who had been arrested at least twice) were sentenced to community service and dealt court fines, having agreed to plea deals; most received ten hours of community service and a $10 fine for each charge against them, and some had some charges dropped, whereas Nicole LeFavour, who as one of the group's leaders was arrested seven times, received 70 hours of community service and $70 in fines.

== Support ==
Republican former governor Phil Batt, who has a gay grandson and who authored the state's 1969 Human Rights act, supports Add The Words; Idaho is one of 28 states which does not specifically protect LGBTQ2A people from discrimination in employment and housing.

Clergy and laity associated with the Interfaith Equality Coalition, amongst other Idaho citizenry, have been providing moral support to the ongoing protests during the legislative session by holding silent vigils at 12:04 p.m. daily; other peaceful demonstrations also continued. Following the adjournment sine die, the activists made plans to take their training sessions to the local, civic level in various cities as requested, beginning with Moscow and McCall but also including Twin Falls, Pocatello, and Idaho Falls, in light of the Idaho legislature's non-engagement with Republican and Mormon families who deal with LGBTQ issues daily. Furthermore, the National Association for the Advancement of Colored People has noted that "when a government allows the civil rights of any group to be compromised, the rights of all groups are compromised", and has sent its expert on voter turn-out to the state, and MDG Films is producing a documentary on the campaign which had a test screening at the historic Egyptian Theatre on June 15, 2014.

== Impact on legislation ==
On January 15, 2015, the House Ways and Means committee voted 9–1 to send House Bill 2 (HB 002) to the House State Affairs committee for a hearing, finally printing the bill for consideration after nine years. On the 17th a rally of more than a thousand people was held on the steps of the Statehouse.

On January 29, 2015, after nearly 21 hours of testimony spread over three days from 190 people, the Idaho House State Affairs Committee ultimately voted 13-4 along party lines (Republican-Democrat) to keep the bill in committee, effectively killing it for the legislative session. 134 people had spoken in favor of the bill, 54 were opposed, and two were neutral, and impromptu reprises of the "hands over mouth" silent demonstrations took place in the corridors of the statehouse after the committee's final vote, some of whom wept. Rep. Ken Andrus, R-Lava Hot Springs, remarked to supporters of the bill that "We have come a long way. I think this very hearing has brought us a long, long way... Do not despair. Your concerns are legitimate, very legitimate, and people in Idaho and in the Legislature have heard you and are hearing you." Furthermore, some members who had voted against the bill expressed possible support for a future compromise bill, and the Idaho Statesman had editorialized in support of the bill itself. The Ada County Highway District commission had the night before added the words under its own aegis. On January 18, 2019, Boise senator Maryanne Jordan proposed adding the words in a personal bill SB1015 (such bills do not require committee perusal). Furthermore, such legislation had not been introduced in the two legislative sessions prior, and most of her Democratic colleagues in the House and Senate were co-signers.

As of January 10, 2020, Add The Words, Idaho Chairwoman Chelsea Gaona-Lincoln (also Chairwoman of the Canyon County Democratic Party) has been unable to lead the Add The Words movement to a win. In spite of the repeated failure of the group to effect statewide change, several localities have passed measures which protect LGBTQ2A citizens - Boise, Coeur d'Alene, Driggs, Idaho falls, Ketchum, Lewiston, Moscow, Meridian, Pocatello, Sandpoint, Twin Falls and Victor as well as Latah County. Notably, Canyon County is absent of any protections in spite of being home to the Chairwoman of Add The Words, Idaho. Critics of the movement has questioned whether Idaho should support behavior that is explicitly against the teachings of the Bible. However, Utah enacted such protections in 2015 in cooperation with entities such as the Church of Jesus Christ of Latter Day Saints. During the 2020 I Idaho Legislative session it is unlikely that protections will even be broadly discussed.

Vote to hold in committee
Yea	Constituency
Chairman Thomas F. Loertscher (R)	Iona
Vice Chairman Gayle L. Batt (R)	Wilder
Ken Andrus(R)	Lava Hot Springs
Lynn M. Luker (R)	Boise
Brent J. Crane (R)	Nampa
Joe Palmer(R)	Meridian
Kathleen Sims (R)	Coeur d'Alene
Vito Barbieri (R)	Dalton Gardens
James Holtzclaw (R)	Meridian
Shannon McMillan (R)	Silverton
Linden B. Bateman (R)	Idaho Falls
Don Cheatham (R)	Post Falls
Pete Nielsen (R)	Mountain Home

Vote to hold in committee
Nay	Constituency
Elaine Smith (D)	Pocatello
Paulette Jordan (D)	Plummer
John McCrostie (D)	Garden City
Melissa Wintrow (D)	Boise

== 2010-2013 ==
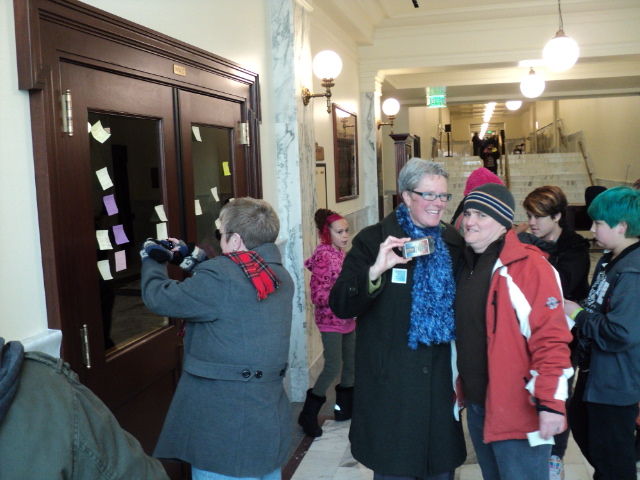
The Post-it note era

== 2014 ==
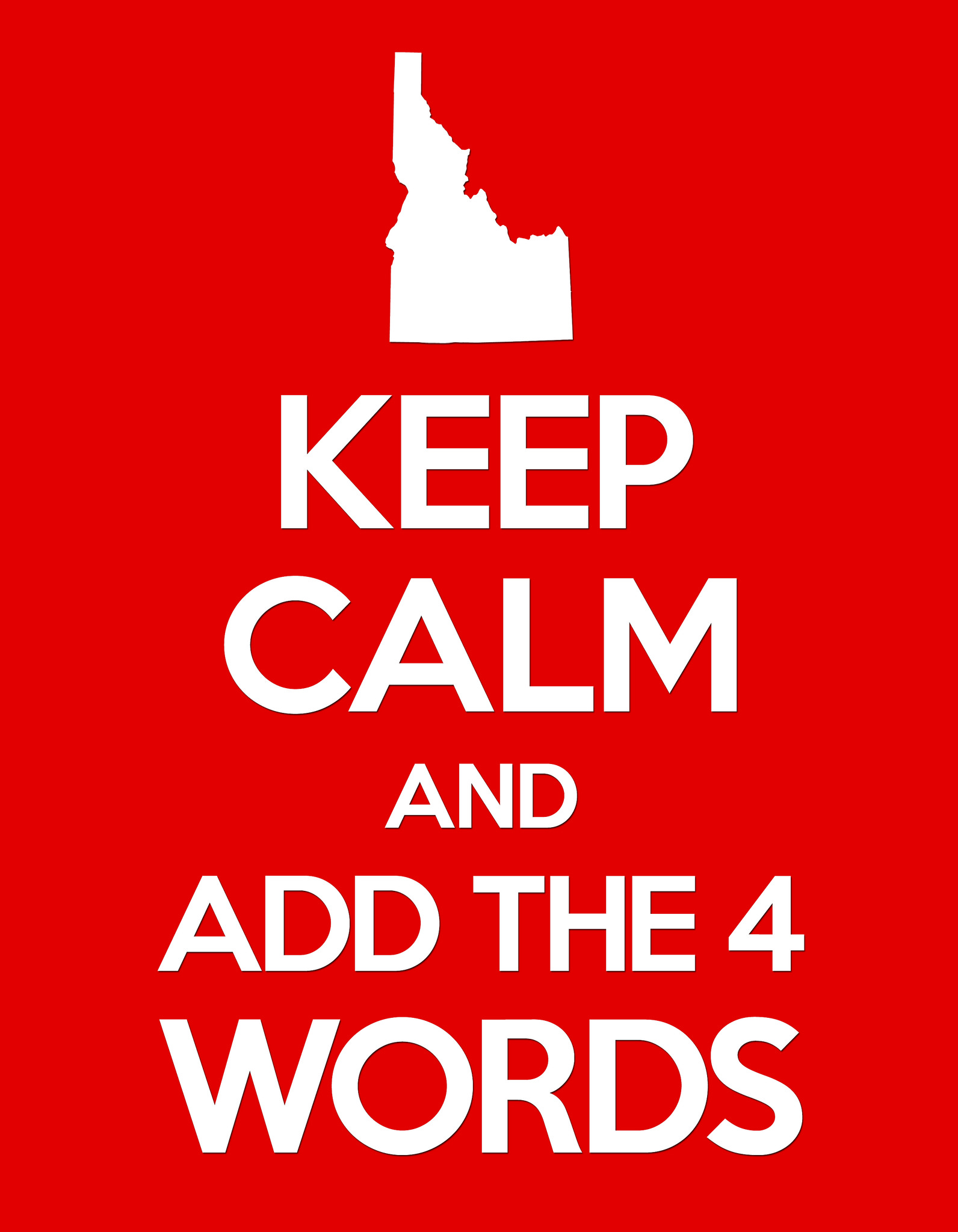
A co-optation of the Keep Calm and Carry On meme

Role playing an arrest scenario featuring a journalist during an early training session

"We Shall Overcome" sung in Capitol Park

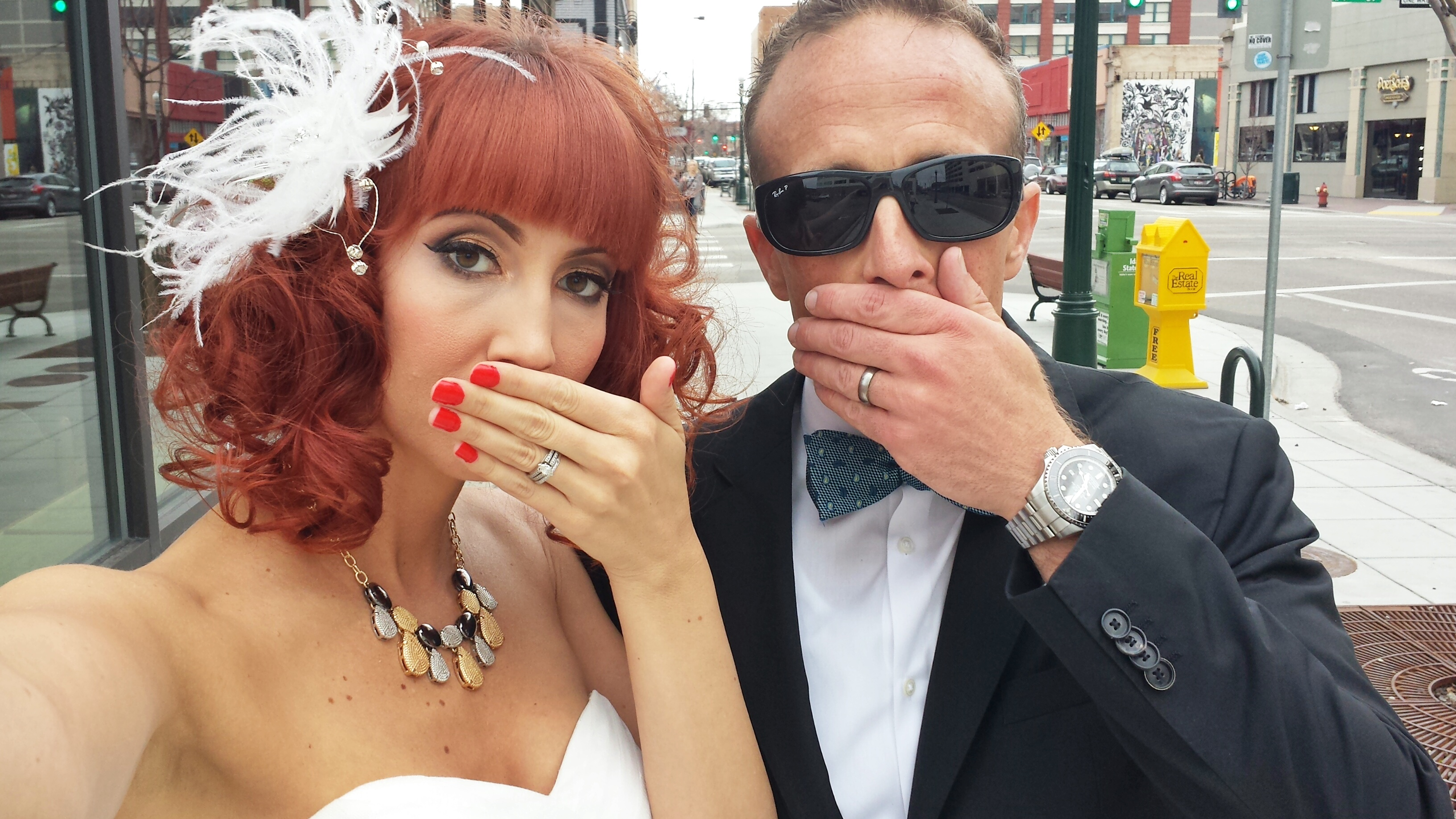
Newlyweds
