= Maryanne Jordan =

American politician from Idaho

Member of the Idaho Senate from District 17
- In office March 6, 2015 – December 1, 2020
- Preceded by: Elliot Werk
- Succeeded by: Alison Rabe

Member of the Boise City Council for Seat 6
- In office March 4, 2003 – 2017
- Preceded by: Carolyn Terteling-Payne
- Succeeded by: Holli Woodings

Personal details
- Born: May 12, 1956 (age 70)
- Party: Democratic
- Spouse: Rocky
- Education: San Jose State University
- Occupation: Politician

Maryanne Jordan (born May 12, 1956) is an American Democratic politician from Boise, Idaho. She has served on the Boise City Council since 2003, and was president from 2005 to 2006, and 2010–2015. In March 2015 she was appointed to the Idaho Senate by Gov. Butch Otter to succeed Elliot Werk, who resigned the previous month to take a seat on the Idaho State Tax Commission.

Jordan holds a degree in political science from San Jose State University. She moved to Boise in 1994, serving on the West Valley Neighborhood Association and the Boise City Planning and Zoning Commission. Jordan was appointed to the Boise City Council in March 2003 to succeed Carolyn Terteling-Payne, who became mayor upon the resignation of H. Brent Coles. Jordan was elected to complete the term in November 2003, and won full four-year terms in 2005, 2009 and 2013.

In March 2015 Jordan was appointed to the Idaho Senate to represent District 17 – based in the Boise Bench neighborhood – upon Werk's resignation. She served concurrently in the Idaho Senate and on the Boise City Council through 2017. Jordan currently serves as Minority Caucus Chair of the Idaho Senate. In 2020, Jordan announced she would not seek reelection.

== Elections ==
District 17 Senate - Part of Ada County.
| Year | Candidate | Votes | Pct | Candidate | Votes | Pct |
|---|---|---|---|---|---|---|
| 2016 Primary | Maryanne Jordan (incumbent) | 1,288 | 100.0% | | | |
| 2016 General | Maryanne Jordan (incumbent) | 10,586 | 62.9% | Robert Herrin III | 6,235 | 37.1% |
