= Climate change in Idaho =

Climate change in the US state of Idaho

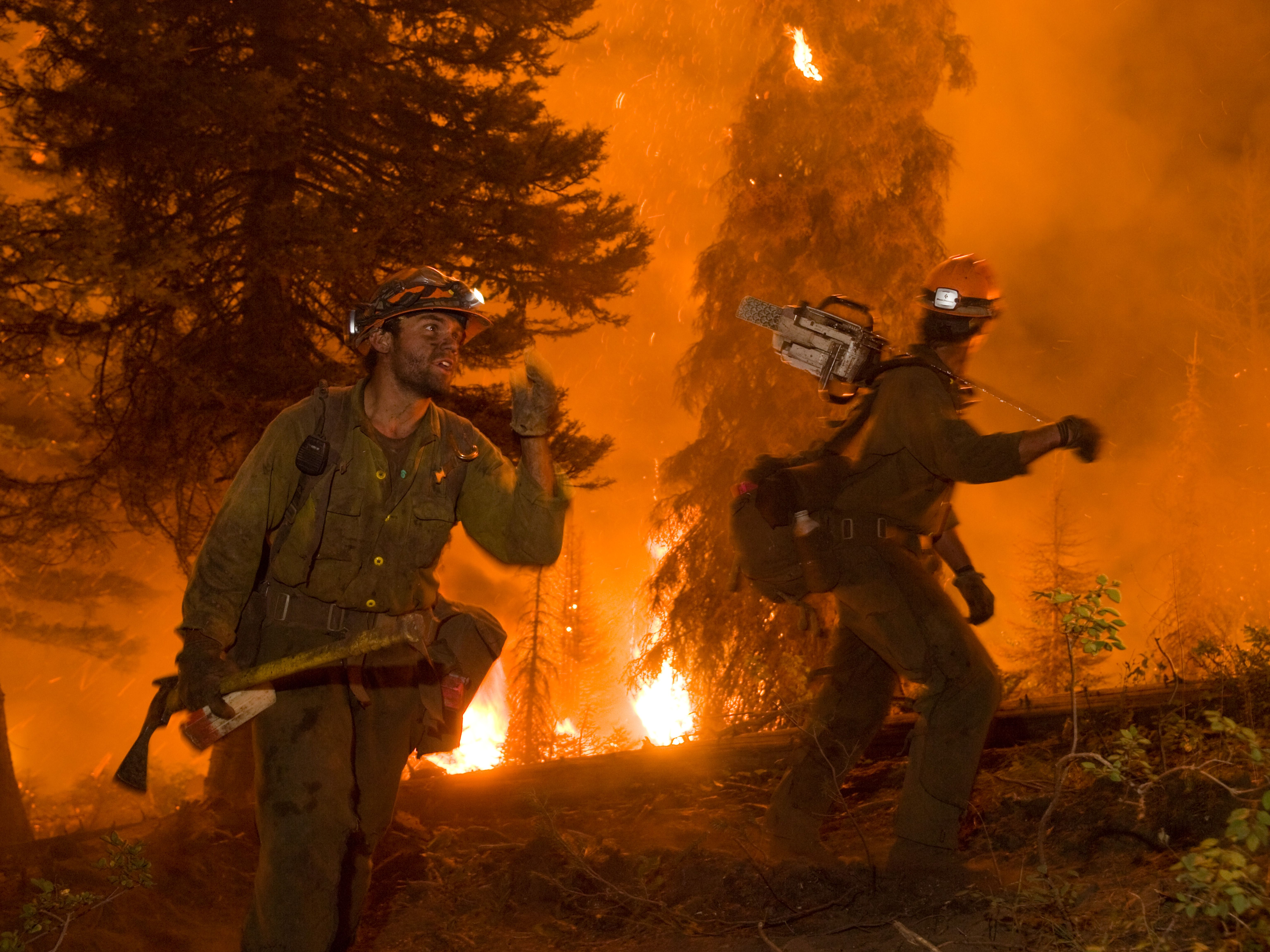
Firefighters in Boise National Forest

Like other parts of the world, climate in Idaho has changed dramatically over the geologic history of the Earth. Paleo-climatic records give some indication of these changes. The longest instrumented records of climate in Idaho extend back to the late 1800s. Concern over human induced climate change through the emission of carbon dioxide from fossil fuels and methane from agriculture and industry, are driving research efforts across the state at university, state, and federals levels to understand what the implications of climate change could be in Idaho.

In the big picture of greenhouse gas emissions, Idaho emits the least carbon dioxide per person of the United States, less than 23,000 pounds a year. It relies mostly on nonpolluting hydroelectric power from its rivers.

Like other parts of the world, Idaho has seen significant temperature increases, especially in the last several decades. From 1971 to 2005 the average annual observed temperature in the Snake River Plain, located in southern Idaho, has increased by 1.4 degrees Celsius based on data from 10 climate stations (Dubois, Ashton, Oakely, Pocatello, Aberdeen, Hazelton, Jerome, Boise, Nampa, and Payette). Statistically, the increasing temperature trends are most significant in the months of January, March, and April. While precipitation has generally increased since the early 1900s, the high variability in precipitation makes the identification of precipitation trends statistically difficult.

Over the course of the 21st century, the climate in Idaho is expected to experience additional changes due both to 'natural' climate variability and due to feedbacks related to the interaction between climate variability and increasing greenhouse gases. For example, based on projections made by the Intergovernmental Panel on Climate Change and results from the United Kingdom Hadley Centre’s climate model (HadCM2), a model that accounts for both greenhouse gases and aerosols, by 2100 temperatures in Idaho could increase by 5 °F (2.8 °C) (with a range of 2 °F (1.1 °C) to 9 °F (5.0 °C)) in winter and summer and 4 °F (2.2 °C) (with a range of 2 °F (1.1 °C) to 7 °F (3.9 °C)) in spring and fall. Precipitation is estimated to change little in summer, to increase by 10% in spring and fall (with a range of 5-20%), and to increase by 20% in winter (with a range of 10-40%). Other climate models may show different results, especially regarding estimated changes in precipitation. The impacts described in the sections that follow take into account estimates from different models. The amount of precipitation on extreme wet or snowy days in winter is likely to increase. The frequency of extreme hot days in summer would increase because of the general warming trend. It is not clear how the severity of storms might be affected, although an increase in the frequency and intensity of winter storms is possible.

== Climate change impacts ==
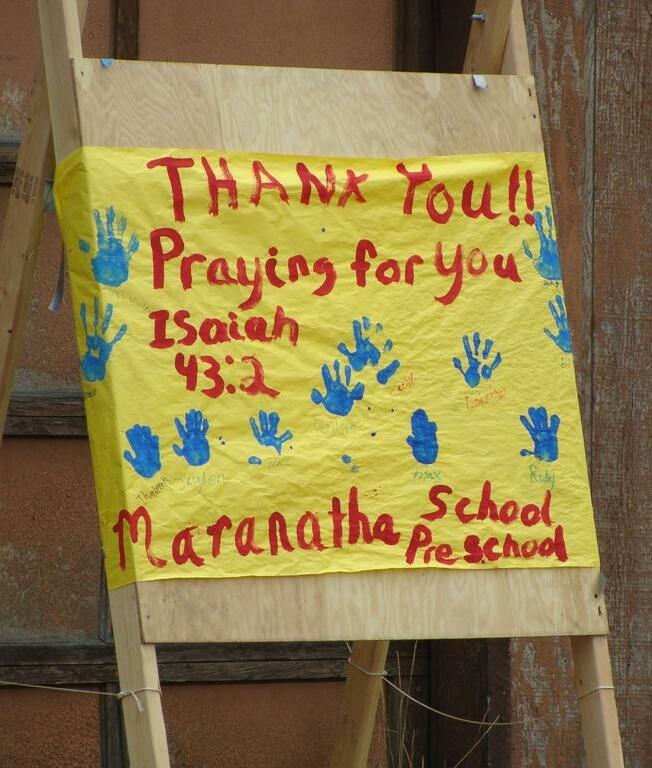
Sign praying for firefighters, Maranatha School, 2013

=== Human health ===
Warming and other climate changes could expand the habitat and infectivity of disease-carrying insects. Mosquitoes in Idaho can carry malaria, and some can carry western equine encephalitis, which can be lethal or cause neurological damage. Warmer temperatures could increase the incidence of Lyme disease and other tick-borne diseases in Idaho, because populations of ticks, and their rodent hosts, could increase under warmer temperatures and increased vegetation.

=== Water resources ===
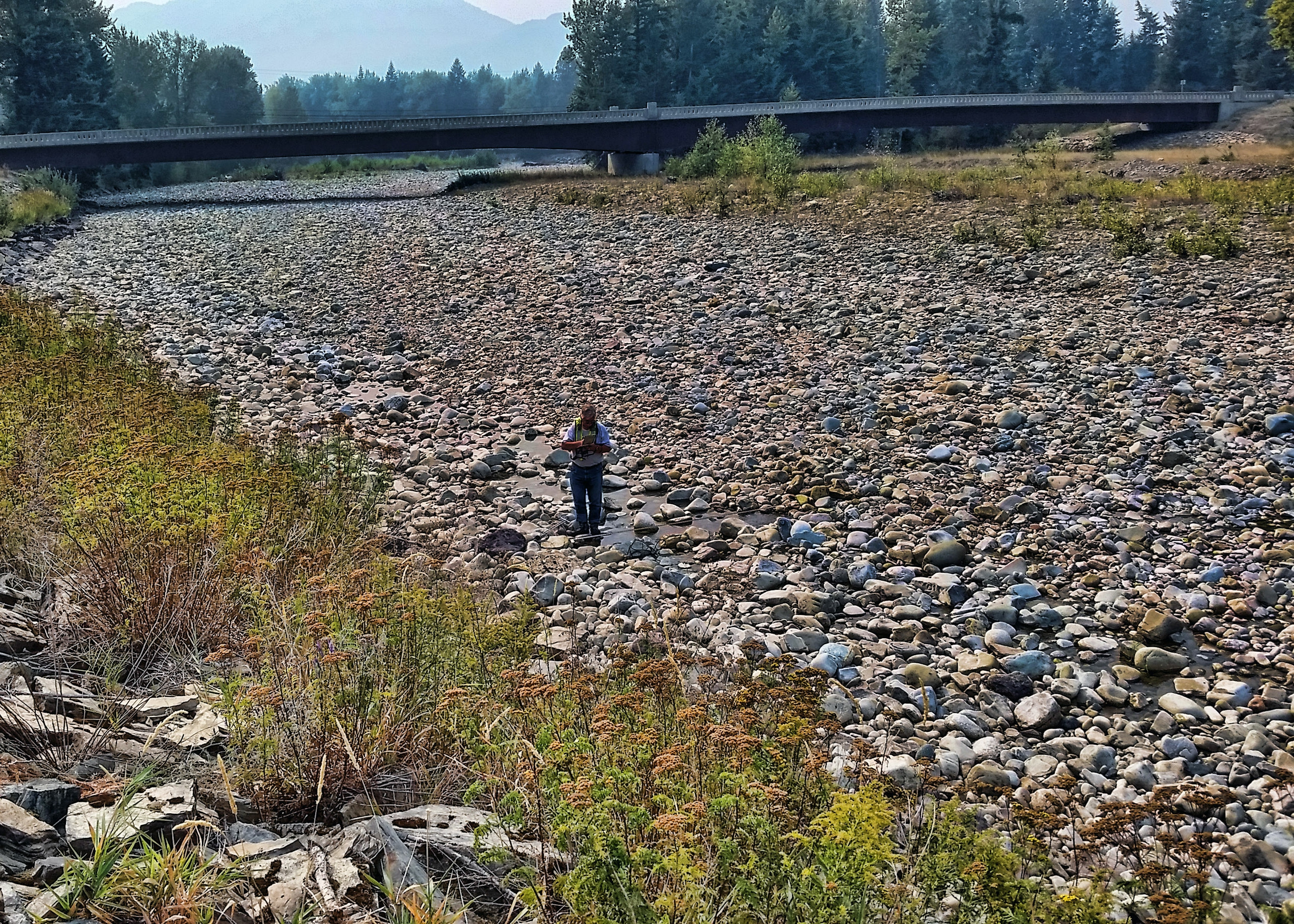
Lightning Creek, Clark Fork, dried up in 2015

Idaho relies primarily on surface, but groundwater is also an important source of supply. Most of Idaho is drained by tributaries to the Columbia River, including the Spokane, Pend Oreille, Kootenai, and Snake rivers. These rivers are regulated by dams and reservoirs to reduce spring flooding and augment summer flows. Runoff in the state is strongly affected by winter snow accumulation and spring snowmelt. A warmer climate could mean less snowfall, more winter rain, and a faster, earlier snowmelt. This could result in lower reservoirs and water supplies in the summer and fall. Additionally, without increases in precipitation, higher summer temperatures and increased evaporation also would contribute to lower streamflows and lake levels in the summer. Drier summer conditions would intensify competition for water among the diverse and growing demands in Idaho.

=== Agriculture ===
As climate warms, production patterns could shift northward. Increases in climate variability could make adaptation by farmers more difficult. Warmer climates and less soil moisture due to increased evaporation may increase the need for irrigation. However, these same conditions could decrease water supplies.

In Idaho, production agriculture is a $2.8 billion annual industry, 60% of which comes from crops. Almost 70% of the farmed acres are irrigated. The major crops in the state are wheat, hay, barley, and potatoes. Climate change could increase wheat yields by 9-18%. Barley and hay could increase by 12%, and potato yields could fall by 18% under severe conditions where temperatures rise beyond the tolerance levels of the crop. Farmed acres could rise or fall by 10%, depending on how climate changes.

=== Forest ===
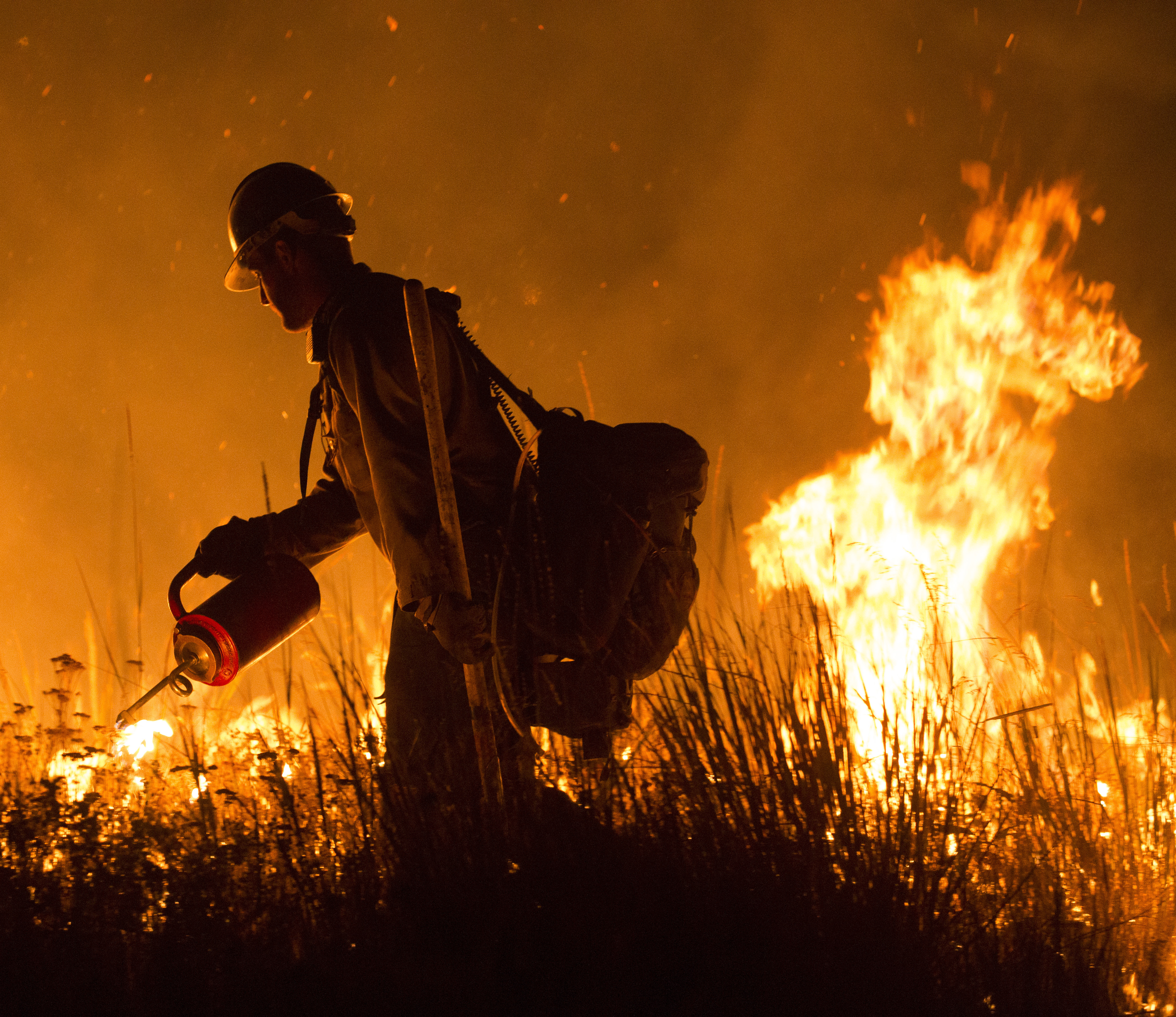
Firefighter, Boise National Forest, 2016

Hotter, drier weather could increase the frequency and intensity of wildfires, threatening both property and forests. Drier conditions would reduce the range and health of lodgepole and Douglas-fir forests, and increase their susceptibility to fire.

Grass and rangeland could expand into previously forested areas along the eastern slope of the Rocky Mountains and into some of the western valleys.

Changes would significantly affect the character of Idaho forests and the activities that depend on them.

=== Ecosystems ===
Idaho is rich in ecological diversity.

Climate change could exacerbate many of the problems facing ecosystems in Idaho. Although wildfires are a natural and necessary part of the ecology of western forests, changes in fire regimes under climate change have significant implications.

Climate change poses a threat to high alpine systems, and could lead to their significant decline. Local extinctions of alpine species such as arctic gentian, alpine chaenactis, rosy finch and water pipit have resulted from habitat loss and fragmentation, both of which could worsen under climate change. Whitebark pine forest could be replaced with Douglas fir. On the lower slopes, forests would give way to treeless landscapes dominated by sagebrush, Idaho fescue, and bluebunch wheatgrass.

== Action to address climate change ==
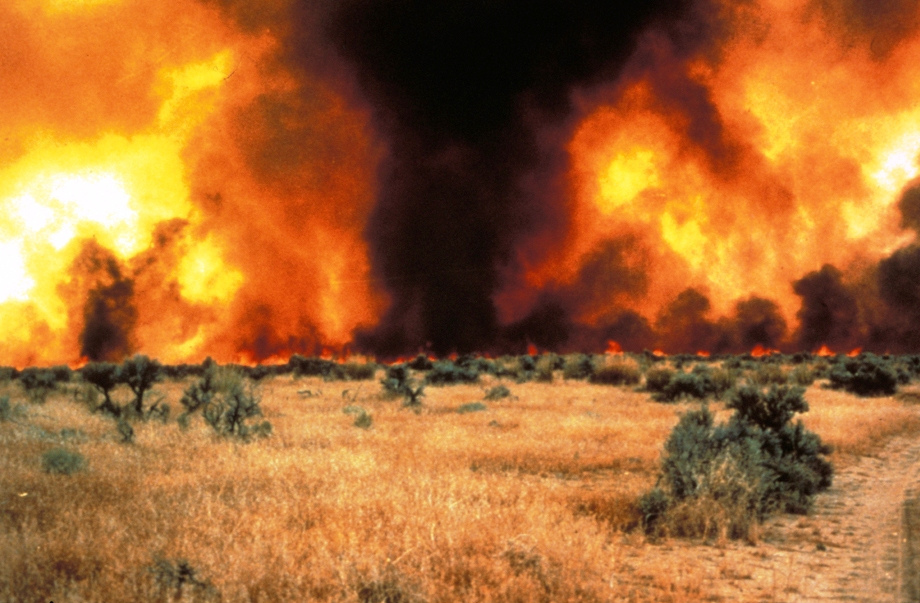
Smoke pollution from wildfires, Mountain Home

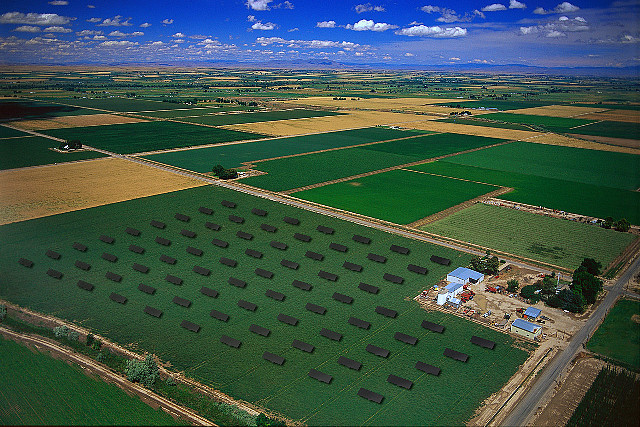
Solar farm, Canyon County

Idaho is the home of the Yellowstone-Teton Clean Energy Coalition and the Treasure Valley Clean Cities Coalition. In April 2024, the Gem State's Department of Environmental Quality applied to the US EPA for a US $100 million competitive grant to lower the state's greenhouse gas emission levels.

=== Renewable energy and propulsion ===
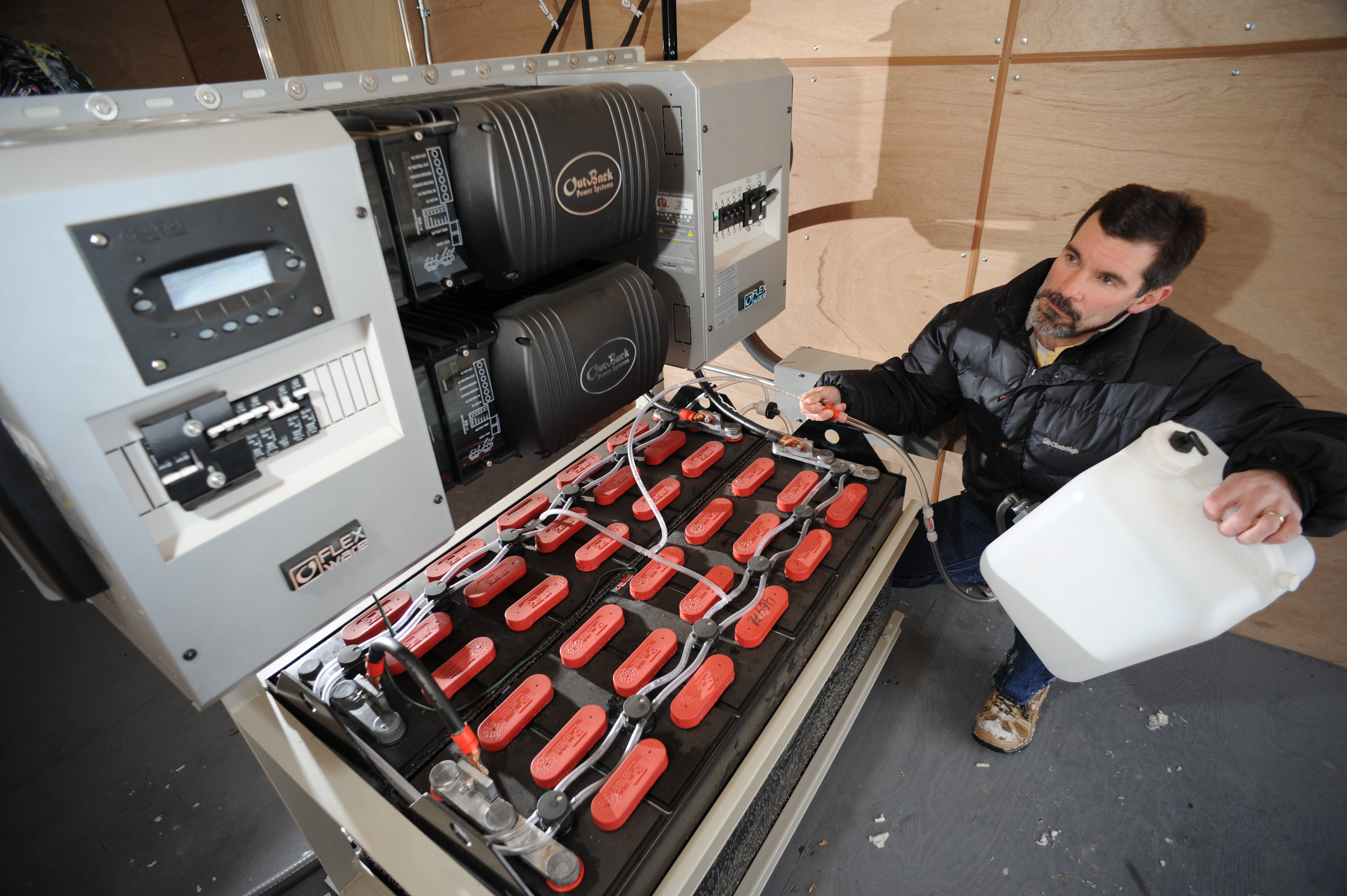
Solar battery testing, Idaho National Laboratory

==== Alternative Fuels Tax ====
The motor fuel tax rate of $0.25 per gallon does not apply to special fuels dispensed into a motor vehicle that uses gaseous special fuels and displays a valid gaseous special fuels permit. Special fuels include compressed and liquefied natural gas, liquefied petroleum gas, hydrogen, and fuel suitable for use in diesel engines. The state excise tax on special fuels, determined on a gasoline gallon equivalent basis, still applies. Alternatively, an annual fee in lieu of the excise tax may be collected on a vehicle powered by gaseous special fuels, according to the gross vehicle weight rating of the vehicle. State government agencies are entitled to a refund of any special fuels tax paid to the vendor from which the fuel was purchased. No refund of special fuels tax shall be paid on special fuels used while idling a registered motor vehicle. Idling means a period of time greater than 15 minutes when the motor vehicle is stationary with the engine operating.

==== State Agency Petroleum Reduction Plan ====
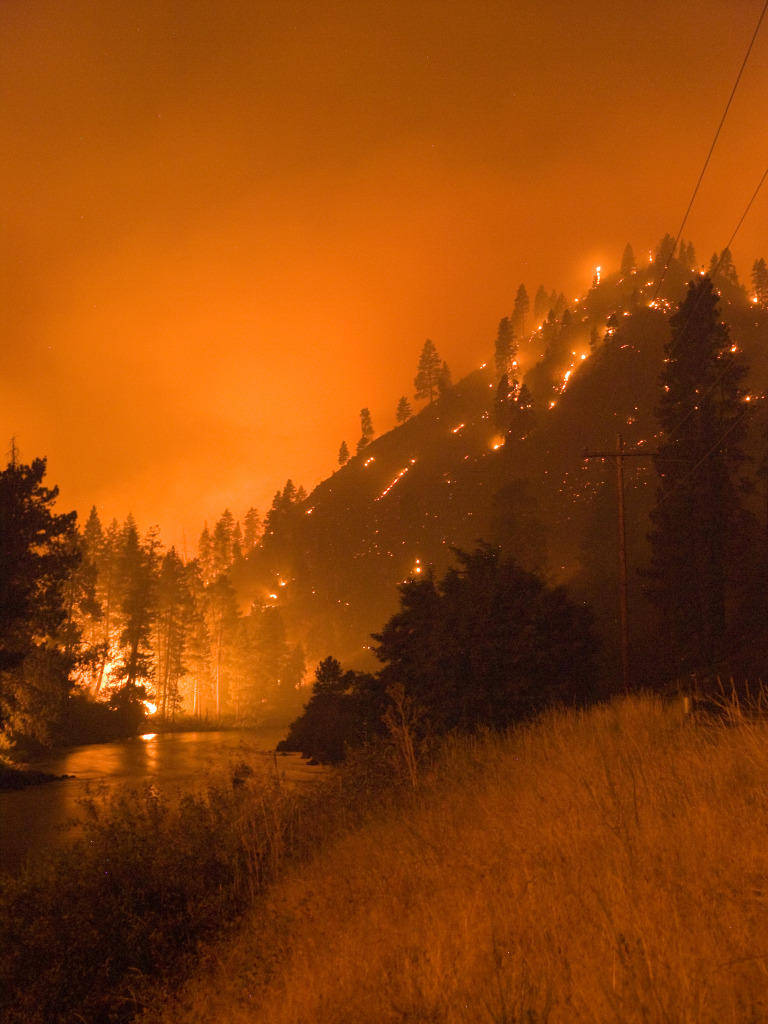
Springs Fire, 2012

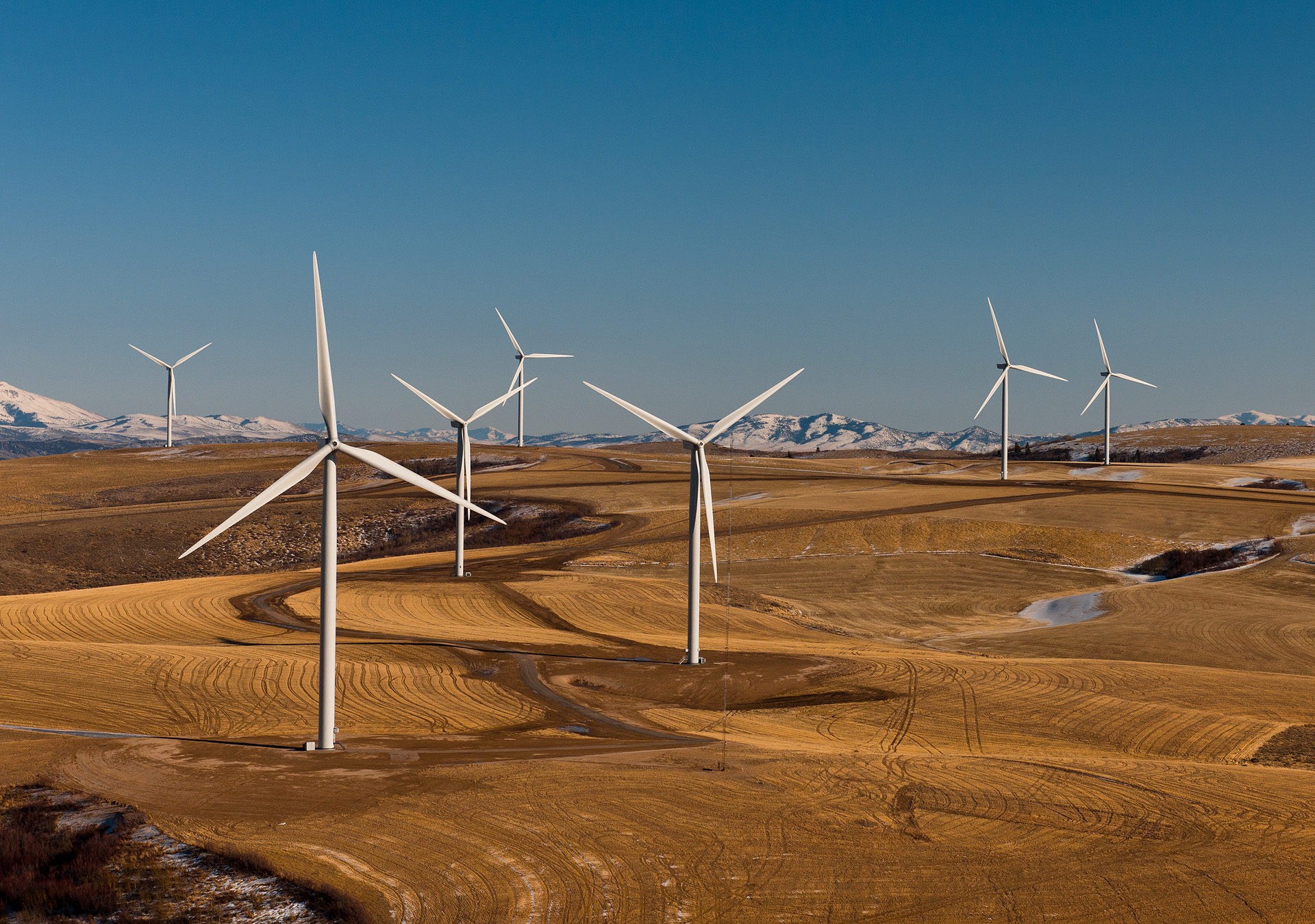
Wind farm, Power County

All executive branch state agencies are required to reduce the petroleum consumption of their fleets by increasing the fuel economy of their vehicles and reducing the number of miles driven by each employee. Agencies must also give priority to acquiring hybrid electric vehicles and other fuel-efficient, low-emissions vehicles.

== See also ==
- List of U.S. states and territories by carbon dioxide emissions
- Plug-in electric vehicles in Idaho
