= Mat Erpelding =

American politician from Idaho (born 1975)

Minority Leader of the Idaho House of Representatives
- In office January 13, 2017 – December 6, 2019
- Preceded by: John Rusche
- Succeeded by: Ilana Rubel

Member of the Idaho House of Representatives from the 19th district Seat A
- In office December 1, 2012 – December 6, 2019
- Preceded by: Cherie Buckner-Webb
- Succeeded by: Lauren Necochea

Personal details
- Born: January 10, 1975 (age 51) Denver, Colorado, U.S.
- Party: Democratic
- Education: Idaho State University (BS); University of Idaho, Boise (MS)
- Website: Campaign website

Mathew Erpelding (born January 10, 1975) is an American politician who served as a member of the Idaho House of Representatives from the from 2012 until 2019. Erpelding also served as House Minority Leader from January 2017 until his December 2019 resignation.

== Early life and education ==
Erpelding was born in Denver. From 1993 to 1997, Erpelding attended Idaho State University, in Pocatello, graduating with a BA in psychology. He later earned a master's degree in adult education and organizational learning from the University of Idaho.

== Career ==
Rep. Erpelding co-owns Idaho Mountain Guides serving as the head guide and instructor. Additionally, he teaches at Boise State University in the College of Innovation and Design as an adjunct instructor for the LEAD certification.

Prior to his election in 2012, Rep. Erpelding was a social and behavioral sciences instructor at the College of Western Idaho. An accomplished mountain guide, Erpelding has guided mountains across the western United States, most notably summiting Denali (20.310 ft) four times.

During the 2012 session of the Idaho Legislature, Erpelding served as an aide for Representative Brian Cronin (D-Boise). He has also been vice chair of the Ada County Democratic Party.

In 2003 Erpelding founded Experiential Adventures LLC, which offers "clients hands on leadership experience in fun and progressive learning environments."

In December 2019, Erpelding resigned from the Idaho House to take a position with the Boise Metro Chamber of Commerce.

In 2021, Erpelding joined Micron Technology as the director of state government and public affairs.

== Elections ==
Erpelding was elected as the Idaho House of Representatives Minority Leader by the House Democratic Caucus in December 2016.

2016

Erpelding was unopposed in the Democratic Primary. Erpelding defeated Republican Mark Patten with 68.75% of the vote.

2014

Erpelding was unopposed in the Democratic Primary. Erpelding defeated Republican Mitchell Berger with 71.6% of the vote.

2012

When Democratic Representative Cherie Buckner-Webb ran for Idaho Senate, Erpelding won the three-way May 15, 2012 Democratic Primary with 1,449 votes (48.0%).

Erpelding won the November 6, 2012 General election with 14,695 votes (66.7%) against Republican nominee Mike Washburn.

Idaho House of Representatives
Preceded by John Rusche	Minority Leader of the Idaho House of Representatives; 2017–2019	Succeeded by Ilana Rubel
