= Brian Cronin =

American politician from Idaho

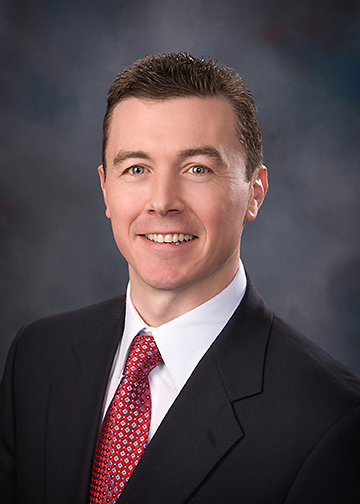

Member of the Idaho House of Representatives from District 19 Seat B
- In office December 1, 2008 – December 1, 2012
- Preceded by: Nicole LeFavour
- Succeeded by: Holli Woodings

Personal details
- Born: September 16, 1970 (age 56) New York City, New York, U.S.
- Party: Democratic
- Spouse: Verónica Franco
- Education: Haverford College; Harvard University
- Website: Campaign website

Brian C. Cronin (born September 16, 1970) served as Idaho State Representative for District 19's B seat from 2008 to 2012. District 19 includes downtown Boise, the North End, East End, Foothills, Warm Springs Mesa, Foothills and Highlands areas of Boise. In 2010, Cronin was chosen by fellow House Democrats as Minority Caucus Chairman.

== Early life and career ==
Cronin was born in New York City and attended elementary and junior high school in Ridgewood, New Jersey. In 1986, he moved to Idaho, where he graduated from high school. He earned a bachelor's degree in History at Haverford College in 1992. In 1995, he earned an Ed.M in Teaching and Curriculum from Harvard University. In between college and graduate school, Cronin worked in Ecuador as a WorldTeach volunteer, teaching English at the Universidad Técnica de Manabí in Portoviejo.

After returning to the United States, Cronin taught history at Scarsdale High School in Scarsdale, New York. He then served as communications director for Junior Chamber International in Miami before returning to Idaho in 1998. Cronin worked in a variety of marketing/communication roles for Hewlett-Packard and Wirestone before starting his own consulting firm in 2003.

== Personal ==
In 1996, Cronin married Verónica Franco Lopez. Verónica founded and directs the Garabatos Spanish Preschool in Boise. The couple has twin daughters, Kyra and Alana, born in 2002.

== Political career ==
In 2002, Cronin worked as press secretary for gubernatorial candidate Jerry Brady, who was defeated by Dirk Kempthorne. The following year, Cronin served as press secretary for State Representative Dave Bieter in his successful bid for Mayor of Boise. Cronin ran for office in 2004, for the Idaho House seat in District 19 that was vacated by longtime Representative Ken Robison. Cronin placed second in a three-way Democratic primary, losing to Nicole LeFavour.

In 2008, when Senator Mike Burkett retired and LeFavour ran for his Senate seat, Cronin ran again for state representative in District 19, defeating Republican Kevin McGowan. He was re-elected to a second term in 2010, defeating Republican John Magnan. In late 2010, House Democrats elected Cronin as their Minority Caucus Chairman.

Cronin, who serves on the Environment, Energy, & Technology Committee, graduated from the Legislative Energy Horizon Institute in 2010. The Institute, sponsored by the Pacific Northwest Economic Region (PNWER) and in partnership with the National Conference of State Legislatures (NCSL) and the U.S. Department of Energy, selects energy-minded legislators from both the U.S. and Canada to participate in an 18-month university certificate program in energy policy planning awarded through the University of Idaho.

In the 2011 legislative session, Cronin became known as the leading voice opposing Superintendent Tom Luna's "Students Come First" reform plan. Despite his fierce opposition, Cronin earned praise from Luna and House Education Committee Chairman Bob Nonini in an Idaho Statesman profile of Cronin.

Cronin's impassioned debate against the various pieces of legislation that Luna proposed was widely quoted throughout Idaho and around the country.

In the fall of 2011, Cronin was selected as a Rodel Fellow at the Aspen Institute. Each year, the Aspen Institute selects 24 “rising stars” in state or local government from around the nation for a two-year fellowship, designed to foster thoughtful leadership, bi-partisan collaboration, and new approaches to problem solving. Following the 2011 legislative session, Cronin was named an MVP by the Idaho Public Employees Association along with Senator Dean Cameron (R-Rupert). In November 2011, Cronin was recognized, together with Senator Denton Darrington (R-Declo), as an "Idaho Statesman of the Year" by the Pi Sigma Alpha political science honor society at Idaho State University. And in December 2011, New DEAL Leaders—a group of "pro-growth progressives" headed up by Maryland Governor Martin O'Malley and Senator Mark Begich (D-Alaska)--announced that Cronin was one of their honorees.

Cronin did not seek reelection to the Idaho Legislature in 2012. He was succeeded by fellow Democrat Holli High Woodings.

== Committee assignments ==
Cronin's committee assignments include:

- Business Committee
- Education Committee
- Environment/Energy/Technology Committee
- House Ways & Means Committee
- Idaho Commission on Hispanic Affairs
- Information Technology Resource Management Council
- Interim Energy Committee

== Awards ==
- Idaho Business Review’s “Accomplished Under 40,” 2008
- A+ Friend of Education Award, Idaho Education Association
- Food Producers of Idaho “Ag All-Star”

== Community involvement ==
- Commissioner, Idaho Commission on Hispanic Affairs
- Delegate, Idaho Human Rights Education Center mission to Jordan, 2009
- Vice President, Leadership Boise, Class of 2005-07
- Board Member, Boise State Public Radio Community Advisory Board
- Board Member, Idaho Human Rights Education Center
- Board Member, Boise Metro Chamber of Commerce’s Small Business Success Center
- Vice Chairman, Ada County Highway District Neighborhood Advisory Committee
- Chairman, Ada County Democrats (2005–2008)
- Volunteer: United Way Community Impact Review Team and Direct Impact Response Team
- Volunteer: Agency for New Americans
- Volunteer: Roosevelt Elementary School
- Member, Boise Metro Chamber of Commerce; Idaho Technology Council
