= Pat Bieter =

American politician (1930-1999)

Member of the Idaho House of Representatives from the 19th district
- In office 1996 – January 27, 1999
- Succeeded by: Dave Bieter

Personal details
- Born: John Patrick Bieter; March 13, 1930 Devils Lake, North Dakota, U.S.
- Died: January 27, 1999 (aged 68) Banks, Idaho, U.S.
- Party: Democratic
- Children: 5, including Dave
- Education: University of St. Thomas (BA); University of California, Berkeley (MA); University of Idaho (EdD)

John Patrick "Pat" Bieter (March 13, 1930 – January 27, 1999) was an American politician and educator. A member of the Democratic Party, Bieter served as a member of the Idaho House of Representatives from 1996 until his death in 1999.

Bieter, who married a woman of Basque descent, was noted for his involvement in Basque-American community affairs in Boise. Following his death in a car accident in 1999, he was succeeded by his son Dave Bieter, who went on to serve as the long-time mayor of Boise.

== Early life and education ==
Bieter was born on March 13, 1930, in Devils Lake, North Dakota. He earned a Bachelor of Arts in history from the University of St. Thomas, Master of Arts in history from the University of California, Berkeley, and Doctor of Education from the University of Idaho.

== Career ==
Bieter served in the United States Air Force and was stationed at the Mountain Home Air Force Base, where he met his wife. After studying at the University of California, Berkeley, Bieter returned to Idaho and began teaching at Boise Junior High School. He worked for an additional 12 years in the Boise School District, including as assistant principal of Borah High School.

Bieter became active in Boise, Idaho's Basque community and established the Basque studies program at Boise State University, taking 75 students, seven faculty, and his wife and five children to live in the Franco-era Basque Country for the 1974–75 academic year.

Bieter was elected to serve in the Idaho House of Representatives in 1996, representing the District 19, which consists of a portion of Ada County, Idaho. He was a Democrat.

== Personal life ==
Bieter married Eloise (née Garmendia), the daughter of immigrants from Basque Country, in 1955. They had five children, including Dave Bieter, who succeeded Pat in the Idaho House of Representatives and served as the 55th Mayor of Boise from 2004 to 2020.

=== Death ===
Bieter and his wife died on January 27, 1999, near Banks, Idaho, in a car accident.
