= 2019 Boise mayoral election =

- November 5, 2019 and December 3, 2019
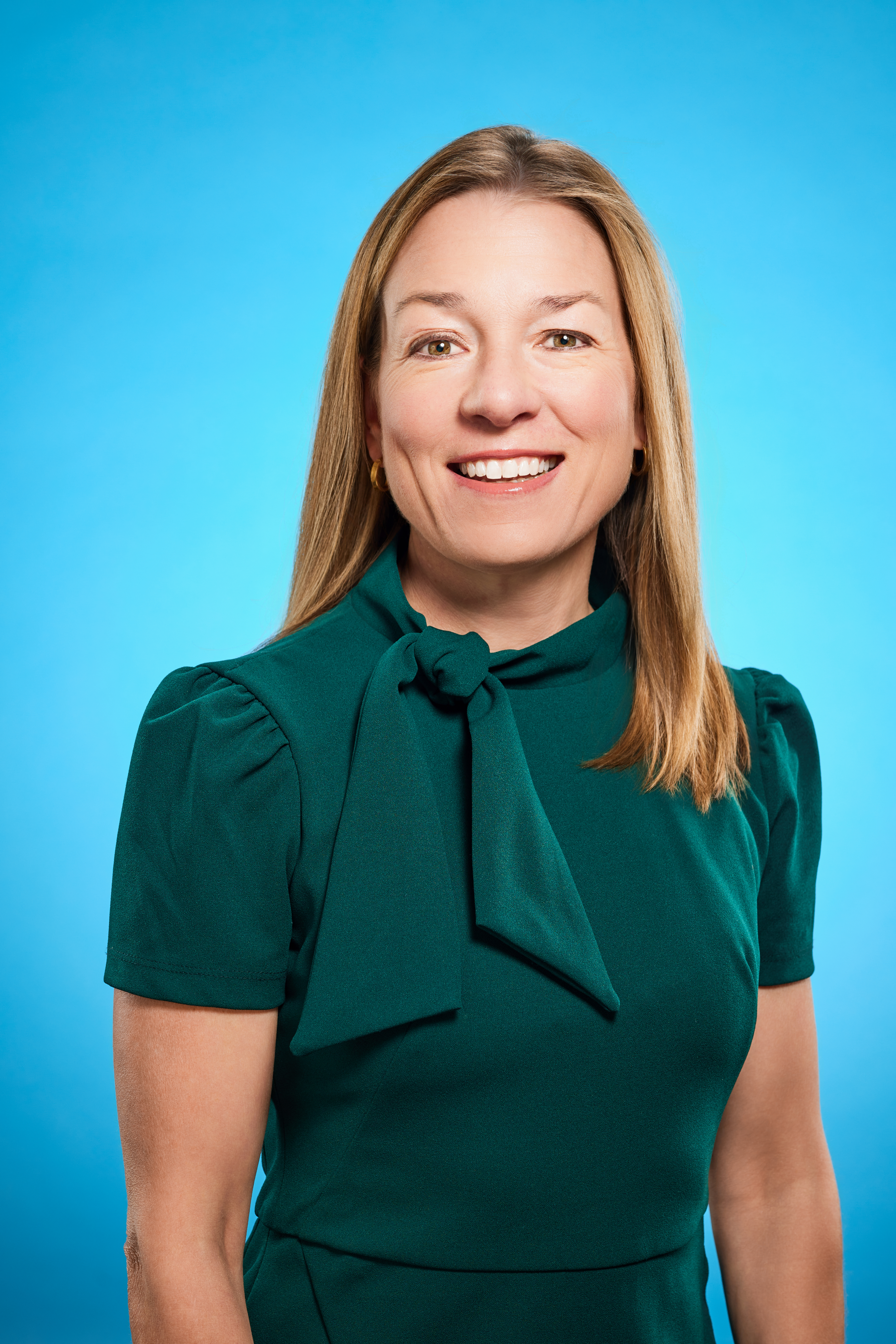

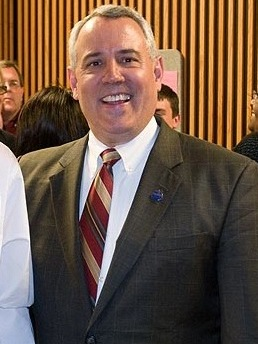
Candidate	Lauren McLean	Dave Bieter
Party	Nonpartisan	Nonpartisan
First round	23,669; 45.7%	15,711; 30.3%
Second round	30,306; 65.5%	15,998; 34.5%
Candidate	Rebecca Arnold	H. Brent Coles
Party	Nonpartisan	Nonpartisan
First round	6,863; 13.2%	3,804; 7.3%
Second round	Eliminated	Eliminated
Mayor before election
Dave Bieter
Democratic
Elected Mayor
Lauren McLean
Democratic

The 2019 Boise mayoral election was held on November 5, 2019, to determine the mayor of Boise, Idaho. The election was officially nonpartisan. The election was won by Boise City Council the president Lauren McLean, who defeated the incumbent mayor Dave Bieter in a runoff election held on December 3, 2019.

== Background ==
In the 2019 Boise mayoral election, incumbent mayor Dave Bieter sought a fifth term. He had won re-election four years earlier with a 40-point lead over his closest challenger, Judy Peavey-Derr.

During his fourth term, Bieter faced controversy, in particular opposition to his plan to build a $100 million library. Former mayor and future candidate H. Brent Coles, at a city council meeting, argued the money should be spent instead on police and fire stations.

Ada County Clerk Phil McGrane refused to place the issue on the 2019 ballot, and stated that he would change his mind only in the event of a challenge in court. Bieter declined to mount a legal challenge, in part because initial cost estimates were far lower than subsequent estimates. In a statement, Bieter wrote that he "believe(s) a new Main Library is vital to the future of our city and (he) will remain dedicated to making sure we have one [...] However, with little time before ballots must be printed, and to avoid further confusion among residents, a court action simply isn’t viable at this time."

== Candidates ==
- Rebecca Arnold, Ada County Highway District president
- Dave Bieter, the incumbent mayor since 2004, ran for his fifth term. Bieter is a member of the Democratic Party.
- H. Brent Coles, former mayor of Boise who resigned after accepting a trip to the 2002 Winter Olympics from an insurance company
- Adriel Martinez, former Boise City Council candidate
- Lauren McLean, Boise City Council president, ran in what the Idaho Statesman called "a direct challenge" to Bieter's attempt at a fifth term.
- Cortney Nielsen, a representative for Acosta Sales & Marketing

== General election ==
As Boise's mayoral elections are nonpartisan, neither party nominated a candidate. A total of seven candidates appeared on the ballot.

The race featured two candidates who had been mayors of Boise: the incumbent mayor, and 1993-2003 mayor Brent Coles. Incumbent mayor Bieter emphasized that his goals for a fifth term included ensuring access to affordable housing, making Boise carbon-neutral by 2035, and building the new library, while "making sure the project is completed within the budget set by the city". Coles was appointed mayor in 1993 then twice won re-election, but was removed from office in 2003 when he, as well as his chief of staff and the city human resources director, pleaded guilty in 2003 to misusing public funds. Coles campaigned on his record as mayor, including the consolidation of the city's transport system and his expansion of the police department. He also vowed to "re-prioritize public safety and neighborhoods and curb the growth in city spending".

City Council President Lauren McLean campaigned on affordable housing, improved transit conditions, and transparency in local government. She received the endorsement of Planned Parenthood. McLean argued that discouraging sprawl is the most effective way to address the influx of newcomers to the city. She also refused to accept funds from corporations for her campaign, although she did receive donations from business people.

Candidate Rebecca Arnold, the three-times-elected President of the Ada County Highway District, described herself as a "fiscal conservative" and was openly critical of Mayor Bieter, arguing that he had displayed an "inability to work with other agencies, such as ACHD and the legislature". She also argued property tax increases were excessive, and that the city was spending money on a number of "vanity projects". Wayne Richey, an auto mechanic, campaigned on a platform of discouraging Californians from migrating to Boise. He argued that they were changing the culture of the city, expected too many "amenities", and drove up housing prices. He mounted his campaign at the behest of former Idaho Senator Larry Craig, his neighbor. Cortney Nielsen argued that the city's wages were too low, and also promised to "advocate for a statewide emissions test to clean our air".

Bieter and McLean each raised more than $200,000 for their campaigns. Boise State Public Radio described the race as much closer than usual, and quoted College of Idaho professor Jasper LiCalzi, who argued that the candidates defied the typical categorization of "a typical Republican and a typical Democrat and a few fringe people", positing that there were "three significant campaigns" vying for votes, which made a runoff election, in the event that no candidate yields more than 50 percent of the vote, more likely than usual.

Bieter and McLean advanced to a runoff mayoral election, the first in Boise since 1965, when Jay S. Amyx defeated Eugene W. Shellworth. In 2006, the city abolished runoff elections for City Council seats, but maintained runoff elections for mayoral races.

McLean won the runoff by a landslide, defeating Bieter by over 31%.

== Results ==
2019 Boise mayoral election results
Party	Candidate	Votes	%
Nonpartisan	Lauren McLean	23,669	45.7%
Nonpartisan	Dave Bieter (incumbent)	15,711	30.3%
Nonpartisan	Rebecca Arnold	6,863	13.2%
Nonpartisan	H. Brent Coles	3,804	7.3%
Nonpartisan	Wayne Richey	847	1.6%
Nonpartisan	Adriel Martinez	588	1.1%
Nonpartisan	Cortney Nielsen	360	0.7%
Total votes		53,303	100%

2019 Boise mayoral runoff election
Party	Candidate	Votes	%
Nonpartisan	Lauren McLean	30,306	65.5
Nonpartisan	Dave Bieter (incumbent)	15,998	34.5
Total votes		46,304	100%
