= Idaho Black History Museum =

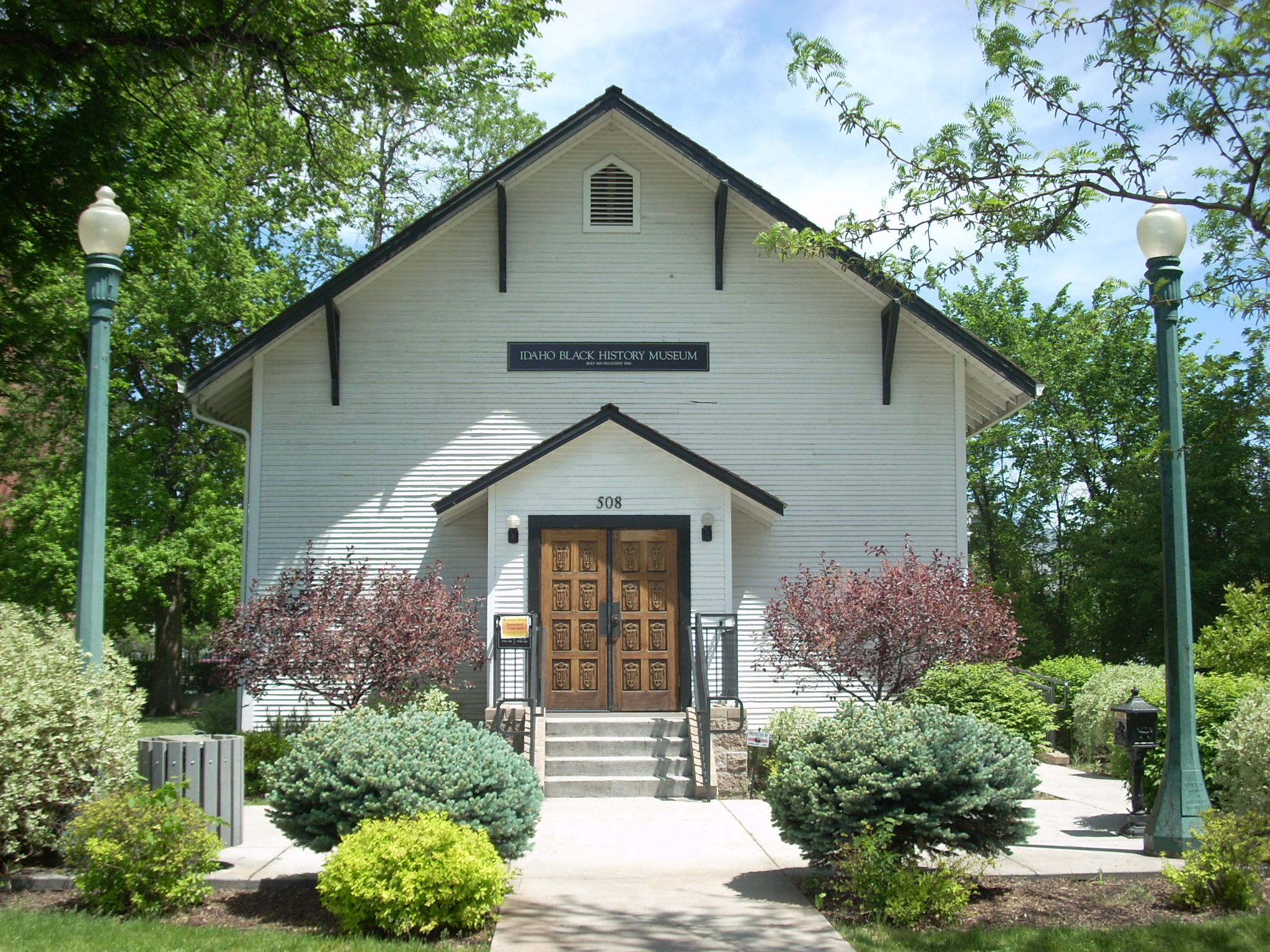
The Idaho Black History Museum building

The Idaho Black History Museum is a museum of African American history and culture located at 508 Julia Davis Drive in Boise, Idaho, in the United States. It is the oldest African American museum in the Pacific Northwest.

== About the building ==
St. Paul Baptist Church was constructed in 1921. The original location was at the corner of Warm Springs and Broadway Avenues. The congregation, founded in 1909 by Rev. William Riley Hardy, worshipped in homes and rented structures until the permanent church building was finished. Small, wood-frame chapel was included on the National Register of Historic Places in 1982. It was the first African American church in Idaho, and for almost all its history was the largest Black congregation in Idaho.

Having outgrown the building, the congregation resolved in 1994 to sell it to the city for use as a Black history museum. The congregation worshipped in the structure until 1995.

== About the museum ==
Preserving St. Paul Baptist Church was a major goal of Mary Hardy Buckner, a long-time member of the congregation. She encouraged her daughter, Cherie Buckner-Webb, to find a way to avoid its demolition. Buckner-Webb established a foundation in 1996 to take ownership of the church building, but this required moving it from the land on which it sat. The group raised $120,000 to move the structure and establish a museum in it once it reached its new location. The city of Boise agreed to allow the building to be moved to a spot on the outskirts of Julia Davis Park. The building was relocated in 1998. Local artist Cherie Lindley conserved the building's original eight stained glass windows prior to the museum's opening.

The museum dates its founding to 1995, making it the oldest African American history museum in the Pacific Northwest, but did not open its doors until 1999.

The Idaho Black History Museum focuses on African Americans in Idaho from the early 1800s to the present. The museum's permanent display, "The Invisible Idahoan: 200 Years of Blacks in Idaho", was created with the assistance of Dr. Mamie Oliver, the first African American professor at Boise State University. Other exhibits contain artifacts and displays on Aurelius Buckner, the first Black athlete at Boise State University; Dorothy Buckner, African American activist who succeeded in pushing the Idaho legislation to adopt a civil rights bill in 1961; Cherie Buckner-Webb, the first Black legislator in the state of Idaho, and the history of the Ku Klux Klan's attempts to intimidate African Americans in the state. The museum's collection also included a sizeable number of works of African American art. The museum's programming includes films, lectures, films, performances, and workshops.

The museum's currect executive director is Phillip Thompson, Mary Hardy Buckner's great-grandson. The museum suffered a significant financial crisis in 2007 that required it to lay off staff and reduce its hours In 2016, the museum was vandalized when someone wrote a racial slur in the snow on the roof of the museum's storage facility.
