= Nicole LeFavour =

American politician from Idaho

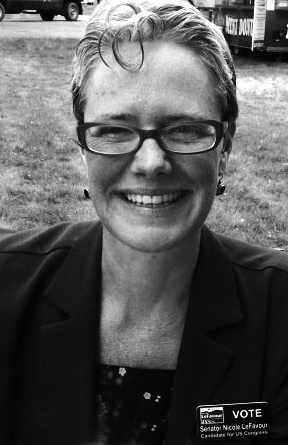

Member of the Idaho Senate from District 19
- In office December 1, 2008 – December 1, 2012
- Preceded by: Mike Burkett
- Succeeded by: Cherie Buckner-Webb

Member of the Idaho House of Representatives from District 19 Seat B
- In office December 1, 2004 – December 1, 2008
- Preceded by: Ken Robison
- Succeeded by: Brian Cronin

Personal details
- Born: February 8, 1964 (age 62) Colorado
- Party: Democratic
- Education: University of California, Berkeley; University of Montana-Missoula; San Francisco State University
- Profession: Public school teacher
- Website: 4idaho.org

Nicole LeFavour (born February 8, 1964) is an American politician and educator from Idaho who served as an Idaho State Senator from 2008 to 2012. LeFavour had previously served in the Idaho House of Representatives from 2004 to 2008.

== Early life, education, and early career ==
Nicole LeFavour was born in Colorado to Pat and Bruce LeFavour. They grew up in Central Idaho in Custer County, near the Frank Church Wilderness where they later worked. LeFavour received a bachelor's degree in cognitive science from the University of California, Berkeley, and a Master's of Fine Arts in writing from the University of Montana-Missoula. In 2010, LeFavour completed Harvard University's John F. Kennedy School of Government program for Senior Executives in State and Local Government as a David Bohnett LGBTQ Victory Institute Leadership Fellow. They moved to Boise in 1990.

LeFavour taught at the University of Montana from 1989–1990. They worked for the Snake River Alliance from 1992–1994. In 1996, LeFavour taught at the Fort Boise School. A news reporter for the Boise Weekly from 1997–1998, LeFavour was a board member for the Ada County Human Rights Task Force from 1999–2002. They were also a board member of the Choices in Community Giving from 2000–2002 and the Western States Center from 2002–2005. LeFavour worked for the Idaho Center on Budget & Tax Policy from 2000–2004.

LeFavour owned a small business, LeFavour Graphic Design, from 2000 to 2005, and has taught writing at The Cabin Literary Center for more than a decade and at the Writers at Harriman program for the past four years. In 2004, they were a lobbyist for the Idaho Community Action Network. In 2007, LeFavour was a delegate for the Idaho Human Rights Education Center's 2007 European Human Rights Mission.

== Idaho House of Representatives (2004-2008) ==
=== Elections ===
In 2004, incumbent Democratic State Representative Ken Robison of Idaho's 19B House District decided to retire. LeFavour decided to run in the 19th district, which was placed in parts of the city of Boise. They won the three-way Democratic primary with 2,163 votes (54.55%) and won the general election with 13,350 votes (67.2%). In 2006, LeFavour ran unopposed and won re-election to a second term with 14,217 votes.

=== Tenure ===
In 2006, LeFavour criticized the passage of Idaho Amendment 2, which made it unconstitutional for Idaho to recognize or perform same-sex marriages or civil unions.

They heavily criticized many of the state's budgets which in their view cut taxes and spending too much, thus eliminating thousands of jobs. In 2007, LeFavour was named "Idaho Business Review Women of the Year".

They fought to reduce prison population by improving the state's substance abuse and mental health programs. In 2008, LeFavour was named "Legislator of the Year" by the Idaho State Planning Council on Mental Health.

=== Committee assignments ===
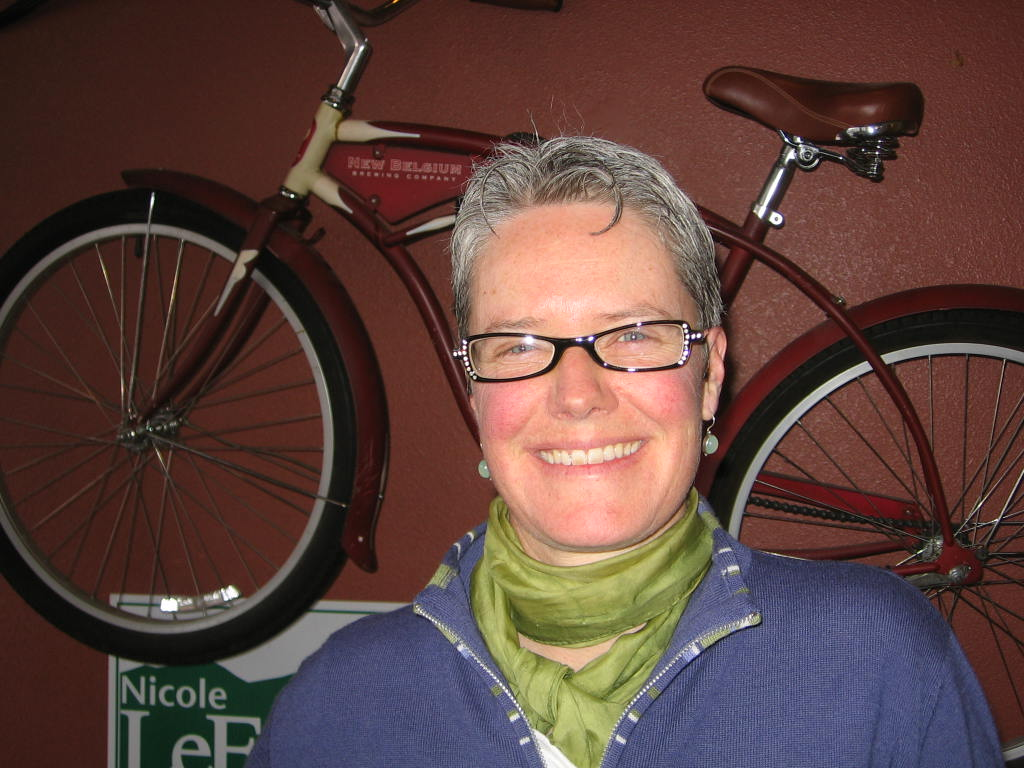
LeFavour is a strong proponent of bicycling infrastructure

- Environment, Energy and Technology
- Judiciary, Rules and Administration
- Revenue and Taxation

== Idaho Senate (2008–2012) ==
=== Elections ===
LeFavour announced in March 2008 they would retire from the Idaho House to run for the 19th Senate District, seeking the seat being vacated by retiring Democratic State Senator F. Michael Burkett. In the general election, LeFavour defeated Chuck Meissner with 15,163 votes (71.3%). In 2010, LeFavour was re-elected to a second term with 10,246 votes (68.8%).

=== Tenure ===
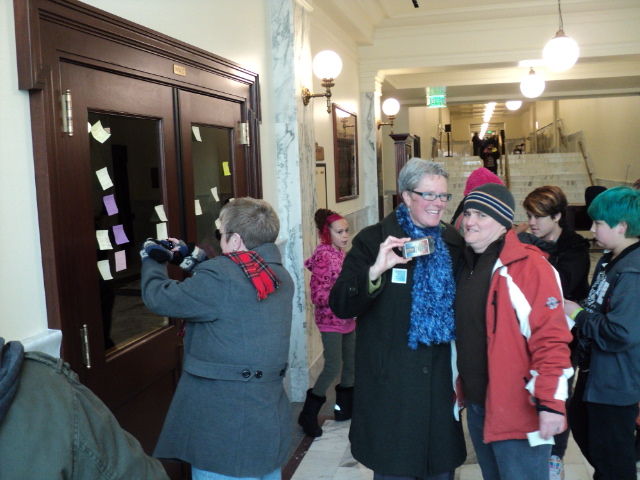
At a demonstration inside the Statehouse to add the words "sexual orientation" and "gender identity" to Idaho's civil rights statutes .

LeFavour was extremely active in Idaho's Add The Words campaign. LeFavour proposed amending Idaho's Human Rights Act to cover discrimination on the basis of sexual orientation and gender identity. In 2012 the Add the Words bill ultimately did not make it out of committee.

Twice elected to the Legislative Council by their peers, LeFavour was an advocate for increased spending in Idaho schools and access to mental health/substance abuse treatment programs.

=== Committee assignments ===
LeFavour's past committee assignments were:

- Education
- Judiciary and Rules
- Joint Finance and Appropriations Committee.

== 2012 congressional election ==
In February 2012, LeFavour announced that they would not be seeking re-election to the state legislature, but announced their candidacy for the United States Congress in Idaho's 2nd District the following month. They challenged seven-term Republican U.S. Congressman Mike Simpson, whom they debated twice and criticized as being only superficially moderate, citing his vote against discrimination protections for women in the workplace. Had LeFavour been elected, they would have been the second openly lesbian member of the U.S. Congress, but polled 34.8% of the vote. This was in and of itself the strongest showing of any Democratic candidate against Mike Simpson as an incumbent: Craig Williams got 25.9% of the vote in 2000, Edward Kinghorn 29.0% in 2002, Lin Witworth 29.3% in 2004, Jim D. Hansen 34.43% in 2006, Deborah Holmes 31% in 2008, and Mike Crawford 24.4% in 2010. LeFavour noted after the election on the campaign's Facebook page that, as a candidate, they had received the most votes in eastern Idaho of any Democrat who had run against Simpson as an incumbent, and that "last but not least, we've put to rest the question of whether Idahoans will actually vote for a gay person."

== Continuing advocacy ==
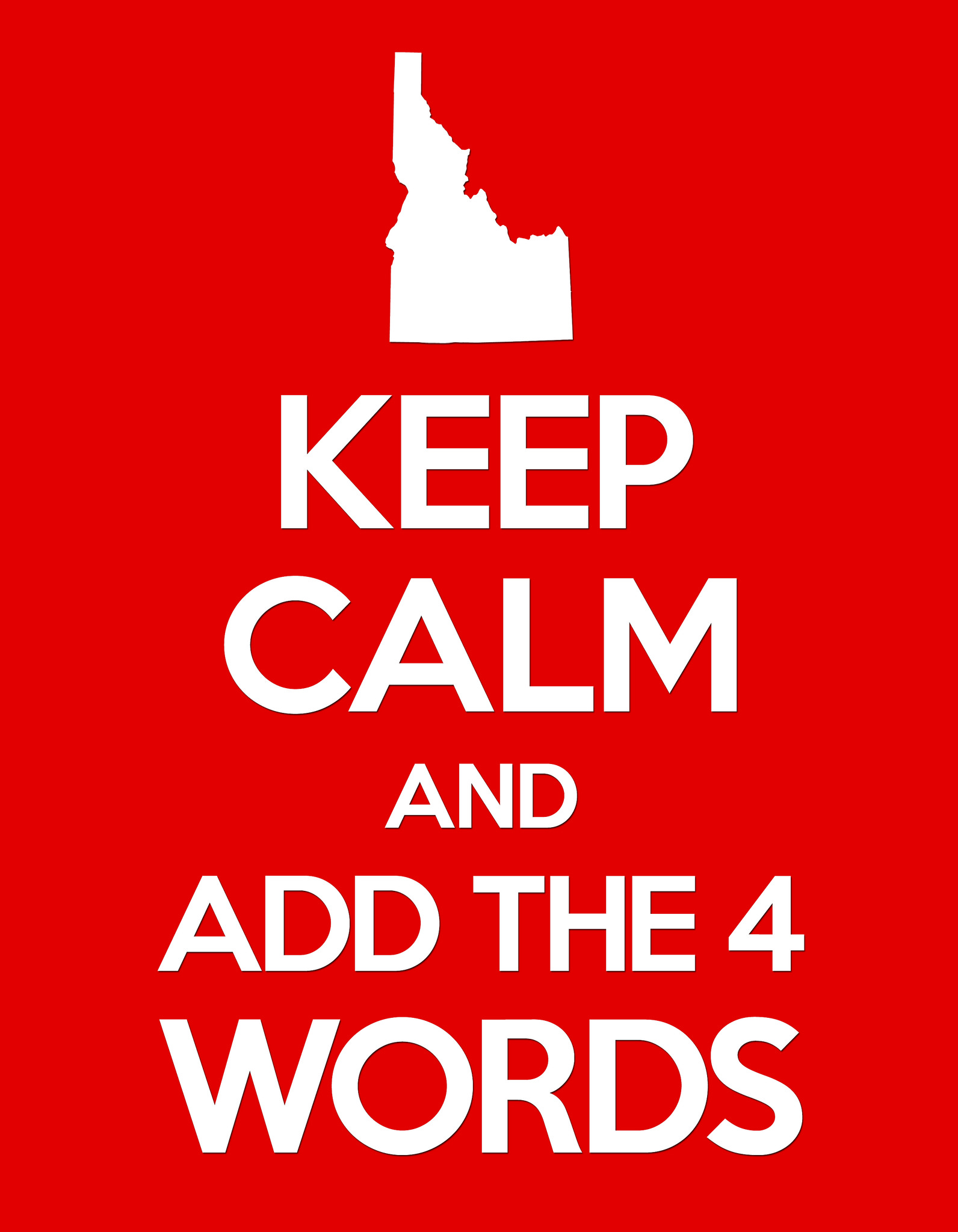
A co-optation of the Keep Calm and Carry On meme on behalf of the LGBT Add The Words, Idaho human rights campaign

After their service as a public representative, LeFavour has remained active in LGBTQ affairs. They were one of 44 activists arrested on February 3, 2014, at the Statehouse on suspicion of misdemeanor trespassing, having blocked the Idaho Senate's entrances for more than two hours in a silent protest two months in the planning on behalf of the Add The Words campaign, an act of civil disobedience which they had organized. Three of those arrested were juveniles, and LeFavour was, unexpectedly, the last person to be arrested after the Idaho Senate voted to suspend its rule which allows former members to be on the Senate floor.

By the end of February, following other protests, 122 arrests had been conducted (with some protestors being arrested for than once, and all of whom are being represented pro bono), and negotiations between LGBT-rights advocates and religiously conservative legislators had tentatively begun. By early March, LeFavour had been arrested four times in five weeks, and in mid-March, was discovered in an act of political theater during a direct action protest after having literally hid in a closet in the Idaho Senate lounge for hours. Ultimately LeFavour has been arrested ten times; at a court hearing in late July 2014 LeFavour took a plea deal and was sentenced to seventy hours of community service and fined $70 plus additional court costs.

== Awards ==
- 1997 Idaho Press Club Award for their story Where Have You Gone, Joe Albertson
- 2001 United Nations Human Rights Day Award, Idaho Voices of Faith for Human Rights
- 2001 Women Making History Award, Boise State University Women's Center
- 2004 Grassroots Leader of the Year, United Vision for Idaho
- 2007 Women of the Year Award, Idaho Business Review
- 2008 Legislator of the Year, Idaho State Planning Council on Mental Health

== Personal life ==
LeFavour's partner of more than a decade, Carol Growhoski, was in the later years of LeFavour's service in the legislature invited to participate in the "Legisladies," a social organization of female legislative spouses. (The two had married in Idaho's Custer County in July 2017, and had previously been civil unioned in Vermont in 2006). LeFavour was the first ever openly gay member of the Idaho Legislature; their election campaigns have won the backing of the Gay & Lesbian Victory Fund. They made a personal "It Gets Better" video, in which they noted,

When I first walked into this building [the Idaho Statehouse] fifteen years ago to talk to lawmakers about what it was like to be a gay person in Idaho, many didn't think they had ever met anyone gay; sadly, some were cruel... Today, I serve in the Senate next to some of the same people and some have changed... Together, with time, you and I and this world we live in, will work together to make sure it gets better.

LeFavour is featured in the documentaries Breaking Through (2013) and Add the Words (2014).

In April 2013 they were denied unemployment benefits, inasmuch as elected officials are not eligible.

LeFavour's papers have been collected in Boise State University's Special Collections archives. Audio and video interviews are collected at Boise State University, the Idaho State Historical Society, and the Outwords Archive.
