= 2011 Boise mayoral election =

- November 8, 2011
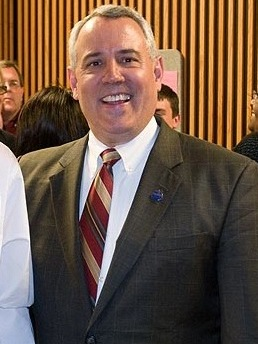

| Candidate | Dave Bieter | David B. Hall |
| Party | Nonpartisan | Nonpartisan |
| Popular vote | 12,640 | 4,377 |
| Percentage | 74.28% | 25.72% |
Mayor before election
Dave Bieter
Nonpartisan
Elected Mayor
Dave Bieter
Nonpartisan

The 2011 Boise mayoral election took place on November 8, 2011. Incumbent Mayor Dave Bieter ran for re-election to a third term. In a year of low contestation for municipal elections, Bieter's only opponent was David Hall, a college student at the College of Western Idaho. Bieter easily won re-election, receiving 74 percent of the vote to Hall's 26 percent.

== General election ==
=== Candidates ===
- Dave Bieter, incumbent Mayor
- David B. Hall, College of Western Idaho student

=== Results ===
2011 Boise mayoral election results
| Party | Candidate | Votes | % |
|---|---|---|---|
| Nonpartisan | Dave Bieter (inc.) | 12,640 | 74.28% |
| Nonpartisan | David B. Hall | 4,377 | 25.72% |
| Total votes | | 17,017 | 100.00% |
