= 2001 Boise mayoral election =

Mayoral election in Boise, Idaho

- November 6, 2001
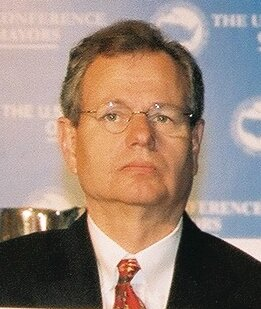

Candidate	Brent Coles	Rod Beck
Party	Nonpartisan	Nonpartisan
Popular vote	17,739	9,052
Percentage	53.07%	27.08%
Mayor before election
Brent Coles
Nonpartisan
Elected mayor
Brent Coles
Nonpartisan

The 2001 Boise mayoral election was held on November 6, 2001, to elect the mayor of Boise, Idaho. Incumbent Mayor Brent Coles ran for re-election to a third term. He was challenged by six opponents, including former State Senator Rod Beck.

On May 23, 2001, city voters approved a $10 million levy to purchase and preserve land in the Boise foothills, which Coles championed, by a wide margin. Beck was one of the leading opponents of the levy, and focused his mayoral campaign around a fiscally conservative, pro-business agenda.

Coles ultimately won re-election by a wide margin, receiving 53 percent of the vote to Coles's 27 percent.

However, Coles did not end up serving out his full term as Mayor. On February 15, 2003, after he was charged with two misdemeanors for accepting free travel from Blue Cross of Idaho to the 2002 Winter Olympics, he resigned from office.

== General election ==
=== Candidates ===
- Brent Coles, incumbent Mayor
- Rod Beck, former State Senator, anti-preservation levy activist
- Jeremy Maxand, activist, executive director of the Idaho Media Project
- Jane C. Reiser, attorney
- Ron Dillon, bicycle race promoter, event coordinator
- Harley D. Brown, perennial candidate
- Gene Summa, forklift operator, 2000 Republican candidate for Congress

=== Results ===
2001 Boise mayoral election
Party	Candidate	Votes	%
Nonpartisan	Brent Coles (inc.)	17,739	53.07%
Nonpartisan	Rod Beck	9,052	27.08%
Nonpartisan	Jeremy Maxand	2,545	7.61%
Nonpartisan	Jane C. Reiser	1,503	4.50%
Nonpartisan	Rod Dillon	1,122	3.36%
Nonpartisan	Harley D. Brown	964	2.88%
Nonpartisan	Gene Summa	502	1.50%
Total votes		33,427	100.00%
