= Cherie Buckner-Webb =

American politician

Member of the Idaho Senate from District 19
- In office December 1, 2012 – November 30, 2020
- Preceded by: Nicole LeFavour
- Succeeded by: Melissa Wintrow

Member of the Idaho House of Representatives from District 19 Seat A
- In office December 1, 2010 – November 30, 2012
- Preceded by: Anne Pasley-Stuart
- Succeeded by: Mat Erpelding

Personal details
- Born: October 20, 1951 (age 74) Boise, Idaho, U.S.
- Party: Democratic
- Education: George Fox University; Northwest Nazarene University
- Website: Campaign website

Cherie Buckner-Webb (born October 29, 1951) is a Democratic politician from Boise, Idaho. In 2010 Buckner-Webb was elected to a single term in the Idaho House of Representatives representing the north Boise-based District 19. In 2012 Buckner-Webb won the district's Idaho Senate seat, succeeding the retiring Nicole LeFavour. She is Idaho's first elected African-American state legislator, and its first African-American woman legislator.

Upon taking office in the Idaho Senate Buckner-Webb was elected Democratic caucus chair, and she later served as assistant minority leader.

Buckner-Webb did not seek re-election in 2020. Buckner-Webb instead ran for College of Western Idaho Zone 5 Trustee and won unopposed.

== Early life and career ==
Buckner-Webb earned her bachelor's degree from George Fox University and her master's degree in social work from Northwest Nazarene University. Buckner-Webb made state history when she won the November 2, 2010 general election with 10,196 votes (68.4%) against Jim Morland, becoming Idaho's first elected African American state legislator, and its first African American woman legislator.

In July of 2021 a park in downtown Boise was constructed and named in her honor due to her work in creating the Idaho Black History Museum. The name was selected through a public engagement process and was unanimously approved by the city council.

== Elections ==
District 19 House Seat A - Part of Ada County
Year	Candidate	Votes	Pct	Candidate	Votes	Pct	Candidate	Votes	Pct
2010 Primary	Cherie Buckner-Webb	2,158	78.4%	David Cadwell	564	20.5%	Dallas Gudgell	29	1.1%
2010 General	Cherie Buckner-Webb	10,196	68.4%	Jim Morland	4,716	31.6%			

District 19 Senate - Part of Ada County
Year	Candidate	Votes	Pct	Candidate	Votes	Pct
2012 Primary	Cherie Buckner-Webb	2,873	100%			
2012 General	Cherie Buckner-Webb	15,778	70.0%	Paul O'Leary	6,755	30.0%
2014 Primary	Cherie Buckner-Webb (incumbent)	2,795	100%			
2014 General	Cherie Buckner-Webb (incumbent)	13,240	74.0%	Tony Snesko	4,659	26.0%
2016 Primary	Cherie Buckner-Webb (incumbent)	2,923	100.0%			
2016 General	Cherie Buckner-Webb (incumbent)	19,679	100%			
