= Lauren McLean =

Mayor of Boise, Idaho (born 1974)

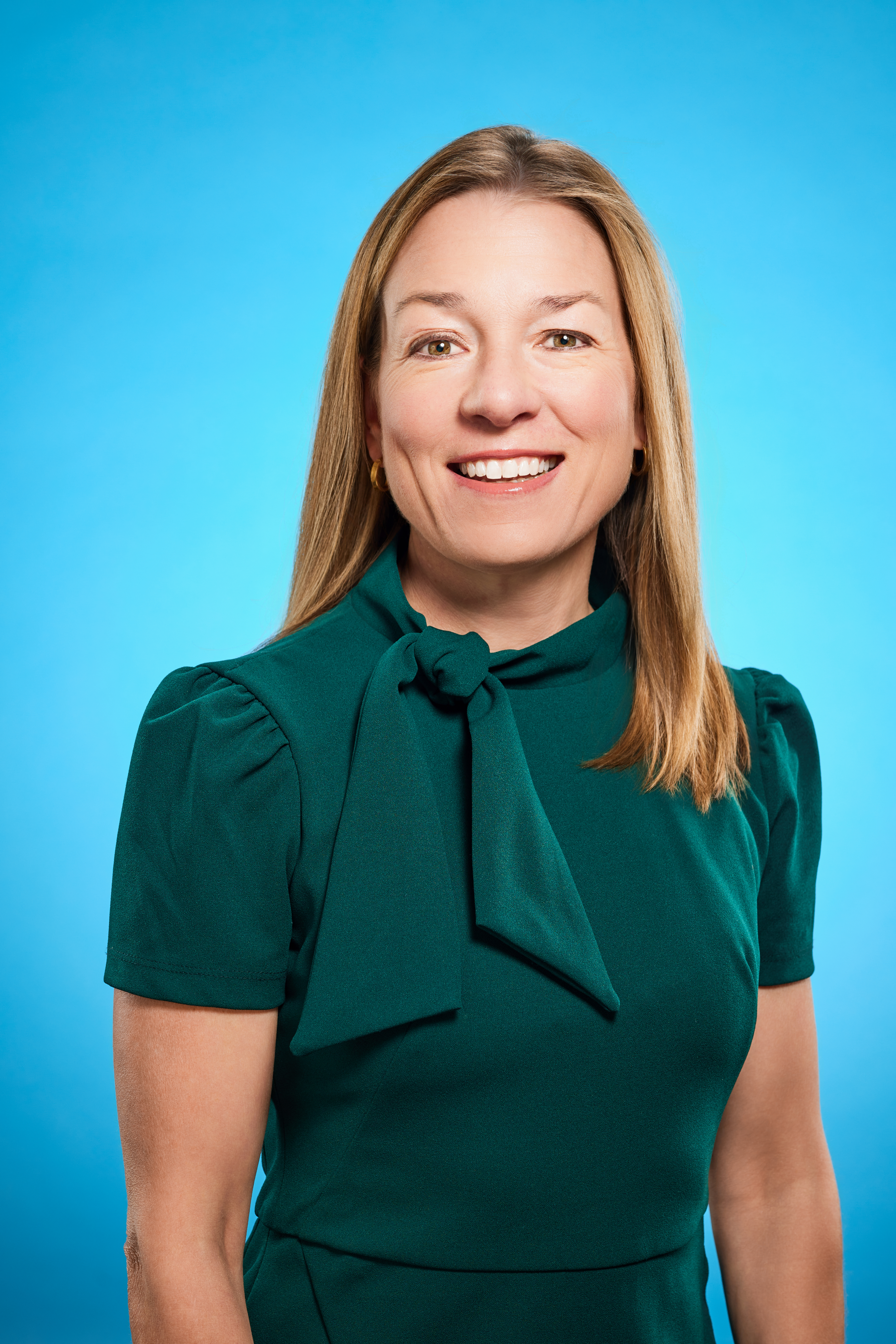

56th Mayor of Boise
- Incumbent
- Assumed office January 7, 2020
- Preceded by: Dave Bieter

Personal details
- Born: Lauren Stein; October 20, 1974 (age 51) Boston, Massachusetts, U.S.
- Party: Democratic
- Education: University of Notre Dame (BA); Boise State University (MPA)
- Website: Mayor's Office

Lauren Stein McLean (born October 20, 1974) is an American politician and entrepreneur currently serving as the mayor of Boise, Idaho. McLean was elected in the 2019 mayoral election, defeating incumbent mayor Dave Bieter. She assumed office on January 7, 2020.

McLean is a member of the Democratic Party.

== Early life ==
Lauren McLean was born in Boston, Massachusetts. She lived in Houston, Texas and Cazenovia, New York, before moving to Boise, Idaho in 1998. McLean married her high school sweetheart, Scott, and they have two children.

== Education and early career ==
Mayor McLean graduated with honors from the University of Notre Dame in 1997. In 2001, She received her MPA from Boise State University. McLean led the successful Boise Foothills Open Space Levy campaign in 2001 as well. She then served on the Boise City Council from 2011 to 2019, and served as the Council President from 2017 to 2019. In 2019, Lauren McLean was elected as the 56th mayor of Boise, becoming the first woman to hold this position.

== Career ==
McLean serves on the board of governors of the Andrus Center for Public Policy at Boise State University. She is also a member of the Boise City Planning and Zoning Association and Boise Parks Commission.

== Policies ==
=== Housing ===
In response to the 2024 Supreme Court decision in City of Grants Pass v. Johnson, which would allow cities to ban homeless individuals from sleeping outdoors, McLean said that she does not want to criminalize people for having financial hardships. She plans to invest in permanent supportive housing around the city, providing supportive services such as mental health counseling, health care, and substance assistance. In her second term she will continue to build 1,250 units of affordable housing.

During her time in office, she has assisted in receiving grants for the city to combat teen homelessness. The city was awarded $3.2 million and the state was awarded $3.8 million that they plan to use to provide a roof over everyone's head. She is working alongside Andrew Lofton, who is the Housing and Urban Development Northwest Regional Administrator to create plans on how to combat the increase of population. In 2021, citizens protested when McLean supported the sale of the Murgoitio park to use for the creation for more housing units. This sale did not end up occurring because it was more costly than expected.

=== Parks and recreation ===
During McLean’s time in office she has focused on creating more parks for the community. In June 2024, under her administration the 1.5 acre Primrose Park opened. One of her goals is to have a park less than a ten-minute walk from every Boise resident, as of October 2024, this applied to 73% of residents.

=== Climate change ===
McLean led the Boise Foothills Open Space Levy campaign. While McLean was on the City Council, she was an advocate for Boise to pass the 100% Clean Energy Plan. McLean announced the formation of a Climate Action Division, which intends to ensure Boise is climate proficient and that the state can mitigate climate-related economic issues. This division plans to gather feedback from residents and businesses on their climate priorities. McLean plans to make Boise city government carbon-neutral by 2035.

=== Police ===
As mayor of Boise, Lauren McLean requested the Police department head, Ryan Lee, her appointee, to resign following months of internal scandal within BPD and the mayor's office. She learned of problems officers had with Lee through officers sending reviews to HR. Issues of name-calling and allegations of verbal abuse by Lee led many officers to retire early. She discussed how having a clear place for officers to bring their complaints is necessary. She stated that she knew of these issues and had a third party to come and review the complaints. She received the information from the third party and found that no laws were broken; however, systematic issues needed to be addressed. The third-party requested McLean put Lee on paid leave, which McLean did not do. She explained that since it was an investigation and not a charge, she chose not to place him on leave. Once this information became public, she decided it was in the department's best interest to let Lee go.

In August 2024, McLean selected Chris Dennison, the assistant chief of Tucson, Arizona, to lead the police department in Boise. She stated that her decision was based on Dennison's understanding of trust between police and the community it serves.

=== Abortion ===
In June 2022, the Supreme Court of the United States ruling Dobbs v. Jackson Women's Health Organization made the 5–4 decision that there is no constitutional right to protect abortion federally, which resulted in the ending of federal protection of abortion up to 24 weeks into pregnancy leaving the decision up to each individual state. In the wake of that decision, in June 2022, the Idaho Supreme Court declared that abortion be considered illegal six weeks after the conception date and included exceptions for rape, incest, and medical emergencies. These bans also included criminal penalties for violations of these laws and an allowed legal compensation from suing medical providers in civil court if a performed abortion occurred after said six weeks.

While not able to change policies regarding abortion in the city of Boise, McLean expressed disapproval of these decisions made by both the Supreme Court of the United States and the Supreme Court of Idaho, claiming that these restrictions hurt minority and low-income women. In July 2022, McLean proposed a resolution to the Boise City Council to limit public safety resources going into investigating doctors who perform abortions and individuals who receive that healthcare, unless the pregnancy was caused in response to force implicated on the impregnated individual. The resolution was adopted in a 3–2 vote.

=== 2025 fiscal year budget ===
Overall, with the total budget coming out to $877.0 million, Mayor McLean claimed that the FY 2025 budget reflected the dilemma she faced with rising costs within the city government and taxes while trying to maintain relief for residents. McLean proposed a 3% property tax increase, and public reaction was mixed regarding rising property taxes.

== Elections ==
=== 2019 election ===
McLean was a candidate in the 2019 Boise mayoral election, running against incumbent Dave Bieter, former mayor H. Brent Coles, and others. Since neither Bieter nor McLean had surpassed the 50 percent vote threshold required to claim victory, the two competed in a runoff election held on December 3, 2019. McLean won with 65.5 percent of the vote to Bieter's 34.5 percent. The mayor's office is a nonpartisan position, though McLean is a registered Democrat.

McLean is the first woman elected to the office, and the second to serve as Boise mayor after Carolyn Terteling-Payne, who served briefly on an interim basis from 2003 to 2004. McLean was inaugurated on January 7, 2020.

=== 2023 election ===
McLean ran for reelection in 2023, during which she was the incumbent candidate for mayor. As the incumbent candidate, she had a name-recognition advantage for voters. She ran against former Boise police chief for ten years Mike Masterson. She also had very powerful donors raising over $388,000 for her campaign. McLean had about 55,000 donors with the majority of them being a slate of developers, labor unions and other prominent Democrats. During her campaign, she was also endorsed by Alicia Cassarino, the granddaughter of Boise's first-ever mayor. Other support came from the members of city council; two members backed her for mayor. McLean had received more votes for herself in 2023 than she did in 2019, by over 10,000 and 3,000 more than in the runoff election in 2019. There was also an increase in the number of people voting in the 2023 election by 3.6%. She took the victory in North, East, Southeast, and Downtown precincts. She won the election with 55.4% of the votes and over 7,000 more votes.

== Tenure ==
On July 1, 2020, McLean presided over the swearing-in of Boise's new police chief, Ryan Lee, who had been confirmed to the position by the Boise City Council. The ceremony took place the day following a Boise Black Lives Matter rally. McLean does not support defunding the police to divert funds to social services. In response to a question about her position, she stated that "We have to have a safe city if we’re going to have a city where everyone can thrive. I’m in full support of our police department." McLean has stated that she supports increasing funding for social services while maintaining funding for the police department.

McLean announced in March 2020 that April rents in city-owned public housing would be forgiven, and that during the same period the city would place a moratorium on evictions from public rental housing.

In November 2020, in response to rising numbers of COVID-19 cases and occupied hospital beds, McLean issued a mask mandate and closed public facilities. In response to the mask mandate, there were protests outside McLean's residence, in addition to a mask-burning ceremony. The city of Boise announced in January 2021 that public facilities would expand services beginning on February 1, 2021. McLean noted that "We have seen a steady hold in cases the last couple weeks and our city is here to serve the public."

McLean announced Idaho's votes in the roll call at the 2020 Democratic National Convention where she also promoted the city's efforts to combat global warming. Due to Idaho's rising population, McLean has worked with city developers to build affordable housing.

In April 2025, following Idaho state legislation aimed at preventing the city of Boise from flying the Pride flag outside City Hall, McLean’s administration moved to preserve the tradition by supporting a City Council resolution that designated the Pride flag as an official city flag.

== Appointments ==
Lauren McLean appointed Christopher Dennison as the new Chief of Police, and he was officially sworn in on August 27, 2024. His appointment followed Mayor McLean asking the former chief, Ryan Lee, to step down in 2022 following numerous complaints made against him. Additionally, Mayor McLean appointed two new city council members, Colin Nash and Meredith Stead. Both were initially appointed to fill vacancies, and were later elected to their positions. McLean also appointed Nicki Hellenkamp as director of homelessness and housing policy.

== Electoral history ==
2019 Boise mayoral election results
Party	Candidate	Votes	%
Nonpartisan	Lauren McLean	23,669	45.7%
Nonpartisan	Dave Bieter	15,711	30.3%
Nonpartisan	Rebecca Arnold	6,863	13.2%
Nonpartisan	H. Brent Coles	3,804	7.3%
Nonpartisan	Wayne Richey	847	1.6%
Nonpartisan	Adriel Martinez	588	1.1%
Nonpartisan	Cortney Nielsen	360	0.7%
Total votes		53,303	100%

2019 Boise mayoral runoff election
Party	Candidate	Votes	%
Nonpartisan	Lauren McLean	30,306	65.5
Nonpartisan	Dave Bieter	15,998	34.5
Total votes		46,304	100%

2023 Boise mayoral election
Candidate	Votes	%
Lauren McLean (incumbent)	33,926	55.45%
Mike Masterson	26,542	43.38%
Joe Evans	563	0.92%
Aaron Reis	153	0.25%
Total votes	61,184	100.00%

== See also ==
- List of mayors of Boise, Idaho

Political offices
Preceded by Dave Bieter	Mayor of Boise; 2020–present	Incumbent
