= Plug-in electric vehicles in Idaho =

As of July 2022, there were about 4,500 electric vehicles registered in the U.S. state of Idaho.

In 2022, Idaho was ranked by Zutobi as the best state for electric vehicle ownership (tied with Washington).

== Government policy ==
As of 2022, Idaho does not offer any tax incentives for electric vehicle purchases.

As of 2022, the state government charges a $75 registration fee for electric vehicles.

== Charging stations ==
As of July 2022, there were 112 public charging stations in Idaho.

The Infrastructure Investment and Jobs Act, signed into law in November 2021, allocates US$28 million to charging stations in Idaho.

== Manufacturing ==
Idaho has been proposed as a hub for the mining of cobalt to be used in electric vehicles.

== By region ==
=== Boise ===
In 2020, the Boise City Council passed a resolution requiring that new homes be constructed with electric vehicle charging infrastructure.
