= Holli Woodings =

American politician

Member of the Boise City Council
- In office January 2018 – July 2023
- Preceded by: Maryanne Jordan
- Succeeded by: Meredith Stead

Member of the Idaho House of Representatives from the 19th district
- In office December 1, 2012 – November 30, 2014
- Preceded by: Brian Cronin
- Succeeded by: Melissa Wintrow

Personal details
- Born: Medford, Oregon, U.S.
- Party: Democratic
- Education: Boise State University (BA)
- Website: woodingsforidaho.com

Holli Woodings is an American politician who served in Idaho House of Representatives, representing District 19B, which covers the northern section of Boise, Idaho. She was the 2014 Democratic nominee for Idaho secretary of state. Woodings served on the Boise City Council until July 2023.

== Education ==
Woodings was born in Medford, Oregon. She earned a Bachelor of Arts degree in English from Boise State University.

== Elections ==
When Representative Brian Cronin retired and left the 19B seat open, Woodings won the three-way May 15, 2012 Democratic Primary with 1,636 votes (56.4%), and won the November 6, 2012 General election with 14,378 votes (65.7%) against Republican nominee Don Howard.

Woodings ran unsuccessfully to succeed Republican Ben Ysursa for Secretary of State of Idaho.

At the Idaho State Democratic Convention Woodings was chosen to be a delegate for Hillary Clinton at the 2016 Democratic National Convention.

Woodings served on the Boise City Council January 2018 to July 2023. She also served as city council president pro tem.
