= Melissa Wintrow =

American politician from Idaho

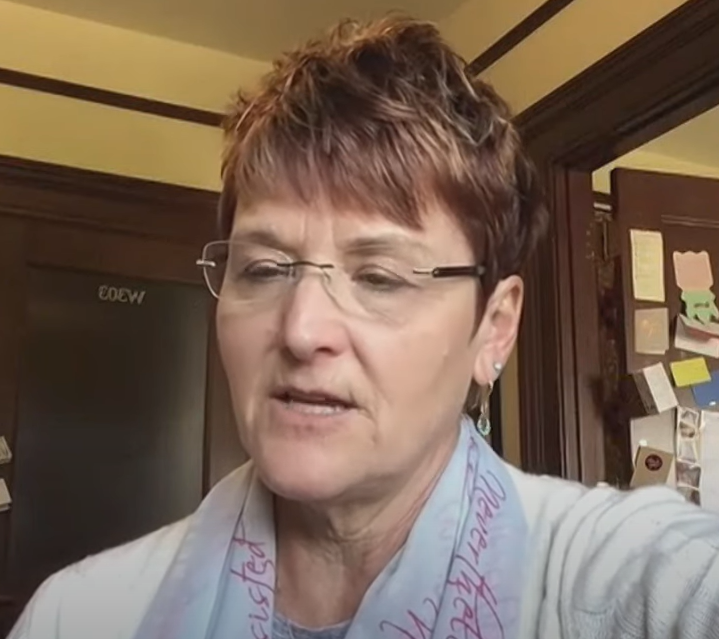
- Wintrow in 2024

Minority Leader of the Idaho Senate
- Incumbent
- Assumed office December 1, 2022
- Preceded by: Michelle Stennett

Member of the Idaho Senate from the 19th district
- Incumbent
- Assumed office December 1, 2020
- Preceded by: Cherie Buckner-Webb

Member of the Idaho House of Representatives from the 19th district
- In office December 1, 2014 – December 1, 2020
- Preceded by: Holli Woodings
- Succeeded by: Chris Mathias

Personal details
- Born: Troy, Ohio, U.S.
- Party: Democratic
- Education: Miami University (BA); University of Georgia (MEd)
- Website: Campaign website

Melissa Wintrow is an American politician serving as a member of the Idaho Senate from the 19th district. Elected in November 2020, she assumed office on December 1, 2020. Wintrow was previously a member of the Idaho House of Representatives from 2014 to 2020. She is a Democrat.

== Early life and education ==
Born Troy, Ohio, Wintrow earned a Bachelor of Arts in English literature from Miami University in 1988. She then earned a Master of Education in higher education from the University of Georgia in 1990.

== Career ==
Wintrow was the first director of the Boise State Women's Center, where she produced The Vagina Monologues. She was the assistant director for residence education at Boise State University when she resigned to assume her position in the Idaho House of Representatives.

Idaho Senate
| Preceded by Michelle Stennett | Minority Leader of the Idaho Senate; 2022–present | Incumbent |
