= H. Brent Coles =

American politician (born c. 1951)

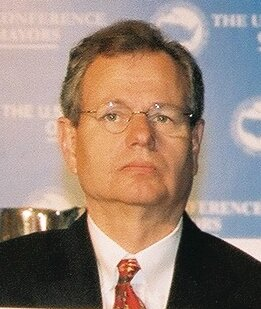
- Coles in 2001

52nd Mayor of Boise
- In office January 5, 1993 – February 15, 2003
- Preceded by: Dirk Kempthorne
- Succeeded by: Carolyn Terteling-Payne

58th President of the United States Conference of Mayors
- In office 2000–2001
- Preceded by: Wellington Webb
- Succeeded by: Marc Morial

Personal details
- Born: c. 1951 (age 74–75) Idaho Falls, Idaho, U.S.
- Party: Republican
- Education: Brigham Young University (BA); California State University, Long Beach (MPA)

H. Brent Coles (born c. 1951) is an American politician who served as mayor of Boise, Idaho from 1993 to 2003. Coles resigned from office after accepting an illegal trip to the 2002 Winter Olympics from an insurance company. Coles was a candidate in the 2019 Boise mayoral election, placing fourth out of seven candidates in first round of voting.

== Early life and education ==
Born in Idaho Falls, Coles moved to Boise with his family in 1968 and graduated from Borah High School in 1970. He earned a Bachelor of Arts degree in political science from Brigham Young University and a Master of Public Administration from California State University, Long Beach.

== Career ==
Coles was appointed mayor in January 1993 by the Boise City Council, upon the resignation of Dirk Kempthorne, who was elected to the United States Senate in 1992. Coles was elected to a full term as mayor in November 1993, defeating Tracy Andrus, and was re-elected in 1997 and 2001.

In 2000 and 2001, Coles served as president of the United States Conference of Mayors.

In February 2003, Coles resigned after being charged with accepting an illegal trip from Blue Cross of Idaho to the 2002 Winter Olympics in Salt Lake City, Utah. Prior to his resignation Coles had been the target of a recall election drive. City council member Carolyn Terteling-Payne was appointed to serve until the end of 2003.

Coles was indicted in May 2003 by an Ada County grand jury for five felonies stemming from the incident and related activities. In November 2003, Coles pleaded an Alford plea to a count of presenting a fraudulent account or voucher and a count of misuse of public money by officers. The remaining charges were dropped as part of a plea bargain. In January 2004 he was sentenced to 180 days in jail and three years' probation. In August 2011, The state of Idaho levied a tax lien in the amount of $44,691.31 against Coles and his wife for unpaid individual income taxes.

On September 6, 2019, Coles announced that he would again run for the Boise mayoral seat in the 2019 Boise mayoral election. Coles faced long-time Boise Mayor Dave Bieter, president of the Boise City Council President Lauren McLean, and several other candidates. Coles came in fourth place out of seven candidates, garnering 7.3% of votes cast. McLean and Bieter advanced to a December 3, 2019 runoff election, with McLean declared the eventual winner.

== See also ==
- List of mayors of Boise

Political offices
Preceded by Dirk Kempthorne	Mayor of Boise, Idaho; 1993–2003	Succeeded by Carolyn Terteling-Payne
Preceded by Wellington Webb	President of the United States Conference of Mayors; 2000–2001	Succeeded by Marc Morial
