= Mike Burkett (politician) =

American politician from Idaho

Member of the Idaho Senate from District 19
- In office December 1, 2002 – December 1, 2008
- Preceded by: Betsy Dunklin
- Succeeded by: Nicole LeFavour

Member of the Idaho Senate from District 21
- In office December 1, 1988 – December 1, 1992
- Preceded by: Jim Risch
- Succeeded by: John Peavey

Personal details
- Born: June 7, 1948 (age 78) Keosauqua, Iowa
- Party: Democratic
- Spouse: Sharon
- Education: United States Air Force Academy (B.S. 1970), University of Idaho (J.D. 1979)
- Profession: Attorney

F. Michael Burkett Jr. (born June 7, 1948) is an American attorney and Democratic politician from Idaho.

A 1970 graduate of the United States Air Force Academy, Burkett served in the U.S. Air Force and then earned his Juris Doctor degree from the University of Idaho College of Law in 1979. He is currently a partner with Huntley Park, LLP in Boise.

Burkett first won election to the Idaho Legislature in 1988 by defeating Republican Senate President Pro Tempore Jim Risch in one of the state's most significant political upsets that year. He served in the state senate from 1989 to 1992.

In 1994, Burkett was an unsuccessful candidate for attorney general, losing to Republican nominee Alan G. Lance in the general election in November.

In 2002, Burkett was reelected to the state senate from District 19, which includes the North End neighborhood of Boise. The district is one of only a few in the state which routinely votes for Democrats over Republicans.

Burkett was not a candidate for reelection in 2008, and was succeeded by Democratic legislator Nicole LeFavour.
