= Idaho's 19th legislative district =

American legislative district

Idaho's 19th legislative district is one of 35 districts of the Idaho Legislature. It is currently represented by Cherie Buckner-Webb, Democrat of Boise, Lauren Necochea, Democrat of Boise, and Melissa Wintrow, Democrat of Boise.

== District profile ==
=== 2012–present ===
District 19 currently consists of a portion of Ada County.

Legislature	Session	Senate	House Seat A	House Seat B
62nd (2012 - 2014)	1st	Cherie Buckner-Webb (D)	Mat Erpelding (D)	Holli Woodings (D)
62nd (2012 - 2014)	2nd	Cherie Buckner-Webb (D)	Mat Erpelding (D)	Holli Woodings (D)
63rd (2014 - 2016)	1st	Cherie Buckner-Webb (D)	Mat Erpelding (D)	Melissa Wintrow (D)
63rd (2014 - 2016)	2nd	Cherie Buckner-Webb (D)	Mat Erpelding (D)	Melissa Wintrow (D)
64th (2016 - 2018)	1st	Cherie Buckner-Webb (D)	Mat Erpelding (D)	Melissa Wintrow (D)
64th (2016 - 2018)	2nd	Cherie Buckner-Webb (D)	Mat Erpelding (D)	Melissa Wintrow (D)
65th (2018 - 2020)	1st	Cherie Buckner-Webb (D)	Mat Erpelding (D)	Melissa Wintrow (D)
65th (2018 - 2020)	2nd	Cherie Buckner-Webb (D)	Lauren Necochea (D)	Melissa Wintrow (D)
66th (2020 - 2022)	1st	Melissa Wintrow (D)	Lauren Necochea (D)	Chris Mathias (D)
66th (2020 - 2022)	2nd	Melissa Wintrow (D)	Lauren Necochea (D)	Chris Mathias (D)

=== 2002–2012 ===
From 2002 to 2012, District 19 consisted of a portion of Ada County.

Legislature	Session	Senate	House Seat A	House Seat B
57th (2002 - 2004)	1st	Mike Burkett (D)	Dave Bieter (D)	Ken Robison (D)
57th (2002 - 2004)	2nd	Mike Burkett (D)	Ann Pasley-Stuart (D)	Ken Robison (D)
58th (2004 - 2006)	1st	Mike Burkett (D)	Ann Pasley-Stuart (D)	Nicole LeFavour (D)
58th (2004 - 2006)	2nd	Mike Burkett (D)	Ann Pasley-Stuart (D)	Nicole LeFavour (D)
59th (2006 - 2008)	1st	Mike Burkett (D)	Ann Pasley-Stuart (D)	Nicole LeFavour (D)
59th (2006 - 2008)	2nd	Mike Burkett (D)	Ann Pasley-Stuart (D)	Nicole LeFavour (D)
60th (2008 - 2010)	1st	Nicole LeFavour (D)	Ann Pasley-Stuart (D)	Brian Cronin (D)
60th (2008 - 2010)	2nd	Nicole LeFavour (D)	Ann Pasley-Stuart (D)	Brian Cronin (D)
61st (2010 - 2012)	1st	Nicole LeFavour (D)	Cherie Buckner-Webb (D)	Brian Cronin (D)
61st (2010 - 2012)	2nd	Nicole LeFavour (D)	Cherie Buckner-Webb (D)	Brian Cronin (D)

=== 1992–2002 ===
From 1992 to 2002, District 17 consisted of a portion of Ada County.

Legislature	Session	Senate	House Seat A	House Seat B
51st (1992 - 1994)	1st	Sue Reents (D)	Kitty Gurnsey (R)	Ken Robison (D)
51st (1992 - 1994)	2nd	Sue Reents (D)	Kitty Gurnsey (R)	Ken Robison (D)
52nd (1994 - 1996)	1st	Sue Reents (D)	Kitty Gurnsey (R)	Ken Robison (D)
52nd (1994 - 1996)	2nd	Sue Reents (D)	Kitty Gurnsey (R)	Ken Robison (D)
53rd (1996 - 1998)	1st	Betsy Dunklin (D)	Pat Bieter (D)	Ken Robison (D)
53rd (1996 - 1998)	2nd	Betsy Dunklin (D)	Pat Bieter (D)	Ken Robison (D)
54th (1998 - 2000)	1st	Betsy Dunklin (D)	Dave Bieter (D)	Ken Robison (D)
54th (1998 - 2000)	2nd	Betsy Dunklin (D)	Dave Bieter (D)	Ken Robison (D)
55th (2000 - 2002)	1st	Betsy Dunklin (D)	Dave Bieter (D)	Ken Robison (D)
55th (2000 - 2002)	2nd	Betsy Dunklin (D)	Dave Bieter (D)	Ken Robison (D)

== See also ==
- List of Idaho senators
- List of Idaho representatives
