= Carolyn Terteling-Payne =

American politician (born 1937)

Mayor of Boise
- Interim
- In office February 18, 2003 – January 6, 2004
- Preceded by: H. Brent Coles
- Succeeded by: Dave Bieter

Personal details
- Born: December 20, 1937 (age 87)
- Education: University of Idaho (BA)

Carolyn Terteling-Payne (born December 20, 1937) is an American politician who was the interim mayor of Boise, Idaho, from 2003 to 2004.

== Early life and education ==
Terteling-Payne graduated from Boise High School. In 1959, she earned a Bachelor of Arts degree in English with minors in psychology and French from the University of Idaho. Terteling-Payne became the Freshman Class Officer at University of Idaho. She was in student government and a member of the university's executive board. Terteling-Payne was a member of Phi Beta Kappa, an honor society, and a member and president of Gamma Phi Beta sorority.

=== Mayor of Boise ===
In 2003, incumbent Boise mayor H. Brent Coles resigned after being charged with the misuse of public funds. In February 2003, Terteling-Payne was appointed as interim mayor of Boise to serve the remaining term. She was the first woman mayor of Boise. While Mayor, she fired the city attorney and the city spokeswoman. In August 2003, the Office of Internal Audit was created. She was not a candidate for election to a full term in 2003.

=== Later career ===
From 2004 to December 2006, Terteling-Payne was Idaho director of human resources under then-Governor Jim Risch. Terteling-Payne also served on the board of directors of the St. Luke's Boise Medical Center from 1976 to 2014.

== Personal life ==
Terteling-Payne's husband was Joseph L. Terteling. In August 1991, after 32 years of marriage, she divorced him. In May 1995, she married Frank A. Payne.

Political offices
Preceded by H. Brent Coles	Mayor of Boise, Idaho; 2003 – 2004	Succeeded by Dave Bieter
