= Boise City Council =

Governing body of Boise, Idaho, U.S.

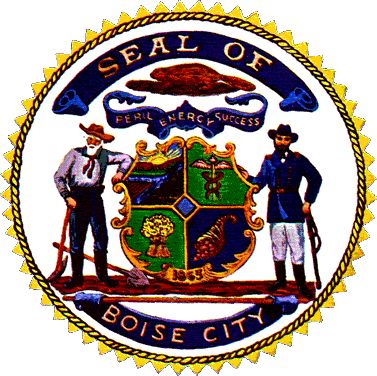

Type
- Type: Unicameral

Leadership
- Council President: Meredith Stead
- Seats: 6

Elections
- Voting system: First-past-the-post
- Last election: November 4, 2025
- Next election: November 2, 2027

Meeting place
- Boise City Hall, 150 North Capitol Blvd., Boise, ID 83702

Website
- Boise City Council Website

The Boise City Council is the governing body of the City of Boise, Idaho. The council is composed of six members elected in staggered four-year terms. Three of the six seats are elected in November every odd-numbered year.

Before 2020, when the Idaho state legislature passed a law requiring councils of large cities to draw electoral districts, elections were at-large for four-year terms. As a result of that law, the Boise council drew six districts to be used in the 2023 election, with odd-numbered districts electing a member for four years and even-numbered districts electing members for a single two year term.

Regular council meetings are held at Boise City Hall on Tuesdays at 6:00 PM, except on the fourth Tuesday of the month when they are held at 12:00 PM. Special meetings may be called by the Mayor of Boise or by a majority of the Boise City Council. Work sessions are usually held the afternoon before regular meetings.

== Members ==
Members of the Boise City Council as of May 14, 2024:

Presiding Officer

- Mayor Lauren McLean (ex officio)

Officers:

- Council President: Colin Nash, Council District 2
- President Pro Tempore: Meredith Stead, Council District 5

Members:

- Jordan Morales, Council District 4
- Jimmy Hallyburton, Council District 6
- Kathy Corless, Council District 3
- Luci Willits, Council District 1

== See also ==
- Ada County Board of Commissioners
