= Dave Bieter =

American politician (born 1959)

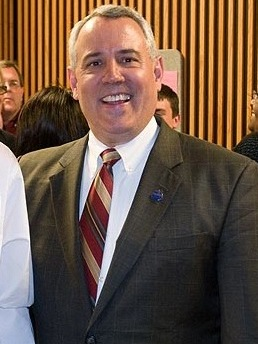
- Bieter in 2009

55th Mayor of Boise
- In office January 6, 2004 – January 7, 2020
- Preceded by: Carolyn Terteling-Payne
- Succeeded by: Lauren McLean

Member of the Idaho House of Representatives from the 19th district
- In office January 1999 – January 2003
- Preceded by: Pat Bieter
- Succeeded by: Anne Pasley-Stuart

Personal details
- Born: David Harold Bieter; November 1, 1959 (age 66) Boise, Idaho, U.S.
- Party: Democratic
- Spouse: Julia Nemeth
- Relations: Pat Bieter (father)
- Children: 1
- Education: University of St. Thomas (BA); University of Idaho (JD)

David Harold Bieter (born November 1, 1959) is an American politician and attorney who served as mayor of Boise from 2004 to 2020. A Democrat, Bieter was the longest-serving mayor in the city's history. According to The New York Times, he was the only Basque-speaking mayor in the United States as of 2012. His father, Pat Bieter, was also a local politician who served in the Idaho House of Representatives.

== Early life and education ==
Born in Boise, Bieter graduated from Bishop Kelly High School in 1978. He was third of five children born to Pat Bieter (born 1930) and Eloise Garmendia Bieter (born 1925).

Pat was a Midwesterner of German descent; Eloise was the daughter of immigrants from the Basque region of Spain. A teacher and college professor, Pat became active in Boise's Basque community and started the Basque studies program at Boise State University, taking 75 students, seven faculty, and his wife and five children to live in the Franco-era Basque Country for the 1974–75 academic year, when David was a freshman in high school. Pat and Eloise Bieter died in an automobile accident in 1999.

Bieter earned a bachelor's degree in international studies from University of St. Thomas in Minnesota and a Juris Doctor from the University of Idaho College of Law in Moscow.

== Career ==
Bieter was admitted to the Idaho State Bar in 1986. Prior to entering politics, Bieter worked as a civil attorney for Bonner County in North Idaho. He later served as a land-use specialist in the Ada County Prosecutor's Office in Boise before establishing a private practice, specializing in municipal law.

In 1999, Bieter was appointed to the Idaho House of Representatives to succeed his late father, Pat Bieter. Bieter was elected to a full term in 2000 and re-elected in 2002.

=== Mayor of Boise ===
In 2004, Bieter was elected Boise mayor in an open-seat, nonpartisan contest, defeating Republican Party activist Chuck Winder and Ada County Sheriff Vaughn Killeen. He was reelected in 2007 with 64 percent of the vote, defeating city councilman Jim Tibbs.

Bieter easily won a third four-year term as mayor in November 2011, defeating David B. Hall with 74 percent of the vote. He was the first Boise mayor to win a third four-year term since Richard Eardley in 1981.

Bieter won a fourth term in 2015, defeating Judy Peavey-Derr and Seth Holden with 69 percent of the vote. Bieter is the first Boise mayor to win four four-year terms and the first Boise mayor to win a fourth term since R. E. Edlefsen in 1957. With the win Bieter became the longest-serving mayor in the city's history.

As mayor, Bieter has emphasized the need to protect and enhance Boise's livability to create "a welcoming city and a center for business, culture, education and outdoor recreation." He is credited with helping to expand Boise's parks system, championing the opening of four new neighborhood libraries, and promoting a "housing first" approach to combating homelessness.

Under Bieter, Boise has expanded the purchase of open space and easements in the foothills areas north of the city to protect wildlife habitat, water quality, and recreation opportunities. In 2015, a ballot measure authorizing additional property taxes to support foothills preservation passed with 74 percent approval; two years later the same measure, resubmitted to voters to correct a clerical error, passed with 83 percent approval.

In 2015, Bieter was instrumental in creation of Trailhead, a non-profit business incubator supported by the City of Boise, its redevelopment agency, and local entrepreneurs. He also worked with the Boise School District to launch Idaho's first public preschool program; after just two years, a study showed a sizable increase in reading scores.

Boise's generally progressive city government has found itself at odds with the much more conservative Idaho Legislature, which has moved to prohibit cities from raising the minimum wage or regulating ridesharing companies.

Bieter was an early supporter of Barack Obama in the 2008 U.S. presidential election. He was a Hillary Clinton delegate for Idaho at the 2016 Democratic National Convention.

Bieter ran for a fifth term as mayor in the 2019 Boise mayoral election, finishing second place behind City Council President Lauren McLean in a field of seven candidates. As no candidate won 50 percent of votes cast, McLean and Bieter competed again in a runoff scheduled December 3, 2019. McLean defeated Bieter, earning 65 percent of votes cast to his 35.

=== Later career ===
Dave currently serves on the Capital City Development Corporation board.

== Personal life ==
Bieter married his wife Julia in 1998. They have one daughter.

In addition to his native English, Bieter is fluent in Spanish and in the Basque language, Euskera, and identifies himself as ethnically Basque. He performed for many years with the Oinkari Basque dance troupe and has served as a board member of Boise's Basque Center and Basque Charities. His brothers John and Mark co-authored "An Enduring Legacy," a history of the Basque people in Idaho.

In 2005, Basque President Juan José Ibarretxe presented Bieter with an award for his work to promote Basque culture around the world.

Political offices
Preceded by Carolyn Terteling-Payne	Mayor of Boise; 2004–2020	Succeeded by Lauren McLean
