= 2018 Idaho lieutenant gubernatorial election =

- November 6, 2018
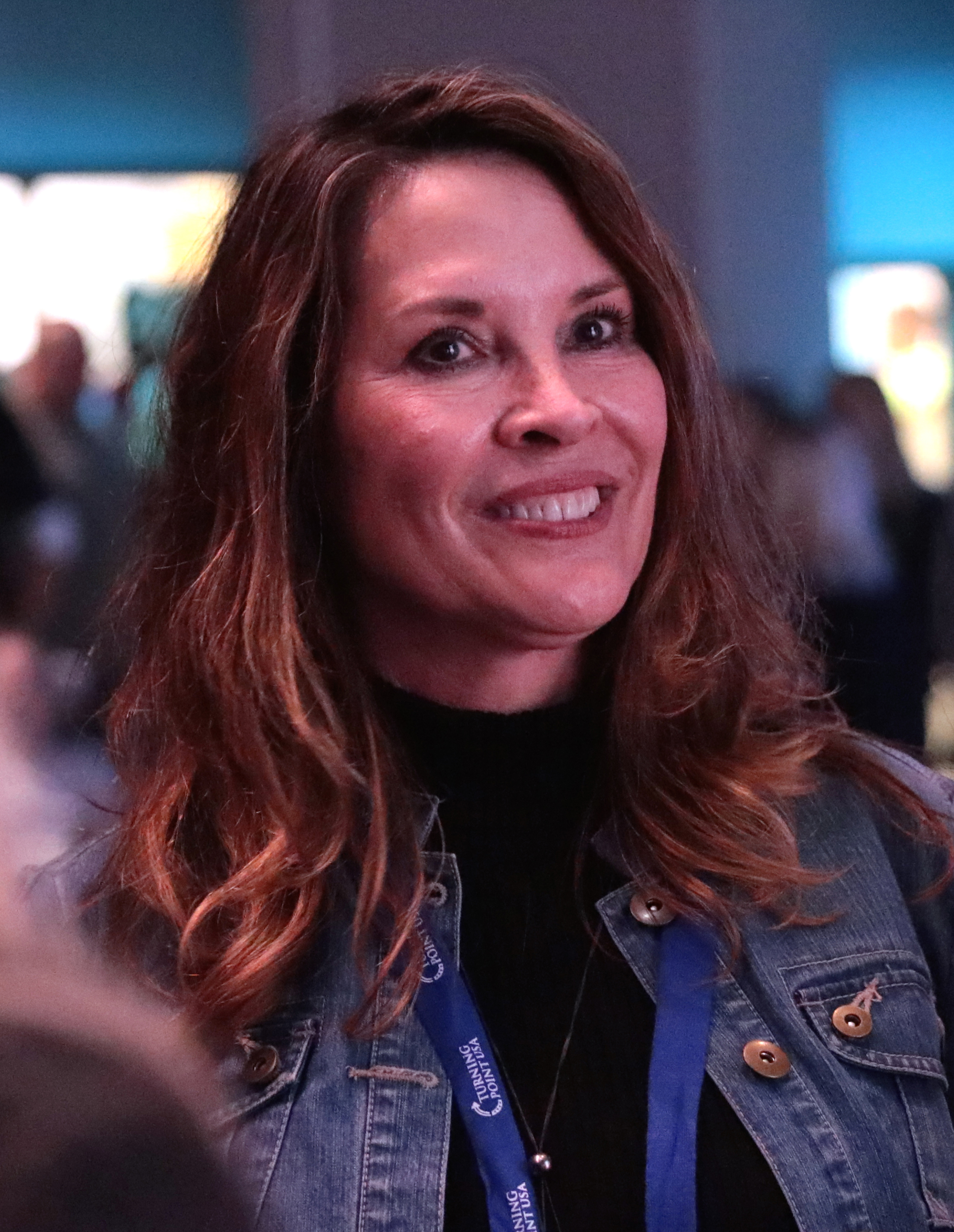

Nominee	Janice McGeachin	Kristin Collum
Party	Republican	Democratic
Popular vote	356,512	240,355
Percentage	59.7%	40.3%
- McGeachin: 50–60% 60–70% 70–80% 80–90% Collum: 50–60% 60–70%
Governor before election
Brad Little
Republican
Elected Governor
Janice McGeachin
Republican

The 2018 election for lieutenant governor of Idaho took place on November 6, 2018. The primary election to select the candidates from each party to run in the general election took place on May 15, 2018. Lieutenant governors serve a four-year term or terms. In 2018, the incumbent lieutenant governor, Brad Little, won the Republican nomination for governor and declined to run for re-election in order to run for governor.

Far-right former state representative Janice McGeachin won the election in a landslide, defeating Democrat Kristin Collum. After one term, she retired in 2022 to run unsuccessfully for Governor.

== Democratic primary ==
=== Candidates ===
- Kristin Collum of Boise, Idaho
- Jim Fabe of Ketchum, Idaho

=== Results ===
Kristin Collum received 52,417 votes and 88.2% of the votes, and Jim Fabe received 6,987 votes and 11.8% of the votes.

Democratic primary results
Party	Candidate	Votes	%
Democratic	Kristin Collum	52,417	88.2
Democratic	Jim Fabe	6,987	11.8
Total votes		59,404	100.0

== Republican primary ==
=== Declared candidates ===
- Marv Hagedorn of Meridian, Idaho
- Janice McGeachin of Idaho Falls, Idaho
- Bob Nonini of Coeur d'Alene, Idaho
- Kelley Packer of McCammon, Idaho
- Stephen J. Yates of Boise, Idaho

=== Withdrawn candidates ===
- Rebecca W. Arnold of Boise, Idaho

=== Campaign ===
On March 3, 2018, Bob Nonini reportedly nodded when asked at a candidates' forum if the punishment for getting an abortion should include the death penalty. However, he denied ever having nodded in agreement. "Prosecutions have always been focused on the abortionist," he said later, but such a law and "...the threat of prosecution, would dramatically reduce abortion. That is my goal."

=== Debate ===
2018 Idaho lieutenant gubernatorial election Republican primary debate
No.	Date	Host	Moderator	Link	Republican	Republican	Republican	Republican	Republican
Key: P Participant A Absent N Not invited I Invited W Withdrawn									
Key: P Participant A Absent N Not invited I Invited W Withdrawn					Kelley Packer	Bob Nonini	Marv Hagedorn	Janice McGeachin	Steve Yates
1	April 18, 2018	IdahoPTV	Melissa Davlin	PBS	P	P	P	P	P

=== Results ===
Results by county: McGeachin: 40–50%; 30–40%; 20–30%; Yates: 50–60%; 40–50%; 30–40%; 20–30%; Nonini: 30–40%; Packer: 50–60%; 40–50%

Idaho lieutenant governor Republican primary, 2018
Party	Candidate	Votes	%
Republican	Janice McGeachin	51,098	28.9
Republican	Steve Yates	48,269	27.3
Republican	Marv Hagedorn	26,653	15.1
Republican	Bob Nonini	26,556	15.0
Republican	Kelley Packer	24,513	13.7
Total votes		177,089	100.0

== Voter eligibility ==
Idaho's closed primary election allows only registered Republicans and unaffiliated voters the option of voting to select the next Republican candidate for lieutenant governor. Any registered or unregistered voter may vote in the Democratic primary to select the next lieutenant governor candidate from the two candidates running. Idaho has a same-day voter registration system which allows any voter to register to vote at a polling place on election day.

== General election ==
=== Debate ===
2018 Idaho lieutenant gubernatorial election debate
No.	Date	Host	Moderator	Link	Republican	Democratic
Key: P Participant A Absent N Not invited I Invited W Withdrawn						
Key: P Participant A Absent N Not invited I Invited W Withdrawn					Janice McGeachin	Kristin Collum
1	October 17, 2018	IdahoPTV	Melissa Davlin	Idaho PBS	P	P

=== Endorsements ===
Janice McGeachin (R)

State executive officials

- Lawrence Wasden, Idaho Attorney General.
- Sherri Ybarra, Idaho Superintendent of Public Instruction.
- Dave Leroy, former Attorney General and Lieutenant Governor of Idaho.

State legislative officials

- Sheryl Nuxoll, former Idaho state senator.

Organizations

- NRA Political Victory Fund
- Idaho Republican Liberty Caucus
Kristin Collum (D)

State executive officials

- Christine Gregoire, former Governor of Washington.
- Jim Jones, former Idaho Attorney General and Idaho Supreme Court Chief Justice. (Republican)

State executive candidates

- Paulette Jordan, Democratic candidate for Governor of Idaho.

Local officials

- Dave Bieter, Mayor of Boise.

Individuals

- Jessica Ripple, co-founder of Idaho Moms for a Brighter Future.

Organizations

- Idaho AFL-CIO
- Conservation Voters for Idaho
- National Organization for Women, Southwest Idaho chapter.
- United Action for Idaho

Newspapers

- Idaho Statesman

=== Results ===
Janice McGeachin was elected Idaho's 43rd lieutenant governor with 356,512 votes and 59.7% of the votes. Kristin Collum received 240,355 votes.

Idaho lieutenant gubernatorial election, 2018
Party	Candidate	Votes	%
Republican	Janice McGeachin	356,512	59.73%
Democratic	Kristin Collum	240,355	40.27%
Total votes		596,867	100%

==== By congressional district ====
McGeachin won both congressional districts.

District	McGeachin	Collum	Representative
1st	64%	36%	Raúl Labrador (115th Congress)
1st	64%	36%	Russ Fulcher (116th Congress)
2nd	55%	45%	Mike Simpson

== See also ==
- 2018 Idaho gubernatorial election
