= Gayann DeMordaunt =

American politician from Idaho

Member of the Idaho House of Representatives from the 14B district
- In office December 1, 2016 – November 30, 2022
- Preceded by: Reed DeMordaunt
- Succeeded by: Josh Tanner

Personal details
- Party: Republican
- Spouse: Reed DeMordaunt
- Children: 6
- Education: Brigham Young University

Gayann DeMordaunt is an American politician who served as a member of the Idaho House of Representatives for the 14B district from 2016 to 2022.

== Education ==
DeMordaunt earned her bachelor's degree from Brigham Young University.

== Career ==
DeMordaunt is a board member of the American Red Cross of Greater Idaho and a founder of North Star Charter School. She is also on the board of CICFO-USA, a non-profit dedicated to supporting a children's home in Phnom Penh, Cambodia.

=== Committee assignments ===
- Vice Chair of Business Committee
- Education Committee
- Transportation & Defense Committee

=== Political positions ===
In 2018, DeMordaunt was awarded the American Conservative Union Foundation's Award for Conservative Excellence.

==== Taxes ====
In 2018, DeMordaunt was one of 38 House cosponsors of H0463, which lowered income tax rates. In March 2020, DeMordaunt supported SB 1277 A, a bill that would have lowered property taxes by increasing the maximum homeowner's exemption from $100,000 to $112,000.

DeMordaunt also supported a bill to freeze Idaho property taxes for a year, claiming that “[p]roperty taxes happen to be the most un-American thing we do in this country,” and that the legislature "ought to be addressing property taxes in a comprehensive way.”

==== Regulation ====
DeMordaunt was co-chair of the first Idaho Legislative Regulatory Reform Joint Subcommittee 2018. DeMordaunt served as co-chair of the 2018–2019 Occupational Licensing and Certification Laws Interim Committee. This joint subcommittee was focused on examining the rules and regulations of state occupational licensing boards. In 2019, DeMordaunt sponsored HB248, legislation to make it easier for active military families and veterans to obtain occupational licenses.

==== Education ====
DeMordaunt played a key role in a 2020 initiative called Idaho Codes, an online computer science course to teach middle school and high school students computer programming skills, including building websites and developing computer and phone apps.

DeMordaunt was the House sponsor of SB 1280, a bill that moved Idaho school board elections from May to November.

DeMordaunt was the House sponsor of SB 1180 which would help charter schools obtain lower interest rate on facilities bonds. The bill was signed by the Governor on April 3 and went into effect on July 1, 2019.

DeMordaunt voted in favor of HB 523, which would increase state funding for teacher salaries incrementally over five years.

==== Government transparency ====
DeMordaunt drafted and sponsored HB 606 and 611, both of which increase government transparency. Both bills were signed into law by the Governor. HB 606 amends the Open Meetings Law to include public agencies, including those established through executive order of the governor. HB 611 requires the agenda for open meetings of government entities to be posted online and that "action items" on the agenda be clearly labeled.

==== Abortion ====
During the 2018 session of the Idaho House, DeMordaunt was the lead sponsor of SB 1243, a bill that was also sponsored by Right to Life of Idaho. SB 1243 requires that a woman be informed that she may be able to reverse the chemical abortion procedure in the event that she changes her mind. In addition, the Idaho Department of Health and Welfare is required to include this information in the informed consent materials that are provided to every woman who is considering an abortion. This bill passed both the House and the Senate and was signed into law on March 20, 2018.

During the 2019 session of the Idaho House, DeMordaunt was a sponsor of SB 1049, a bill that updated the Idaho "partial birth abortion" ban to be consistent with federal law. Specifically, the legislation bans partial-birth abortions except when necessary to save a pregnant mother's life. Governor Little signed this bill into law on March 7, 2019.

==== Guns ====
The NRA Political Victory Fund endorsed DeMordaunt for the 2020 primary elections in Idaho and gave her an "A" rating on gun rights issues.

In 2018, DeMordaunt voted in favor of SB 1313, a "stand your ground" bill that was designed to consolidate and codify existing law to clearly protect the rights of individuals to defend themselves. This legislation clarifies that a person may exercise the right of self-defense in their home, in their vehicle, and at their place of business or employment.

== Electoral history ==
=== 2022 ===
DeMordaunt was defeated by Josh Tanner in the Republican primary, only receiving 44.6% of the vote.

=== 2020 ===
DeMordaunt defeated Josh Tanner in the Republican primary with 57.7% of the vote.

DeMordaunt defeated Shelly Brock in the general election with 70.4% of the vote.

=== 2018 ===
DeMordaunt was unopposed in the Republican primary.

DeMordaunt was unopposed in the general election.

=== 2016 ===
With her husband Reed DeMordaunt choosing not to run for re election, DeMordaunt decided to run.

DeMordaunt defeated Douglas R. Jones in the Republican primary with 69.98% of the vote.

DeMordaunt defeated Glida Bothwell in the general election with 72.17% of the vote.

=== 2014 ===
DeMordaunt was unopposed running for Republican Precinct Committeeman 1416.

=== 2012 ===
DeMordaunt lost to Barry Peterson to replace Norm Semanko as chair of the Idaho Republican Party in 2012.
