= Jonathan Parker (politician) =

Chair of the Idaho Republican Party
- In office July 2017 – February 2019
- Preceded by: Stephen J. Yates
- Succeeded by: Raúl Labrador

Personal details
- Party: Republican
- Education: University of Idaho, Moscow (BA); Rhema Bible Training College (MA)

Jonathan Parker is an American politician. He is a former Idaho Republican Party Chairman and executive director.

== Early life and education ==
Parker grew up in Spokane, Washington. He attended Joel E Ferris High School. Parker graduated from the University of Idaho with a degree in political science. He then pursued a master's degree in Pastoral Ministries at Rhema Bible College in Tulsa, Oklahoma.

== Career and personal life ==
Parker was with the Idaho Water Users Association in the early 2000s. He served as Congressman Bill Sali District Director in 2007.

Parker was with the Boise office of the Holland and Hart law firm from July 2012 to 2018, Parker served as the Idaho director of government affairs for firm.

On December 19, 2019, an Ada County judge sentenced former Idaho Republican Party Chairman Jonathan Parker to 14 days in jail, 5 years of probation and 100 hours of community service after he pleaded guilty to stalking his estranged wife and unlawfully entering the home of a female colleague. He was arrested again in 2021 for using methamphetamine, a violation of his probation.

== Political career ==
Parker served as campaign manager for Joe Stegner's successful reelection campaign for the Idaho State Senate and in Norm Semanko's campaign for Idaho's 1st congressional district election, 2006.

Parker served as campaign strategist to Bill Sali re election campaign.

Parker served as senior advisor to Donna Jones election to Idaho state controller in 2006.

Parker served as the chairman, National Committeeman, and Secretary of the Idaho Young Republican Federation.

== Idaho Republican Party ==
In 2009, Parker was selected by Chairman Norm Semanko to serve as executive director. During his tenure, the Idaho Republican Party had its most successful election year (2010) up until that time. All Republicans were reelected to Statewide office, Walt Minnick, Democratic Congressman in the Idaho's 1st congressional district, was defeated, and Republicans won an additional five seats in the Idaho Legislature. For his work Parker was elected to the Idaho GOP Hall of Fame.

Parker was elected Idaho Republican Party chairman on July 22, 2017. Parker was elected to fill the position when Steve Yates, the former chairman, stepped down in April, 2017. Parker was re elected with unanimous consent on June 29, 2018. Parker resigned February 20, 2019, citing a need to spend more time as a father.

He had Frank Terraferma as executive director.

Party political offices
Preceded by Stephen J. Yates	Chair of the Idaho Republican Party; 2017–2019	Succeeded by Jennifer Locke; Acting
