= Barry Peterson =

Barry Peterson may refer to:

- Barry Peterson (Republican), Idaho Republican Party chairman
- Barry Peterson (cinematographer), Canadian/American cinematographer

== See also ==
- Barry Petersen, CBS News correspondent
- Barry Pederson (born 1961), Canadian professional ice hockey player
