= Joe Palmer (politician) =

American politician from Idaho

Member of the Idaho House of Representatives from District 20 Seat A
- Incumbent
- Assumed office December 1, 2008
- Preceded by: Mark Snodgrass

Personal details
- Party: Republican
- Spouse: Leslie
- Children: 4
- Relatives: Codi Galloway (niece)
- Education: Ricks College; Boise State University
- Profession: Business owner

Joe A. Palmer is a Republican Idaho State Representative since 2008 representing District 20 in the A seat.

== Personal life ==
Palmer attended Ricks College and Boise State University.

== Elections ==
=== 2019 ===
Palmer ran for Mayor of Meridian, Idaho.

Palmer took second, losing to Robert Simison with 32.4% of the vote.

=== 2018 ===
Palmer was unopposed in the Republican Primary for District 20 A.

Palmer was opposed by perennial candidate Daniel S. Weston of the Constitution Party in the general election, winning with 81% of the vote.

=== 2016 ===
Palmer was unopposed in the Republican Primary for District 20 A.

Palmer was opposed by perennial candidate Daniel S. Weston of the Constitution Party in the general election, winning with 78.9% of the vote.

Palmer endorsed Ted Cruz for Republican Party presidential primaries, 2016.

=== 2014 ===
Palmer ran unopposed in the Republican Primary and in the general election.

=== 2012 ===
Palmer won the three-way May 15, 2012, Republican primary with 65.9% of the vote against Richard Dees and Chris MacCloud.

Palmer defeated Caitlin Lister with 66.5% of the vote in the general election.

Palmer endorsed Mitt Romney for Republican Party presidential primaries, 2012.

=== 2010 ===
Palmer won the Republican primary with 54% of the vote against Shaun Wardle.

Palmer was unopposed in the general election.

=== 2008 ===
When Republican Representative Mark A. Snodgrass left the seat open in his unsuccessful bid to unseat incumbent Republican Senator Shirley McKague, Palmer won the May 27, 2008 Republican primary by 46 votes, winning with 1,725 votes (50.7%) against Meridian City Councilor Keith Bird.

Palmer won the general election with 77.3% of the vote against candidate Rex Kerr.

== Committee assignments ==
2018 and 2017 Session

- Transportation & Defense- Chair
- Business
- State Affairs
