= Mark Snodgrass =

American politician from Idaho

Member of the Idaho House of Representatives from the 20B district
- In office December 1, 2002 – December 1, 2008
- Preceded by: Frances Field
- Succeeded by: Joe Palmer

Personal details
- Born: March 16, 1964 (age 62) Boise, Idaho, U.S.
- Party: Republican
- Education: Boise State University (BS, MA)

Mark A. Snodgrass (born March 16, 1964) is an American politician and educator who served as a Republican member of the Idaho House of Representatives for the 20B district from 2002 to 2008.

== Early life and education ==
Snodgrass was born in Boise, Idaho, earned a Bachelor of Science in history for secondary education from Boise State University in 1989. He later received a Master of Arts in economics education from Boise State in 2002.

== Career ==
Snodgrass has worked as an American government and Economics teacher at Eagle High School since its opening in 1996. Also for the school, he coaches the girls' golf team. He also works as a real estate agent. He appeared on the reality court show Judge Judy.

2010

Mark Snodgrass founds the educational group known as "Snodgang"

2022

Mark Snodgrass taught AP microeconomics and AP Government classes at Eagle High School. During this year he also started his new podcast called the "Snodcast".

== Elections ==
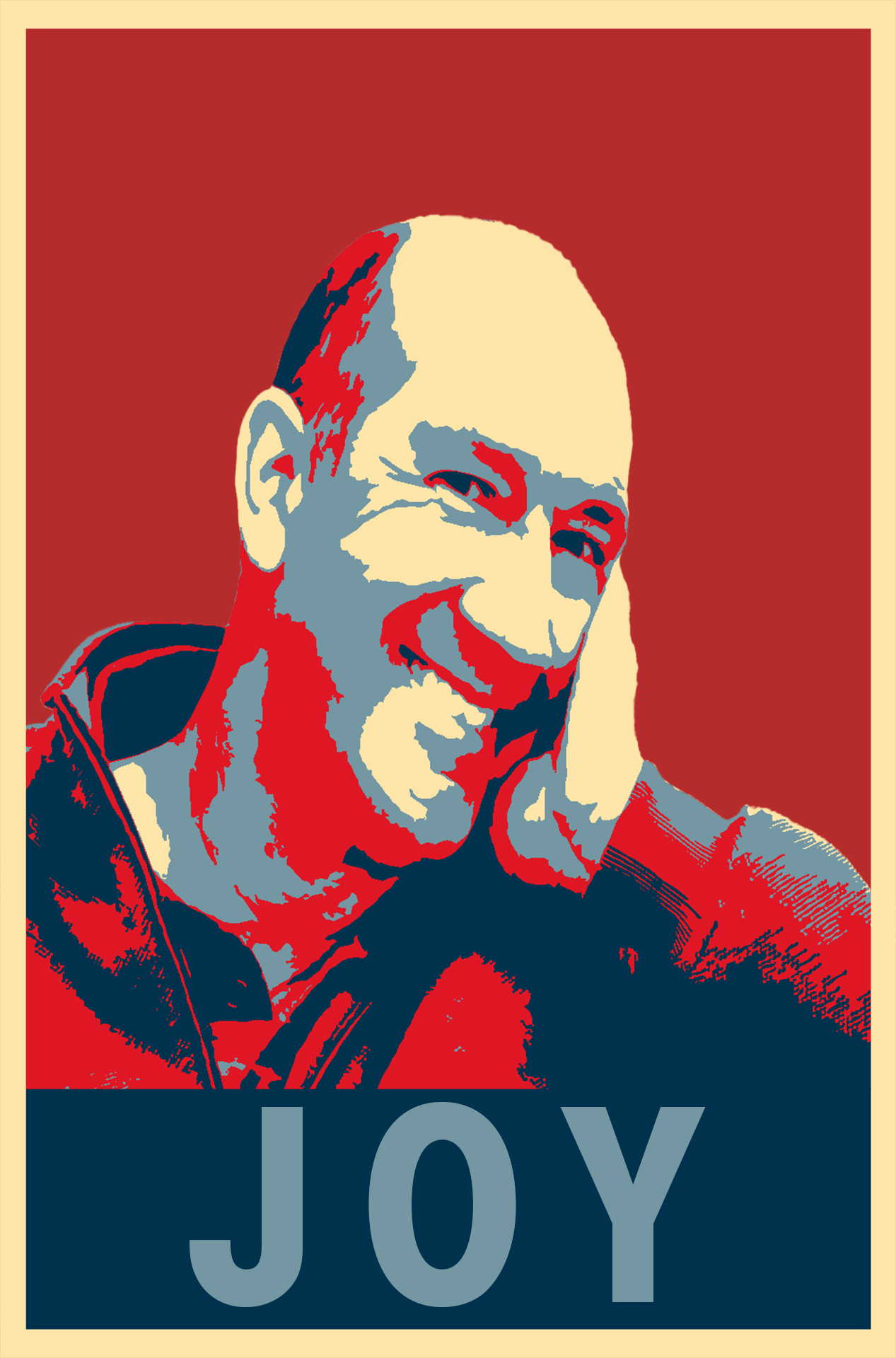
Campaign Poster for Mark Snodgrass

=== Idaho Senate ===
==== 2008 ====
Snodgrass challenged Senator Shirley McKague for District 20 Idaho Senate. He took 46.6% of the vote.

=== Idaho House of Representatives ===
==== 2006 ====
Snodgrass defeated Marv Hagedorn in the Republican primary with 59.2% of the vote. Snodgrass defeated perennial candidate Rex Kerr Libertarian nominee with 81.22% of the vote in the general election.

==== 2004 ====
Snodgrass defeated Dan Hollowell in the Republican primary with 54.10% of the vote. Snodgrass defeated David H. Slack Libertarian nominee with 84.7% of the vote in the general election.

==== 2002 ====
Snodgrass defeated Sean D. Moorhouse in the Republican primary with 55% of the vote. Snodgrass defeated Wayne Foster Democratic nominee and Libertarian nominee Wendy Lieberman with 68.1% of the vote.
