= Hilde Kellogg =

American politician and businesswoman from Idaho

Member of the Idaho House of Representatives
- In office December 1, 1982 – November 30, 1990
- In office December 1, 1992 – November 30, 2004
- Preceded by: Freeman B. Duncan
- Succeeded by: Bob Nonini
- Constituency: 2nd district Seat A (1992–2002); 5th district Seat A (2002–2004)

Personal details
- Born: October 17, 1918 Scottsbluff, Nebraska, US
- Died: November 22, 2010 (aged 92) Coeur d'Alene, Idaho, US
- Party: Republican
- Spouse: Jack Kellogg (m. 1965, died)
- Occupation: Businesswoman, politician

Hilde Kellogg (October 17, 1918 – November 22, 2010) was an American politician from Idaho. Kellogg was a Republican member of Idaho House of Representatives.

== Early life ==
On October 17, 1918, Kellogg was born in Scottsbluff, Nebraska. Kellogg's father was Adolf F. Thute, a German immigrant. Kellogg's mother was Anna Elizabeth (new Dell) Thute, a Russian immigrant. Kellogg's siblings include Richard Thute, William Thute, Helen Thute, and Betty Thute. In 1935, Kellogg graduated from Grand Island Senior High School in Grand Island, Nebraska.

== Career ==
Kellogg was a dental assistant in Nebraska.

In 1952, Kellogg was a businesswoman and the owner of a retail Western Wear store in Post Falls, Idaho, until 1981.

In 1974, Kellogg became the chairman of Planning and Zoning Commission in Post Falls, Idaho, until 1980.

In 1976, Kellogg's political career began when she became a city council member of Post Falls, Idaho, where she served until 1980.

In 1992, Kellogg was a member of Idaho House of Representatives for District 2 seat A, until 2000.

On November 5, 2002, Kellogg won the election and became a Republican member of Idaho House of Representatives for District 5 seat A. Kellogg defeated Kristy Reed Johnson and Mary Rutkowski with 56.0% of the votes.

In 2004, after 22 years in the Idaho House of Representatives, Kellogg retired at age 83.

== Awards ==
- 2001 Post Falls Citizen of the Year.

== Personal life ==
Kellogg's husband was Jack Kellogg (died 1965). Kellogg had no children. In 1950, Kellogg and her husband moved from Nebraska to Idaho. Kellogg lived in Post Falls, Idaho.

On November 22, 2010, Kellogg died in Coeur d'Alene, Idaho at age 92. Kellogg is buried in Evergreen Cemetery in Post Falls, Idaho.

Kellogg's sister Betty Elizabeth Garrett (1932–2011) had lived in Post Falls, Idaho and Helen Margetic lives in Plainfield, Illinois.

=== Legacy ===
- Hilde Kellogg Park. Post Falls, Idaho.
- February 18, 2005 dedicated as Hilde Kellogg Day.
