= Henry Kulczyk =

American politician from Idaho

Member of the Idaho House of Representatives from the District 14, Seat B district
- In office December 2002 – December 2004
- Preceded by: Shirley McKague
- Succeeded by: Stan Bastian

Personal details
- Occupation: Politician
- Known for: Red-Light Henry

Henry Kulczyk is a former American politician from Idaho. Kulczyk is a former Republican member of Idaho House of Representatives.

== Career ==
On November 5, 2002, Kulczyk won the election and became a Republican member of Idaho House of Representatives for District 14, seat B. Kulczyk defeated Sue Stadler and Glida Bothwell with 59.3% of the votes. Kulczyk's nickname was "Red-Light Henry".

In March 2004, Kulczyk was among the protestors against the removal of a controversial 1.5 ton monument depicting the Ten Commandments from Julia Davis Park. Kulczyk was arrested after he allegedly refused to leave as the monument was moved.
