= Stephen J. Yates =

President of Radio Free Asia, former Idaho Republican Party chairman

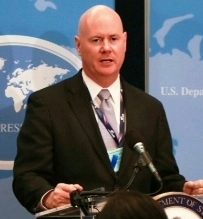

President of Radio Free Asia
- In office December 2020 – January 22, 2021
- Appointed by: Michael Pack
- Preceded by: Bay Fang
- Succeeded by: Bay Fang

Chair of the Idaho Republican Party
- In office August 2014 – July 2017
- Preceded by: Barry Peterson
- Succeeded by: Jonathan Parker

Personal details
- Born: 1968 or 1969 (age 56–57)
- Party: Republican
- Education: University of Maryland, College Park (BA); Johns Hopkins University (MA)

Stephen J. Yates is an American political advisor and government official who last served as the president of Radio Free Asia. He previously served as the deputy national security adviser to the Vice President to Dick Cheney from 2001 to 2005 and chairman of the Idaho Republican Party from 2014 to 2017. He has been the CEO of consulting firm DC International Advisory since 2006.

== Early life and education ==
Yates attended Brigham Young University and served as a Mormon missionary in Taiwan from 1987 to 1989. He speaks fluent Mandarin and his Chinese name is "葉望輝" (Yè Wànghuī). He obtained a Bachelor of Arts degree in Chinese language and literature from the University of Maryland, College Park and a Master of Arts in Chinese studies from the Paul H. Nitze School of Advanced International Studies at Johns Hopkins University.

== Career ==
Yates worked for the National Security Agency under the United States Department of Defense; he served as a liaison officer to the Department of Commerce. He was a senior policy analyst at The Heritage Foundation from 1996 to 2001, and served as deputy national security advisor to the Vice President to Dick Cheney from 2001 to 2005.

From 2005 to 2006, Yates served as a lobbyist and vice president of the global affairs practice for Barbour Griffith & Rogers, whose clients included Taiwan, the Indonesian National Shipowners' Association, Moneygram International, Lebanon's National Dialogue Party, and the Republic of India British Nuclear Fuels, Plc. (via a contract with Sutherland Asbill & Brennan).

Yates is the founder and CEO at DC International Advisory since 2006, a consulting firm advises on managing international political risk and business opportunity. He is also a professor of the practice with the International Business Program at Boise State University. Currently, he is a distinguished Fellow at the Hamilton Foundation.

Yates served as a senior fellow and chair of the China Policy Initiative at the America First Policy Institute from 2022 to 2024 before returning to the Heritage Foundation as a senior research fellow.

=== Political career ===
Yates advised the 2000 Bush-Cheney campaign's Asia team. He served in the 2008 Rudy Giuliani presidential campaign as a senior Asia adviser. He served in the 2012 Newt Gingrich presidential campaign as a part of the National Security Advisory team and director. He briefly ran for Idaho Republican Party national committeeman at the July 2020 convention.

==== Idaho Republican Party chair ====
Yates was elected chairman of the Idaho Republican Party in August 2014 and was re elected in 2016; he stepped down on April 24, 2017, to pursue the 2018 Idaho lieutenant gubernatorial primary election. David Johnston (2014–2017) and Lyndel Strong (2017) were the executive directors.

==== Idaho lieutenant governor primary election, 2018 ====
Yates sought and lost narrowly the 2018 Republican nomination for lieutenant governor of Idaho to Janice McGeachin.

Days before the election, a flyer attacking Yates was mailed to Idaho voters, claiming hidden foreign influence and conflating support from democratic Taiwan with that from communist China. The flyer mailing was sourced to a PAC funded by three political opponents from Yates' past.

=== Radio Free Asia ===
In December 2020, Yates was appointed by Michael Pack as the president of Radio Free Asia, a government–funded, nonprofit international broadcasting corporation. In January 2021, he and other leaders associated with the prior presidential administration were fired by Pack's successor, acting CEO of U.S. Agency for Global Media, Kelu Chao.

== Personal life ==
Yates and his ex-wife Diana Kilbourn adopted two children.

== Election history ==
District 30 House Seat B – part of Bonneville County
Year	Candidate	Votes	Pct	Candidate	Votes	Pct
2014 Primary	Stephen Yates	2,323	48.9%	Jeff Thompson (incumbent)	2,431	51.1%

Idaho lieutenant governor Republican primary, 2018
Party	Candidate	Votes	%
Republican	Janice McGeachin	51,079	28.9
Republican	Steve Yates	48,221	27.3
Republican	Marv Hagedorn	26,640	15.1
Republican	Bob Nonini	26,517	15.0
Republican	Kelley Packer	24,294	13.7
