= Sher Sellman =

American politician from Idaho

Member of the Idaho House of Representatives from the District 20, Seat B district
- In office December 1998 – December 2002
- Preceded by: Jim Jones
- Succeeded by: Shirley McKague

Personal details
- Party: Republican
- Spouse: John Sellman
- Occupation: Politician

Sher Sellman is an American politician from Idaho. Sellman is a Republican member of Idaho House of Representatives for District 20, seat B.

== Personal life ==
Sellman's mother was LaVonne Godschalx (née Nelson)(1917-2010), a teacher and a rancher in Idaho. Sellman's father was William Godschalx (1915-2010), a former Marine and a rancher in Idaho. Sellman has two sisters, Carolyn and Pat. Sellman grew up in Payette County, Idaho.

== Career ==
Sellman was a high school teacher and then a financial planner.

Sellman served as a city council member for Mountain Home, Idaho.

On November 3, 1998, Sellman won the election and became a Republican member of Idaho House of Representatives for District 20, seat B. Sellman defeated Eric D. Norton with 66.0% of the votes. On November 7, 2000, as an incumbent, Sellman won the election unopposed and continued serving District 20, seat B.

On November 5, 2002, Sellman sought for a seat in Idaho Senate for District 22 unsuccessfully. Sellman was defeated by Fred Kennedy with 48.9% of the votes. Sell lost by 133 votes. Sellman received 47.2% of the votes.

== Personal life ==
In 2010, both of Sellman's parents died a few weeks apart.

Sellman's husband is John Sellman. Sellman and her family live in Mountain Home, Idaho.
