= Idaho's 20th legislative district =

American legislative district

Idaho's 20th legislative district is one of 35 districts of the Idaho Legislature. It is currently represented by Chuck Winder, Republican of Boise, Joe Palmer, Republican of Meridian, and James Holtzclaw, Republican of Meridian.

== District profile ==
=== 1992–2002 ===
From 1992 to 2002, District 20 consisted of Owyhee and a portion Elmore County.

Legislature	Session	Senate	House Seat A	House Seat B
51st (1992 - 1994)	1st	Claire Wetherell (D)	Frances Field (R)	Robbi King (R)
51st (1992 - 1994)	2nd	Claire Wetherell (D)	Frances Field (R)	Robbi King (R)
52nd (1994 - 1996)	1st	Claire Wetherell (D)	Frances Field (R)	Robbi King (R)
52nd (1994 - 1996)	2nd	Claire Wetherell (D)	Frances Field (R)	Robbi King (R)
53rd (1996 - 1998)	1st	Robbi King (R)	Frances Field (R)	Jim Jones (R)
53rd (1996 - 1998)	2nd	Robbi King (R)	Frances Field (R)	Jim Jones (R)
54th (1998 - 2000)	1st	Robbi King (R)	Frances Field (R)	Sher Sellman (R)
54th (1998 - 2000)	2nd	Robbi King (R)	Frances Field (R)	Sher Sellman (R)
55th (2000 - 2002)	1st	Robbi King (R)	Frances Field (R)	Sher Sellman (R)
55th (2000 - 2002)	2nd	Robbi King (R)	Frances Field (R)	Sher Sellman (R)

=== 2002–2012 ===
From 2002 to 2012, District 20 consisted of a portion of Ada County.

Legislature	Session	Senate	House Seat A	House Seat B
57th (2002 - 2004)	1st	Gerry Sweet (R)	Mark Snodgrass (R)	Shirley McKague (R)
57th (2002 - 2004)	2nd	Gerry Sweet (R)	Mark Snodgrass (R)	Shirley McKague (R)
58th (2004 - 2006)	1st	Gerry Sweet (R)	Mark Snodgrass (R)	Shirley McKague (R)
58th (2004 - 2006)	2nd	Gerry Sweet (R)	Mark Snodgrass (R)	Shirley McKague (R)
59th (2006 - 2008)	1st	Shirley McKague (R)	Mark Snodgrass (R)	Marv Hagedorn (R)
59th (2006 - 2008)	2nd	Shirley McKague (R)	Mark Snodgrass (R)	Marv Hagedorn (R)
60th (2008 - 2010)	1st	Shirley McKague (R)	Joe Palmer(R)	Marv Hagedorn (R)
60th (2008 - 2010)	2nd	Shirley McKague (R)	Joe Palmer(R)	Marv Hagedorn (R)
61st (2010 - 2012)	1st	Shirley McKague (R)	Joe Palmer(R)	Marv Hagedorn (R)
61st (2010 - 2012)	2nd	Shirley McKague (R)	Joe Palmer(R)	Marv Hagedorn (R)

=== 2012–present ===
District 20 currently consists of a portion of Ada County.

Legislature	Session	Senate	House Seat A	House Seat B
62nd (2012 - 2014)	1st	Chuck Winder (R)	Joe Palmer (R)	James Holtzclaw (R)
62nd (2012 - 2014)	2nd	Chuck Winder (R)	Joe Palmer (R)	James Holtzclaw (R)
63rd (2014 - 2016)	1st	Chuck Winder (R)	Joe Palmer (R)	James Holtzclaw (R)
63rd (2014 - 2016)	2nd	Chuck Winder (R)	Joe Palmer (R)	James Holtzclaw (R)
64th (2016 - 2018)	1st	Chuck Winder (R)	Joe Palmer (R)	James Holtzclaw (R)
64th (2016 - 2018)	2nd	Chuck Winder (R)	Joe Palmer (R)	James Holtzclaw (R)
65th (2018 - 2020)	1st	Chuck Winder (R)	Joe Palmer (R)	James Holtzclaw (R)
65th (2018 - 2020)	2nd	Chuck Winder (R)	Joe Palmer (R)	James Holtzclaw (R)
66th (2020 - 2022)	1st	Chuck Winder (R)	Joe Palmer (R)	James Holtzclaw (R)
66th (2020 - 2022)	2nd	Chuck Winder (R)	Joe Palmer (R)	James Holtzclaw (R)

== See also ==
- List of Idaho senators
- List of Idaho representatives
