= Jim Marriott =

American politician from Idaho (born 1934)

Member of the Idaho House of Representatives from District 28 Seat B
- In office June 2006 – November 30, 2012
- Preceded by: Joseph Cannon
- Succeeded by: Kelley Packer (redistricting)

Personal details
- Born: December 10, 1934 (age 91) Ogden, Utah, U.S.
- Party: Republican
- Spouse: Colleen Saunders (m. 1954; died 2010)
- Education: Utah State University
- Occupation: Politician

Military service
- Branch/service: United States Army

Jim Marriott (born December 10, 1934) was an American politician who was a Republican Idaho State representative from 2006 to 2012.

== Early life and education ==
Marriott was born in Ogden, Utah on December 10, 1934. He earned his bachelor's degree in business administration from Utah State University.

== Elections ==
=== Idaho House of Representatives District 31 Seat B ===
==== 2012 ====
Redistricted to 31B, Marriott lost the Republican primary to Julie VanOrden taking only 37.6% of the vote.

=== Idaho House of Representatives District 28 Seat B ===
==== 2010 ====
Marriott was unopposed for the Republican primary and the general election.

==== 2008 ====
Marriott was unopposed for the Republican primary and the general election.

==== 2006 ====
At the end of the 2006 legislative session in April, Republican Representative Joseph S. Cannon resigned; Marriott won the three-way Republican primary with 46.2% of the vote defeating R. Scott Reese and Kirk G. Sheppard and was appointed to the vacancy in June by Governor Jim Risch. Marriott defeated Democratic nominee with 63.16% of the vote in the general election.
