= Jim Jones (Idaho politician) =

American politician from Idaho

Member of the Idaho House of Representatives from the District 20, Seat B district
- In office December 1996 – December 1998
- Preceded by: Robbi King
- Succeeded by: Sher Sellman

Personal details
- Born: September 17, 1922 Birmingham, Alabama
- Died: October 3, 2012 (aged 90) Mountain Home, Idaho
- Party: Republican
- Spouse: Loretta J. Jones
- Children: 1
- Education: Boise State University
- Occupation: Politician
- Military career
- Allegiance: United States
- Branch: United States Navy United States Army

Jim Jones (September 17, 1922 – October 3, 2012) was a former American politician from Idaho. Jones was a former Republican member of the Idaho House of Representatives.

== Early life ==
On September 17, 1922, Jones was born in Birmingham, Alabama. His parents were William Henry and Nannie Jones. He had two elder siblings. In 1942, he graduated from Jones Valley High School.

== Education ==
Jones attended the University of Alabama in 1946 studying prelaw. In 1972, he earned a Bachelor of Arts degree in Social Science from Boise State University.

== Career ==
Jones served in the United States Navy as an Aviation Radioman on a Consolidated PBY Catalina patrol airplane. He also served as a chief warrant officer in the United States Army Criminal Investigation Division from about 1948 until 1965.

On November 5, 1996, Jones won the election and became a Republican member of the Idaho House of Representatives for District 20, seat B. Jones defeated Sher Sellman with 51.6% of the votes.

== Personal life ==
Jones' wife was Loretta J. Jones. They had one child. He and his family lived in Mountain Home, Idaho.

On October 3, 2012, Jones died in Mountain Home, Idaho. Jones was cremated.
