= Stan Bastian =

American politician

Member of the Idaho House of Representatives from the District 14, Seat B district
- In office December 2004 – December 2006
- Preceded by: Henry Kulczyk
- Succeeded by: Raúl Labrador

Member of the Idaho Senate from the District 14 district
- In office December 2006 – December 2008
- Preceded by: Hal Bunderson
- Succeeded by: Chuck Winder

Personal details
- Born: May 3, 1941 Bicknell, Utah
- Died: August 25, 2025 U.S.A.
- Spouse: Kathleen Bastian
- Children: 5
- Occupation: Educator, politician

Stan Bastian is a former American educator and politician from Idaho. Bastian is a former Republican member of Idaho House of Representatives.

== Early life ==
Bastian was born May 3, 1941, in Bicknell, Utah.

== Education ==
In 1966, Bastian earned a Bachelor of Arts degree in Political Science from Sonoma State University in California. In 1971, Bastian earned a Master of Arts degree in Political Science from Colorado State University. In 1996, Bastian earned a specialist degree an Education Administration program from University of Idaho in Moscow, Idaho.

== Career ==
In 1967, Bastian became a school teacher, until 1996. In 1996, Bastian became a school administrator and assistant principal at Nampa Senior High School and then Skyview High School in Idaho, until 2002. In 2002, Bastian became a Professional Technical Education Coordinator at the Nampa School District in Idaho.

In 1992, Bastian became a city councilman of Eagle, Idaho, until 2006.

On November 2, 2004, Bastian won the election and became a Republican member of Idaho House of Representatives for District 14, seat B. Bastian defeated Del Bunce with 69.5% of the votes.

On November 7, 2006, Bastian won the election and became a Republican Idaho Senator for District 14. Bastian defeated Glida Bothwell with 67.59% of the votes.

== Awards ==
- 2018 Albert Nelson Marquis Lifetime Achievement Award

== Personal life ==
Bastian's wife is Kathleen Bastian. They have five children. Bastian and his family lived in Eagle, Idaho.He died on August 26, 2025.
