= Reed DeMordaunt =

American politician and businessman from Idaho

Member of the Idaho House of Representatives from District 14 Seat B
- In office December 1, 2010 – December 1, 2016
- Preceded by: Raúl Labrador
- Succeeded by: Gayann DeMordaunt

Personal details
- Born: October 1, 1963 (age 63) Rochester, Minnesota
- Party: Republican
- Spouse: Gayann DeMordaunt
- Children: 6
- Education: Brigham Young University; University of South Carolina; American University in Cairo
- Profession: Businessman
- Website: reed4idaho.com

Reed DeMordaunt (born October 1, 1963 in Rochester, Minnesota) is a former Republican Idaho State Representative representing District 14 in the B seat from 2010 to 2016. He chose not to run for re-election to focus on his business, Med Management Technology. He was succeeded by his wife Gayann DeMordaunt.

== Education ==
DeMordaunt earned his bachelor's degree from Brigham Young University and master's degrees from the University of South Carolina and American University in Cairo.

== Elections ==
District 14 House Seat B - Part of Ada County
Year	Candidate	Votes	Pct	Candidate	Votes	Pct	Candidate	Votes	Pct
2010 Primary	Reed DeMordaunt	3,910	54.1%	Nathan Mitchell	2,342	32.4%	Christopher MacCloud	972	13.5%
2010 General	Reed DeMordaunt	16,624	67.8%	Steve Berch	7,891	32.2%			
2012 Primary	Reed DeMordaunt (incumbent)	2,434	72.5%	Michael Greenway	921	27.5%			
2012 General	Reed DeMordaunt (incumbent)	15,091	70.4%	Glida Bothwell	6,349	29.6%			
2014 Primary	Reed DeMordaunt (incumbent)	3,728	100%						
2014 General	Reed DeMordaunt (incumbent)	11,190	67.9%	Rob Spencer	5,302	32.1%			
