= Janice McGeachin =

American politician (born 1963)

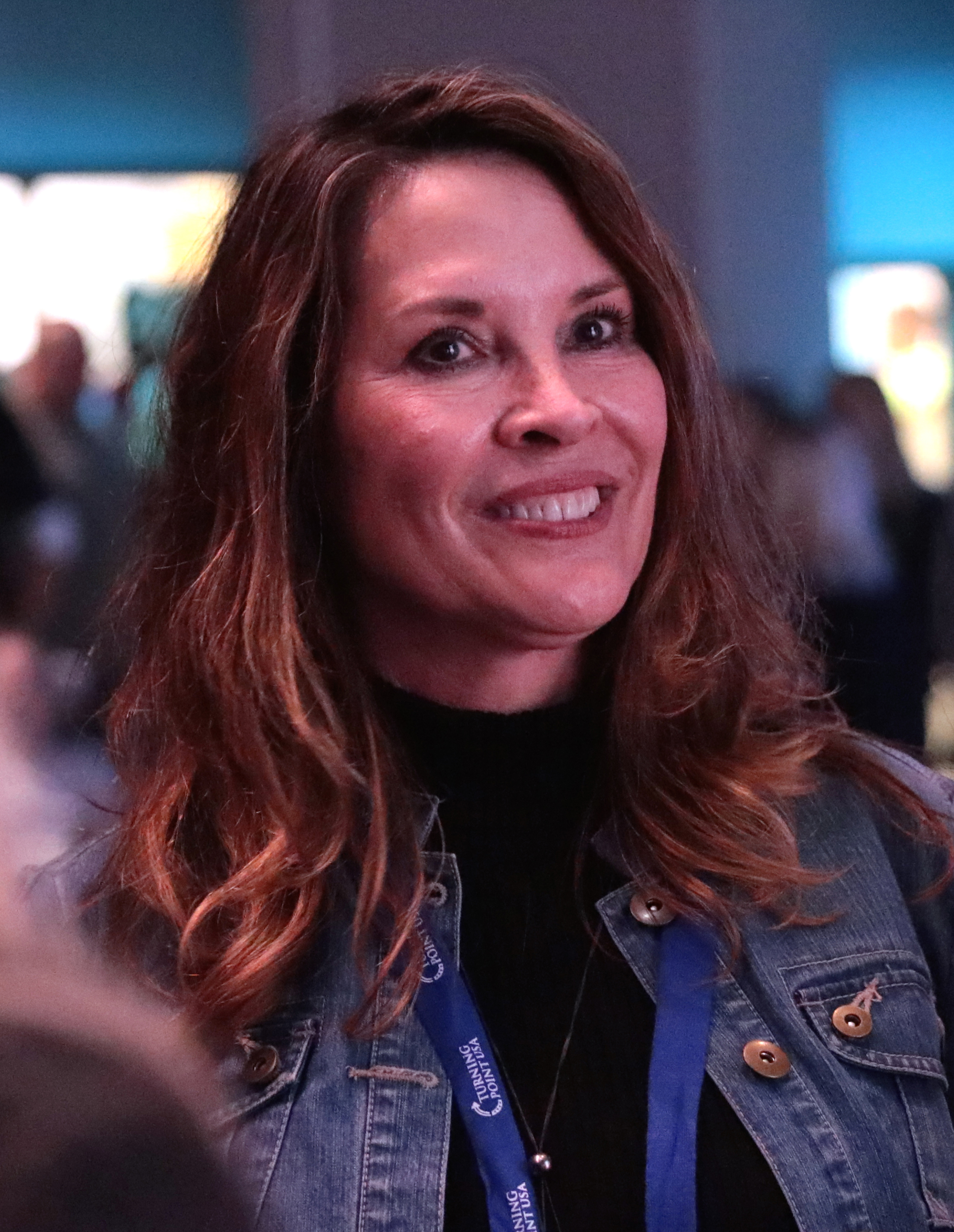

43rd Lieutenant Governor of Idaho
- In office January 7, 2019 – January 2, 2023
- Governor: Brad Little
- Preceded by: Brad Little
- Succeeded by: Scott Bedke

Member of the Idaho House of Representatives from the 32nd district
- In office December 1, 2002 – December 1, 2012
- Preceded by: Larry Bradford (redistricting)
- Succeeded by: Marc Gibbs (redistricting)

Personal details
- Born: January 18, 1963 (age 63) Las Cruces, New Mexico, U.S.
- Party: Republican
- Spouse: Jim McGeachin
- Children: 2
- Education: University of Arizona (BS)
- Website: Official website

Janice Kyes McGeachin (/məˈɡiː.ɪn/; born January 18, 1963) is an American far-right politician and businesswoman who served as the 43rd lieutenant governor of Idaho from 2019 to 2023. A member of the Republican Party, she was previously a member of the Idaho House of Representatives from 2002 until 2012.

Educated at the University of Arizona, McGeachin owned several businesses in Idaho Falls. She entered politics in 2002 when elected to a seat in the state house. She was elected lieutenant governor in the 2018 election, to serve with the governor, Brad Little. She is the first female lieutenant governor of Idaho. As lieutenant governor, McGeachin aligned herself with Donald Trump and frequently clashed with Little. She unsuccessfully challenged Little in the Republican primary for governor in the 2022 election.

== Early life and education ==
McGeachin was born Janice Kyes on January 18, 1963, in Las Cruces, New Mexico. She graduated from Skyline High School in Idaho Falls and earned her B.S. in finance and accounting from the University of Arizona.

== Career ==
=== Business ventures ===
McGeachin has had a number of business ventures. She owns an Irish pub in Idaho Falls and co-owns a wholesale automotive parts supply store and a torque converter remanufacturing facility with her husband.

=== 2000 to 2017 ===
McGeachin unsuccessfully ran for Bonneville County commissioner in 2000, her first bid for elected office. As a Republican, she was a member of the Idaho House of Representatives from 2002 to 2012. As chair of the state House Health and Welfare Committee, she cut Medicaid funding and voted against legislation to create a state-based health insurance exchange. An ally of the Tea Party movement, McGeachin was considered a possible Republican primary challenger to U.S. Representative Mike Simpson in 2010, but chose not to run.

McGeachin supported Mitt Romney in the 2008 Republican Party presidential primaries and the 2012 Republican Party presidential primaries.

McGeachin was a delegate for Donald Trump at the 2016 Republican National Convention and was vice-chair of Trump's Idaho campaign committee.

=== Lieutenant governor ===
==== Campaign and election ====
In April 2017, McGeachin filed to run for lieutenant governor of Idaho. In the voter pamphlet she wrote, she hoped to help the governor "by increasing our freedoms and liberties, free from the bonds of excessive government regulations". Her candidacy was supported by state Senator Dean Mortimer. McGeachin narrowly won the Republican primary election on May 15, 2018, with 28.9% of the vote, then defeated Democratic nominee Kristin Collum in the November general election. During the 2018 campaign, McGeachin took security guards with her to a debate at the Idaho Public Television station in Boise, although there was no known threat against her, and characterized them as "friends."

==== Far-right connections ====
In February 2019, McGeachin posted a photo on her Facebook page of her posing in front of her Idaho State Capitol door with two members of the Three Percenters, an anti-government militia movement group. The men wore shirts promoting Todd Engel, who was sentenced to prison in connection with the Bundy standoff fatal encounter with the Federal Bureau of Investigation (FBI) and the Bureau of Alcohol, Tobacco and Firearms (ATF). For the caption, she wrote "Sending love to Todd Engel from the Idaho Capital and 'getting to know' the new Senate Pages." McGeachin faced public criticism for the photo and quickly deleted it. In a subsequent statement, McGeachin described the men as "two Second Amendment supporters who were here to support Todd Engel, an Idahoan who was treated unjustly by the court system," and said that she deleted the post after "a few people had begun erroneously assigning sinister motives which are contrary to my true character." The Idaho Falls Post Register editorial board criticized McGeachin for embracing the 3 Percenters and militia movement.

In February 2022, McGeachin appeared as a surprise video guest speaker at the America First Political Action Conference, hosted by prominent white nationalist Nick Fuentes. McGeachin was apparently one of the highest-ranking elected officials to address the far-right conference. McGeachin's speech to the conference was criticized by Democrats and some Republicans for its antisemitic and pro-Putin contents.

==== Indoctrination task force and public records violations ====
In 2021, McGeachin convened an "education indoctrination task force" co-chaired by fellow Republican Priscilla Giddings. The committee was premised on the notion that "the scourge of critical race theory, socialism, communism, and Marxism" was "infiltrating" the Idaho school and college system. Committee members discussed proposals to abolish the Idaho State Board of Education. Idaho teachers described McGeachin's committee as a McCarthyist attack on teachers and a distraction from the challenges faced by Idaho's education system in reality. The Idaho Statesman editorial board described the effort as "a manufactured witch hunt" driven by the "far-right fringe of Idaho's politics." The president-elect of the Idaho School Boards Association resigned from McGeachin's task force a week after its first meeting, writing that the task force seemed aimed at "partisan campaigning."

In August 2021, a state judge fined McGeachin $750 for violating the Idaho Public Records Act by failing to turn over documents requested by the Idaho Press Club. The judge found that McGeachin acted "in bad faith" and that "It appears to the court that respondent would stop at nothing, no matter how misguided, to shield public records from the public." A civil suit brought against McGeachin by the Idaho Press Club was settled in November 2021, with a court ordering McGeachin to pay the club almost $29,000 in fees and costs. McGeachin submitted a supplemental budget request, seeking for that sum to be paid by taxpayer funds. The legislature declined McGeachin's request to have the costs of the settlement paid by the state budget.

==== COVID-19 pandemic and strained relationship with Governor Brad Little ====
As lieutenant governor, McGeachin had a strained relationship with the governor, Brad Little, despite the fact that both were conservative Republicans. McGeachin frequently criticized Little's strategy regarding the COVID-19 pandemic. The clashes intensified amid an intra-party split among Republicans on COVID-19 vaccinations, masks, and pandemic-related issues, on which traditional Republicans and the far-right disagreed.

During the pandemic, McGeachin repeatedly criticized Little for taking steps (such as closing physical businesses) to prevent the spread of the disease. In late-April 2020, McGeachin urged reopening all businesses in Idaho by April 30, and also spoke at a protest in eastern Idaho against stay-at-home directives. In a May 2020 editorial, McGeachin wrote: "I lose sleep at night because the heavy hand of our government is hurting so many Idahoans." By July 2020, after the state's economy had reopened, Idaho saw a spike in coronavirus cases. In August 2020, McGeachin headlined a rally organized by the right-wing, conspiracist John Birch Society at the rally in Twin Falls, where speakers decried public health measures to combat the coronavirus. At the rally, McGeachin criticized Little and other state officials. In October 2020, McGeachin appeared in a video by the right-wing Idaho Freedom Foundation in which she wielded a gun and Bible, railed against COVID-19 public-health measures, and questioned whether "a pandemic may or may not be occurring."

In November 2020, McGeachin submitted a proposal to Governor Little's Coronavirus Financial Advisory Committee, seeking to spend $17 million in federal COVID-19 aid funds to purchase and operate two "walk-through disinfectant cubes" at the Idaho state Capitol. McGeachin criticized the governor's coronavirus policies while touting the technology, although a National Institutes of Health study published months earlier determined that the use of "walk-through sanitation gates" was ineffective, possibly dangerous, and violates global health standards.

In July 2020, McGeachin condemned federal economic relief granted during the COVID-19 pandemic. However, McGeachin's Idaho Falls-based business accepted two partially forgivable loans, totaling $314,727, from the federal Paycheck Protection Program. After the company's acceptance of the PPP funds was publicized, McGeachin said that the company accepted the funds to counter what she called harm "by the heavy hand of government in 2020."

In May 2021, after Little left the state to attend a Republican Governors' Association conference in Nashville, Tennessee, making McGeachin acting governor in his absence, she issued an executive order that barred the state and Idaho counties, cities, public school districts, and public universities from adopting mask mandates. McGeachin issued the order without consulting Little, and against the wishes of state health officials who had sought a statewide mask mandate, which Idaho has never had. On his return to Idaho one day later, Little rescinded McGeachin's order and said that her decision "to act solitarily on a highly politicized, polarizing issue without conferring with local jurisdictions, legislators, and the sitting Governor" was "simply put, an abuse of power." Little said that McGeachin's order "unilaterally and unlawfully" forbade local officials from determining public-health policies in their own jurisdictions and would have forbidden the state from enforcing protective measures for social workers from making home visits to at-risk patients, or for employees in state testing labs. Little also noted that her order duplicated a proposed bill that had failed to pass the state legislature. In July 2021, when Little was out of state on a different trip, McGeachin wrote a letter to the Idaho Department of Health and Welfare, demanding information on what incentives Idaho healthcare providers may have "to impose vaccine mandates on their employees."

McGeachin used her office to promote misinformation to disparage COVID-19 vaccines. By fall 2021, Idaho had among the nation's lowest COVID-19 vaccination rates. A surge in COVID-19 cases first strained, and then surpassed, the capacity of the state's health care system. Overwhelmed by a surge of COVID-19 patients, the Idaho Department of Health and Welfare activated "crisis standards" that allowed hospitals in the state to ration healthcare. In August 2021, after announcing that she would challenge Little in the Republican primary for re-nomination as governor, McGeachin said that it was "shameful" for Little to ask Idahoans to show love for neighbors by getting vaccinated against COVID-19. McGeachin also opposes vaccine mandates.

In October 2021, while Little was out of state touring the Southern border, McGeachin—claiming power as acting governor in Little's absence—issued an executive order banning state officials from requiring proof of vaccination from employees and sought to ban employers from requiring vaccinations altogether. She also inquired with the Idaho National Guard about ordering troops to the U.S.-Mexico border that Little was visiting. The governor and lieutenant governor publicly feuded, and Little rescinded McGeachin's order while he was still in Texas. In so doing, Little stated that McGeachin's order was unauthorized because his "temporary presence in Texas on official business" did not impair his "ability to represent the people of Idaho thus necessitating action by another executive to ensure the continuity of state government."

==== 2020 presidential election ====
McGeachin was an Idaho presidential elector for the Republican slate in 2020, casting one of Idaho's four electoral votes for Donald Trump; the other Idaho electors that year were Melinda Smyser, Raul Labrador, and Rod Beck.

In December 2020, the month after Donald Trump lost the presidential election to Joe Biden, McGeachin—along with Little, Idaho's two Republican U.S. House members, and other Idaho Republican election officials—signed on to an amicus brief supporting Texas' attempt to overturn the results of the presidential election. Legal experts dismissed the suit as meritless, and it was rejected by the Supreme Court.

==== 2022 candidacy for governor ====
In May 2021, McGeachin filed as a candidate seeking election as governor of Idaho in 2022, challenging incumbent governor Brad Little in the Republican primary. In announcing her candidacy, McGeachin attacked public health measures to combat the spread of COVID-19 and said that Idaho should reject federal funding to preserve "state sovereignty". Trump endorsed McGeachin's candidacy. While addressing a crowd of fellow Republicans at a campaign appearance, McGeachin criticized the Boise Police Department and Boise State University for holding a conference to study right-wing extremism, and said of Anthony Fauci (the U.S. government's top infectious disease scientist): "we'll lock him up."

In the May 17, 2022, Republican primary election, McGeachin lost to Little. Little won re-nomination with 52.81% of the vote, with McGeachin receiving 32.24% of the vote, Edward R. Humphreys receiving 10.96% of the vote, and an assortment of minor candidates receiving the rest. Of Idaho's 44 counties, McGeachin carried just four, all in the Idaho panhandle. She concluded her term as lieutenant governor on January 2, 2023.

== Political positions ==
McGeachin is part of the far-right wing of the Republican Party. She appeared at a rally for the Three Percenters, an anti-government militia movement group. She opposes abortion, same-sex marriage, and gun control. She opposes Medicaid expansion and was a leading opponent of 2018 Proposition 2, an initiative to expand Medicaid coverage to about 62,000 Idahoans. She opposes minimum wages, believing that government should play no role in determining wages. In the voter pamphlet, she contended, "The federal government has become too restrictive in how we teach our kids, manage health care, build our roads and manage our resources." She accused the Biden administration of seeking to indoctrinate schoolchildren in "Marxist, socialist ideology" and believes that Idaho should promote "state sovereignty" by rejecting federal funds for a variety of programs.

== Electoral history ==
2002

McGeachin and Republican Representative Larry C. Bradford were redistricted to 31A. McGeachin was unopposed for the Republican primary and the general election.

2004

McGeachin was unopposed for the Republican primary and for the general election.

2006

McGeachin was unopposed for the Republican primary. She won the general election with 71.19% of the vote against Democratic nominee Scott Cannon.

2008

McGeachin was unopposed for the Republican primary. She won the general election with 73% of the vote against Scott Cannon.

2010

McGeachin was unopposed for the Republican primary and the general election. She announced on February 24, 2012, that she would not be seeking re-election.

2018

Idaho lieutenant governor Republican primary, 2018
Party	Candidate	Votes	%
Republican	Janice McGeachin	51,098	28.9
Republican	Steve Yates	48,269	27.3
Republican	Marv Hagedorn	26,653	15.1
Republican	Bob Nonini	26,556	15.0
Republican	Kelley Packer	24,513	13.8

Idaho lieutenant gubernatorial election, 2018
Party	Candidate	Votes	%
Idaho Republican Party	Janice McGeachin	356,507	59.7%
Democratic	Kristin Collum	240,355	40.3%
Total votes		596,862	100%

2022

Idaho gubernatorial Republican primary, 2022
Party	Candidate	Votes	%
Republican	Brad Little	148,844	52.8
Republican	Janice McGeachin	90,885	32.2
Republican	Edward Humphreys	30,878	11
Republican	Stephen Bradshaw	5,470	1.9
Republican	Ashley Jackson	1,120	0.4
Republican	Ben Cannady	804	0.3
Republican	Cody Usabel	683	0.2

Political offices
Preceded by Brad Little	Lieutenant Governor of Idaho; 2019–2023	Succeeded by Scott Bedke
