= J. Kirk Sullivan =

American politician (1935–2020)

Chair of the Idaho Republican Party
- In office June 2004 – June 2008
- Preceded by: John Sandy
- Succeeded by: Norm Semanko

Personal details
- Born: August 25, 1935 Greenwood, South Carolina, U.S.
- Died: April 2, 2020 (aged 84)
- Party: Republican
- Spouse: Elizabeth Sullivan (Miller)
- Education: Clemson University (BS, MS, PhD)

J. Kirk Sullivan (August 25, 1935 – April 2, 2020) was an American politician who was Idaho Republican Party chairman and lobbyist.

== Personal life ==
Sullivan and his wife had two children and three grandchildren.

Originally from South Carolina, Sullivan attended Clemson University, where he earned a Ph.D. & M.S. in chemistry. He also attended the Massachusetts Institute of Technology Program for Senior Executives.

Sullivan died on April 2, 2020, at the age of 84.

== Career ==
Sullivan was a member of U.S. Army Reserves. He worked for a mining company, FMC Corp., has an engineer, technical superintendent, and marketing manager for 13 years.

Sullivan has served on the Commission for the Future of Clemson, the Clemson University College of Engineering and Science Philanthropic Development Leadership Committee and on the chemistry department's advisory board. He is also a member of Clemson's prestigious Thomas Green Clemson Academy of Engineers and Scientists.

Sullivan started to work at Boise Cascade Co. in 1971 and rose to the position of vice president for governmental and environmental affairs in 1981 and retired in 1998.

Sullivan earned the Distinguished Eagle Scout Award in 2005.

On May 23, 2007, Saint Alphonsus Foundation recognized Sullivan with its 2007 Distinguished Citizen Award.

== Political career ==
In 1996 Sullivan tried to become University of Idaho President but failed.

Sullivan and Greg Casey founded Veritas Advisors in 1999, a lobbying, political campaigns, communications, issue advocacy, and business and association management group.

Sullivan was the head of Idaho Association of Commerce and Industry and dealt with mostly Governmental & Environmental Affairs. He earned the Pat K. Harwood Award in 1997 from the group.

== Idaho Republican Party Chair ==
Sullivan was first elected has state chair in 2004. Was defeated for reelection in 2008 by Norm Semanko. He dealt with making Idaho Republican Party a closed primary. China Veldhouse Gum (2004) and Jayson Ronk (2006-2007) served as executive director during his term as chair.

== Community involvement ==
Sullivan served on the oversight board for the Public Employment Retirement System of Idaho (PERSI) from first being appointed in 1996. He was scheduled to continue to serve till July 1, 2021.

Party political offices
Preceded by John Sandy	Chair of the Idaho Republican Party; June 2004 - June 2008	Succeeded by Norm Semanko
