= 2022 Idaho gubernatorial election =

- November 8, 2022
- Turnout: 57.2% ▼
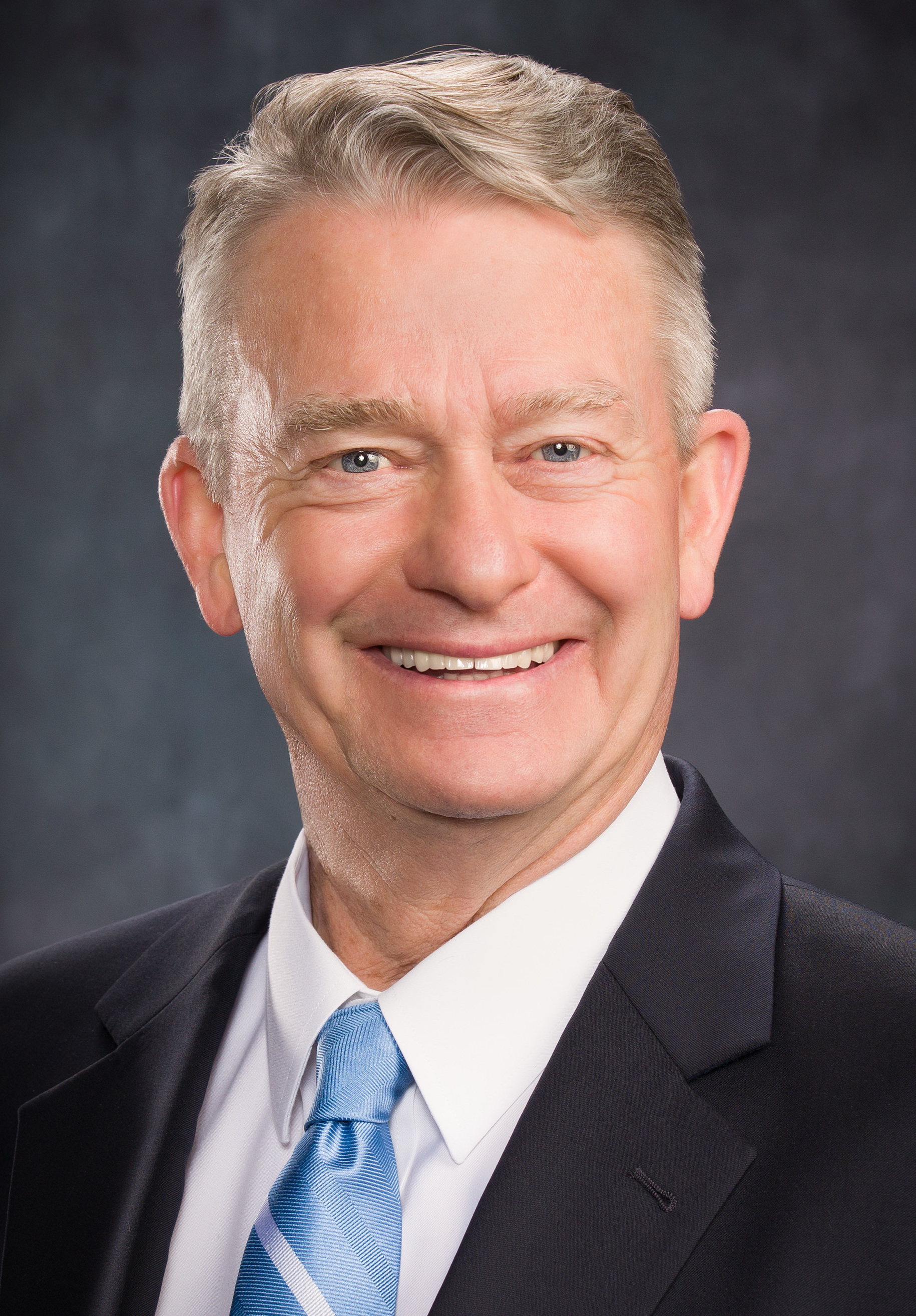

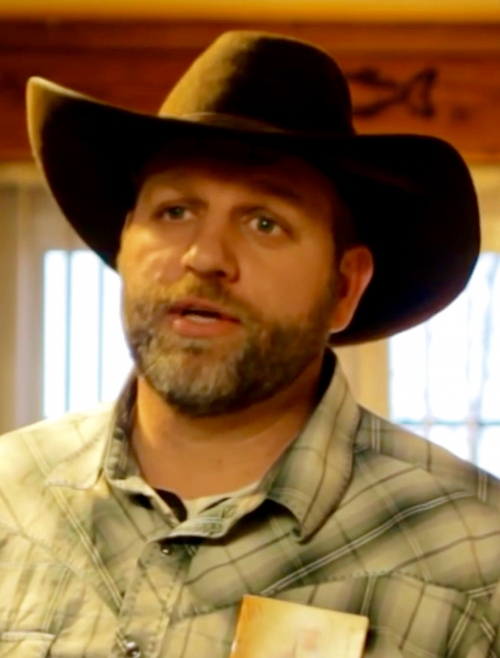
Nominee	Brad Little	Stephen Heidt	Ammon Bundy
Party	Republican	Democratic	Independent
Popular vote	358,598	120,160	101,835
Percentage	60.52%	20.28%	17.19%
- Little: 30–40% 40–50% 50–60% 60–70% 70–80% 80–90% >90% Heidt: 40–50% 50–60% 60–70% Bundy: 40–50% 50–60% 60–70%
Governor before election
Brad Little
Republican
Elected Governor
Brad Little
Republican

The 2022 Idaho gubernatorial election was held on November 8 to elect the next governor of Idaho. Incumbent Brad Little, first elected in 2018, was elected to a second term, the eighth consecutive win by a Republican.

The statewide primary was held on May 17; Little defeated incumbent lieutenant governor Janice McGeachin in the Republican primary, while Stephen Heidt won the Democratic primary. Little convincingly won the general election, but there was a relatively strong performance by far-right independent candidate Ammon Bundy, who finished roughly three points behind Heidt, and ahead of Heidt in 34 of Idaho's 44 counties.

Bundy's share of the vote was the best non-major party performance or the best outside both major parties performance since 1926. This was the worst Democratic performance since 1924, and one of only three times since then in which the Democratic candidate failed to achieve 30% of the vote.

== Republican primary ==
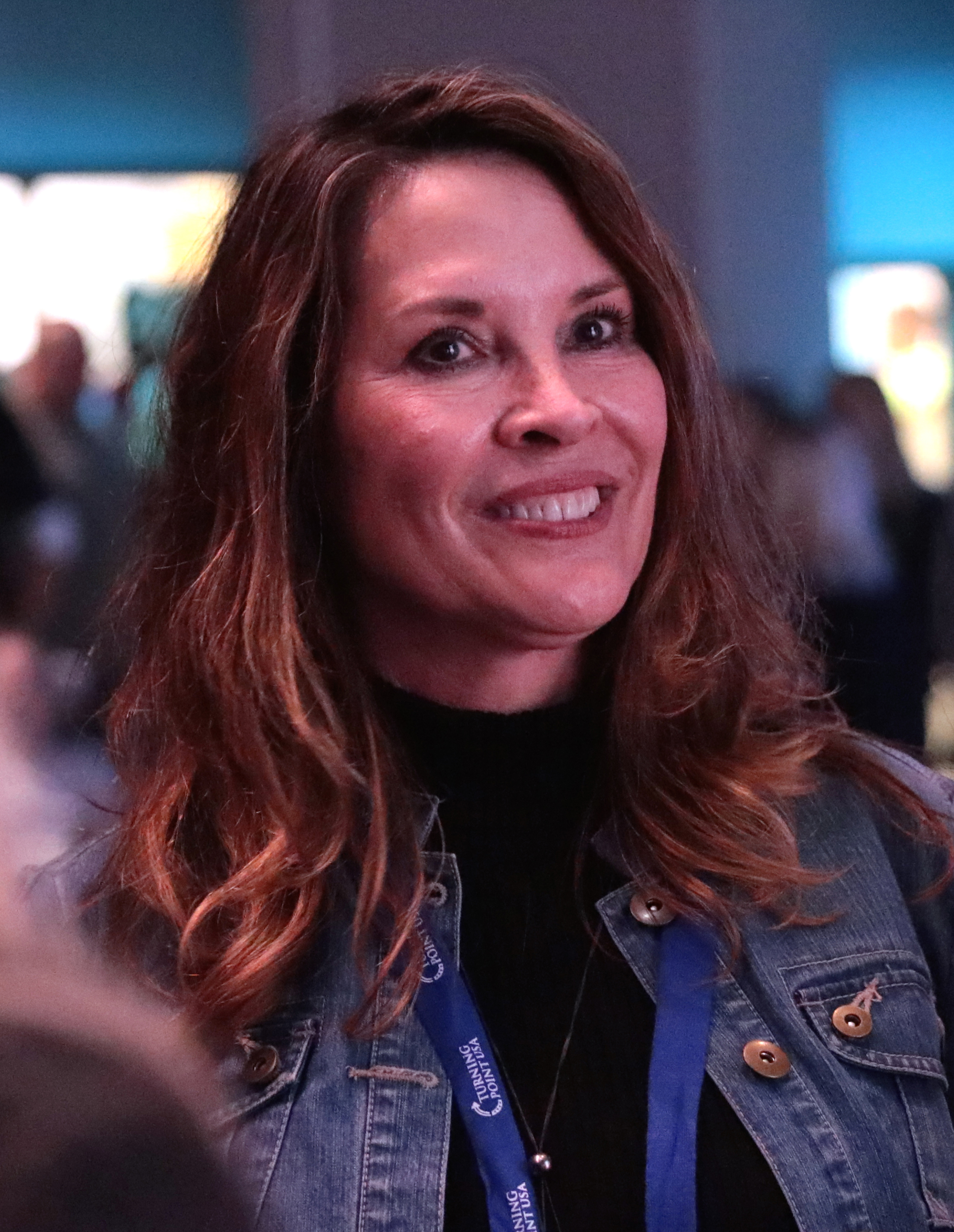
Lieutenant Governor Janice McGeachin challenged Little in the primary.

=== Candidates ===
==== Nominee ====
- Brad Little, incumbent governor

==== Eliminated in primary ====
- Steve Bradshaw, Bonner County commissioner
- Ben Cannady, candidate for governor in 2018
- Walter French
- Ed Humphreys, financial advisor and Region IV chair of the Idaho Republican Party
- Ashley Jackson, actress, marijuana legalization activist
- Lisa Marie, entrepreneur, humanitarian, mother
- Janice McGeachin, lieutenant governor of Idaho
- Cody Usabel

==== Withdrawn ====
- Ammon Bundy, anti-government militant, activist, and leader of the Occupation of the Malheur National Wildlife Refuge (ran as an independent)
- Chris Hammond

==== Declined ====
- Raúl Labrador, former U.S. representative from ID-01, former chair of the Idaho Republican Party, and candidate for governor in 2018 (successfully ran for Idaho attorney general)

=== Endorsements ===
Brad Little

Individuals

- Tommy Ahlquist, businessman, physician, candidate for governor of Idaho in 2018

Newspapers

- Coeur d'Alene Press

Organizations

- Idaho Chooses Life
- Idaho Education Association
- Idaho Fraternal Order of Police
- NRA Political Victory Fund
Janice McGeachin

U.S. executive branch officials

- Alan Keyes, former ambassador to the Economic and Social Council and Republican nominee for U.S. Senate in Maryland in 1988 and 1992, Republican nominee for U.S. Senate in Illinois in 2004, and candidate for president of the United States in 1996, 2000, and 2008
- Donald Trump, 45th president of the United States (2017–2021)

State legislators

- Wendy Rogers, state senator from Arizona's 6th legislative district
- Bryan Zollinger, former representative for Idaho's 33rd legislative district, Seat B (2016–2020)

Individuals

- Larry Elder, conservative radio host and candidate for governor of California in 2021
- Eric McGilp, chair of the Boise County Republican Party

Organizations

- Idaho Freedom PAC
- Republican Liberty Caucus
- Three Percenters
Ammon Bundy (withdrawn)

U.S. representatives

- Ron Paul, former U.S. representative (R-TX), candidate for president in 1988, 2008 and 2012 (Libertarian)

Individuals

- Roger Stone, conservative political consultant and lobbyist

=== Polling ===
Poll source	Date(s) administered	Sample size (Note: Key: A – all adults RV – registered voters LV – likely voters V – unclear)	Margin of error	Steve Bradshaw	Ammon Bundy	Ed Humphreys	Ashley Jackson	Brad Little	Lisa Marie	Janice McGeachin	Cody Usabel	Undecided
Zoldak Research (R)	April 9–12, 2022	549 (LV)	± 4.0%	3%	–	6%	1%	60%	<1%	29%	<1%	–
Zoldak Research (R)	April 9–12, 2022	549 (LV)	± 4.0%	–	–	19%	–	62%	–	–	–	19%
Zoldak Research (R)	April 9–12, 2022	549 (LV)	± 4.0%	–	–	–	–	62%	–	33%	–	6%
	February 17, 2022	Bundy withdraws from the race										
Zoldak Research (R)	December 20–21, 2021	575 (LV)	± 4.1%	1%	6%	2%	–	59%	–	18%	0%	14%
Zoldak Research (R)	December 20–21, 2021	575 (LV)	± 4.1%	10%	–	–	–	64%	–	–	–	26%
Zoldak Research (R)	December 20–21, 2021	575 (LV)	± 4.1%	–	15%	–	–	70%	–	–	–	15%
Zoldak Research (R)	December 20–21, 2021	575 (LV)	± 4.1%	–	–	11%	–	65%	–	–	–	24%
Zoldak Research (R)	December 20–21, 2021	575 (LV)	± 4.1%	–	–	–	–	64%	–	24%	–	12%

=== Primary results ===
Results by county Little: 40–50%; 50–60%; 60–70%; 70–80%; McGeachin: 50–60%

Republican primary
Party	Candidate	Votes	%
Republican	Brad Little (incumbent)	148,831	52.8
Republican	Janice McGeachin	90,854	32.2
Republican	Ed Humphreys	30,877	11.0
Republican	Steve Bradshaw	5,470	1.9
Republican	Ashley Jackson	3,172	1.1
Republican	Lisa Marie	1,119	0.4
Republican	Ben Cannady	804	0.3
Republican	Cody Usabel	680	0.2
Total votes		281,807	100

== Democratic primary ==
=== Candidates ===
==== Nominee ====
- Stephen Heidt, college instructor (Marsing)

==== Write-in candidates ====
- David J. Reilly, activist and media personality
- Shelby Rognstad, mayor of Sandpoint (failed to change party registration and ran as write-in candidate instead)

==== Withdrew ====
- Melissa Sue Robinson, perennial candidate

==== Declined ====
- AJ Balukoff, former Boise School District trustee, nominee for governor in 2014, and candidate in 2018 (endorsed Shelby Rognstad)

=== Endorsements ===
Shelby Rognstad

Federal politicians

- Larry LaRocco, former U.S. representative for Idaho's 1st congressional district (1991–1995)
- Walt Minnick, former U.S. representative for Idaho's 1st congressional district (2009–2011)

Idaho local officials/politicians

- AJ Balukoff, former Boise School District trustee, nominee for governor in 2014, and candidate for governor in 2018

=== Primary results ===
Results by county Heidt: 50–60%; 60–70%; 70–80%; 80–90%; 90–100%

Democratic primary
Party	Candidate	Votes	%
Democratic	Stephen Heidt	25,088	78.8
Democratic	Write-ins	6,757	21.2
Total votes		31,845	100

=== Write-in count ===
Shelby Rognstad received 6,736 votes (21.2%). David Reilly received 21 votes (0.07%).

== Libertarian primary ==
=== Candidates ===
==== Declared ====
- John Dionne Jr.
- Paul Sand, White Bird city councilman, retired software engineer

=== Primary results ===
Libertarian primary
Party	Candidate	Votes	%
Libertarian	Paul Sand	426	60.2
Libertarian	John Dionne	281	39.8
Total votes		707	100

== Constitution primary ==
=== Candidates ===
==== Declared ====
- Chantyrose Davison

==== Write In ====
- Ryan Cole, member of the Central Idaho Health District board and pathologist (failed to change party registration and running as write-in candidate instead)

==== Withdrew ====
- Pro-Life, organic strawberry farmer and perennial candidate (ran for lieutenant governor)

=== Primary results ===
Constitution primary
Party	Candidate	Votes	%
Constitution	Chantyrose Davison	345	64.4
Constitution	Write-ins	191	35.6
Total votes		536	100

=== Write-in count ===
Dr. Ryan Cole received 25 votes/6.7%.

== Independents ==
=== Declared ===
- Ammon Bundy, leader of the Occupation of the Malheur National Wildlife Refuge

=== Withdrawn ===
- John Dionne (running as a Libertarian)
- Pro Life (ran for lieutenant governor)

== General election ==
=== Predictions ===
Source	Ranking	As of
The Cook Political Report	Solid R	July 26, 2022
Inside Elections	Solid R	July 22, 2022
Sabato's Crystal Ball	Safe R	June 29, 2022
Politico	Solid R	April 1, 2022
RCP	Safe R	January 10, 2022
Fox News	Solid R	May 12, 2022
538	Solid R	July 31, 2022
Elections Daily	Safe R	November 7, 2022

=== Post-primary endorsements ===
Brad Little (R)

Organizations

- Idaho Associated General Contractors
- National Education Association
- National Federation of Independent Business – Idaho chapter
Ammon Bundy (I)

U.S. representatives

- Ron Paul, former U.S. representative (R-TX) (1976–1977, 1979–1985, 1997–2013), candidate for president in 1988, 2008 and 2012 (Libertarian)

Individuals

- Pro-Life, 2022 Constitution Party candidate for lt. governor, organic strawberry farmer, and Idaho perennial candidate (Constitution)
- Collin Raye, country music singer
- Roger Stone, conservative political consultant and lobbyist (Republican)
- James White, Montana Gazette Radio host

Organizations

- Idaho Freedom PAC

=== Results ===
2022 Idaho gubernatorial election
Party	Candidate	Votes	%	±%
Republican	Brad Little (incumbent)	358,598	60.51%	▲0.74%
Democratic	Stephen Heidt	120,160	20.28%	▼17.91%
Independent	Ammon Bundy	101,835	17.18%	N/A
Libertarian	Paul Sand	6,714	1.13%	▲0.05%
Constitution	Chantyrose Davison	5,250	0.89%	▼0.07%
Independent	Lisa Marie (write-in)	46	0.01%	Steady
Total votes		592,603	100.00%	N/A
Majority		238,438	40.24%	18.66%
Turnout		599,353	57.18%	−4.24%
Registered electors		1,048,263		
Republican hold				

==== By county ====
County	Brad Little Republican		Stephen Heidt Democratic		Ammon Bundy Independent		Paul Sand Libertarian		Chantyrose Davison Constitution		Lisa Marie Independent (write-in)		Other write-in (Note: These totals are taken from individual county stats with a "write-in" section on the LiveVoterTurnout.com. In the counties where Lisa Marie received any votes, paired with a greater number of unspecified write-ins, the number in this column reflects the total write-ins minus Lisa Marie's votes.)		Margin		Total
County	Votes	%	Votes	%	Votes	%	Votes	%	Votes	%	Votes	%	Votes	%	Votes	%	Total
Ada	105,276	56.84%	53,693	28.99%	22,867	12.35%	2,190	1.18%	1,200	0.65%	3	0.00%	0	0.00%	51,580	27.85%	185,229
Adams	1,287	63.71%	239	11.83%	446	22.08%	23	1.14%	25	1.24%	0	0.00%	0	0.00%	841 (Note: In counties where Bundy placed second, ahead of Heidt, the margin given is Little's vote and percentage minus Bundy's vote and percentage.)	41.63%	2,020
Bannock	14,945	58.51%	7,006	27.43%	2,907	11.38%	379	1.48%	263	1.03%	1	0.00%	41	0.16%	7,939	31.08%	25,542
Bear Lake	1,412	62.31%	140	6.18%	678	29.92%	17	0.75%	19	0.84%	0	0.00%	0	0.00%	734	32.39%	2,266
Benewah	2,097	60.71%	397	11.49%	871	25.22%	44	1.27%	45	1.30%	0	0.00%	0	0.00%	1,226	35.50%	3,454
Bingham	8,750	70.66%	1,277	10.31%	2,022	16.33%	144	1.16%	170	1.37%	0	0.00%	0	0.00%	6,728	54.42%	12,363
Blaine	4,022	41.32%	5,149	52.90%	424	4.36%	80	0.82%	45	0.46%	0	0.00%	14	0.14%	-1,127	-11.58%	9,734
Boise	1,932	56.10%	453	13.15%	970	28.16%	37	1.07%	46	1.34%	6	0.17%	0	0.00%	962	27.93%	3,444
Bonner	12,136	58.36%	3,121	15.01%	5,110	24.57%	198	0.95%	229	1.10%	0	0.00%	0	0.00%	7,026	33.79%	20,794
Bonneville	24,525	69.11%	5,310	14.96%	4,803	13.53%	451	1.27%	395	1.11%	3	0.01%	0	0.00%	19,215	54.15%	35,487
Boundary	3,084	58.87%	437	8.34%	1,602	30.58%	49	0.94%	56	1.07%	11	0.21%	0	0.00%	1,482	28.29%	5,239
Butte	635	62.93%	74	7.33%	266	26.36%	19	1.88%	15	1.49%	0	0.00%	0	0.00%	369	36.57%	1,009
Camas	337	65.18%	61	11.80%	104	20.12%	8	1.55%	7	1.35%	0	0.00%	0	0.00%	234	45.26%	517
Canyon	34,316	58.83%	9,236	15.83%	13,554	23.24%	682	1.17%	538	0.92%	3	0.01%	0	0.00%	20,762	35.59%	58,329
Caribou	1,495	70.52%	142	6.70%	436	20.57%	22	1.04%	25	1.18%	0	0.00%	0	0.00%	1,059	49.95%	2,120
Cassia	4,074	70.06%	371	6.78%	1,226	21.08%	68	1.17%	63	1.08%	0	0.00%	13	0.22%	2,848	48.98%	5,815
Clark	145	69.71%	12	5.77%	45	21.63%	2	0.96%	4	1.92%	0	0.00%	0	0.00%	100	48.08%	208
Clearwater	2,220	71.13%	368	11.79%	467	14.96%	35	1.12%	24	0.77%	7	0.22%	0	0.00%	1,753	56.17%	3,121
Custer	1,228	60.31%	232	11.39%	538	26.42%	15	0.74%	22	1.08%	1	0.00%	0	0.00%	690	33.89%	2,036
Elmore	4,260	64.25%	1,023	15.43%	1,146	17.29%	107	1.61%	94	1.42%	0	0.00%	0	0.00%	3,114	46.97%	6,630
Franklin	2,744	63.27%	213	4.91%	1,294	29.84%	33	0.76%	53	1.22%	0	0.00%	0	0.00%	1,450	33.43%	4,337
Fremont	3,073	72.10%	347	8.14%	737	17.29%	41	0.96%	64	1.50%	0	0.00%	0	0.00%	2,336	54.81%	4,262
Gem	4,582	60.04%	599	7.85%	2,310	30.27%	72	0.94%	68	0.89%	0	0.00%	0	0.00%	2,272	29.77%	7,631
Gooding	2,458	60.68%	430	10.61%	1,075	26.54%	40	0.99%	47	1.16%	1	0.02%	0	0.00%	1,383	34.14%	4,051
Idaho	4,840	64.79%	638	8.54%	1,816	24.31%	98	1.31%	78	1.04%	0	0.00%	0	0.00%	3,024	40.48%	7,470
Jefferson	6,591	72.52%	580	6.38%	1,668	18.35%	95	1.05%	154	1.69%	1	0.01%	0	0.00%	4,923	54.16%	9,089
Jerome	3,161	64.91%	540	11.09%	1,051	21.58%	59	1.21%	47	0.97%	0	0.00%	12	0.25%	2,110	43.33%	4,870
Kootenai	38,296	61.29%	9,299	14.88%	13,727	21.97%	517	0.83%	451	0.72%	6	0.01%	183	0.29%	24,569	39.32%	62,479
Latah	8,256	54.88%	5,043	33.52%	1,403	9.33%	184	1.22%	87	0.58%	0	0.00%	70	0.47%	3,213	21.36%	15,043
Lemhi	2,465	67.35%	421	11.50%	713	19.48%	34	0.93%	26	0.71%	1	0.03%	0	0.00%	1,752	47.87%	3,660
Lewis	1,013	74.43%	123	9.04%	210	15.43%	6	0.44%	9	0.66%	0	0.00%	0	0.00%	803	59.00%	1,361
Lincoln	841	63.66%	152	11.51%	292	22.10%	18	1.36%	18	1.36%	0	0.00%	0	0.00%	549	41.56%	1,321
Madison	6,037	72.42%	694	8.33%	1,388	16.65%	85	1.02%	132	1.58%	0	0.00%	0	0.00%	4,649	55.77%	8,336
Minidoka	3,222	68.25%	399	8.45%	980	20.76%	61	1.29%	59	1.25%	0	0.00%	0	0.00%	2,242	47.49%	4,721
Nez Perce	9,252	68.63%	2,659	19.72%	1,328	9.85%	154	1.14%	88	0.65%	0	0.00%	0	0.00%	6,593	48.91%	13,481
Oneida	1,031	65.21%	70	4.29%	499	30.59%	9	0.55%	18	1.10%	0	0.00%	4	0.25%	532	32.62%	1,631
Owyhee	1,881	57.17%	300	9.12%	1,015	30.85%	44	1.34%	49	1.49%	1	0.03%	0	0.00%	866	26.32%	3,290
Payette	4,874	64.06%	723	9.50%	1,846	24.26%	84	1.10%	82	1.08%	0	0.00%	0	0.00%	3,028	39.79%	7,609
Power	1,411	71.41%	297	15.03%	210	10.63%	24	1.21%	30	1.52%	0	0.00%	4	0.20%	1,114	56.38%	1,976
Shoshone	2,614	63.32%	767	18.58%	669	16.21%	42	1.02%	36	0.87%	0	0.00%	0	0.00%	1,847	44.74%	4,128
Teton	2,169	46.23%	1,989	42.39%	453	9.65%	62	1.32%	19	0.40%	0	0.00%	0	0.00%	180	3.84%	4,692
Twin Falls	13,884	60.29%	3,428	14.89%	5,111	22.19%	291	1.26%	279	1.21%	0	0.00%	36	0.16%	8,773	38.10%	23,029
Valley	3,211	61.37%	1,344	25.69%	578	11.05%	62	1.19%	36	0.69%	1	0.02%	0	0.00%	1,867	35.68%	5,232
Washington	2,516	64.12%	364	9.28%	980	24.97%	29	0.74%	35	0.89%	0	0.00%	0	0.00%	1,536	39.14%	3,924

===== Counties that flipped from Democratic to Republican =====
- Latah (largest municipality: Moscow)
- Ada (largest municipality: Boise)
- Teton (largest municipality: Victor)

==== By congressional district ====
Little won both congressional districts.

District	Little	Heidt	Bundy	Representative
1st	61%	17%	20%	Russ Fulcher
2nd	60%	24%	14%	Mike Simpson

== See also ==
- 2022 Idaho lieutenant gubernatorial election
- List of governors of Idaho
- Elections in Idaho
- 2022 Idaho elections
