= Kelley Packer =

American politician

Member of the Idaho House of Representatives from District 28 Seat B
- In office December 1, 2012 – December 1, 2018
- Preceded by: Jim Marriott
- Succeeded by: Kevin Andrus

Personal details
- Party: Republican
- Education: American InterContinental University
- Occupation: Politician
- Website: kelleypacker.us

Kelley Packer was a Republican Idaho State Representative from 2012 to 2018 representing District 28 in the B seat and was a Republican candidate for lieutenant governor in the 2018 primary election. In 2019, Packer was named head of the Bureau of Occupational Licenses (IBOL) by Governor Brad Little, a position she held until April 2020.

== Education ==
Packer graduated from Marsh Valley High School and earned her Associate of Arts (AA) degree from American InterContinental University. She works in Public Relations.

== Elections ==
District 28 House Seat B - Power County and part of Bannock County
Year	Candidate	Votes	Pct	Candidate	Votes	Pct	Candidate	Votes	Pct
2012 Primary	Kelley Packer	1,669	50.3%	Kevin England	1,346	40.6%	John Hart	301	9.1%
2012 General	Kelley Packer	12,299	63.0%	Kamren Koompin	7,212	37.0%			
2014 Primary	Kelley Packer (incumbent)	3,112	65.1%	Lance Earl	1,666	34.9%			
2014 General	Kelley Packer (incumbent)	10,942	100.0%						
2016 Primary	Kelley Packer (incumbent)	2,543	56.8%	Jason West	1,935	43.2%			
2016 General	Kelley Packer (incumbent)	12,920	67.0%	Louis Archuleta	6,356	33.0%			

Packer supported Mitt Romney in the Republican Party presidential primaries, 2012.

== 2018 Lieutenant Governor's Race ==
On April 5, 2017, Packer filed to run for Lieutenant Governor of Idaho in the Idaho Republican Party primary. On April 10, 2017, she announced her run at a campaign kickoff outside Holt Arena. She planned to make over 200 campaign stops in the campaign.

Packer drew 13.7% of the vote in the 2018 primary election, placing her fifth among Republicans seeking the office.

Idaho Lieutenant Governor Republican primary, 2018
Party	Candidate	Votes	%
Republican	Janice McGeachin	51,079	28.9
Republican	Steve Yates	48,221	27.3
Republican	Marv Hagedorn	26,640	15.1
Republican	Bob Nonini	26,517	15.0
Republican	Kelley Packer	24,294	13.7
