= Bob Nonini =

American politician

Member of the Idaho Senate from District 3
- In office December 1, 2012 – December 1, 2018
- Preceded by: Jim Hammond
- Succeeded by: Don Cheatham

Member of the Idaho House of Representatives from District 5 Seat A
- In office December 1, 2004 – December 1, 2012
- Preceded by: Hilde Kellogg
- Succeeded by: Ron Mendive

Personal details
- Born: August 7, 1954 (age 72) Wallace, Idaho
- Party: Republican
- Education: North Idaho College
- Profession: Insurance salesman

Robert Paul Nonini (born August 7, 1954) is an American politician who was a Republican member of the Idaho Senate serving District 3 from 2012 to 2018. He previously served in the Idaho State Representative from 2004 to 2012 representing District 5 in the A seat.

== Education ==
Nonini graduated from Wallace High School and attended North Idaho College.

== 2018 Lieutenant Governor's race ==
Nonini announced October 9, 2017 on social media that he will run for Lt. Governor of Idaho in 2018. He filed with the Secretary of State's office October 10, 2017.

On March 3, 2018, Nonini reportedly nodded when asked at a candidates forum if the punishment for getting an abortion should include the death penalty. However, he has denied ever having nodded in agreement. "Prosecutions have always been focused on the abortionist," he said later, but such a law and "...the threat of prosecution, would dramatically reduce abortion. That is my goal."

Nonni drew 15% of the primary election vote, placing fourth among Republicans seeking the office.

== Elections ==
District 5 House Seat A - Part of Kootenai County
| Year | Candidate | Votes | Pct | Candidate | Votes | Pct | Candidate | Votes | Pct |
|---|---|---|---|---|---|---|---|---|---|
| 2004 Primary | Bob Nonini | 1,641 | 51.9% | Ron Vieselmeyer | 1,522 | 48.1% | | | |
| 2004 General | Bob Nonini | 10,804 | 64.3% | David Larsen | 5,217 | 31.0% | Rose Johnson | 784 | 4.7% |
| 2006 Primary | Bob Nonini (incumbent) | 2,851 | 100% | | | | | | |
| 2006 General | Bob Nonini (incumbent) | 7,562 | 63.7% | David Larsen | 4,278 | 36.1% | Rose Johnson (W/I) | 23 | 0.2% |
| 2008 Primary | Bob Nonini (incumbent) | 2,426 | 100% | | | | | | |
| 2008 General | Bob Nonini (incumbent) | 15,850 | 96.9% | Karin Ducote (W/I) | 515 | 3.1% | | | |
| 2010 Primary | Bob Nonini (incumbent) | 3,413 | 100% | | | | | | |
| 2010 General | Bob Nonini (incumbent) | 9,973 | 73.1% | David Larsen | 3,674 | 26.9% | | | |

District 3 Senate - Part of Kootenai County
| Year | Candidate | Votes | Pct | Candidate | Votes | Pct |
|---|---|---|---|---|---|---|
| 2012 Primary | Bob Nonini | 3,161 | 100% | | | |
| 2012 General | Bob Nonini | 12,132 | 68.3% | Kristy Reed Johnson | 5,641 | 31.7% |
| 2014 Primary | Bob Nonini (incumbent) | 2,461 | 64.7% | Patrick Whalen | 1,345 | 35.3% |
| 2014 General | Bob Nonini (incumbent) | 8,643 | 100% | | | |
| 2016 Primary | Bob Nonini (incumbent) | 3,254 | 100% | | | |
| 2016 General | Bob Nonini (incumbent) | 16,990 | 100% | | | |

Idaho Lieutenant Governor Republican primary, 2018
| Party | Candidate | Votes | % |
|---|---|---|---|
| Republican | Janice McGeachin | 51,079 | 28.9 |
| Republican | Steve Yates | 48,221 | 27.3 |
| Republican | Marv Hagedorn | 26,640 | 15.1 |
| Republican | Bob Nonini | 26,517 | 15.0 |
| Republican | Kelley Packer | 24,294 | 13.7 |
