= Barry Peterson (Republican) =

American politician

Chair of the Idaho Republican Party
- In office June 2012 – June 2014
- Preceded by: Norm Semanko
- Succeeded by: Stephen J. Yates

Personal details
- Party: Republican

Barry Peterson is a former Idaho Republican Party chairman and hardware store owner in Mountain Home.

== Early life ==
Peterson was born and raised in Idaho.

== Political career ==
Peterson was a Precinct committee officer for Elmore County Republican Party.

Peterson was chair of the Idaho Republican Party from 2012- 2014.

In 2016 Peterson served has Mike Crapo Elmore County Chair.

Peterson supported Ted Cruz in the Republican Party presidential primaries, 2016.

Peterson was one of three names submitted to Elmore County Commissioners by the Elmore County Republican Central Committee to replace retiring Coroner Jerry Rost June 2019. Gayle ReMine was chosen by the Commissioners but she declined so Peterson was sworn in. Peterson after being Elmore County Coroner for less than a week resigned since he wasn't available to sign off on two deaths in the area in that week.

== Idaho Republican Party Chair ==
Peterson was elected Idaho Republican Party chair at the State Convention in 2012, defeating Gayann DeMordaunt. Pete Nielsen of Mountain Home and Stephen Hartgen of Twin Falls gave speeches of support for Peterson has chair.

He had Joshua Whitworth (2012-2013) and then Trevor Thorpe (2013-2014) and finally Judy Gowen (2014) has executive director of the party, when he served.

Peterson lost reelection has a Precinct committee officer in Elmore County (May 2014) but he was still able to run for reelection has chair at the Summer Meeting later that year. He also lost control of Elmore County Republican with his people losing leadership elections. He blamed Butch Otter and others for his losses and expected the Governor to support someone else has chair.

At the convention the delegates didn't vote on new leadership leaving Peterson to believe that he was still chair. Otter and his supporters disagreed. Peterson then sued to finally figure out who was in control of the party. On July 29, 2014, 5th District Judge Randy Stoker ruled that Peterson was no longer chair of the party.

Party political offices
Preceded by Norm Semanko	Chair of the Idaho Republican Party; 2012–2014	Succeeded by Stephen Yates (Idaho)
