= Shirley McKague =

American politician (1935–2020)

Member of the Idaho Senate from District 20
- In office January 2007 – December 1, 2012
- Preceded by: Gerry Sweet
- Succeeded by: Chuck Winder

Member of the Idaho House of Representatives from District 20 Position B
- In office December 1, 2002 – January 2007
- Preceded by: Sher Sellman
- Succeeded by: Marv Hagedorn

Member of the Idaho House of Representatives from District 14 Position B
- In office December 1, 1996 – December 1, 2002
- Preceded by: Milt Erhart
- Succeeded by: Henry Kulczyk

Personal details
- Born: December 4, 1935 Nampa, Idaho
- Died: May 21, 2020 (aged 84)
- Party: Republican
- Spouse: Paul McKague
- Profession: Legal secretary and Service Station Owner

Shirley J. McKague (née Woolard, December 4, 1935 – May 21, 2020) was an American politician from Idaho. She was an Idaho State Senator, representing the 20th District as a Republican from 2007 to 2012. She previously served as an Idaho State Representative for Districts 14B and 20B from 1997 until her appointment to fill the vacancy caused by the resignation of Senator Gerry Sweet.

== Early life and career ==
McKague was born in Nampa, Idaho in 1935 and raised in Meridian. She graduated Nampa High School in 1953. McKague and her husband Paul have six children.

Before entering politics, McKague was a:

- Secretary, Idaho State House, 1986–1996
- Columnist, Valley Times, 1980–1982
- Business Partner/Book Keeper, Family Service Station, 1969–1996
- Legal Secretary, Carey Nixon, Esquire, 1963–1970
- Stenographer, Idaho Public Utilities Commission, 1960–1963

== Political career ==
McKague previously worked as:

- Idaho State Representative, 1997–2007
- House Committee Secretary, 1986–1997
- Precinct Worker and Committeeman, 1986

== Committees ==
McKague was a member of:

- Senate Judiciary and Rules Committee
- Senate Local Government and Taxation Committee

== Elections ==
=== Idaho Senate District 20 ===
In February 2012, McKague announced her retirement and endorsed fellow Republican Senator Chuck Winder; redistricting had placed them both in the newly redrawn Senate District 20. McKague worked until the end of the legislative session in December 2012.

==== 2010 ====
McKague defeated Mike Vuittonet in the Republican primary with 60.1% of the vote. McKague was unopposed in the general election.

==== 2008 ====
McKague defeated Mark Snodgrass in the Republican primary with 53.4% of the vote. McKague defeated Democratic nominee Laurynda "Ryndy" Williams with 68.7% of the vote in the general election.

McKague was appointed to the vacant Senate seat for District 20 caused by the resignation of Senator Gerry Sweet, took office early in 2007.

=== Idaho House of Representatives District 20 Seat B ===
==== 2006 ====
McKague was unopposed in the Republican primary. McKague defeated Democratic nominee Chuck Oxley and Libertarian nominee Kevin Charles Jaeger with 65.59% of the vote in the general election.

==== 2004 ====
McKague was unopposed in the Republican primary. McKague defeated Democratic nominee Kenton S. Travis with 65.6% of the vote in the general election.

==== 2002 ====
McKague was unopposed in the Republican primary. McKague defeated Democratic nominee Richard Harlan and Libertarian nominee David Lieberman.

=== Idaho House of Representatives District 14 Seat B ===
==== 2000 ====
McKague defeated Steve Coyle, and Trevor A. Chadwick in the Republican primary with 62.8% of the vote. McKague defeated Democratic nominee Jim Corey with 61.1% of the vote.

==== 1998 ====
McKague defeated Milt Erhart again in the Republican primary with 61.1% of the vote. McKague defeated Gilda Bothwell this time as the Natural Law nominee and Platt Thompson Reform party nominee with 80.6% of the vote.

==== 1996 ====
McKague defeated WesLee Hoalst, and Milt Erhart in the Republican primary with 45% of the vote. McKague defeated Democratic nominee Glida Bothwell with 67.3% of the vote in the general election.
