= Marv Hagedorn =

American politician from Idaho

Member of the Idaho Senate from District 14
- In office December 1, 2012 – July 30, 2018
- Preceded by: Chuck Winder
- Succeeded by: C. Scott Grow

Member of the Idaho House of Representatives from District 20 Position B
- In office January 12, 2007 – November 30, 2012
- Preceded by: Shirley McKague
- Succeeded by: James Holtzclaw

Personal details
- Born: March 2, 1956 (age 70) Omak, Washington
- Party: Republican
- Education: Pensacola Junior College; University of Maryland
- Website: marvhagedorn.com

Military service
- Branch/service: United States Navy
- Years of service: 1973–1994

Marv Hagedorn (born March 2, 1956, in Omak, Washington) has been Idaho's Veterans Division administrator since July 30, 2018.

Hagedorn was a Republican Idaho Senator representing District 14 from 2012 to 2018. He previously was an Idaho State Representative (2007–2012) by appointment of Governor Butch Otter in January 2007 representing District 20 in the B seat. Hagedorn ran for Idaho lieutenant governor in 2018 and placed third in the Republican primary.

== Education ==
Hagedorn attended Pensacola Junior College and the University of Maryland.

== Elections ==
District 20 House Seat A - Part of Ada County
Year	Candidate	Votes	Pct	Candidate	Votes	Pct
2006 Primary	Marv Hagedorn	1,402	40.8%	Mark Snodgrass (incumbent)	2,038	59.2%

District 20 House Seat B - Part of Ada County
Year	Candidate	Votes	Pct
2008 Primary	Marv Hagedorn (incumbent)	2,915	100%
2008 General	Marv Hagedorn (incumbent)	17,035	100%
2010 Primary	Marv Hagedorn (incumbent)	3,907	100%
2010 General	Marv Hagedorn (incumbent)	11,851	100%

District 14 Senate - Part of Ada County
Year	Candidate	Votes	Pct	Candidate	Votes	Pct	Candidate	Votes	Pct
2012 Primary	Marv Hagedorn	1,988	55.5%	Stan Bastian	1,059	29.6%	Gary Bauer	536	15.0%
2012 General	Marv Hagedorn	14,284	66.4%	Al Shoushtarian	7,213	33.6%			
2014 Primary	Marv Hagedorn (incumbent)	3,746	100%						
2014 General	Marv Hagedorn (incumbent)	11,558	69.7%	Robert Spencer	5,033	30.3%			
2016 Primary	Marv Hagedorn (incumbent)	3,585	100.0%						
2016 General	Marv Hagedorn (incumbent)	19,011	70.6%	Miranda Gold	7,903	29.4%			

== 2018 Lieutenant Governor's race ==
On December 7, 2016, Hagedorn announced via Twitter that he planned to run for Lieutenant Governor of Idaho, becoming the first to announce.

Hagedorn drew 15.1% of the vote in the May 2018 primary election, placing him third among Republicans running for the office.

Idaho Lieutenant Governor Republican primary, 2018
Party	Candidate	Votes	%
Republican	Janice McGeachin	51,079	28.9
Republican	Steve Yates	48,221	27.3
Republican	Marv Hagedorn	26,640	15.1
Republican	Bob Nonini	26,517	15.0
Republican	Kelley Packer	24,294	13.7

== Sexual assault comments ==
On September 28, 2018, Hagedorn joked about sexual assault reporting on Twitter, stating "Two ladies have come forward describing how Kavanaugh actually intentionally flashed them with his genitalia uncovered while trying to urinate on them! Regardless that he was a newborn these 2 nurses have been scared & need an FBI investigation!" The tweet was met with backlash and criticism. In response, Hagedorn tweeted "What was meant as a bad joke was insensitive to many. I apologize. It was meant to make us ask ourselves, 'When is it too late to speak up?' Sexual trauma is serious and real, what we are witnessing is sending the message that it's OK not to speak up! It's not!" Hagedorn had to complete mandatory HR training following the incident. The Idaho Falls Post Register editorial board stated, "Hagedorn's poor apology shows he didn't grasp what was wrong with his tasteless joke in the first place."
