= Norm Semanko =

American politician

Chair of the Idaho Republican Party
- In office June 2008 – June 2012
- Preceded by: J. Kirk Sullivan
- Succeeded by: Barry Peterson

Personal details
- Party: Republican

Norm Semanko is a former Idaho Republican Party chairman and currently practices law at Parsons Behle and Latimer.

== Career ==
After earning a bachelor's degree from the University of Idaho and law degree from Georgetown University. Semanko began working as a lawyer in the state of Idaho in 1993. Semanko specializes in environmental law, with a particular emphasis on water resources issues.

Semanko has served on a number of advisory boards, including time as president of the Coalition for Idaho Water, as president of the Food Producers of Idaho, and was on Eagle City Council where he served as president.

Semanko was the executive director and general counsel for the Idaho Water Users Association (IWUA) from 2000 to 2017.

He currently practices law at Parsons Behle and Latimer where he is the Managing Shareholder of the Boise Office and leads the firm's Water Law Practice Group in the Pacific Northwest. He was previously with Moffatt Thomas, where he became a partner in 2017 and headed up the Water, Environmental, and Natural Resources Law Practice Groups side of the firm.

== Political career ==
Semanko was the head of the College Republicans at the University of Idaho.

Semanko spent four years working for Sen. Larry Craig in Washington, D.C., in both the House and Senate.

Semanko was a delegate at the 2008 Republican National Convention.

Semanko was on the RNC Ethics Committee, and on the RNC Budget Committee, representing the Western Region.

Semanko was the general counsel to the Republican National Committee from 2010 to 2011.

Semanko was Ted Cruz state director for Idaho (in which Cruz won Idaho's primary), was a Cruz delegate at the 2016 Republican National Convention and serve on the Rules committee.

Semanko served has Raúl Labrador Grassroots and Coalition Chair in 2016. which Labrador won both the primary and the general election handily.

Since mid 2016 Semanko founded Red States Solutions which provides political consulting to Republicans.

== Idaho Republican Party Chair ==
First elected to the position in 2008, he was unanimously re-elected in 2010, and choose not to run for reelection in 2012.

He dealt with redistricting and settled litigation to prevent Republican primaries from being open to partisan non-Republicans.

== Elections ==
In 2006, Semanko ran as a Republican to represent Idaho's 1st congressional district. Semanko ran with a focus on limited government, lower taxes, and strong national defense. Semanko lost the primary election, receiving 10.8 percent of the votes.

In 2010, Semanko ran against incumbent Mayor of Eagle Jim Reynolds taking only 22.06% of the vote.

Party political offices
Preceded by J. Kirk Sullivan	Chair of the Idaho Republican Party; 2012–2014	Succeeded by Barry Peterson (Idaho)
