= Idaho's 27th legislative district =

American legislative district

Idaho's 27th legislative district is one of 35 districts of the Idaho Legislature. It is currently represented by Senator Kelly Anthon, Republican of Declo, Representative Douglas Pickett, Republican of Oakley, and Representative Clay Handy, Republican of Burley.

== District overview ==
=== Party affiliation ===
Party Affiliation as of January 2, 2018
Party	Registered	%
Republican	11,376	67.59%
Unaffiliated	4,404	26.16%
Democratic	942	5.60%
Libertarian	61	0.36%
Constitution	49	0.29%
Total	16,832	100%

=== Cities ===
City	County	Population
Albion	Cassia	267
Burley	Cassia	10,345
Declo	Cassia	343
Malta	Cassia	193
Oakley	Cassia	763
Acequia	Minidoka	124
Heyburn	Minidoka	3,089
Minidoka	Minidoka	112
Paul	Minidoka	1,169
Rupert	Minidoka	5,554

=== School districts ===
- Cassia County Joint School District #151
- Minidoka County School District #331

== District profile ==
=== 1992–2002 ===
From 1992 to 2002, District 27 consisted of all of Madison County and a portion of Fremont County.

Legislature	Session	Senate	House Seat A	House Seat B
51st (1992 - 1994)	1st	Mark Ricks (R)	Michael Johnson (R)	Golden Linford (R)
51st (1992 - 1994)	2nd	Mark Ricks (R)	Michael Johnson (R)	Golden Linford (R)
52nd (1994 - 1996)	1st	Robert Lee (R)	Diana Richman (R)	Golden Linford (R)
52nd (1994 - 1996)	2nd	Robert Lee (R)	Diana Richman (R)	Golden Linford (R)
53rd (1996 - 1998)	1st	Robert Lee (R)	Diana Richman (R)	Golden Linford (R)
53rd (1996 - 1998)	2nd	Robert Lee (R)	Diana Richman (R)	Golden Linford (R)
54th (1998 - 2000)	1st	Robert Lee (R)	Todd Hammond (R)	Golden Linford (R)
54th (1998 - 2000)	2nd	Robert Lee (R)	Todd Hammond (R)	Golden Linford (R)
55th (2000 - 2002)	1st	Robert Lee (R)	Todd Hammond (R)	Dell Raybould (R)
55th (2000 - 2002)	2nd	Brent Hill (R)	Todd Hammond (R)	Dell Raybould (R)

=== 2002–2012 ===
From 2002 to 2012, District 27 consisted of all of Cassia, Power, and Oneida counties, and a portion of Bingham County.

Legislature	Session	Senate	House Seat A	House Seat B
57th (2002 - 2004)	1st	Denton Darrington (R)	Scott Bedke (R)	Bruce Newcomb (R)
57th (2002 - 2004)	2nd	Denton Darrington (R)	Scott Bedke (R)	Bruce Newcomb (R)
58th (2004 - 2006)	1st	Denton Darrington (R)	Scott Bedke (R)	Bruce Newcomb (R)
58th (2004 - 2006)	2nd	Denton Darrington (R)	Scott Bedke (R)	Bruce Newcomb (R)
59th (2006 - 2008)	1st	Denton Darrington (R)	Scott Bedke (R)	Fred Wood (R)
59th (2006 - 2008)	2nd	Denton Darrington (R)	Scott Bedke (R)	Fred Wood (R)
60th (2008 - 2010)	1st	Denton Darrington (R)	Scott Bedke (R)	Fred Wood (R)
60th (2008 - 2010)	2nd	Denton Darrington (R)	Scott Bedke (R)	Fred Wood (R)
61st (2010 - 2012)	1st	Denton Darrington (R)	Scott Bedke (R)	Fred Wood (R)
61st (2010 - 2012)	2nd	Denton Darrington (R)	Scott Bedke (R)	Fred Wood (R)

=== 2012–2022 ===
District 27 consisted of all of Cassia and Minidoka counties.

Legislature	Session	Senate	House Seat A	House Seat B
62nd (2012 - 2014)	1st	Dean Cameron (R)	Scott Bedke (R)	Fred Wood (R)
62nd (2012 - 2014)	2nd	Dean Cameron (R)	Scott Bedke (R)	Fred Wood (R)
63rd (2014 - 2016)	1st	Dean Cameron (R)	Scott Bedke (R)	Fred Wood (R)
63rd (2014 - 2016)	2nd	Kelly Anthon (R)	Scott Bedke (R)	Fred Wood (R)
64th (2016 - 2018)	1st	Kelly Anthon (R)	Scott Bedke (R)	Fred Wood (R)
64th (2016 - 2018)	2nd	Kelly Anthon (R)	Scott Bedke (R)	Fred Wood (R)
65th (2018 - 2020)	1st	Kelly Anthon (R)	Scott Bedke (R)	Fred Wood (R)
65th (2018 - 2020)	2nd	Kelly Anthon (R)	Scott Bedke (R)	Fred Wood (R)
66th (2020 - 2022)	1st	Kelly Anthon (R)	Scott Bedke (R)	Fred Wood (R)
66th (2020 - 2022)	2nd	Kelly Anthon (R)	Scott Bedke (R)	Fred Wood (R)

=== 2022-present ===
District 27 currently consists of all of Cassia, Minidoka, and Oneida counties.

== See also ==
- List of Idaho senators
- List of Idaho representatives
