= Mount Harrison (Idaho) =

Mountain in the state of Idaho

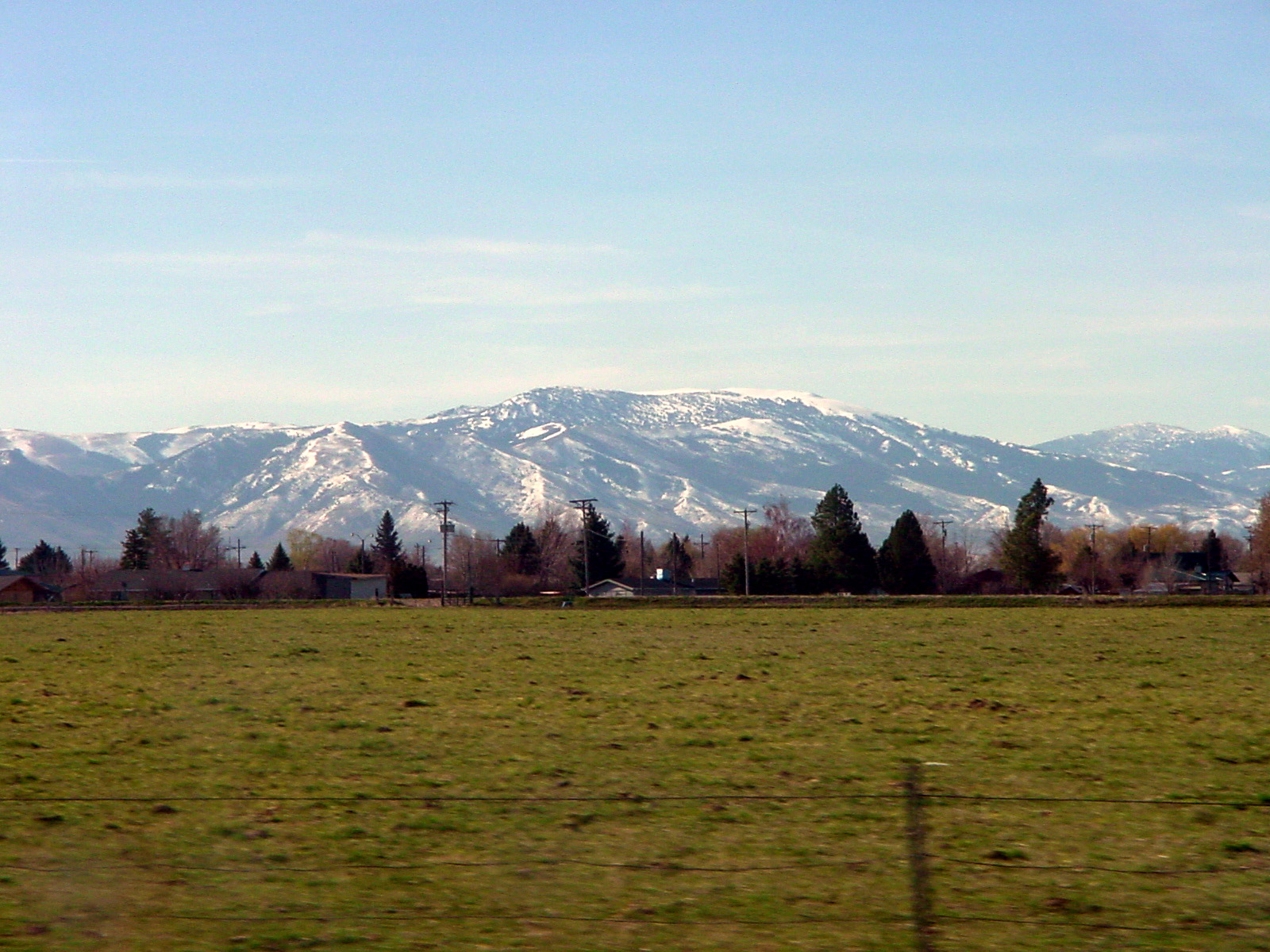
- Mount Harrison from Heyburn

Highest point
- Elevation: 9,265 ft (2,824 m)
- Prominence: 2,298 ft (700 m)
- Coordinates: 42°18′53″N 113°39′32″W

Geography
- Location within Idaho
- Location: Cassia County, Idaho, U.S.
- Parent range: Albion Mountains
- Topo map: USGS Mount Harrison

Climbing
- Easiest route: Paved road

Mount Harrison, at 9,265 feet (2,824 m) is a peak in the northern Albion Mountains of Cassia County in southern Idaho. Mount Harrison is located in north of Cache Peak, south of Burley, northeast of Oakley, and west of Malta in the Albion Division of the Minidoka Ranger District of Sawtooth National Forest. Mount Harrison is in the watershed of tributaries of the Snake River, which itself is a tributary of the Columbia River. The peak can be reached via a paved road that runs all the way to its summit. Lake Cleveland is located in the basin north of the peak, and a small unnamed lake is located in the basin southeast of the peak.

== Flora ==
Christ's Indian Paintbrush is a plant species that is endemic to Mount Harrison, being found nowhere else in the world than on this mountain at an elevation of about 9,100 feet (2,800 m). Mount Harrison also supports one of the three populations of Cymopterus davisii, a plant that is endemic to the Albion Mountains.

== Plane crash ==
On 9 February 1945 a B-24 Liberator Army Bomber crashed on Mount Harrison during a training mission in dense fog. All nine crew members on the plane died in the crash, and their bodies were recovered over the following days using sleds, snow tractors, and horses. The plane's remains have never been removed. A memorial service was held on 29 July 2004 to dedicate a plaque honoring those who died.

== See also ==
- List of mountains of Idaho
- List of mountain peaks of Idaho
- List of mountain ranges in Idaho
