= Smoky Mountain (Idaho) =

Mountain in Idaho, United States

- Location within Idaho

Highest point
- Elevation: 7,579 ft (2,310 m)
- Prominence: 1,380 ft (420 m)
- Parent peak: Graham Peak
- Coordinates: 42°03′34″N 113°40′49″W

Geography
- Location: Cassia County, Idaho, U.S.
- Parent range: Albion Mountains
- Topo map: USGS Almo

Climbing
- Easiest route: Simple scramble, class 2

Smoky Mountain, at 7,579 feet (2,310 m) above sea level is a peak in the Albion Mountains of Idaho. The peak is located in Cassia County about 0.35 mi (0.56 km) east of the border of City of Rocks National Reserve on land managed by the Bureau of Land Management. It is 4.7 mi (7.6 km) north of the Nevada border.

== See also ==
- List of mountains of Idaho
- List of mountain peaks of Idaho
- List of mountain ranges in Idaho
