= Pomerelle =

Ski area in Idaho, United States

- Location in the United States Location in Idaho
- Location: Sawtooth National Forest; Cassia County, Idaho, U.S.
- Nearest city: Albion 12 miles (19 km); Burley 28 miles (45 km)
- Coordinates: 42.318°N 113.608°W
- Vertical: 1,002 ft (305 m)
- Top elevation: 8,762 ft (2,671 m)
- Base elevation: 7,760 ft (2,365 m)
- Skiable area: 500 acres (2.0 km^{2})
- Trails: 24 – 20% easiest – 50% more difficult – 30% most difficult
- Longest run: 1.5 miles (2.4 km)
- Lift system: 2 triple chair 1 magic carpet
- Snowfall: 500 inches (41.7 ft; 12.7 m)
- Snowmaking: yes
- Night skiing: 5 nights per week (Tue–Sat)
- Website: www.pomerelle.com

Pomerelle Mountain is an alpine ski area in the western United States, in south central Idaho. It is located below Mount Harrison in the Albion Mountains in the Minidoka Ranger District of the Sawtooth National Forest, and south of Albion in Cassia County, thirty miles (50 km) northeast of the Utah-Nevada border with Idaho.

Pomerelle's summit elevation is 8,762 feet (2,671 m) above sea level with a vertical drop of 1,002 feet (305 m). There are two chairlifts (both triple) and a magic carpet for the beginners' area. The area's average annual snowfall is 500 inches (41.7 ft; 12.7 m).

One of the oldest ski areas in the western U.S., Pomerelle began its operations 86 years ago in 1940. During the ski season, it operates daily and five nights per week (Tuesday through Saturday).

Pomerelle features a spacious lodge at the bottom of the mountain offering foods and beverages. There is also a grill outside the lodge on the deck that offers hamburgers, hot dogs, cold drinks, and beer. In the basement of the lodge, there is a rental shop.

On New Year's Day in 1973, a chairlift mishap injured 21 skiers; there were no fatalities.
