= Thunder Mountain (Idaho) =

Mountain in the state of Idaho

- Location within Idaho

Highest point
- Elevation: 7,455 ft (2,272 m)
- Prominence: 675 ft (206 m)
- Parent peak: Cache Peak
- Coordinates: 42°10′18″N 113°36′49″W

Geography
- Location: Cassia County, Idaho, U.S.
- Parent range: Albion Mountains
- Topo map: USGS Elba

Climbing
- Easiest route: Simple scramble, class 2

Thunder Mountain, at 7,455 feet (2,272 m) above sea level is a peak in the Albion Mountains of Idaho. The peak is located in Sawtooth National Forest and Cassia County. It is located about 2.7 mi (4.3 km) southeast of Cache Peak.

== See also ==
- List of mountains of Idaho
- List of mountain peaks of Idaho
- List of mountain ranges in Idaho
