= Declo High School =

Coordinates: 42°30′59″N 113°37′19″W

- 505 East Main Street; Declo, Idaho 83323

Information
- Type: Public
- Principal: Roland Bott
- Staff: 16.62 (FTE)
- Grades: 9-12
- Enrollment: 311 (2023-2024)
- Student to teacher ratio: 18.71
- Colors: Orange & Black
- Mascot: Hornet
- IHSAA Classification: 2A
- Conference: Canyon
- Website: Declo High School

Declo High School is a public high school in Declo, Idaho. It is the second largest high school operated by the Cassia County Joint School District. Declo High School draws students from the cities of Declo and Albion as well as the unincorporated communities of Springdale, View and Unity to the west, Raft River to the east and Jackson to the north.

== History ==
Declo High School's first graduating class graduated in 1927.

The school's colors were green and white until about 1930, when they were changed to orange, black, and white.

Before the spring semester of the 1997–1998 school year, the junior and senior high schools (grades 7 through 12) were taught in a building built in the 1950s in crowded conditions. When the new building was completed, the high school moved there with grades 9 through 12 and the junior high remained in the older building, with grades 6 through 8.

In 2003, the original one room log school house was relocated in front of the high school and restored. Declo graduated its first class in 1927. Originally the schools colors were green and white, but were changed to its present orange and black in the 1930s. The mascot is a hornet. The school fight song melds the choruses from “Stars and Stripes Forever” and “Go, Vandals, Go”, the fight song of the University of Idaho.

== Athletics ==
Declo High School is classified as a 2A school by the Idaho High School Activities Association. It currently competes in the Canyon Conference within District IV against Wendell High Schools. Due to the conference only having two members. It competes in men's and women's basketball, volleyball, wrestling, football, softball, golf, cross country and track and field. Declo High School routinely wins district championships and earns berths to state championship competition in many sports. The cross country team's shirts in 2011-2012 said "Life is Short, Running Makes it Seem Longer."

=== State championships ===
- Football: 2012, 2013, 2017 (2A)
- Men's Basketball: 1998 (A-3), 2003 (3A)
- Women's Basketball: 1990 (2A)
- Wrestling: 1998 (A-3), 2011 (2A), 2012 (2A), 2013 (2A)
- Girls soccer
- Boys soccer

== Notable alumni ==
- Denton Darrington, Class of 1958
- J.R. Simplot, founder of the J. R. Simplot Company
- Kelly Anthon, Class of 1992
