= Mount Independence (Idaho) =

Mountain in the state of Idaho

- Location within Idaho

Highest point
- Elevation: 9,950 ft (3,030 m)
- Prominence: 350 ft (110 m)
- Parent peak: Cache Peak
- Coordinates: 42°11′51″N 113°40′30″W

Geography
- Location: Cassia County, Idaho, U.S.
- Parent range: Albion Mountains
- Topo map: USGS Cache Peak

Climbing
- Easiest route: Simple scramble, class 2

Mount Independence is the second highest peak in the Albion Mountains of Idaho. The peak is located in Sawtooth National Forest and Cassia County. It is located about 1 mi (1.6 km) northwest of Cache Peak. The Independence Lakes are located in the basin to the east of the peak. Mount Independence supports one of the three populations of Cymopterus davisii, a plant that is endemic to the Albion Mountains. The Mount Independence population is considered a single population with Cache Peak. Mount Independence is 9,950 feet (3,030 m) above sea level.

== See also ==
- List of mountain peaks of Idaho
- List of mountain peaks of the United States
- List of mountain peaks of North America
- List of mountains of Idaho
- List of mountain ranges in Idaho
