= Albion Mountains =

Mountain range in Idaho, USA

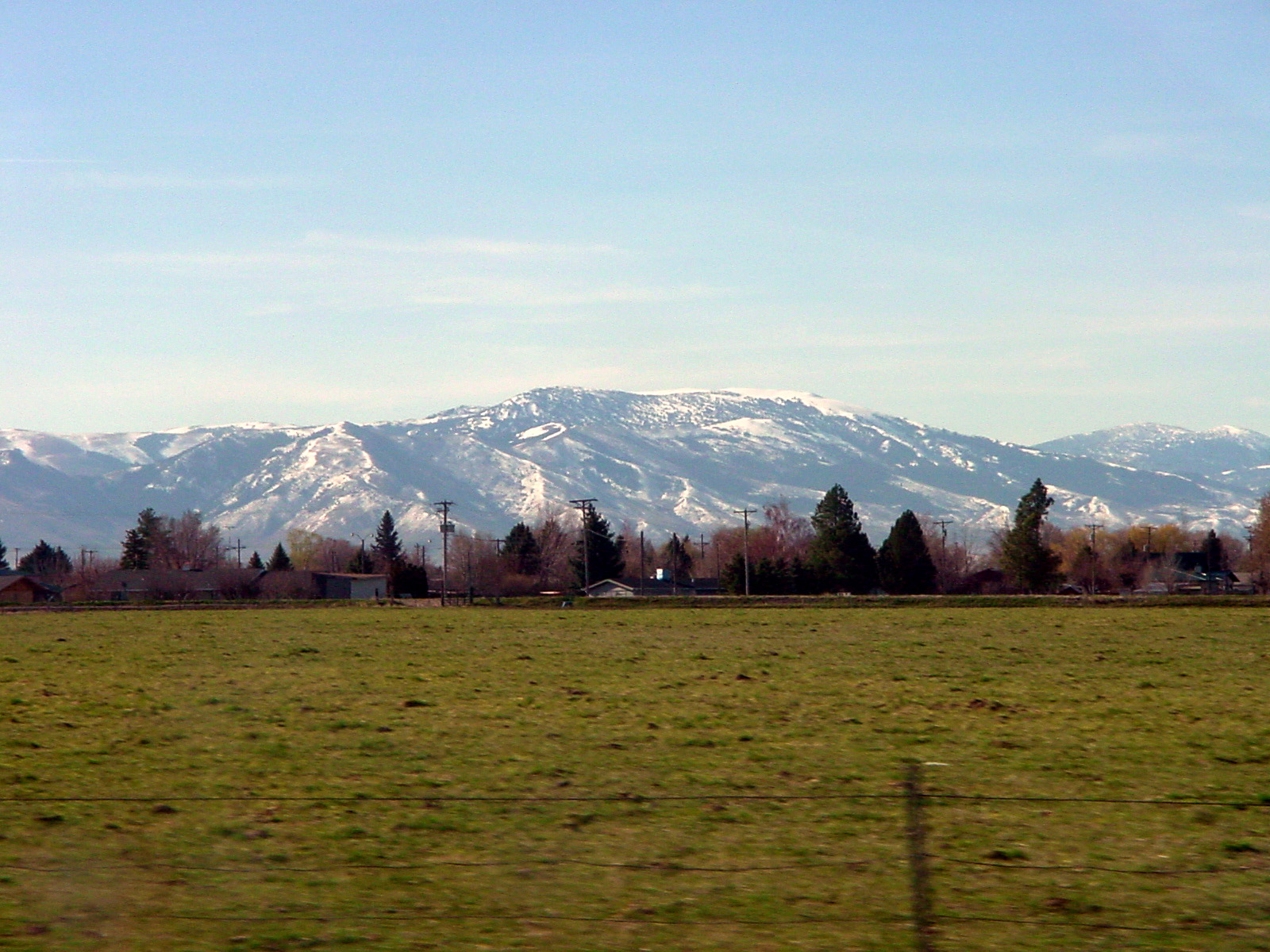
- Albion Mountains from Heyburn

Highest point
- Peak: Cache Peak
- Elevation: 10,339 ft (3,151 m)
- Coordinates: 42°11′08″N 113°39′40″W

Dimensions
- Length: 49 mi (79 km) N/S
- Width: 36 mi (58 km) E/W
- Area: 1,082 mi^{2} (2,800 km^{2})

Geography
- Country: United States
- State: Idaho

The Albion Mountains are a mountain range in the U.S. states of Idaho (~99%) and Utah (~1%), spanning Cassia County, Idaho and barely reaching into Box Elder County, Utah. The highest point in the range is Cache Peak at 10,339 feet (3,151 m), and the range is a part of the Basin and Range Province. Most of the mountains are part of the Albion Division of the Minidoka Ranger District of Sawtooth National Forest.

The Raft River Mountains are southeast of the range, while the Black Pine Mountains are to the east and the Snake River Plain to the north. The streams in the mountains are in the Snake River watershed, which is a tributary of the Columbia River. The towns of Almo, Elba, and Malta are east of the range, Albion, Burley, and Heyburn are to the north, and Oakley is to the west. There are six alpine lakes in the Albion Mountains. Lake Cleveland is north of Mount Harrison, a small unnamed lake is southeast of Mount Harrison, and the four Independence Lakes are north of Cache Peak.

Several roads and trails are located in the mountains, which provide for a variety of activities including hiking, off-road vehicle riding, fishing, and hunting. A paved road ascends to the summit of Mount Harrison. Most of the peaks can be accessed relatively easily via class one or two routes. City of Rocks National Reserve and Castle Rocks State Park are located in the southern portion of the range and is a popular destination for rock climbing. The Pomerelle ski area is located in the range and has two chairlifts.

Idaho's rarest plant, Christ's Indian Paintbrush is a plant endemic to the upper slopes of Mount Harrison, being found nowhere else in the world. Davis' springparsley is a plant that is also endemic to the Albion Mountains. The Cassia crossbill is a bird once considered a subspecies of the Red crossbill, but is now considered a separate species, with it being endemic to the Albion Mountains and the South Hills due to ecological speciation.

In February 1945 nine people died on Mount Harrison when a B-24 Liberator Army Bomber crashed during a training mission in dense fog.

== Peaks ==
The peaks of the Albion Mountains
Mountain Peak	Elevation	Prominence	Isolation	Location
Cache Peak	10,338 ft 3151 m	4,459 ft 1359 m	81.8 mi 131.6 km	42.185606°N 113.661156°W
Mount Independence	9,951 ft 3033 m	351 ft 107 m	1.07 mi 1.73 km	42.197413°N 113.675010°W
Mount Harrison	9,265 ft 2824 m	2,297 ft 700 m	7.75 mi 12.47 km	42.314634°N 113.658899°W
Graham Peak	8,868 ft 2703 m	669 ft 204 m	5.13 mi 8.26 km	42.123525°N 113.716677°W
Peak 8,858	8,858 ft 2700 m	318 ft 97 m	2.3 mi 3.7 km	42.1771°N 113.7101°W
Peak 8,770	8,770 ft 2673 m	469 ft 143 m	1.74 mi 2.8 km	42.1523°N 113.7069°W
Peak 8,752	8,760 ft 2670 m	581 ft 177 m	1.39 mi 2.24 km	42.3058°N 113.6151°W
Peak 8,740	8,737 ft 2663 m	518 ft 158 m	1.49 mi 2.4 km	42.2154°N 113.6917°W
Connor Ridge	8,327 ft 2538 m	466 ft 142 m	1.49 mi 2.4 km	42.3162°N 113.5891°W
Peak 7,715	7,713 ft 2351 m	896 ft 273 m	3.29 mi 5.3 km	42.0790°N 113.7397°W
Peak 7,689	7,687 ft 2343 m	709 ft 216 m	1.93 mi 3.1 km	42.1006°N 113.6943°W
Smoky Mountain	7,579 ft 2310 m	1,401 ft 427 m	2.98 mi 4.8 km	42.0590°N 113.6799°W
Thunder Mountain	7,454 ft 2272 m	676 ft 206 m	2.61 mi 4.2 km	42.1714°N 113.6136°W
Peak 7,410	7,411 ft 2259 m	351 ft 107 m	4.85 mi 7.8 km	42.3789°N 113.6661°W
Peak 7,362	7,359 ft 2243 m	302 ft 92 m	3.54 mi 5.7 km	42.2745°N 113.7094°W
Peak 7,096	7,096 ft 2163 m	837 ft 255 m	1.68 mi 2.7 km	42.0361°N 113.6919°W
Peak 7,063	7,060 ft 2152 m	364 ft 111 m	1.49 mi 2.4 km	42.0584°N 113.7317°W
Peak 7,038	7,037 ft 2145 m	499 ft 152 m	1.49 mi 2.4 km	42.0387°N 113.7425°W
Peak 6,856	6,857 ft 2090 m	466 ft 142 m	1.12 mi 1.8 km	42.3891°N 113.6491°W
Twin Sisters	6,837 ft 2084 m	377 ft 115 m	1.18 mi 1.9 km	42.0435°N 113.7208°W
Peak 6,821	6,821 ft 2079 m	322 ft 98 m	1.37 mi 2.2 km	42.0919°N 113.6701°W
Peak 6,388	6,388 ft 1947 m	407 ft 124 m	4.35 mi 7 km	42.2393°N 113.6112°W
Peak 6,342	6,342 ft 1933 m	443 ft 135 m	1.3 mi 2.1 km	42.2226°N 113.5983°W
Pine Knob	5,879 ft 1792 m	348 ft 106 m	1.55 mi 2.5 km	42.4111°N 113.6441°W

== Gallery ==
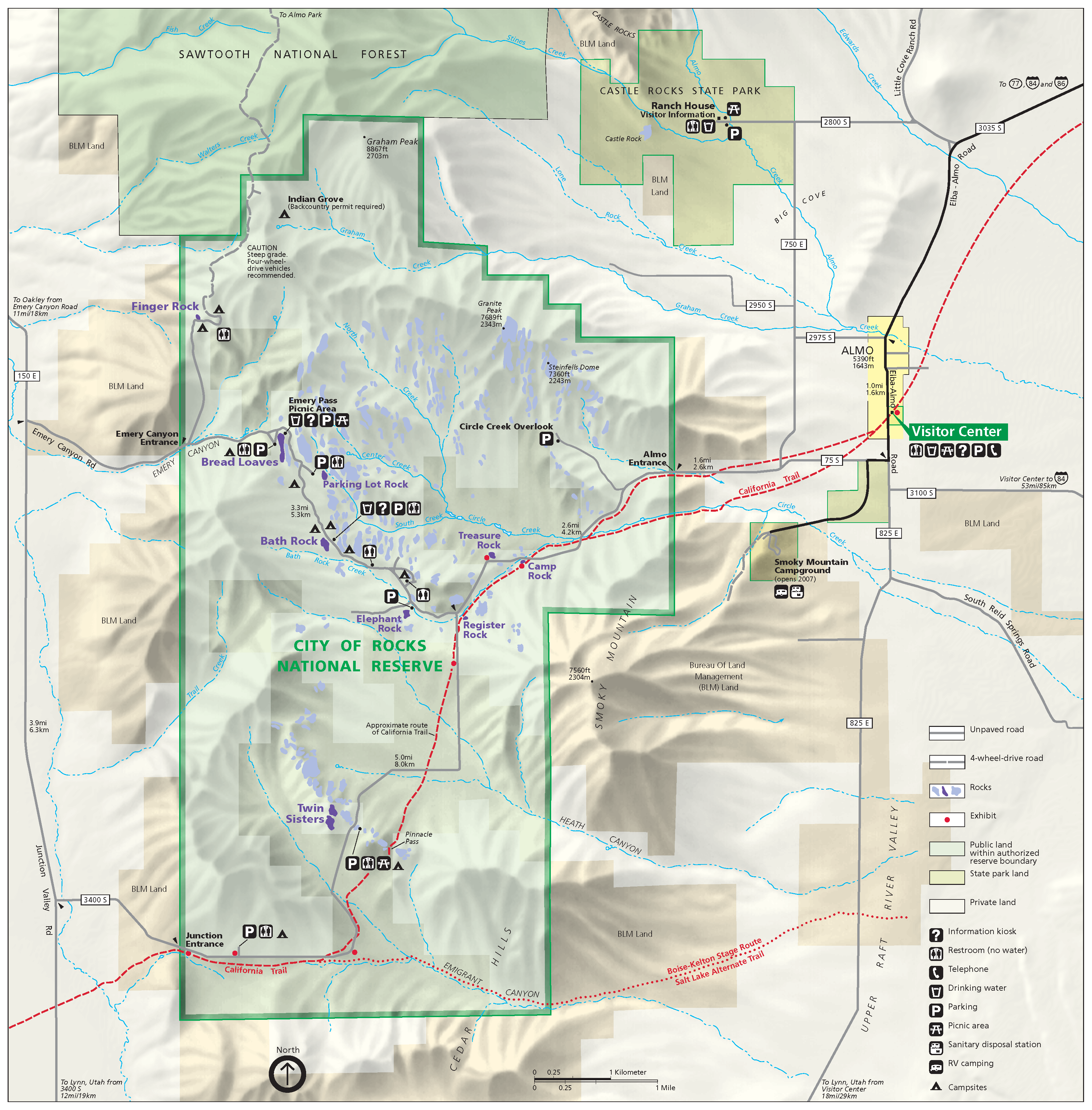
Map of City of Rocks and the southern Albion Range

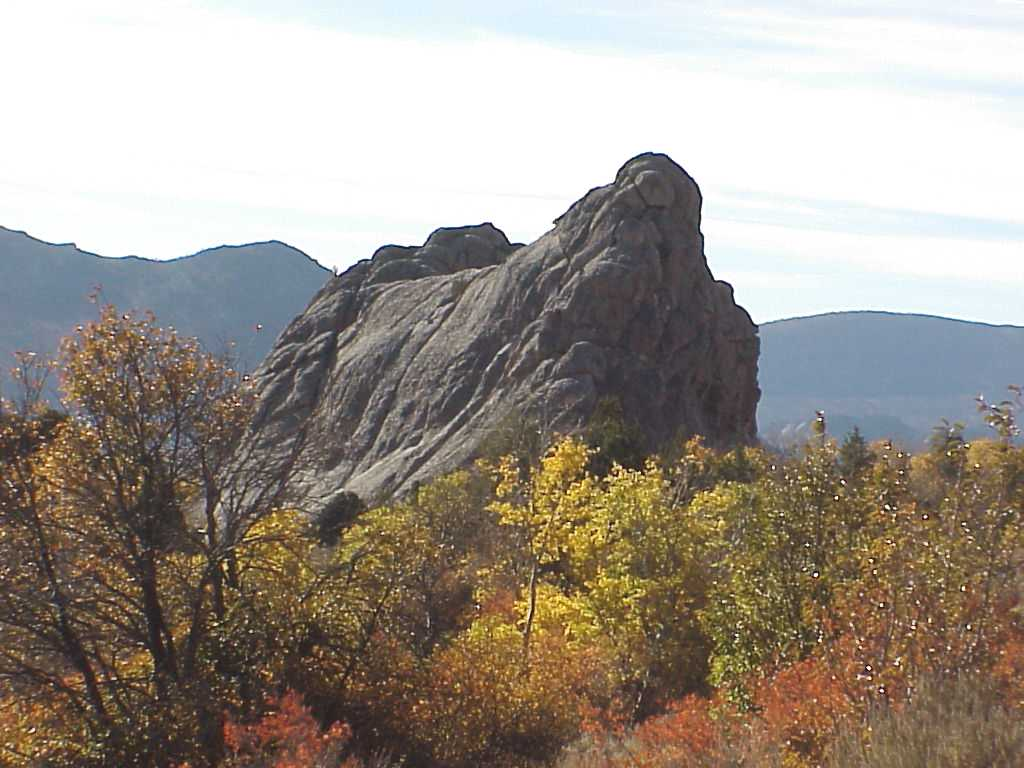
Bath Rock in the City of Rocks

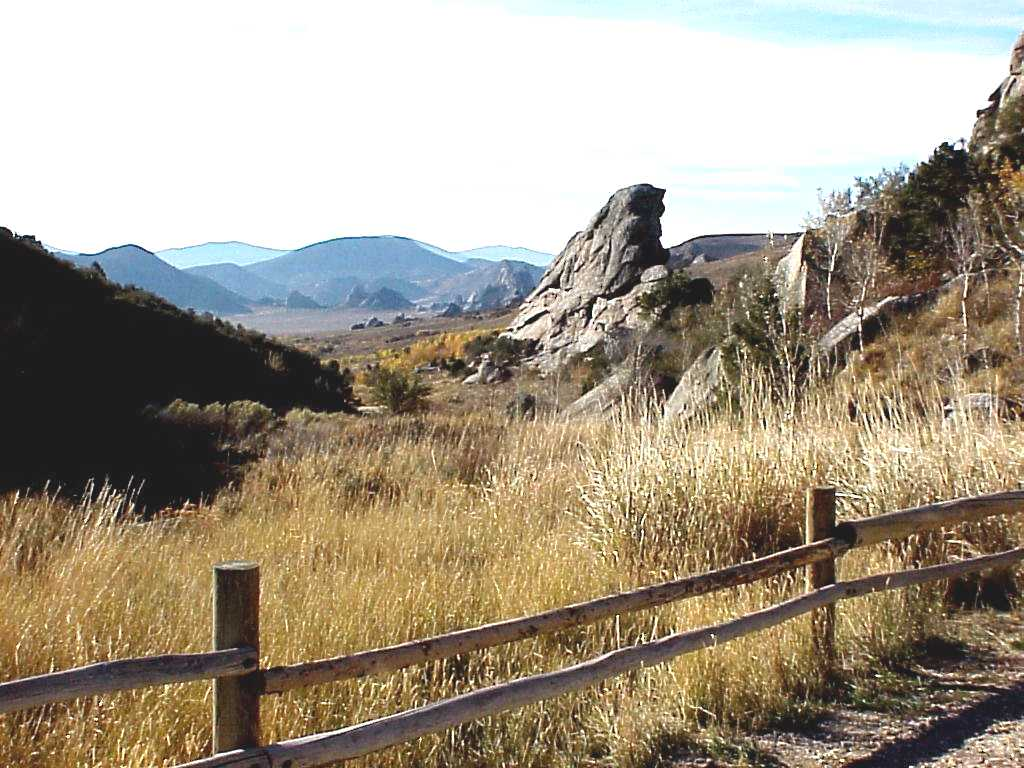
City of Rocks

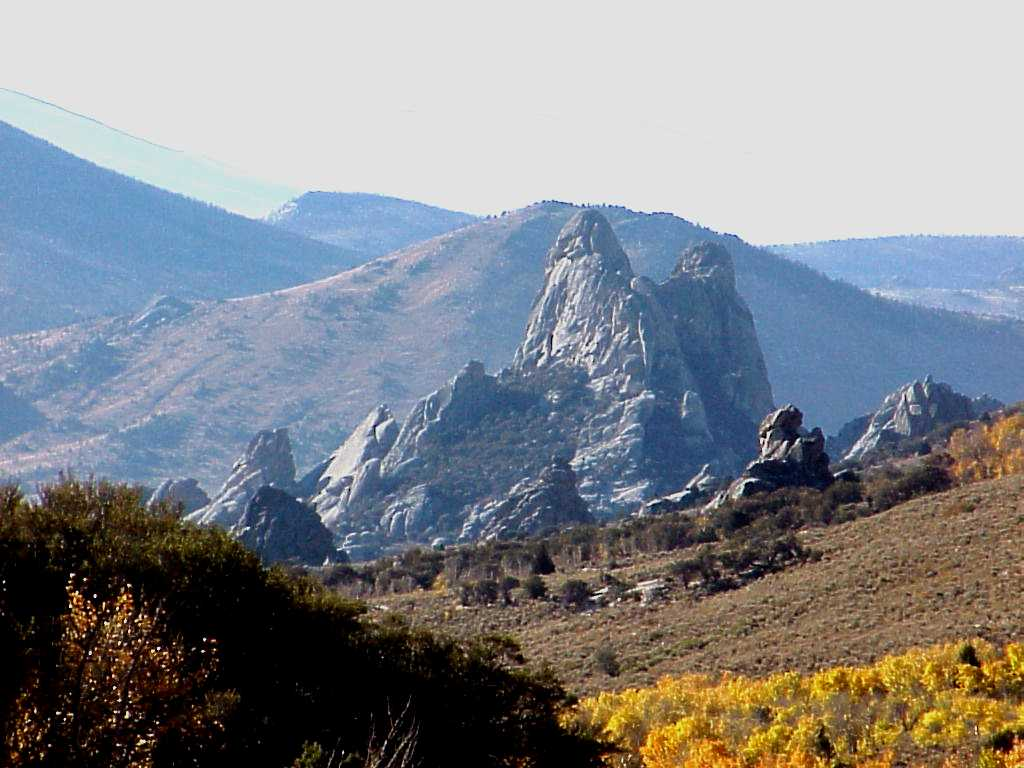
City of Rocks

== See also ==
- List of mountains of Idaho
- List of mountain peaks of Idaho
- List of mountain ranges in Idaho
