= Denton Darrington =

American politician, educator, and farmer from Idaho

Idaho State Senator
- In office December 1, 1982 – November 30, 2012
- Preceded by: Dean Van Engelen
- Succeeded by: Dean Cameron
- Constituency: 24th district Seat A (1984–1992); 25th district (1992–2002); 27th district (2002–2012)

Personal details
- Born: April 30, 1940 (age 86) Burley, Idaho
- Party: Republican
- Spouse: Virgene Lind Darrington
- Occupation: Farmer, teacher, politician

Denton Darrington (born April 30, 1940) is a former Republican Idaho State Senator serving from 1982 to 2012. He represented the Idaho 27th District which included all of Cassia County.

== Early life and career ==
Senator Denton Darrington was born in Burley, ID and currently lives in Declo, ID. He graduated from Declo High School. Darrington is married to Virgene Lind Darrington and they have five children. Darrington attends the Church of Jesus Christ of Latter-day Saints. Senator Denton Darrington has a B.S. in agriculture in 1963 and Post Graduate work from Utah State University. He also has Post Bachelor's work in Education from Idaho State University. Denton has been a farmer since 1965. He taught Idaho and American History for Burley Junior High School from 1966 to 1999. Darrington has been a member of many organizations, including Cassia County Farm Bureau, Cassia County Historical Society, and Mini-Cassia Chamber of Commerce. Also, he has made many travels. Denton has a wide range of Legislative experience and held many different positions. He served 15 terms with the Idaho State Senate from 1982 to 2012. Following redistricting in 2012 he declined to run against Republican State Senator Dean L. Cameron when the counties of Cassia and Minidoka were combined into a single legislative district.

== Elections ==
District 27 Senate - Cassia, Oneida, and Power Counties and a portion of Bingham County
Year	Candidate	Votes	Pct	Candidate	Votes	Pct
2002 Primary	Denton Darrington (incumbent)	3,141	59.6%	Moon Wheeler (incumbent)	2,131	40.4%
2002 General	Denton Darrington (incumbent)	8,758	100%			
2004 Primary	Denton Darrington (incumbent)	4,106	100%			
2004 General	Denton Darrington (incumbent)	11,273	100%			
2006 Primary	Denton Darrington (incumbent)	4,414	100%			
2006 General	Denton Darrington (incumbent)	8,786	100%			
2008 Primary	Denton Darrington (incumbent)	4,341	100%			
2008 General	Denton Darrington (incumbent)	11,667	100%			
2010 Primary	Denton Darrington (incumbent)	5,217	100%			
2010 General	Denton Darrington (incumbent)	8,705	100%			

== Honors ==
Darrington's many Honors:

- Outstanding Republican County Chairman – Republican Hall of Fame (1980)
- Outstanding Republican Legislator – Republican Hall of Fame (1986)
- Friend of Agriculture Award – Idaho Farm Bureau (1987–88, 1991–92, 2007–08)
- Outstanding Citizen, Farmer, Businessman – Burley Chamber of Commerce (1991)
- Legislator of the Year – National Republican Legislators Association (1994)
- Honorary Member of the Burley Kiwanis Club (1997)
- Idaho State Bar (1998)

== Legislative Experience ==
- Chairman of Health and Welfare Committee (1984–1988)
- Pacific NW Hazardous Waste Advisory Council, was appointed by Gov. Andrus (1988–1990)
- Executive Committee, NCSL (1988–91, 2006–09)
- Chairman of the Judiciary and Rules Committee (1988–present)
- Co-chairman of Select Committee on Education (1993)
- Chairman of Law and Criminal Justice Committee, NCSL (1993–94, 2003–04)
- Governor's Task Force on Adolescent Pregnancy (1994)
- Co-chairman of Legislative Council Interim Committee on Juvenile Justice (1994)
- Elected to Legislative Council by Senate Members (1994–1997)
- Member of State Affairs Committee (1994–present)
- Governor's Task Force for Alternative Sentencing (1995)
- Chairman of Interim Committee on Reapportionment (1995)
- Senate Representative on State Board of Education (1995)
- K-12 Rules Review Committee (1995)
- Co-chairman of Interim Committee on Criminal Justice
- Member of the Board of Juvenile Corrections, appointed by Gov. Kempthorne (1998–present)
- State Historical Records Advisory Board, appointed by Gov. Kempthorne (1999–2008)
- Task Force for Needs Assessment for Children's Mental Health (2000)
- Substance Abuse Revolving Fund Oversight Committee, appointed by Pres. Pro Tem Geddes (2000)
- Vice-chairman NCSL, Law and Justice Committee (2000, 2002, 2005–06)
- Millennium Fund Committee, appointed by Pres. Pro Tem Geddes (2000–present)
- Chairman of Millennium Fund Committee (2000–2005)
- NCSL, Elections Task Force (2001)
- Idaho Council on Children's Mental Health, appointed by Gov. Kempthorne (2001–08)
- Permanent Building Fund Advisory Council, appointed by Gov. Kempthorne (2001–present)
- Chairman of Idaho Council on Children's Mental Health (2004–08)
- NCSL Task Force on Homeland Security (2004–present)
- Chairman of Permanent Building Fund Advisory Council (2004–present)
- Governor's Criminal Justice Commission, appointed by Gov. Kempthorne (2005–present)
- Advisory Committee on Ada County Courthouse, appointed by Pres. Pro Tem Geddes)

== Travels ==
- Tour of France, England and Scotland (1988)
- Study Tour of Germany and Poland (1994)
- 3-Branch Roundtable on Federalism, Washington, D.C. (1998)
- NCSL Tour of Bavaria, Germany, Brussels, and Belgium (2004)
- Keynote, Brooking Institute, Washington, D.C. (2008)
