= Graham Peak (Idaho) =

Mountain in the state of Idaho

- Location within Idaho

Highest point
- Elevation: 8,867 ft (2,703 m)
- Prominence: 667 ft (203 m)
- Parent peak: Cache Peak
- Coordinates: 42°07′25″N 113°43′00″W

Geography
- Location: Cassia County, Idaho, U.S.
- Parent range: Albion Mountains
- Topo map: USGS Almo

Climbing
- Easiest route: Four wheel drive road

Graham Peak is the fourth highest peak in the Albion Mountains of Idaho, at 8,867 feet (2,703 m) above sea level. The peak is located in the City of Rocks National Reserve and Cassia County less than 0.2 mi (0.32 km) south of the Sawtooth National Forest border. It is located 5.13 mi (8.26 km) south-southwest of Cache Peak. Forest road 707 leads directly to the summit. The peak contains the smallest of the three known populations of Cymopterus davisii, estimated at 500–1000 individuals.

== See also ==
- List of mountains of Idaho
- List of mountain peaks of Idaho
- List of mountain ranges in Idaho
