= Independence Lake =

Independence Lake may refer to:

- Independence Lake (California)
- Independence Lake (Colorado)

== See also ==
- Lake Independence (disambiguation)
- Independence Lakes, a chain of lakes in Idaho
