= Lake Independence =

Lake Independence may refer to:

- Lake Independence (Michigan), a lake
- Lake Independence (Jackson County, Minnesota), a lake
- Lake Independence (Belize House constituency), Belize

== See also ==
- Independence Lake (disambiguation)
- Independence Lakes, a number of lakes in Idaho
