= Lake Cleveland =

Alpine lake in the state of Idaho

- Location within Idaho Location within the United States
- Location: Cassia County, Idaho
- Coordinates: 42°19′17″N 113°39′00″W
- Type: Glacial
- Primary outflows: Unnamed stream to Marsh Creek
- Basin countries: United States
- Max. length: 1,860 ft (570 m)
- Max. width: 790 ft (240 m)
- Surface elevation: 8,270 ft (2,520 m)

Lake Cleveland is an alpine lake in Cassia County, Idaho, United States, located in the Albion Mountains in Sawtooth National Forest. Lake Cleveland can easily be accessed via paved forest road 549. The lake is in the basin to the north of Mount Harrison. There are two campgrounds next to the lake with one at the east end and one at the west end of the lake. There are three other campgrounds in the area.
