= Springdale, Idaho =

Unincorporated community in Idaho, United States

- Unincorporated community
- Location within Idaho Location within the United States
- Coordinates: 42°30′56″N 113°41′27″W
- Country: United States
- State: Idaho
- County: Cassia
- Elevation: 4,193 ft (1,278 m)
- Time zone: UTC-7 (Mountain (MST))
  - Summer (DST): UTC-6 (MDT)
- ZIP codes: 83318
- Area codes: 208, 986
- GNIS feature ID: 398168

Springdale is an unincorporated community in Cassia County in the U.S. state of Idaho. The community is along State Highway 81, 5 mi (8.0 km) east of Burley and 3 mi (4.8 km) west of Declo. The Snake River flows immediately north of Springdale.
