= USS Cassia County =

1944 LST-491-class tank landing ship

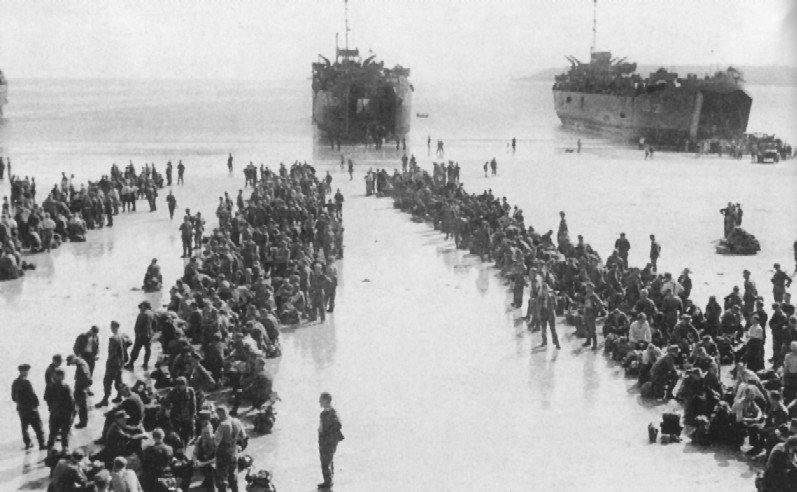
- LST-527 (center) and LST-542 (right) off St. Aubin's Bay, Jersey during "Operation Nestegg" with German prisoners of war lining up on the sands ready to embark for England, c. May 1945. LST-521 is just out of the picture to the left.

History

United States
- Name: USS LST-527, later USS Cassia County
- Namesake: Cassia County, Idaho
- Builder: Jeffersonville Boat and Machine Company, Jeffersonville, Indiana
- Laid down: 23 October 1943
- Launched: 3 January 1944
- Commissioned: 17 February 1944
- Decommissioned: 28 February 1945
- Recommissioned: 21 September 1950
- Decommissioned: 21 December 1956
- Renamed: USS Cassia County (LST-527), 1 July 1955
- Stricken: 1 October 1958
- Honours and awards: 1 battle star (World War II); 2 battle stars (Korea)
- Fate: Sunk as a target, 3 March 1959

General characteristics
- Class & type: LST-491-class tank landing ship
- Displacement: 1,780 long tons (1,809 t) light; 3,640 long tons (3,698 t) full
- Length: 328 ft (100 m)
- Beam: 50 ft (15 m)
- Draft: Unloaded : 2 ft 4 in (0.71 m) forward; 7 ft 6 in (2.29 m) aft; Loaded : 8 ft 2 in (2.49 m) forward; 14 ft 1 in (4.29 m) aft
- Propulsion: 2 × General Motors 12-567 diesel engines, two shafts, twin rudders
- Speed: 12 knots (22 km/h; 14 mph)
- Boats & landing craft carried: 2 LCVPs
- Troops: Approximately 140 officers and enlisted men
- Complement: 8-10 officers, 100-115 enlisted men
- Armament: 1 × single 3"/50 caliber gun mount; 8 × 40 mm guns; 12 × 20 mm guns

USS Cassia County (LST-527) was an LST-491-class tank landing ship built for the United States Navy during World War II. Named for Cassia County, Idaho, she was the only U.S. Naval vessel to bear the name. USS Cassia County is recognized for service in World War II during the Invasion of Normandy, and in the Korean War.

== Construction ==
In 1938, the Jeffersonville Boat and Machine Company was founded in Jeffersonville, Indiana, and later took over orders in a shipyard leased to the company by the US Navy in 1942. From this point, Jeffersonville Boat and Machine Co. became a supplier of Navy and military ships; particularly the Landing Ship Tank during World War II. LST-527 was laid down on 23 October 1943, meaning that construction on the ship's foundation officially began on this date. By 3 January 1944 LST-527 was launched, making her way to water.

== Service history ==
During World War II, LST-527 was assigned to the European Theater and participated in the Invasion of Normandy from 6–25 June 1944. The role of tank landing ships was to drop off supplies, vehicles, and troops to shores without a docking site. LST-527 was decommissioned on 28 February 1945 as World War II neared its end.

As a result of hostilities in Korea, LST-527 was recommissioned on 21 September 1950. She participated in two campaigns during the Korean War; the Second Korean Winter on 11–12 January 1952 and 21–28 February 1952, and the Korean Summer-Fall on 7–17 May 1953, 29 May – 11 June 1953, 16–17 June 1953, and 27 July 1953. The vessel was renamed Cassia County (LST-527) on 1 July 1955.

She was decommissioned for the last time on 21 December 1956, and struck from the Naval Vessel Register on 1 October 1958. Cassia County earned one battle star for World War II service and two battle stars for Korean service. Cassia County was sunk as a target on 3 March 1959.
