= Oakley Junior/Senior High School =

American public secondary school in Idaho

Coordinates: 42°14′37″N 113°53′25″W

Location
- 455 West Main Oakley, Idaho 83346

Information
- School type: Public
- Established: c. 1900
- School board: Cassia County School District
- NCES District ID: 1600660
- NCES School ID: 160066000132
- Faculty: 15.07 (FTE)
- Enrollment: 178 (2023–2024)
- Student to teacher ratio: 11.81
- Schedule type: Trimester
- Colors: Red and white
- Team name: Hornets
- Website: www.cassiaschools.org/o/ohs

The Oakley Junior/Senior High School is a public secondary school located on Main Street in Oakley, Idaho. It is part of the Cassia County School District.

== History ==
The original Oakley Junior/Senior High School was built in the early 1900s. In 1995, residents advocated for a new building, rather than using $1.5 million of the Cassia County bond issue proposal to upgrade the old building with a "planned auditorium, eight new classrooms and new heating system in the existing building".

The current school building was constructed in 1997.

== Description ==
Enrollment at Oakley in 2021-2022 was 205 students in grades 7 through 12, allowing for a personal one-on-one education experience for the students with the teachers. Oakley is a Title I school, with 20% of students qualifying for free or reduced price lunch under the National School Lunch Act of 1946.

The school's mascot is the hornet. The colors are red, black, and white.

== Curriculum ==
In 1995, Oakley pioneered a trimester system, to give students three grading periods, allowing them to pick up to an extra credit per year. Students attend five 70-minute classes daily, fulfilling state time requirements in each class. In the third trimester students have more elective choices.

Dual credit college courses and Idaho Digital Learning Alliance courses are offered, as well as honors courses in English and history.

== Assessments ==
Oakley Junior/Senior High School is known in its school district and in the state for high standardized test scores. In 2004, Oakley received a distinguished school award, the Additional Yearly Growth award, one of 15 schools in the state "that increased their percent of proficient or advanced students by at least 10 percent in either reading or math. The top 5 percent of schools that have significantly reduced a score gap between student groups receive the distinguished schools designation." In 2006, Oakley ranked in the top 10 percent of state high schools, based in part of students' reading scores on the Idaho Standards Achievement Test.
