= J. R. Simplot =

American businessman

J. R. "Jack" Simplot
- Born: John Richard Simplot; January 4, 1909; Dubuque, Iowa, U.S.
- Died: May 25, 2008 (aged 99); Boise, Idaho, U.S.
- Resting place: Morris Hill Cemetery, Boise, Idaho
- Education: Eighth grade dropout
- Known for: Founder of the J. R. Simplot Company
- Spouses: Ruby Adeline Rosevear (m. 1931; div. 1960) Esther Becker (m. 1972)
- Children: 4, including Scott

John Richard Simplot (/ˈsɪmplɒt/; January 4, 1909 – May 25, 2008) was an American entrepreneur and businessman best known as the founder of the J. R. Simplot Company, a Boise, Idaho–based agricultural supplier specializing in potato products. In 2007, he was estimated to be the 89th-richest person in the United States, at $3.6 billion. At the time of his death at age 99 in May 2008, he was the oldest billionaire on the Forbes 400.

== Early life ==
Born in Dubuque, Iowa, he was the third of six children of Charles R. and Dorothy (Haxby) Simplot. A year later in 1910, the family relocated a thousand miles (1,600 km) west to homestead in the newly irrigated Magic Valley of south central Idaho; the Minidoka Dam on the Snake River was completed a few years earlier. After differences with his father, Simplot left school in the eighth grade at age 14 in 1923, then worked on a farm near Declo in Cassia County. He developed a low-cost method for feeding hogs when the market fell, feeding them wild horse meat and potatoes. When the market recovered, Simplot sold his hogs at a profit and got into the potato and vegetable processing business.

Simplot's maternal grandmother was English, as were both parents of both his maternal grandfather and paternal grandmother. His paternal great-grandparents were French: Henry Simplot (1806–1846) of Besançon and Susan Le Clare (1811–1876). Both emigrated to the United States in their teens and first met in upstate New York at Parish, where they married in 1831. After living there and Illinois, the couple settled in Dubuque in 1836. Their second son was Charles Le Clare Simplot (1838–1900), father of Charles Richard Simplot (1883–1974).

== J. R. Simplot Company ==
By World War II, the J. R. Simplot Company had become the largest shipper of fresh potatoes in the nation.

In 1967, Simplot and McDonald's Corporation founder Ray Kroc agreed by handshake that the Simplot Company would provide frozen french fries to the restaurant chain. Previously, restaurants had cut potatoes at each location for fresh french fries, but the favored russet potato was not available for three months in the summer, leading to a quality control problem. Simplot was able to supply frozen russet potatoes all year long. By 1972, all fries were frozen. The frozen fry deal led to expansion of Simplot potato processing plants and construction in 1977 of a new plant at Hermiston, Oregon. By 2005, Simplot supplied more than half of all french fries for the fast food chain. Simplot also produces fertilizers for agriculture.

Simplot retired as president of his company in 1973, but remained as chairman until 1994. He held the title of chairman emeritus until his death in 2008. Simplot received an honorary degree from Utah State University in Logan in 2001, honoring him for his many contributions to the agricultural industry of America, particularly the Intermountain West.

Simplot was responsible for the Potato Bust of 1976, after making massive short plays he refused to honor those contracts. This resulted in millions in dollars of losses for the New York Merchant Exchange. A public outcry followed, and the newly created Commodity Futures Trading Commission held hearings.

Further enhancing his enormous wealth, the J.R. Simplot Company provided startup capital in the early 1980s for the fledgling Micron Technology, a Boise-based manufacturer of computer memory chips; in 1994, he owned a 20% stake in the company. Additionally, he invested heavily in Remington Oil.

In 1961, Simplot financed the Brundage Mountain ski area near McCall, two hours north of Boise. The Simplot Company sold its 50% interest in Brundage in April 2006 to the longtime co-owner, the DeBoer family. In the early 1950s, Simplot was the benefactor to the fledgling Bogus Basin ski area near Boise when it had financial difficulties; the base area lodge is named in his honor.

In 1995, the J.R. Simplot Company expanded into Australia, acquiring iconic food brands like Birds Eye, Leggo's, Chiko, and Edgell.

== Personal ==
Simplot's first marriage was to Ruby Rosevear (1911–2004) of Glenns Ferry, whom he had met on a blind date; he proposed to her in his Model A Ford in 1931. After 29 years and four children, the marriage ended in divorce in 1960, when she suddenly left Simplot for another man. Years later, Simplot admitted that while he was growing his business empire in the 1950s, he had not spent enough time with his family.

Simplot met his second wife, Esther Becker (born 1934 in Omro, Wisconsin), a former opera singer, in the mid-1960s in New York City. He was on a business trip and she was working as a receptionist for the Henry Phipps Foundation; they were married in 1972.

In his final years, Simplot and Esther resided in the Grove Hotel building in downtown Boise, a few blocks from the company's headquarters. The couple donated their sizable hilltop home (built in 1979) in Boise's north end to the state of Idaho in late 2004 for use as a governor's mansion. (Known as "The Idaho House," it was returned to the Simplot family in 2013, and demolished in January 2016.)

== Accident ==
On January 1, 2007, while attending the Fiesta Bowl in Glendale, Arizona, with his wife and son, Simplot fell from a motorized scooter and suffered a cranial hematoma. He was taken to St. Joseph's Hospital and Medical Center in Phoenix, where he spent his 98th birthday. Simplot returned to Idaho several days later for further rehabilitation.

== Death ==
Simplot died suddenly at his home at age 99 on May 25, 2008, with his wife at his side, following a bout of pneumonia from which he appeared to be recovering. His death occurred moments after he had invited a friend to his home to play cards.

Simplot was survived by his wife, two sons (Don and Scott), and daughter Gay, the first wife of former governor Butch Otter; eldest son Richard died in 1993 at age 59. Simplot was interred at Morris Hill Cemetery in Boise.

In 1996, Simplot was inducted into the Hall of Great Westerners of the National Cowboy & Western Heritage Museum.

== Awards and honors ==
- Golden Plate Award of the American Academy of Achievement (1967)
- Hall of Great Westerners of the National Cowboy & Western Heritage Museum (1996)
- Honorary degree from Utah State University in Logan (2001)

== See also ==
- Jack's Urban Meeting Place (JUMP)
