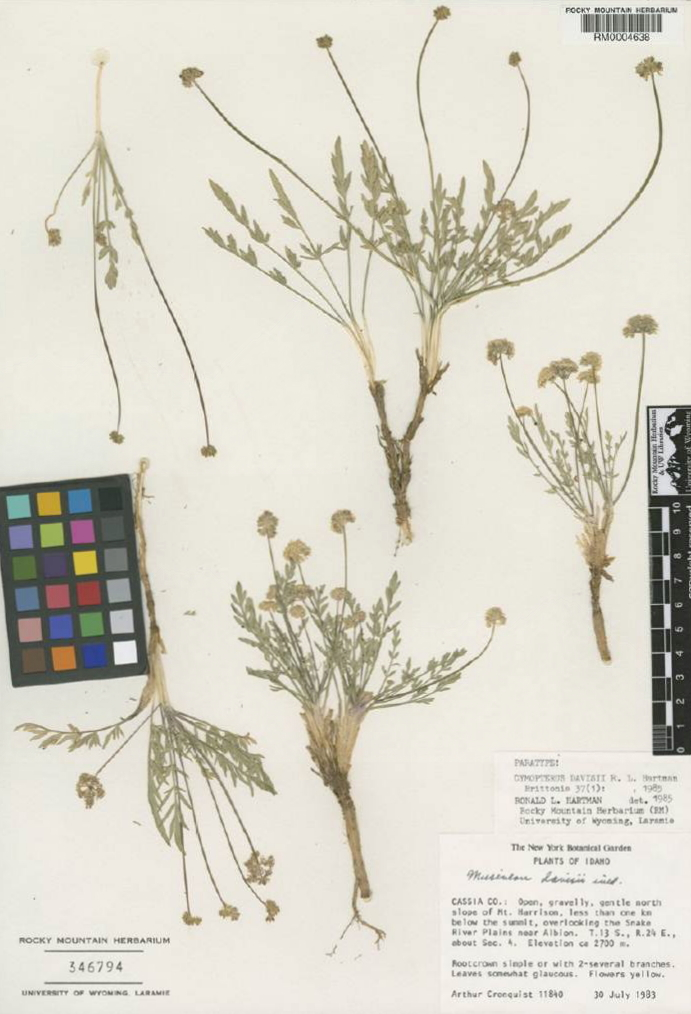

Conservation status
- Vulnerable (NatureServe)

Scientific classification
- Kingdom: Plantae
- Clade: Tracheophytes
- Clade: Angiosperms
- Clade: Eudicots
- Clade: Asterids
- Order: Apiales
- Family: Apiaceae
- Genus: Cymopterus
- Species: C. davisii

Binomial name
- Cymopterus davisii R.L.Hartman

= Cymopterus davisii =

Species of flowering plant

Cymopterus davisii is a species of flowering plant in the carrot family known by the common name Davis's springparsley. This small, flat, taprooted perennial is endemic to Idaho in the United States, where it occurs in the Albion Mountains. The plant is found in the Albion Division of the Minidoka Ranger District of Sawtooth National Forest. It reaches approximately 7 in (18 cm) in height with a short stem that is sheathed by fibrous leaf bases. Numerous leaves form a whorl around yellow-flowered umbels.

Davis's springparsley was first collected by Ray J. Davis in 1939, who was a botany professor at Idaho State University. However, it was not identified as a new species until 1985 by Ron Hartman, who named it after Davis.

There are three known populations of the plant. The two most extensive are on Mount Independence (a single population with Cache Peak) and Mount Harrison, and there is a smaller population to the south on Graham Peak. It occurs in alpine communities that include another Albion Mountains endemic, Christ's Indian paintbrush.
