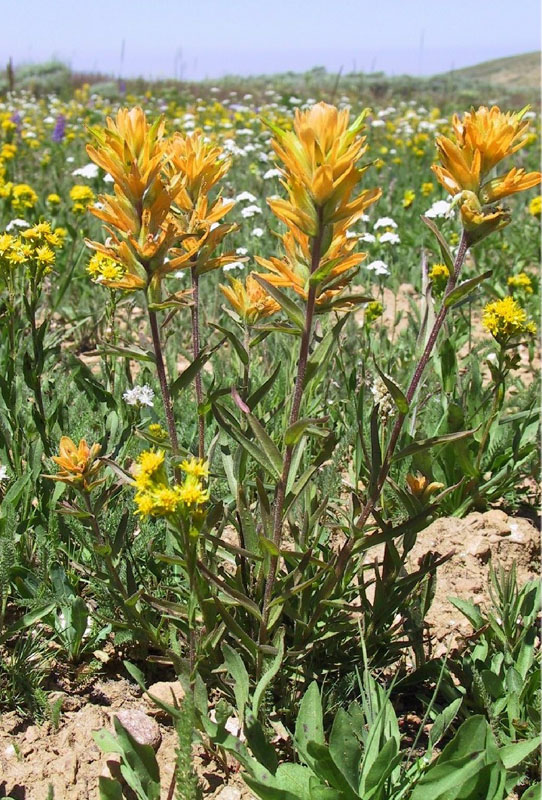

Conservation status
- Critically Imperiled (NatureServe)

Scientific classification
- Kingdom: Plantae
- Clade: Tracheophytes
- Clade: Angiosperms
- Clade: Eudicots
- Clade: Asterids
- Order: Lamiales
- Family: Orobanchaceae
- Genus: Castilleja
- Species: C. christii

Binomial name
- Castilleja christii N.H.Holmgren

= Castilleja christii =

Species of flowering plant

Castilleja christii is a rare species of flowering plant in the family Orobanchaceae known by the common name Christ's Indian paintbrush. It is endemic to Idaho in the United States, where there is a single population on Mount Harrison in the Albion Mountains in the Minidoka Ranger District of Sawtooth National Forest. It is one of Idaho's rarest plants.

This plant was named for John Henry Christ (1896–1973), who first collected it. It is a perennial herb with a cluster of several erect stems 15 to 30 centimetres (5.9 to 11.8 inches) tall. The lance-shaped leaves are a few centimeters long and may be divided into lobes. The inflorescence is covered in glandular hairs. It contains many lance-shaped yellow or orange bracts and flower corollas 2 to 3 centimetres (0.79 to 1.18 inches) long. Blooming occurs in July and August. The plant reproduces by seed.

This plant grows near the mountain summit at an elevation of 9,100 feet (2,800 metres), where deep snow accumulates and sometimes lasts into the summer or year-round. It occurs in grassy meadow habitat alongside Festuca idahoensis and Elymus trachycaulus, a snowbed habitat with Solidago multiradiata, Erigeron peregrinus, Lupinus argenteus, and Cymopterus davisii, and openings in sagebrush. The climate is subalpine. The soils are shallow and there are no trees.

The only population of this plant is managed by the Sawtooth National Forest. The population fluctuates in numbers, sometimes reaching over one million individuals, but is declining overall. The main threat to the species is habitat loss, which has occurred with the construction of roads in the area. Some vehicles also go off-road, despite barriers to prevent this activity. Some cattle grazing occurs in the habitat, but fencing protects some parts of it. Smooth brome (Bromus inermis) has been introduced into the habitat, where it is a noxious weed.
