= Scott Simplot =

Chairman and chief executive officer of the J.R. Simplot Company

- Education: University of Idaho (BA); University of Pennsylvania (MBA)
- Occupation: Businessman
- Employer: J.R. Simplot Company
- Father: J.R. Simplot

Scott Simplot (born 1947) is the American chairman and chief executive officer of the J.R. Simplot Company and formerly the wealthiest man in Idaho.

== Early life and education ==
Simplot is the youngest son of J.R. Simplot, the founder of the diversified agriculture company J.R. Simplot Company, and his first wife Rudy Rosevear. He received a Bachelor of Science in Business from the University of Idaho in 1968 and went on to earn a Masters in Business Administration (MBA) from the Wharton School at the University of Pennsylvania in 1973.

== Career ==
Simplot first obtained a seat on the J.R. Simplot Company board of directors in 1970 and was hired as the company's director of planning and information technology in 1973, following his graduation from Wharton. He was quickly promoted to more senior positions and became chairman of the board of directors in 2001 after he reportedly "pushed out" his father, J.R.; the two adopted different approaches to management.

During his time at J.R. Simplot Company, Simplot has been credited with engineering the company's lucrative early-stage investment in Micron Technology, which grew to 22-percent of that company by 1996. He is also responsible for the company's 2003 purchase of the Australian arm of John West Foods.

In addition to his seat on the J.R. Simplot Company board, he also serves on the boards of directors of nearly a dozen other companies. In 2016, Forbes named him the wealthiest man in Idaho, with an estimated net worth of $2.1 billion.

== Personal life ==
Bloomberg News described Simplot as being "unassuming, with a thoughtful, almost professorial air," a marked contrast to his gregarious father, which was reflected in their different management styles with J.R. acting on hunches and Scott preferring detailed analysis of potential business actions. He is divorced and has two daughters. His sister, Gay Simplot, is also a billionaire and works with Scott in running the J.R. Simplot company. Gay is divorced from the former Governor of Idaho, Butch Otter.

In 2004 Simplot received an honorary doctorate in Administrative Science from the University of Idaho in recognition of "lifelong achievement, public service, and significant contributions to the state of Idaho and the nation."
