= Oakley Academy =

Defunct high school in Idaho, United States

The Oakley Academy was a high school operated by the Church of Jesus Christ of Latter-day Saints (LDS Church) located in Oakley, Idaho. It was founded in 1901. By 1906, it had 130 students and six teachers, and its building and grounds were valued at $12,000.
