= Howells Opera House =

Historic Opera house in Idaho

Coordinates: 42°14′40″N 113°53′03″W

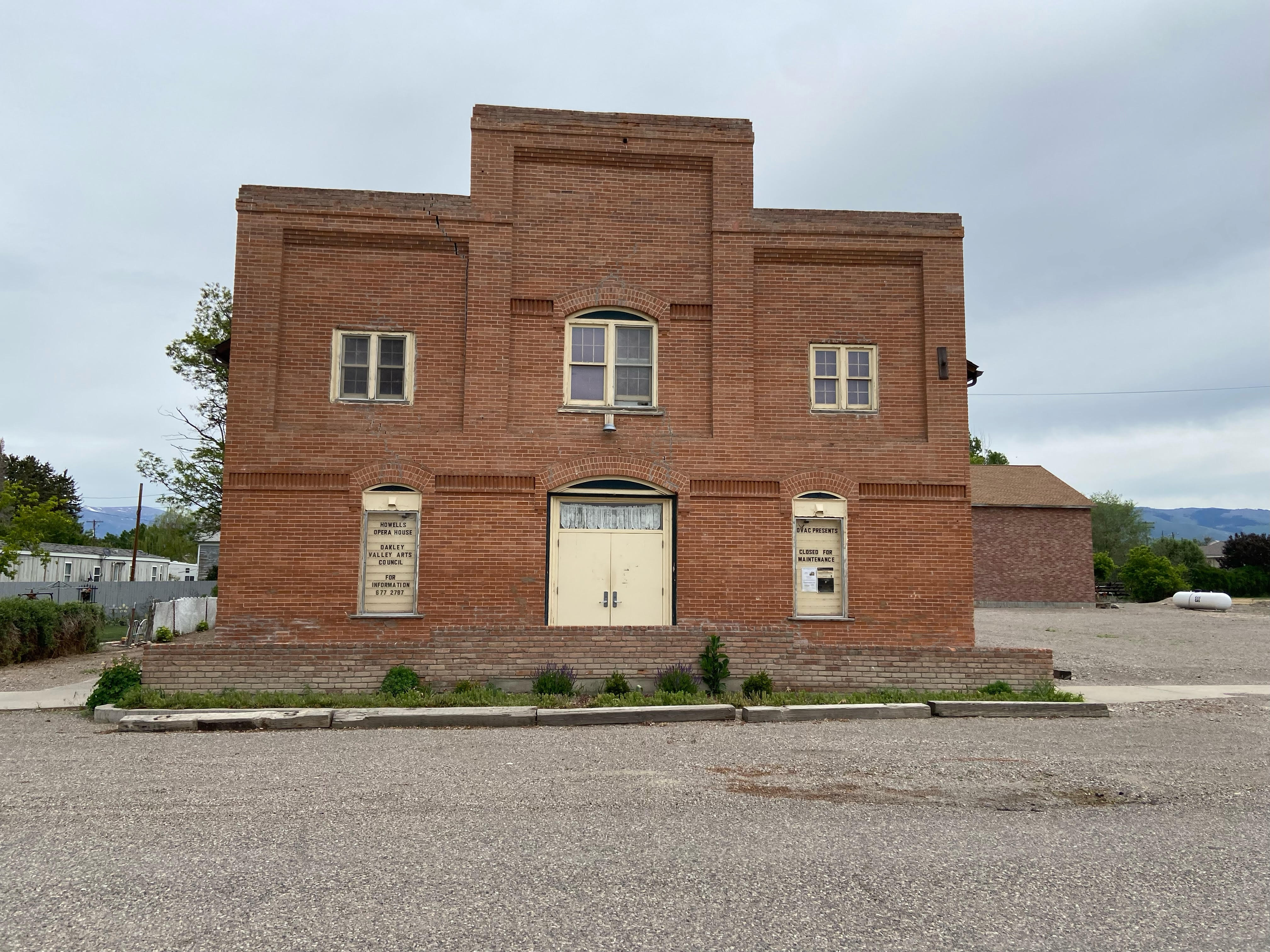
Howells Opera house 2022

Howells Opera House is a historic opera house located in Oakley, Idaho, on Blaine Street. The opera house is registered with the Idaho State Historical Society. The Opera house was built by the first prosecuting attorney for Cassia County, Judge B.P. (Benjamin Price) Howells. The building construction began in 1904 and was completed in 1907 for the cost of $22,000 ($757,000 adjusted for inflation today). The opera House is currently owned and operated by the Oakley Valley Arts Council. It has been known by several names, including the Oakley Playhouse (c. 1907), Cassia County Playhouse (c. 1929), and most notably as the Howells Opera House.

== Description ==
The opera house has a square gable false front with a central door flanked by segmental-arched openings. The building was constructed using a local variety of quartzite referred to as Oakley stone. The performance floor features seating for around 300 people.

== Performance history ==
The Oakley Valley Arts Council has kept a record of performances from 1974 to the present. Past performances include such operas as The Diary of Anne Frank, The Mikado, and The Pirates of Penzance.

History (ѧ denotes an opera performance)
Year	March	July	November
1974		Fiddler on the Roof	
1975			
1976		Title of Liberty	
1977			
1978		Oklahoma!	
1979			
1980			
1981	Hello, Dolly!		
1982	Annie Get Your Gun		
1983	Oliver!		
1984	The Sound of Music		
1985	My Fair Lady		
1986	Paint Your Wagon		
1987	Annie		
1988	Seven Brides for Seven Brothers		
1989	The Music Man		
1990	South Pacific	Critic's Choice	
1991	Oklahoma!		Arsenic and Old Lace
1992	Kiss Me, Kate		
1993	Guys and Dolls	The Golden Fleecing	Steel Magnolias
1994	The Unsinkable Molly Brown	The Wizard of Oz	The Foreigner
1995	The King and I	Joseph and the Amazing Technicolor Dreamcoat	Blithe Spirit
1996	Calamity Jane	The Pirates of Penzance ѧ	Nunsense
1997	Camelot	Bye Bye Birdie	The Odd Couple
1998	The Mikado ѧ	Cinderella	Forever Plaid
1999	Fiddler on the Roof	Seven Brides for Seven Brothers	Charley's Aunt
2000	The Sound of Music	Into the Woods	Nunsense II
2001	Once Upon a Mattress	Damn Yankees	Nuncrackers
2002	You're a Good Man, Charlie Brown	Joseph and the Amazing Technicolor Dreamcoat	A Funny Thing Happened on the Way to the Forum
2003	The Fantasticks	Annie Get Your Gun	You Can't Take It with You
2004	Annie	The Ark	The Diary of Anne Frank ѧ
2005	Guys and Dolls	Crazy for You	The Secret Garden
2006	West Side Story	Tom Sawyer	Harvey
2007	Hello, Dolly!	Oklahoma!	Little Shop of Horrors
2008	Frog and Toad	Seussucal the Musical	Plaid Tidings
2009	Oliver!	Paint Your Wagon	
2010	The Pirates of Penzance ѧ	Bye Bye Birdie	The Nerd
2011	Singin' in the Rain	Footloose	Jacob Marley's Christmas Carol
2012	Dear Edwina	The Wizard of Oz	White Christmas
2013	Arsenic and Old Lace	Seven Brides for Seven Brothers	Clue
2014	The 39 Steps	Once Upon a Mattress	Scrooge!
2015	Meshuggah-nuns!	Who Shot Pablito Chanchito?	It's a Wonderful Life ѧ
2016	Something's Afoot!	Calamity Jane	Curtains
2017	Tom Sawyer	Joseph and the Amazing Technicolor Dreamcoat	The Man Who Came to Dinner
2018	Walking Happy	Annie	The Christmas Schooner
2019	Greater Tuna	Chitty Chitty Bang Bang	Forever Plaid
2020	A Christmas Story	The Scarlet Pimpernel	Let's Murder Marsha
2021	A Christmas Story	The Scarlett Pimpernel	Let's Murder Marsha

== Oakley Valley Arts Council ==
During the 1970s, when the opera house had fallen into a state of disrepair and demolition of the house was being discussed, the performing arts community within Oakley formed the Oakley Valley Arts Council and purchased the house. Today the Oakley Valley Arts Council continues to put on seasonal performances here.

== Ghostlore ==
The opera house is the subject of several ghostlore stories. One story suggests that there is a female apparition with black hair who can be seen watching the performances from behind the stage. Another story relates that an older gentleman's ghost can be seen stalking the grounds of the house, with some variations suggesting that this particular ghost is that of original owner, Benjamin Howells.
