= Independence Lakes =

- Location within Idaho
- Location: Cassia County, Idaho
- Coordinates: 42.1975°N 113.6635°W
- Type: Glacial lakes
- Basin countries: United States

The Independence Lakes are a chain of four alpine glacial lakes in Cassia County, Idaho, United States, located in the Albion Mountains in Sawtooth National Forest. The lakes are located in the basin north of Cache Peak and east of Mount Independence in the upper portion of the Green Creek watershed. The lakes have not been individually named, and trail 805 leads to the lakes. The closest trailhead is the Independence Lakes trailhead at the end of forest road 728.

Independence Lakes
Lake	Elevation	Max. length	Max. width	Location
Independence Lake 1	8,880 ft (2,710 m)	650 ft (200 m)	340 ft (100 m)	42.201119°N 113.661586°W
Independence Lake 2	9,050 ft (2,760 m)	1,600 ft (490 m)	600 ft (180 m)	42.199010°N 113.668387°W
Independence Lake 3	9,120 ft (2,780 m)	520 ft (160 m)	375 ft (114 m)	42.194887°N 113.669024°W
Independence Lake 4	9,200 ft (2,800 m)	610 ft (190 m)	300 ft (91 m)	42.192961°N 113.670398°W
