= Raft River Jr./Sr. High School =

Coordinates: 42.3077°N 113.3723°W

Raft River High School

Location
- 55 N First W Malta, Cassia, Idaho 83342; United States

Information
- Type: Public
- Superintendent: James Shank
- Principal: Eric Boden
- Staff: 15.10 (FTE)
- Grades: 7-12
- Enrollment: 158 (2023-2024)
- Student to teacher ratio: 10.46
- Language: English
- Campus: Small town, Rural
- Colors: Blue; Gold
- Athletics: IHSAA Class 1A
- Athletics conference: Snake River
- Team name: Trojans
- Website: www.cassiaschools.org/o/rrjhs

Raft River Jr/Sr High School is located in Malta, Idaho and teaches grades 7–12. The first school building was built in 1883 and had around 25 students. A brick building was built in 1902. The high school moved to a new facility in 1955. The current enrollment is 149.
