= Simplot =

American agriculture company

J. R. Simplot Company
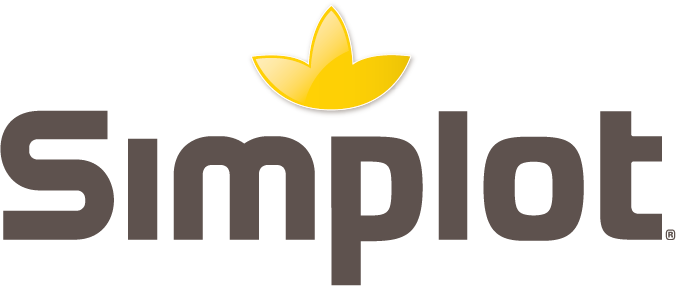
- Type: Private
- Founded: 1929; 97 years ago in Declo, Idaho, U.S.
- Founder: J. R. Simplot
- Headquarters: Boise, Idaho, U.S.
- Key people: Garrett Lofto (President & CEO); Scott Simplot (Chair)
- Revenue: ▲US$6.0 billion (2020)
- Number of employees: 11,000
- Website: simplot.com

The J. R. Simplot Company (commonly referred to as Simplot) is an agribusiness company headquartered in Boise, Idaho, United States.

== History ==
Simplot was founded in 1929 by 20-year-old John Richard Simplot near the agricultural community of Declo in south central Idaho. During the early 1940s, the business expanded, providing the military with dehydrated onions and potatoes during World War II. The firm was incorporated as the J. R. Simplot Company in 1955.

Simplot made billions from the commercialization of frozen French fries by one of its scientists, chemist Ray L. Dunlap. By the early 1970s, it was the primary supplier of French fries to McDonald's. By 2005 it supplied more than half of all French fries for the fast food chain. Simplot also produces fertilizers for agriculture, the mining of which has been a cause of recent environmental concerns.

Simplot is now one of the largest privately owned companies in the world (ranked 54th in Private Companies by Forbes magazine in 2020), ⁣ with $7.6B in revenue and 13,000 employees. It has branches in Australia, Canada, Mexico, China, and several other regions. One of the major plants is in Caldwell, Idaho.

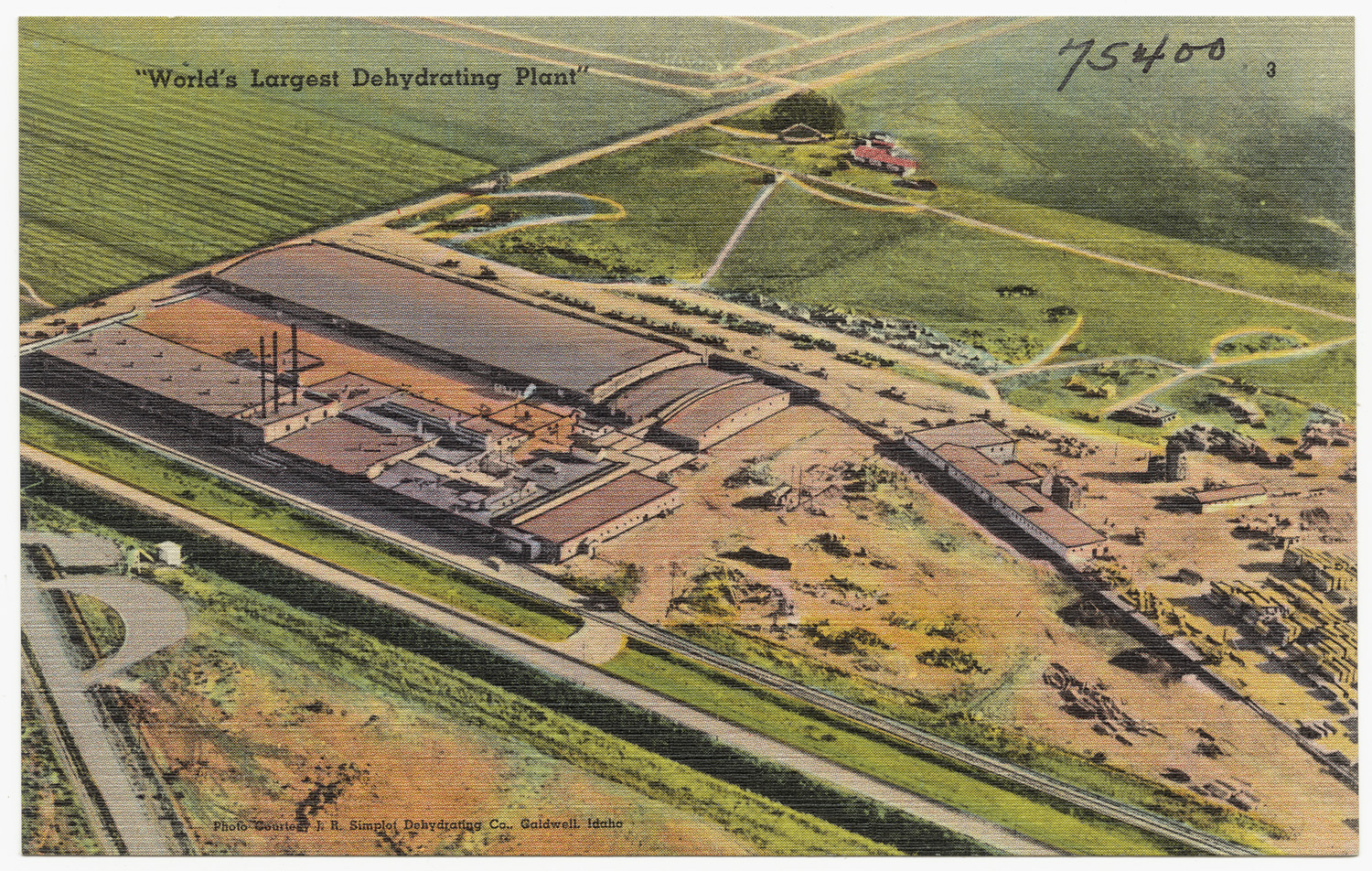
A view of the Simplot plant in Caldwell, Idaho, circa 1930–1945. The caption in the image states "World's Largest Dehydrating Plant."

J. R. Simplot retired from his role as president of his company in 1973, but remained actively involved for numerous years thereafter. He later relinquished his position as chairman of the board in 1994, and held the title of Chairman Emeritus until his passing at age 99 in 2008.

In 2022, Simplot acquired the Ore-Ida potato processing facility in Ontario, Oregon; Kraft Heinz retains ownership of the Ore-Ida brand, which is now produced by Simplot under a long-term agreement.

In 2025 Simplot acquired the Belgian Clarebout Potatoes.

== False labelling ==
In 2026, independent testing found that tomatoes from Xinjiang were being sold as Leggo “Australian grown”.

The company has publicly refuted these claims

== Philanthropy ==
Since its founding, J. R. Simplot Company has contributed to numerous local organizations and causes, including Ronald McDonald House, WWF-Australia, Boys and Girls Clubs, Future Farmers of America, St. Luke's Children's Hospital, and the Special Olympics. Much of the company's philanthropic efforts are directed by employees serving on the company's volunteer service committee. The Simplot Company has donated thousands of pounds of potatoes to the Idaho Foodbank and the Boise Rescue Mission. They have also provided monetary support for the arts throughout Idaho including Ballet Idaho, Opera Idaho, and the Boise Philharmonic.

In 2009, Simplot Company was awarded the Spirit of Treasure Valley award by the United Way of Treasure Valley.

== Environmental record ==
In February 2002, Simplot agreed to buy equipment and pay penalties related to an unreported release of 80,000 pounds of sulphur dioxide from a facility in Pocatello, Idaho. The company violated the Emergency Planning and Community Right to Know Act by failing to immediately notify the Power and Bannock Counties' Local Emergency Planning Committees or the State Emergency Response Commission of the release.

In February 2004, J.R. Simplot Company agreed to pay the United States Environmental Protection Agency $525,000 and install $2 million in air pollution control equipment to resolve violations of the federal Clean Air Act at its silica sand mining facility in Overton, Nevada. The violation occurred in 1988 when the company removed equipment required by the federal Clean Air Act to control emissions of air pollutants.

In early 2012, Simplot submitted a report to the Environmental Protection Agency to explain its view regarding how and why pollution limits could be eased in phosphate mine areas, and linking to livestock die-offs of sheep and cattle in other areas.

Simplot is one of six major companies to join the Obama Administration in an effort to significantly reduce energy use over the next 10 years. The company has received awards including the Utah Board of Oil, Gas and Mining's Earth Day award for the environmental work completed in Nevada.

In June 2012, Simplot partnered with two conservation groups and three phosphate mining companies in an effort to improve the water quality of the Blackfoot River in Eastern Idaho. The parties are: J.R. Simplot Company, Monsanto and Agrium/Nu-West Industries, the Idaho Conservation League and Trout Unlimited.

More recently, Simplot settled with the U.S. Environmental Protection Agency and U.S. Department of Justice resolving alleged Clean Air Act violations related to modifications made at Simplot's five sulfuric acid plants near Lathrop, Calif., Pocatello, Idaho and Rock Springs, Wyo. Under the settlement, Simplot was required to spend an estimated $42 million to install, upgrade and operate pollution controls that significantly cut sulfur dioxide emissions at all five plants, fund a wood stove replacement project in the area surrounding the Lathrop plant, and pay an amount of $899,000 as civil penalty. The company settled with the U.S. Environmental Protection Agency and U.S. Department of Justice resolving Simplot's liability for alleged violations at the Rock Springs, Wyoming facility under the Resource Conservation and Recovery -Act (RCRA), including failure to determine if a solid waste is a hazardous waste (40 C.F.R. § 262.11); treatment, storage or disposal of hazardous waste in the phosphogypsum (gypsum) stack without a permit or interim status (42 U.S.C. § 6925(a) and 40 C.F.R. Parts 264/265 and 270); failure to perform land disposal determinations and to meet land disposal restrictions for hazardous wastes (40 C.F.R. Part 268); and failure to submit complete Emergency Planning and Community Right-to-Know Act (EPCRA) annual toxic release reports (42 U.S.C. § 11023 and the implementing regulations at 40 C.F.R. Part 372). Simplot agree to pay a civil penalty of $775,000 to resolve the alleged past violations of RCRA and EPCRA. In 2021, Simplot agreed to pay a $65,248 penalty for violations of federal pesticide handling and storage requirements at its storage and retail facilities in Umatilla, Oregon and Moreland, Idaho.

== Genetically modified potatoes ==
Simplot developed the genetically modified Innate potato, which was approved by the USDA in 2014 and the FDA in 2015. It is designed to resist blackspot bruising, browning and to contain less of the amino acid asparagine.

Asparagine can become acrylamide during the frying of potatoes and is a probable human carcinogen, so reduced levels of it are desirable. The 'Innate' name comes from the fact that this variety does not contain any genetic material from other species (the genes used are “innate” to potatoes). RNA interference is used to “switch off” genes in this case. Simplot hopes that not including genes from other species will assuage consumer fears about biotechnology.

The "Innate" potato is not a single cultivar, rather, it is a group of potato varieties that have had the same genetic alterations applied using the same process. Five different potato varieties have been transformed, thus creating "innate" versions with all of the original traits plus the engineered ones. Ranger Russet, Russet Burbank, and Atlantic potatoes have all been transformed by Simplot, as well as two proprietary varieties. Modifications of each variety involved two transformations, one for each of the two new traits.

Food and Water Watch successfully petitioned McDonald's to reject Innate potatoes.

== Relationship with farmers ==
Potato-growers in Tasmania contracted by Simplot for Australian potato products protested a 6% price cut for the 2026 season. This cut came following a demand for contracts to keep up with increased running costs, resulting in a predicted 39% drop in profits for farmers. Simplot claimed to remain competitive it would consider importing potato products, particularly from India and China, as they are much cheaper to produce in these countries. In 2024 Simplot reported a $76 million net profit from Australian operations. Negotiations resolved following a rally in Deloraine, with farmers taking a 4% cut on profits a year.

== Brands ==
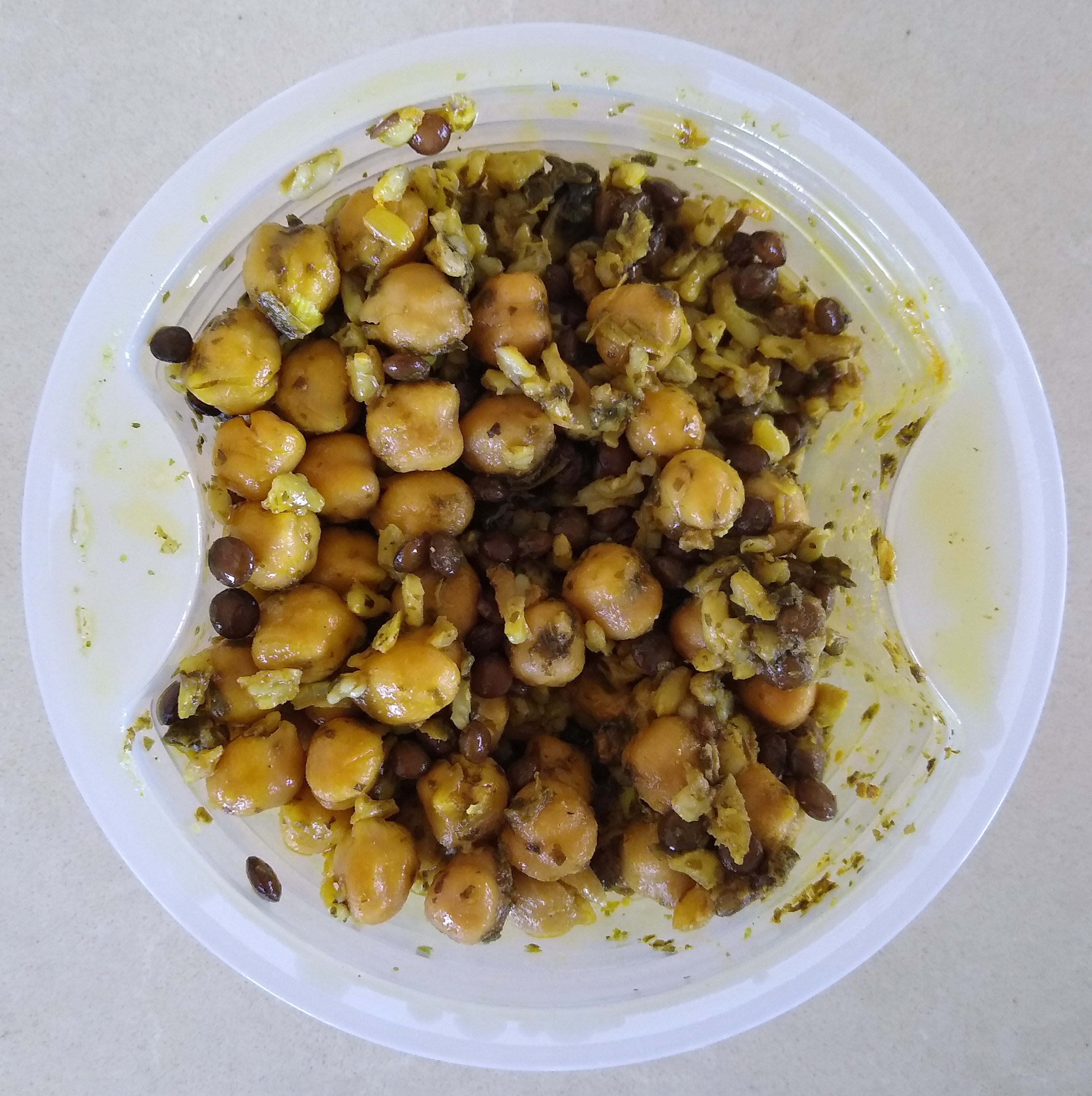
An Edgell "Nourish Bowl"

- Ally (salmon)
- Apex Products (fertilizer)
- Best Products (fertilizer)
- Bird's Eye - Australia and New Zealand (frozen fish, vegetables, potatoes, and meals)
- Chicken Tonight (Australia and New Zealand)
- Chiko Rolls
- Edgell (frozen vegetables)
- GAL-XeONE (controlled-release fertilizer)
- Harvest (heat and eat)
- I&J (frozen meats)
- Innate (potatoes)
- Jacklin Seed (grass seed)
- John West - Australia (tuna and salmon)
- Leggo's (Italian dishes)
- Raguletto (Australia and New Zealand)
- Seakist (tuna)

== See also ==
- List of companies based in Idaho
