= Malta, Idaho =

City in Cassia County, Idaho, United States

- City
- Location of Malta in Cassia County, Idaho.

- Location in Idaho Location in the United States
- Coordinates: 42°18′27″N 113°22′24″W
- Country: United States
- State: Idaho
- County: Cassia

Area
  - Total: 1.38 sq mi (3.58 km^{2})
  - Land: 1.38 sq mi (3.57 km^{2})
  - Water: 0 sq mi (0.00 km^{2})
- Elevation: 4,518 ft (1,377 m)

Population (2020)
  - Total: 167
  - Density: 121/sq mi (46.8/km^{2})
- Time zone: UTC-7 (Mountain (MST))
  - Summer (DST): UTC-6 (MDT)
- ZIP code: 83342
- Area code: 208
- FIPS code: 16-50230
- GNIS feature ID: 2410915

Malta is a city in Cassia County, Idaho, United States. The population was 167 at the 2020 census. It is part of the Burley, Idaho Micropolitan Statistical Area.

== History ==
The settlers in the Malta area in the early 1880s had no central location for mail delivery. The mail was delivered in open boxes. The Condit family secured a permit from the U.S. Post Office Department to open a post office and name the community. The post office was opened in 1883. Apparently it seemed like an island in a wide expanse of sea, so they named it Malta after the island of Malta in the Mediterranean.

A website, created as an Eagle Scout project, includes a history on the majority of the people buried at the Valley Vu Cemetery in Malta. It also has histories and information from Raft River High School, including yearbooks.

== Demographics ==
Historical population
Census	Pop.	Note	%±
1970	196		—
1980	196		0.0%
1990	171		−12.8%
2000	177		3.5%
2010	193		9.0%
2020	167		−13.5%
U.S. Decennial Census

=== 2010 census ===
As of the census of 2010, there were 193 people, 66 households, and 46 families residing in the city. The population density was 137.9 inhabitants per square mile (53.2/km^{2}). There were 74 housing units at an average density of 52.9 per square mile (20.4/km^{2}). The racial makeup of the city was 91.2% White and 8.8% from other races. Hispanic or Latino of any race were 14.5% of the population.

There were 66 households, of which 37.9% had children under the age of 18 living with them, 62.1% were married couples living together, 6.1% had a female householder with no husband present, 1.5% had a male householder with no wife present, and 30.3% were non-families. 27.3% of all households were made up of individuals, and 15.1% had someone living alone who was 65 years of age or older. The average household size was 2.92 and the average family size was 3.70.

The median age in the city was 33.2 years. 32.6% of residents were under the age of 18; 9.9% were between the ages of 18 and 24; 22.8% were from 25 to 44; 23.9% were from 45 to 64; and 10.9% were 65 years of age or older. The gender makeup of the city was 49.7% male and 50.3% female.

=== 2000 census ===
As of the census of 2000, there were 177 people, 62 households, and 49 families residing in the city. The population density was 124.5 inhabitants per square mile (48.1/km^{2}). There were 75 housing units, with an average density of 52.7 per square mile (20.3/km^{2}). The racial makeup of the city was 98.31% White, 1.13% Native American, and 0.56% from two or more races.

There were 62 households, out of which 38.7% had children under the age of 18 living with them, 74.2% were married couples living together, 4.8% had a female householder with no husband present, and 19.4% were non-families. 19.4% of all households were made up of individuals, and 12.9% had someone living alone who was 65 years of age or older. The average household size was 2.85 and the average family size was 3.30.

In the city, the population was spread out, with 33.3% under the age of 18, 8.5% from 18 to 24, 16.9% from 25 to 44, 18.6% from 45 to 64, and 22.6% who were 65 years of age or older. The median age was 36 years. For every 100 females, there were 90.3 males. For every 100 females age 18 and over, there were 87.3 males.

The median income for a household in the city was $32,292, and the median income for a family was $38,542. Males had a median income of $26,875 versus $43,125 for females. The per capita income for the city was $14,852. About 9.3% of families and 17.5% of the population were below the poverty line, including 26.8% of those under the age of eighteen and 11.8% of those sixty five or over.

== Geography ==
According to the United States Census Bureau, the city has a total area of 1.40 square miles (3.63 km^{2}), all of it land.

=== Climate ===
According to the Köppen Climate Classification system, Malta has a semi-arid climate, abbreviated "BSk" on climate maps.

Climate data for Malta, Idaho, 1991–2020 normals, extremes 1984–2018
Month	Jan	Feb	Mar	Apr	May	Jun	Jul	Aug	Sep	Oct	Nov	Dec	Year
Record high °F (°C)	63 (17)	69 (21)	78 (26)	88 (31)	93 (34)	100 (38)	105 (41)	103 (39)	97 (36)	88 (31)	73 (23)	68 (20)	105 (41)
Mean daily maximum °F (°C)	36.3 (2.4)	41.5 (5.3)	52.2 (11.2)	58.1 (14.5)	67.8 (19.9)	77.9 (25.5)	87.6 (30.9)	86.5 (30.3)	76.7 (24.8)	62.7 (17.1)	47.5 (8.6)	36.3 (2.4)	60.9 (16.1)
Daily mean °F (°C)	26.7 (−2.9)	30.9 (−0.6)	38.3 (3.5)	44.1 (6.7)	52.2 (11.2)	60.2 (15.7)	68.0 (20.0)	67.1 (19.5)	58.2 (14.6)	46.8 (8.2)	35.2 (1.8)	26.5 (−3.1)	46.2 (7.9)
Mean daily minimum °F (°C)	17.1 (−8.3)	20.3 (−6.5)	24.4 (−4.2)	30.0 (−1.1)	36.5 (2.5)	42.4 (5.8)	48.4 (9.1)	47.6 (8.7)	39.8 (4.3)	30.8 (−0.7)	23.0 (−5.0)	16.6 (−8.6)	31.4 (−0.3)
Record low °F (°C)	−25 (−32)	−19 (−28)	−12 (−24)	12 (−11)	19 (−7)	28 (−2)	33 (1)	25 (−4)	14 (−10)	4 (−16)	−12 (−24)	−18 (−28)	−25 (−32)
Average precipitation inches (mm)	0.70 (18)	0.41 (10)	0.75 (19)	1.01 (26)	1.46 (37)	0.65 (17)	0.73 (19)	0.92 (23)	0.88 (22)	0.82 (21)	0.58 (15)	0.70 (18)	9.61 (245)
Average snowfall inches (cm)	4.2 (11)	1.9 (4.8)	1.2 (3.0)	1.2 (3.0)	0.0 (0.0)	0.0 (0.0)	0.0 (0.0)	0.0 (0.0)	0.0 (0.0)	0.0 (0.0)	0.3 (0.76)	3.1 (7.9)	11.9 (30.46)
Average precipitation days (≥ 0.01 in)	7.3	4.9	5.0	6.6	7.7	4.5	4.1	4.1	3.8	4.8	5.3	6.1	64.2
Average snowy days (≥ 0.1 in)	2.4	1.1	0.6	0.3	0.0	0.0	0.0	0.0	0.0	0.0	0.4	1.2	6.0
Source 1: NOAA
Source 2: National Weather Service

== Education ==
Malta is a part of the Cassia County School District.

Zoned schools include:

- Raft River Elementary School
- Raft River Jr./Sr. High School

== See also ==
- List of cities in Idaho
