= Cassia County School District =

School district in Idaho, United States

Coordinates: 42.5065°N 113.7938°W

Cassia County School District #151

Location
- 3650 Overland Ave. Burley, ID 83318 Cassia County, Idaho United States

District information
- Type: Public
- Motto: "Supporting High Levels of Learning and Success"
- Grades: PreK-12
- Established: 1948
- Superintendent: Scott Root

Students and staff
- Students: 5,600
- Teachers: 340 Certified Staff
- Staff: 750

Other information
- Website: www.cassiaschools.org

The Cassia County Joint School District 151 is a school district located in Cassia County, Idaho. It consists of 16 schools, and is the largest employer in the county.

The majority of its territory is in Cassia County, and it covers the majority of that county. It also includes portions of Oneida and Twin Falls counties. The size of the district's territory exceeds that of Delaware.

== History ==
In 1948, Cassia County School District consolidated from 49 individually operating small districts spread throughout the county. These small districts consisted of mainly single room schoolhouses in highly rural areas, including Elba, View, Starr's Ferry, Marion, and others.

Bond proposals were put forward to voters in 2016 and 2019 to raise money for facilities maintenance and improvement. Both failed to gain the required 2/3 majority of voters' approval, and therefore failed.

The newest addition to the district is John V. Evans Elementary School, which broke ground in 2016 and opened in 2017.

Also in 2016, the District's superintendent, Gaylen Smyer, was recognized as Superintendent of the Year by the Idaho Association of School Administrators.

In response to mental health concerns from the isolation from the COVID-19 pandemic, the district has implemented a 24-hour text hotline, called School Pulse, to aid students’ mental health.

== Schools ==
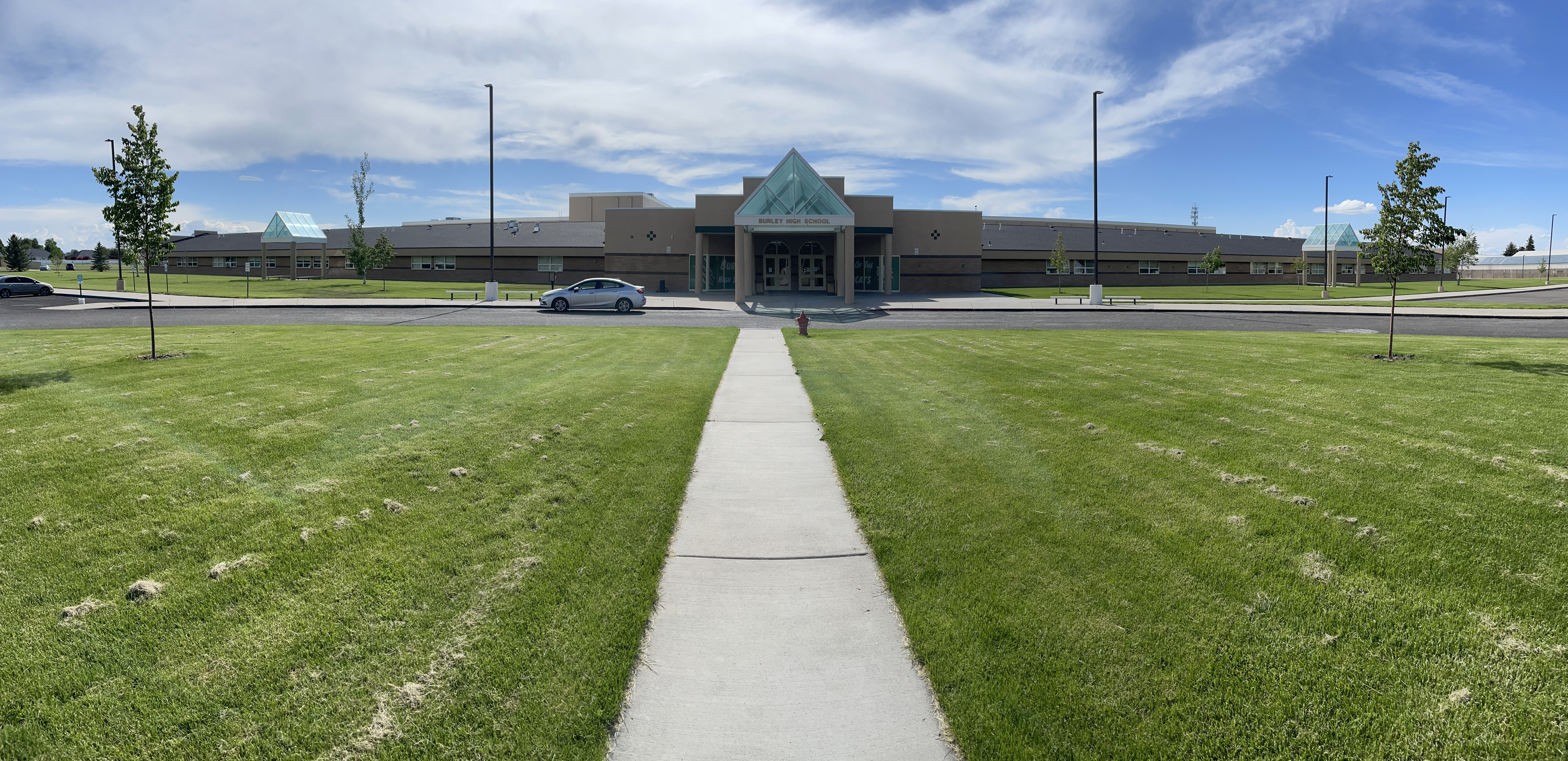
Burley High School

There are 16 schools in the Cassia County School District, as follows:

=== 7-12 schools ===
- Oakley Junior/Senior High School
- Raft River Jr./Sr. High School

=== High schools ===
- Burley High School
- Declo High School

=== Junior high schools ===
- Declo Junior High School (6–8)
- Burley Junior High School (7–8)

=== Elementary schools (PK-6) ===
- Mountain View Elementary School
- Oakley Elementary School
- Raft River Elementary School
- White Pine Elementary School

=== Elementary schools (K-6) ===
- Dworshak Elementary School
- John V. Evans Elementary School

=== Elementary schools (PK-5) ===
- Albion Elementary School
- Declo Elementary School

=== Alternative schools ===
- Cassia Junior-Senior High School (7–12)
- Cassia Regional Technical Center (9–12)
- Mini-Cassia Online Learning Academy (PK–12)
