= Cache Peak =

Mountain in the state of Idaho

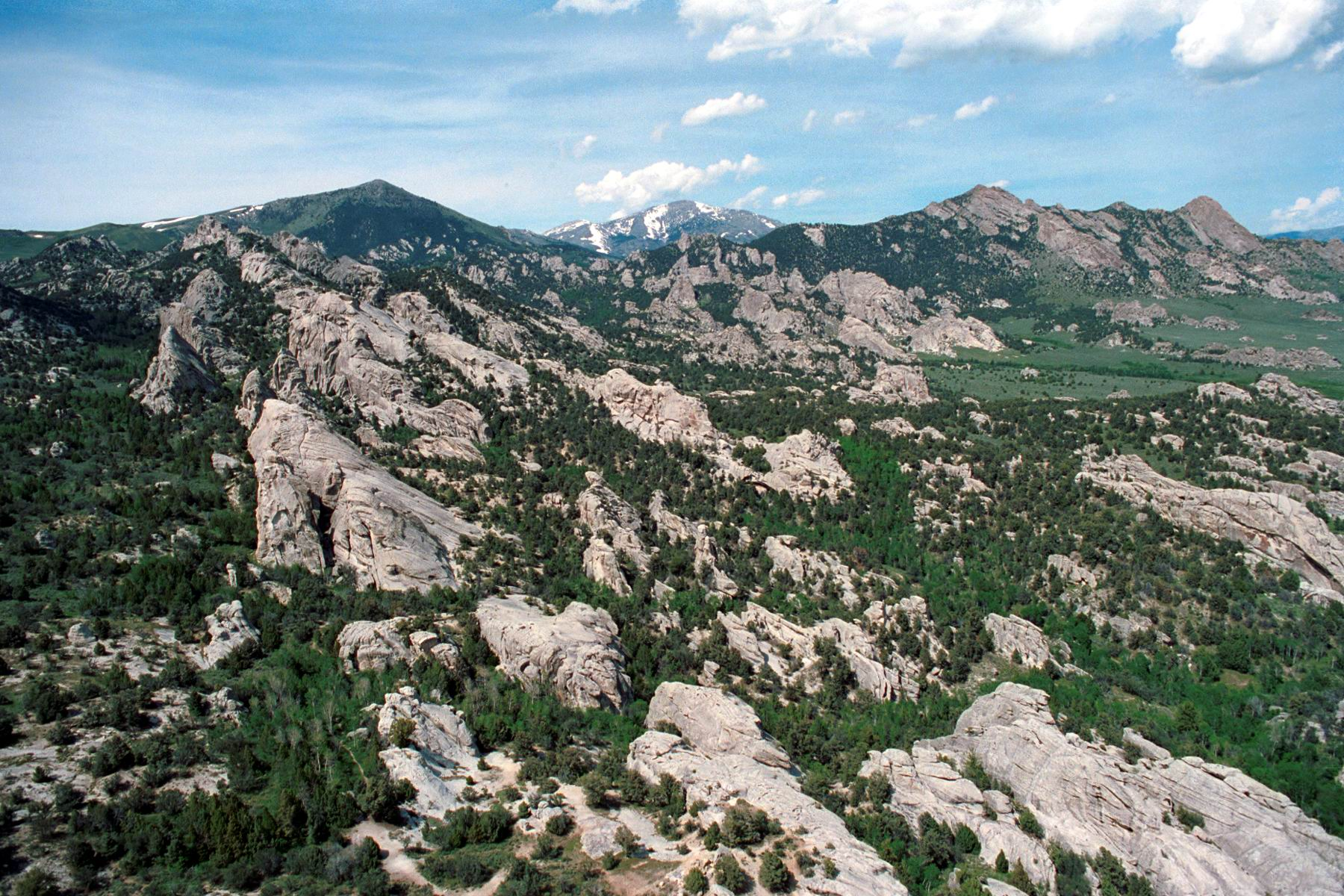
- Cache Peak at center in background and the City of Rocks National Reserve

Highest point
- Elevation: 10,339 ft (3,151 m)
- Prominence: 4,459 ft (1,359 m)
- Coordinates: 42°11′08″N 113°39′40″W

Geography
- Location within Idaho
- Location: Cassia County, Idaho, U.S.
- Parent range: Albion Mountains
- Topo map: USGS Cache Peak

Cache Peak, at 10,339 feet (3,151 m) above sea level, is the highest peak in the Albion Mountains of Cassia County in Southern Idaho and the highest peak south of the Snake River in Idaho. Cache Peak is located in the central part of the range southeast of Oakley and north of Almo in the Albion Division of the Minidoka Ranger District of Sawtooth National Forest.

Cache Peak is in the watershed of tributaries of the Snake River, which itself is a tributary of the Columbia River. The peak is a part of the Great Basin Divide and the Basin and Range Province. It is the highest peak in Idaho south of the Snake River Plain, the highest in Cassia County, and north of City of Rocks National Reserve. The Independence Lakes are located in the basin north of the peak, and Mount Independence is about 1 mi (1.6 km) northwest of the peak. The peak can be reached via a non-technical hike, and there are several alpine lakes on the east side of the peak.

Cache Peak supports one of the three populations of Cymopterus davisii, a plant that is endemic to the Albion Mountains. The Cache Peak population is considered a single population with Mount Independence.

== Climate ==
Climate data for Cache Peak 42.1855 N, 113.6581 W, Elevation: 9,869 ft (3,008 m) (1991–2020 normals)
Month	Jan	Feb	Mar	Apr	May	Jun	Jul	Aug	Sep	Oct	Nov	Dec	Year
Mean daily maximum °F (°C)	26.2 (−3.2)	26.6 (−3.0)	31.8 (−0.1)	36.4 (2.4)	46.1 (7.8)	56.9 (13.8)	68.6 (20.3)	67.7 (19.8)	58.0 (14.4)	44.1 (6.7)	32.0 (0.0)	25.4 (−3.7)	43.3 (6.3)
Daily mean °F (°C)	18.4 (−7.6)	17.9 (−7.8)	22.1 (−5.5)	26.3 (−3.2)	35.5 (1.9)	45.4 (7.4)	55.7 (13.2)	55.2 (12.9)	46.2 (7.9)	34.4 (1.3)	24.0 (−4.4)	17.9 (−7.8)	33.2 (0.7)
Mean daily minimum °F (°C)	10.7 (−11.8)	9.2 (−12.7)	12.3 (−10.9)	16.2 (−8.8)	25.0 (−3.9)	33.8 (1.0)	42.8 (6.0)	42.6 (5.9)	34.5 (1.4)	24.7 (−4.1)	16.1 (−8.8)	10.5 (−11.9)	23.2 (−4.9)
Average precipitation inches (mm)	4.86 (123)	3.80 (97)	3.83 (97)	4.27 (108)	4.15 (105)	2.15 (55)	1.12 (28)	1.17 (30)	1.71 (43)	2.71 (69)	3.20 (81)	5.51 (140)	38.48 (976)
Source: PRISM Climate Group

== See also ==
- List of mountain peaks of Idaho
- List of mountain peaks of the United States
- List of mountain peaks of North America
- List of mountains of Idaho
- List of mountain ranges in Idaho
