= Declo, Idaho =

- City
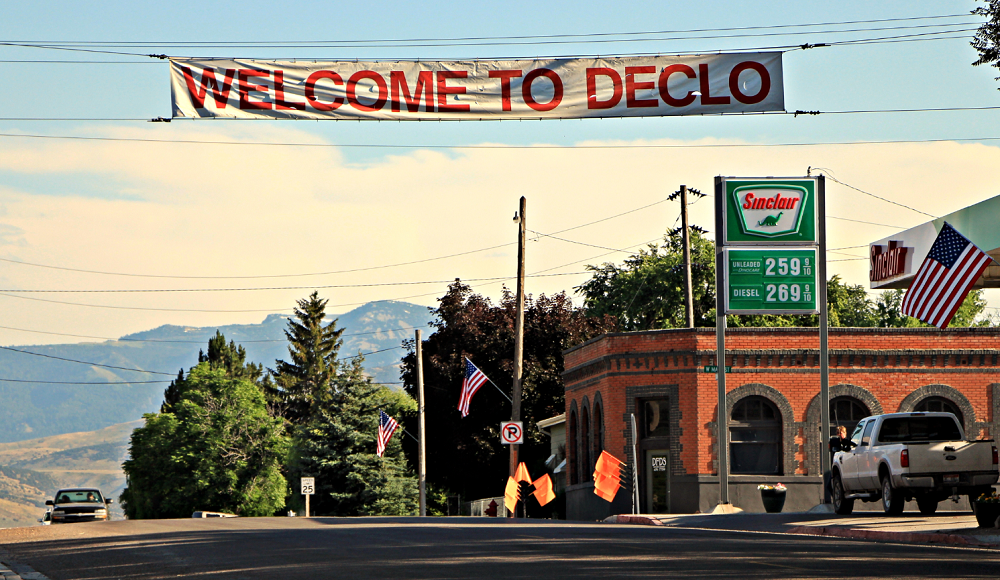

- Location of Declo in Cassia County, Idaho.

- Location in the United States
- Coordinates: 42°31′06″N 113°37′33″W
- Country: United States
- State: Idaho
- County: Cassia

Government
  - Mayor: Lance Osterhout

Area
  - Total: 0.28 sq mi (0.72 km^{2})
  - Land: 0.28 sq mi (0.72 km^{2})
  - Water: 0 sq mi (0.00 km^{2})
- Elevation: 4,213 ft (1,284 m)

Population (2020)
  - Total: 338
  - Density: 1,333.2/sq mi (514.76/km^{2})
- Time zone: UTC-7 (Mountain (MST))
  - Summer (DST): UTC-6 (MDT)
- ZIP code: 83323
- Area code: 208
- FIPS code: 16-20980
- GNIS feature ID: 2410308

Declo is a city in Cassia County, Idaho, United States. It is part of the Burley, Idaho micropolitan area. The population was 338 at the time of the 2020 Census, down from 343 in 2010.

== History ==
East of Burley and south of the nearby Snake River, the city was originally named Marshfield. In 1916, the name was changed to Declo. The Central Post Office told the community to choose another name not to exceed five letters. the surname initials of the first five men to enter the post office were recorded: August Detlef, George Eldredge, Hyrum Lewis, James Cooley, and Carl Osterhout. The Central Post Office said they preferred Declo instead of Delco, and such it was named.

The J. R. Simplot Company was founded in 1923 near Declo by 14-year-old entrepreneur J. R. Simplot, who had moved to the area with his family as a toddler. The corporate headquarters for the company are now located in Boise.

== Geography ==
According to the United States Census Bureau, the city has a total area of 0.28 square miles (0.73 km^{2}), all of it land.

The Hillside Letter "D" can be seen in the southeast (42.2847°N 113.3439°W)

=== Climate ===
According to the Köppen Climate Classification system, Declo has a semi-arid climate, abbreviated "BSk" on climate maps.

== Demographics ==
Historical population
Census	Pop.	Note	%±
1920	22		—
1930	196		790.9%
1940	238		21.4%
1950	219		−8.0%
1960	237		8.2%
1970	251		5.9%
1980	276		10.0%
1990	279		1.1%
2000	338		21.1%
2010	343		1.5%
2020	338		−1.5%
U.S. Decennial Census

=== 2010 census ===
As of the census of 2010, there were 343 people, 115 households, and 87 families residing in the city. The population density was 1,225.0 inhabitants per square mile (473.0/km^{2}). There were 127 housing units at an average density of 453.6 per square mile (175.1/km^{2}). The racial makeup of the city was 85.1% White, 4.1% Native American, 9.9% from other races, and 0.9% from two or more races. Hispanic or Latino of any race were 15.2% of the population.

There were 115 households, of which 45.2% had children under the age of 18 living with them, 51.3% were married couples living together, 15.7% had a female householder with no husband present, 8.7% had a male householder with no wife present, and 24.3% were non-families. 21.7% of all households were made up of individuals, and 9.6% had someone living alone who was 65 years of age or older. The average household size was 2.98 and the average family size was 3.44.

The median age in the city was 29.8 years. 35.6% of residents were under the age of 18; 8.7% were between the ages of 18 and 24; 22.3% were from 25 to 44; 22.4% were from 45 to 64; and 10.8% were 65 years of age or older. The gender makeup of the city was 50.1% male and 49.9% female.

=== 2000 census ===
As of the census of 2000, there were 338 people, 103 households, and 87 families residing in the city. The population density was 1,226.7 inhabitants per square mile (473.6/km^{2}). There were 113 housing units at an average density of 410.1 per square mile (158.3/km^{2}). The racial makeup of the city was 75.44% White, 0.59% African American, 0.30% Native American, 23.37% from other races, and 0.30% from two or more races. Hispanic or Latino of any race were 27.22% of the population.

There were 103 households, out of which 48.5% had children under the age of 18 living with them, 66.0% were married couples living together, 14.6% had a female householder with no husband present, and 14.6% were non-families. 10.7% of all households were made up of individuals, and 2.9% had someone living alone who was 65 years of age or older. The average household size was 3.28 and the average family size was 3.57.

In the city, the population was spread out, with 38.5% under the age of 18, 8.3% from 18 to 24, 26.6% from 25 to 44, 16.9% from 45 to 64, and 9.8% who were 65 years of age or older. The median age was 27 years. For every 100 females, there were 98.8 males. For every 100 females age 18 and over, there were 110.1 males.

The median income for a household in the city was $36,528, and the median income for a family was $39,286. Males had a median income of $32,083 versus $18,750 for females. The per capita income for the city was $12,884. About 9.4% of families and 9.5% of the population were below the poverty line, including 9.0% of those under age 18 and none of those age 65 or over.

== Education ==
Declo is part of the Cassia County School District.

The following schools are located in Declo:

- Declo Elementary School
- Declo Junior High School
- Declo High School

== Notable people ==
- Kelly Anthon, current President Pro Tempore of the Idaho Senate (former Majority Leader of the Idaho Senate)
- J. R. Simplot, founder of the J. R. Simplot Company
