= Oakley, Idaho =

- City
- Location of Oakley in Cassia County, Idaho.

- Location in the United States
- Coordinates: 42°14′42″N 113°52′51″W
- Country: United States
- State: Idaho
- County: Cassia
- Oakley Village: 1878

Government
  - Mayor: Larry Mickelsen

Area
  - Total: 4.63 sq mi (11.98 km^{2})
  - Land: 4.62 sq mi (11.97 km^{2})
  - Water: 0 sq mi (0.00 km^{2})
- Elevation: 4,574 ft (1,394 m)

Population (2020)
  - Total: 786
  - Density: 170/sq mi (65.7/km^{2})
- Time zone: UTC-7 (Mountain (MST))
  - Summer (DST): UTC-6 (MDT)
- ZIP code: 83346
- Area code: 208
- FIPS code: 16-58330
- GNIS feature ID: 2411295
- Website: oakleyidaho.org

Oakley is a city in Cassia County, Idaho, United States. The population was 786 at the 2020 census, up from 763 in 2010. It is part of the Burley Micropolitan Statistical Area.

== History ==
The city was named for William Oakley, the proprietor of a 19th-century stagecoach station located at a spring currently located about 2 miles (3.2 km) west of the present townsite known as Oakley Meadows.

Oakley Academy was established in 1901, and Howells Opera House was established in 1907.

== Geography ==
Oakley is located at the very southern limit of the Snake River Plain, and close to Goose Creek, between the Middle and Albion Mountains.

According to the United States Census Bureau, the city has a total area of 4.59 square miles (11.89 km^{2}), all of it land.

=== Climate ===
According to the Köppen Climate Classification system, Oakley has a cold semi-arid climate, abbreviated "BSk" on climate maps. The hottest temperature recorded in Oakley was 108 °F (42.2 °C) on July 21–22, 1893, while the coldest temperature recorded was −27 °F (−32.8 °C) on February 9, 1933.

Climate data for Oakley, Idaho, 1991–2020 normals, extremes 1893–present
Month	Jan	Feb	Mar	Apr	May	Jun	Jul	Aug	Sep	Oct	Nov	Dec	Year
Record high °F (°C)	64 (18)	70 (21)	77 (25)	90 (32)	98 (37)	104 (40)	108 (42)	107 (42)	101 (38)	91 (33)	77 (25)	73 (23)	108 (42)
Mean maximum °F (°C)	52.1 (11.2)	57.4 (14.1)	69.1 (20.6)	76.9 (24.9)	83.4 (28.6)	90.7 (32.6)	96.1 (35.6)	94.2 (34.6)	89.2 (31.8)	79.5 (26.4)	66.1 (18.9)	54.1 (12.3)	96.7 (35.9)
Mean daily maximum °F (°C)	39.9 (4.4)	44.5 (6.9)	54.0 (12.2)	60.3 (15.7)	68.8 (20.4)	77.6 (25.3)	86.4 (30.2)	85.6 (29.8)	76.8 (24.9)	63.9 (17.7)	49.5 (9.7)	39.0 (3.9)	62.2 (16.8)
Daily mean °F (°C)	30.6 (−0.8)	34.3 (1.3)	41.8 (5.4)	47.2 (8.4)	55.1 (12.8)	63.0 (17.2)	71.5 (21.9)	70.5 (21.4)	61.9 (16.6)	50.5 (10.3)	38.6 (3.7)	30.1 (−1.1)	49.6 (9.8)
Mean daily minimum °F (°C)	21.4 (−5.9)	24.2 (−4.3)	29.6 (−1.3)	34.0 (1.1)	41.5 (5.3)	48.4 (9.1)	56.6 (13.7)	55.5 (13.1)	47.1 (8.4)	37.1 (2.8)	27.7 (−2.4)	21.1 (−6.1)	37.0 (2.8)
Mean minimum °F (°C)	1.7 (−16.8)	7.2 (−13.8)	14.8 (−9.6)	21.1 (−6.1)	28.4 (−2.0)	35.8 (2.1)	46.1 (7.8)	44.0 (6.7)	33.1 (0.6)	20.9 (−6.2)	9.5 (−12.5)	2.7 (−16.3)	−3.7 (−19.8)
Record low °F (°C)	−25 (−32)	−27 (−33)	−2 (−19)	2 (−17)	17 (−8)	24 (−4)	31 (−1)	30 (−1)	17 (−8)	7 (−14)	−14 (−26)	−26 (−32)	−27 (−33)
Average precipitation inches (mm)	0.82 (21)	0.69 (18)	1.14 (29)	1.55 (39)	2.05 (52)	1.12 (28)	0.69 (18)	0.72 (18)	1.08 (27)	0.88 (22)	0.78 (20)	0.79 (20)	12.31 (312)
Average snowfall inches (cm)	5.7 (14)	5.0 (13)	4.2 (11)	2.0 (5.1)	0.2 (0.51)	0.0 (0.0)	0.0 (0.0)	0.0 (0.0)	0.0 (0.0)	0.6 (1.5)	2.2 (5.6)	5.2 (13)	25.1 (63.71)
Average precipitation days (≥ 0.01 in)	6.6	5.8	7.4	8.2	9.7	6.1	3.9	4.0	3.6	5.3	5.7	6.0	72.3
Average snowy days (≥ 0.1 in)	3.3	2.3	1.7	0.7	0.1	0.0	0.0	0.0	0.0	0.2	1.4	2.9	12.6
Source 1: NOAA
Source 2: National Weather Service

== Demographics ==
Historical population
Census	Pop.	Note	%±
1910	911		—
1920	1,273		39.7%
1930	882		−30.7%
1940	813		−7.8%
1950	684		−15.9%
1960	613		−10.4%
1970	656		7.0%
1980	663		1.1%
1990	635		−4.2%
2000	668		5.2%
2010	763		14.2%
2020	786		3.0%
U.S. Decennial Census

=== 2010 census ===
As of the census of 2010, there were 763 people, 248 households, and 192 families residing in the city. The population density was 166.2 inhabitants per square mile (64.2/km^{2}). There were 280 housing units at an average density of 61.0 per square mile (23.6/km^{2}). The racial makeup of the city was 92.5% White, 0.1% Native American, 0.3% Asian, 6.6% from other races, and 0.5% from two or more races. Hispanic or Latino of any race were 9.4% of the population.

There were 248 households, of which 37.9% had children under the age of 18 living with them, 67.3% were married couples living together, 8.5% had a female householder with no husband present, 1.6% had a male householder with no wife present, and 22.6% were non-families. 21.4% of all households were made up of individuals, and 11.3% had someone living alone who was 65 years of age or older. The average household size was 3.08 and the average family size was 3.60.

The median age in the city was 34.6 years. 35.8% of residents were under the age of 18; 5% were between the ages of 18 and 24; 22.1% were from 25 to 44; 20.8% were from 45 to 64; and 16.4% were 65 years of age or older. The gender makeup of the city was 49.9% male and 50.1% female.

=== 2000 census ===
As of the census of 2000, there were 668 people, 226 households, and 166 families residing in the city. The population density was 167.4 inhabitants per square mile (64.6/km^{2}). There were 257 housing units at an average density of 64.4 per square mile (24.9/km^{2}). The racial makeup of the city was 96.41% White, 0.15% Asian, 3.14% from other races, and 0.30% from two or more races. Hispanic or Latino of any race were 4.19% of the population.

There were 226 households, out of which 39.8% had children under the age of 18 living with them, 62.4% were married couples living together, 7.5% had a female householder with no husband present, and 26.5% were non-families. 26.1% of all households were made up of individuals, and 16.8% had someone living alone who was 65 years of age or older. The average household size was 2.93 and the average family size was 3.60.

In the city, the population was spread out, with 33.8% under the age of 18, 7.6% from 18 to 24, 20.5% from 25 to 44, 21.9% from 45 to 64, and 16.2% who were 65 years of age or older. The median age was 36 years. For every 100 females, there were 95.9 males. For every 100 females age 18 and over, there were 93.0 males.

The median income for a household in the city was $29,643, and the median income for a family was $34,792. Males had a median income of $27,083 versus $16,667 for females. The per capita income for the city was $13,983. About 9.1% of families and 14.7% of the population were below the poverty line, including 27.2% of those under age 18 and 4.8% of those age 65 or over.

== Economy ==
Oakley Stone is a type of building stone quarried south of Oakley.

== Arts and culture ==
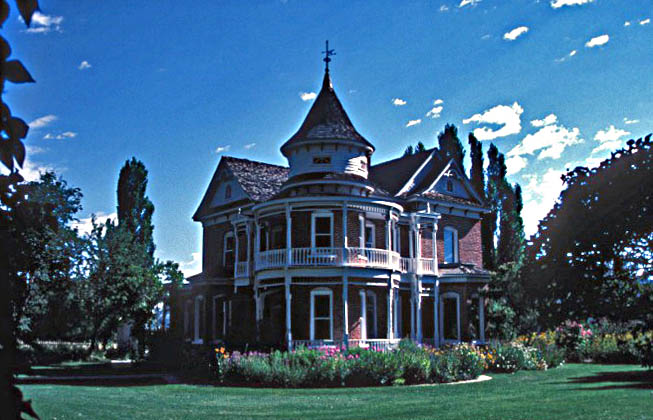
Victorian house in Oakley Historic District

Oakley Pioneer Days is an annual even celebrating "the settling of the west". The event has included a rodeo, a pony express race, food vendors, and sporting events.

Oakley is notable for its historic Victorian homes.

The Oakley Historic District is listed on the National Register of Historic Places. The entire town is listed due to the number of stone and brick buildings that are over a century old.

Oakley Valley Historical Museum chronicles the history of Oakley and the surrounding area.

The Oakley Free Library was established in 1973.

== Education ==
Oakley is in the Cassia County School District. Schools located in Oakley include Oakley Elementary School and Oakley Junior/Senior High School.

== Notable people ==
- Scott Bedke, Incumbent Lieutenant Governor of Idaho
- Debbie Critchfield, politician.
- David B. Haight, former member of the Quorum of the Twelve Apostles, of the LDS Church

== See also ==
- Castle Rocks State Park
- City of Rocks National Reserve
