= Cassia County, Idaho =

County in Idaho, United States

- County
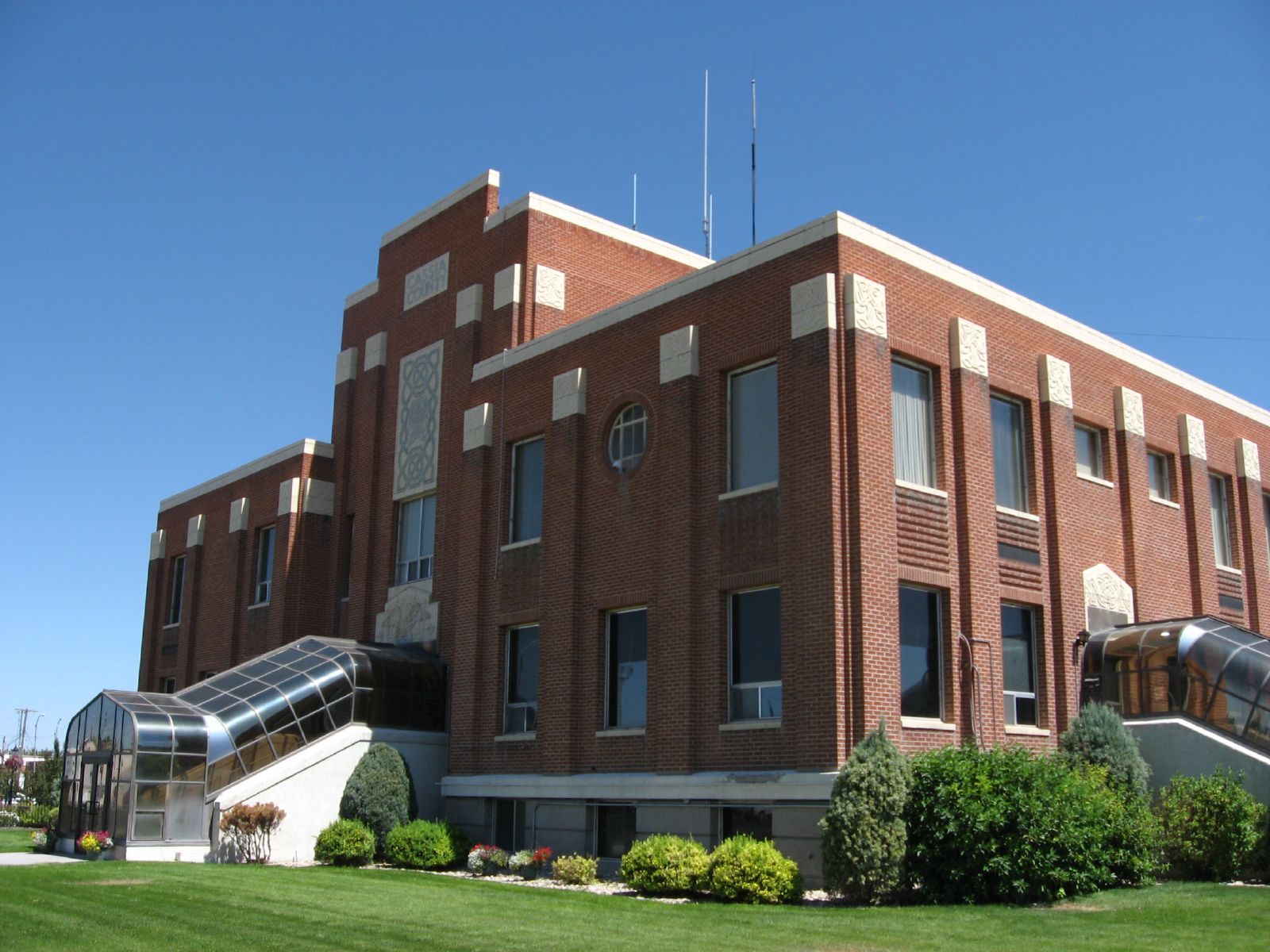
- Cassia County Courthouse

- Seal

- Location within the U.S. state of Idaho
- Coordinates: 42°16′N 113°37′W
- Country: United States
- State: Idaho
- Founded: February 20, 1879
- Named for: Cassia Creek
- Seat: Burley
- Largest city: Burley

Area
  - Total: 2,580 sq mi (6,700 km^{2})
  - Land: 2,565 sq mi (6,640 km^{2})
  - Water: 15 sq mi (39 km^{2}) 0.6%

Population (2020)
  - Total: 24,655
  - Estimate (2025): 26,397 ▲
  - Density: 9.6/sq mi (3.7/km^{2})
- Time zone: UTC−7 (Mountain)
  - Summer (DST): UTC−6 (MDT)
- Congressional district: 2nd
- Website: www.cassia.gov

Cassia County is a county in the U.S. state of Idaho. As of the 2020 Census the county had a population of 24,655. The county seat and largest city is Burley. Cassia County is included in the Burley, ID Micropolitan Statistical Area.

== History ==
The first Europeans explored the Milner area in Cassia County in 1811. It was trappers who initially developed the Oregon Trail, which ran on the county's northern border. The Raft River's junction with the Oregon Trail marked the split for the California Trail.

While the Oregon and California trails brought hundreds of thousands of emigrants through Cassia County, it also brought settlers. A stage line through the county was established between Kelton, Utah and Boise, Idaho in 1869. A stage station existed at City of Rocks. Additional stations were spaced at increments of 10–12 miles between stations to include one at Oakley Meadows, in the Goose Creek valley two miles west of the present settlement of Oakley.

William Oakley settled at the Oakley Meadows station in 1870. Cattle operations also developed starting in 1872. Settlement began at nearby Albion in 1873 with significant Mormon settlement in 1875. By 1880, Albion had a population of 257. Mormon settlement at Oakley also began on June 1, 1878, when four Mormon men each staked out 160 acres for their settlement. Settlements remained primarily agricultural with more than 38,000 head of cattle in the area by 1885. Settlement at Malta occurred prior to 1890, as the Malta precinct had 172 residents at the 1890 census.

Albion State Normal School was established at Albion in 1893. The school was focused on training Idaho teachers until 1951 when its programs were transferred to Idaho State College (now Idaho State University) in Pocatello.

D.L. Evans Bank was established in Albion, ID in 1094 and continues to serve communities Cassia County today.

Burley was platted and settled in 1905 after a branch of the Oregon Shortline was constructed through the town. Declo was settled under the name of Marshfield by 1909.

Cassia County was created from Owyhee County on February 20, 1879, with Albion becoming the county seat. A western portion became Twin Falls County in 1907. The county assumed its present boundaries when an eastern portion became Power County on January 30, 1913. The county seat was moved to Burley in 1918. The county was named for Cassia Creek, which in turn was named either for John Cazier, a member of the Mormon Battalion and an emigrant train captain, or for a plant found in the area.

== Government ==
=== Elected Officials ===
Similar to other Idaho counties, an elected three-member county commission heads the county government. Other elected officials include clerk, treasurer, sheriff, assessor, coroner, and prosecutor.

County Commission

- District 1: Leonard Beck (chair)
- District 2: Robert Kunau
- District 3: Kent Searle

Other Elected Officials

- Clerk: Joseph Larsen
- Treasurer: Laura Greener
- Sheriff: Jarod Thompson
- Assessor: Martin Adams
- Coroner: Craig Rinehart
- Prosecuting Attorney: McCord Larsen

Cassia County is in Idaho's 2nd congressional district and represented by Congressman Mike Simpson. At the state level, Cassia County is in Legislative District 27, represented by Senator Kelly Anthon of Declo, Douglas Pickett of Oakley and Clay Handy of Burley.

=== Politics ===
At every level, Cassia County is a Republican Party stronghold. All county-level offices are held by Republicans and have been for decades. Republican primaries are tantamount to election to office, as Democrats rarely field challenges for county or state legislative office. Cassia County is one of the most consistently Republican counties in the state, and in the gubernatorial election of 2010 Republican Butch Otter carried Cassia County with 76.54% to Democrat Keith Allred's 16.73%. In the presidential election of 2012, Mitt Romney, whose father lived for a few years in his youth in Oakley, carried Cassia County with 85.2% while Barack Obama received 13.1%. The last Democratic presidential candidate to carry Cassia County was Franklin Roosevelt in the election of 1940 edging out Wendell Willkie by around 100 votes.

State legislators from Cassia County traditionally hold their seats for long periods of time. Two of the longest serving legislators in Idaho history were from Cassia County: Vard Chatburn of Albion who served in the House of Representatives from 1957 to 1986 and Denton Darrington in the Senate who served from 1982 to 2012. Because legislators rarely lose their seats, legislators representing Cassia County are often in leadership or chair committees. From 2012 to 2023, Representative Scott Bedke served as Speaker of the House. Bruce Newcomb of Burley also served as Speaker from 1998 to 2006.

Though born in Burley, Congressman Simpson now lives in Idaho Falls. The only other member of congress with ties to the county is Henry Dworshak who represented Idaho's 2nd congressional district and later served in the Senate. He lived in Burley and was the publisher of the Burley Bulletin. A Burley elementary school is named after him.

United States presidential election results for Cassia County, Idaho
Year	Republican		Democratic		Third party(ies)	
Year	No.	%	No.	%	No.	%
1892	121	39.16%	0	0.00%	188	60.84%
1896	129	18.14%	579	81.43%	3	0.42%
1900	674	51.93%	624	48.07%	0	0.00%
1904	1,185	73.88%	346	21.57%	73	4.55%
1908	1,049	58.87%	600	33.67%	133	7.46%
1912	1,489	46.66%	846	26.51%	856	26.83%
1916	1,320	40.55%	1,629	50.05%	306	9.40%
1920	2,690	69.54%	1,178	30.46%	0	0.00%
1924	2,031	52.01%	1,336	34.21%	538	13.78%
1928	2,388	70.19%	994	29.22%	20	0.59%
1932	2,032	43.48%	2,598	55.60%	43	0.92%
1936	1,629	33.96%	3,100	64.62%	68	1.42%
1940	2,748	48.30%	2,930	51.50%	11	0.19%
1944	2,563	52.35%	2,325	47.49%	8	0.16%
1948	2,424	51.89%	2,178	46.63%	69	1.48%
1952	4,481	72.76%	1,676	27.21%	2	0.03%
1956	3,944	68.79%	1,789	31.21%	0	0.00%
1960	4,297	63.73%	2,445	36.27%	0	0.00%
1964	4,009	60.59%	2,608	39.41%	0	0.00%
1968	4,187	64.17%	1,350	20.69%	988	15.14%
1972	4,576	74.26%	1,080	17.53%	506	8.21%
1976	4,575	66.38%	1,881	27.29%	436	6.33%
1980	6,511	78.84%	1,369	16.58%	379	4.59%
1984	6,503	85.60%	1,036	13.64%	58	0.76%
1988	5,345	73.34%	1,833	25.15%	110	1.51%
1992	4,052	53.16%	1,351	17.73%	2,219	29.11%
1996	4,663	63.65%	1,596	21.79%	1,067	14.56%
2000	5,983	82.20%	1,087	14.93%	209	2.87%
2004	6,562	83.90%	1,153	14.74%	106	1.36%
2008	6,309	79.93%	1,332	16.88%	252	3.19%
2012	7,154	84.84%	1,098	13.02%	180	2.13%
2016	5,949	72.74%	1,036	12.67%	1,193	14.59%
2020	7,907	82.09%	1,464	15.20%	261	2.71%
2024	7,959	82.98%	1,359	14.17%	274	2.86%

== Geography ==
According to the U.S. Census Bureau, the county has a total area of 2,580 square miles (6,700 km^{2}), of which 2,565 square miles (6,640 km^{2}) is land and 15 square miles (39 km^{2}) (0.6%) is water. The county's highest point is Cache Peak at an elevation of 10,339 feet (3,151 m) above sea level in the Albion Mountains, and the lowest is Milner Lake, a reservoir on the Snake River, at 4,134 feet (1,260 m).

The northern half of the county is part of the Magic Valley region of the Snake River Plain, and numerous mountain ranges extend north from the southern boundary and diminish as they approach the river, which flows from east to west.

The Silent City of Rocks National Reserve, containing exposed granitic batholith as old as 2.5 billion years, is located in the southern part of the county.

=== Adjacent counties ===
- Minidoka County - north
- Blaine County - north
- Power County - northeast
- Oneida County - east
- Box Elder County, Utah - southeast
- Elko County, Nevada - southwest/Pacific Time Border
- Twin Falls County - west
- Jerome County - northwest

=== Highways ===
- Interstate 84
- Interstate 86
- US 30
- SH-27
- SH-77
- SH-81

=== National protected areas ===
- City of Rocks National Reserve
- Minidoka National Wildlife Refuge (part)
- Sawtooth National Forest (part)

== Demographics ==
Historical population
Census	Pop.	Note	%±
1880	1,312		—
1890	3,143		139.6%
1900	3,951		25.7%
1910	7,197		82.2%
1920	15,659		117.6%
1930	13,116		−16.2%
1940	14,430		10.0%
1950	14,629		1.4%
1960	16,121		10.2%
1970	17,017		5.6%
1980	19,427		14.2%
1990	19,532		0.5%
2000	21,416		9.6%
2010	22,952		7.2%
2020	24,655		7.4%
2025 (est.)	26,397	▲	7.1%
U.S. Decennial Census; 1790–1960, 1900–1990, 1990–2000, 2010–2020 2020

=== Racial and ethnic composition ===
Cassia County, Idaho – Racial and ethnic composition Note: the US Census treats Hispanic/Latino as an ethnic category. This table excludes Latinos from the racial categories and assigns them to a separate category. Hispanics/Latinos may be of any race.
Race / Ethnicity (NH = Non-Hispanic)	Pop 1980	Pop 1990	Pop 2000	Pop 2010	Pop 2020	% 1980	% 1990	% 2000	% 2010	% 2020
White alone (NH)	17,442	16,659	16,982	16,742	16,522	89.78%	85.29%	79.30%	72.94%	67.01%
Black or African American alone (NH)	3	3	16	38	64	0.02%	0.02%	0.07%	0.17%	0.26%
Native American or Alaska Native alone (NH)	109	136	120	106	122	0.56%	0.70%	0.56%	0.46%	0.49%
Asian alone (NH)	60	94	79	104	131	0.31%	0.48%	0.37%	0.45%	0.53%
Native Hawaiian or Pacific Islander alone (NH)	x	x	9	15	29	x	x	0.04%	0.07%	0.12%
Other race alone (NH)	30	17	12	18	80	0.15%	0.09%	0.06%	0.08%	0.32%
Mixed race or Multiracial (NH)	x	x	185	205	521	x	x	0.86%	0.89%	2.11%
Hispanic or Latino (any race)	1,783	2,623	4,013	5,724	7,186	9.18%	13.43%	18.74%	24.94%	29.15%
Total	19,427	19,532	21,416	22,952	24,655	100.00%	100.00%	100.00%	100.00%	100.00%

=== 2020 census ===
As of the 2020 census, the county had a population of 24,655. The median age was 33.1 years. 31.1% of residents were under the age of 18 and 15.2% of residents were 65 years of age or older. For every 100 females there were 104.1 males, and for every 100 females age 18 and over there were 103.2 males age 18 and over.

The racial makeup of the county was 72.2% White, 0.3% Black or African American, 1.0% American Indian and Alaska Native, 0.5% Asian, 0.1% Native Hawaiian and Pacific Islander, 17.3% from some other race, and 8.5% from two or more races. Hispanic or Latino residents of any race comprised 29.1% of the population.

49.7% of residents lived in urban areas, while 50.3% lived in rural areas.

There were 8,216 households in the county, of which 39.8% had children under the age of 18 living with them and 20.3% had a female householder with no spouse or partner present. About 21.3% of all households were made up of individuals and 10.0% had someone living alone who was 65 years of age or older.

There were 8,838 housing units, of which 7.0% were vacant. Among occupied housing units, 67.4% were owner-occupied and 32.6% were renter-occupied. The homeowner vacancy rate was 0.9% and the rental vacancy rate was 5.4%.

=== 2010 census ===
As of the 2010 United States census, there were 22,952 people, 7,666 households, and 5,758 families living in the county. The population density was 8.9 inhabitants per square mile (3.4/km^{2}). There were 8,372 housing units at an average density of 3.3 units per square mile (1.3 units/km^{2}). The racial makeup of the county was 81.8% white, 0.8% American Indian, 0.5% Asian, 0.3% black or African American, 0.1% Pacific islander, 14.2% from other races, and 2.3% from two or more races. Those of Hispanic or Latino origin made up 24.9% of the population. In terms of ancestry, 22.3% were English, 11.8% were German, 10.6% were American, and 5.1% were Irish.

Of the 7,666 households, 41.9% had children under the age of 18 living with them, 60.8% were married couples living together, 9.1% had a female householder with no husband present, 24.9% were non-families, and 21.5% of all households were made up of individuals. The average household size was 2.96 and the average family size was 3.46. The median age was 32.0 years.

The median income for a household in the county was $39,866 and the median income for a family was $47,995. Males had a median income of $36,402 versus $22,156 for females. The per capita income for the county was $17,782. About 12.4% of families and 15.4% of the population were below the poverty line, including 18.7% of those under age 18 and 8.1% of those age 65 or over.

== Education ==
Cassia County is served primarily by one school district, Cassia County School District, which was consolidated in the 1950s. Other portions are in:

- American Falls Joint School District 381
- Minidoka County School District
- Murtaugh Joint School District 418

The county is in the catchment area, but not the taxation zone, for College of Southern Idaho.

=== Schools Located in Cassia County ===
High Schools

- Burley High School in Burley
- Cassia Alternative High School in Burley
- Declo High School in Declo
- Oakley High School in Oakley
- Raft River Jr./Sr. High School in Malta

Jr. High Schools

- Burley Jr. High School in Burley
- Declo Jr. High School in Declo
- Oakley Jr. High School in Oakley
- Raft River Jr./Sr. High School in Malta

Elementary Schools

- Albion Elementary School in Albion
- Almo Elementary School in Almo
- Declo Elementary in Declo
- Dworshak Elementary School in Burley
- Evans Elementary School in Burley
- Mountain View Elementary School in Burley
- Raft River Elementary School in Malta
- White Pine Elementary School in Burley

== Communities ==
=== Cities ===
- Albion
- Burley
- Declo
- Malta
- Oakley

=== Unincorporated communities ===
- Almo
- Artesian City
- Basin
- Beetville
- Bridge
- Connor
- Elba
- Golden Valley
- Hobson
- Idahome
- Jackson (Extends into) Minidoka County
- Kenyon
- Marion
- Milner Dam (Extends into) Jerome County and Twin Falls County
- Pella
- Ruby
- Springdale
- Sublett
- Trout
- Unity
- View

== See also ==
- National Register of Historic Places listings in Cassia County, Idaho
- USS Cassia County (LST-527) - U.S. Navy ship - 1944–56
- County Parcel Map
