= Magic Mountain =

Magic Mountain or The Magic Mountain may refer to:

== Books ==
- The Magic Mountain, a novel by Thomas Mann

== Places ==
- Magic Mountain (California), a landform that was Nike missile location LA-98R
- Magic Mountain (British Columbia), a hydrothermal vent field on the Pacific Ocean sea floor
- Magic Mountain site, a prehistoric archaeological site in Colorado
- Magic Mountain (Washington), a mountain on the border of North Cascades National Park and Snoqualmie National Forest, Washington, USA

=== Ski areas ===
- Magic Mountain Resort, a small ski area south of Twin Falls, Idaho
- Magic Mountain Ski Area, a natural ski area in Londonderry, Vermont

=== Amusement parks ===
- Magic Mountain (roller coaster), a steel roller coaster in Castelnuovo del Garda, Italy
- Magic Mountain, Glenelg, a former theme park in Glenelg, Australia
- Magic Mountain, Merimbula, a theme park in Australia
- Magic Mountain (New Brunswick), a water park in Moncton, New Brunswick
- Magic Mountain, Nobby Beach, a former theme park on the Gold Coast, Australia
- Six Flags Magic Mountain, a theme park in Valencia, California

== Film and TV ==
- The Magic Mountain (1982 film), a film directed by Hans W. Geißendörfer
- The Magic Mountain (2015 film), a film directed by Anca Damian
- Magic Mountain (TV series), an Australian and Chinese children's programme

== Music ==
- "Magic Mountain" (song), by Eric Burdon & War (1977)
- Magic Mountain (Hans Koller album) (1997)
- Magic Mountain (Black Stone Cherry album) (2014)
- "Magic Mountain", a song by Blonde Redhead from Misery Is a Butterfly (2004)
- "Magic Mountain", a song by the Drums from Encyclopedia (2014)
