= Beaver Creek Fire =

2013 wildfire in Idaho, USA

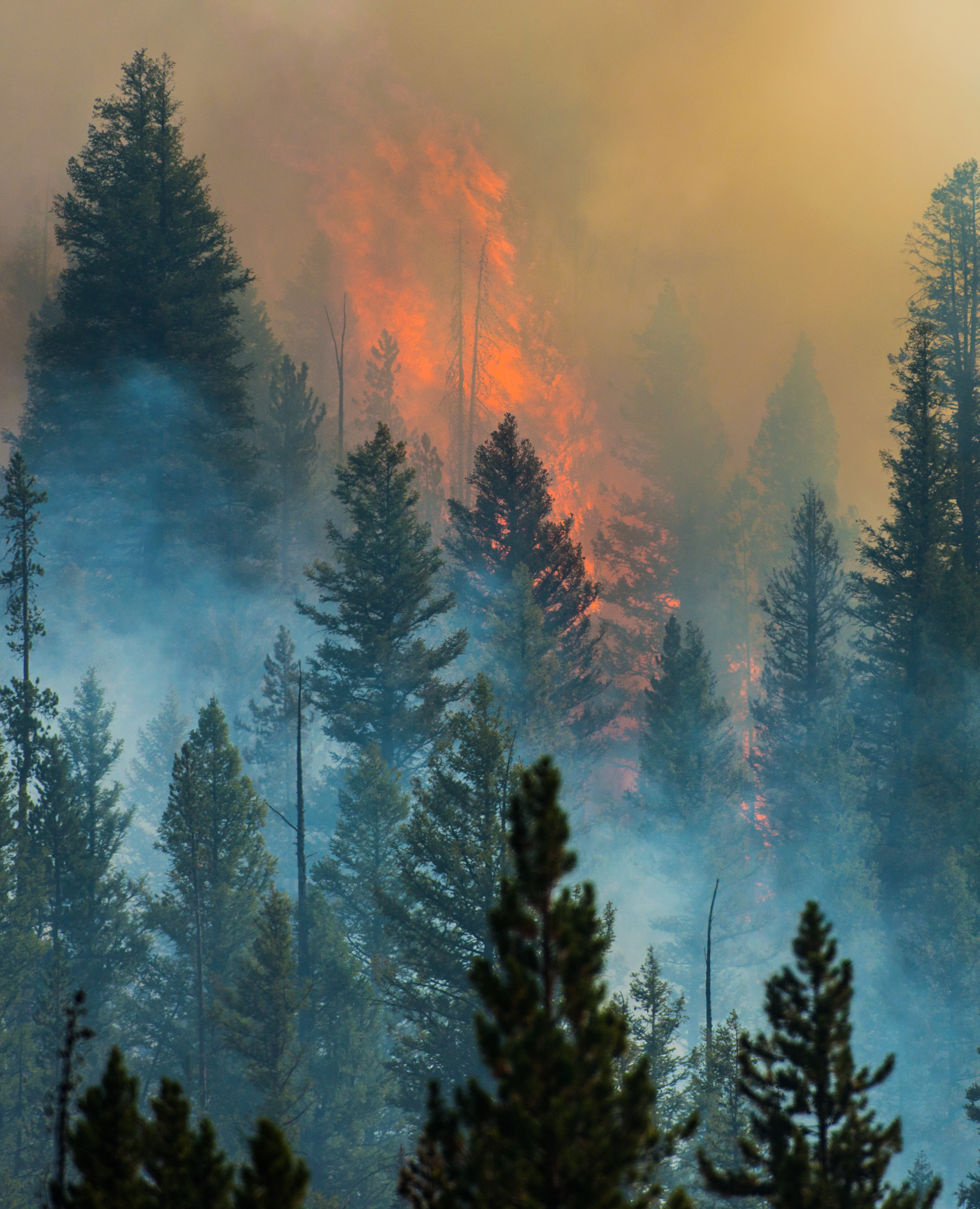
- Beaver Creek Fire
- Date: August 7, 2013 – August 31, 2013
- Location: Blaine and Camas counties, Idaho, United States

Statistics
- Burned area: 114,900 acres (46,498 ha)

Impacts
- Cost: Estimated over $25 million

Map
- Map of Beaver Creek Fire and Past Fires Affected Area

The Beaver Creek Fire was a forest fire that began on August 7, 2013 after a lightning strike in an area twelve miles northeast of Fairfield, Idaho and northwest of Hailey, Idaho in Sawtooth National Forest. The fire burned through pine trees, sagebrush, timber in the understory, grass, and various riparian areas. The fire coated the resort areas of Hailey, Ketchum, and Sun Valley, in a layer of thick soot and ash. By the time the fire was fully contained on August 31, 114,900 acres of the Ketchum Ranger District of Sawtooth National Forest has been burned. Of the 114,900 acres burned, 57,000 acres were moderately damaged and 9,500 acres were severely damaged.

== Background ==
The area where the Beaver Creek Fire took place has seen several fires since 2000. The Castle Rock Fire took place in 2007 near this area and before that the 2001 Sage Fire. The Beaver Creek Fire was easily the biggest of these three. The Beaver Creek Fire is extremely similar to the Castle Rock Fire. The Castle Rock Fire was started by lightning, exactly like the Beaver Creek Fire. Both fires began around the same time. The Castle Rock Fire began August 16, and the Beaver Creek Fire began August 7. Neither fire killed any people. The Castle Rock fire burnt 48,520 acres, the first "mega-fire" in the area, caused widespread evacuation in the height of tourist season and threatened both the town and the ski area, as did the later Beaver Creek fire. Both fires were attacked very early with small crews, but escaped to become huge fires. The threat to the Sun Valley area by these fires, which both started upwind of the resort was not at first recognized to be serious. Both would require enormous resources to control. Both fires affected their ecosystem in similar ways and will use similar recovery methods. For a fire to cause as much damage as the Beaver Creek Fire, several factors play a part in the behavior of the fire. The behavior of fire depends on weather, fuel, and topographic information.

The Beaver Creek Fire was a large fire, larger than the past fires in the same area. Large fires that burn many acres usually occur in hot, dry temperatures where there is intense build-up of vegetation. Where there is more vegetation build-up, there is more fuel for a fire. Large fires are usually difficult to suppress, fast moving, and displace many native species. In the beginning of the Beaver Creek Fire, the conditions in the area were dry, windy, low humidity, and a fairly hot temperature, which causes more active fires. Along with these factors and the fact that the area of the Beaver Creek Fire is a disturbance dependent ecosystem that was in its season where natural fires usually occurred caused the Beaver Creek Fire to grow to be the large, mainly surface fire it became. With the combination of weather, fuel, and topography that the Beaver Creek Fire took place in, it was hard to stop. Not until humidity increased, some rainstorms began to take place, and cloud cover appeared in the area was the Beaver Creek Fire able to be drastically slowed and contained.

== Negative impacts of fire on the environment ==
=== Plants ===
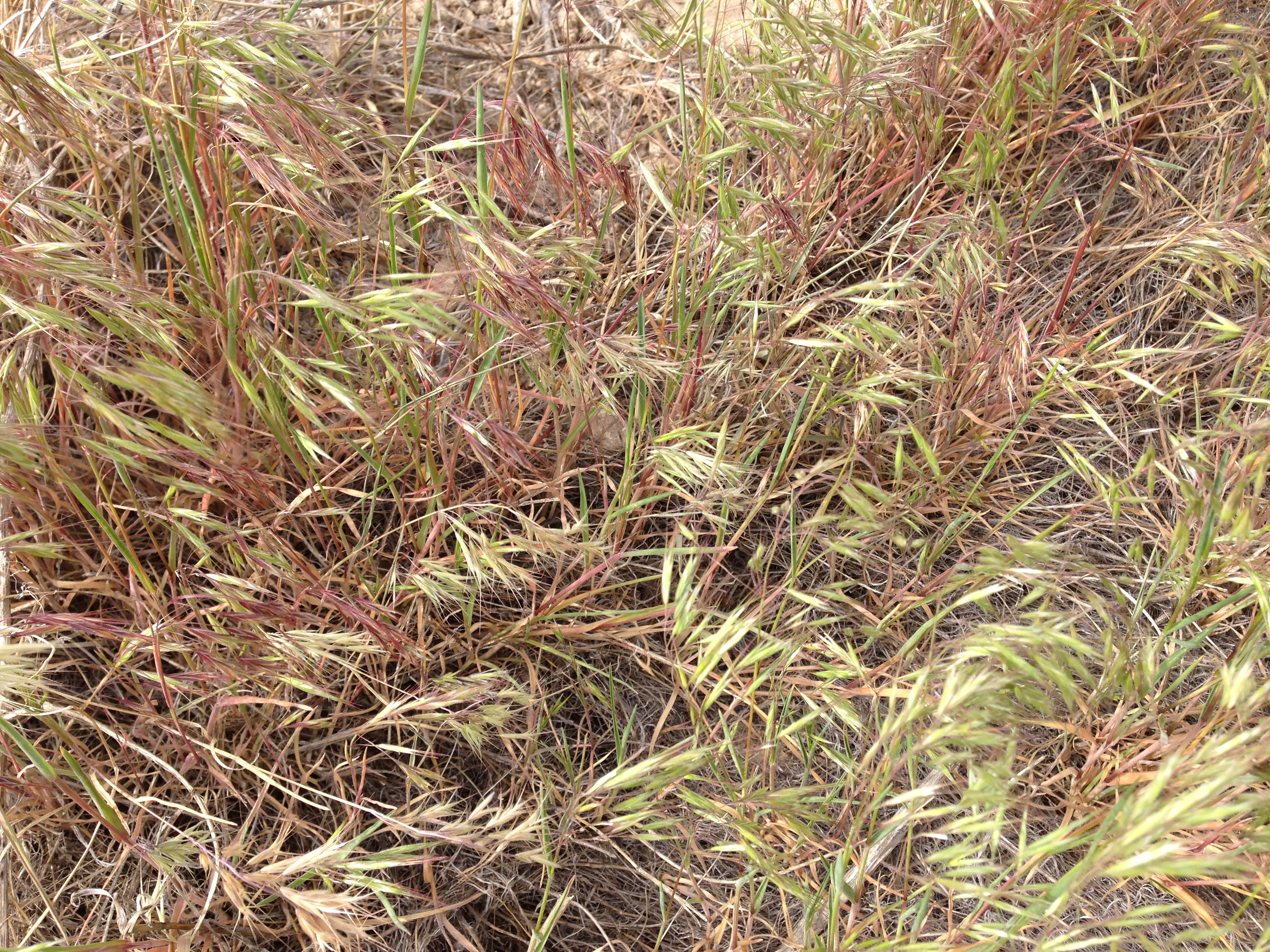
Cheat Grass

Fire can have negative effects such as presenting the opportunity for noxious and invasive plants to take over. Invasive plants can compete with native plants for water and soil causing the death of the native plants. The death of native plants leads to a loss of habitat and less food for native animals causing their populations to shrink. Invasive plants can affect the growth and spread rate of wildfires based on the invasive plant's moisture content, location, and type of fuel. An example of an invasive species in the area of the Beaver Creek Fire is cheat grass, Bromus tectorum. Cheat grass sprouts before Idaho's native plants, thus taking growth area away from native plants and habitat away from native animals. Cheat grass affects fires in the area because it grows in a continuous bed of grass, unlike the local grasses that grow in patches, which can be burned through more rapidly than native grass causing faster moving fires.

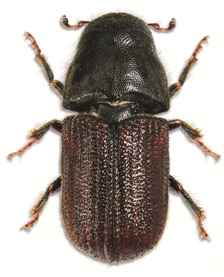
Mountain Pine Beetle

=== Animals ===
Invasive species can affect fire behavior. The area of the Beaver Creek Fire is known to be infested with Mountain Pine Beetles, Dendroctonus ponderosae. Mountain Pine Beetles kill trees by latching on to trees, consuming bark, and laying eggs inside the tree tissue. Trees able to reseed and grow continue to be attacked by the beetles. The tree mortality caused by the Mountain Pine Beetles increases fire hazard in the area and causes more high intensity fires. It is a proven fact the Mountain Pine Beetles have an increasing effect on the fire spread and fire intensity. The more trees the Mountain Pine Beetle kills, the more large woody fuel falls to the ground causing increased fire intensity and severity. The first few years after the destruction from the beetle is the time period when large amounts of fine dead fuels are present and woody fuels that produces the highest intensity and severe fires.

== Fire Dependency ==
The Beaver Creek ecosystem is a disturbance-dependent ecosystem, and fire is part of its disturbance regime. Being a disturbance-dependent ecosystem means that the native animals and plants adapted to the disturbance and depend on the disturbance for their survival.

=== Plants ===
Plants in fire related disturbance-dependent ecosystems can have serotinous pines, or they have a resin over their seeds to delay seed release. When the fire comes through it melts the resin and allows the seed to begin growing. Germination timed to fire is another method for plant survival. Germination timed to fire means that chemicals in a plant will trigger its growth once the ground is heated to a certain temperature by a fire. Resource allocation, a plant able to disperse its seeds in a large area, helps with plant survival during fire as well. In the area where the Beaver Creek Fire took place, lodge pole pine trees and juniper trees are just two plants in the ecosystem that are fire-dependent.

=== Animals ===
Animals in fire-dependent ecosystems have protective or survival methods just as plants do. Animals have internal mechanisms that cause them to reproduce around the fire disturbance regime, this is called reproductive timing. Animals can smell or sense a fire coming so they can either escape or hide to survive the fire.

=== Positive impacts of fire on the environment ===
Fire is beneficial in fire-dependent ecosystems. Fire can increase soil nutrients, increase resource availability, decrease competition, decrease soil microorganisms, and control invasive species. If no fire occurs for an extended period of time, plants can begin to crowd out new plant growth, such as sagebrush and grasses in the Beaver Creek Fire area, and cause habitat loss, for birds such as sage grouse. Fire acts as a cleansing agent because "by burning dead trees and other vegetation along with the crowded plants and trees" more space is made for new growth. The best type of fire for cleansing an ecosystem is a slow moving fire that burns few trees and lots of ground vegetation. These types of fires usually produce a "mosaic pattern", not all trees and vegetation is burned, so that there is a good mixture between new growth and fully matured plants.

== Wind speed and land slope ==
Wind speed and land slope, like a mountain where the Beaver Creek Fire took place, influences fire behavior, specifically the spread of the fire. Wind makes fire grow faster. As wind speed increase, the spread of the fire increases more quickly and can help increase the intensity of the fire. Fire can even create some of its own wind to disperse the heat downward from the heart of the flame to the unburnt fuel ahead of the fire, which helps in the rate of spread of the fire and increases the longevity of the fire. Some argue that the increase in the spread rate of the fire from the windy conditions has to do with the increased oxygen supply in the fire. Others argue that this is not true because fires need a sufficient amount of oxygen to even start. Without wind, it is easier to stop a fire due to the fire not being pushed forward. Slope of land increases the spread of fire only and not the intensity. The reason for this is gravity pushes the fire down so that the area in front of the fire is heated up quicker and able to burn faster allowing the fire to burn more area in a period of time up a slope, even without wind, than just on flat ground.

== Effects of the 2013 fire ==
=== Impact on humans ===
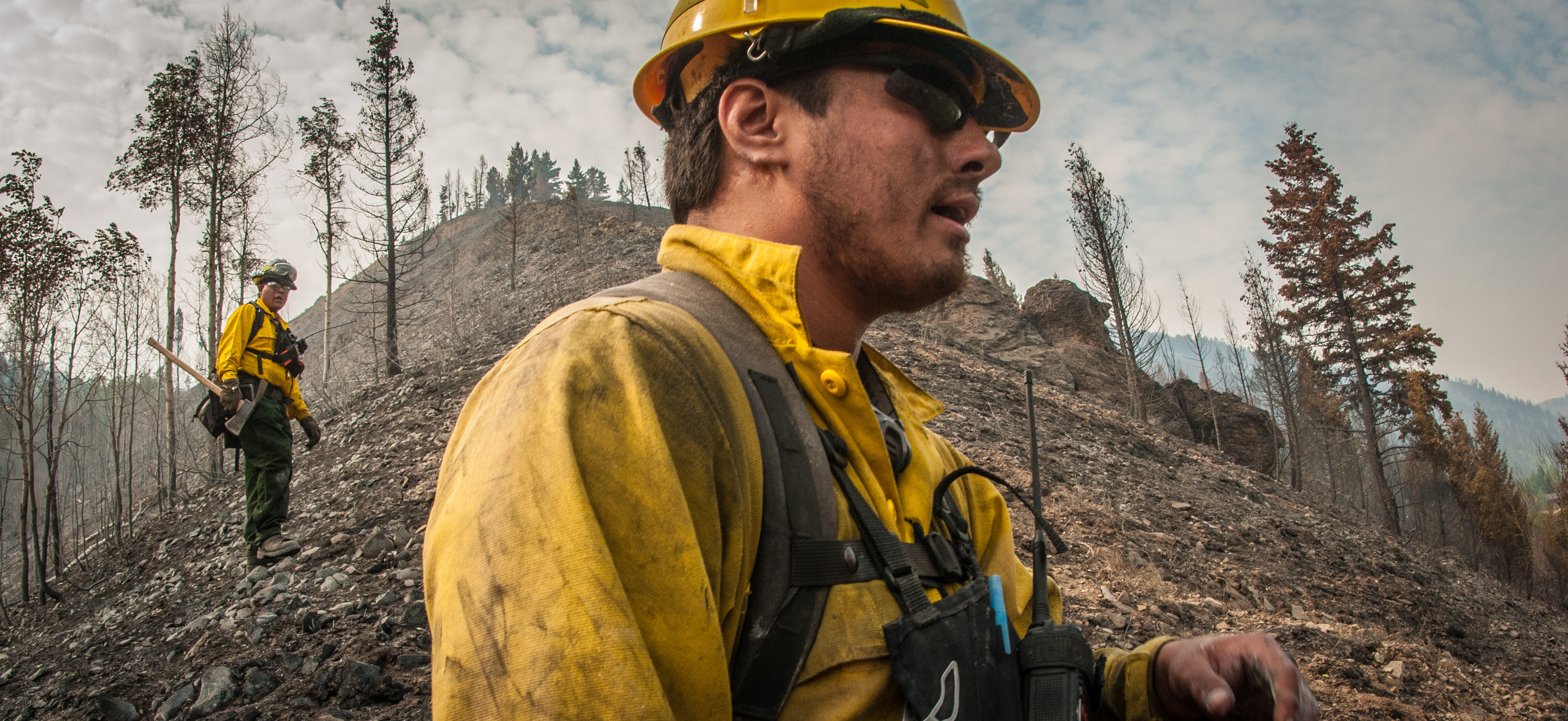
Firefighters working on the fire

Many areas had to be evacuated due to the fire as it approached populated areas. The fire was also fought by thousands of firefighters and some groups of specialized firefighters, called hot shots. Hot Shots are groups brought into an area to contain a wildfire. Eight helicopters with buckets attached filled with water mixed with a retardant were used to contain the fire, along with helitankers, helicopters with a built in container for water. Humans fighting the fire tried to contain the fire and prevent "slop over", where the fire crosses a control line to an unburned side. Lines of trees were cleared or "sawcut" so the fire had less fuel and by digging a fire line down into the mineral soil to stop the fire whenever it reached the ditch helped with containment. Firefighters even used the paths of past wildfires to help slow down the Beaver Creek Fire. They accomplished this by forcing the fire towards the boundary of the past fire and into a natural barrier. The last resort to stop the fire implemented by humans was the Governor of Idaho, Butch Otter, who declared the Beaver Creek Fire a state disaster area on August 14. This allowed the area more financial funds to fight the fire and more human resources, such as firefighters. The fire entered the Wood River Valley through Greenhorn Gulch, a canyon halfway between the towns of Hailey and Ketchum, and to some extent, through Deer Creek Canyon, just to the south. One home in Greenhorn was destroyed by the fire but more than 25 other homes were saved by the efforts of firefighting crews.

=== Impact on nature ===
Once the fire was contained the effects of the fire on the ecosystem do not stop there. The Beaver Creek Fire, first and foremost, gave new vegetation more room to grow and more access to sunlight for new trees. Grass will be the first to regrow and will begin to bring back wildlife. The fire had a variety of effects on animals. During the fire the larger animals were able to easily escape from the fire, but the smaller animals could not. Many of the small burrowing mammals in the area probably could not survive the intense heat of the Beaver Creek Fire, or the smoke, and died. Even if the fire decimates a native species, the species will eventually return to the area. Some animals will benefit from the fire. The elk will benefit from the new growth after the fire, and wasp and beetles will benefit because they can deposit their eggs in the burned stumps. The ecosystem will return to maximum capacity after time; it is what disturbance-dependent ecosystems do. First the insects will return, followed by the birds, and then the mammals; this is referred to as primary succession. The intense heat of the fire, combined with the massive amounts of ash, turned the soil into a condition known as hydrophobic, whereby water beads up upon and is effectively repelled by the soil. The resulting inability to absorb or percolate rainfall created dramatically altered drainage patterns. Very substantial rains in late August and early September 2013 caused a large number of debris flows down the hillsides and flooding in the Greenhorn area, resulting in serious damage to homes, roads and topography. The U.S. Geological Survey completed an analysis of the effect of the fire on drainage patterns and the risk of debris flows under three different rainfall scenarios within the area affected by the Beaver Creek Fire.

=== Douglas Fir Beetle ===
The area of the Beaver Creek Fire is known for the Douglas-Fir Beetle, Dendroctonus pseudotsugae, invading after fires. They invaded after the Castle Rock Fire. They can cause "undesired amounts of tree mortality" after a fire has taken place. For the beetles to "attack", they must be in adult stage, and there must be sufficient bark left for them to deposit their eggs on. The outbreak of the Douglas-Fir Beetles usually last up to 3 – 6 years. The beetles attack could be prolonged though since they will be attacking an area where fire recently took place.

== Recovery ==
As soon as the fire ended, a Burned Area Emergency Response, BAER, team was sent to analyze the area of the Beaver Creek Fire. The BAER team conducts rapid assessments of watersheds with analyses of the fire affected area conducted by civil engineers and multi-discipline scientific specialists, such as soil scientists, hydrologists, geologists, biologists, botanists, silviculturists, and archeologists. The team will go in to determine what areas were most severely affected by the fire, what emergency conditions exist, and what emergency response action should be taken. After this report of the area is taken, the BAER team may recommend rapid reseeding of the area, enlarging or unplugging culverts to drain water, removing structures that could block water flow, trap sediment, or impact water quality, or to post certain warning signs, barriers, or closures to limit hazardous area access. Currently, the main recovery goal is to get the water off the trails as quickly as possible and to place hazard signs along the road and trails. Erosion control is the next big goal. The goal is for erosion control to be implemented before the first big rainfall to, hopefully, stop mudslides from burying roads and private property. Erosion and mudslides are the biggest after fire dangers and can last 3 – 5 years. Other plans for recovery include placing straw waddles down as erosion barriers, using bulldozers for reseeding, aerial dropping straw and mulch on intensely burned hillsides for drainage purposes, using log stabilizers to stop erosion, cleaning out and removing some culverts on the roads and adding over 1,000 new drainage structures to the trails impacted by the fire.
