= Ketchum Ranger District Administrative Site =

- U.S. National Register of Historic Places
- U.S. Historic district
- Location within Idaho Location within the United States
- Location: 131/171 River St., Ketchum, Idaho
- Coordinates: 43°40′42″N 114°21′45″W
- Area: 1.5 acres (0.61 ha)
- Built: 1929
- Architect: Nichols, George L.; Civilian Conservation Corps
- Architectural style: Forest Service Standard Plan
- NRHP reference No.: 07000005
- Added to NRHP: February 9, 2007

The Ketchum Ranger District Administrative Site is a historic site at 131/171 River St. in Ketchum, Idaho. Significance of the site dates to 1929. It has also been known as Ketchum Ranger Station and as the Heritage and Ski Museum.

It is a compound that served as District Office for the ranger serving the Sawtooth National Forest during 1929 to 1965. After 1965 it served as a work station and residence for Forest Service staff, including fire fighters. According to a Historic American Buildings Survey profile, "The compound is typical of Forest Service compounds constructed during the Depression Era, and retains much of its original character.

It was designed by George L. Nichols and built by Civilian Conservation Corps (CCC) labor. Its architecture is "Forest Service Standard Plan". It was listed on the National Register in 2007; the listing included seven contributing buildings on 1.5 acres (0.61 ha).
