= Sawtooth National Forest =

National forest located in Idaho and Utah in the United States

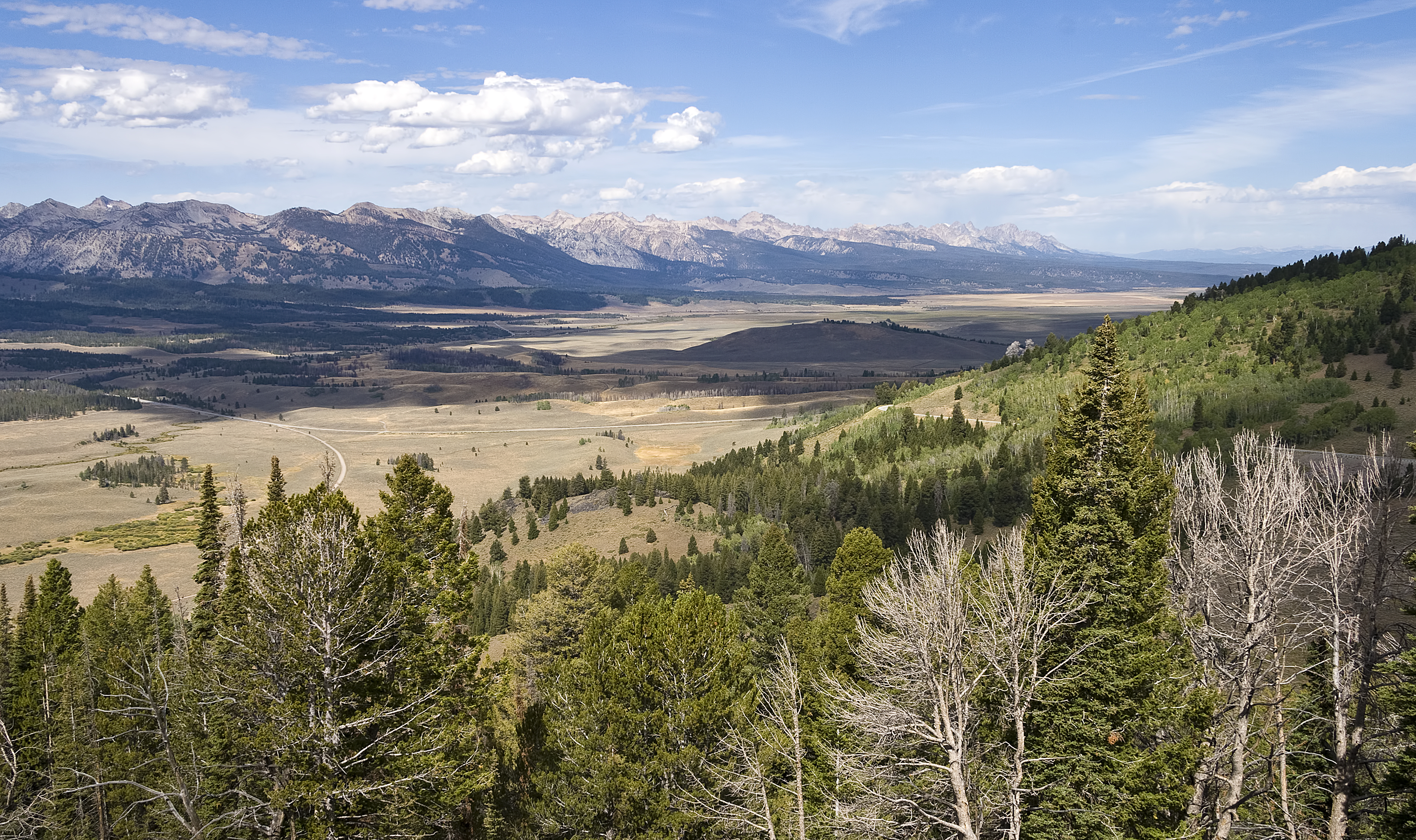
- Sawtooth Valley from Galena Summit

- Location within the United States
- Location: Blaine, Boise, Camas, Cassia, Custer, Elmore, Oneida, Power, and Twin Falls counties, Idaho, and Box Elder County, Utah, United States
- Nearest city: Twin Falls, ID
- Coordinates: 43°44′N 114°40′W
- Area: 2,110,408 acres (8,540.52 km^{2}) (administered); 1,802,133 acres (7,292.97 km^{2}) (proclaimed)
- Established: May 29, 1905
- Visitors: 1,188,600 (in 2005)
- Governing body: U.S. Forest Service
- Website: Sawtooth National Forest

Sawtooth National Forest is a national forest that covers 2,110,408 acres (854,052 ha) in the U.S. states of Idaho (~96 percent) and Utah (~4 percent). Managed by the U.S. Forest Service in the U.S. Department of Agriculture, it was originally named the Sawtooth Forest Reserve in a proclamation issued by President Theodore Roosevelt on May 29, 1905. On August 22, 1972, a portion of the forest was designated as the Sawtooth National Recreation Area (SNRA), which includes the Sawtooth, Cecil D. Andrus–White Clouds, and Hemingway–Boulders wilderness areas. The forest is managed as four units: the SNRA and the Fairfield, Ketchum, and Minidoka Ranger Districts.

Sawtooth National Forest is named for the Sawtooth Mountains, which traverse part of the SNRA. The forest also contains the Albion, Black Pine, Boise, Boulder, Pioneer, Raft River, Smoky, Soldier, Sublett, and White Cloud mountain ranges, as well as Hyndman Peak, the ninth-highest point in Idaho at 12,009 feet (3,660 m) above sea level. Sawtooth National Forest contains land cover types which include sagebrush steppe, spruce-fir forests, alpine tundra, and over 1,100 lakes and 3,500 miles (5,600 km) of rivers and streams. Plants and animals found only in the Sawtooth National Forest and adjacent lands include Christ's Indian paintbrush, Davis' springparsley, the South Hills crossbill, and the Wood River sculpin.

The area that is now Sawtooth National Forest was first occupied by people as early as 8000 BC and by the Shoshone tribe after 1700 AD. The first European descendants migrating from the eastern United States arrived in the area around the 1820s; they were mainly explorers, trappers, and prospectors, and they founded many of the current towns around what later became the forest. Sawtooth National Forest offers facilities for recreation, with four ski areas, whitewater and flatwater boating, hunting, 81 campgrounds, and over 1,000 mi (1,600 km) of trails and roads for hiking, mountain biking, and all-terrain vehicle use, including two National Recreation Trails.

== Forest history ==
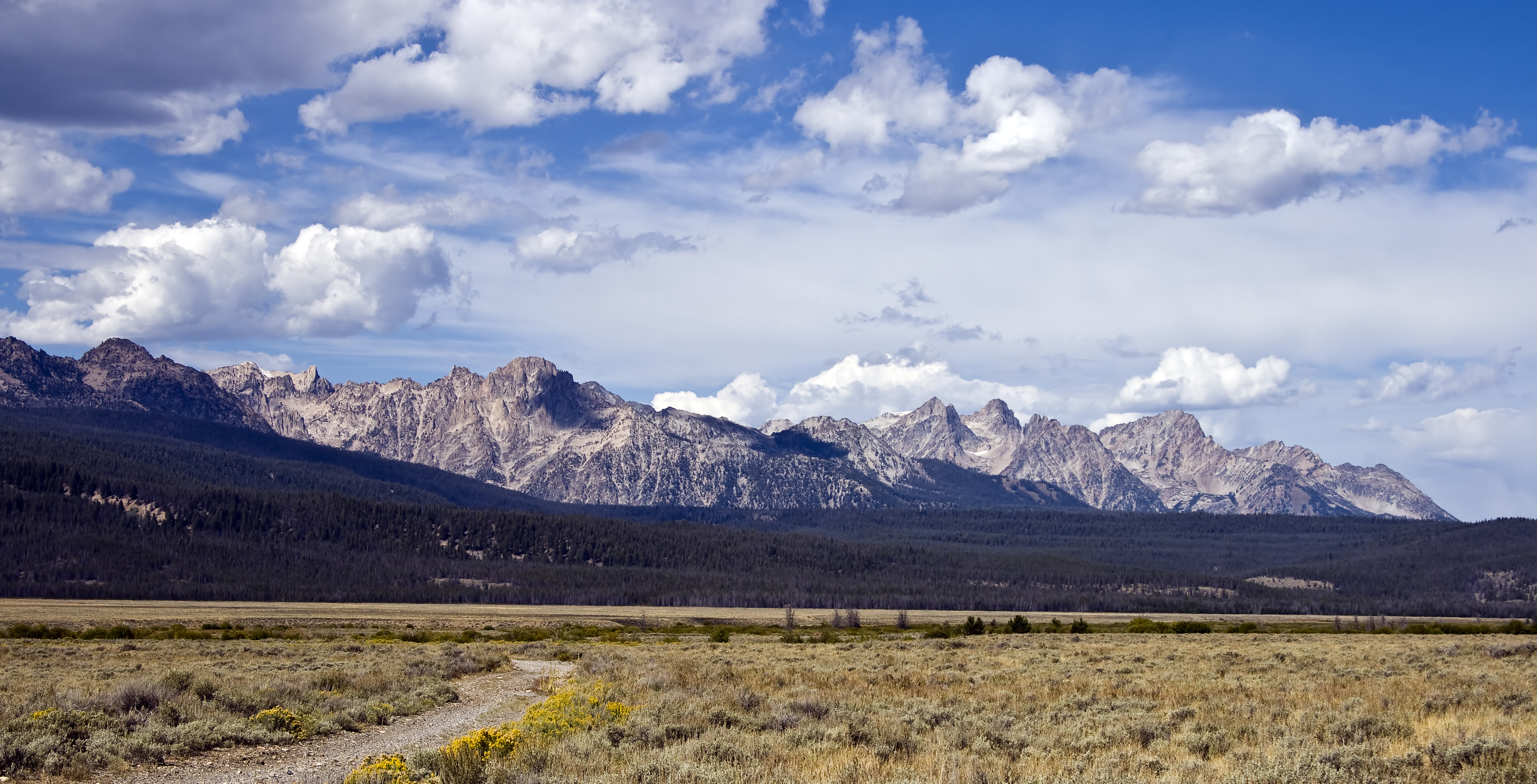
The Sawtooth Mountains from the southern Sawtooth Valley

The Forest Reserve Act of 1891 gave the President the authority to establish forest reserves in the U.S. Department of the Interior. After passage of the Transfer Act of 1905, forest reserves became part of the U.S. Department of Agriculture in the newly created U.S. Forest Service. Sawtooth National Forest was created as the Sawtooth Forest Reserve in the Department of Agriculture by proclamation of President Theodore Roosevelt on May 29, 1905. The forest's initial area was 1,947,520 acres (3,043 sq mi; 7,881 km^{2}), and it was named after the Sawtooth Mountains in the northwestern part of the forest.

On November 6, 1906, President Roosevelt announced the addition of 1,392,640 acres (2,176 sq mi; 5,636 km^{2}) to the Sawtooth Forest Reserve, which then also constituted much of the present-day Salmon-Challis and Boise National Forests. These lands were split into separate National Forests by executive order on June 26 and July 1, 1908. The forest's area underwent a number of smaller changes in the early 20th century. The Fairfield Ranger District was established in 1906 and merged with the Shake Creek Ranger District in 1972 to form the present-day Fairfield District. The Cassia Forest Reserve was established on June 12, 1905, and the Raft River Forest Reserve on November 5, 1906. The names of the forest reserves were changed to national forests on March 4, 1907. Formed from the consolidation of Cassia and Raft River National Forests, the Minidoka National Forest was created on July 1, 1908, and then added to Sawtooth National Forest on July 1, 1953.

In 1936, Senator James Pope, a one-term Democrat from Idaho, introduced the first legislation to establish a national park in the Sawtooths. Under his proposal, the park would have been approximately thirty miles (50 km) in length and 8 to 15 mi (13 to 24 km) wide. The rest of Idaho's congressional delegation did not support the proposal, which occurred at a time when the National Park Service was taking a more preservation-oriented stance, and the bill died. On October 12, 1937, the Forest Service established the Sawtooth Primitive Area in the Sawtooth Mountains. Subsequently, Sawtooth National Forest began to extensively develop recreation opportunities, including new campgrounds, trails, and roads.

In 1960, Democratic Senator Frank Church of Idaho introduced legislation for a feasibility study to survey the area for national park status. While Church allowed the 1960 feasibility study legislation to die, he introduced a bill in 1963 to create Sawtooth Wilderness National Park, which would primarily encompass the existing Sawtooth Primitive Area. Although the 1963 bill also was not voted on, Church admitted that it was not designed to pass but rather to encourage thorough feasibility studies by both the Forest Service and National Park Service. A 1965 joint report by the two agencies recommended either a national park administered by the National Park Service or a national recreation area managed by the Forest Service. In April 1966, Church introduced two bills, one to establish Sawtooth National Park and another to establish the Sawtooth National Recreation Area (SNRA). The SNRA bill was cosponsored by Republican Senator Len Jordan, a former governor and sheep rancher, because it preserved the area while also permitting traditional uses such as logging, hunting, and grazing. The legislation was not supported by Idaho's two members of the House; Republican congressman George Hansen of the second district introduced a separate bill in the House in April 1967.

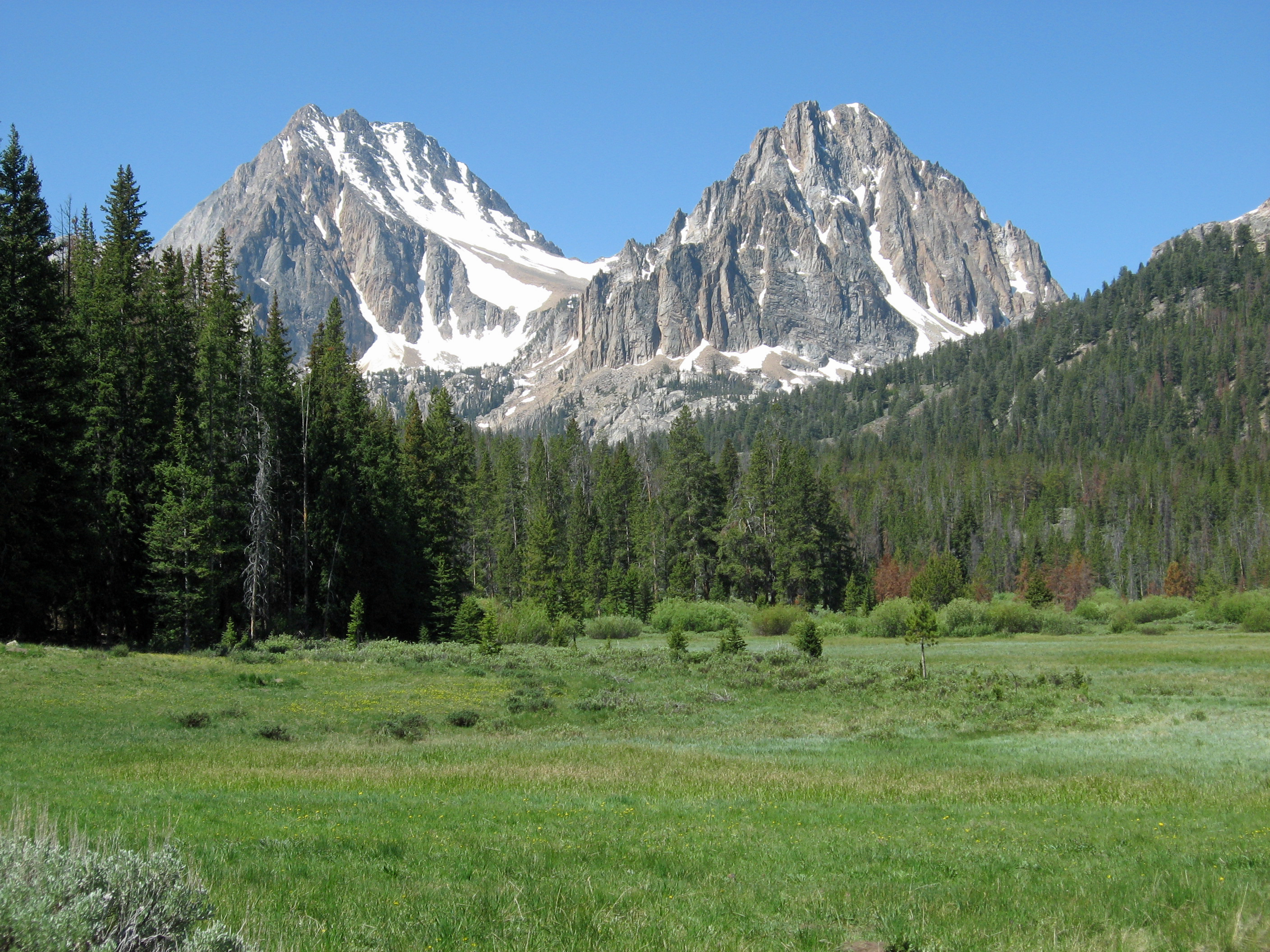
Castle (left) and Merriam (right) peaks in the White Cloud Mountains

In 1968, the American Smelting and Refining Company (ASARCO) discovered a molybdenum deposit at the base of Castle Peak, the highest peak in the White Cloud Mountains. ASARCO filed paperwork with the Forest Service to construct roads and to allow for an open pit mine below Castle Peak to extract the ore. The proposed mine would have been 350 ft (110 m) deep, 700 ft (210 m) wide, and 7,000 ft (2,100 m) long. About 20,000 short tons (18,000 t) of material would be processed daily with 99.5 percent being deposited in waste piles and settling ponds. ASARCO estimated that the mine would create 350 jobs and $1 million ($9.26 million today) in taxes per year, while the roads would open up opportunities for further exploration. The Forest Service would not be able to stop mining and protect the White Cloud Mountains because the General Mining Act of 1872 gave mining rights to anyone who had located a lode or placer. Nationally, opposition to the mine mounted, while Republican Governor Don Samuelson voiced support for the mine in 1970, saying that ASARCO was not, "going to tear down mountains. They are only going to dig a hole." He also characterized Castle Peak as, "nothing but sagebrush on one side and scraggly trees on the other." Samuelson lost his reelection bid that November in a rematch with Democrat Cecil Andrus, a supporter of preserving the forest who later (1977–1981) served as U.S. interior secretary in the Carter Administration.

In March 1971, Idaho's congressional delegation, which included senators Church and Jordan and Republican representatives Jim McClure and Orval Hansen, was finally united and introduced legislation to create the SNRA. On August 22, 1972, Public Law 92-400 establishing the SNRA, covering 756,019 acres (1,181 sq mi; 3,060 km^{2}), and banning mining passed both the House and Senate and was signed into law by Republican President Richard Nixon. This legislation included the White Cloud and Boulder Mountains as part of the SNRA. The 217,088-acre (339 sq mi; 879 km^{2}) Sawtooth Primitive Area became the Sawtooth Wilderness (also in the SNRA) as part of the National Wilderness Preservation System under the Wilderness Act of 1964. The original bill also authorized $19.8 million ($152 million today) for land acquisition and up to $26 million ($200 million today) for development. The SNRA was dedicated in a ceremony held on the shores of Redfish Lake on September 1, 1972. The Burley and Twin Falls Ranger Districts of Sawtooth National Forest were consolidated on October 16, 2002, into the Minidoka Ranger District.

On August 7, 2015, Democratic President Barack Obama signed the Sawtooth National Recreation Area and Jerry Peak Wilderness Additions Act to create three wilderness areas: Hemingway–Boulders, Jim McClure–Jerry Peak, and White Clouds. They cover a total of 275,665 acres (431 sq mi; 1,116 km^{2}) of central Idaho, primarily in Sawtooth National Forest. On March 23, 2018, the White Clouds Wilderness was renamed the Cecil D. Andrus–White Clouds Wilderness in honor of Andrus and his efforts to protect central Idaho.

== Management ==
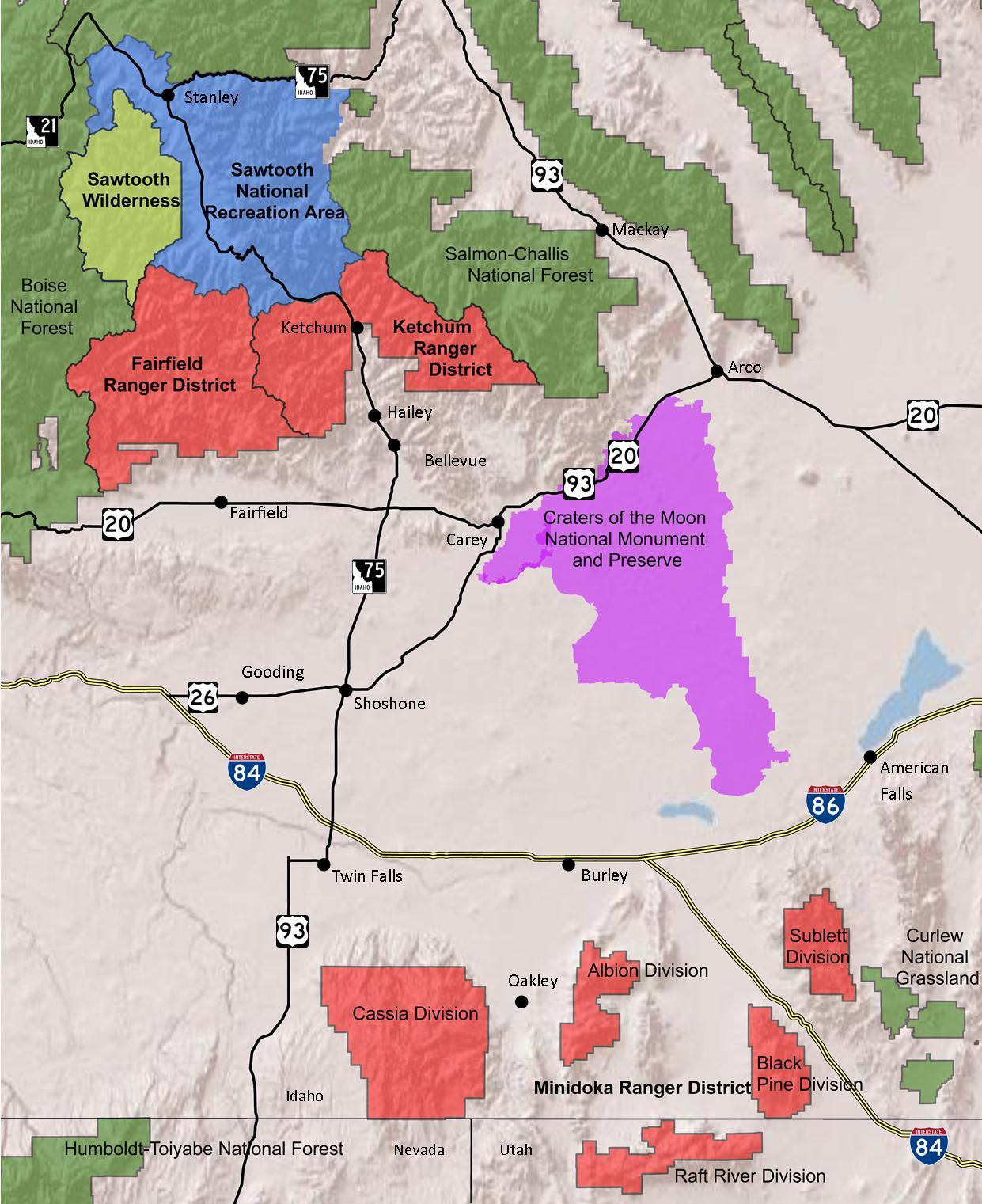
An overview map of Sawtooth National Forest (red), including Sawtooth National Recreation Area (blue) and Sawtooth Wilderness (yellow)

Sawtooth National Forest is managed by the U.S. Forest Service, an agency within the Department of Agriculture, as four units: the Fairfield (420,720 acres or 170,260 hectares), Ketchum (321,544 acres or 130,124 hectares), and Minidoka (604,108 acres or 244,474 hectares) Ranger Districts and Sawtooth National Recreation Area (SNRA). The forest's headquarters are in Jerome, where they moved to in 2018 after 32 years of being headquartered in Twin Falls. The Minidoka Ranger District is separated into the Albion (95,000 acres or 38,000 hectares), Black Pine (90,000 acres or 36,000 hectares), Cassia (234,000 acres or 95,000 hectares), Raft River (95,000 acres or 38,000 hectares), and Sublett (90,000 acres or 36,000 hectares) divisions.

Guard stations and work camps dot the forest. The SNRA headquarters and main visitor center are located north of the city of Ketchum, while there is a ranger station in Stanley and visitor center at Redfish Lake. There are more than 25,000 acres (10,000 ha) of private land inholdings within the forest, and it is bordered by the Boise and Salmon-Challis National Forests as well as private, state, and Bureau of Land Management land. Curlew National Grassland is 1.5 mi (2.4 km) from the Sublett Division's eastern boundary. Small portions of the area originally designated as Sawtooth National Forest are managed by the Boise and Challis National Forests, while the Sawtooth manages portions of the Boise and Challis National Forests.

Sawtooth National Forest balances interests of different groups, such as those interested in recreation, preservation, or resource extraction. The forest practices conservation of resources, in some areas allowing for production of raw materials, such as lumber for construction purposes and wood pulp for paper products, alongside recreational uses, while in other areas only recreation is permitted. Additionally, mineral extraction through mining and oil and natural gas exploration and recovery are also conducted, though in Sawtooth National Forest this has become less common due to a consensus to protect the natural surroundings. Leases offered to ranchers to allow them to graze cattle and sheep on the forest are common. The forest provides guidelines and enforces environmental regulations to ensure that resources are not overexploited and that necessary commodities are available for future generations.

=== Wilderness ===
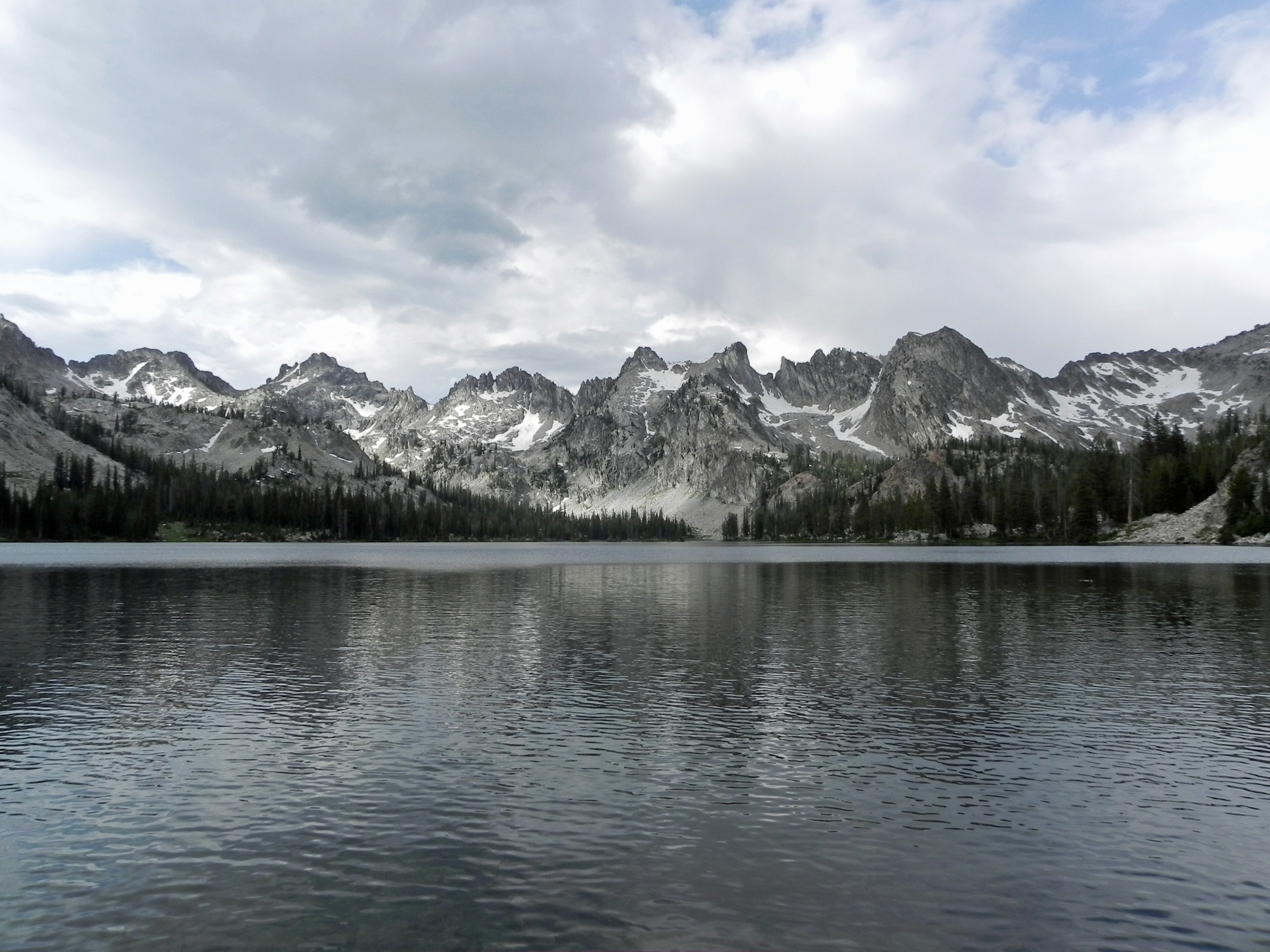
Alice Lake in the Sawtooth Wilderness

The Sawtooth Wilderness was originally designated the Sawtooth Primitive Area in 1937 before becoming part of the National Wilderness Preservation System in 1972 under the Wilderness Act. Although entirely managed by Sawtooth National Forest, only about a quarter (25.33 percent) of the Sawtooth Wilderness lies within the area Congressionally designated as Sawtooth National Forest, with the majority (69.13 percent) lying in Boise National Forest and a relatively small portion (5.54 percent) in Salmon-Challis National Forest. According to the United States Environmental Protection Agency, the Sawtooth Wilderness has some of the clearest air in the lower 48 states.

On August 7, 2015, President Barack Obama signed the Sawtooth National Recreation Area and Jerry Peak Wilderness Additions Act creating the Hemingway–Boulders (67,998 acres or 27,518 hectares), Jim McClure–Jerry Peak (116,898 acres or 47,307 hectares), and White Clouds (90,769 acres or 36,733 hectares) wilderness areas covering a combined 275,665 acres (111,558 ha) of Sawtooth National Forest, Salmon-Challis National Forest, and Bureau of Land Management (BLM) land after it passed Congress on August 4, 2015. The Hemingway–Boulders Wilderness is entirely within SNRA, while all but 450 acres (180 ha) of the White Clouds Wilderness is in the SNRA, with the rest managed by the BLM. The Jim McClure–Jerry Peak wilderness is entirely outside the administered area of Sawtooth National Forest, but partially within the area designated as Sawtooth National Forest and thus managed by Salmon-Challis National Forest and the BLM. The 2015 bill and previous versions were introduced by Republican Representative Mike Simpson, while prior bills had proposed to designate 312,000 acres (126,000 ha) of wilderness as part of the controversial Central Idaho Economic Development and Recreation Act (CIEDRA). CIEDRA would have opened over 500,000 acres (200,000 ha) adjacent to the new wilderness areas to motorized vehicle use, given 5,693 acres (2,304 ha) of public land to local municipalities, and established a "no net loss" policy for motorized trails.

Prior to the 2015 wilderness designations, the White Cloud and Boulder mountains were part of the largest unprotected roadless area in the United States outside of Alaska. In the absence of Congressional action that would designate the Boulder-White Clouds region as wilderness, the area had been studied for possible protection as a national monument by presidential proclamation under the Antiquities Act. Former Secretary of the Interior Dirk Kempthorne initially studied the area for national monument status, but did not recommend it because Congressional action seemed likely. The 2015 bill passed after receiving increased attention when President Obama indicated he would designate a national monument in the area if the wilderness bill did not pass. Additionally, other large areas of the forest are parts of proposed wilderness areas, such as through the Northern Rockies Ecosystem Protection Act. These other proposals have gained no support among Idaho's congressional delegation because the bills could place undue public use and development restrictions on Idaho's public lands.

The Wilderness Act enhanced the protection status of remote or undeveloped land already contained within federally administered protected areas. Passage of the act ensured that no human improvements would take place aside from those already existing. The protected status in wilderness-designated zones prohibits road and building construction, oil and mineral exploration or mining, and logging, and also prohibits the use of motorized equipment and bicycles. The ways people may enter wilderness areas are on foot or on horseback.

== Natural resources ==
=== Flora ===
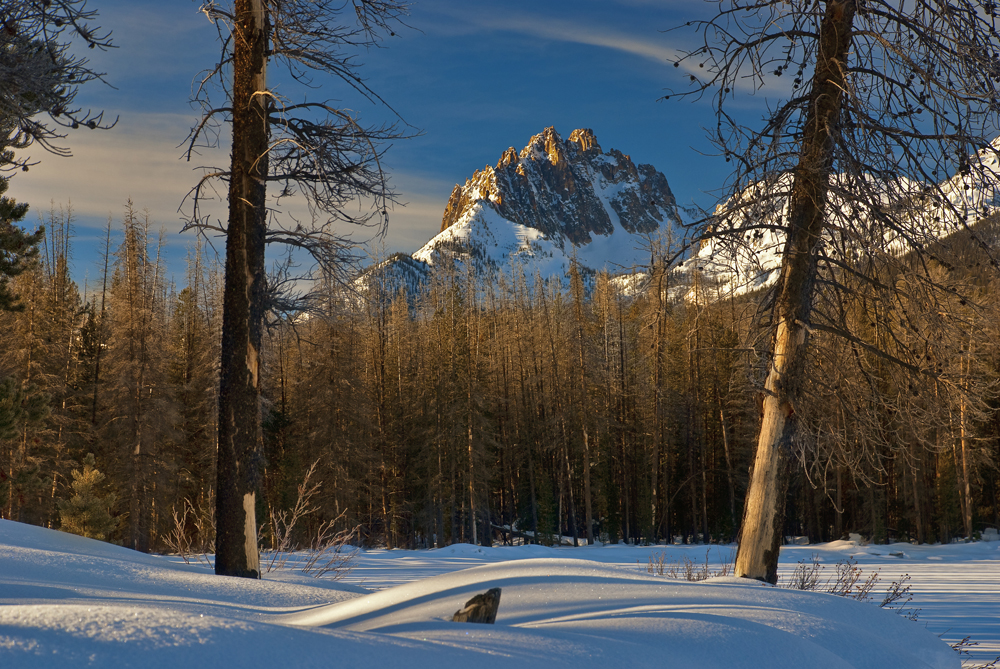
Pine beetle-killed trees below Mount Heyburn

About 47 percent of the forest's land is forested, and an additional 3 percent can support trees, but does not currently have any. Lower elevations in Sawtooth National Forest often have sagebrush and grassland vegetation types, while forested areas contain a variety of tree species. Lodgepole pine forms nearly monotypic forests in part of the SNRA with sparse vegetation under the tree cover. Plants that can be found under lodgepole pines include grasses, scattered forbs, dwarf huckleberry, and grouse whortleberry. Douglas-fir and quaking aspen are found in similar environments throughout the forest with understories of low shrubs, such as common snowberry and white spirea. Aspen is also found throughout the forest at elevations ranging from 5,000 ft (1,500 m) to 11,000 ft (3,400 m).

The highest elevation forests contain whitebark pine, Engelmann spruce, subalpine fir, and limber pine, including the largest individual whitebark pine in North America. Based on tree ring chronologies, some of the whitebark pines are believed to be 700 to 1000 or more years old. The highest elevation forests typically have understories of grasses and forbs that are resistant to freezing at any point of the growing season. Willows, alders, cottonwoods, and sedges are found in riparian areas. Ponderosa pine occupy the dry, lower elevations near the western edge of the forest and historically persisted due to the occurrence of frequent non-lethal fires. Ponderosa pine forest understories typically consist of perennial grasses such as Idaho fescue and bluebunch wheatgrass. In the slightly moister ponderosa pine forests grasses such as pinegrass are found with a cover of shrubs including white spirea, common snowberry, and mallow ninebark.

The Minidoka District is separated from the rest of the forest by the Snake River Plain, also known as Idaho's potato belt; snowmelt from the forest provides a steady supply of water to the plain. The Minidoka District is a part of the Basin and Range Province, and while much of the vegetation here is similar to the northern part of the forest, the presence of Rocky Mountain juniper is notable as well as is the occasional cactus plant. In these pinyon-juniper woodlands trees also include singleleaf pinyon, Utah juniper, and curl-leaf mountain mahogany. Idaho's rarest plant, the Christ's Indian paintbrush, is endemic to 200 acres (81 ha) on upper elevations of Mount Harrison in the Albion Mountains in the Minidoka District. Davis' springparsley is also endemic to the Albion Mountains. Additionally, the forest contains potential habitat for the threatened Ute lady's tresses.

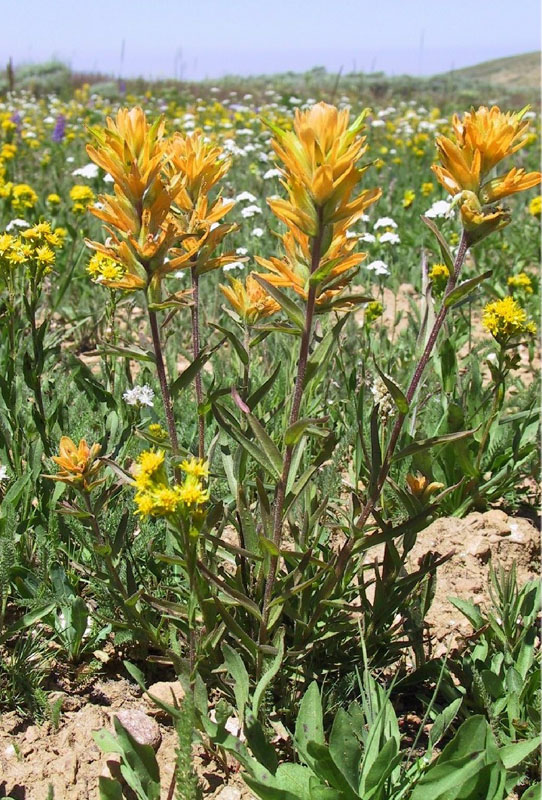
Castilleja christii, Christ's Indian paintbrush

Exotic species (also known as invasive or non-native species) are often unintentionally introduced by people traveling from outside the forest by sticking to vehicle tires, shoes, or cattle and are usually found near roadways, campgrounds, and other areas used by people. The Forest Service has an invasive species control effort that identifies and attempts to contain the further spread of non-native plants. Invasive plants of particular concern in the forest include spotted knapweed, yellow starthistle, rush skeletonweed, leafy spurge, and cheatgrass.

The mountain pine beetle is a native insect species that is known to experience large outbreaks that infest forest groves, and is particularly common in areas with numerous lodgepole pines and fir trees. A large infestation occurred from 1995 through 2003, and the beetle wiped out areas of lodgepole pine in the SNRA, an area historically too cold for outbreaks to occur.

=== Fauna ===
Sawtooth National Forest is home to over 243 bird species, 78 mammals, 28 reptiles and amphibians, and 29 fish. Invasive zebra and quagga mussels are potential threats to the forest's aquatic ecosystems because they can spread rapidly and cover large surface areas, including human structures, thus altering ecosystems, removing native mussels and threatening native fish. Wolves were controversially reintroduced to the SNRA in the mid-1990s to restore the ecosystem stability that they provide as top predators. This included managing high elk populations, which had inhibited new vegetation growth. Opponents to the reintroduction included hunters concerned that wolves would inhibit their ability to hunt the highest number of game species possible, ranchers concerned for the welfare of their animals, and land developers concerned that a species listed under the Endangered Species Act may restrict what they can do to their land.

Along with cougars, timber wolves are the largest top predators that live in the forest and have no predators of their own except humans. Most of the area's native mammal species are present in the forest, with the exception of grizzly bears, which have become locally extinct. Plans for their reintroduction to central Idaho have been proposed since the 1990s, but have not progressed because of concerns similar to those with the wolf reintroduction as well as fears for human safety. The northern and high elevation areas of the forest contain habitat for wolverines and the endangered Canadian lynx, but no recent sightings of these species have been reported.

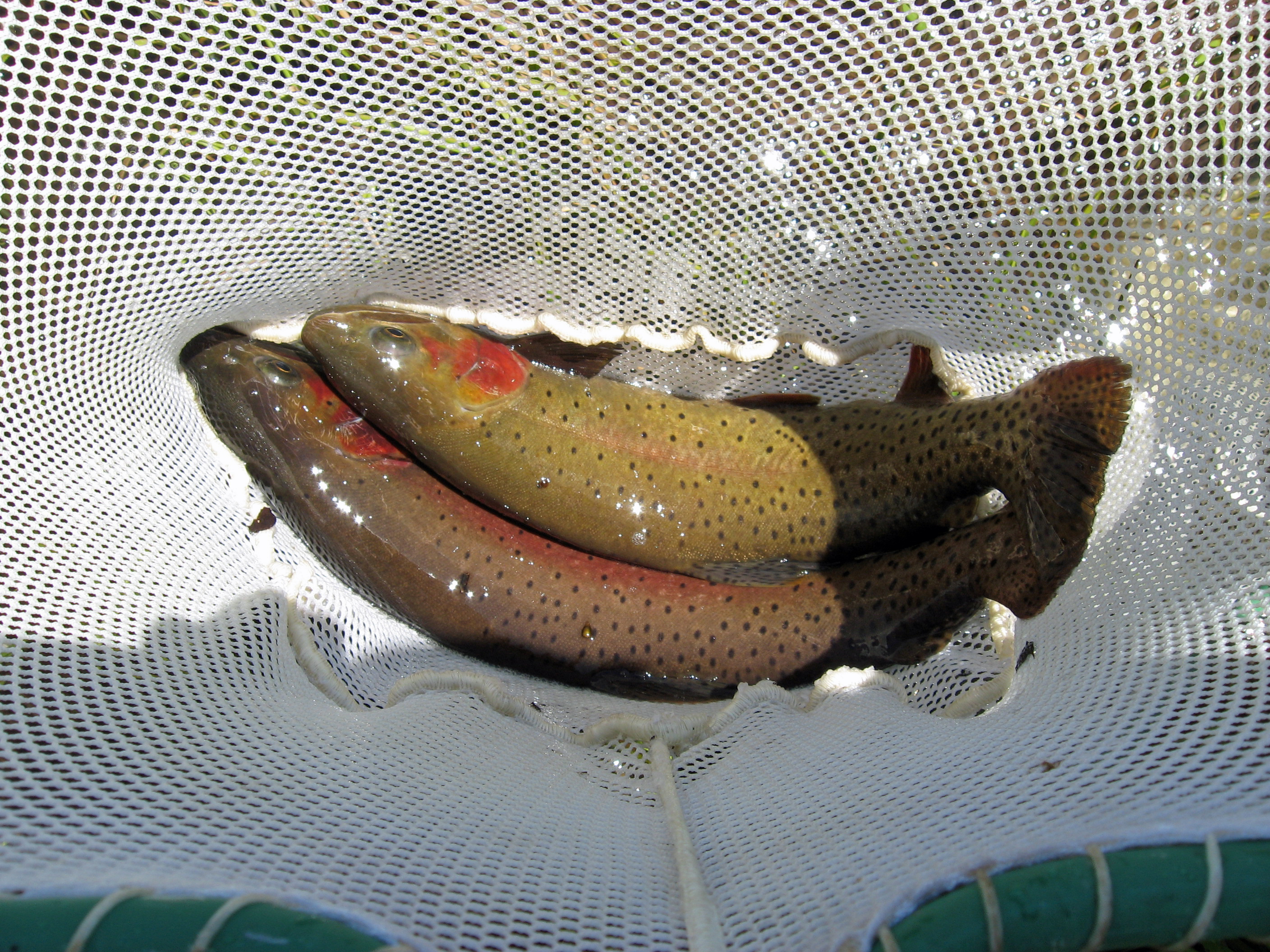
Cutthroat trout in the SNRA

Elk (also known as wapiti), mule deer, and pronghorn (also called pronghorn antelope) are some of the most commonly seen large mammals. During winter, pronghorn that spend the summer in the Sawtooth Valley migrate south to the lower elevations on the Snake River Plain, and some sections of the forest are closed to motorized use to protect the elk winter range. Bighorn sheep are rare sights in the forest, but the forest contains one-third of Idaho's mountain goat population, and they are commonly seen at high elevations in the Boulder, White Cloud, Pioneer, and Sawtooth mountains. Other mammals in the forest include the coyote, moose, bobcat, beaver, yellow-bellied marmot, pika, and badger.

Bull trout are one of the management indicator species for the forest. Population monitoring efforts are undertaken every year to provide an assessment of forest health. They were selected because they are dependent upon specific habitat conditions and are sensitive to habitat changes. Bull trout are only found in parts of the Salmon, Boise, and Payette river watersheds on the Fairfield District and the SNRA. The forest is home to the longest salmon migration in the continental United States, but with the damming of the Columbia River, salmon populations have collapsed. Redfish Lake was named for the sockeye salmon that would return to breed in the lake and its tributaries and historically had 10,000 to 35,000 adult fish return to the lake annually. Between 1990 and 1998 a total of 16 adult fish returned to Redfish Lake, but populations have recovered somewhat, and in 2014 approximately 1400 adult fish returned, up from 1100 in 2011. Repeated efforts to repopulate the sockeye salmon have taken place in the Columbia River watershed, and in 2008 the first salmon season in 31 years was held for chinook salmon in the upper Salmon River. Brook trout have been introduced to the forest and are now an invasive species that compete with the threatened bull trout. The Wood River sculpin is a fish species that is endemic to the Big Wood River and its tributaries on the Ketchum District and is listed as vulnerable by the International Union for Conservation of Nature (IUCN) Red List. Rainbow trout, cutthroat trout, and mountain whitefish are all native to portions of the forest waterways.

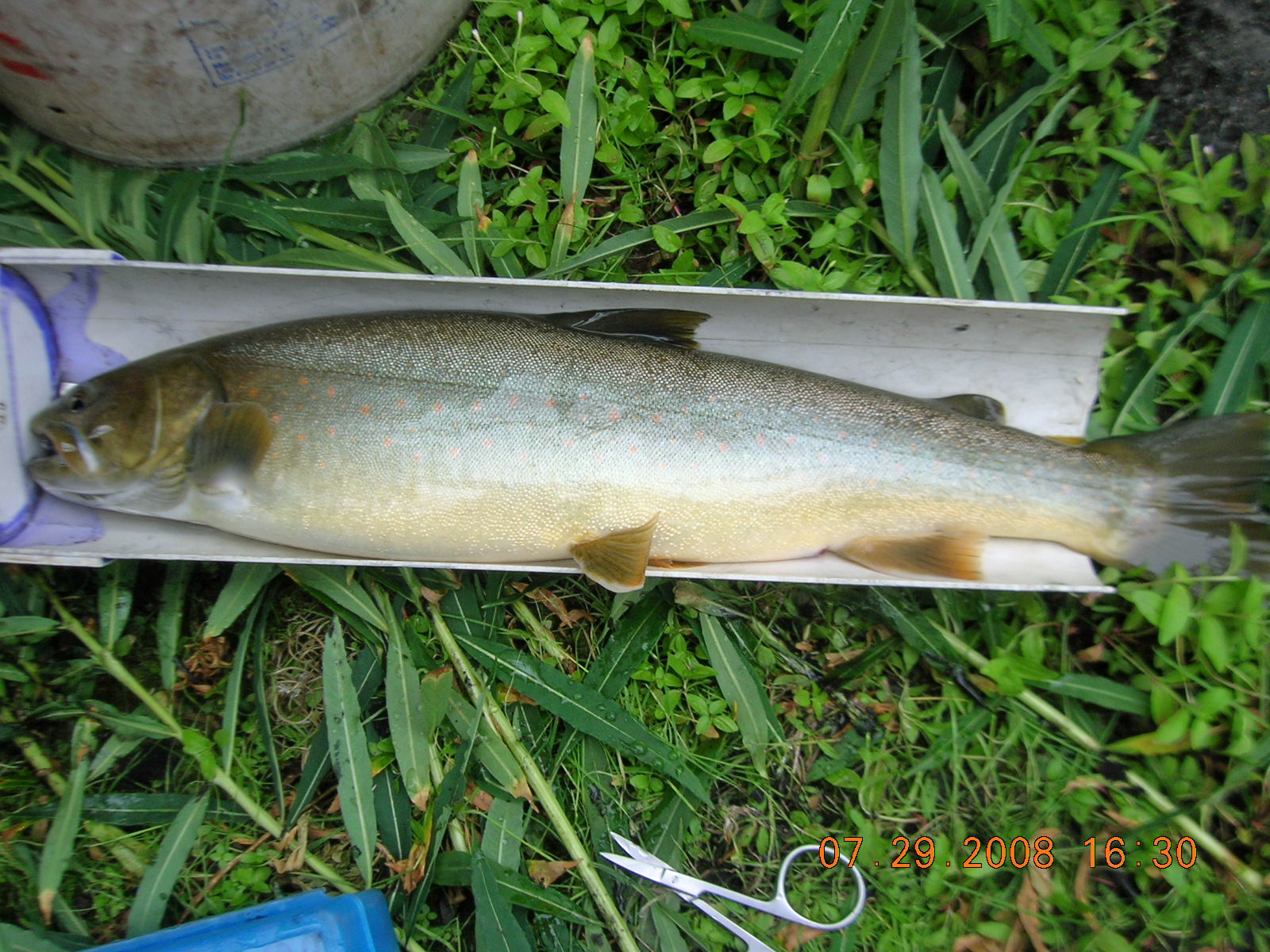
A bull trout in the SNRA

243 bird species have been observed in the upper Salmon River Basin, with an additional 36 accidental species, or those that are not normally found in the region but have been observed on at least one occasion. Bald eagles can be found on the forest, particularly along rivers, while golden eagles are occasionally seen over the sagebrush steppe. Northern goshawks are listed by the Forest Service as a sensitive species and are found on the forest. Black-billed magpies are common on the forest, and sandhill cranes are seen during the breeding season in the Sawtooth Valley. Black rosy finch breed at the highest elevations in the northern section of the forest, while greater sage-grouse can be found in sagebrush habitats throughout the forest.

The South Hills crossbill is a finch endemic to the South Hills and Albion Mountains in the Minidoka District. It rarely interbreeds with similar crossbills that are present in its range, and it has been proposed as a separate species created via ecological speciation. The American Ornithologists' Union failed to find consensus on the issue so the South Hills crossbill is still considered a subspecies of the red crossbill.

There are few reptiles in the forest. Snakes species include bullsnakes and rubber boas, as well as western rattlesnakes, which are most likely to be found at lower elevations and in the Minidoka District. Amphibians including the Columbia spotted frog, long-toed salamander, and the Rocky Mountain tailed frog are relatively common.

=== Fire ecology ===
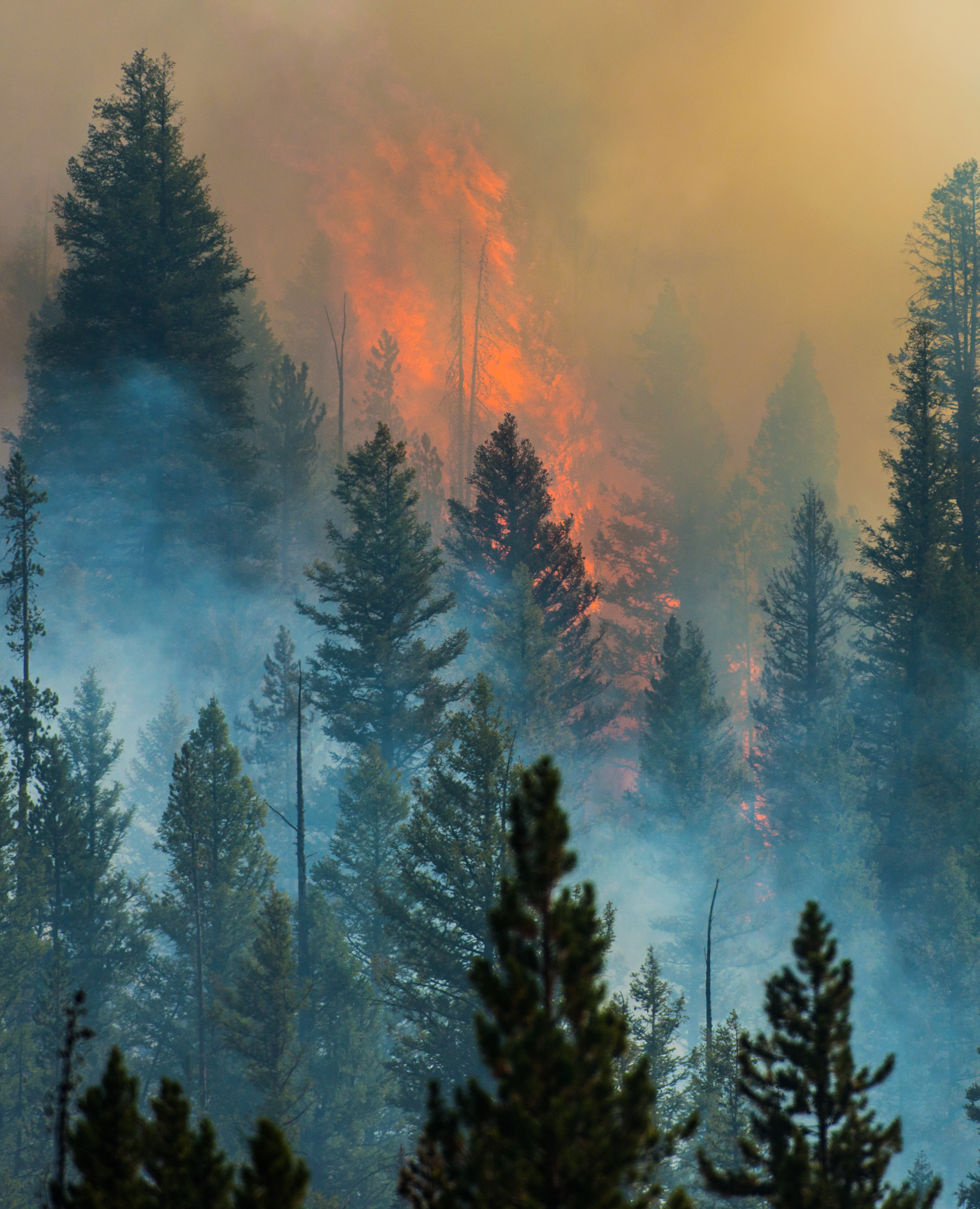
The 2013 Beaver Creek Fire

Sawtooth National Forest has an active Fire Management Program which recognizes that forest fires are a natural part of the ecosystem, but this was not always the case. The 1987 forest plan did not recognize fire as an ecosystem process or as a tool for ecosystem management; this was rectified in the 2012 forest plan. Previous firefighting efforts, which emphasized quickly extinguishing all fires, caused dead and dying trees to accumulate well in excess of the level found when fires are allowed to burn out naturally. Historically speaking, fires became more common in parts of the SNRA after the development of lodgepole pine forests, which occurred prior to 1450 AD. Between 1989 and 1998 there were on average 50 fires per year, with 58 percent of them caused by lightning. The Smoky Mountains of Idaho were named from the frequent forest fires, and in 2007 the Castle Rock Fire burned 48,000 acres (19,000 ha) of the Smoky Mountains near Ketchum. In 2005 the Valley Road Fire burned 40,800 acres (16,500 ha) in the White Cloud Mountains after being ignited from embers that came from a trash barrel which were blown out on a windy day. In August 2013 the Beaver Creek Fire and the Kelley Fire were both ignited by lightning and burned 111,490 acres (45,120 ha) and 17,346 acres (7,020 ha), respectively, of the Fairfield and Ketchum ranger districts. Another lightning-caused fire, the McCan Fire, burned 23,389 acres (9,465 ha) of the Fairfield Ranger District and other lands north of Fairfield in 2013. Both natural and prescribed fires are used as a tool to maintain desired vegetation and fuel levels. While the forest's fire plan operates within historical fire regimes, locally fire is actively suppressed to protect human life, investments, and resources.

The forest maintains a full-time fire staff throughout the summer, not only to control and extinguish fires that pose threats to people and structures but also to set controlled burns. Their jobs include maintaining a high level of preparedness, keeping a vigilant lookout for fire activity, responding to reports of fires, maintaining equipment, monitoring weather and relative atmospheric dryness, and preparing daily fire activity reports, which are used to post fire information for visitors and staff. The forest has wildland fire engines, pumps, hand tools and fire hose at its disposal. A helicopter can be summoned quickly, along with support from the South Central Idaho Interagency Dispatch Center, including a team of smokejumpers and air tankers used to provide air support in dropping flame retardant and water. There are small areas around Stanley and Mount Harrison where aerial retardant would not be used in the case of a fire. The 10-member Sawtooth Helitack crew was established in 1963 and is based at the SNRA headquarters 7 miles north of Ketchum. In the case of larger fires, the National Interagency Fire Command can quickly mobilize available resources. Only four of the original fire lookout towers remain standing in the forest, but they are no longer in use: Iron Mountain, Horton Peak, Lookout Mountain, and Mount Harrison, which was last fully staffed in 2007. Many of these towers were built by the Civilian Conservation Corps during the Great Depression.

== Geography and geology ==
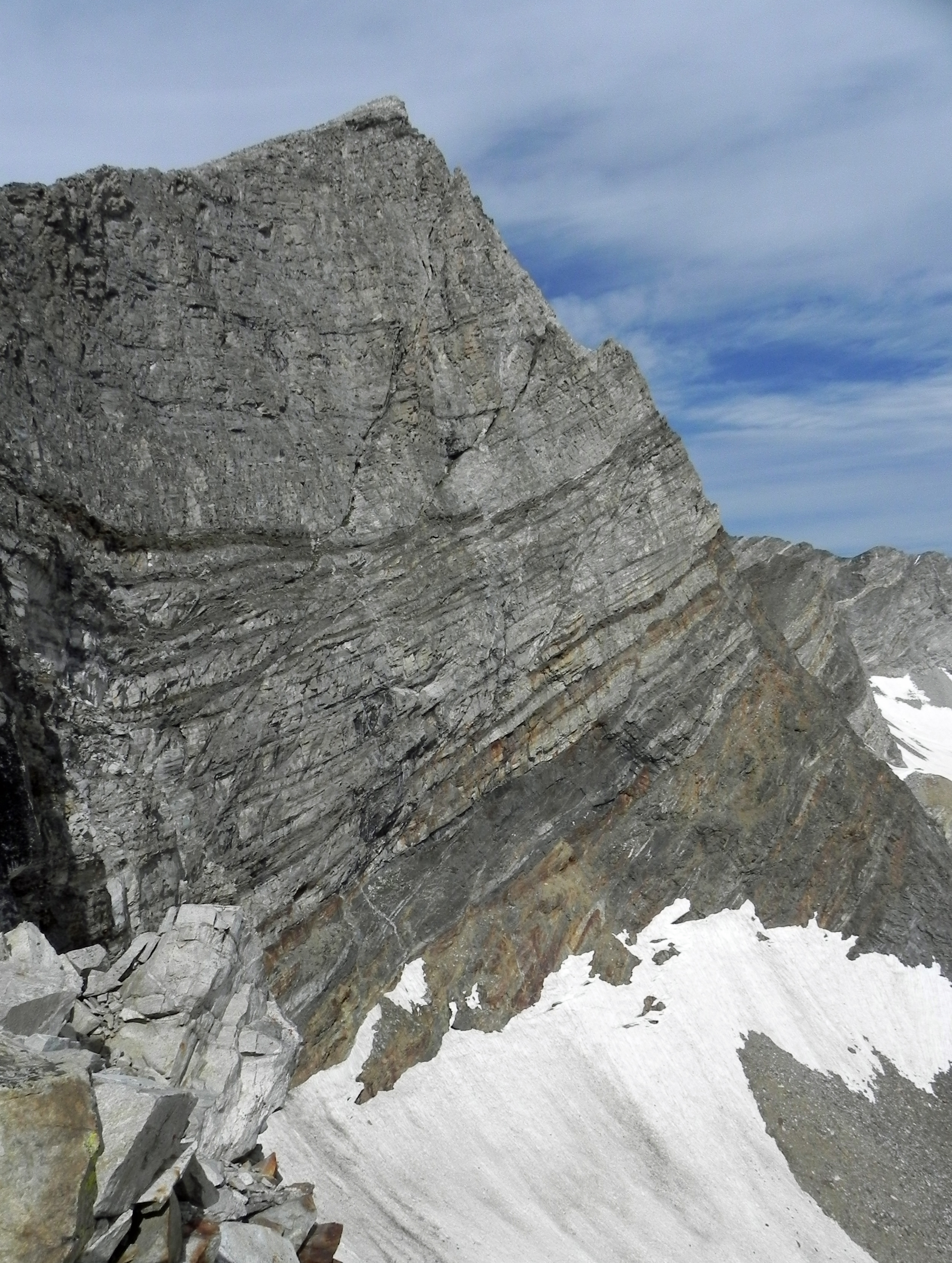
Hyndman Peak in the Pioneer Mountains is the forest's highest point

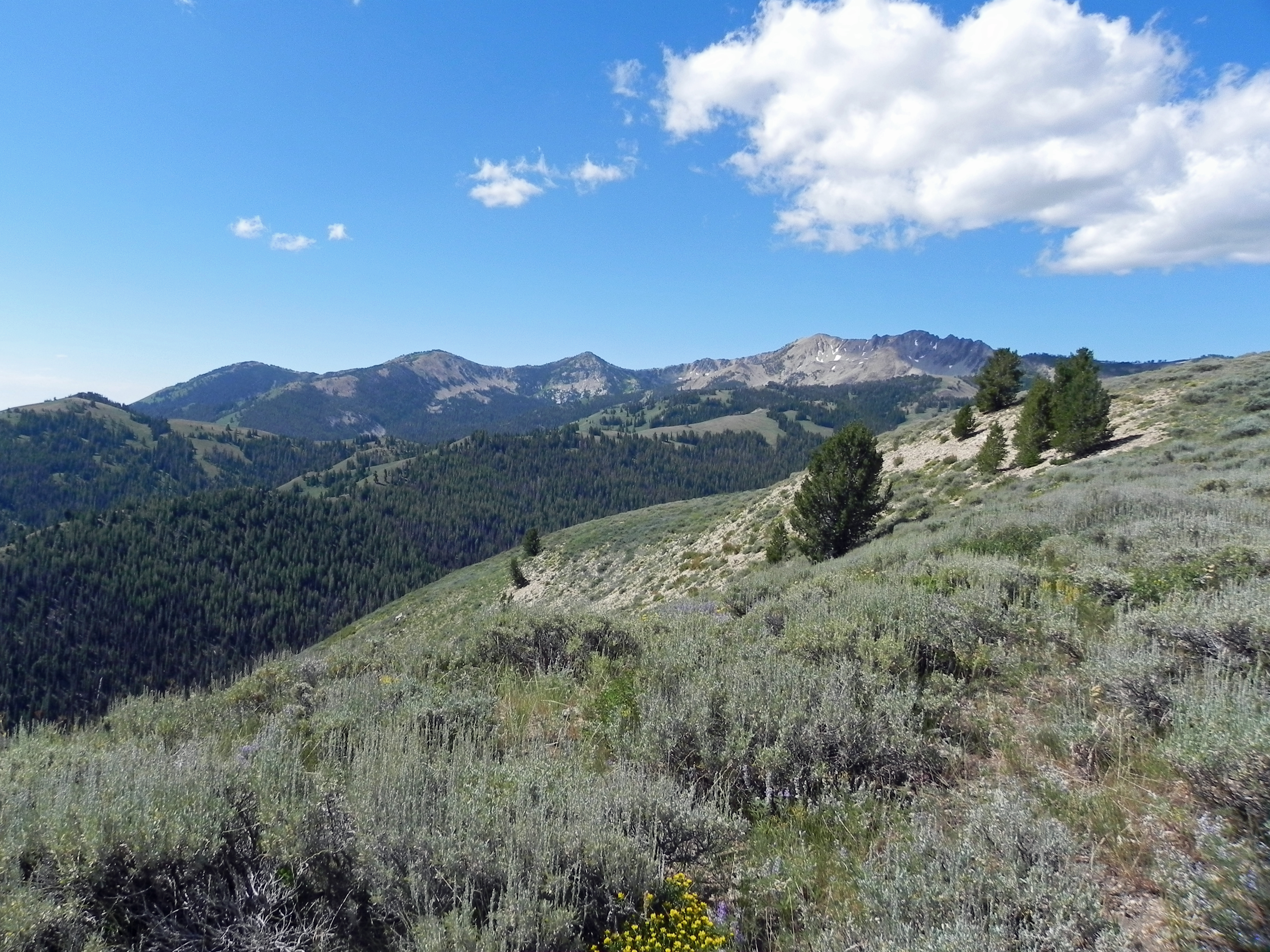
The Soldier Mountains

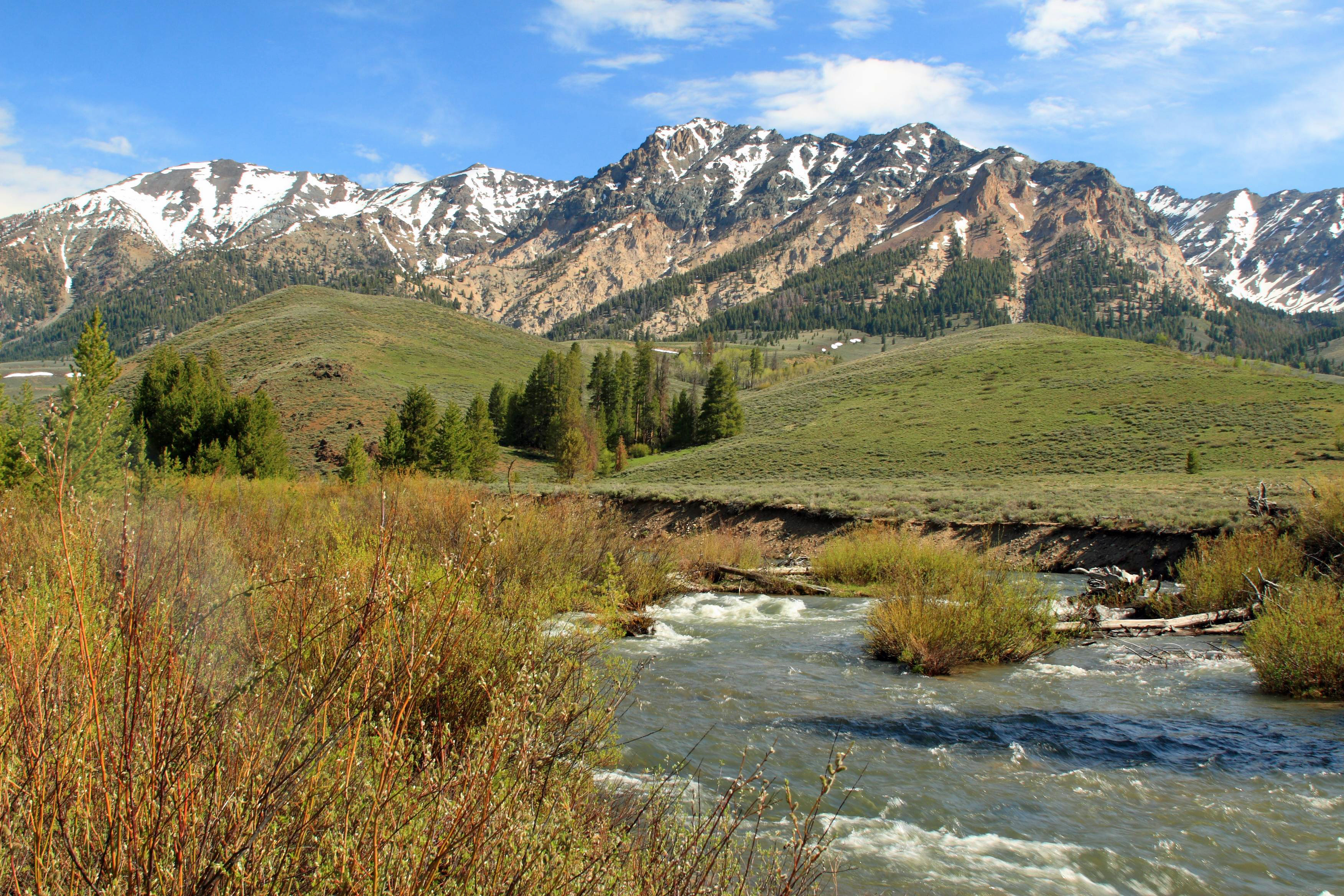
The Boulder Mountains and Big Wood River

The elevation in the forest ranges from 4,514 feet (1,376 m) at Rock Creek south of Twin Falls to 12,009 feet (3,660 m) above sea level at the top of Hyndman Peak, an elevation gain of 7,495 feet (2,284 m). The mountains of the Minidoka District are part of the Basin and Range Province, while those in the northern section of the forest are part of the Rocky Mountains. The Sawtooth Mountains have at least fifty peaks over ten thousand feet (3,050 m).

Mountain ranges of Sawtooth National Forest
Mountain Range	Highest point	Elevation	Location	Ranger District
Pioneer Mountains	Hyndman Peak	12,009 ft (3,660 m)	43.7494°N 114.1311°W	Ketchum
White Cloud Mountains	Castle Peak	11,815 ft (3,601 m)	44.0396°N 114.5853°W	SNRA
Boulder Mountains	Ryan Peak	11,714 ft (3,570 m)	43.9022°N 114.4094°W	SNRA
Sawtooth Mountains	Thompson Peak	10,751 ft (3,277 m)	44.1415°N 115.0100°W	SNRA
Smoky Mountains	Saviers Peak	10,441 ft (3,182 m)	43.8219°N 114.7130°W	Fairfield/Ketchum/SNRA
Albion Mountains	Cache Peak	10,339 ft (3,151 m)	42.1856°N 113.6611°W	Minidoka
Boise Mountains	Two Point Mountain	10,124 ft (3,086 m)	43.7371°N 114.9767°W	Fairfield
Soldier Mountains	Smoky Dome	10,095 ft (3,077 m)	43.4932°N 114.9362°W	Fairfield
Raft River Mountains	Bull Mountain	9,925 ft (3,025 m)	41.9048°N 113.3888°W	Minidoka
Black Pine Mountains	Black Pine Mtns HP	9,389 ft (2,862 m)	42.1386°N 113.1256°W	Minidoka
Sublett Mountains	Sublett Range HP	7,492 ft (2,284 m)	42.3699°N 112.9305°W	Minidoka

The mountains of Sawtooth National Forest have a varied geological history. The northern Sawtooth Mountains formed from the Eocene Sawtooth batholith, while south of Alturas Lake the Sawtooth, Smoky, and Soldier mountains formed from the Cretaceous granodiorite of the Idaho Batholith. Foothills of the Smoky Mountains are from the Pennsylvanian and Permian Dollarhide formations. The White Cloud Mountains are underlain by the gray granodiorite of the Idaho batholith, while some of the exposed rock is baked impure limestone from the Permian Grand Prize Formation.

The central mass of the Raft River Mountains consists of Precambrian metamorphic rocks with Elba quartzite and interlayered schist on the southern slopes and Cambrian quartzite outcrops on the western part of the range. Below the Sublett Mountains the Phosphoria Formation, a basal phosphorite overlain by a thick sequence of chert and cherty sandstone, reaches its greatest thickness. Soils in the northern part of the forest are generally deep and highly fertile in lowlands but shallow and less so on steep slopes. In the Minidoka Ranger District, soils are generally productive, derived from volcanic and sedimentary material, shallow on steep slopes, and deep in the lowlands.

The Boulder, Pioneer, Sawtooth, Smoky, and White Cloud mountains are generally jagged, while the ranges on the Minidoka District, the Albion, Black Pine, Raft River, and Sublett mountains, are generally smooth and rolling. Galena Summit is a mountain pass at 8,701 ft (2,652 m) on State Highway 75 between Stanley and Ketchum, roughly where the Boulder and Smoky Mountains meet. While not in Sawtooth National Forest, Banner Creek Summit is a 7,037-foot (2,145 m) mountain pass on State Highway 21 at the northern end of the Sawtooth Mountains, on the border of the Boise and Challis National Forests.

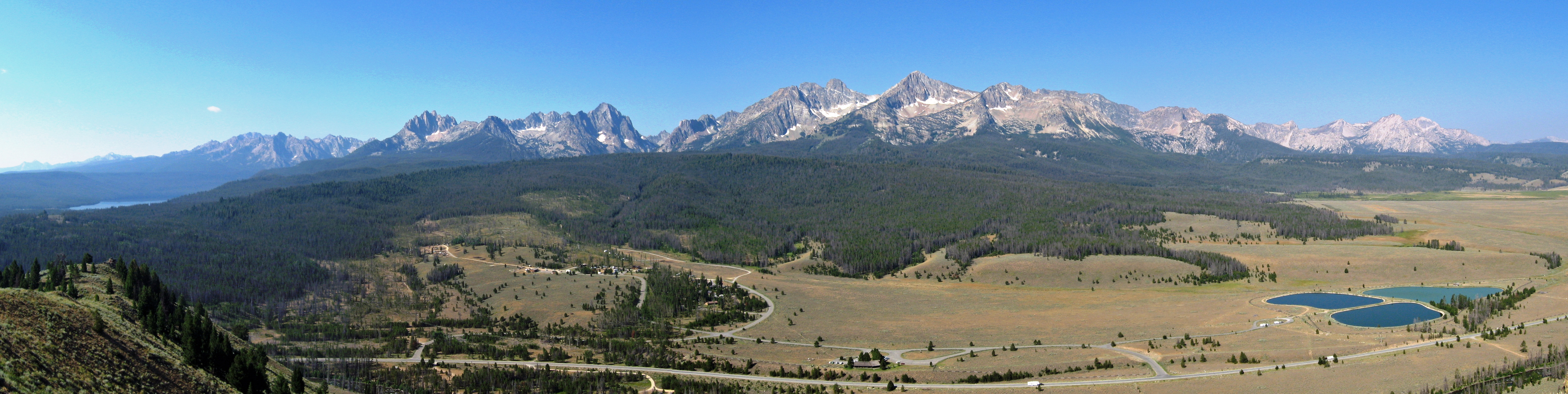
The Sawtooth Mountains from southeast of Stanley

=== Waterways ===
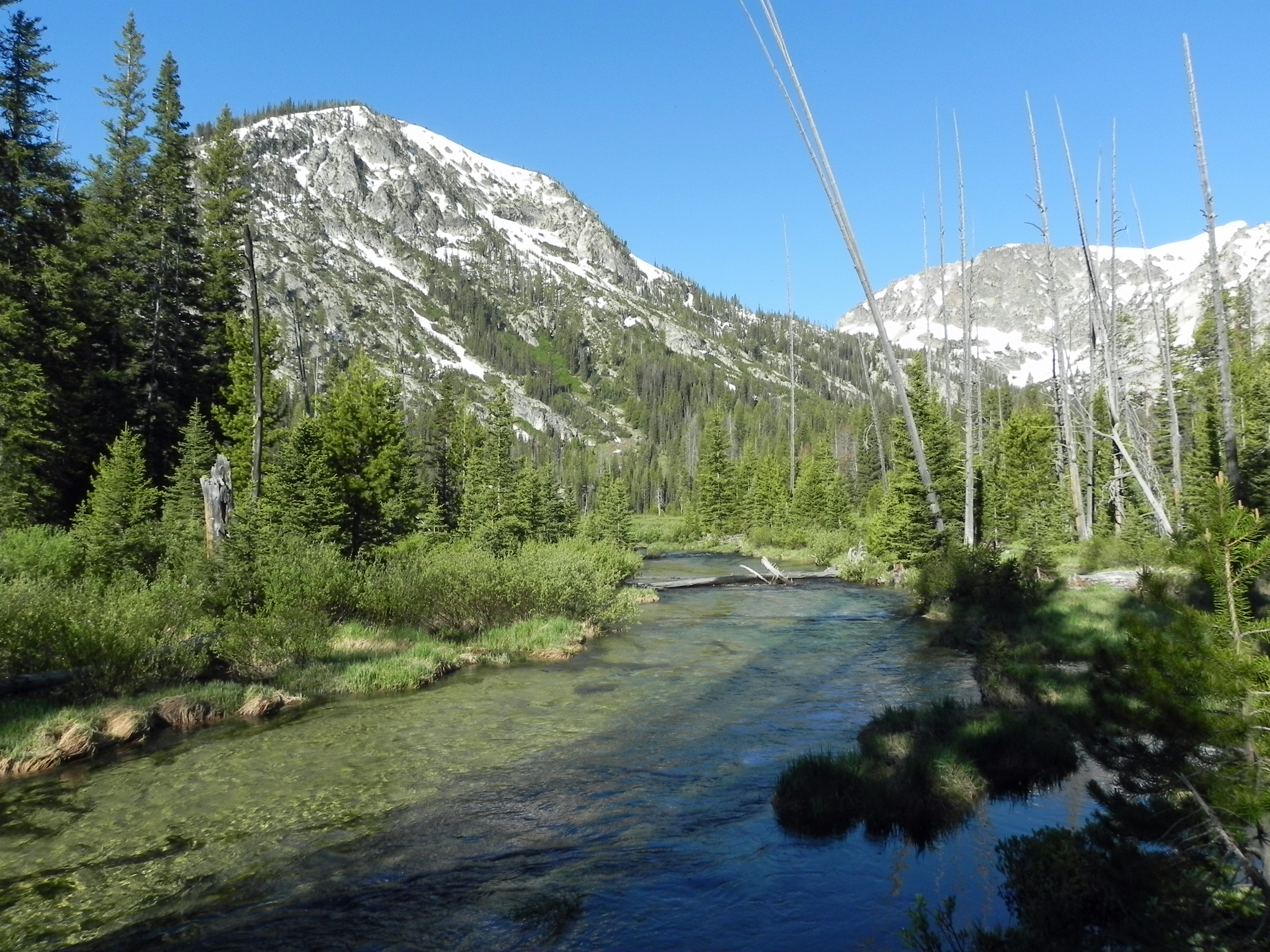
Iron Creek in the Sawtooth Mountains

There are over 1,100 lakes covering 7,600 acres (11.9 sq mi; 30.8 km^{2}) and an estimated 7,500 miles (12,100 km) of temporary and permanent streams and rivers in the forest. Over 680 miles (1,095 km) of streams are found in the Fairfield District, over 500 miles (800 km) in the Ketchum District, and over 450 miles (725 km) in the Minidoka District. The entire northern portion of the forest is in the watershed of the Snake River, a tributary of the Columbia River. The Salmon River's headwaters are in the upper Sawtooth Valley, and this river drains much of the SNRA and follows a tortuous, overall northwesterly course before flowing into the Snake River 425 mi (685 km) downstream. The western side of the Sawtooth Mountains is drained by the South Fork of the Payette River. The northern Soldier Mountains, southern Smoky Mountains, and much of the Fairfield District are drained by the South Fork of the Boise River, which flows into Anderson Ranch Reservoir just west of the forest. The Ketchum District, part of the SNRA, and the southern slopes of the Fairfield District are drained by the Big Wood River. Much of the Minidoka District is also drained by the Snake River via the Raft River and other tributaries, but portions of the Black Pine and Raft River Mountains drain into the Great Salt Lake. The annual water yield from the forest is estimated just below 2,300,000 acre-foot (2.8×10^{9} m^{3}).

Most of the forest's lakes are the result of glaciation and occur in the SNRA in the Sawtooth and White Cloud Mountains, but lakes can be found in most of the other mountain ranges of the forest. There are over 20 lakes in the Fairfield District, 90 in the Ketchum District, and 6 lakes and 3 reservoirs in the Minidoka District. The largest lake on the forest is Redfish Lake, a moraine-dammed lake that is 4.5 mi (7.2 km) long, 0.72 mi (1.16 km) wide, and up to 387 ft (118 m) deep. Other large lakes include Alturas, Pettit, Sawtooth, Stanley, and Yellow Belly lakes.

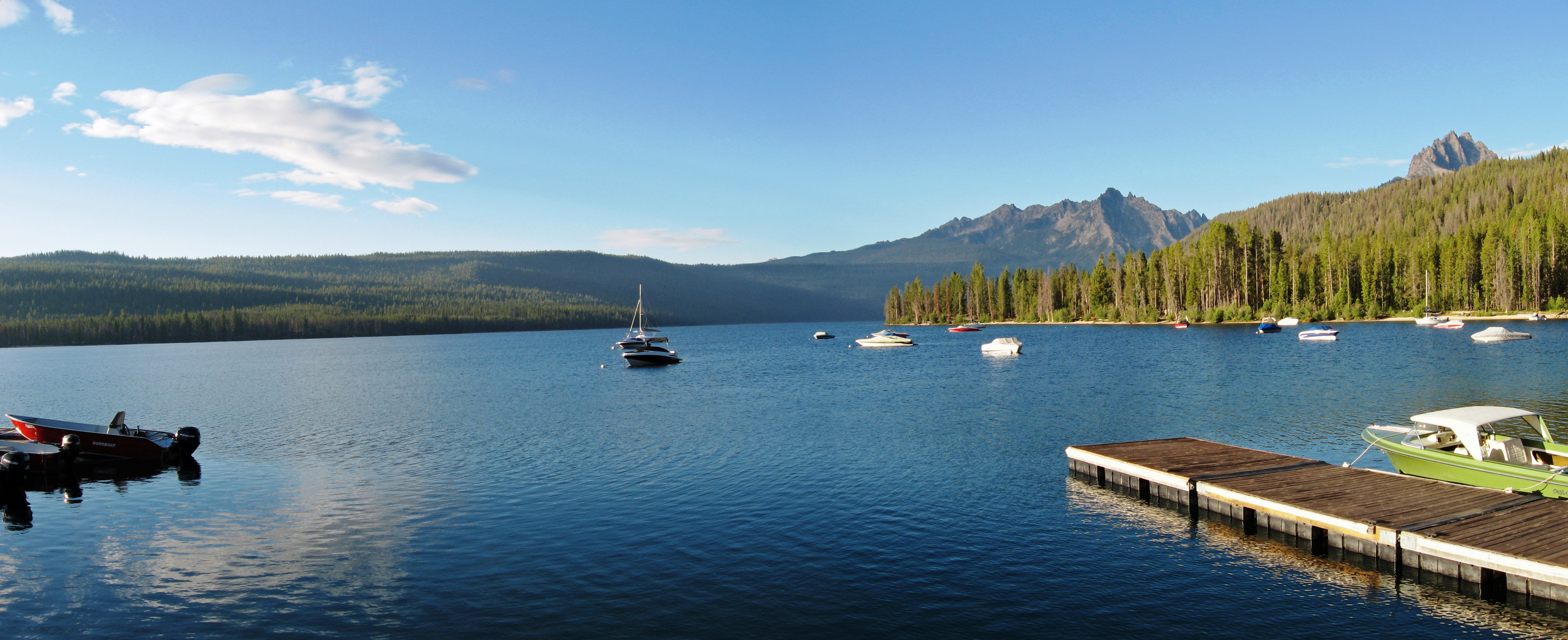
Redfish Lake and the Sawtooth Mountains

=== Seismology ===
The Sawtooth Fault is a 40-mile (65 km) long east-dipping normal fault that runs along the base of the Sawtooth Mountains and was discovered and mapped in 2010. It is believed to be capable of producing an earthquake measuring up to 7.5 on the Richter magnitude scale.

The most recent earthquake, measuring M5+, occurred on March 31, 2020, and measured 6.5 on the moment magnitude scale and had a maximum Mercalli intensity of VII (Very strong). The quake has had numerous aftershocks of 2.5 or greater. The aftershocks have continued through early August 2020.

- See 2020 Central Idaho earthquake
- See Borah Peak: 1983 earthquake

=== Glaciology ===
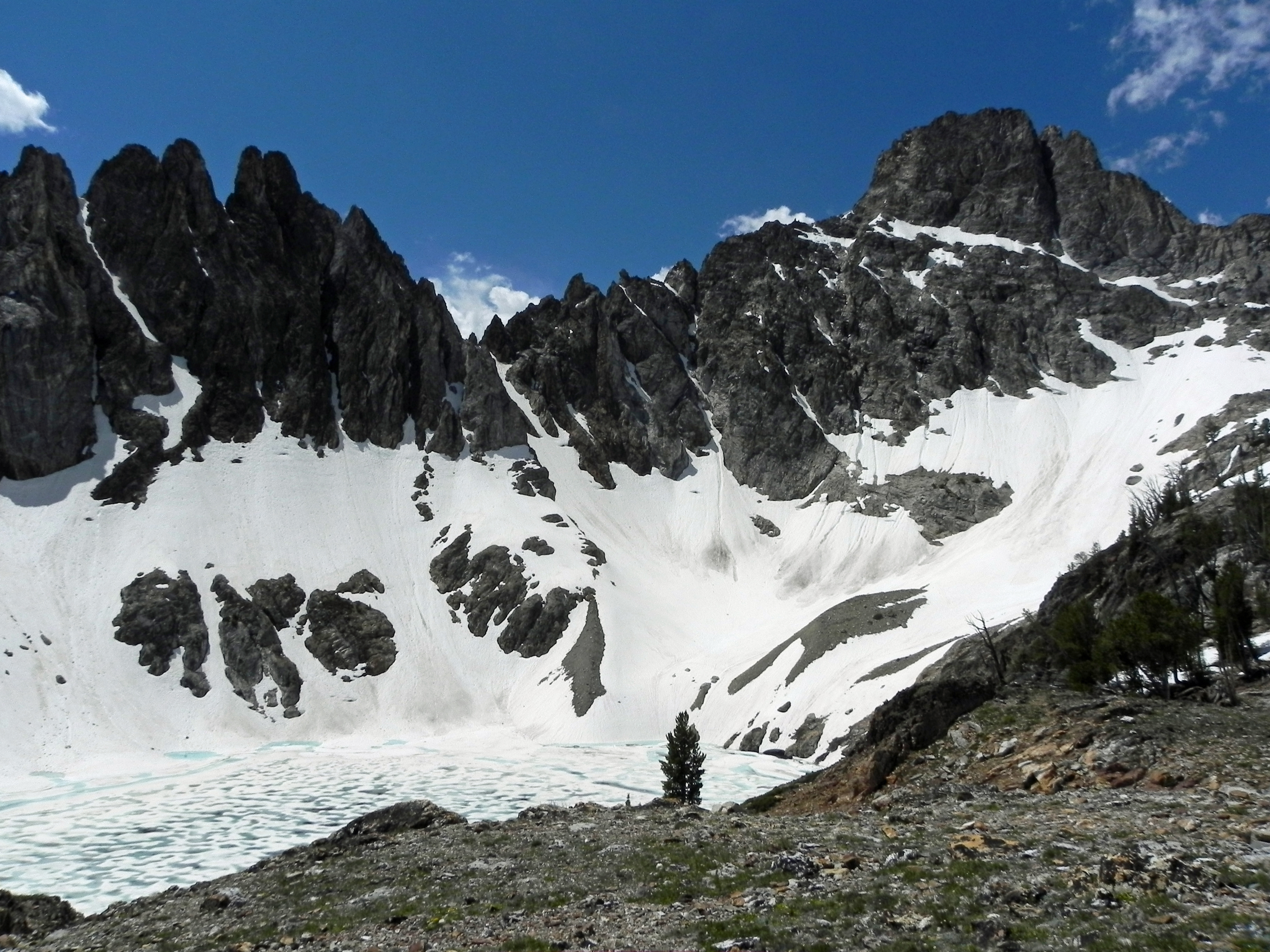
Thompson Peak has an unnamed glacial lake in the cirque just northeast of its peak

Sawtooth National Forest has a history of alpine glaciation that is most obvious in the Sawtooth Mountains, and while no surface glaciers exist today, perennial snow fields and rock glaciers remain, usually on north or east facing slopes. There have been 202 perennial snow fields mapped in the Sawtooth Mountains, and while none have been mapped elsewhere on the forest, some may still exist in the Boulder, Pioneer, and White Cloud Mountains.

The Sawtooth Mountains were last extensively glaciated in the Pleistocene, but glaciers probably existed during the Little Ice Age, which ended around 1850 AD. Evidence of past glaciation is abundant in the Sawtooth, White Cloud, Boulder, and Smoky mountains, as well as the north and east-facing slopes of the Albion, Raft River, and Soldier mountains. Remnants of the glaciers include glacial lakes, moraines, horns, hanging valleys, cirques, and arêtes.

== Climate ==
Much of Sawtooth National Forest receives less than 15 inches (38 cm) of precipitation a year, with higher elevations typically receiving more precipitation. Summer and early fall are usually drier than winter in most of the forest, while in the lowlands of the Minidoka District, such as near Oakley, the spring may be the wettest season. Winter snowfall provides a steady water supply to the streams during the summer. Locally, climate may depend on mountains that block moist air and river valleys that can funnel weather systems. Dry lightning is common in summer and fall. The growing season ranges from 150 days in the lower valleys to less than 30 days in the highest alpine areas. The climate charts below are ordered (left to right) from highest to lowest in both latitude and elevation.

Stanley, Idaho

Climate chart (precipitation, max. and min. temperature)
J	F	M	A	M	J	J	A	S	O	N	D
1.6 26 −1	1.3 33 0	1.1 42 9	1.1 50 20	1.3 60 28	1.2 68 33	0.6 79 36	0.6 78 33	0.8 69 27	1 56 21	1.5 39 12	1.6 26 −1
- █ Average max. and min. temperatures in °F
- █ Precipitation totals in inches
- Source: NOAA,
Metric conversion
J	F	M	A	M	J	J	A	S	O	N	D
41 −3 −18	33 1 −18	29 5 −13	28 10 −7	32 15 −2	30 20 1	15 26 2	15 25 0	19 20 −3	25 14 −6	39 4 −11	40 −3 −18
- █ Average max. and min. temperatures in °C
- █ Precipitation totals in mm

Ketchum, Idaho

Climate chart (precipitation, max. and min. temperature)
J	F	M	A	M	J	J	A	S	O	N	D
2.2 31 6	2 36 8	1.9 43 17	1.2 53 25	1.9 62 32	1.3 71 38	0.9 80 43	0.8 79 41	1.1 70 34	1.1 58 26	1.7 41 15	2.5 32 7
- █ Average max. and min. temperatures in °F
- █ Precipitation totals in inches
- Source: NOAA,
Metric conversion
J	F	M	A	M	J	J	A	S	O	N	D
56 0 −15	50 2 −13	47 6 −9	31 12 −4	48 17 0	34 22 3	22 27 6	19 26 5	28 21 1	27 15 −4	43 5 −9	64 0 −14
- █ Average max. and min. temperatures in °C
- █ Precipitation totals in mm

Fairfield, Idaho

Climate chart (precipitation, max. and min. temperature)
J	F	M	A	M	J	J	A	S	O	N	D
2.4 29 5	1.7 34 8	1.3 42 17	1.1 55 27	1.3 66 35	0.9 75 40	0.5 86 46	0.4 84 44	0.6 75 35	0.8 63 27	1.8 44 18	2.3 32 8
- █ Average max. and min. temperatures in °F
- █ Precipitation totals in inches
- Source: NOAA,
Metric conversion
J	F	M	A	M	J	J	A	S	O	N	D
60 −2 −15	43 1 −13	32 6 −9	27 13 −3	33 19 2	24 24 5	12 30 8	11 29 7	16 24 2	20 17 −3	46 7 −8	58 0 −13
- █ Average max. and min. temperatures in °C
- █ Precipitation totals in mm

Oakley, Idaho

Climate chart (precipitation, max. and min. temperature)
J	F	M	A	M	J	J	A	S	O	N	D
0.8 38 19	0.7 43 23	0.9 51 28	1.3 60 33	1.6 68 40	1.2 77 47	0.7 86 55	0.8 85 53	0.8 76 45	0.8 65 36	0.8 49 27	0.8 40 21
- █ Average max. and min. temperatures in °F
- █ Precipitation totals in inches
- Source: NOAA,
Metric conversion
J	F	M	A	M	J	J	A	S	O	N	D
20 3 −7	17 6 −5	23 10 −2	32 15 1	40 20 5	31 25 8	19 30 13	19 30 12	19 24 7	21 18 2	20 9 −3	21 4 −6
- █ Average max. and min. temperatures in °C
- █ Precipitation totals in mm

== Human history ==
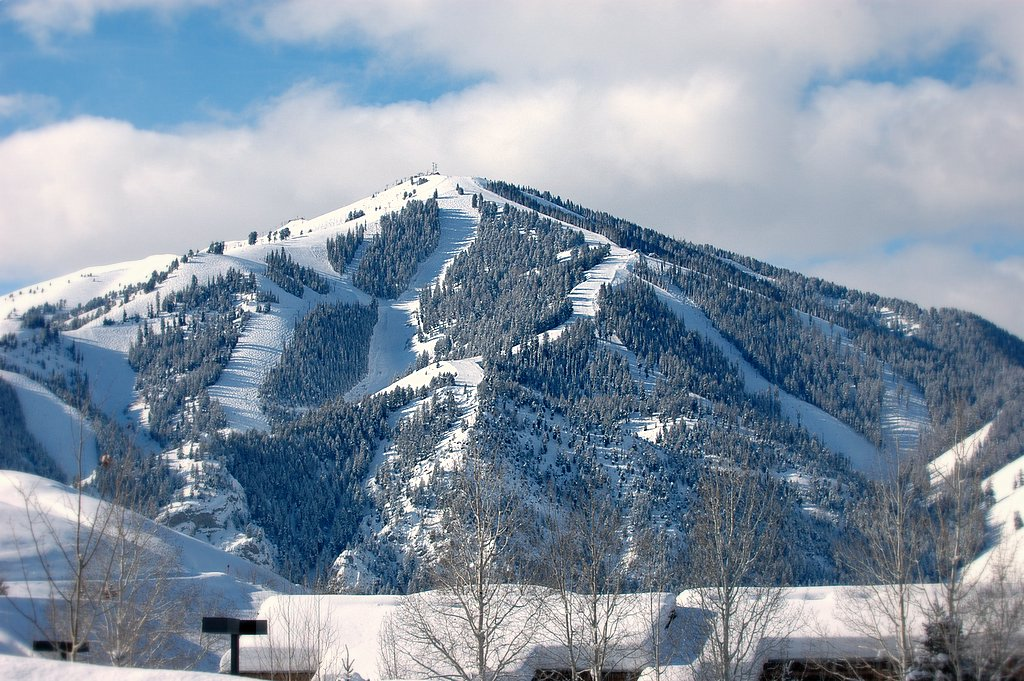
Bald Mountain Ski Area

Spear points dating to 12,000 years ago document the earliest presence of Paleo-Indians in the area, and there are nearly 1,500 known heritage sites in the forest. After AD 1700, the Shoshone, also known as the Sheepeater people, as well as the Bannock and Northern Paiute tribes, harvested fish, game, roots, timber, tubers, and rocks for tools while living in small groups at the northern end of the forest.

Trappers and explorers arrived in southern Idaho in the early 19th century. They established immigrant trails in the region by 1849, including the Oregon and California trails. The forest was used by early settlers primarily for extractive industries. Fur trappers of the Hudson's Bay Company discovered the Stanley Basin in the northern part of the forest in the 1820s, but mostly avoided it due to the scarcity of beaver. For early settlers, the welfare of their community was dependent upon timber supply, regulation of stream flow for irrigation, and use of the land for cattle range. Mining began in the 1860s, peaked in the 1880s, and fluctuated over the following century with the extraction of gold, silver, lead, and zinc. The Black Pine Division of the forest was explored in the late 1800s, and the Tallman Mine began producing gold in the 1920s with production peaking from 1949 to 1954. The Black Pine Mine again produced gold from 1992 through November 1997, when the mine's parent company, Pegasus Gold, declared bankruptcy. The location of the mine has since been reclaimed.

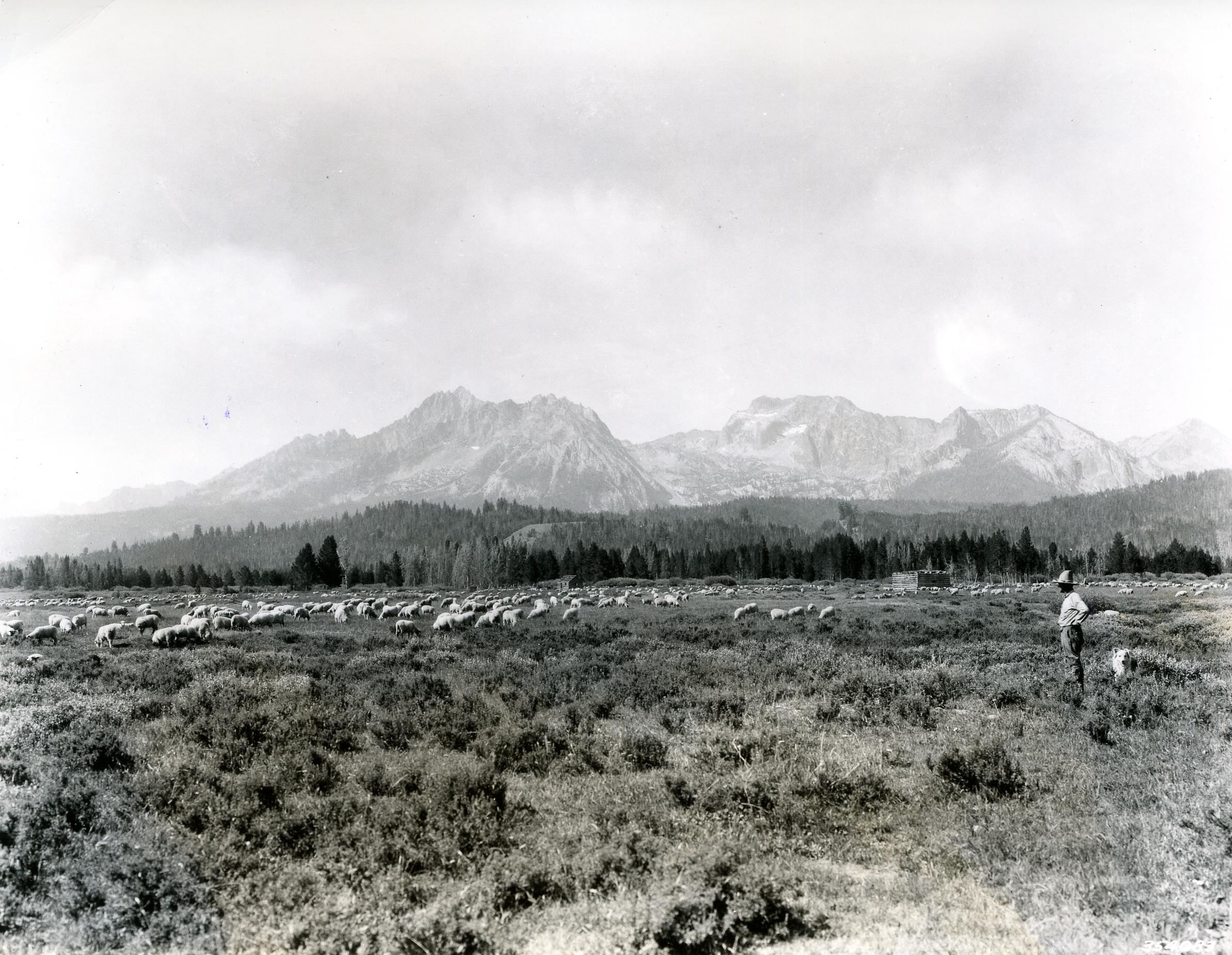
Sheep grazing near Stanley c. 1937

Towns around the forest, including Stanley, Ketchum, and Sawtooth City, were founded as mining towns in the latter part of the 19th century by prospectors and trappers, including Civil War veteran Captain John Stanley, after whom the town of Stanley is named. Ketchum is named after the trapper and guide David Ketchum, while the Sublett Mountains are named after trapper William Sublette, who lived in the area in the 1830s. Most of the logging in the region was for firewood and timber for miners and homesteaders. For much of the 20th century, sheep and cattle grazing were the primary large-scale land uses of the forest. Sheep drives were common in the Wood River Valley after the mining boom and shepherds from southern Idaho drove their flocks north to graze the upper elevation areas in Sawtooth National Forest. The original sheepherders were Basque Americans, while today many of the sheepherders are Peruvians contracted through the Department of Labor.

In 1936 the Union Pacific Railroad and its chairman W. Averell Harriman developed Sun Valley and the Bald Mountain ski area—the first winter-destination resort in the United States developed for the purpose of increasing railroad passenger numbers. The area became popular with celebrities, including Ernest Hemingway and Gary Cooper. On July 2, 1961, Hemingway committed suicide at his home overlooking the Big Wood River; he is buried at the Ketchum Cemetery.

On February 9, 1945, a B-24 Liberator bomber crashed on Mount Harrison in the Albion Division of the forest during a training mission in dense fog. All nine crew were killed in the crash, and their bodies were found inside the plane and recovered over the following days. The plane's remains have never been removed. A memorial service was held on July 29, 2004, and a plaque was permanently installed honoring those who died.

== Recreation ==
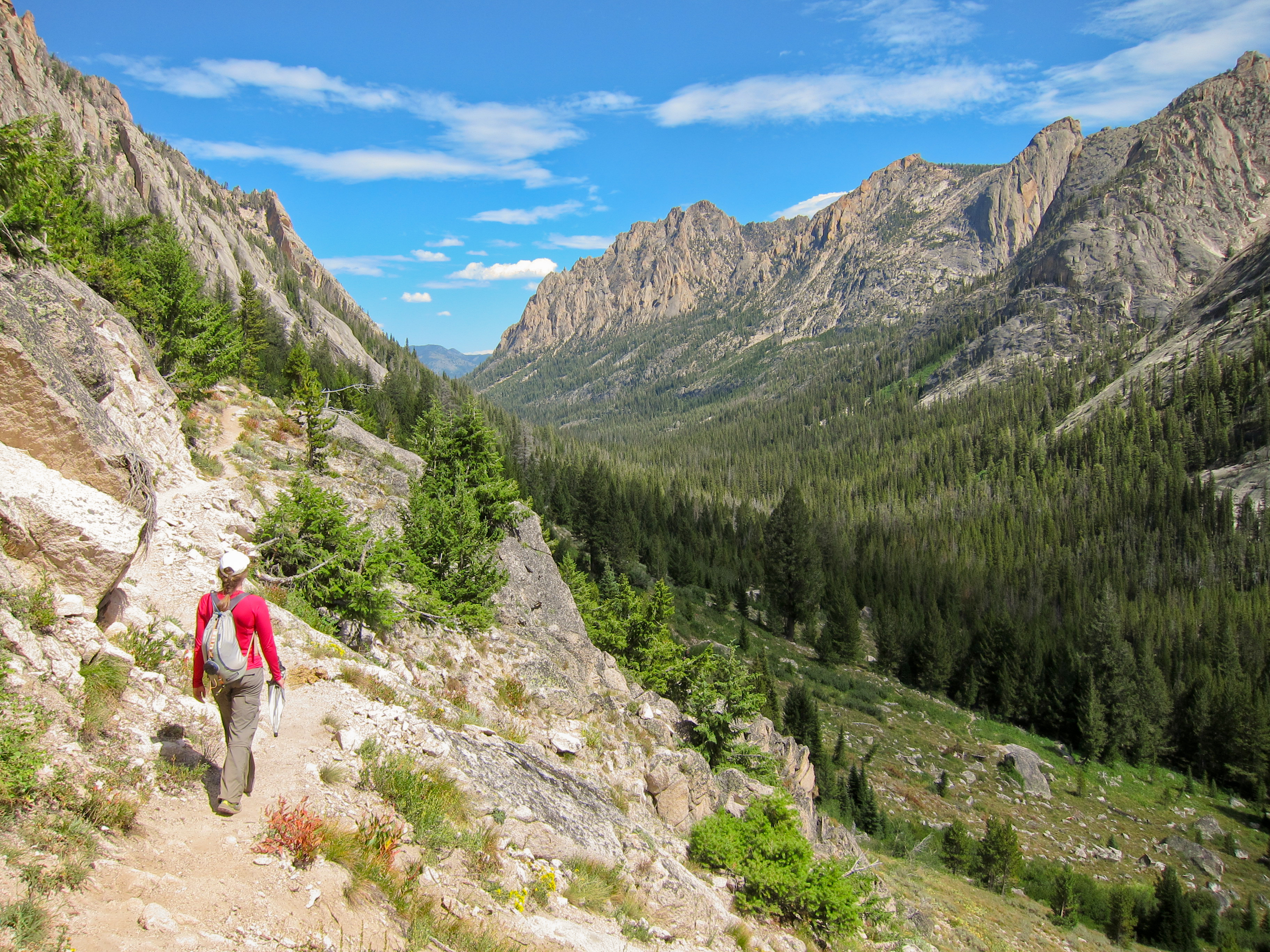
Hiking in the Sawtooth Wilderness

Sawtooth National Forest receives over one million visitors a year. Two visitor centers, one at the SNRA headquarters north of Ketchum and one at Redfish Lake, provide orientation, books, maps, and interpretive displays and are staffed by either forest service interpreters or volunteers. The forest's ranger stations also provide these services, but without interpretive displays. Along the roadways, exhibits showcase key parts of the forest, and there are plentiful day use and picnic areas. There are more than 81 campgrounds in the forest, with 12 in the Fairfield District, 6 in the Ketchum District, 25 in the Minidoka District, and 38 in the SNRA. Most of the campgrounds are on a first come first served basis, while some can be reserved.

Visiting distant backcountry areas requires accessing hiking trails and then backpacking or horseback riding into remote destinations. Free permits are required for use of the wilderness and can be obtained at trailheads. Group size is restricted in the wilderness, open fires are not permitted in some high-use areas, and visitors are expected to follow Leave No Trace practices. There are abundant trails throughout the forest, with over 700 miles (1,100 km) in the SNRA, 440 miles (710 km) in the Fairfield District, and 341 miles (549 km) in the Minidoka District. Two National Recreation Trails are found on the forest, the Fishhook Creek Boardwalk at Redfish Lake and the Wood River Nature Trail at the Wood River Campground.

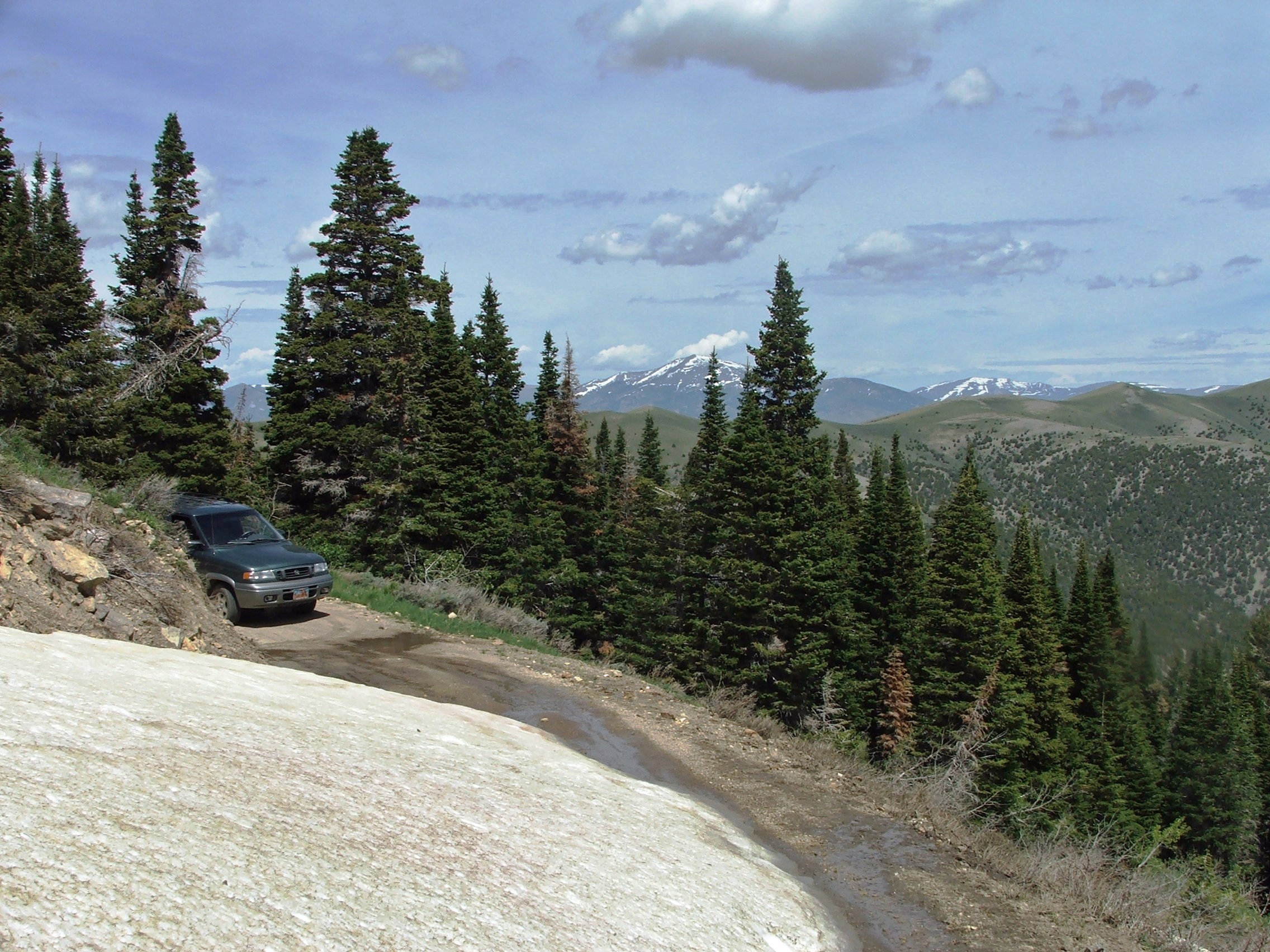
Driving in the Raft River Mountains

All-terrain vehicles are allowed on over 500 mi (800 km) of forest roads and some trails, but access may be restricted depending on season and environmental conditions. The Sun Valley area has an extensive network of mountain biking trails. Hunting and fishing are popular recreational activities permitted throughout the forest, provided that proper permits are obtained and the applicable rules and regulations are followed. Hunting and fishing licenses are available from the state of Idaho through the Idaho Department of Fish and Game.

The SNRA is the primary destination for mountain climbers and rock climbers within the forest. Thompson Peak and Hyndman Peak are two popular peaks to hike to, and Mount Heyburn is a popular rock climbing destination. Opportunities for rafting and kayaking on the upper Salmon River with conditions range from flatwater to class IV whitewater. Water levels are highest during snowmelt in spring and early summer. The large lakes in the Sawtooth Valley, including Redfish, Alturas, Pettit, and Stanley lakes, have developed boat accesses. Redfish Lake has a lodge with a marina, restaurant, and various activities. There are numerous hot springs distributed across the forest and open to public use. A few have developed tubs, including those in the Baumgartner Campground.

=== Winter activities ===
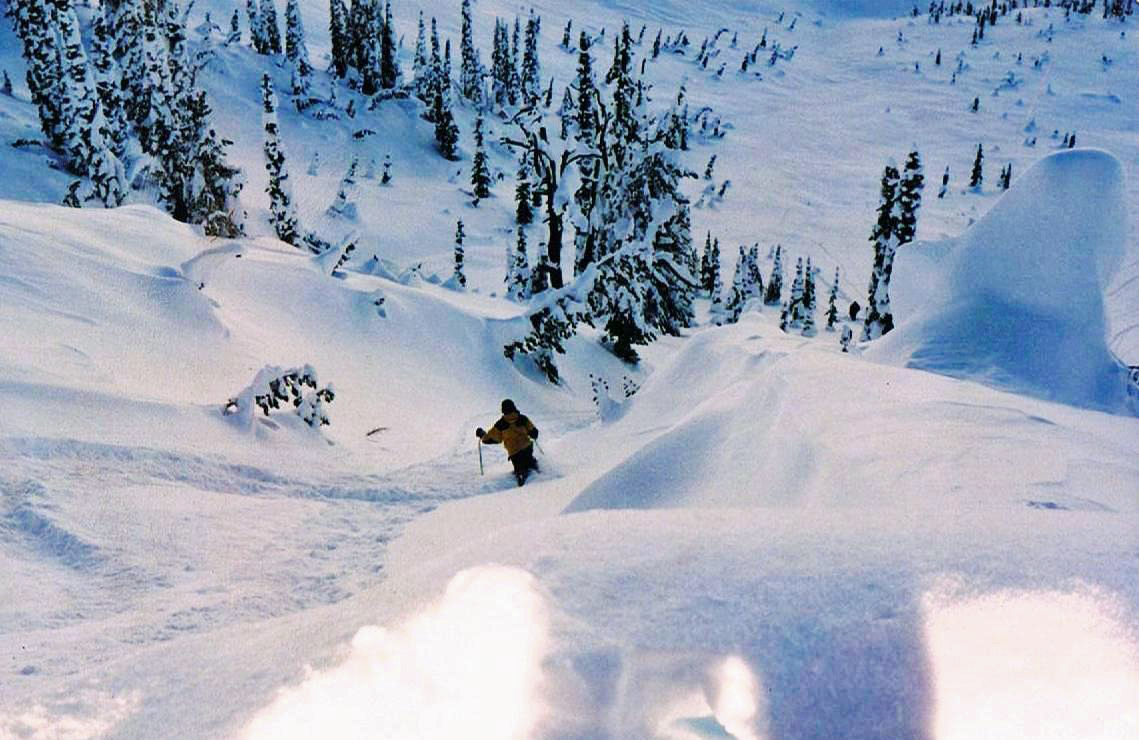
Skiing in the Sawtooth Mountains

Winter activities include downhill skiing, cross-country skiing, snowshoeing, and snowmobiling. The first destination winter resort in the U.S. was developed at Sun Valley in 1936 with ski slopes on Bald Mountain and Dollar Mountain. There are four ski areas in Sawtooth National Forest as well as the Rotarun Ski Area just west of Hailey and Dollar Mountain in Sun Valley, but these are just outside the forest's boundary. There are snowshoe loops and 78 mi (126 km) of groomed Nordic ski trails around Galena Lodge in the SNRA. Sno-Cat and heliskiing opportunities also exist in the forest. Over 50 mi (80 km) of groomed snowmobile trails and warming huts are found in the Fairfield District, and there are 30 mi (48 km) in the Cassia Division. Backcountry hut and yurt accommodations are available in the Sawtooth National Forest for overnight trips for winter recreationalists.

Ski areas of Sawtooth National Forest
Ski area	Top elevation	Vertical drop	Lifts	Runs	Snowfall	Location	Mountain range	District
Bald Mountain	9,150 ft (2,790 m)	3,400 ft (1,000 m)	14	75	220 in (560 cm)	43.655°N 114.409°W	Smoky	Ketchum
Magic Mountain	7,240 ft (2,210 m)	700 ft (210 m)	3	11	230 in (580 cm)	42.188°N 114.286°W	South Hills	Minidoka
Pomerelle	8,762 ft (2,671 m)	1,002 ft (305 m)	3	24	500 in (1,300 cm)	42.318°N 113.608°W	Albion	Minidoka
Soldier Mountain	7,177 ft (2,188 m)	1,425 ft (434 m)	3	36	100 in (250 cm)	43.483°N 114.833°W	Soldier	Fairfield

=== Scenic roads ===
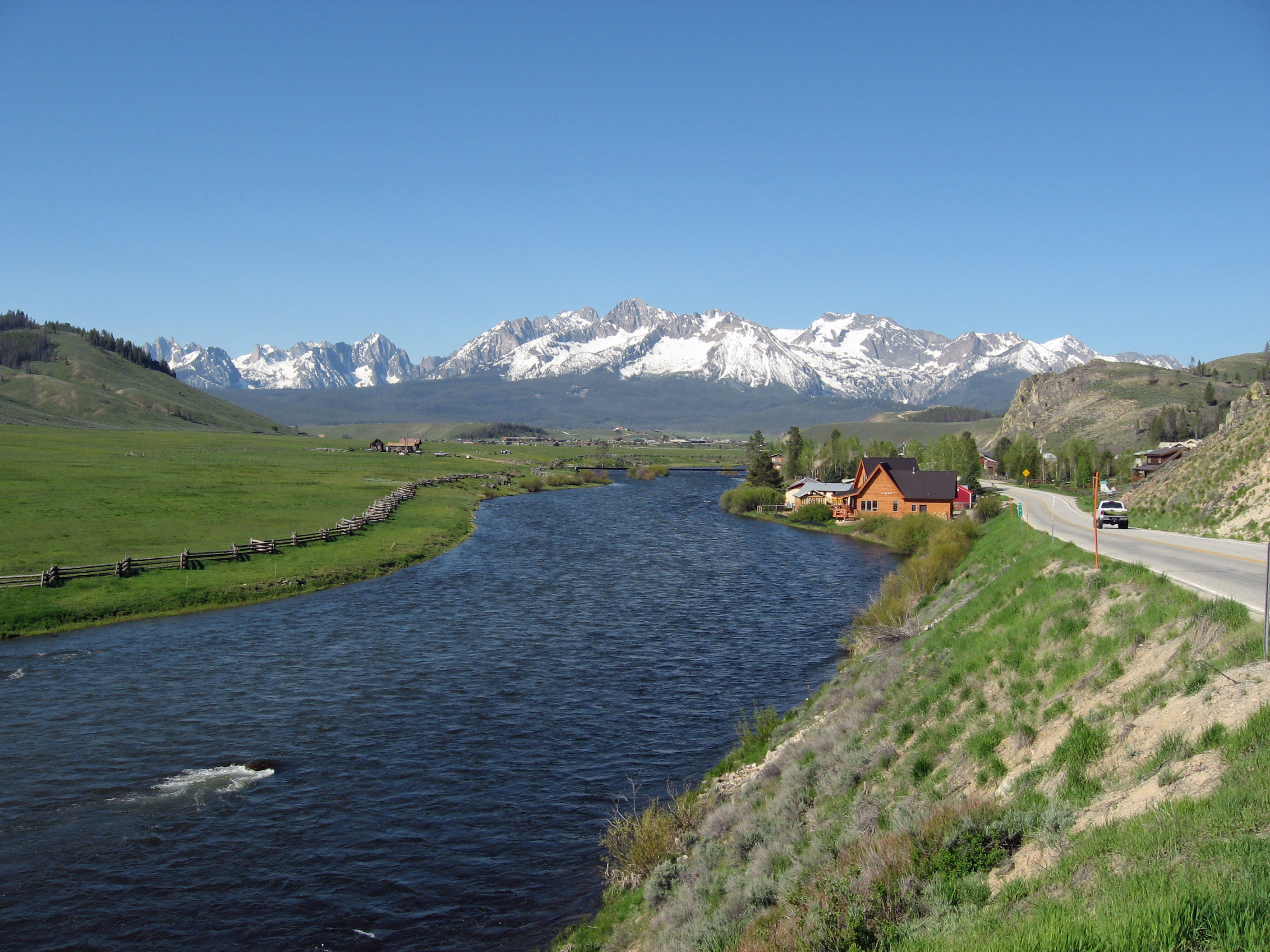
The Salmon River and Sawtooth Mountains along Idaho State Highway 75 approaching Stanley

Sawtooth National Forest is home to four of Idaho's scenic byways, three of which intersect in Stanley. Idaho State Highway 75 is designated as the Sawtooth Scenic Byway for 115.7 mi (186.2 km) from Shoshone north to Stanley. Highway 75 from Stanley to Challis and U.S. Route 93 from Challis north to the Montana border are designated as the Salmon River Scenic Byway for 161.7 mi (260.2 km). Idaho State Highway 21 is the Ponderosa Pine Scenic Byway for 130.9 mi (210.7 km) from Stanley to Boise. The City of Rocks Backcountry Byway follows a series of roads for 49 mi (79 km) around the Albion Mountains and through the City of Rocks National Reserve at the southern end of the Albion Mountains.

== Popular culture ==
Movies, television shows, and documentaries have been filmed in and around Sawtooth National Forest, particularly around the Sun Valley area. Movies filmed in Sun Valley include I Met Him in Paris (1937), Sun Valley Serenade (1941), and Bus Stop (1956). Clint Eastwood's 1985 film Pale Rider was filmed in the SNRA, mostly in the Boulder Mountains in late 1984. The opening credits scene was shot south of Stanley in front of the Sawtooth Mountains. The SNRA was one of the settings of the 2010 3-D computer-animated film Alpha and Omega.

Beginning in 1986 Idaho license plates depicted a basic mountain range that was supposed to represent the Sawtooths; in 1991 the plates were revised to more accurately represent the mountains. The Idaho Division of Motor Vehicles also created a license plate depicting the SNRA.

== See also ==
- List of national forests of the United States
