= Magic Mountain Resort =

Ski area in Idaho, United States

Magic Mountain
- Location in Idaho Magic Mountain (the United States)
- Location: Sawtooth National Forest; Twin Falls Co., Idaho, U.S.
- Nearest city: Rogerson; Twin Falls
- Coordinates: 42°11′17.9″N 114°17′10.0″W
- Vertical: 700 ft (213 m)
- Top elevation: 7,240 ft (2,207 m)
- Base elevation: 6,540 ft (1,993 m)
- Skiable area: 120 acres (0.49 km^{2})
- Trails: 11
- Longest run: 1 mile (1.6 km)
- Lift system: 1 double chair 1 poma lift 1 rope tow
- Snowfall: 230 inches (580 cm)
- Snowmaking: none
- Night skiing: none
- Website: Magic Mountain

Magic Mountain Resort is a modest alpine ski area in south central Idaho, in a southern unit of the Sawtooth National Forest. It is east of Rogerson on the eastern edge of Twin Falls County, 18 miles (29 km) northwest of the Nevada-Utah border with Idaho.

The ski area has a summit elevation of 7,240 feet (2,207 m) above sea level with a vertical drop of 700 feet (213 m). It has a double chairlift, a poma lift, and a rope tow. The 120 acres (49 ha) of skiable terrain is rated at 30% easiest, 25% more difficult, 20% most difficult, and 25% experts only. Magic Mountain also has a snow tubing hill.

The average annual snowfall is 230 inches (19 ft; 580 cm). Outside of holidays, the ski area is open four days a week, Thursday through Sunday, and does not have night skiing. The area has been operating for over 76 years.
