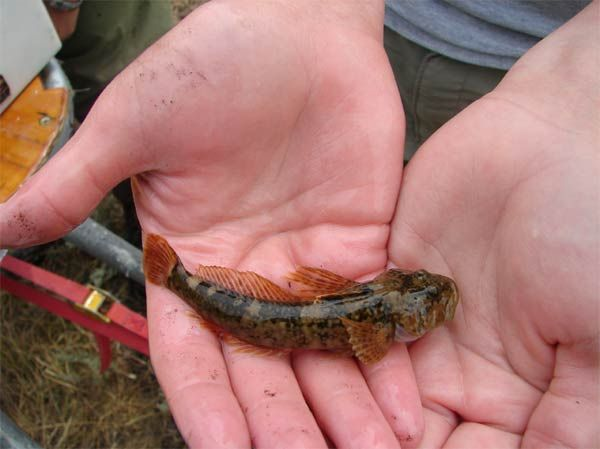

Conservation status
- Near Threatened (IUCN 3.1)

Scientific classification
- Kingdom: Animalia
- Phylum: Chordata
- Class: Actinopterygii
- Order: Perciformes
- Suborder: Cottoidei
- Family: Cottidae
- Genus: Cottus
- Species: C. leiopomus

Binomial name
- Cottus leiopomus C. H. Gilbert & Evermann, 1894

= Wood River sculpin =

Species of fish

The Wood River sculpin (Cottus leiopomus) is a species of freshwater ray-finned fish belonging to the family Cottidae, the typical sculpins. It is endemic to the Big Wood and Little Wood rivers and their tributaries upstream of Magic Reservoir in Blaine County, Idaho in the United States. Its habitat is similar to other sculpins: small to medium-sized streams that are cool and have swift currents. It is a species of concern because of its restricted distribution.
