= City of Rocks National Reserve =

Protected natural area in Idaho, United States

- IUCN category V (protected landscape/seascape)
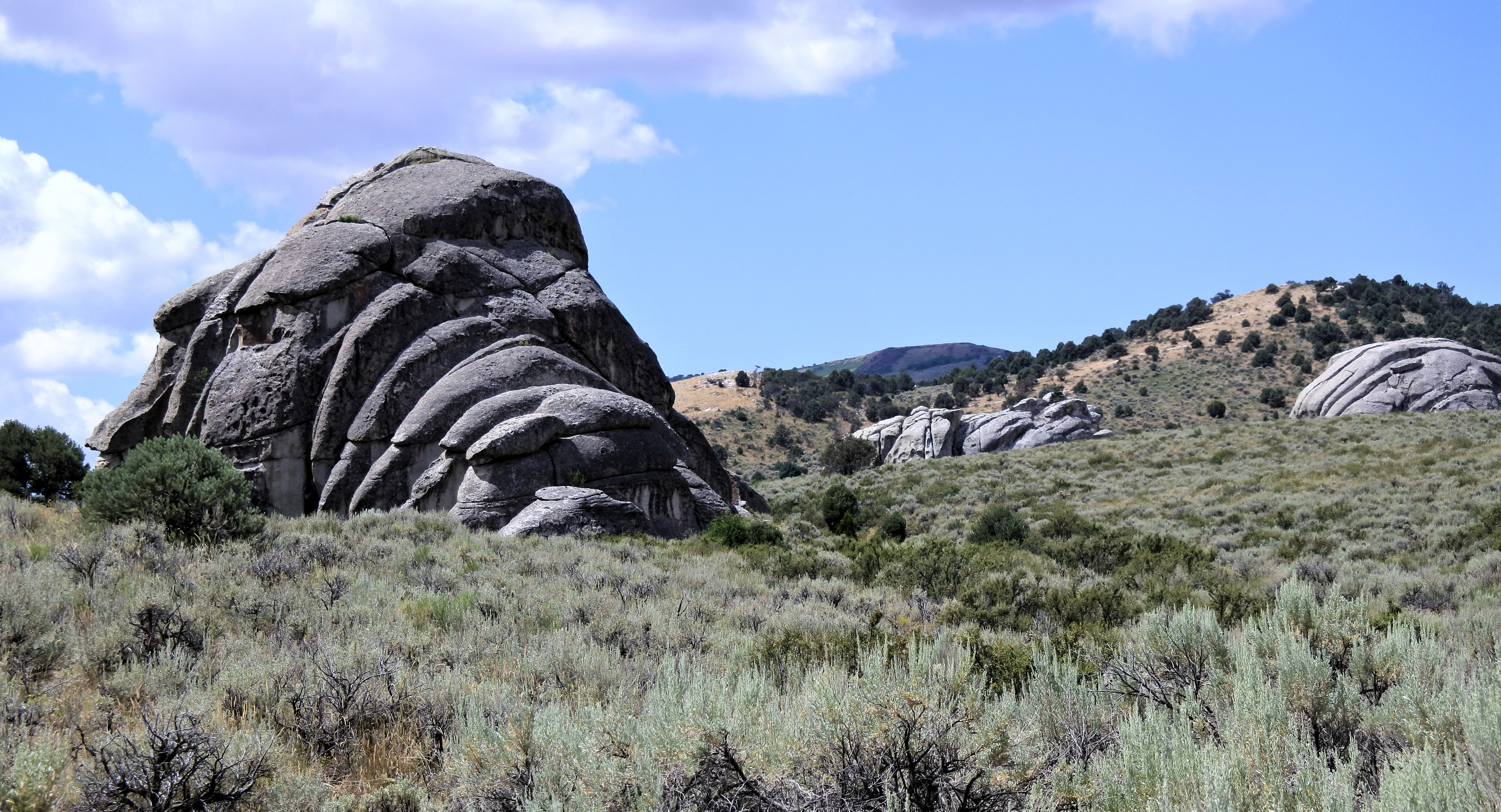

- Location within Idaho Location within the United States
- Location: Cassia County, Idaho, United States
- Nearest city: Oakley, Idaho
- Coordinates: 42°04′12″N 113°42′45″W
- Area: 14,407 acres (58.30 km^{2})
- Elevation: 6,260 ft (1,910 m)
- Designation: United States National Reserve
- Established: November 18, 1988
- Visitors: 90,898 (in 2025)
- Governing body: National Park Service & Idaho Department of Parks and Recreation
- Website: City of Rocks National Reserve

U.S. National Natural Landmark
- Designated: 1974

U.S. National Historic Landmark
- Designated: 1964
- Reference no.: 66000308

The City of Rocks National Reserve, also known as the Silent City of Rocks, is a United States National Reserve and state park in south-central Idaho, approximately 2 miles (3.2 km) north of the border with Utah. It is widely known for its granite rock formations and rock climbing.

The rock spires in the City of Rocks and adjacent Castle Rocks State Park are largely composed of granitic rock of the Oligocene Almo pluton and Archean Green Creek Complex. City of Rocks is also a popular rock climbing area, with over 1,000 traditional and bolt-protected routes. In the 1980s, it was home to some of the most difficult routes in the country, mostly developed by Idaho climber Tony Yaniro. Climbers in the region refer to the area as simply "The City".

During the 1840s and 1850s, wagon trains on the California Trail left the Raft River valley and traveled through the area and over Granite Pass into Nevada. Names or initials of emigrants written in axle grease are still visible on Register Rock, and ruts from wagon wheels can be seen in some of the rocks.

== History ==
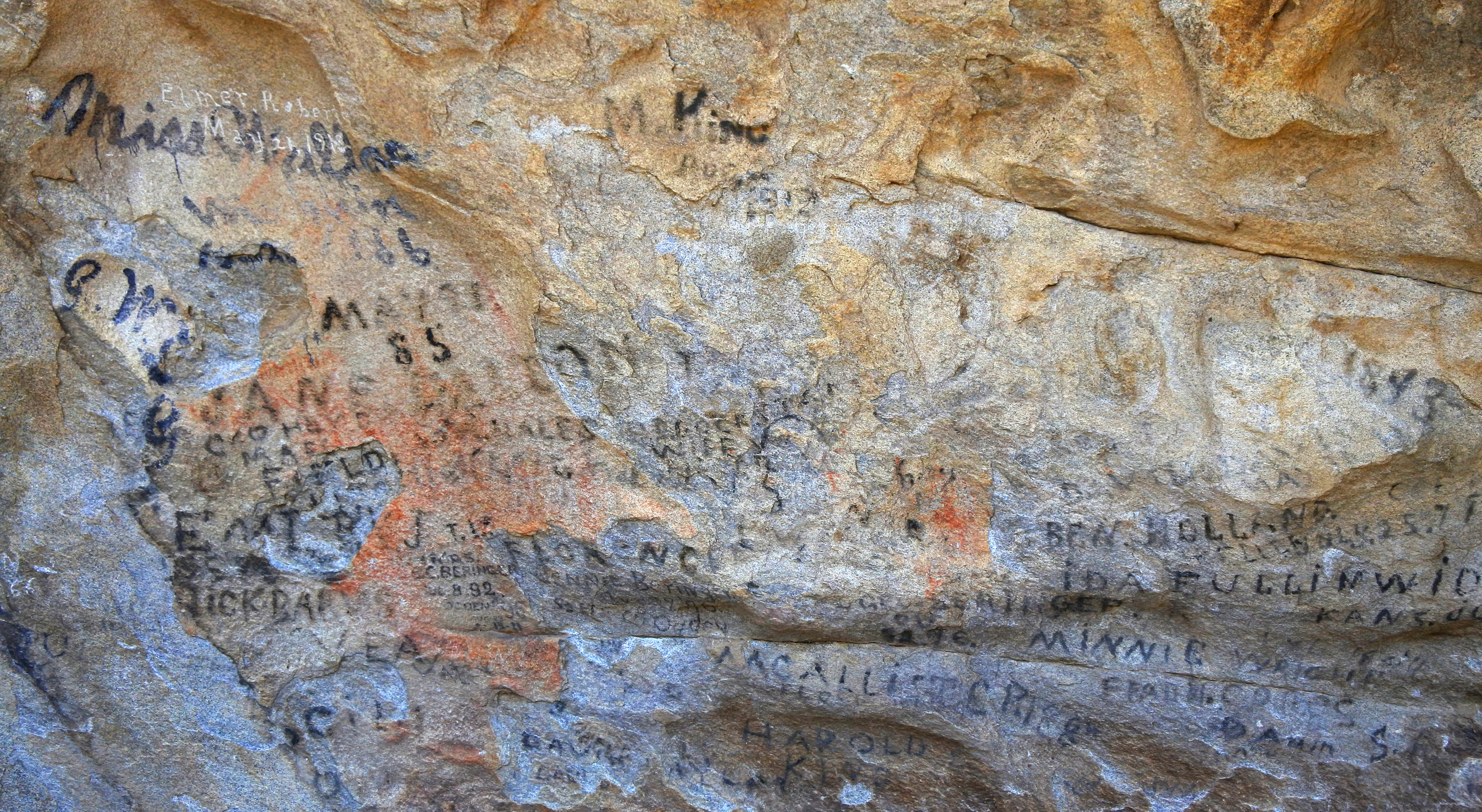
Emigrant inscriptions in axle grease on Camp Rock, City of Rocks National Reserve, Idaho.

In 1849, an emigrant party with James Wilkins "encamped at the city of the rocks" on the California Trail just north of the Great Salt Lake Desert. Signatures in axle grease on rock faces can be seen today. One emigrant saw the distant rocks in August like "water thrown up into the air from numerous artificial hydrants". Beginning in 1843, City of Rocks was a landmark for emigrants on the California Trail and Salt Lake Alternate Trail and later on freight routes and the Kelton, Utah to Boise, Idaho stage route.

The area's historical and geological values, scenery, and opportunities for recreation led to its designation as City of Rocks National Reserve in 1988. This unit of the National Park System is managed cooperatively by the National Park Service and the Idaho Department of Parks and Recreation.

=== Native American history ===
The Shoshone and Bannock tribes hunted the buffalo that once roamed in the City of Rocks area and gathered the nuts of the pinyon pine trees. The arrival of horses in the Americas in the 16th century and swelling European immigration disrupted the Shoshone-Bannock homelands and traditional way of life. They grew to resent the intruders but could do little to stop them. Most emigrants on the California Trail saw no Native Americans, but some of their journals record smoke rising from high hills and the surrounding mountains.

In 1826, Peter Skene Ogden and his Snake River brigade of beaver trappers were the first Euro-Americans to note the City of Rocks. Having few beaver, the area was ignored until 1843, when growing streams of wagons began flowing through the area in the summer.

=== California Trail ===
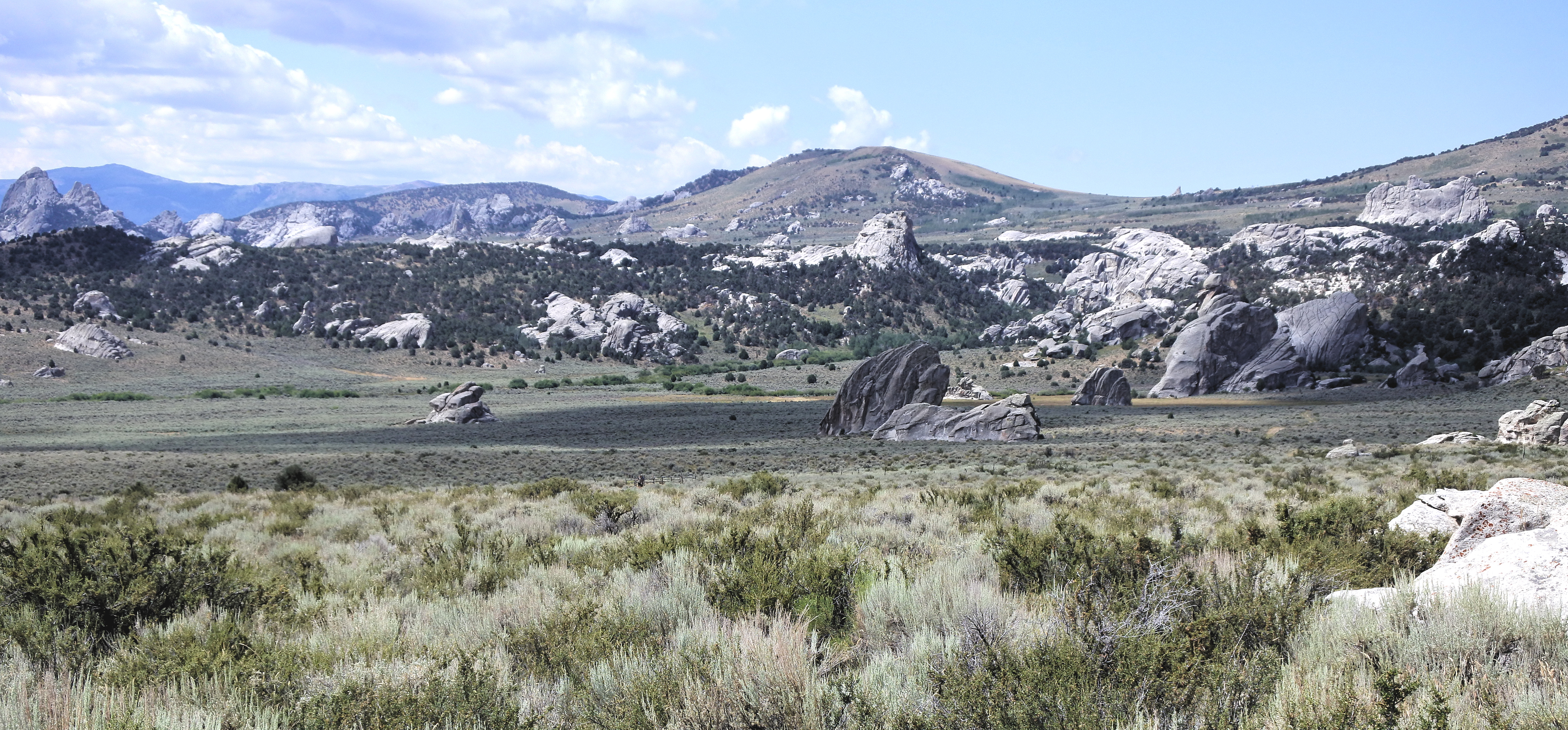
City of Rocks National Reserve, Idaho.

After multiple attempts to find a wagon route to California, early California settlers like Joseph B. Chiles and mountain men such as Joseph R. Walker found the route up the Raft River, through the City of Rocks, over Granite Pass and down a series of streams like Goose Creek and Thousand Springs to the Humboldt River. From the junction of the Humboldt near today's Wells, Nevada they could follow the Humboldt west to the Sierra Nevada (U.S.) and on to California. Both Chiles, Walker and later John C. Fremont led settlers over this route. Later wagon parties seldom used guides but followed the tracks of the early pioneer's wagons or the wagons in front of them. By 1850 so many people were on the trail that it was often like a long traveling village crawling its way to California. Newspapers and independent publishers in the east or mid-west often published emigrant "guides" that could be bought for little money from several different authors by 1850. The City of Rocks and the nearby Granite Pass (Idaho) marked roughly halfway to California for the emigrants and their loaded wagons. By 1846, some emigrants headed for Oregon's Willamette Valley also used this route as part of the Applegate Trail. This rugged cutoff was little used in later years.

In 1848 Samuel J. Hensley, a pioneer that accompanied Joseph B. Chiles in 1842, pioneered the Salt Lake Cutoff from Salt Lake City north of the Great Salt Lake when he traveled east while returning to Missouri. The Salt Lake cutoff rejoined the main California Trail near the City of Rocks. Settlers using the Salt Lake Cutoff traveled about the same number of miles as settlers going by way of Fort Hall and west along the Snake River valley route. In 1852, some 52,000 people passed through the City of Rocks on their way to join the California Gold Rush.

When the California Trail was first opened in 1843, Granite Pass, near City of Rocks provided the pass that allowed an "easy" connection with streams and creeks that provided the needed water and grass for their teams along the way between the Raft River and the Humboldt River. After 1850 the Pass initially became part of Utah Territory, and in 1872 an Idaho-Utah boundary survey error establishing the Utah-Idaho boundary. placed Granite Pass in Idaho Territory. With the completion of the first transcontinental railroad on 9 May 1869, the overland wagon routes began to pass into history. However, wagons and stage lines saw continued use on regional supply routes that spread out from the railroad line to cities not on the railway line(s).

John Halley's stage route connected the railroad (CPRR) station at Kelton, Utah, with Idaho's mining hub of Boise, Idaho, and supplied the early economic development of Idaho, which won statehood in 1890. The Kelton stage route passed through the City of Rocks, with a stage station set up near the junction of the old California Trail and the Salt Lake Cutoff. Settlers began to homestead the City of Rocks area in the late 19th century. Dryland farming declined during the drought years of the 1920s and 1930s, but ranching survived. Livestock grazing began with early wagon use of the area in the mid-19th century and continues today.

One of the favorite camping spots for emigrants was Camp Rock. Emigrants wrote on the stone face with axle grease writing out their names and dates of passage.

== Facts and designations ==
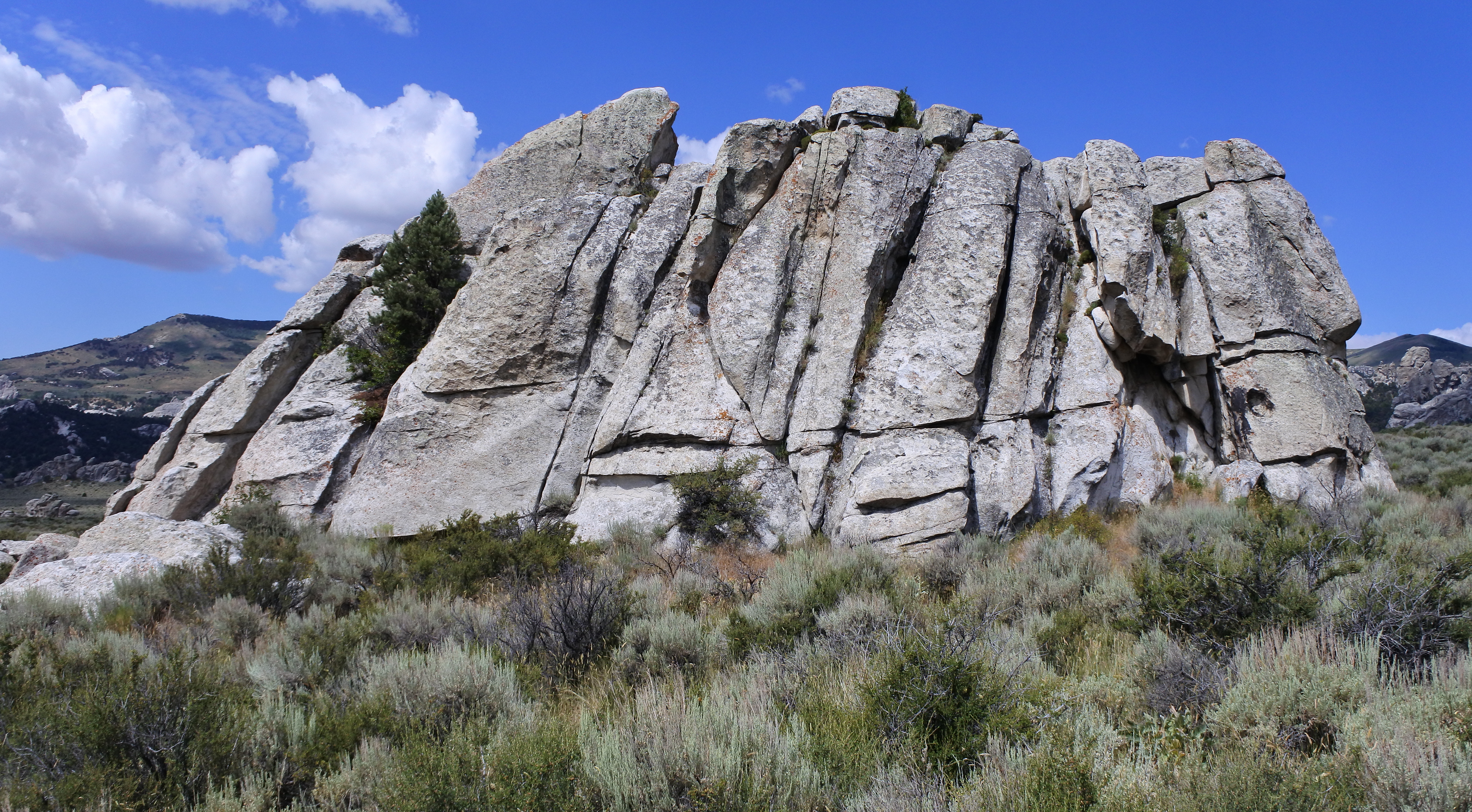
Joints in the Almo Pluton, City of Rocks National Reserve, Idaho.

The Idaho Legislature declared Section 36 within City of Rocks as a state park under the jurisdiction of the Idaho Land Board on February 27, 1957. In 1964, a much larger area (more than 12,000 acres (49 km^{2})) was designated a National Historic Landmark. On March 15, 1973, Section 36 was transferred to the Idaho Department of Parks and Recreation from the Department of Lands. The following year, the area was designated a National Natural Landmark. The National Park Service studied the site in the 1970s and 80s as a proposed national monument.

City of Rocks National Reserve was created November 18, 1988 by Public Law 100-696, Arizona-Idaho Conservation Act of 1988. This Act drew a 22-mile (35 km) boundary around 14,407 acres (58.30 km^{2}) owned or managed by the USDA Forest Service, Bureau of Land Management, Idaho Department of Parks and Recreation (IDPR), and private individuals. All lands owned by the United States within the Reserve boundaries were placed under the authority of the National Park Service (NPS). Between 1988 and 1996, the Reserve was co-managed by both NPS and IDPR. After the approval of a comprehensive management plan, the NPS officially transferred on-site management of the Reserve to IDPR on May 2, 1996. Today, the park functions under a unique cooperative agreement between the NPS and IDPR. Both agencies allocate partial funding to its operation. City of Rocks National Reserve is visited annually by over 80,000 visitors. The Reserve headquarters is located in the gateway community of Almo.

== Environment ==
City of Rocks is an encirclement of granite rising out of the rolling sagebrush country in south-central Idaho. The Shoshone camped here, as did emigrants traveling along the California Trail. The reserve has significant biological diversity concentrated in a small area.

=== Geologic formations ===
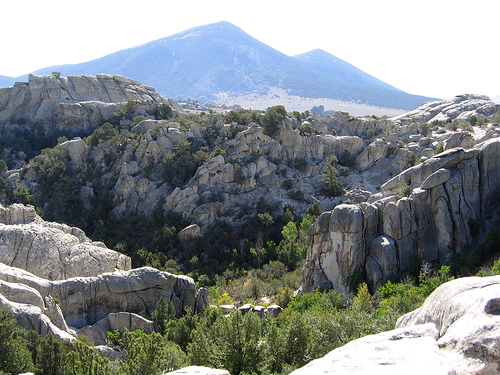
View from within the City of Rocks

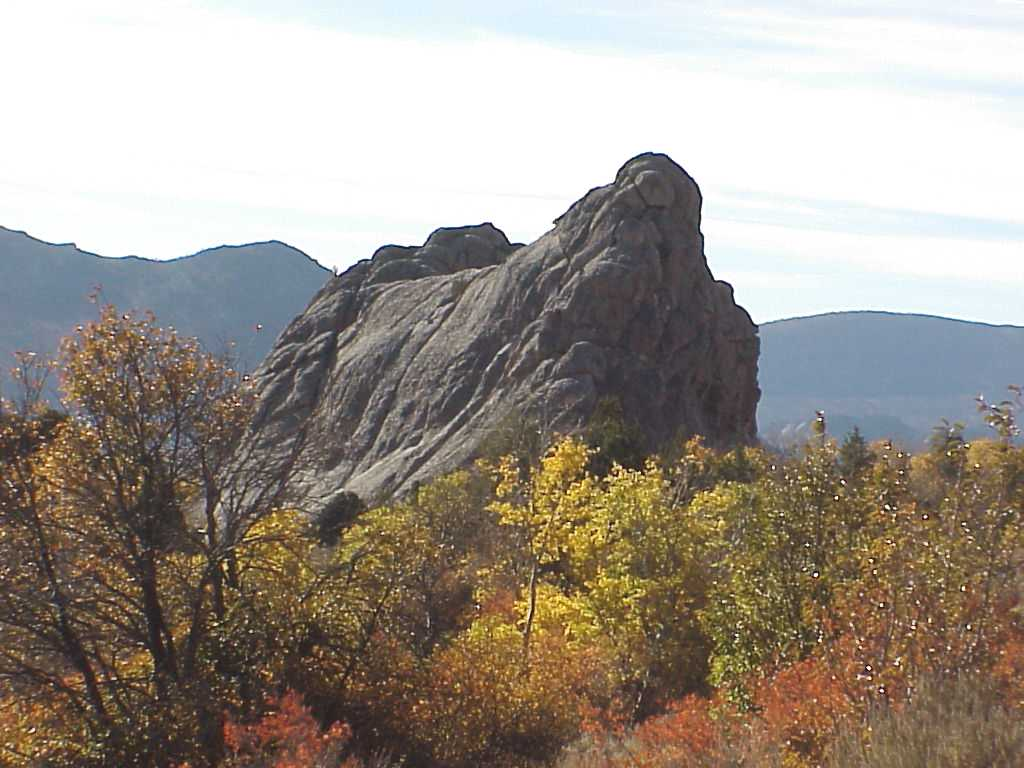
Bath Rock in the City of Rocks National Reserve in Idaho State

The landscape of City of Rocks has been sculpted from granite that was intruded into the crust during two widely spaced times. The granite that composes most of the spires is part of the 28-million-year-old Almo pluton. However, some of the spires are made of granite that is part of the 2.5 billion-year-old Green Creek Complex that contains some of the oldest rocks in the western United States. The granite has eroded into a fascinating assortment of shapes.

City of Rocks was designated a National Reserve, a unit of the National Park Service, in recognition of the nationally significant geological and scenic values of its rock formations and the historical significance of the California Trail. Rock formations in the reserve developed through an erosion process called exfoliation, during which thin rock plates and scales sloughed off along joints in the rocks. The joints, or fractures, resulted from the contraction of the granite as it cooled, from an upward expansion of the granite as overlying materials were eroded away, and from regional tectonic stresses. The granite has eroded into a fascinating assortment of shapes as high as 600 feet (180 m). The upper surfaces of a number of the rocks are covered with flat-floored weathering pits known as panholes. The most notable panhole is located on top of Bath Rock and is continuously filled with water from rain or snowmelt.

=== Animals ===
Located in the Northern Basin and Range/Snake-Columbia shrub steppe ecoregions and the Raft Watershed of the Upper Snake River Basin, the habitat of the reserve supports a large variety of mammals, birds, reptiles, and invertebrates.

- Amphibians - Common amphibians that could be found near water include boreal toad, Great Basin spadefoot toad, and northern leopard frog.
- Birds - The reserve provides breeding and prey habitat for multiple raptor species including golden eagle, prairie falcon, red-tailed hawk, northern harrier, sharp-shinned hawk, Cooper's hawk, American kestrel, turkey vulture, and great horned owl. Swainson's hawk and ferruginous hawk are less abundant in the reserve. Other common bird species includes sage grouse, pinon jay, Clark's nutcracker, common nighthawk, rock doves, mourning doves, cliff swallow, mountain bluebird, hermit thrush, mountain chickadee, rock wren, house wren, solitary vireos, warbling vireos, green-tailed towhee, Virginia's warbler, Brewer's blackbird, and various sparrows.
- Mammals - A partial list of mammals in the reserve includes, cougar, mule deer, coyote, bobcat, badger, yellow-bellied marmot, cliff chipmunk, mountain cottontail rabbit, black-tailed jackrabbit, snowshoe hare, northern grasshopper mouse, Merriam's shrew, several species of voles, and a variety of bats. Pronghorn and bison were probably common a century ago.
- Reptiles - Typical lizard species include the western whiptail, western fence lizard, Long-nosed leopard lizard, sagebrush lizard, and northern desert horned lizard. Snakes include the western rattlesnake, Great Basin gopher snake, striped whipsnake, and wandering garter snake. The western rattlesnake is the only strongly venomed snake found in the reserve.

=== Plants ===
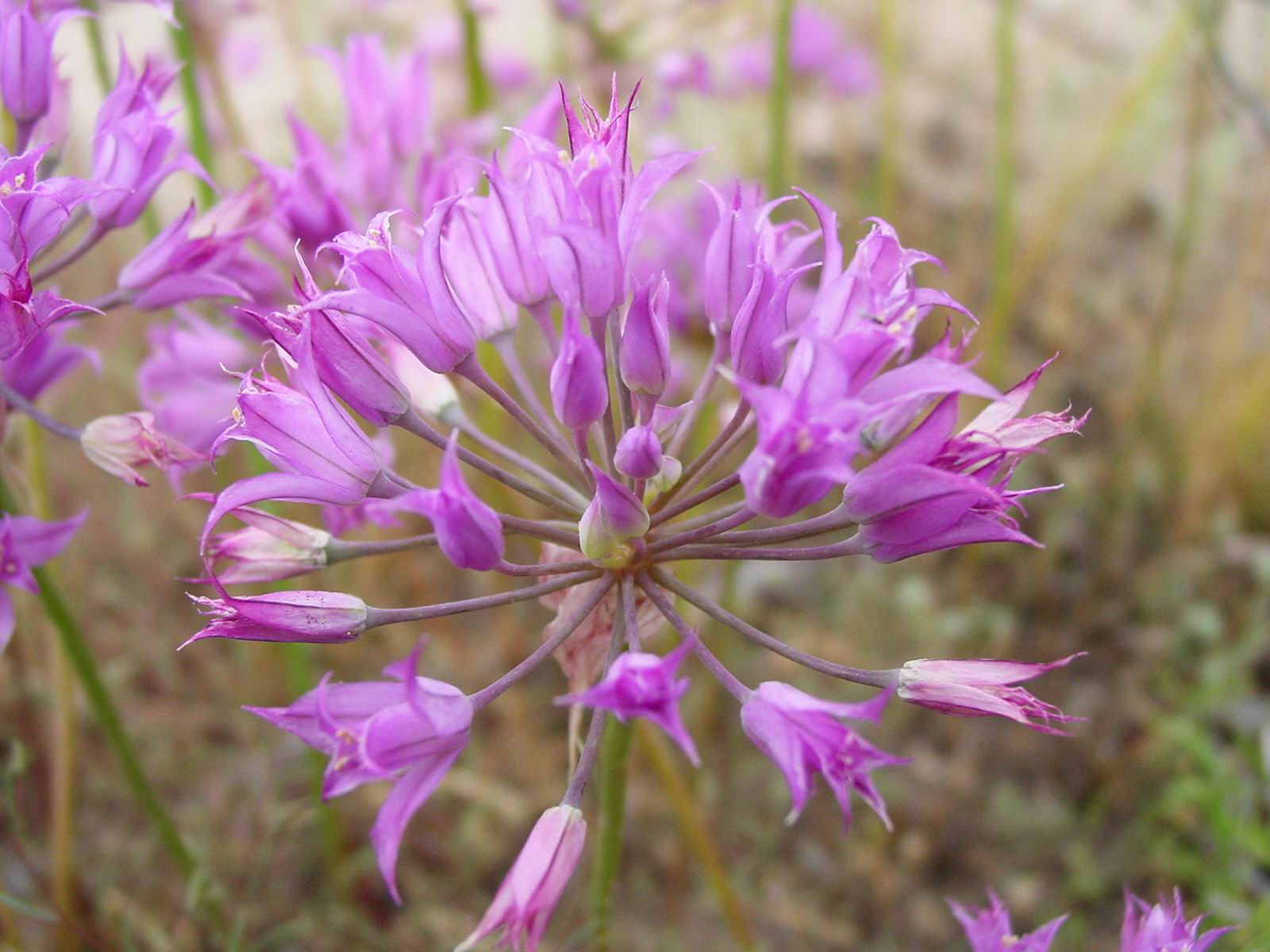
Allium acuminatum is a wild onion found in City of Rocks

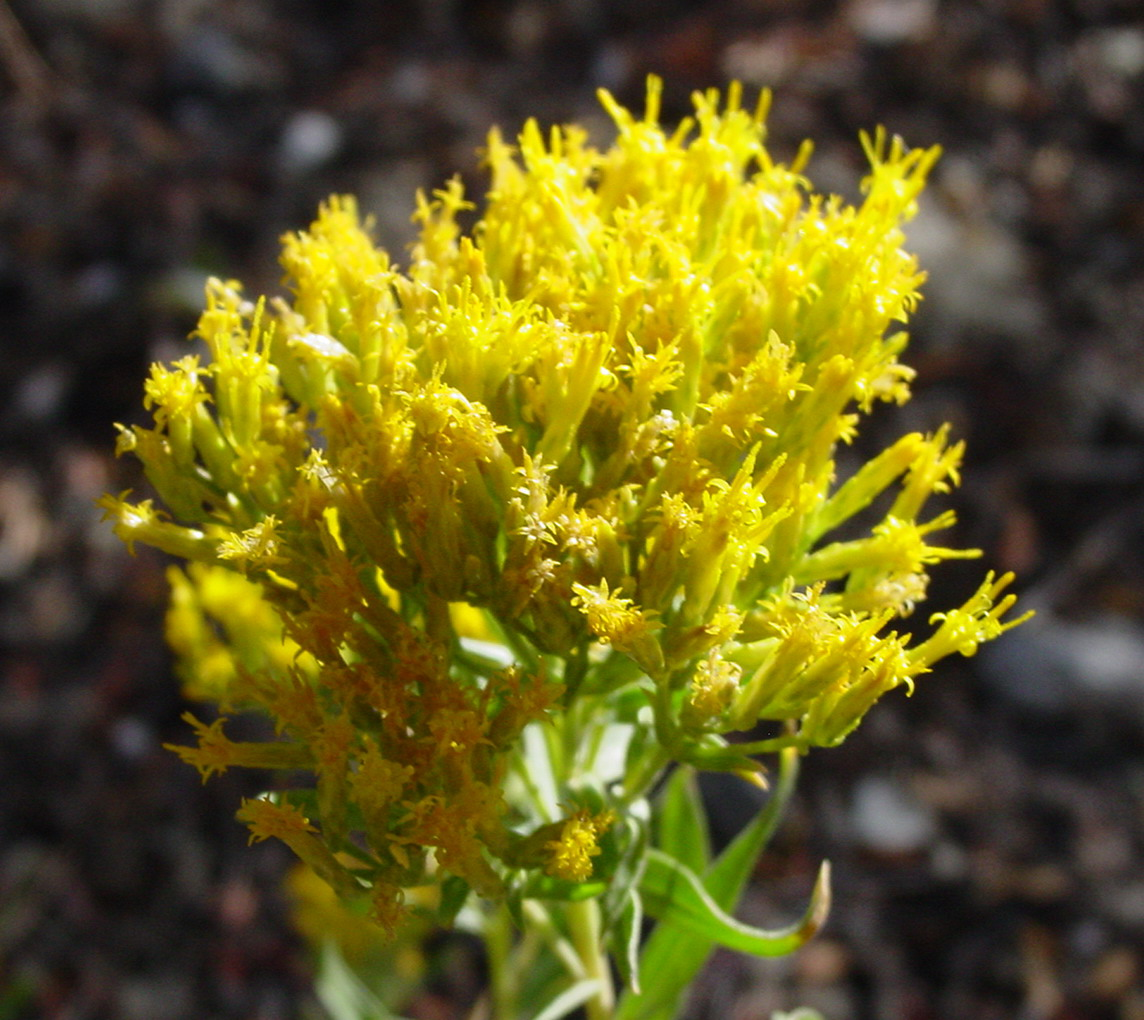
Chrysothamnus viscidiflorus

Notable plant life includes:

- The Kruckeberg's sword fern is found in the cool, moist micro-habitats in the granite formations. The fern grows in rock crevices and is normally found at higher elevations than City of Rocks. Primary threats to this species are trampling and or removal by visitors along rock climbing routes.
- Stands of piñon/juniper woodlands are dominated by the single-leaf piñon pine and Utah juniper, interspersed with mountain big sagebrush and curl-leaf mountain mahogany. The pinon seed is edible and gathered by local residents. Higher slopes are covered with mountain big sagebrush, snowberry, serviceberry, and bitterbrush, with other shrubs, grasses, and herbs growing in the openings between shrubs. Groves of aspen, stands of douglas-fir and lodgepole pine, are located on the upper stony/grassy slopes of the reserve. Quaking aspen groves occur in canyons containing streams.

Other dominant plants in the City of Rocks National Reserve include:

- Piñon / juniper woodlands and forest
- Conifer / aspen woodlands and forests
- Riparian scrub and herbaceous wetlands
- Big sagebrush and grasslands
- Mixed scrub
- Mountain mahogany scrubs
- High elevation meadows
- Other unvegetated areas

=== Weather ===
The semi-arid climate is characterized by low to moderate precipitation, great extremes in both daily and seasonal temperatures, and low relative humidity. Average annual precipitation is approximately 14 inches (360 mm) at the lower elevations and 22 inches (560 mm) in the highest areas. Average snow depths for higher elevations range between 35 and 68 inches (1.7 m). Summers are hot and dry with occasional thunderstorms.

Climate data for OAKLEY, ID
Month	Jan	Feb	Mar	Apr	May	Jun	Jul	Aug	Sep	Oct	Nov	Dec	Year
Record high °F (°C)	64 (18)	70 (21)	77 (25)	90 (32)	98 (37)	104 (40)	105 (41)	107 (42)	100 (38)	91 (33)	76 (24)	73 (23)	107 (42)
Mean daily maximum °F (°C)	38.1 (3.4)	42.8 (6.0)	50.8 (10.4)	59.9 (15.5)	68.4 (20.2)	77.4 (25.2)	86.6 (30.3)	85.5 (29.7)	75.8 (24.3)	64.3 (17.9)	49.4 (9.7)	39.6 (4.2)	61.5 (16.4)
Mean daily minimum °F (°C)	19.0 (−7.2)	22.7 (−5.2)	27.7 (−2.4)	33.3 (0.7)	40.0 (4.4)	46.9 (8.3)	54.4 (12.4)	52.9 (11.6)	44.2 (6.8)	35.9 (2.2)	27.3 (−2.6)	20.5 (−6.4)	35.4 (1.9)
Record low °F (°C)	−25 (−32)	−27 (−33)	−2 (−19)	2 (−17)	17 (−8)	24 (−4)	31 (−1)	30 (−1)	17 (−8)	8 (−13)	−14 (−26)	−26 (−32)	−27 (−33)
Average precipitation inches (mm)	0.80 (20)	0.68 (17)	0.91 (23)	1.19 (30)	1.52 (39)	1.18 (30)	0.71 (18)	0.72 (18)	0.75 (19)	0.86 (22)	0.78 (20)	0.76 (19)	10.86 (275)
Average snowfall inches (cm)	7.0 (18)	4.5 (11)	4.2 (11)	2.1 (5.3)	0.5 (1.3)	0 (0)	0 (0)	0 (0)	0 (0)	0.5 (1.3)	2.9 (7.4)	5.5 (14)	27.2 (69.3)
Source: http://www.wrcc.dri.edu/cgi-bin/cliMAIN.pl?id6542

=== Mountains ===
The reserve is in the southern part of the Albion Mountains, bordered on the east by the Raft River valley and to the north by the Snake River valley. Elevations rise from 5,650 feet (1,720 m) where Circle Creek meets the reserve boundary to 8,867 feet (2,703 m) at the top of Graham Peak to the north.

=== Soils ===
The majority of the soils in the reserve are composed of grus, a coarse angular sand derived from the disintegration of the underlying granitic bedrock. They are highly erodible. Soil erosion is greatest near roads and on steep slopes and intermittent stream channels. Erosion in these areas has formed deep gullies. Some of the exposed soil banks are over 8 feet (2.4 m) high.

== Controversy ==
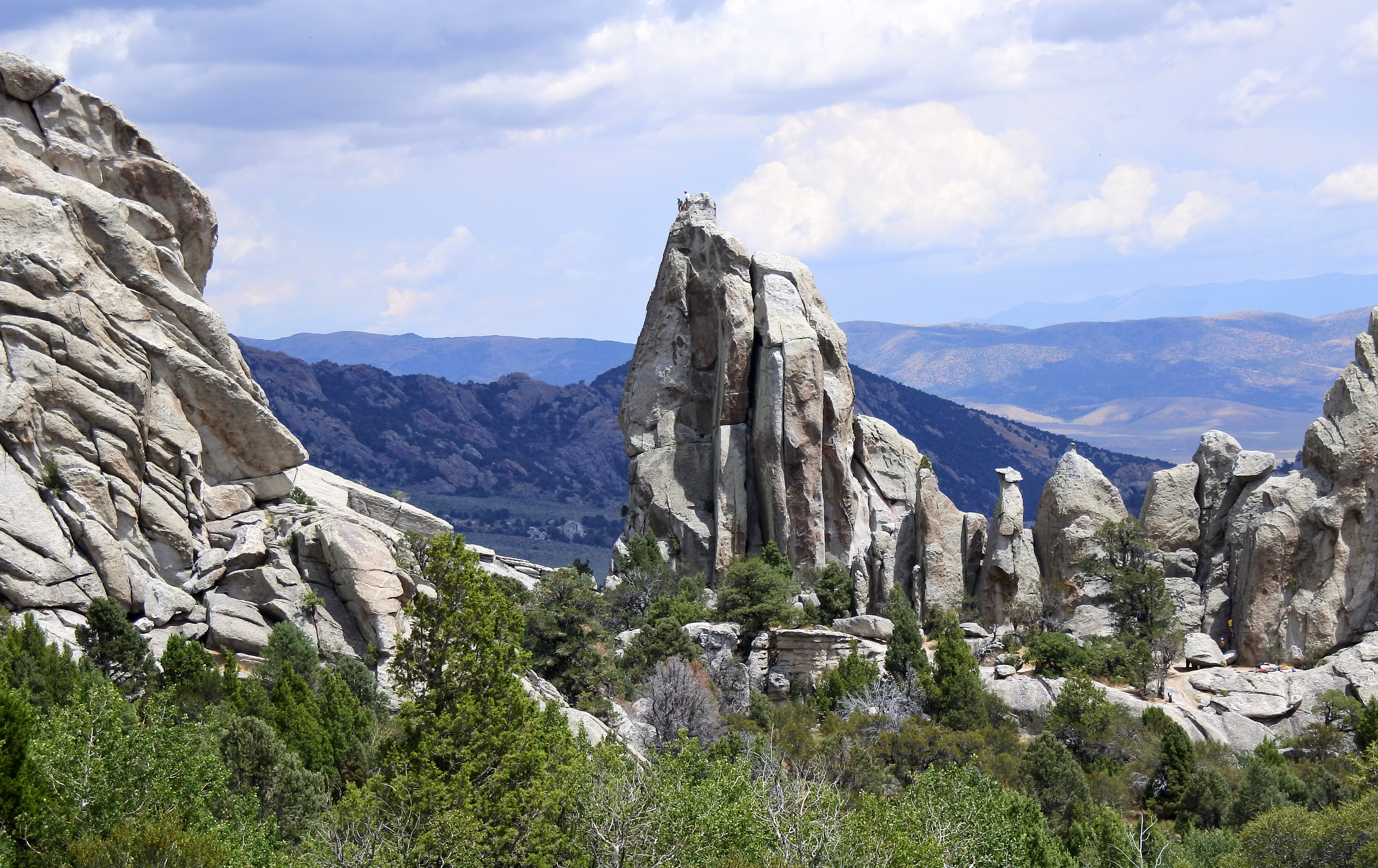
Morning Glory Spire, a popular climbing spot in City of Rocks National Reserve, Idaho

Climbing on the Twin Sisters, a major geological formation in the Reserve, was banned following a National Park Service decision and later court case involving the Access Fund. The Access Fund asserted that the NPS decision was "arbitrary and capricious", while the NPS claimed that rock climbing on the Twin Sisters disrupted the "historic viewshed" of the California Trail.

== See also ==
- Oakley stone
- List of National Historic Landmarks in Idaho
- List of National Natural Landmarks in Idaho
- National Parks in Idaho
- National Register of Historic Places listings in Cassia County, Idaho
