= Granite Pass =

Granite Pass may be one of the following:

== Mountain passes ==
- Granite Pass (Arizona) – a pass in La Paz County, Arizona, United States
- Granite Pass (Fresno County, California) – a pass in Fresno County, California, United States
- Granite Pass (Riverside County, California) – a pass in Riverside County, California, United States
- Granite Pass (Drinkwater Lake, California) – a pass in San Bernardino County, California, United States
- Granite Pass (Van Winkle Spring, California) – a pass in San Bernardino County, California, United States
- Granite Pass (Colorado) – a pass in Rocky Mountain National Park, Colorado, United States
- Granite Pass (California Trail) – a pass in Cassia County, Idaho, United States
- Granite Pass (Idaho-Montana) – a pass between Clearwater County, Idaho, and Missoula County, Montana, United States
- Granite Pass (New Mexico) – a pass in Hidalgo County, New Mexico, United States
- Granite Pass (Okanogan and Skagit counties, Washington) – a pass between Okanogan County and Skagit County, Washington, United States
- Granite Pass (Pend Oreille County, Washington) – a pass in Pend Oreille County, Washington, United States
- Granite Pass (Snohomish County, Washington) – a pass in Snohomish County, Washington, United States
- Granite Pass (Wyoming) – a pass between Big Horn County and Sheridan County, Wyoming, United States
