= Oakley stone =

Variety of quartzite

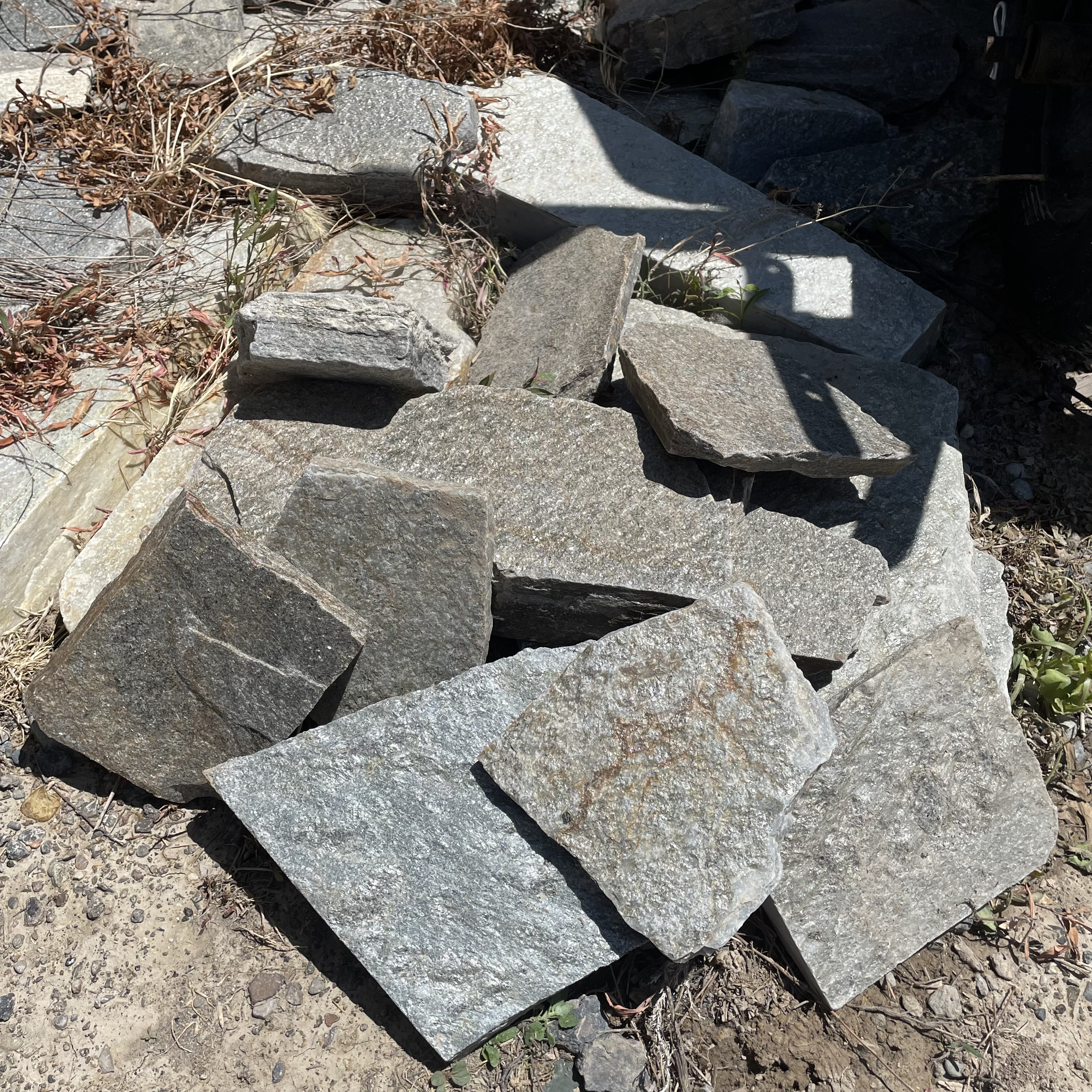
A pile of Oakley stone depicting different colors, textures, and lusters.

Location in the United States
Location of Oakley stone quarries in southern Idaho

Oakley stone is the trade name of a building stone that occurs in the mountains of southern Idaho in the western United States. It is more properly known as Rocky Mountain quartzite or Idaho quartzite, a metamorphic rock. The stone is quarried south of the city of Oakley in Cassia County, northeast of the three-state border with Nevada and Utah. The quarries are located on the west slope of Middle Mountain in the Albion Mountains, northwest of the City of Rocks National Reserve.

Oakley stone is micaceous, meaning it is a mica-bearing stone. This mineral gives the product a fish-scale-like sheen. The stone is noted for its great variety of colors, ranging from white and silver to browns, yellows, and golds. Another stone in the area, Elba Quartzite, is a green micaceous quartzite. The green color of the rock is the result of chromium in the mica which is also known as fuchsite. The original sedimentary rock from which the quartzite formed was a quartz-rich sandstone. During the metamorphic process, the pressure caused the layers of clay within the sandstone to thin and flatten into the mica-rich layers. The space between planes of parting or foliation are consistent which makes it uniform in thickness.

The outcroppings of the stone usually lie parallel to the ground and occur in large plates that can be easily split into thin veneers. Beginning in 1948, the stone was mined and sold in large quantities throughout the United States. It used for interior decoration, fireplace mantels, decks and patios, or facing buildings. A variant is "builders" which are naturally occurring brick-shaped pieces used to face building exteriors, building property walls, or fireplaces. There are about a dozen companies in the Oakley area quarrying the stone.

Archie Boyd Teater's Studio designed by Frank Lloyd Wright used the stone in both the exterior and interior of the building.

== Geography ==
The staging area for quarried Oakley stone is located at 42°8′20.4″N 113°53′24″W (42.139, -113.89), at an elevation of 5,600 feet (1,705 m) above sea level. The quarries are to the east and Middle Mountain is to the southeast, with a summit over 8,400 feet (2,560 m).
