= National Register of Historic Places listings in Cassia County, Idaho =

Location of Cassia County in Idaho

This is a list of the National Register of Historic Places listings in Cassia County, Idaho.

This is intended to be a complete list of the properties and districts on the National Register of Historic Places in Cassia County, Idaho, United States. Latitude and longitude coordinates are provided for many National Register properties and districts; these locations may be seen together in a map.

There are 7 properties and districts listed on the National Register in the county, including 1 National Historic Landmark. More may be added; properties and districts nationwide are added to the Register weekly.

This National Park Service list is complete through NPS recent listings posted December 12, 2025.

== Current listings ==
	Name on the Register	Image	Date listed	Location	City or town	Description
1	Albion Methodist Church	Albion Methodist Church	September 4, 1986 (#86002161)	102 North St. 42°24′47″N 113°34′39″W	Albion	
2	Albion Normal School Campus	Albion Normal School Campus	November 28, 1980 (#80001298)	Off State Highway 77; 42°24′48″N 113°35′02″W	Albion	
3	Cassia County Courthouse	Cassia County Courthouse	September 27, 1987 (#87001583)	15th St. and Overland Ave. 42°32′04″N 113°47′31″W	Burley	
4	City of Rocks	City of Rocks	October 15, 1966 (#66000308)	City of Rocks National Reserve; 42°04′32″N 113°42′50″W	Almo	
5	Granite Pass		June 28, 1972 (#72000439)	South of Oakley, less than 0.5 miles (0.80 km) north of the Utah border 41°59′32″N 113°51′03″W	Oakley	
6	Oakley Historic District	Oakley Historic District	November 28, 1980 (#80001299)	Main St. and Wilson Ave. 42°14′26″N 113°52′59″W	Oakley	
7	Swanger Hall	Swanger Hall	September 20, 1978 (#78001058)	Albion State Normal School campus 42°24′48″N 113°34′58″W	Albion	

== See also ==
- List of National Historic Landmarks in Idaho
- National Register of Historic Places listings in Idaho
