= Arizona-Idaho Conservation Act of 1988 =

Law that created many national park units and art organizations

- Acronyms (colloquial): AICA
- Nicknames: Arizona-Idaho Conservation Act
- Enacted by: the 100th United States Congress

Citations
- Public law: Pub. L. 100–696

Legislative history
- Introduced in the Senate as S. 2840 by J. Bennett Johnston (D–LA) on September 15, 1988; Committee consideration by United States Senate Committee on Energy and Natural Resources; Passed the Senate on October 18, 1988; Passed the House on October 20, 1988; Signed into law by President Ronald Reagan on November 18, 1988

The Arizona-Idaho Conservation Act of 1988, Public Law 100-696, enacted November 18, 1988, focuses on land conservation and related issues in Arizona, Idaho, and Minnesota. It also addresses art and preservation efforts by Congress.

President Ronald Reagan signed the "Arizona-Idaho Conservation Act of 1988," following the determination that an earlier law that authorized the minting of commemorative coins was unconstitutional for allowing to US congress to use functions reserved for the executive branch in spending the funds raised by the coins. He stated that the enactment of the conservation act would resolve constitutional concerns by ensuring that proceeds from the coin sales would be exclusively directed to the Capitol Preservation Fund

The act was mired in some controversy when it was alleged that the biological opinion by the US Fish and Wildlife Service that the Mount Graham International Observatory construction would not affect an endangered squirrel species was thrown into question by the Sierra Club. Ultimately the observatory was constructed.

== Provisions ==
As a result of AICA multiple conservation areas and art organizations were established including:

- San Pedro Riparian National Conservation Area: Established to protect the riparian area and various resources in southern Arizona.
- City of Rocks National Reserve: Established to preserve historical and cultural resources and maintain scenic quality in southern Idaho.
- Hagerman Fossil Beds National Monument: Established to preserve paleontological sites and promote research in southern Idaho.
- Mount Graham International Observatory: Authorized a new observatory in the Pinaleño Mountains of Arizona.
- Mississippi National River and Recreation Area: Established a new unit of the National Park Service to protect the two major rivers in the Minneapolis-St. Paul area. The National Park Services uses the provisions of the AICA to this day to ensure development does not impair the resources of the Mississippi River in the Twin Cities.
- United States Capitol Preservation Commission: Established to oversee improvements and preservation of the United States Capitol.
- Senate Commission on Art: Provisions related to the Senate Commission on Art were established.
- House of Representatives Fine Arts Board: Established to oversee fine arts within the House of Representatives.
