= Randall Fawcett House =

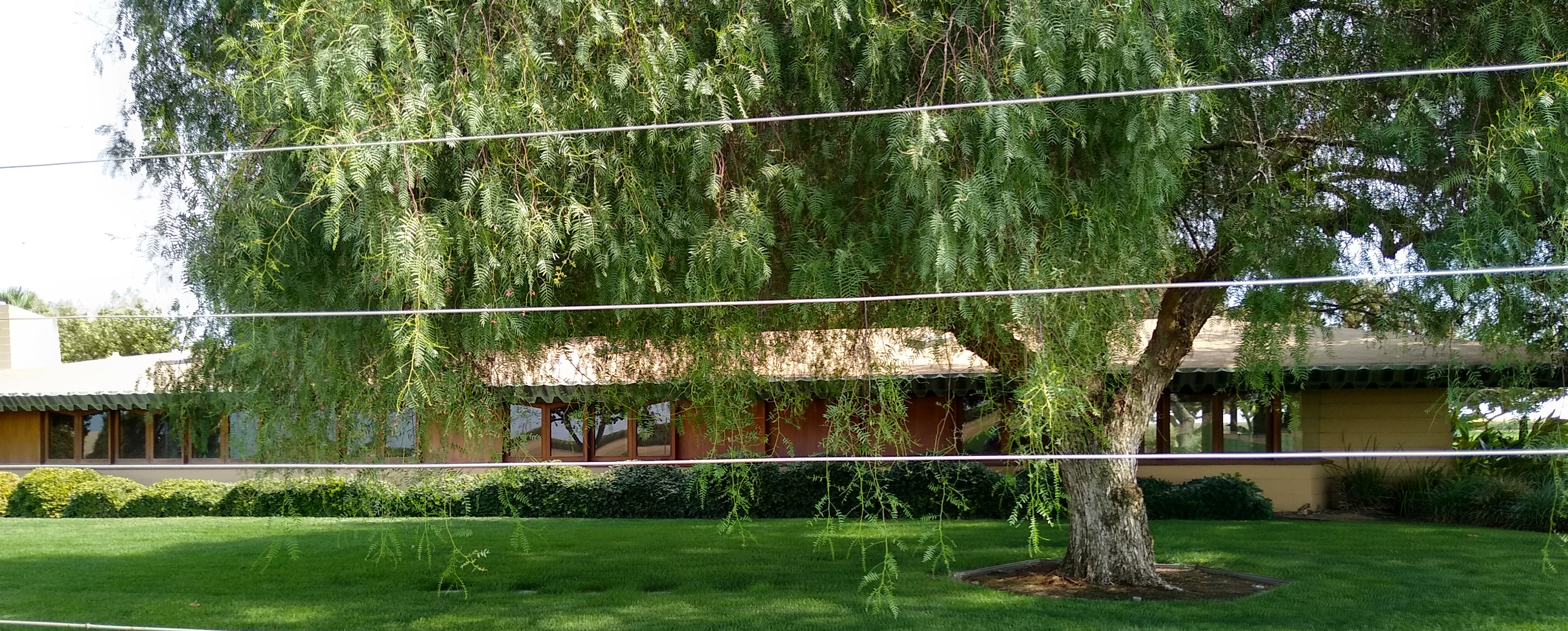

- Location within California

General information
- Type: House
- Architectural style: Usonian
- Location: Los Banos, California
- Coordinates: 36.973505°N 120.850344°W
- Construction started: 1959

Technical details
- Floor area: 3,700 sq ft

Design and construction
- Architect: Frank Lloyd Wright

The Randall Fawcett House is a Frank Lloyd Wright–designed Usonian home in Los Banos, California. The home was designed in 1955 and completed in 1961.

The original owners, Randall "Buck" and Harriet Fawcett, met Wright while taking an architecture course at Stanford University. Buck Fawcett was a star college football player, selected by the Chicago Bears in the 1944 NFL draft. Instead, he returned to work the Los Banos farm that his father had homesteaded, after the patriarch became seriously ill with valley fever. The couple's daughter Lynn and her husband, the writer Henry Whiting II, live in the Wright-designed Archie Boyd Teater Studio in Bliss, Idaho.

The Fawcett House is one of three Usonians in California's Central Valley (along with the Dr. George Ablin House in Bakersfield and the Robert G. Walton House in Modesto), being located on a farmland. Constructed of battered (sloped) concrete block, the house has an "H" or "K" plan with wings at 60- or 120-degree angles. The broad copper fascia and horizontal roof line lies flat and long like the 80 acres (320,000 m^{2}) of crop fields the house rests on. The yard is landscaped with a Koi pond and swimming pool. The house has a shallow, circular flower planter atop one of the walls near the entrance. The hearth's 12-foot-wide fireplace rises tall and grand to the left of the entrance. Living spaces incorporate five bedrooms, 4.5 baths, open-plan living room, dining room, a kitchen formalized by ornamental screens, a utility-store room and central laundry.

== See also ==
- List of Frank Lloyd Wright works

== Sources ==
- Storrer, William Allin (1993). The Frank Lloyd Wright Companion. Chicago: University of Chicago Press. ISBN 978-0-226-77624-8. (S.385)
