= Salt Lake Cutoff =

Path in the United States

A map of the California Trail including the Salt Lake Cutoff to the north of the Great Salt Lake.

The Salt Lake Cutoff is one of the many shortcuts (or cutoffs) that branched from the California, Mormon and Oregon Trails in the United States. It led northwest out of Salt Lake City, Utah and north of the Great Salt Lake for about 180 miles (290 km) before rejoining the California trail near the City of Rocks, Idaho. From there Oregon Trail travelers could easily travel down the Raft River valley portion of the California Trail to return to the Oregon Trail. It provided a way to stop in Salt Lake City (the only significant city on the trail then) for repairs, fresh supplies, fresh livestock, etc. In later years it was used by tens of thousands of pioneers and miners going east and west on their way to or from the future states of California, Oregon, Utah, Idaho, Montana, Nevada or Washington.

== History ==
Samuel J. Hensley, returning to California in the summer of 1848, led a pack train of ten men on a quest to get back to the California Trail. After trying Hastings Route south of the Great Salt Lake and finding the salt flats too soft (heavy rains that year) for passage he returned to Salt Lake City and discovered a route, north of the Great Salt Lake. His newly blazed trail (cutoff) went from Salt Lake City back to the Oregon Trail and/or California Trail, rejoining it near the City of Rocks, Idaho—about 7 miles (11 km) north of today's Utah–Idaho border. This became known as the Salt Lake Cutoff and was about the same distance as the Fort Hall, Snake River, Raft River, City of Rocks route which it bypassed.

On the Humboldt River portion of the California Trail route, Hensley met and talked with a party of former Mormon Battalion personnel consisting of 45 men and one woman under Samuel Thompson driving wagons east on the California Trail to rejoin their families in Utah. On September 15, 1848 they found the junction of Hensley's pack trail near the rock formation called the Twin Sisters. Thompson's group with wagons followed Hensley's pack trail back to Salt Lake City—converting it into a passable wagon road. Thompson's company traveled southeast into northern Utah, crossing Deep Creek near present-day Snowville, Utah. They found plentiful water and grass on the route just as Hensley had told them. With some difficulty they crossed the Malad River and the Bear River still traveling south east. They then went to the tiny community of Ogden, Utah where they crossed the Weber River before traveling on to Salt Lake City. Ebenezer Brown, leading a party from the 1846 Mormon ship Brooklyn, followed them three weeks later and helped to further define the trail. Word spread quickly that a good road with good grass and water was known out of Salt Lake City back to the California or Oregon Trail.

When the gold-crazy emigrants of 1849 heard of this new route to the California gold fields, many thousands detoured to Salt Lake City to get new supplies and livestock. In Utah, ferries charging a few dollars per wagon were established at the Weber, Bear River and the Malad River in 1849 and later. An estimated 10,000 to 15,000 California- or Oregon-bound immigrants a year passed through Salt Lake City between 1849 and 1852. Thousands more followed every year before 1869 and the Transcontinental Railroad completion.
