= Albion Methodist Church =

Historic church in Idaho, United States

- U.S. National Register of Historic Places
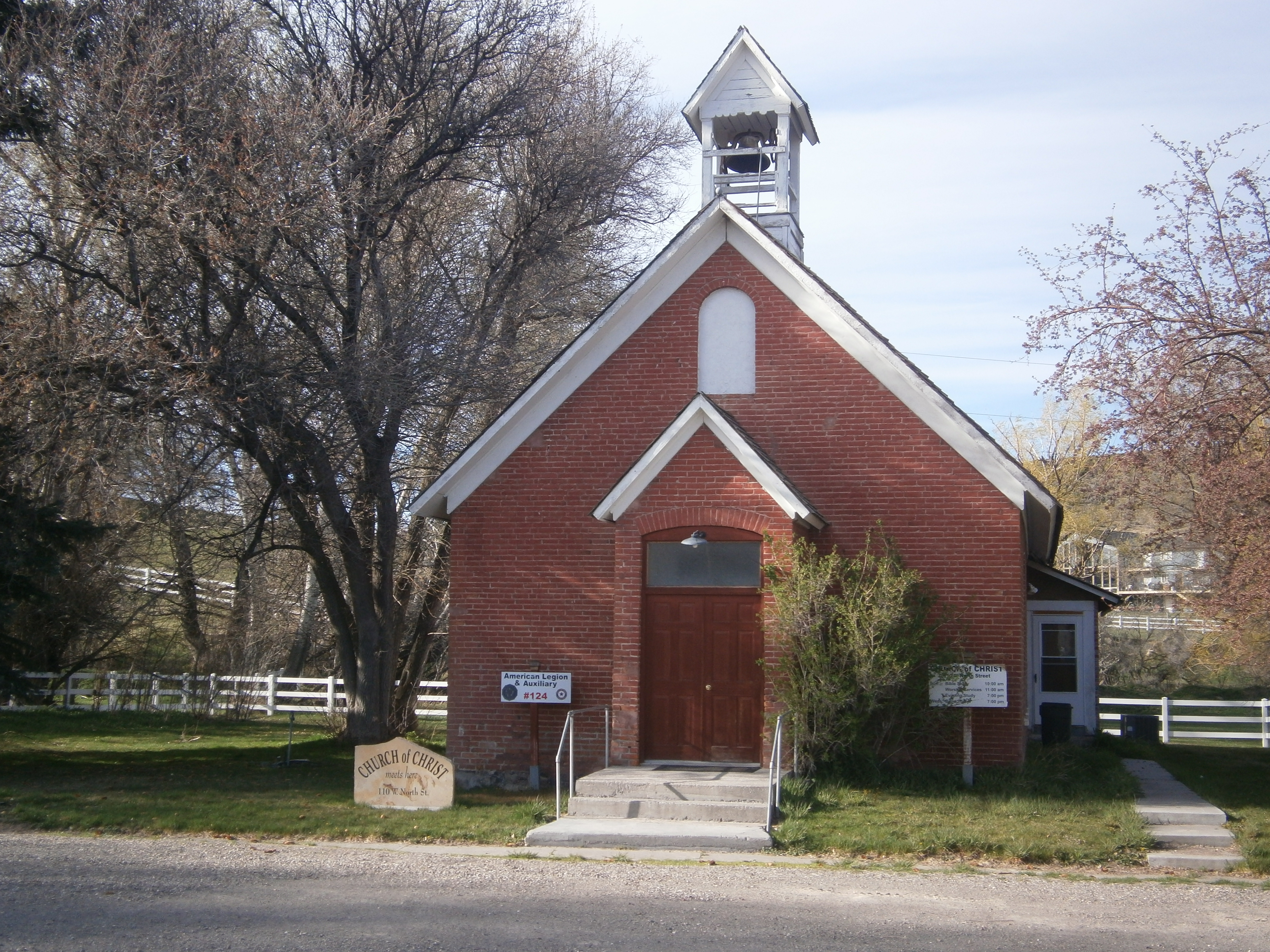

- Location within Idaho Location within the United States
- Location: 102 North St., Albion, Idaho
- Coordinates: 42°24′47″N 113°34′39″W
- Area: less than one acre
- Built: 1888-89
- NRHP reference No.: 86002161
- Added to NRHP: September 4, 1986

The Albion Methodist Church is a historic Methodist church located at 102 North St. in Albion, Idaho. The church was built in 1888-89 for Albion's Methodist congregation, which was established in 1878. The church's design is typical of vernacular rural churches built in Idaho at the time, featuring a gable front with a small belfry and a one-room interior. When the church opened, it became Albion's first institutional building; it remained one of the city's few public buildings for much of its early history and hosted other churches' services, public meetings, and classes at the Albion State Normal School. The church remained open through 1951, when it closed due to its inability to maintain an active congregation in a small town with a majority Mormon population.

The church was listed on the National Register of Historic Places on September 4, 1986.

== See also ==
- List of National Historic Landmarks in Idaho
- National Register of Historic Places listings in Cassia County, Idaho
