= Archie Teater Studio =

Historic house in Idaho, United States

- Archie Teater Studio (Teater's Knoll)
- U.S. National Register of Historic Places
- Location within Idaho
- Location: Bliss, Idaho
- Coordinates: 42°52′48″N 114°54′58″W
- Built: 1952
- Architect: Frank Lloyd Wright
- Architectural style: Usonian
- NRHP reference No.: 84001132
- Added to NRHP: September 13, 1984

The Archie Teater Studio, also known as Teater's Knoll, is a Usonian-style home and art studio in Bliss, Idaho, United States. Designed by Frank Lloyd Wright and commissioned in 1952 for American landscape and genre artist Archie Boyd Teater, it was completed in 1957. The Teater Studio uses Oakley Stone in both its exterior and interior. Original construction was supervised by Edmond Thomas "Tom" Casey, an apprentice in Wright's Taliesin Fellowship. The home was added to the National Register of Historic Places in 1984.

Current occupants of the studio are Lynn Fawcett, who grew up in the Wright designed Randall Fawcett House, and her husband, Henry Whiting II (an architectural writer). The two consulted with Tom Casey in the restoration and expansion of the building. Their work began in the 1980s and was completed the next decade.

== See also ==
- List of Frank Lloyd Wright works
- National Register of Historic Places listings in Gooding County, Idaho
