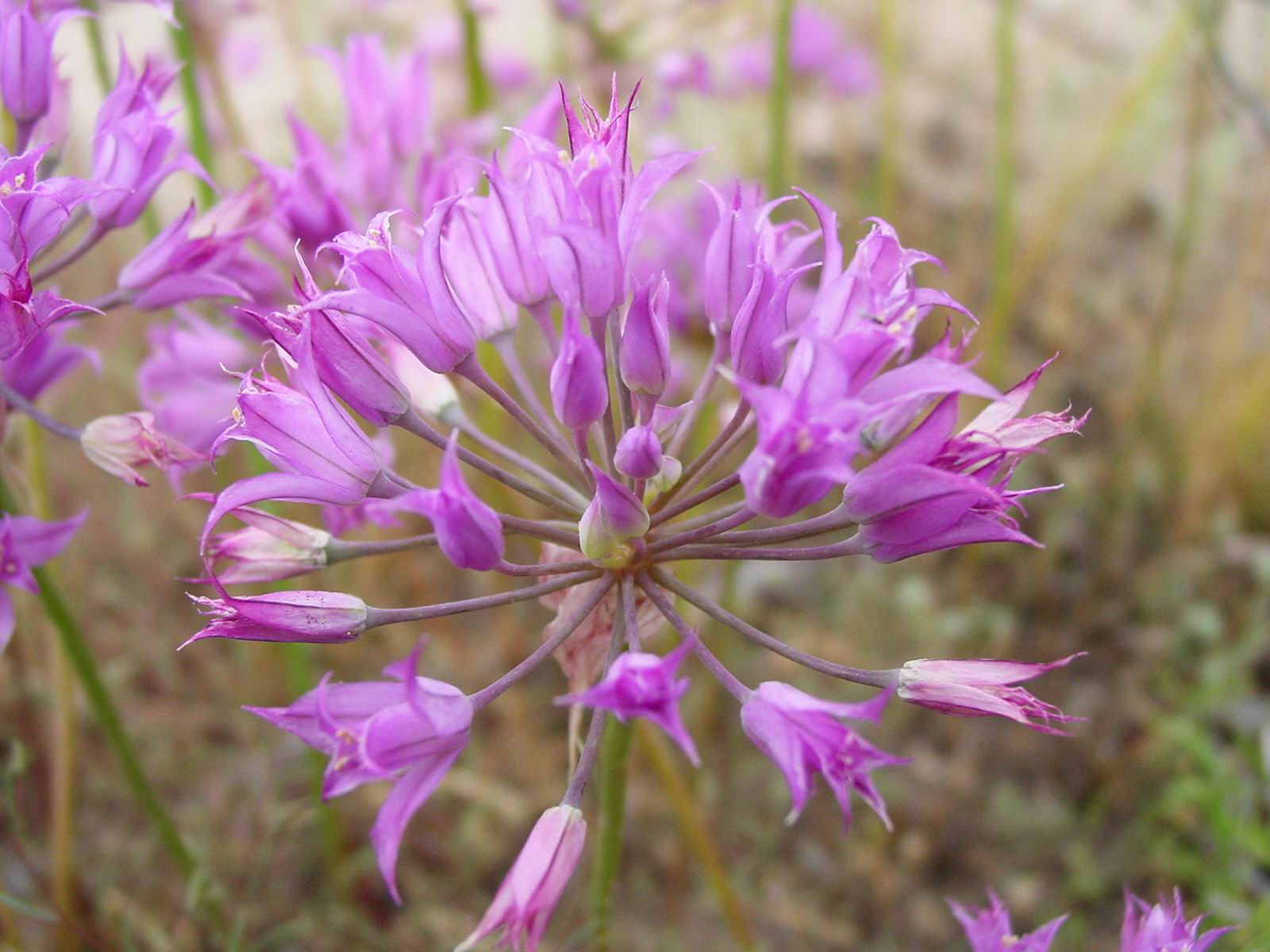

Conservation status
- Secure (NatureServe)

Scientific classification
- Kingdom: Plantae
- Clade: Tracheophytes
- Clade: Angiosperms
- Clade: Monocots
- Order: Asparagales
- Family: Amaryllidaceae
- Subfamily: Allioideae
- Genus: Allium
- Subgenus: A. subg. Amerallium
- Species: A. acuminatum

Binomial name
- Allium acuminatum Hook.

Synonyms
- Allium acuminatum var. cuspidatum Fernald; Allium cuspidatum (Fernald) Rydb.; Allium elwesii Regel; Allium murrayanum Regel; Allium wallichianum Regel

= Allium acuminatum =

Tapertip onion

Species of flowering plant

Allium acuminatum, also known as the tapertip onion or Hooker's onion, is a species in the genus Allium native to North America.

== Distribution ==
It is found the Western United States and Canada. It has been reported from every state west of the Rocky Mountains, plus British Columbia.

== Description ==
Allium acuminatum produces bulbs that are spherical, less than 2 cm across and smelling like onions. Scape is up to 40 cm tall, wearing an umbel of as many as 40 flowers. The flowers are pink to purple with yellow anthers. The plant also produces two or three grooved leaves which tend to wither prior to bloom. Its native habitats include open, rocky slopes, among brush and pines.

The onions were eaten by first peoples in southern British Columbia. They were harvested in either early spring or late fall and usually cooked in pits. Both the bulb and the flowering stalk are edible; however, in the culinary arts, the stalk possesses a more pleasant flavour.
