= Archie Boyd Teater =

American painter

Archie Boyd Teater (May 5, 1901 – July 18, 1978) was an American landscape and genre artist who painted in an impressionist style. He has been estimated to have painted more than 4000 paintings in his lifetime, making him one of the "most prolific painters in the U.S." His work featured western scenes, mining camps, Jackson Hole, the Teton Mountains, San Francisco buildings, and still lifes: strawberries, potatoes, and oranges.

Of the subsequent Jackson Hole artists, he is probably the best known. In terms of painting the Tetons and Jackson Hole, Archie is totally without peer.—Lester Taylor, a part-time Teton Valley resident.

== Biography ==
The first artist he ever saw was an itinerant 'potboiler' painter set up in the window of a store in his hometown. Another tale is that at age 15 he met a buckeye artist, one that travels and paints portraits for a living. His first canvas may have been cut from the covering of a sheepherder's wagon.

He repaired fences for ranchers in exchange for the weathered tops of wooden posts for use in carving. Some of his first paintings were destroyed by cork-soled boots of loggers, yet his first sale was to a lumberjack for fifty cents.

He lived in poverty as a child and young man, yet in the mid-1950s built the Archie Teater Studio, the only Frank Lloyd Wright house in the state of Idaho, and spent much of the last 20 years of his life traveling and painting in more than 100 countries, crossing the Atlantic on the Queen Elizabeth on one occasion, and on the Concord on another.

He died with a substantial estate, and his large personal collection of paintings was left to a foundation for handicapped children.

In September 1941, Teater married (Agnes) Patricia Wilson, who was two years his junior. Patricia Wilson had been in Jackson Hole during the summer of 1941 for health reasons, and was from a different social and educational background. Orphaned at a young age, she had been raised on the west side of Chicago by a wealthy but distant and unloving grandmother. She had degrees in journalism and geography, and had studied and traveled extensively in Europe. Their first winters after marriage were spent in New York City, where they lived in Greenwich Village and studied at the Art Students League, with Patricia taking sculpture lessons from William Zorach. The summers of 1943 and 1944 were spent painting in Ogunquit, Maine, and Rockport, Massachusetts. In the summer of 1945, they returned to Jackson Hole and opened a studio gallery on the Jackson town square. They kept a studio in Jackson until their deaths.

Despite having, after the late-1950s, a house designed by Frank Lloyd Wright on a bluff overlooking the Snake River near Hagerman, Idaho, the Teaters only real constant in terms of residence was the summers spent in Jackson Hole. At the end of a summer, they would usually spend several weeks in Idaho, either at their home in Hagerman or with friends in or around Boise. Before 1958, winters were spent traveling and painting in the U.S., but beginning in 1958 their travels were mostly international. Altogether, the Teaters visited some 115 countries of the world, and Teater sketched or painted in them all. The paintings from these travels formed what was called their 'International Collection', and came to include more than 500 oils. Because of deteriorating health, their permanent residence for the last few years of their lives was in Carmel, California.

In general, and especially after his marriage, Teater was a loner in terms of art. He was a member of no school, and except possibly in his New York years, he almost always painted by himself. He often gave clinics and demonstrations but never offered classes or formal instruction.

== Death ==
At the time of his death, he was one of the country's best-known western landscape artists. He had one-man shows in New York City. His paintings had hung in exhibitions at the Metropolitan, other museums and U.S. Embassies around the world. He had been featured in articles in Better Homes and Gardens, Cosmopolitan, Flair, Ideals, Look, and Quick Magazines. And, his paintings were in several important private collections, including: W. Averell Harriman, Lawrence Rockefeller, Godfrey Rockefeller, George S. Amory, Bennett Cerf, Henry P. Cole, and Mrs. Charles de Rham. Following his death, Teater's paintings seemed to be largely known only by the owners his work and the diminishing coterie of people predominately in Boise, Idaho, and Jackson Hole, Wyoming who personally knew him or his wife.

Teater was nomadic, using whatever employment opportunities to further his artistic ideas. When he was 14, he lived in a cave in Malad Canyon in the Thousand Springs region of the Snake River in south-western Idaho. When he was 15 and 16, he lived in a horse-drawn covered wagon. With his brothers, he built a corral in the Snake River to catch sturgeon that they could sell as food to mining companies for their crews. In the mid-1920s, he spent summers trekking with a string of pack burros through the Sawtooth Mountains prospecting for gold, sketching, and painting. By the summer of 1928, he had a Model T Ford and ventured for the first time into Jackson Hole, Wyoming, to paint the Grand Tetons. This visit initiated a lifelong love affair with the Tetons, and he spent, for the rest of his life, virtually every summer thereafter in Jackson Hole. He would start the summer season in the Tetons working for the U.S. Forest Service constructing trails in the then nascent Grand Teton National Park. He would stay at the job until he had a few dollars, then he would quit in order to spend the remainder of the summer painting. His first 'gallery' was on the shore of Jenny Lake at the base of the Tetons. In the mid-1940s he became known as 'Teton Teater' for his paintings of the Tetons. A ridge in the Tetons became known as 'Teater's Ridge' because of the considerable time he spent on it. In the late 1930s, his Jackson 'studio' was the bed of a truck parked near the creek on the north side of town. His 1941 'formal' gallery in Jackson was in a rental space in the Railway Express Office. He built a cabin next to the Town Square in Jackson Hole, with skylights to allow natural light in for his work, that still stands to this day and is registered as a historic landmark.

== Instruction ==
Teater's first formal art instruction began in the winter of 1921–22 when (using money he had accumulated from trapping mink and muskrat) he left Boise to study for two winters at the Portland Art Museum. His teachers at the Museum were Clara J. Stephens (1877–1952) and Henry F. Wentz (1876–1965). In the early 1930s, a number of eastern summer visitors in Jackson Hole felt that Teater would benefit from exposure to the New York art scene and urged him to go to New York for further training and study. Teater accordingly left Idaho for New York City in September 1935 and began the first of what would eventually become eight winters of study at the Art Students League (1935–37, 1942–45, and 1956). His patron saint enabling him to do was Frances (Mrs. Charles) de Rham, who lived on Park Avenue and had a ranch in Jackson Hole where she spent summers. His instructors at the Art Students League between 1935 and 1945 included Homer Boss (1882–1956), Alexander Brook (1898–1980), George Brandt Bridgman (1865–1943), John Carroll (1892–1959), Frank Vincent Dumond (1865–1951), Reginald Marsh (1898–1954), and William C. McNulty (1884–1963). His final formal study at the Art Students League was in early 1956, when he sat for four life classes from Edwin Dickensen (1891–1971), Ivan Olinsky (1878–1962), and Robert Philipp (1895–1981).

== Artworks ==
Teater was an enormously prolific painter and his lifetime output of paintings is estimated to be around 4,000 paintings, many in private collections. His subject matter was broad and included portraits, still lifes, nudes, animals, landscapes, coasts and seashores, cowboy and mining towns, city street scenes, barrooms and dance halls, mining and logging camps, range life, humor, fantasy and autobiography, natural, social and military history, and social commentary.

For the most part, Teater was a plein air artist, and the bulk of his painting was done on the scene in open air. He painted outdoors in every kind of weather, including rain, snow, sleet, and sub-zero temperatures. Teater painted entirely in oil, usually on canvas, but occasionally on wood or canvas board. His works have been featured in Better Homes and Gardens, Look, Flair, and Ideals. In his youth, he did a lot of wood carving and some sculpting, and at least one early painting exists that was carved in relief before being painted. However, in his mature years, his medium appears to have been exclusively oil. He may have written a few poems, and in addition left an unpublished novel that is an allegory of a couple of years of family life when he was a teenager living along the Snake River.

Teater's painting style has been described by commentator John Walker as "Post-Impressionistic Romantic" and by another as "The Burl Ives of Canvas". His scenes can be joyful and humorous, or they can be forlorn and mournful. His people and animals in compositions are often impressionistic swatches. Until his early 20s, he was totally self-taught. While it is clear that he was influenced by some of his teachers, and at times his oils were strongly impressionist, his style was that of a talented primitive.

== Sources ==
Papers and materials of Archie and Patricia Teater on deposit in the Idaho Historical Library in Boise, Idaho, articles in New York Times, New York Herald Tribune, Idaho Statesman, Salt Lake City Tribune, Jackson Hole Courier, Jackson Hole Guide, Jackson Hole News, and other newspapers, and interviews (conducted by Lester D. Taylor) with family members, friends, and acquaintances of Archie and Patricia Teater.

== See also ==
- Biography of Teaton Teater
- The Archie B. Teater collection
