= Granite Pass (Wyoming) =

Coordinates: 44°38′24″N 107°30′12″W

- Interactive map of Granite Pass
- Elevation: 9,033 ft (2,753 m)
- Traversed by: U.S. Highway 14

Third Approach
- Location: Big Horn / Sheridan counties, Wyoming, United States
- Range: Bighorn Mountains

Granite Pass (el. 9,033 feet (2,753 m)) is a mountain pass in the Bighorn Mountains in Wyoming traversed by U.S. Route 14, on the border between Big Horn and Sheridan counties.
