= United States Capitol Preservation Commission =

The United States Capitol Preservation Commission was established under Title VIII of Public Law 100-696 (2 U.S.C. § 2081) in November 1988 for the purpose of providing for improvements in, preservation of, and acquisitions (including works of fine art and other property for display) for the United States Capitol and other locations under the control of the Congress. In September 1999, the commission was given the responsibility, pursuant to Public Law 106–57, for approving the planning, engineering, design, and construction milestones of the Capitol Visitor Center (CVC). The CVC will be a facility, located under the East Plaza of the Capitol that is designed to enhance the experience of visitors to the Capitol through improved visitor orientation and related services, strengthened Capitol security, and integration of the center's design concepts with the appropriate improvements to the Capitol's East Plaza.

== Funding ==
Title VIII of Public Law 100-696 established the Capitol Preservation Fund (the Fund within the U.S. Treasury to finance improvement, preservation, and acquisition activities of the commission). In addition, in January 2002, the commission received authority to transfer amounts from the Fund to the Architect of the Capitol (AOC) for use in planning, engineering, design, or construction of the CVC, under Public Law 107–117. In April 2003, the Commission approved an authorization to the AOC to use $65 million from the Fund to fund a portion of the AOC's contract for Sequence 2 CVC construction.

The Fund's assets consist of amounts derived from charitable contributions and related pledges receivable, surcharge proceeds from the Secretary of the Treasury (U.S. Mint) arising from the sale of commemorative coins, and interest earned on the invested portions of the Fund's assets.

Fund assets not needed to finance current improvement, preservation, or acquisition projects are invested in interest-bearing obligations of the United States. The Fund's assets have not been used to fund management activities or raise funds.

Since its establishment, the Fund has been designated to receive coin surcharge proceeds from three commemorative coin programs authorized by the Congress. The commission is also exploring the use of funding for investments in new technologies that could enhance visitor experiences and improve preservation efforts.

- Prior to fiscal year 2002, the Fund received surcharge proceeds authorized by the Bicentennial of the United States Congress Commemorative Coin Act and the Bicentennial of the United States Capitol Commemorative Coin Act. These proceeds were received without restriction, deposited into the Fund and have been available to the Commission for use in funding approved improvement, preservation, and acquisition projects.
- In 1999, the Commission was designated to receive surcharge proceeds authorized by the United States Capitol Visitor Center Commemorative Coin Act. Proceeds received from this commemorative coin are restricted to use in the construction, maintenance, and preservation of the CVC. The CVC Commemorative Coin sales program ended in March 2002. All surcharge proceeds from this coin program have been received and deposited in the Fund.

== Function ==
In accordance with its rules, the Commission may fund or assist in the funding of improvements to the Capitol Building and surrounding grounds if such improvements are authorized, undertaken, and completed under the procedures established by the Congress for such purposes. With respect to works of fine art and other property for display, the commission is authorized to expend $400,000 ($200,000 for the House of Representatives and $200,000 for the Senate) for the purchase of art, furnishings, or items of historical interest, provided that such expenses are approved by a majority of the members of the commission from the body of Congress for which such purchases are made. However, the Commission may not maintain any collection of fine or decorative art, or other property, but may assist in the transfer of such items to a congressional entity (such as the Senate Commission on Art, the House of Representatives Fine Arts Board, or the Joint Committee on the Library) or facilitate the disposal of items. The commission is exploring the use of technology to enhance visitor experiences and improve preservation efforts.

== Administrative support ==
The AOC, the Senate Commission on Art, and the House of Representatives Fine Arts Board are required by Public Law 100-696 (1988) to provide staff support and assistance to the commission. As necessary, the AOC awards contracts and procures goods and services to complete projects approved by the commission and ensures that the project-related goods and services purchased from vendors are received. Similarly, the Library of Congress, pursuant to Public Law 101-45 (1989) (2 U.S.C. § 142i), is required to provide financial management services for the commission. These services include coordinating activities with the Department of the Treasury for the deposits, disbursements, investments, and management of the Fund. In addition to these congressional entities, the Secretary of the Senate and the Clerk of the House of Representatives, pursuant to Commission rules, provide general administrative-type support and assistance.

== Membership ==
The commission is composed of the following Members of Congress:

1. The President pro tempore of the Senate and the Speaker of the House of Representatives, who shall be co-chairmen.
2. The Chairman and Vice-Chairman of the Joint Committee on the Library.
3. The Chairman and the ranking minority party member of the Committee on Rules and Administration of the Senate, and the Chairman and the ranking minority party member of the Committee on House Oversight of the House of Representatives.
4. The majority leader and the minority leader of the Senate.
5. The majority leader and the minority leader of the House of Representatives.
6. The Chairman of the commission on the Bicentennial of the United States Senate and the Chairman of the Commission of the House of Representatives Bicentenary, to be succeeded upon expiration of such commissions, by a Senator or Member of the House of Representatives, as appropriate, appointed by the Senate or House of Representatives co-chairman of the commission, respectively.
7. One Senator appointed by the President pro tempore of the Senate and one Senator appointed by the minority leader of the Senate.
8. One Member of the House of Representatives appointed by the Speaker of the House of Representatives and one Member of the House of Representatives appointed by the minority leader of the House of Representatives.

In addition to the members listed above, the Architect of the Capitol participates in the activities of the commission, ex officio, and without the right to vote.

As of February 2006, the members of the Capitol Preservation Commission in the 109th Congress are:

- Co-chairmen: Senate President Pro Tempore Ted Stevens (Alaska); Speaker of the House Dennis Hastert (Illinois).
- United States Senate:

Bill Frist (R-TN), Majority Leader; Harry Reid (D-NV), Democratic Leader; Wayne Allard (R-CO), Chairman, Senate Appropriations Committee Subcommittee on Legislative Branch; Trent Lott (R-MS), Chairman, Senate Rules Committee; Bob Bennett (R-UT); Christopher Dodd (D-CT); Thad Cochran (R-MS); Richard Durbin (D-IL).

- United States House of Representatives:

John Boehner (R-OH), Majority Leader; Nancy Pelosi (D-CA), Democratic Leader; Jerry Lewis (R-CA), Chairman, Committee on Appropriations; Vernon Ehlers (R-MI), Chairman, Committee on House Administration; Juanita Millender-McDonald (D-CA), Ranking Member, Committee on House Administration; Bill Shuster (R-PA), Chairman, House Transportation Subcommittee on Economic Development, Public Buildings and Emergency Management; Marcy Kaptur (D-OH); John Mica (R-FL).

- Ex Officio Member: Alan Hantman, Architect of the Capitol

== Sources ==
- GAO Audit Report, Note 1 to financial statements
- Architect of the Capitol Site
