= Raft River =

River in Box Elder County, Utah and Cassia County, Idaho in the United States

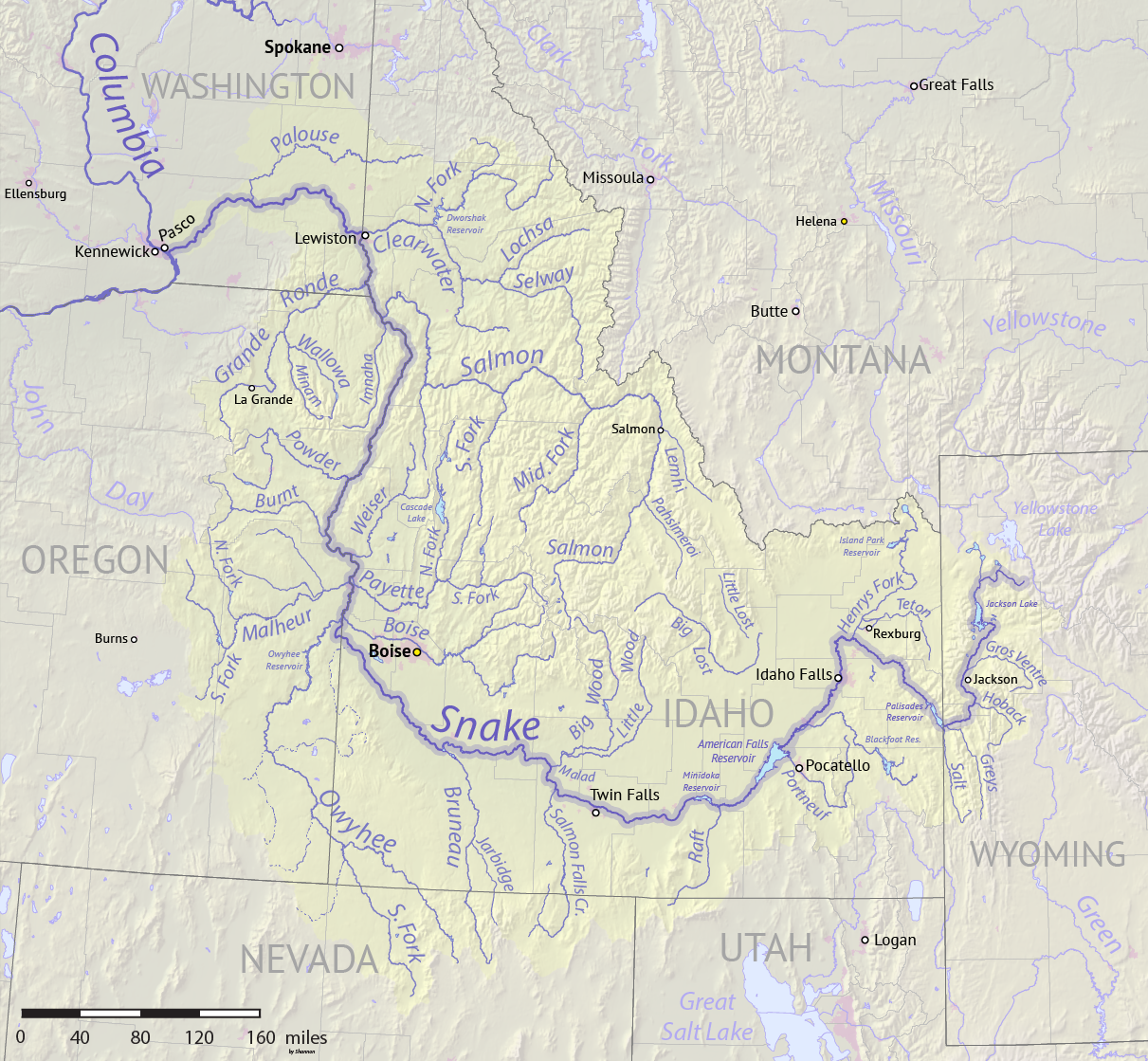
- Map of the Snake River watershed, USA

Location
- Country: United States
- State: Idaho / Utah

Physical characteristics
- Source: Albion Mountains
  - location: Cassia County, Idaho and Box Elder County, Utah
- Mouth: Snake River
  - location: Cassia County, Idaho
  - coordinates: 42°36′20″N 113°14′26″W

The Raft River is a 108-mile-long (174 km) tributary of the Snake River located in northern Utah and southern Idaho in the United States. It is part of the Columbia River Basin.

== Course ==
The Raft River's headwaters are mostly on the east side of the Albion Mountains, southeast of Oakley, Idaho. But its Clear Creek tributary also drains the north side of the Raft River Mountains in Utah, and runoff from the nearby Grouse Creek Range also flows into the Raft River. Portions of the Black Pine and Sublett mountains are also in the river's watershed. The river flows generally north to join the Snake River in Cassia County, Idaho.

== Watershed ==
The Raft River's drainage basin includes four divisions of Sawtooth National Forest, and is approximately 1,506 square miles (3,901 km^{2}) in area, of which approximately 95% of the overall area is in Idaho.

== History ==
The river is named for the fact Oregon Trail pioneers would cross the river with rafts, as it was often flooded as a result of beaver dams.

The Oregon Trail crossed the Raft River approximately 2 miles (3 km) south of Interstate 86. At the top of the bluff above Raft River, the "Parting of the Ways" took place. The Oregon Trail continued west, and the California Trail headed south. Graves of those who died from being mortally wounded at Massacre Rocks can be found in the same area along the river. The Clark Massacre of 1851 took place near the Raft River itself.

== See also ==
- List of rivers of Idaho
- List of longest streams of Idaho
- List of rivers of Utah
- Tributaries of the Columbia River
