= Granite Pass (California Trail) =

- U.S. National Register of Historic Places
- Location within Idaho Location within the United States
- Location: Southwest of Oakley, less than 0.5 miles north of the Utah boundary
- Nearest city: Oakley, Idaho
- Coordinates: 41°59′32″N 113°51′3″W
- Area: 160 acres (65 ha)
- NRHP reference No.: 72000439
- Added to NRHP: June 28, 1972

Granite Pass on the California Trail, located in what is now Cassia County, Idaho less than half a mile north of Utah, has historic significance dating to 1842 when it was found by Joseph B. Chiles to serve as an adequate emigrant trail route to come west toward California from the Oregon Trail route that went through Fort Hall. Chiles was then returning east to Fort Hall in a small group that dropped out of the Bartleson–Bidwell Party, the first group attempting to emigrate with wagons from Missouri to California. The Granite Pass can be seen from far away, coming from that direction. When Chiles brought a west-bound wagon group through the pass in 1843 it became established. The California Trail eventually evolved and went through this pass; Chiles led seven different groups through the pass. When first used for emigrants as a wagon trail, it was part of Mexico.

A 160-acre (65 ha) area at the pass was listed on the National Register of Historic Places in 1972.
