= Raft River Valley =

Valley in Cassia County, Idaho and Box Elder County, Utah in the United States

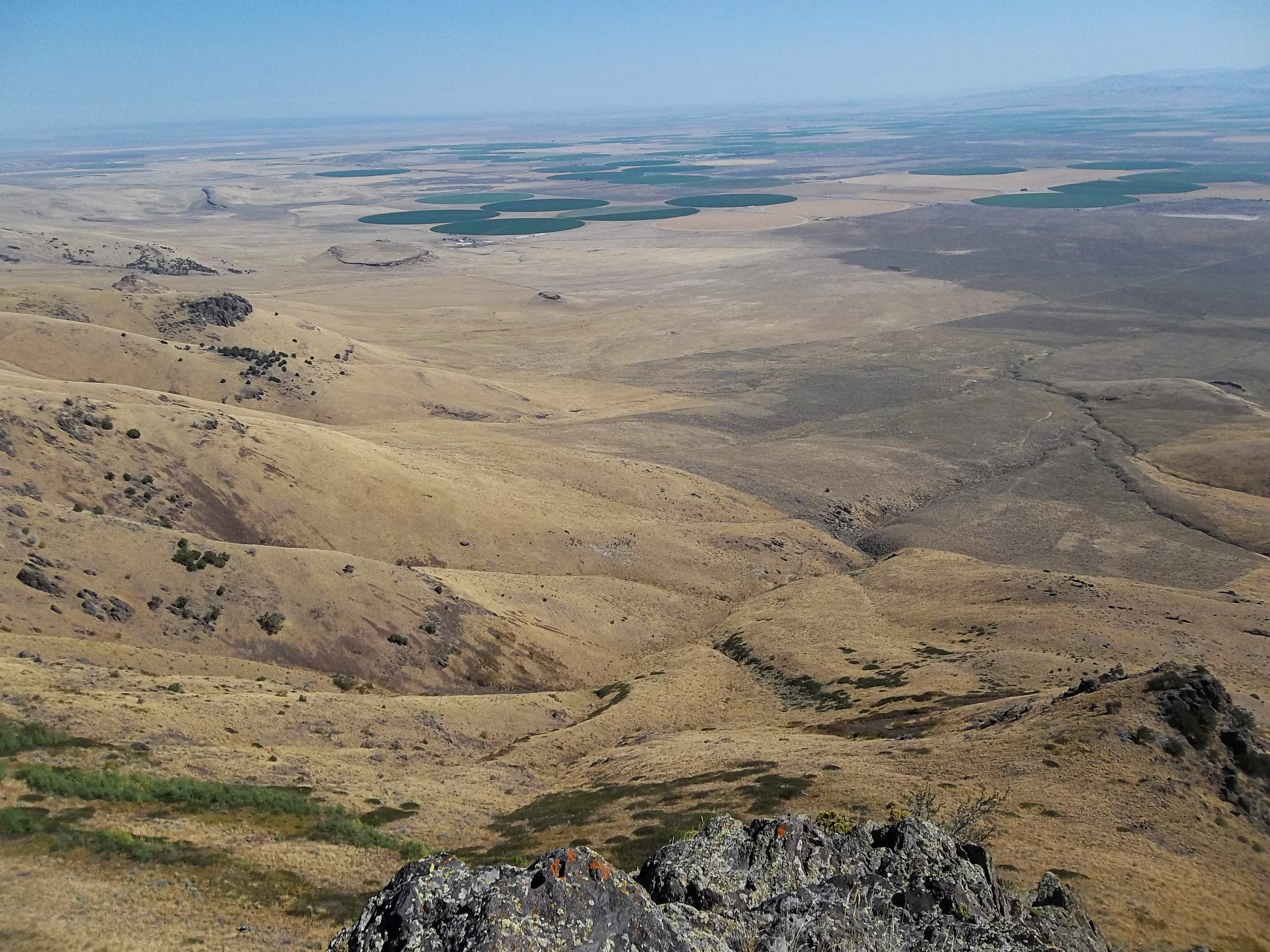
- Raft River Valley from Cotterel, September 2012

- Location within Idaho Location within the United States
- Floor elevation: 4,200 feet (1,300 m)

Geography
- Location: Cassia County, Idaho and Box Elder County, Utah in the United States
- Population centers: Malta
- Coordinates: 42°36′25″N 113°14′25″W
- Traversed by: Interstate 84, Interstate 86
- Interactive map of Raft River Valley

The Raft River Valley is a valley in Cassia County, Idaho and Box Elder County, Utah in the United States.

== Description ==
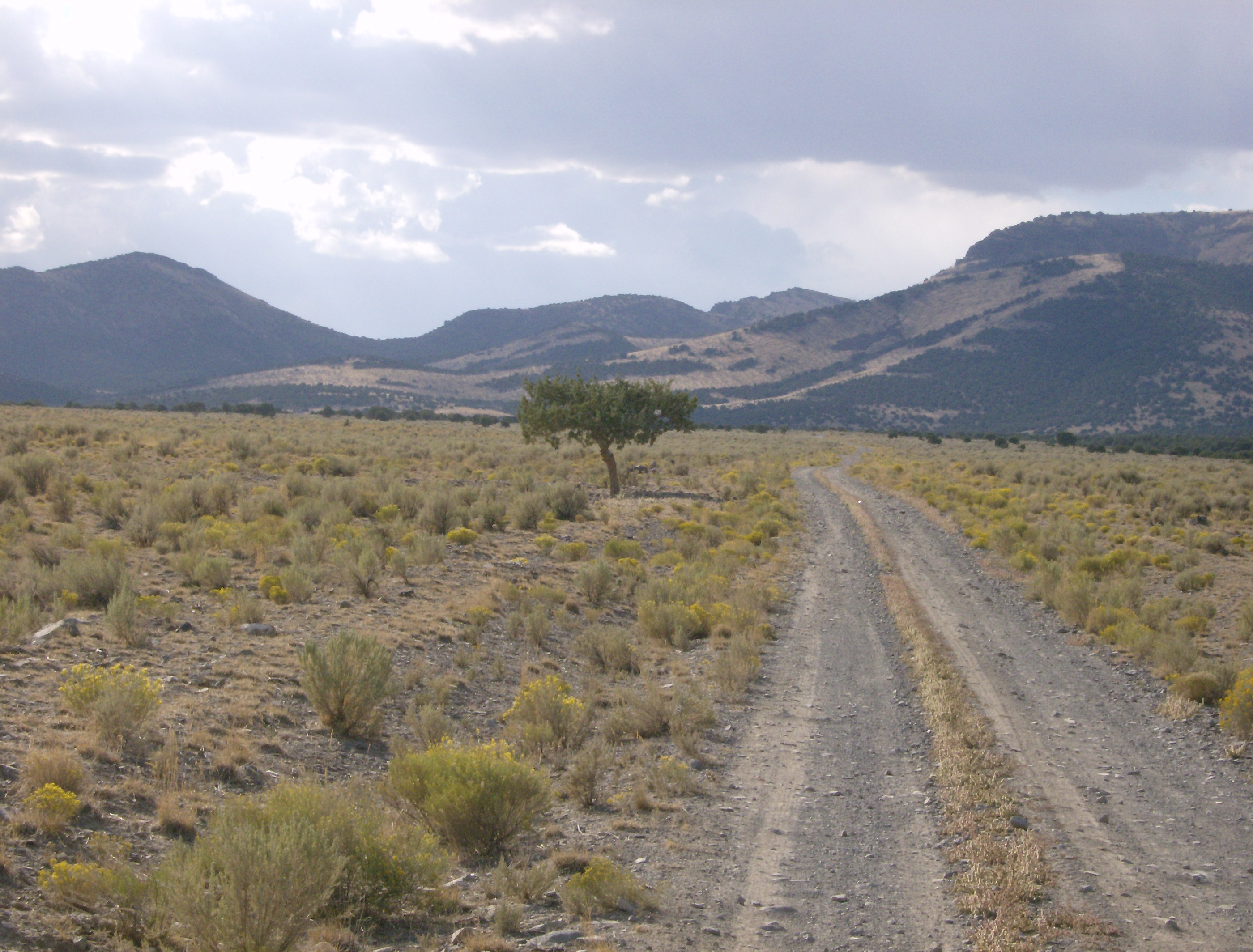
Dirt road in the Raft River Valley, October 2008

The valley is bounded by the Sublett Range on the northern east, the Black Pine Mountains on the southern east, the Raft River Mountains on the south, the Upper Raft River Valley on the very southern west, the Jim Sage Mountains on the southern west, the Cotterel Mountains on the northern west, and the Snake River on the north.

The Raft River flows north through most of the valley.

The valley is traversed northwest–southeast by Interstate 84 and northwest–northeast by Interstate 86. Portions of Idaho State Highway 77 and Idaho State Highway 81 also located in the valley.

Communities within the valley include the city of Malta; the unincorporated communities of Idahome, Raft River, Standrod, and Sublett; and the ghost town of Strevell, all of which (except Standrod) are located in Idaho.

== History ==
The area briefly had a post office (1878-1879) under the name Raft River Bridge, located on Interstate 86/U.S. Route 30, about 25 miles (40 km) southwest of American Falls.
