= Cassia Creek =

- Location in Idaho Location in the United States

Location
- Country: United States
- State: Idaho
- Counties: Cassia

Physical characteristics
- Source: Confluence of the New Canyon Creek and Flat Canyon Creek
  - location: Albion Mountains, midway between Oakley and Malta
  - coordinates: 42°15′13″N 113°39′51″W
- Mouth: Raft River
  - location: Raft River Valley, north–northeast of Malta
  - coordinates: 42°20′52″N 113°21′18″W
  - elevation: 4,449 ft (1,356 m)

Basin features
- Progression: Raft River→ Snake River→ Columbia River→ Pacific Ocean
- Tributaries
  - left: New Canyon Creek
  - right: Flat Canyon Creek

Cassia Creek is a stream in Cassia County, Idaho, United States, that is a tributary of the Raft River (a tributary of the Snake River).

== Description ==
Rising in the Albion Mountains within the Sawtooth National Forest (about midway between the cities of Oakley and Malta) Cassia Creek flows easterly to quickly leave the national forest and then pass along the western edge of the unincorporataed community of Elba. It then flows northeasterly between the Albion Mountains (on northwest) and the Jim Sage Mountains (on the southeast), roughly paralleling Idaho State Highway 77 Spur, until it passes south of the unincorporated community of Connor.

From Connor, the creek flows easterly again (with the Cotterel Mountains on the north and the Jim Sage Mountains on the south) out of the mountains and into the Raft River Valley as it roughly parallels Idaho State Highway 77 (SH‑77). The creek then flows northeasterly in the Raft River Valley (still roughly paralleling SH‑77) to pass along the southeastern edge of city of Malta. Finally, it flows northerly through agricultural land in the Raft River Valley to its mouth on the Raft River, about 3 miles (4.8 km) north–northeast of Malta. (The Raft River flows north to the Snake River, a tributary of the Columbia River.)

Most of Cassia Creek is along a section of the California Trail. The creek is a recommended fishing water by the Idaho Department of Fish and Game.

== See also ==
- List of rivers of Idaho
