= Idaho State Highway 77 =

State highway in Cassia County, Idaho, United States

State Highway 77

Route information
- Maintained by ITD
- Length: 30.676 mi (49.368 km)

Major junctions
- South end: SH-81 in Malta
- SH-77 Spur in Connor; SH-81 in Declo
- North end: I-84 / US 30 / SH-25 north of Declo

Location
- Country: United States
- State: Idaho
- Counties: Cassia

Highway system
- Idaho State Highway System; Interstate; US; State
← SH-75	→ SH-78

State Highway 77 (SH-77) is a 30.676-mile (49.368 km) state highway in Cassia County, Idaho, United States, that connects Idaho State Highway 81 (SH-81) in Malta with Interstate 84/U.S. Route 30 (I-84/US 30) north of Declo, via Albion. The highway also has a spur that runs from City of Rocks Road (south of Almo) to SH-77 in Connor.

== Route description ==
SH-77 begins at an intersection with the southern end of SH-81 in the city of Malta in the Raft River Valley. (From the southern terminus of SH-77, SH-81 [North Main Street] heads north toward Declo; South Main Street heads south toward Cedar Creek and Snowville in Utah; and Central Street heads east for a few blocks before ending. South Main Street and North Main Street [SH-81] were the routing of the former U.S. Route 30S. SH-81 also previously continued south along South Main Street to connect with the west end of Utah State Route 42, northwest of Cedar Creek.)

From its southern terminus, SH-77 heads west along Central Street within Malta before leaving the city limits and heading southwest for roughly 4 miles (6.4 km) until it briefly runs between Cassia Creek on the south and the Cotterel Mountains on the north. Nearly 4 miles (6.4 km) later SH-77 reaches a T intersection with SH-77 Spur in the unincorporated community of Connor. (SH-77 Spur heads south–southwesterly toward Alamo and the City of Rocks National Reserve.) From its junction, SH-77 Spur, SH-77 heads northerly out of Connor as the City of Rocks Back Country Byway for about 3.4 miles (5.5 km) between the Albion Mountains (on the west) and the Cotterel Mountains (on the east). SH-77 then heads north–northwesterly for roughly seven and a half miles (12.1 km) until it enters the Magic Valley reginoon of Idahoa and then reaches the city of Albion.

After entering Albion, SH-77 runs north along Main Street until it reaches North Street and turns west along that road. About two blocks west, SH-77 turns northwesterly and leaves Albion. After nearly 4 miles (6.4 km), and passing between the East Hills (on the northeast) and the Albion Mountains (on the southwest), SH-77 reaches East 500 South. After crossing that road, SH-77 heads north along 850 East for about 4 miles (6.4 km) until it reaches the city of Declo. Upon entering Declo, SH-77 continues north along Clark Street. On the northern edge of the main part of the city, SH-77 crosses SH-81, the same highway that has a common southern terminus with SH-77. (From the intersection SH-81 heads east toward Malta and west toward Burley.)

North of its junction with SH-81 in Delco, SH-77 continues north for a few more blocks before leaving the city limits and continuing north along 850 East. After about 2.3 miles (3.7 km) SH-77 nears the southern bank of the Snake River and then jogs very briefly to the east before continuing north again to quickly reach its northern terminus at a diamond interchange with I-84 (Vietnam Veterans Memorial Highway)/US 30 and SH-25. (I-84/US 30 heads east from the interchange toward a junction with Interstate 86, and then on toward Pocatello and Ogden in Utah. I-84/US 30 heads west toward Heyburn, Burley, and Twin Falls. SH-25 heads north toward Rupert and Paul.)

== Major intersections ==
The entire route is in Cassia County.

Location	mi	km	Destinations	Notes
Malta	0.000	0.000	Central Street east	Continuation east from southern terminus
Malta	0.000	0.000	SH-81 north (North Main Street) – Declo, Burley, Twin Falls; South Main Street south – Cedar Creek (Utah), Snowville (Utah)	Southern terminus; southern end of SH-81; South Main Street and North Main Street (SH-81) are the routing of the former U.S. Route 30S; South Main Street also the former routing of SH-81
Connor	7.497	12.065	SH-77 Spur south – Elba, Almo, City of Rocks National Reserve	SH-77 Spur initially heads west from the intersection
Declo	27.296	43.929	SH-81 east – Malta SH-81 west – Burley	
	30.676	49.368	I-84 east (Vietnam Veterans Memorial Highway) / US 30 east – I-86, Pocatello, Ogden (Utah) I-84 west (Vietnam Veterans Memorial Highway) / US 30 west – Heyburn, Burley, Twin Falls	Northern terminus; diamond interchange, just east of the Snake River; I-84 exit 216
	30.676	49.368	SH-25 north – Rupert, Paul	Continuation north from northern terminus; southern end of SH-25
1.000 mi = 1.609 km; 1.000 km = 0.621 mi

== Spur route ==
State Highway 77 Spur
- Location: Almo–Connor
- Length: 16.654 mi (26.802 km)
- Tourist routes: City of Rocks Back Country Byway

SH-77 Spur is a 16.654-mile (26.802 km) spur route of SH-77 that connects City of Rocks Road (East 825 South), south of Almo) with SH-77 in Connor, via Elba. The highway serves the City of Rocks National Reserve and is part of the City of Rocks Back Country Byway. The byway follows the route of the California Trail as it approached Nevada.

== Spur route description ==
SH-77 Spur begins at an T intersection with City of Rocks Road (East 3075 South) and Lynn Road (South 825 East) in the Upper Raft River Valley, immediately south of the unincorporated community of Almo. (City of Roads Road heads west toward the City of Rocks National Reserve and Lynn Road heads south toward Lynn, Utah.) From its southern terminus SH-77 Spur heads north and through Almo, turning north–northeasterly in the northern part of the community, before leaving Almo.

After about 1.6 miles (2.6 km) along its north–northeasterly heading and just after crossing Edwards Creek, SH-77 Spur heads northeast for about 2 miles (3.2 km) before resuming a north–northeasterly heading for approximately 3.4 miles (5.5 km). SH-77 Spur then heads northerly for roughly 4.7 miles (7.6 km) to reach the unincorporated community of Elba. Just south of the central part of Elba, SH-77 Spur resumes a northeasterly, heading quickly leaving the community. After about 4 miles (6.4 km) along the northeasterly heading, and running roughly parallel with and then crossing over Cassia Creek, SH-77 Spur reaches it northern terminus at a T intersection with SH-77 in Connor. (SH-77 heads north from the intersection toward Albion and Declo and east toward Malta and Idahome.)

=== Major spur intersections ===
The entire route is in Cassia County.

Location	mi	km	Destinations	Notes
	0.000	0.000	South Lynn Road south (South 825 East) – Lynn (Utah)	Continuation south from southern terminus
	0.000	0.000	City of Rocks Road west (East 3075 South) – City of Rocks National Reserve	Southern spur terminus; T intersection
	15.853	25.513	Bridge over Cassia Creek	
Connor	16.654	26.802	SH-77 north – Albion, Declo SH-77 east – Malta, Idahome	Northern spur terminus; T intersection; SH-77
1.000 mi = 1.609 km; 1.000 km = 0.621 mi

== See also ==
- List of state highways in Idaho
