= Upper Raft River Valley =

Valley in Cassia County, Idaho and Box Elder County, Utah in the United States

- Location within Idaho Location within the United States
- Floor elevation: 5,004 feet (1,525 m)

Geography
- Location: Cassia County, Idaho and Box Elder County, Utah in the United States
- Population centers: Almo
- Coordinates: 41°58′41″N 113°36′38″W
- Interactive map of Upper Raft River Valley

The Upper Raft River Valley is a valley in Cassia County, Idaho and Box Elder County, Utah in the United States.

== Description ==
The valley is bounded by the Jim Sage Mountains on the northeast, the Raft River Valley on the southern east, the Raft River Mountains on the south, the Ceder Hills on the southern west, and the Albion Mountains on the northwest.

The Raft River flows northeast through the valley.

Idaho State Highway 77 Spur runs through the northernmost part of the valley.

Almo, Idaho is an unincorporated communities within the valley.
