= Crystal Peak (Box Elder County, Utah) =

Mountain in Utah, United States

- Location within Utah

Highest point
- Elevation: 7,780 feet (2,371 m)
- Prominence: 354 ft (108 m)
- Parent peak: Bull Mountain
- Coordinates: 41°55′07″N 113°13′38″W

Geography
- Location: Box Elder County, Utah, U.S.
- Parent range: Raft River Mountains
- Topo map: USGS Kelton Pass

Climbing
- Easiest route: Simple scramble, class 2

Crystal Peak, at 7,780 feet (2,370 m), is a peak in the Raft River Mountains of Utah. The peak is located in Box Elder County and the area designated as Sawtooth National Forest, but the U.S. Forest Service does not own or manage the land on and around the peak. It is located 7.1 mi (11.4 km) east of Bull Mountain. No roads or trails go to the summit.

The summit took its name from Crystal Spring.
