= Black Pine Cone =

Mountain in Idaho, United States

- Location within Idaho

Highest point
- Elevation: 8,020 ft (2,440 m)
- Prominence: 800 ft (240 m)
- Parent peak: Black Pine Peak
- Coordinates: 42°04′56″N 113°03′36″W

Geography
- Location: Cassia County, Idaho, U.S.
- Parent range: Raft River Mountains
- Topo map: USGS Black Pine Peak

Climbing
- Easiest route: Simple scramble, class 2

Black Pine Cone, at 8,020 feet (2,440 m) above sea level is a peak in the Black Pine Mountains of Idaho. The peak is located in Sawtooth National Forest in Cassia County. It is located about 2.5 mi (4.0 km) east of Black Pine Peak. No roads or trails go to the summit.
