= Sublett Range High Point =

Mountain in Idaho, United States

- Location within Idaho

Highest point
- Elevation: 7,492 ft (2,284 m)
- Prominence: 1,952 ft (595 m)
- Coordinates: 42°22′12″N 112°55′50″W

Geography
- Location: Power County, Idaho, U.S.
- Parent range: Sublett Range
- Topo map: USGS Sublett Troughs

Sublett Range High Point, at 7,492 feet (2,284 m) above sea level is the highest peak in the Sublett Range of Power County in southern Idaho, USA. It is located in the east-central part of the range north of Snowville, Utah, east of Malta, Idaho, and south of American Falls, Idaho, in the Sublett Division of the Minidoka Ranger District of Sawtooth National Forest.

Sublett Range High Point is in the watershed of tributaries of the Snake River, which itself is a tributary to the Columbia River. The view from the peak includes the Raft River, the Albion and Black Pine mountain ranges. The peak is a part of the Great Basin Divide and the Basin and Range Province. Interstate 84 passes to the west of the peak.
