= Bull Mountain =

Bull Mountain may refer to:

== Places in the United States ==
- Bull Mountain, Oregon, a hill and an unincorporated community in Oregon
- Bull Mountain (Box Elder County, Utah), a mountain in Utah
- Bull Mountain (Garfield County, Utah), a mountain in Utah
- Bull Mountains, a mountain range in Montana

== Other uses ==
- Bull Mountain (instruction), code name for Intel's hardware random number generator and for the RdRand instruction it feeds
- Bull Mountain, a novel by the American Brian Panowich

== See also ==
- Bull Run Mountains, a mountain range in Virginia, US
- Bull Run Mountains (Nevada), a mountain range US
- Gustav Bull Mountains, mountain peaks in Mac. Robertson Land, Antarctica
- Bull Hill, or Mount Taurus, a mountain in the State of New York, US
