= Connor Creek =

Connor Creek may refer to:

- Connor Creek, Alberta, a locality in Canada
- Connor Creek, an alternate name for Connor, Idaho, an unincorporated community in Cassia County, Idaho, United States
