= Black Pine Peak =

Mountain in Idaho, United States

- Location within Idaho

Highest point
- Elevation: 9,386 ft (2,861 m)
- Prominence: 186 ft (57 m)
- Parent peak: Black Pine Mountains High Point
- Coordinates: 42°07′13″N 113°07′15″W

Geography
- Location: Cassia County, Idaho, U.S.
- Parent range: Raft River Mountains
- Topo map: USGS Black Pine Peak

Climbing
- Easiest route: Simple scrambling, class 2

Black Pine Peak, at 9,386 feet (2,861 m) above sea level is a peak in the Black Pine Mountains of Idaho. The peak is located in Sawtooth National Forest in Cassia County about 1.3 mi (2.1 km) south of Black Pine Mountains High Point. No roads or trails go to the summit.
