= Black Pine Mountains High Point =

Mountain in Cassia County, Idaho, United States

Black Pine Mtns. HP
- Location within Idaho

Highest point
- Elevation: 9,389 ft (2,862 m)
- Prominence: 4,069 ft (1,240 m)
- Coordinates: 42°08′19″N 113°07′32″W

Geography
- Location: Cassia County, Idaho, U.S.
- Parent range: Black Pine Mountains
- Topo map: USGS Sweetzer Canyon

Black Pine Mountains High Point, at 9,289 feet (2,831 m) above sea level, is the highest peak in the Black Pine Mountains of Cassia County in southern Idaho. The high point is sometimes referred to as "Black Peak" because of a benchmark on the peak that reads "Black".

Black Pine Mountains High Point is located in the north-central part of the range northwest of Snowville, Utah, and southeast of Malta in the Black Pine Division of the Minidoka Ranger District of Sawtooth National Forest.

Black Pine Mountains High Point is in the watershed of tributaries of the Snake River, which itself is a tributary of the Columbia River. Views from the peak encompass the Raft River, Albion, Sublett, and Wasatch mountain ranges. The peak is a part of the Great Basin Divide and the Basin and Range Province. Interstate 84 passes to the east of the peak.
