= George Peak =

Mountain in Utah, United States

- Location within Utah

Highest point
- Elevation: 9,606 ft (2,928 m) NAVD 88
- Prominence: 581 ft (177 m)
- Parent peak: Bull Mountain
- Coordinates: 41°53′22″N 113°28′59″W

Geography
- Location: Box Elder County, Utah, U.S.
- Parent range: Raft River Mountains
- Topo map: USGS Standrod

Climbing
- Easiest route: Four wheel drive road

George Peak, at 9,606 feet (2,928 m), is the second highest peak in the Raft River Mountains of Utah. The peak is located in Sawtooth National Forest and Box Elder County. It is 6.2 mi (10.0 km) west of Bull Mountain and can be accessed via forest road 009, which travels near the summit.

== Climate ==
George Creek is a SNOTEL weather station situated on the northern face of George Peak, at an elevation of 9005 feet (2745 m). George Creek has a subalpine climate (Köppen Dfc), bordering on a humid continental climate (Köppen Dfb).

Climate data for George Creek, Utah, 2011–2020 normals: 9005ft (2745m)
Month	Jan	Feb	Mar	Apr	May	Jun	Jul	Aug	Sep	Oct	Nov	Dec	Year
Mean daily maximum °F (°C)	26.5 (−3.1)	26.0 (−3.3)	34.4 (1.3)	39.9 (4.4)	48.7 (9.3)	61.9 (16.6)	71.9 (22.2)	70.4 (21.3)	59.8 (15.4)	44.0 (6.7)	32.9 (0.5)	24.3 (−4.3)	45.1 (7.3)
Daily mean °F (°C)	19.9 (−6.7)	18.9 (−7.3)	26.0 (−3.3)	30.5 (−0.8)	39.5 (4.2)	50.6 (10.3)	60.7 (15.9)	59.5 (15.3)	50.1 (10.1)	36.1 (2.3)	26.3 (−3.2)	18.0 (−7.8)	36.3 (2.4)
Mean daily minimum °F (°C)	13.4 (−10.3)	11.8 (−11.2)	17.6 (−8.0)	21.1 (−6.1)	30.3 (−0.9)	39.3 (4.1)	49.5 (9.7)	48.5 (9.2)	40.3 (4.6)	28.1 (−2.2)	19.6 (−6.9)	11.6 (−11.3)	27.6 (−2.4)
Average precipitation inches (mm)	3.82 (97)	3.32 (84)	3.66 (93)	3.67 (93)	3.49 (89)	1.11 (28)	0.89 (23)	1.51 (38)	1.89 (48)	2.54 (65)	2.53 (64)	3.49 (89)	31.92 (811)
Source 1: XMACIS2
Source 2: NOAA (Precipitation)
