= Almo, Idaho Indian massacre myth =

The Almo, Idaho Indian massacre is an attack that is alleged to have occurred in 1861 when a band of Native Americans attacked a wagon train of 300 overland migrants in the Washington Territory, what is now southern Idaho. But unlike other massacres involving Native Americans in the 19th century, there is not enough substantial evidence to conclude that a massacre of this magnitude actually occurred near Almo in 1861. A monument in the small town of Almo was erected in 1938 by the Sons and Daughters of Idaho Pioneers. The monument stands in the memory of the travelers who were supposedly murdered in the massacre. The endurance of the myth and the monument that is built to remember the "massacre" engenders negative feelings among Native Americans, a group that has historically experienced persecution at the hands of white settlers. The monument itself displays 19th and 20th century attitudes towards Native Americans, and Native Americans believe that this monument needs to be removed, as it falsely represents Native peoples and cultures and contributes to the misinformation prevalent about Native Americans.

== Background ==
Map of the area which the Shoshone tribe covered in modern day Idaho, Wyoming, Utah, and Nevada

According to the legend of the massacre, a wagon train of about 300 migrants on the trail west to California, near Almo Creek in modern-day Southern Idaho, was attacked by a band of Native Americans of the Shoshone tribe, particularly the Northern Shoshone, which were native to the area. Once the last wagon cleared the creek, the attacking Native Americans surrounded train to cut them from the creek, their nearest source of water. The Shoshones terrorized the pioneers by shooting them with arrows or bullets if they tried to escape. By this point, the migrants had moved their wagons into a circle with the animals inside to defend themselves from the onslaught. While under siege, the migrants desperately attempted to dig wells to find water, but their efforts proved futile. The siege that the Shoshone laid upon the wagon train continued for days, killing off nearly all of the members of the wagon train, with the exception of two men, three women, and a baby, who escaped to Brigham, Utah, now known as Brigham City, Utah. A rescue party was sent from Utah, but upon arrival they found no survivors and the wagons looted. The bodies of those killed were buried in the wells that were dug.

== Skepticism ==
Since the 15th century, the populations of indigenous peoples on the North American continent have declined due to conflicts between Native Americans and European settlers, both intentional and unintentional. Aggressions from white people towards Native Americans and from Native Americans towards whites often resulted in casualties on both sides, but typically exacted heavier tolls among the Natives. If true, the Almo massacre would be an uncommon instance of Natives killing a large number of white settlers; however, there is little evidence to corroborate the occurrence of the massacre.

Historian Brigham Madsen notes that the earliest telling of the story of the massacre was recorded by Charles Walgamott in 1927, more than 60 years after the massacre allegedly occurred. No records of the event were left by the five supposed survivors nor the inhabitants in Brigham, Utah, the community to which they reportedly fled. There is also no evidence concerning the lives of the three hundred pioneers before they began their westward journey, other than that their journey began on the Missouri River, and was headed for California. Additionally, Walgamott's account fails to provide the wagon trains' purpose in trekking west.

Attacks from Native Americans that resulted in the deaths of white people were usually reported in local newspapers near where the massacres occurred, yet there are no known newspaper reports of what supposedly happened at Almo Creek. A massacre of this magnitude would be one of the most infamous of its kind in United States history, but the lack of evidence makes it difficult to accept as a factual and historical event by historians. This complication in turn makes it hard to widely recognize. The alleged incident near Almo is absent from a long list of violent engagements between Native Americans and whites during the second half of the nineteenth century and into the twentieth century, according to National Geographic. Additionally, the absence of mass graves near Almo that would indicate the massacre did occur has caused the site to be left out of a list of graves and monumental sites along the California and Oregon trails.

If the massacre did not happen, one explanation for the origins of the story comes from the poor relations between Native Americans and western settlers in the 19th century. Although there were positive and neutral interactions between Native Americans and western settlers, negative and occasional violent interactions grew more frequent on the California and Oregon trails in the mid-19th century. Journal entries from overland pioneers on the Oregon trail indicate that there was an increase in the fear of attacks from Native Americans. John D. Unruh noted that the number of emigrants killed by Native Americans and Native Americans killed by emigrants steadily increased between 1840 and 1860.

There were other accounts of violence between emigrants and Native Americans that occurred near Almo in September 1860 and September 1862 that were both reported in the Deseret News. The year 1861 was described as a quiet season, but skirmishes between Native Americans and whites were reported to have happened in the area in 1862, according to newspapers in both Nevada Territory and California.

Although there was an increase in attacks and in the number of emigrants killed, reports of the attacks were often embellished or distorted to put Native Americans in a negative light. An example of this was a better-attested skirmish that was started by some members of the Shoshone tribe attacking a wagon train on August 9, 1862, near the Snake River in southeastern Idaho in which eight overland emigrants and about twenty Native Americans were killed. Despite there being more Native Americans killed, the attack was labeled a "massacre" by white people and they demanded the government take action. No thought was given to the injustices that the Shoshone were suffering. The location of this attack is near what is now referred to as Massacre Rocks in Idaho, the name of which shows that it has been exaggerated to a greater degree than what initially occurred. To create and spread the story of the Almo massacre may have been part of an effort to portray Native Americans in a negative way like the August 1862 attack was inflated to "massacre" status. Historian James Loewen noted that portraying Native Americans in such a negative manner falls into a popular, though offensive, stereotype of "savage Indians" that grew in the late 19th and early 20th centuries.

== Monument ==
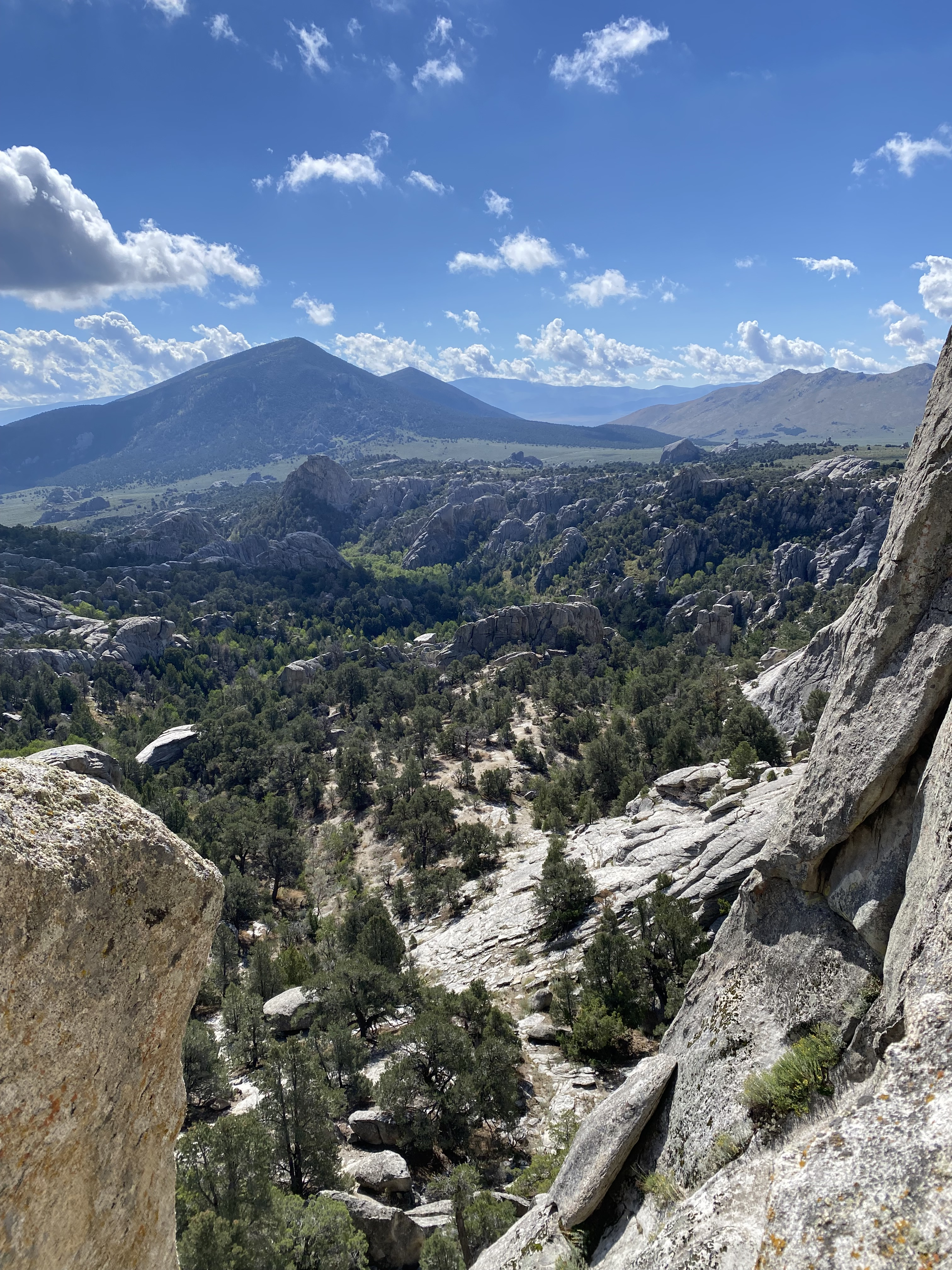
City of Rocks State Park near Almo, Idaho is a popular destination for hikers and rock climbers.

The monument standing in Almo is dedicated to the memory of the nearly 300 pioneers that did not escape the alleged massacre. The monument was erected on October 17, 1938. The monument is a granite stone carved in the shape of the state of Idaho with an inscription that reads "Almo, Idaho, dedicated to the memory of those who lost their lives in a most horrible Indian massacre, 1861. Three hundred immigrants west bound, only five escaped. Erected by S. & D. of Idaho Pioneers 1938." Some of the longtime residents of Almo, including the Sons and Daughters of the Idaho Pioneers, view the monument as essential to the history of the town.

=== Controversy ===
Although the exact reasons for its creation are unknown, some believe the monument was made in an effort to make Almo a recognizable place on the map and increase the likelihood that tourists would stop in town on their way to City of Rocks National Reserve. City of Rocks, sometimes referred to as Silent City of Rocks, is a popular destination for hikers and rock climbers and is situated close to Almo and the nearby town of Oakley.

Citizens of Almo are at a crossroads when it comes to the monument. Defenders of the monument claim it strengthens the economy of the little unincorporated town as a popular tourist sight. Additionally, some residents of Almo maintain that it is a part of their history. One resident claims that its a part of the villages' identity, as many residents of modern-day Almo are fourth or fifth generation residents. A retired school teacher from Almo recalls it being taught as a part of the schools curriculum. Some have a more understanding point of view, describing the monument as someone being "over-eager." The President of the Sons and Daughters of Idaho Pioneers has openly apologized to the Shoshone tribe; however, before her death, the monument was not removed or replaced.

== Legacy ==
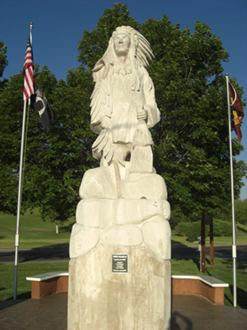
Monument to Chief Pocatello of the Shoshone tribe in Pocatello, Idaho

Given the lack of evidence, modern day members of the Shoshone tribe view the monument, which tells the story of the massacre as long as it stands, in a more negative and offensive light. Keith Tinno of the Shoshone-Bannock tribe demanded an apology from the Sons and Daughters of the Idaho Pioneers confronting the reality that the tribe was falsely accused of an event that did not definitively happen. One suggestion is to replace the monument commemorating the massacre, considered an embarrassment by some, with one that is in memory of Chief Pocatello of the Shoshone tribe. This monument or something similar would be more historically accurate and provide the city of Almo a better image than one dedicated to the mythological massacre.

== Violence from Native Americans on settlers ==
Actual massacres occurred where Native Americans were the aggressors. Native American aggression is attributed to the creation of the Almo, Idaho Massacre myth.

- Ward Massacre
- Fort Pueblo massacre
- Gold Beach Massacre
- Spirit Lake massacre
- Mountain Meadows massacre
- Otter massacre
- Bascom affair
- Battle of Cookes Canyon

== See also ==
- Historical revisionism
- Denial of atrocities against Indigenous peoples
