= Standrod, Utah =

Unincorporated community in Box Elder County, Utah, United States

- Unincorporated community
- Location within the state of Utah Location within the United States
- Coordinates: 41°59′38″N 113°25′09″W
- Country: United States
- State: Utah
- County: Box Elder
- Settled: 1892
- Elevation: 5,768 ft (1,758 m)
- Time zone: UTC-7 (Mountain (MST))
  - Summer (DST): UTC-6 (MDT)
- ZIP code: 84329
- Area code: 435
- GNIS feature ID: 1437693

Standrod is an unincorporated community in extreme northwestern Box Elder County, Utah, United States, very close to the Idaho state line.

== Description ==
Standrod is a rural community that is reached primarily by dirt roads. The residents of Standrod primarily rely on agriculture. The community is in the area of the Raft River Mountains. The climate of the area has four distinct seasons that occur in the northern Great Basin area.

== History ==
Historical population
Census	Pop.	Note	%±
1920	36		—
1930	19		−47.2%
1940	21		10.5%
Source: U.S. Census Bureau

Standrod was first settled in 1892. In 1898 a school house was built, placed deliberately on the state line so it was half in Idaho and half in Utah. The town was named for a judge in Idaho.
