= Jim Sage Mountains =

Mountain range in Cassia County, Idaho, United States

- Location within Idaho

Highest point
- Peak: Elba Peak
- Elevation: 2,449 m (8,035 ft)

Geography
- Country: United States
- State: Idaho
- District: Cassia County
- Range coordinates: 42°11′00″N 113°28′00″W
- Topo map: USGS Pocatello

The Jim Sage Mountains are a small mountain range in Cassia County, Idaho, United States, that are subrange of the Albion Mountains.

== Description ==
The range is bounded by the Raft River Valley on the east, the Raft River on the south, the Albion Mountains on the west, and Cassia Creek on the north. The highest point in the range is Elba Peak, at 8,046 feet (2,452 m).

The range was originally considered to be the southern part of what was called the Malta Range, with the Cotterel Mountains being the northern part. However, it was later determined that they were two separate ranges, and the new names were applied accordingly.

== See also ==
- List of mountain ranges in Idaho
