= Lynn, Utah =

Unincorporated community in the state of Utah, United States

- Unincorporated community
- Location within Utah Location within the United States
- Coordinates: 41°52′22″N 113°44′41″W
- Country: United States
- State: Utah
- County: Box Elder
- Elevation: 5,945 ft (1,812 m)
- Time zone: UTC-7 (Mountain (MST))
  - Summer (DST): UTC-6 (MDT)
- Area code: 435
- GNIS feature ID: 1443051

Lynn is an unincorporated community in Box Elder County, Utah, United States. It is located in the northwestern corner of the state, close to Utah's border with Idaho. Lynn lies in a valley between the Goose Creek Mountains to its west, and a portion of the Clear Creek Mountains and Sawtooth National Forest to its east. The south fork of Junction Creek passes through the town. No paved roads provide access to Lynn, though Utah State Route 30 passes close to the community.

Lynn's name is an alteration of the last name of one of its founders, John Lind, a Swedish immigrant who settled there in 1882.

In 1920, there was a Mormon church, grade school (the "Junction School"), and mail service in the Lynn area, all later abandoned. As of 1999, only two families lived all year round in Lynn, with some ranchers coming in the summers to attend to crops of hay and grain.
