= Bull Mountain (Box Elder County, Utah) =

Mountain in Box Elder County, Utah, United States

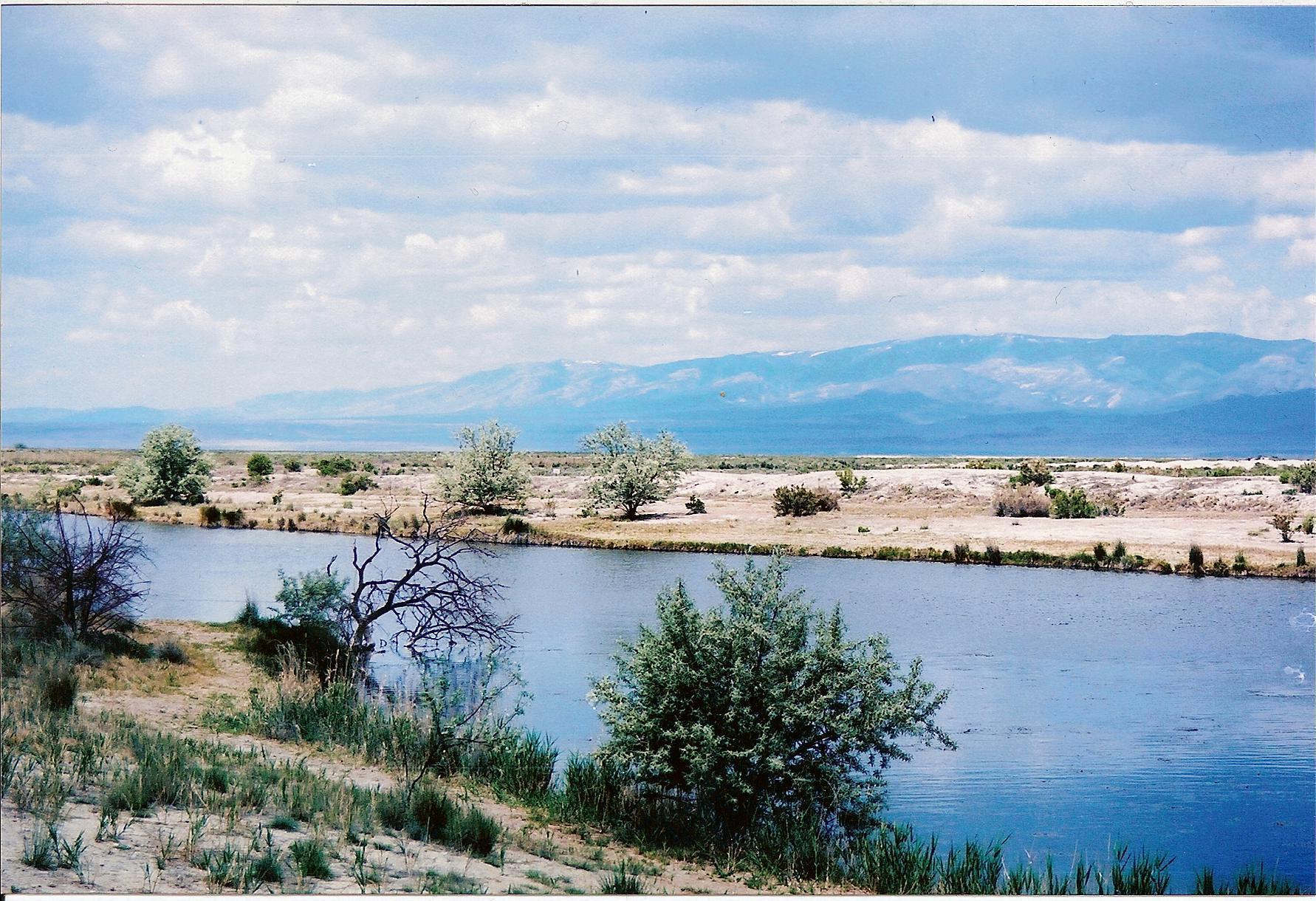
- Bull Mountain and the Raft River Range

Highest point
- Elevation: 9,938 ft (3,029 m) NAVD 88{
- Prominence: 3,725 ft (1,135 m)
- Listing: Utah county high points #25
- Coordinates: 41°54′36″N 113°21′57″W

Geography
- Location within Utah
- Location: Box Elder County, Utah, U.S.
- Parent range: Raft River Mountains
- Topo map: USGS Standrod

Climbing
- Easiest route: 4-wheel drive road

Bull Mountain, an officially unnamed summit in northern Utah, United States, has an elevation of 9,938 feet (3,029 m). It is the highest point in the Raft River Mountains and Box Elder County.

== Description ==
The mountain is located southeast of Yost, west of Snowville and south of Malta, Idaho in the Raft River Division of the Minidoka Ranger District of Sawtooth National Forest.

The northern slopes of Bull Mountain are drained by tributaries of the Raft River, a tributary of the Snake River, and the southern slopes drain into the Great Salt Lake. The peak can be reached via a long trail from the east or a 4-wheel drive road from the west. The summit is very broad, but views from the mountain can encompass the Albion, Black Pine, and Wasatch mountains.

== Climate ==
Climate data for Bull Mountain 41.9102 N, 113.3654 W, Elevation: 9,892 ft (3,015 m) (1991–2020 normals)
Month	Jan	Feb	Mar	Apr	May	Jun	Jul	Aug	Sep	Oct	Nov	Dec	Year
Mean daily maximum °F (°C)	26.6 (−3.0)	27.3 (−2.6)	32.4 (0.2)	37.2 (2.9)	46.7 (8.2)	57.9 (14.4)	68.6 (20.3)	67.7 (19.8)	58.0 (14.4)	44.1 (6.7)	32.6 (0.3)	25.8 (−3.4)	43.7 (6.5)
Daily mean °F (°C)	18.9 (−7.3)	18.7 (−7.4)	23.2 (−4.9)	27.5 (−2.5)	36.6 (2.6)	46.7 (8.2)	56.7 (13.7)	56.5 (13.6)	47.5 (8.6)	35.3 (1.8)	24.8 (−4.0)	18.4 (−7.6)	34.2 (1.2)
Mean daily minimum °F (°C)	11.1 (−11.6)	10.1 (−12.2)	14.0 (−10.0)	17.9 (−7.8)	26.6 (−3.0)	35.5 (1.9)	44.7 (7.1)	45.3 (7.4)	37.0 (2.8)	26.6 (−3.0)	17.0 (−8.3)	10.9 (−11.7)	24.7 (−4.0)
Average precipitation inches (mm)	5.57 (141)	4.50 (114)	4.67 (119)	5.32 (135)	5.41 (137)	2.68 (68)	1.68 (43)	1.53 (39)	2.32 (59)	3.58 (91)	3.36 (85)	6.74 (171)	47.36 (1,202)
Source: PRISM Climate Group

== See also ==
- List of mountains in Utah
