= Yost, Utah =

- Unincorporated community
- Location within the state of Utah Yost (the United States)
- Coordinates: 41°57′39″N 113°32′32″W
- Country: United States
- State: Utah
- County: Box Elder
- Settled: 1879
- Incorporated: August 19, 1935
- Disincorporated: January 6, 1984
- Named for: Charles Yost
- Elevation: 5,975 ft (1,821 m)
- Time zone: UTC-7 (Mountain (MST))
  - Summer (DST): UTC-6 (MDT)
- GNIS feature ID: 1434515

Yost is an unincorporated community located in northwestern Box Elder County, Utah, United States, on the north central slopes of the Raft River Mountains, some 100 miles (160 km) northwest of Brigham City.

== Description ==
Historical population
| Census | Pop. | Note | %± |
|---|---|---|---|
| 1940 | 172 | | — |
| 1950 | 107 | | −37.8% |
| 1960 | 87 | | −18.7% |
| 1970 | 51 | | −41.4% |
| 1980 | 67 | | 31.4% |

The first name for the area was "George Creek" for a man named George Eddy Sanderson, an early range rider who came to the area with Charles Yost from the Nevada Territory. Charles Yost remained in the area, becoming postmaster in 1887. After Yost built his cabin, he lived alone until he married Maria Larsen from Terrace, Utah, on the south side of the mountains. For four years she was the only woman living in Yost.

Yost was later settled by other pioneer homesteaders. By 1910 the population had increased to 251 people. The town had a schoolhouse and church built. Yost incorporated on August 19, 1935, during the Great Depression. At the time, Yost's boundaries were the largest in area in the state of Utah. However, due to poor land quality for farming and ranching, the population declined and the town of Yost disincorporated on January 6, 1984.
