= Crystal Spring (Box Elder County, Utah) =

Stream in Box Elder County, Utah, U.S.

Coordinates: 41.9178751°N 113.1966142°W

Crystal Spring is a stream in Box Elder County, Utah, United States.

The spring was so named on account of crystalline rock outcroppings.

== See also ==
- List of rivers of Utah
