= Sublett Range =

Mountain range in Idaho and Utah in the United States

- Location within Idaho

Highest point
- Peak: Sublett Range High Point
- Elevation: 7,492 ft (2,284 m)
- Coordinates: 42°22′12″N 112°55′50″W

Dimensions
- Length: 55 mi (89 km) N/S
- Width: 33 mi (53 km) E/W
- Area: 886 mi^{2} (2,290 km^{2})

Geography
- Country: United States
- State(s): Idaho, Utah

The Sublett Range is a mountain range in Idaho (~94%) and Utah (~6%) in the United States, spanning Cassia, Oneida, and Power counties, Idaho and reaching into Box Elder County, Utah. The Phosphoria Formation reaches its greatest thickness beneath the mountains.

== Description ==
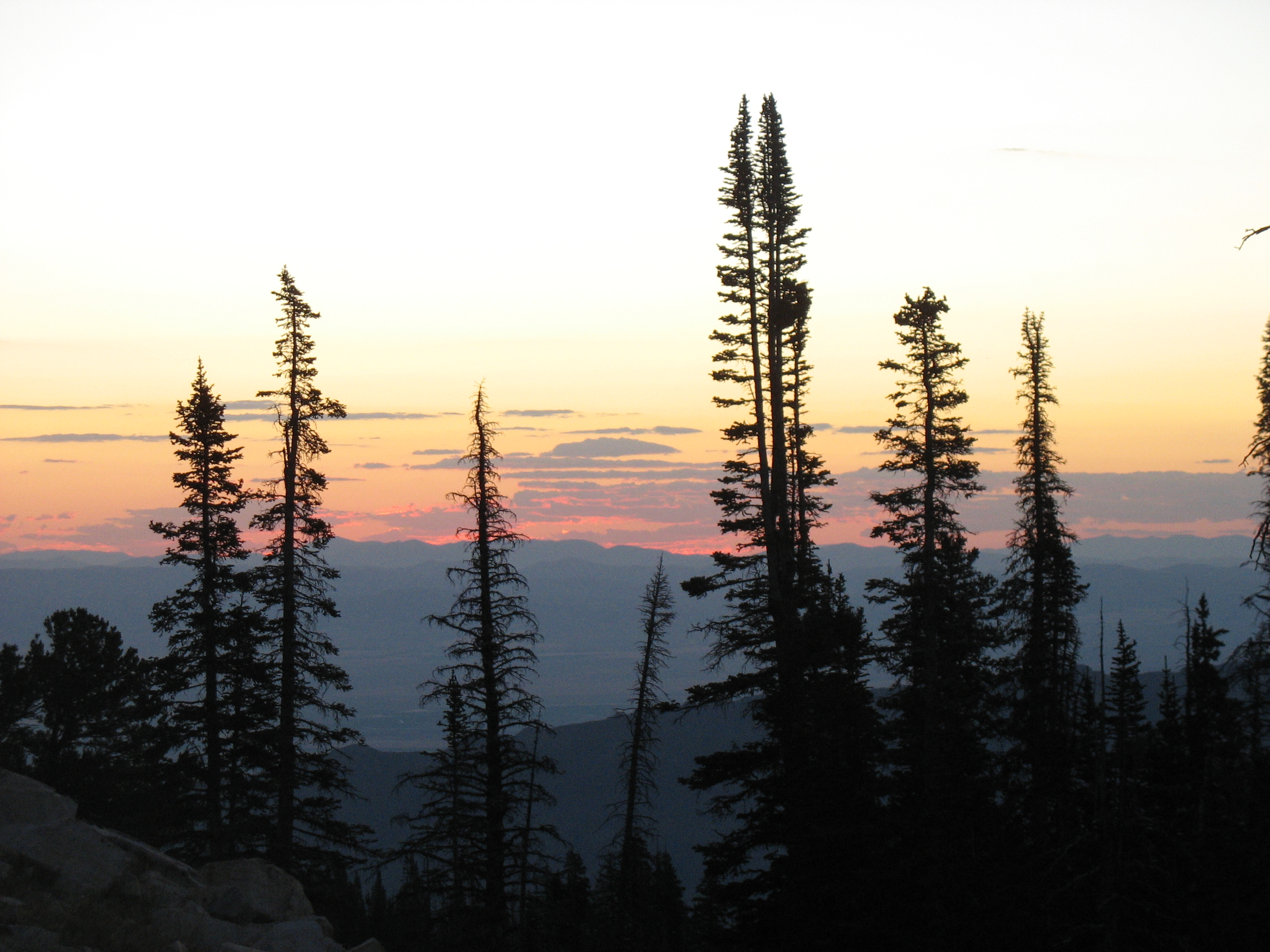
Sunrise on the Albion Mountains, with the Sublett Range in the distance, August, 2010

The highest point in the range is known as the Sublett Range High Point at 7,492 feet (2,284 m), and the range is a part of the Basin and Range Province. The northern part of the mountains are part of the Sublett Division of the Minidoka Ranger District of Sawtooth National Forest. The range was named after the trapper William Sublette, who lived in the area in the 1830s.

The Raft River and Black Pine mountains are southwest of the range, while the Albion Mountains are to the west. The northern part of the mountains are in the Snake River watershed, which is a tributary of the Columbia River, while the southern section drains to the Great Salt Lake. The town of Snowville, Utah is south of the mountains, Malta, Idaho is to the west, and American Falls, Idaho is to the north. Interstate 84 passes just to the south and west of the mountains. Most of the mountains are covered in sagebrush steppe and meadows, but there can be pockets of Douglas fir on northern slopes.

== See also ==
- List of mountain ranges of Idaho
- List of mountain ranges of Utah
