= Connor, Idaho =

Unincorporated community in Casia County, Idaho, United States

- Unincorporated community
- Location in Idaho Location in the United States
- Coordinates: 42°16′52″N 113°30′5″W
- Country: United States
- State: Idaho
- County: Cassia
- Elevation: 4,931 ft (1,503 m)
- Time zone: UTC-7 (Mountain (MST))
  - Summer (DST): UTC-6 (MDT)
- ZIP Code: 83342
- Area codes: 208, 986
- GNIS feature ID: 379624

Connor is an unincorporated community in Cassia County, Idaho, United States, along Idaho State Highway 77, about 7.5 miles (12.1 km) west of Malta.

== Name ==
Connor is named after Colonel Patrick Edward Connor, a nineteenth-century military leader known for his campaigns against Indians in the American Old West. Connor, who was stationed at Camp Douglas, Utah, ordered Captain Samuel P. Smith to attack Indians in Idaho. Smith, acting under Connor's order, nearly annihilated a group of Indians in 1864 at the place now called Connor Creek. This massacre was considered retaliation for an alleged battle three years prior in nearby Almo Creek, where Indians killed almost 300 emigrants who were moving through the area. However, James Loewen points out in "Lies Across America" that decades of research has led to no indication that any emigrants were killed in the Almo area.

== Education ==
Connor is a part of the Cassia County School District.

Zoned schools include:

- Raft River Elementary School
- Raft River Junior/Senior High School
