= Elba, Idaho =

Unincorporated community in Cassia County, Idaho, United States

- Unincorporated community
- Location in Idaho Location in the United States
- Country: United States
- State: Idaho
- County: Cassia
- Elevation: 5,131 ft (1,564 m)
- Time zone: UTC-7 (Mountain (MST))
  - Summer (DST): UTC-6 (MDT)
- ZIP Code: 83342
- Area codes: 208, 986
- GNIS feature ID: 397683

Elba is an unincorporated community in Cassia County, Idaho, United States, that is located along Idaho State Highway 77 Spur.

== History ==
Elba was originally called Beecherville, and under the latter name the first permanent settlement was made in 1873. A post office named Elba was established in 1883, and remained in operation until 1996. The present name is a transfer from the island of Elba, in Italy.

Elba's population was 212 in 1909, and was 70 in 1960.
