= Bull Mountain (Garfield County, Utah) =

Mountain in the American state of Utah

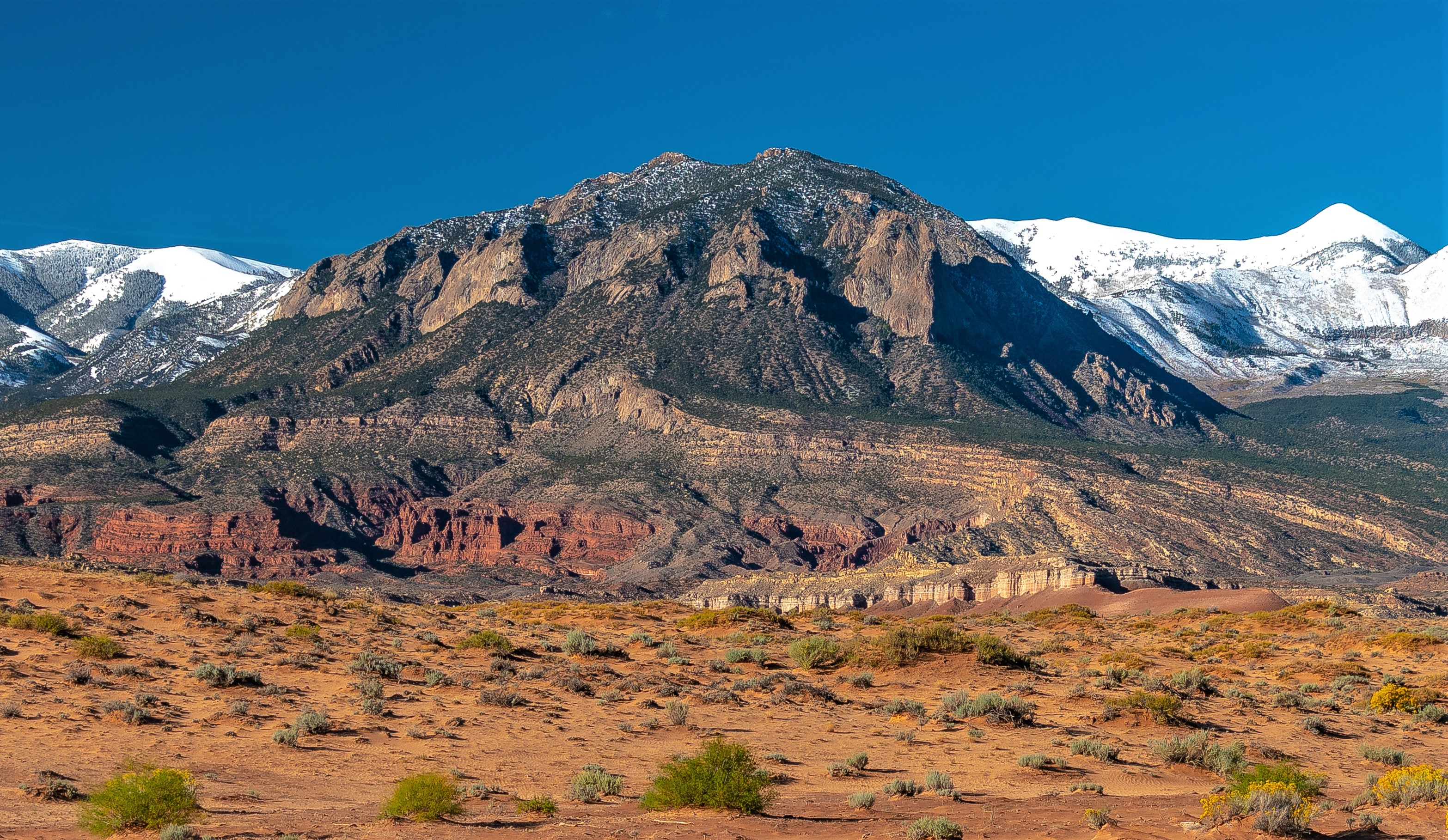
- Northeast aspect, from Highway 95 (Snow-capped Mt. Ellen in back)

Highest point
- Elevation: 9,187 ft (2,800 m)
- Prominence: 1,347 ft (411 m)
- Isolation: 2.83 mi (4.55 km)
- Coordinates: 38°08′25″N 110°43′56″W

Geography
- Location within Utah Location within the United States
- Country: United States
- State: Utah
- County: Garfield
- Parent range: Henry Mountains
- Topo map: USGS Bull Mountain

Geology
- Rock type: Igneous

Climbing
- Easiest route: class 2 scrambling

Bull Mountain is a 9,187-foot (2,800 m) elevation summit located in northern Garfield County of Utah, United States. Bull Mountain is part of the Henry Mountains which are set between Capitol Reef National Park to the west, and Glen Canyon National Recreation Area to the east. Mount Ellen is immediately southwest of Bull Mountain, and Burr Desert spreads out to the northeast. It is situated in a dry, rugged, and sparsely settled region, set on primitive land administered by the Bureau of Land Management. Precipitation runoff from this mountain drains into tributaries of the Colorado River. The nearest town is Hanksville, 17 miles to the north, and Robbers Roost is 20 miles to the northeast.

== Climate ==
Spring and fall are the most favorable seasons to visit Bull Mountain. According to the Köppen climate classification system, it is located in a Cold semi-arid climate zone, which is defined by the coldest month having an average mean temperature below 32 °F (0 °C), and at least 50% of the total annual precipitation being received during the spring and summer. This desert climate receives less than 10 inches (250 millimeters) of annual rainfall, and snowfall is generally light during the winter.

== Gallery ==
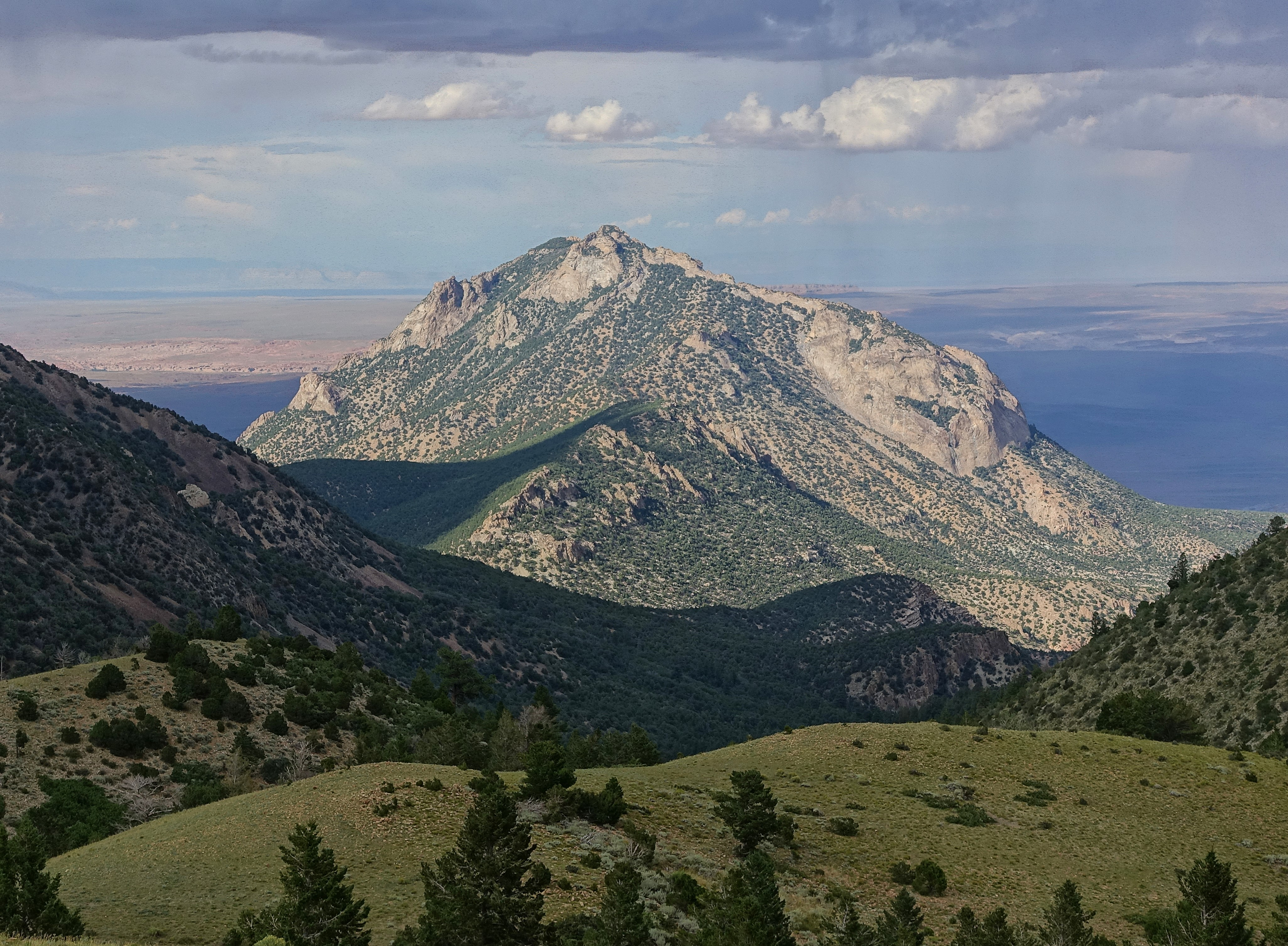
South aspect

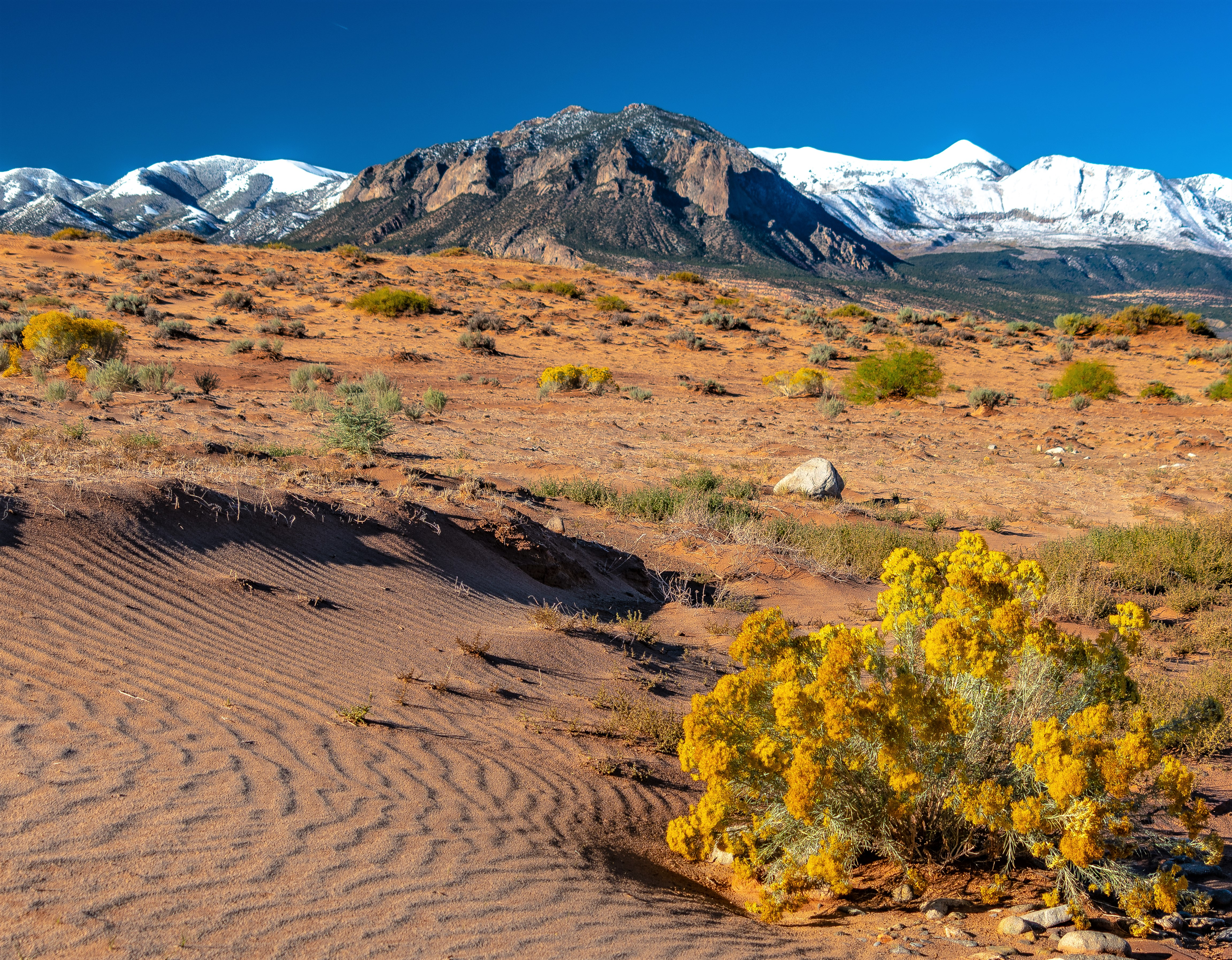
Northeast aspect

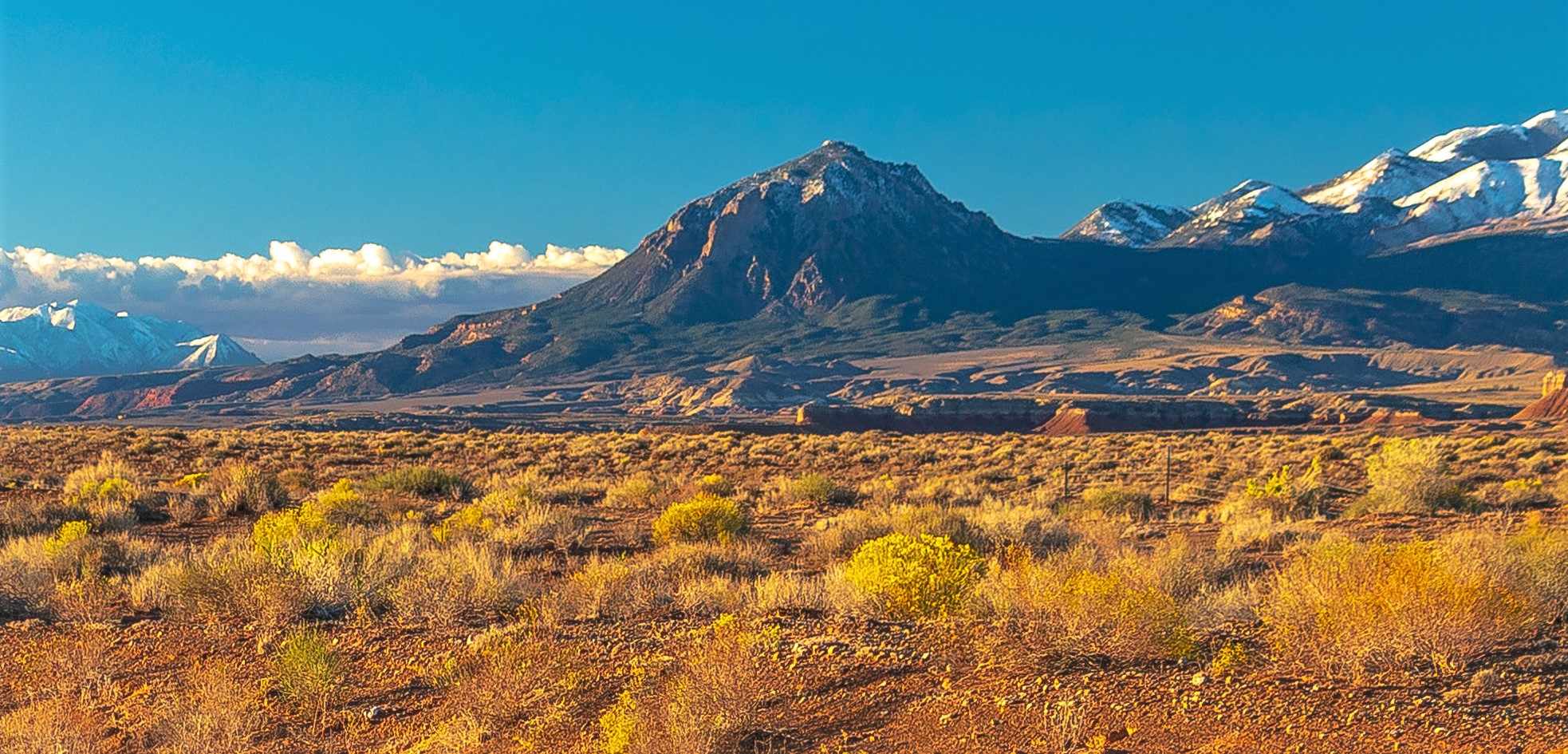
From the north

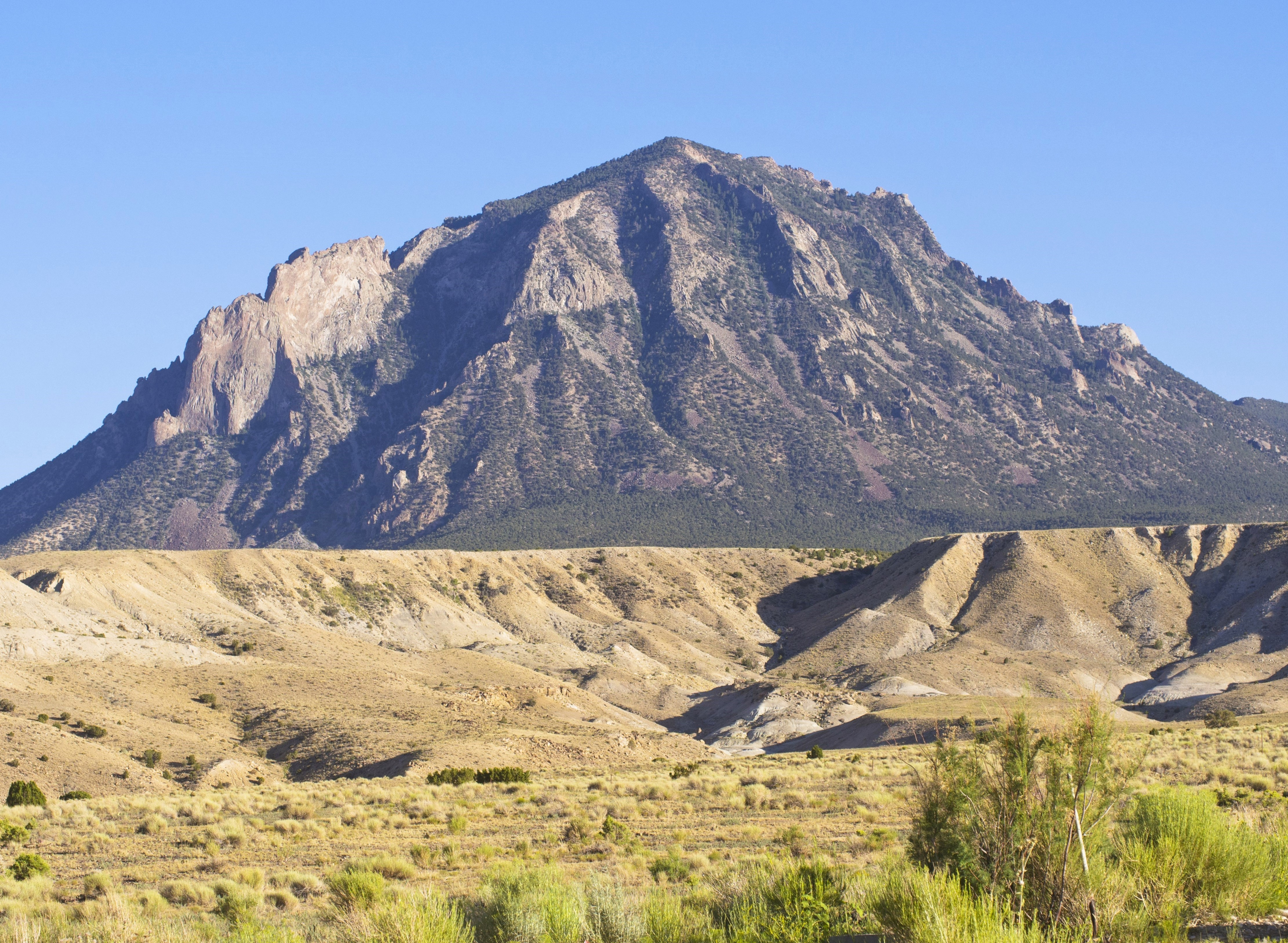
North aspect

== See also ==
- Colorado Plateau
- List of mountain peaks of Utah
