= Cotterel Mountains =

Mountain range in Cassia County, Idaho, United States

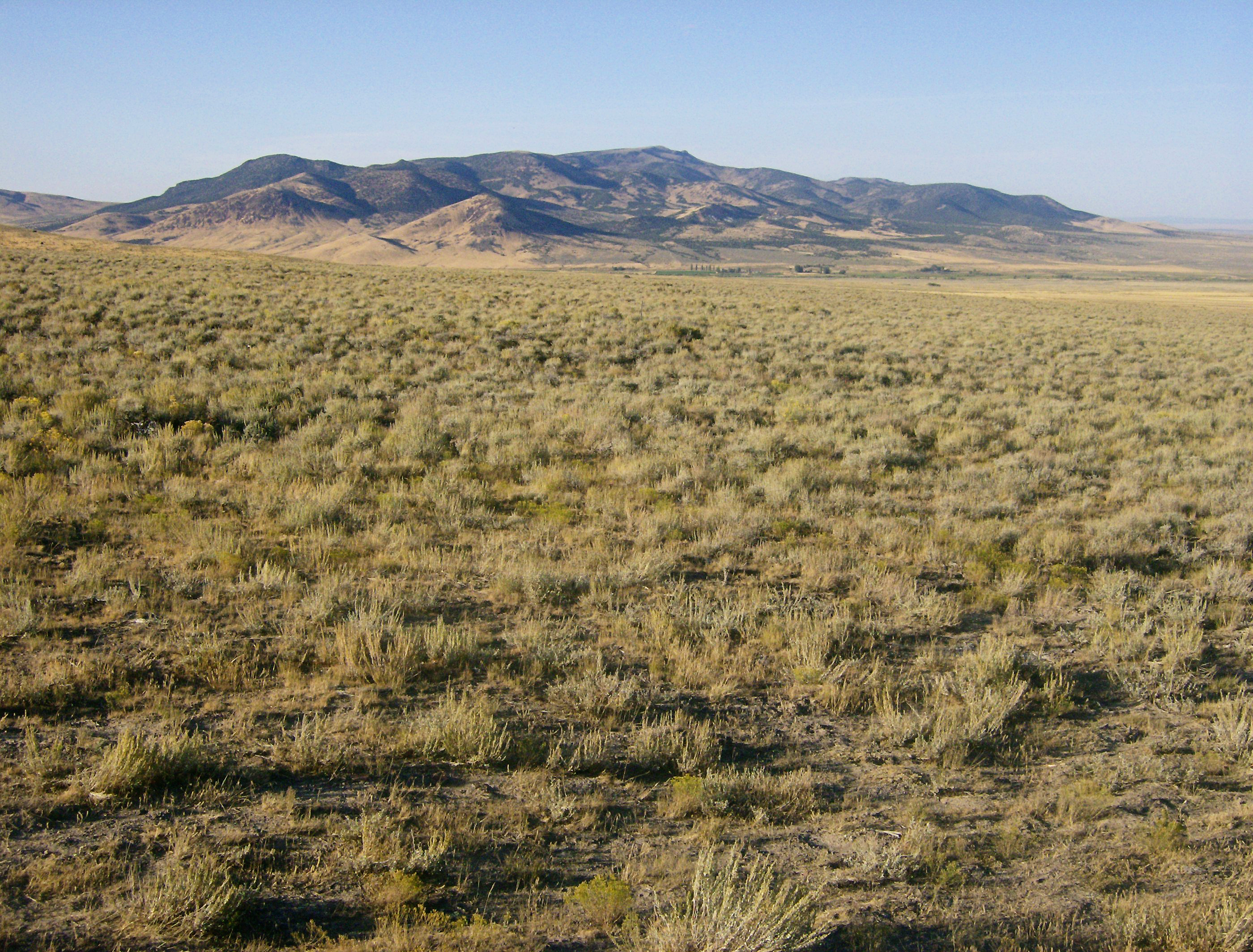
- View across the Raft River Valley at the Cotterel Range, July 2011

Highest point
- Peak: Peak 7140
- Elevation: 2,159 m (7,083 ft)

Geography
- Location within Idaho
- Country: United States
- State: Idaho
- District: Cassia County
- Range coordinates: 42°29′00″N 113°27′00″W
- Topo map: USGS Pocatello

The Cotterel Mountains are a small mountain range in Cassia County, Idaho, United States, that are subrange of the Albion Mountains.

== Description ==
The ranges is bounded by the Raft River Valley on the east and northeast, Cassia Creek on the south, the Albion Mountains on the west, and the East Hills on the northwest. The highest point in the range is Peak 7140, at 7,140 feet (2,180 m).

The range was originally considered to be the northern part of what was called the Malta Range, with the Jim Mountains being the northern part. However, it was later determined that they were two separate ranges, and the new names were applied accordingly.

== See also ==
- List of mountain ranges in Idaho
