= Almo, Idaho =

Unincorporated town in Cassia County, Idaho, United States

- Unincorporated town
- Location in Idaho Location in the United States
- Coordinates: ource:gnis 42°6′1″N 113°38′1″W
- Country: United States
- State: Idaho
- County: Cassia
- Elevation: 5,397 ft (1,645 m)
- Time zone: UTC-7 (Mountain (MST))
  - Summer (DST): UTC-6 (MDT)
- ZIP Code: 83312
- Area codes: 208, 986
- GNIS feature ID: 376562

Almo is an unincorporated town in the Upper Raft River Valley in Cassia County, Idaho, United States.

== Description ==
Almo is just over 2 miles (3.2 km) east away from the City of Rocks National Reserve, a 14,300-acre (58 km^{2}) area with granite columns as much as 600 feet (180 m) high. The ZIP Code for Almo is 83312.

Almo is part of the Burley, Idaho Micropolitan Statistical Area.

== History ==
Many pioneers followed the Oregon Trail west in the middle of the 19th century, and passed by the future site of Almo. Several of these pioneers wrote letters home describing their encounters with Native Americans. Although these accounts tended to be exaggerated by participants, there is historical evidence of several small incidents that took place from 1860 to 1862.

However, Almo's most famous historical event, the Almo Massacre of 1861, did not occur. In 1938, the Sons and Daughters of Idaho Pioneers paid for and erected a marker in remembrance of the massacre, in which a wagon train of nearly 300 pioneers was supposedly surrounded and slaughtered by Native Americans. However, the earliest written record of this event is from 1927, and the total absence of information about either the slaughtered pioneers or the five survivors has led the Idaho State Historical Society to recommend the removal of the marker, which the town has refused to do.

Almo was established around a post office in 1881. It had previously been part of a ranch belonging to Myron B. Durfee and had often been considered to be in Utah. By 1890, 40 of the 55 families in the Almo vicinity belonged to the LDS Church, and most claimed English or Scandinavian ancestry. Almo at the turn of the century boasted a store, a post office, a school, a brass band, a theatrical group, three saloons, and a welfare society. Almo's population reached 260 by 1920, the peak of Almo's population growth. Its population declined in the years to follow, as less land was available to homestead. Almo's population was 100 in 1960.
