= Black Pine Mountains =

Mountain range in Idaho and Utah

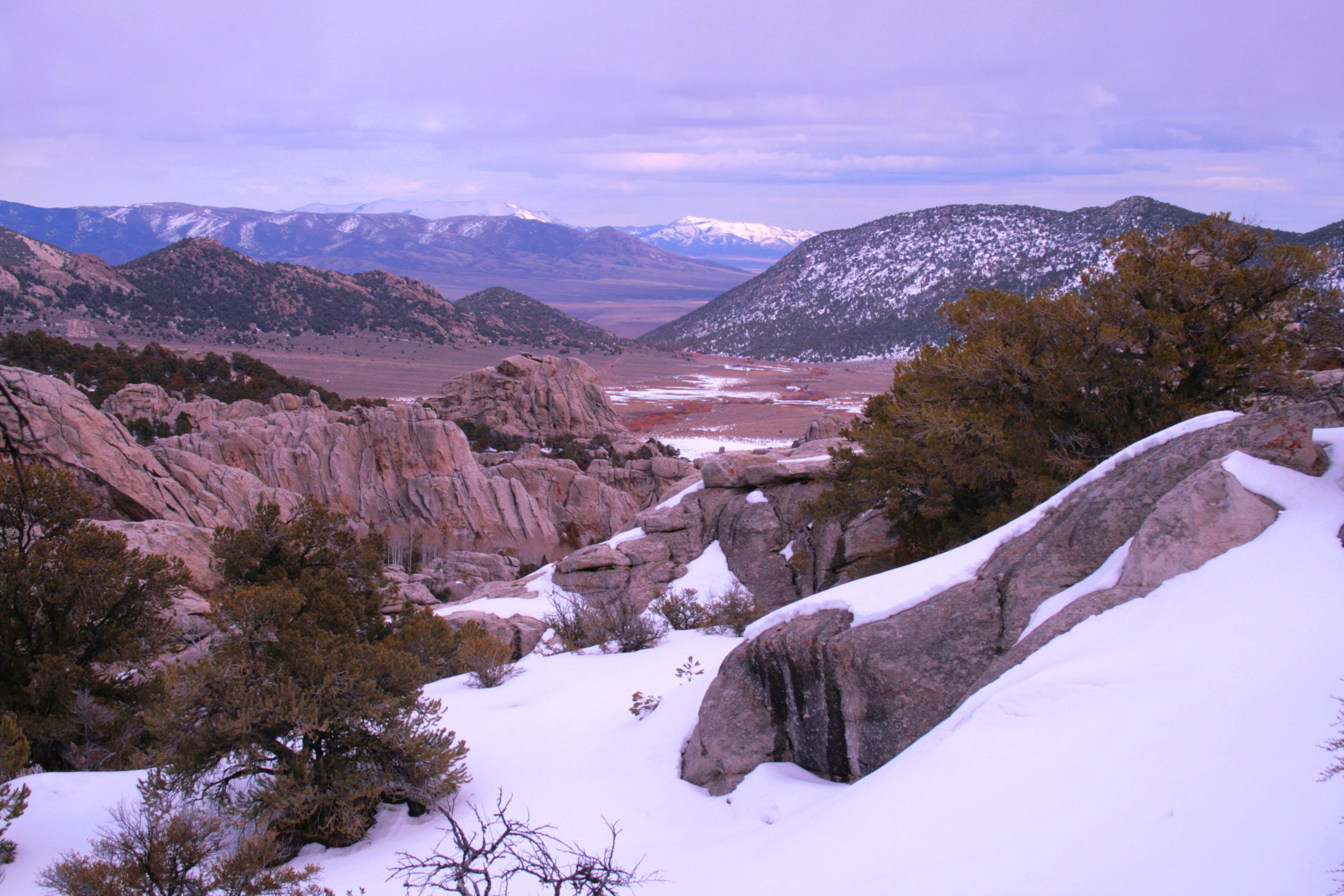
- The snowcapped Black Pine Mountains in far background viewed from the City of Rocks National Reserve

Highest point
- Peak: Black Pine Mountains High Point
- Elevation: 9,389 ft (2,862 m)
- Coordinates: 42°08′19″N 113°07′32″W

Dimensions
- Length: 53 mi (85 km) N/S
- Width: 24 mi (39 km) E/W
- Area: 577 mi^{2} (1,490 km^{2})

Geography
- Country: United States
- State: Idaho

The Black Pine Mountains are a mountain range in the U.S. states of Idaho (~65%) and Utah (~35%), spanning Cassia County, Idaho and reaching into Box Elder County, Utah. The highest point in the range is known as Black Pine Mountains High Point, sometimes referred to as Black Peak, at 9,395 feet (2,864 m), and the range is a part of the Great Basin Divide and the Basin and Range Province. In Idaho, the mountains are part of the Black Pine Division of the Minidoka Ranger District of Sawtooth National Forest.

The Raft River Mountains are southwest of the range, while the Albion Mountains are to the west, and the Sublett Mountains are to the northeast. The northern slopes of the mountains are in the Snake River watershed, which is a tributary of the Columbia River, while the southern slopes drain to the Great Salt Lake. The town of Snowville, Utah is southeast of the mountains, and Malta, Idaho is to the northwest. Interstate 84 passes just to the east of the mountains.

== Peaks ==
The peaks of the Black Pine Mountains
Mountain Peak	Elevation	Prominence	Isolation	Location
Black Pine Mountains High Point	9,389 ft 2862 m	4,069 ft 1240 m	21.1 mi 33.9 km	42.13866°N 113.125608°W
Black Pine Peak	9,386 ft 2861 m	186 ft 57 m	1.3 mi 2.09 km	42.120274°N 113.12037°W
Peak 8,376	8,376 ft 2553 m	396 ft 121 m	1.7 mi 2.74 km	42.1139°N 113.0885°W
Gunnell Benchmark	8,300 ft 2530 m	1,160 ft 354 m	2.93 mi 4.72 km	42.0782°N 113.1272°W
Black Pine Cone	8,020 ft 2445 m	800 ft 244 m	2.66 mi 4.28 km	42.0819°N 113.0597°W
Peak 7,734	7,734 ft 2357 m	564 ft 172 m	4.75 mi 7.64 km	42.1867°N 113.1440°W
Peak 7,620	7,620 ft 2323 m	400 ft 122 m	1.29 mi 2.07 km	42.0970°N 113.0744°W
Peak 7,144	7,144 ft 2177 m	404 ft 123 m	2.68 mi 4.31 km	42.1523°N 113.0812°W
