= Raft River Mountains =

Mountain range in Utah, United States

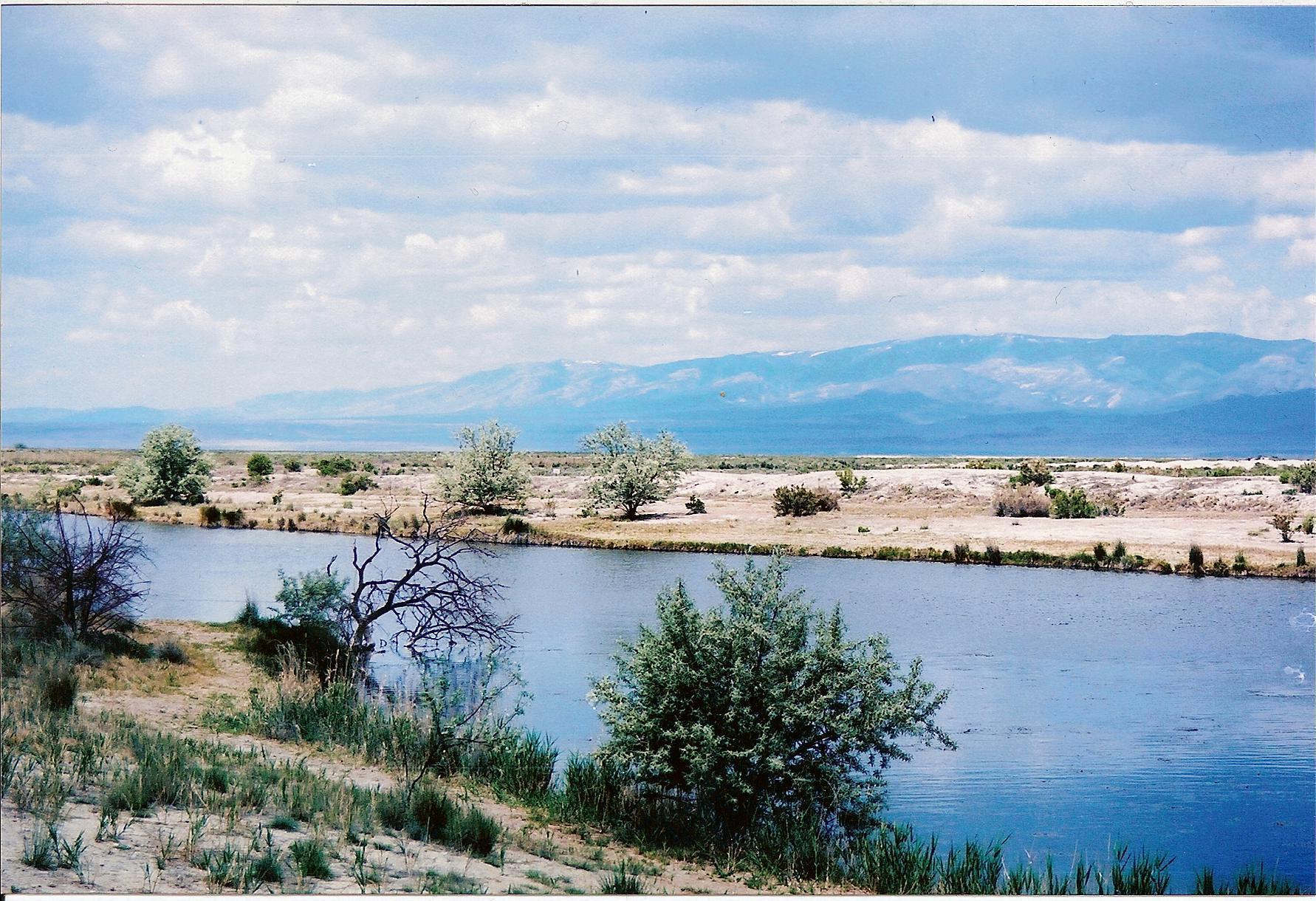
- Raft River Mountains from the southeast

Highest point
- Peak: Bull Mountain
- Elevation: 9,925 ft (3,025 m)
- Coordinates: 41°54′42″N 113°21′55″W

Dimensions
- Length: 40 mi (64 km) E/W
- Width: 35 mi (56 km) N/S
- Area: 765 mi^{2} (1,980 km^{2})

Geography
- Country: United States
- State: Utah
- Parent range: Basin and Range Province

The Raft River Mountains are a mountain range in northern Box Elder County, Utah, United States. The mountains are located in the Raft River Division of the Minidoka Ranger District of the Sawtooth National Forest. The highest point is Bull Mountain, near the Dunn Benchmark, at 9,925 ft (3,025 m), and the ghost town of Yost is on the north-central slopes. Tributaries of the Raft River drain the northern slopes of the range to the Snake River then Columbia River and Pacific Ocean, while the southern slopes drain to the Great Salt Lake.

== Geography ==
Located in the Sawtooth National Forest, the range's montane forest ecoregion is "surrounded by montane steppes and desert". The range is oriented in an east–west orientation, and is a portion of the Great Basin Divide and the Basin and Range Province between the Bonneville Basin of the Great Basin (south).

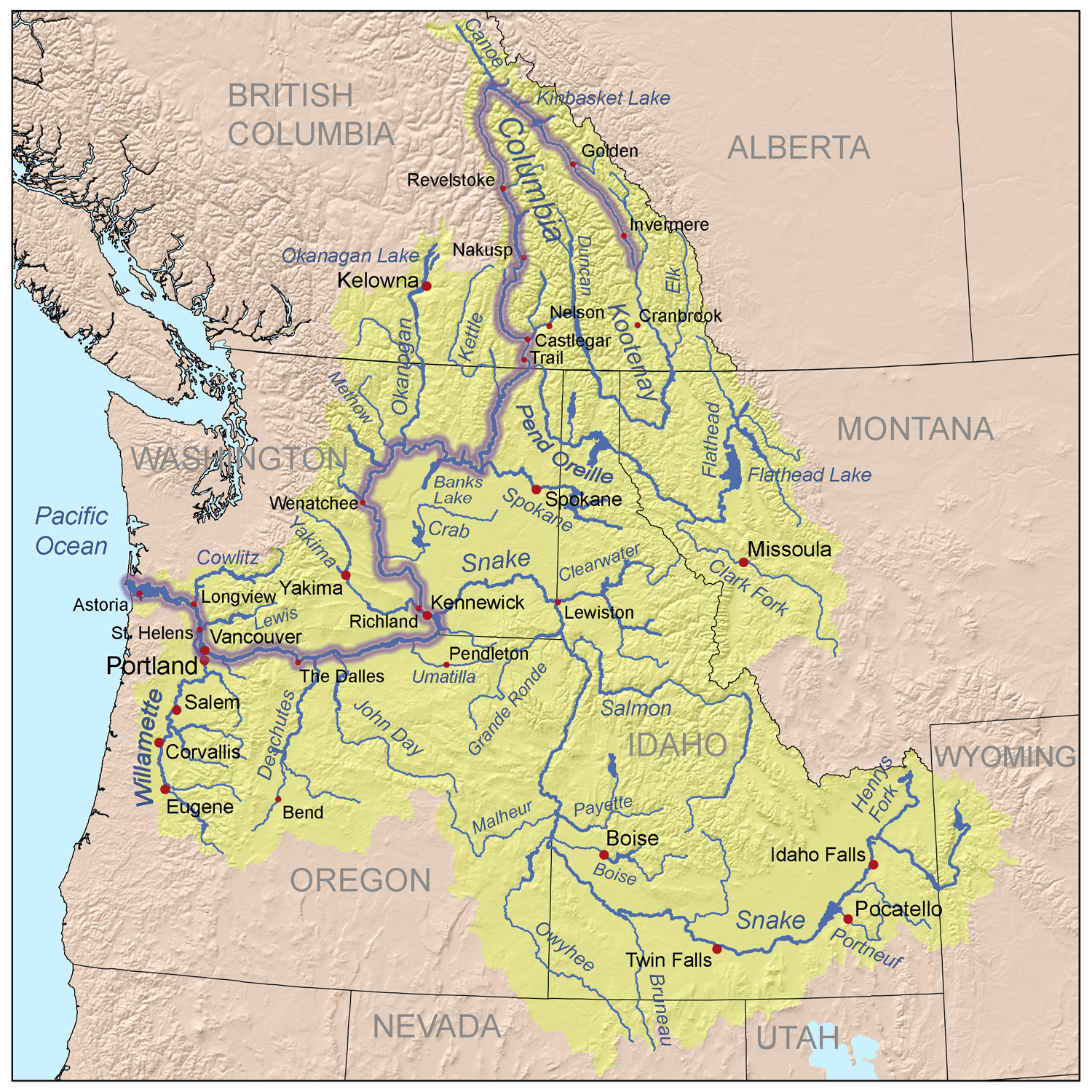
The Raft River Mountains are the southeast edge of the Columbia Basin (green) in the small northwest Utah portion of the Great Basin Divide. The Great Basin side (tan) of the range is in the Northern Great Salt Lake Desert Watershed (formerly of the Pleistocene Lake Bonneville).

== Geology ==
The central mass of the range consists of Precambrian metamorphic rocks. The Elba Quartzite with interlayered schist outcrops along the southern slopes of the range and in the Grouse Creek Mountains to the southwest. Cambrian quartzite outcrops in the west part of the range and in the Grouse Creek range and the Goose Creek Mountains to the west. The thinly bedded quartzites have been quarried for building stone in the area.

== Flora and fauna ==
The range's plants and animals include pines and rodents of the Northern Basin & Range ecoregion of the Columbia Plateau.

== Camping and activities ==
The range's Bull Flat trail leads to Bull Flat, Bull Lake, and Bull Mountain, and passes former mines (the trailhead is near a campground).

== Peaks ==
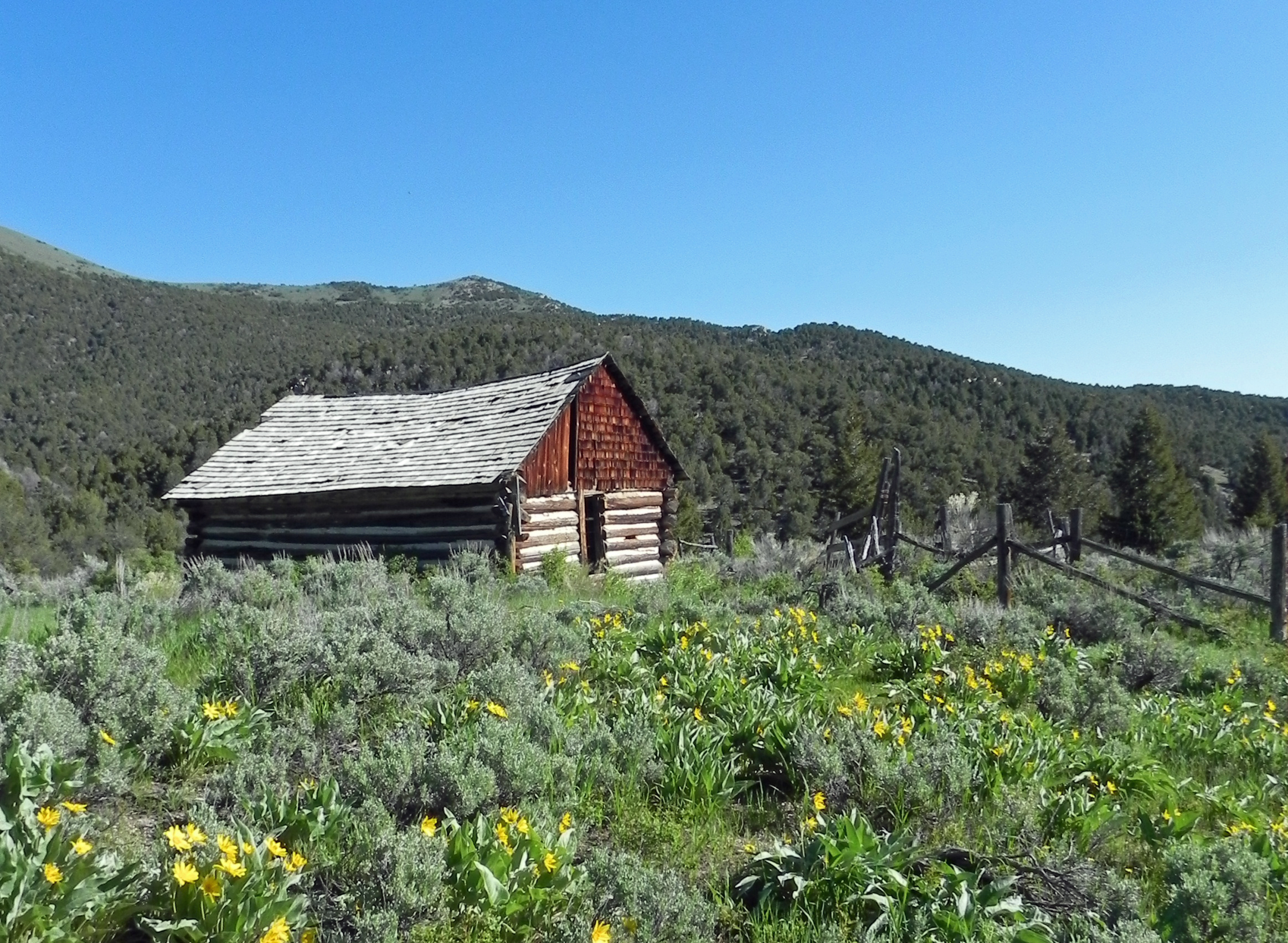
An old Forest Service Cabin in the Raft River Mountains

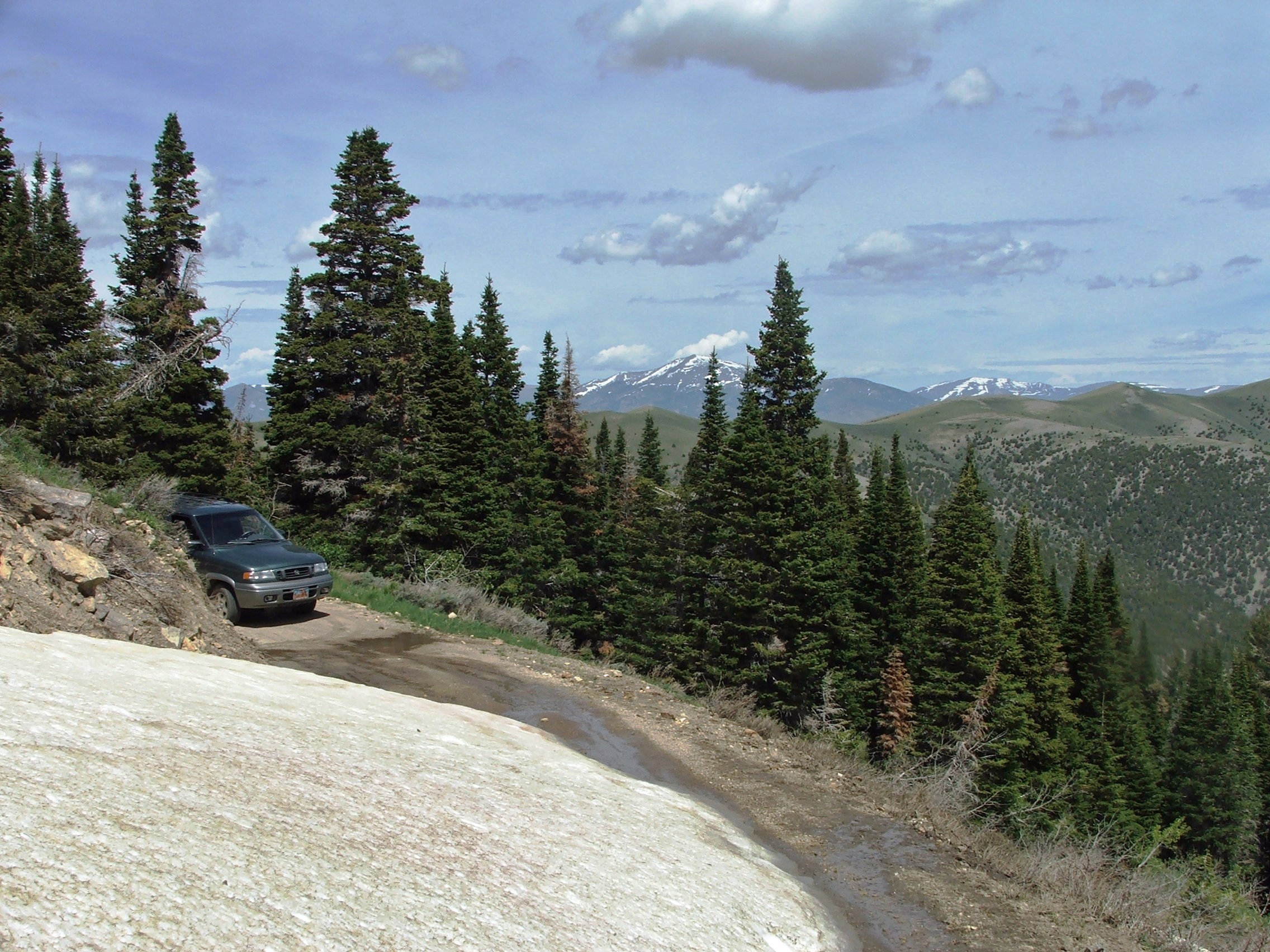
Road along a snowbank in the Raft River Mountains

The peaks of the Raft River Mountains
Mountain Peak	Elevation	Prominence	Isolation	Location
Bull Mountain	9,925 ft 3025 m	3,725 ft 1135 m	24.3 mi 39.2 km	41.9117°N 113.3654°W
George Peak	9,601 ft 2926 m	581 ft 177 m	6.21 mi 9.99 km	41.8893°N 113.4831°W
Peak 9,335	9,335 ft 2845 m	515 ft 157 m	3.14 mi 5.05 km	41.9296°N 113.4211°W
Peak 8,402	8,402 ft 2561 m	582 ft 177 m	2.03 mi 3.27 km	41.9143°N 113.5039°W
Mahagony Peaks	8,340 ft 2542 m	480 ft 146 m	4.93 mi 7.93 km	41.8809°N 113.5884°W
Peak 8,220 East	8,220 ft 2505 m	320 ft 98 m	2.8 mi 4.51 km	41.8649°N 113.5384°W
Peak 8,220 West	8,220 ft 2505 m	320 ft 98 m	1.85 mi 2.98 km	41.8621°N 113.5628°W
Peak 8,140	8,140 ft 2481 m	738 ft 225 m	2.45 mi 3.94 km	41.8724°N 113.6357°W
Bally Mountains High Point	8,060 ft 2457 m	671 ft 205 m	3.59 mi 5.78 km	41.9638°N 113.4737°W
Peak 7,980	7,980 ft 2432 m	440 ft 134 m	6.32 mi 10.17 km	41.8976°N 113.2443°W
Peak 7,875	7,875 ft 2400 m	336 ft 102 m	2.94 mi 4.73 km	41.8694°N 113.3515°W
Crystal Peak	7,780 ft 2371 m	354 ft 108 m	1.69 mi 2.72 km	41.9188°N 113.2278°W
Bald Knoll	7,484 ft 2281 m	474 ft 144 m	2.84 mi 4.57 km	41.8643°N 113.2766°W
Black Hills High Point	7,100 ft 2164 m	400 ft 122 m	2.07 mi 3.33 km	41.8337°N 113.5503°W
