= Jones House =

Jones House may refer to:

== United States ==
(by state, then city)

- William C. Jones House, Eutaw, Alabama
- Phelps–Jones House, Huntsville, Alabama
- Gov. Thomas G. Jones House, Montgomery, Alabama
- Wycough–Jones House, Batesville, Arkansas
- E. Fay and Gus Jones House, Fayetteville, Arkansas
- Arthur J. Jones House, Little Rock, Arkansas, listed on the NRHP in Little Rock, Arkansas
- Scipio A. Jones House, Little Rock, Arkansas
- Mark P. Jones House, Searcy, Arkansas
- Jones House (Sulphur Springs, Arkansas)
- Edward L. Jones House, Paradise Valley, Arizona
- McCullagh–Jones House, Los Gatos, California
- Theophilus Jones House, Wallingford, Connecticut
- Enoch Jones House, Clayton, Delaware
- Justis–Jones House, Wilmington, Delaware
- Charles William Jones House, Pensacola, Florida
- Reid–Jones–Carpenter House, Augusta, Georgia, listed on then
- Jones, Walter, Rock House, Good Hope, Georgia, listed on the NRHP in Walton County, Georgia
- Pearl J. Jones House, Hartwell, Georgia, listed on the NRHP in Hart County, Georgia
- Jones–Florence Plantation, Odessadale, Georgia, listed on the NRHP in Meriwether County, Georgia
- Abe Jones House, Watkinsville, Georgia, listed on the NRHP in Oconee County, Georgia
- John James Jones House, Waynesboro, Georgia
- Jedd Jones House, Malad City, Idaho
- Jones House (Pontiac, Illinois)
- Lewis Jones House (Centerville, Indiana)
- Colonel William Jones House, Gentryville, Indiana
- Margaret and George Riley Jones House, Muncie, Indiana
- Tauy Jones House, Ottawa, Kansas
- Underwood–Jones House, Bowling Green, Kentucky, listed on the NRHP in Warren County, Kentucky
- Jones–Willis House, Brandenburg, Kentucky, listed on the NRHP in Meade County, Kentucky
- Moses Jones House, Harrodsburg, Kentucky, listed on the NRHP in Mercer County, Kentucky
- Jones House (Valley Station, Kentucky), listed on the NRHP in Jefferson County, Kentucky
- Jones House (Gibsland, Louisiana)
- Wade H. Jones, Sr., House, Meeker, Louisiana
- Jones House (Melrose, Louisiana)
- Jerry Jones House, Melrose, Louisiana, listed on the NRHP in Natchitoches Parish, Louisiana
- John Carroll Jones House, Natchez, Louisiana, listed on the NRHP in Natchitoches Parish, Louisiana
- Abel Jones House, China, Maine
- Eli and Sybil Jones House, South China, Maine
- Abraham Jones House, Libertytown, Maryland
- William R. Jones House, Cambridge, Massachusetts
- John Jones House (Stoneham, Massachusetts)
- Thomas W. Jones House, Stoneham, Massachusetts
- Marshall W. Jones House, Winchester, Massachusetts
- Carroll Jones House, Marcellus, Michigan, listed as a Michigan State Historic site
- G. W. Jones House, Marcellus, Michigan, Marcellus, Michigan, listed as a Michigan State Historic site
- Jones–Roberts Farmstead, Lake Crystal, Minnesota, listed on the NRHP in Blue Earth County, Minnesota
- Harry W. Jones House, Minneapolis, Minnesota
- Jones–Banks–Leigh House, Columbus, Mississippi, listed on the NRHP in Lowndes County, Mississippi
- Dudley Jones House, Terry, Mississippi
- Lewis Jones House (Independence, Missouri), listed on the NRHP in Jackson County, Missouri
- William Cuthbert Jones House, St. Louis, Missouri, listed on the NRHP in St. Louis, Missouri
- Harry T. Jones House, Seward, Nebraska
- Plumer–Jones Farm, Milton, New Hampshire, listed on the NRHP
- John Paul Jones House, Portsmouth, New Hampshire
- Benjamin Jones House, Pemberton, New Jersey, listed on the NRHP in Burlington County, New Jersey
- Everret Jones House, Santa Fe, New Mexico, listed on the NRHP in Santa Fe County, New Mexico
- Samuel and Johanna Jones Farm, Amsterdam, New York
- Gen. Edward F. Jones House, Binghamton, New York
- A.D. (Boss) Jones House, Duanesburg, New York
- John W. Jones House, Elmira, New York
- George Westinghouse Jones House, Niskayuna, New York
- John Jones Homestead, Van Cortlandtville, New York
- Dr. Beverly Jones House, Bethania, North Carolina
- Jones House (Boone, North Carolina)
- Nancy Jones House, Cary, North Carolina
- Hamilton C. Jones III House, Charlotte, North Carolina
- Cullen and Elizabeth Jones House, Edenton, North Carolina
- Jones–Lee House, Greenville, North Carolina
- Laurel Mill and Col. Jordan Jones House, Gupton, North Carolina
- Rev. Joshua D. Jones House, Mill Spring, North Carolina
- Jones–Jarvis House, New Bern, North Carolina
- Tisdale–Jones House, New Bern, North Carolina
- Alpheus Jones House, Raleigh, North Carolina
- Crabtree Jones House, Raleigh, North Carolina
- Jones–Wright House, Rocky Ford, North Carolina
- Jesse Fuller Jones House, Spring Green, North Carolina
- Dr. Calvin Jones House, Wake Forest, North Carolina
- Jones–Bowman House, Columbiana, Ohio
- W.H. Jones Mansion, Columbus, Ohio
- Elijah Pelton Jones House, Findlay, Ohio, listed on the NRHP in Hancock County, Ohio
- Elam Jones Public House, Hartford, Ohio, listed on the NRHP in Trumbull County, Ohio
- Jones–Cutler House, Jasper, Ohio, listed on the NRHP in Pike County, Ohio
- John J. Jones House, Madison, Ohio, listed on the NRHP in Lake County, Ohio
- Jones–Read–Touvelle House, Wauseon, Ohio
- Charles G. Jones Farmstead, Jones, Oklahoma, listed on the NRHP in Oklahoma County, Oklahoma
- Robert Lawton Jones House, Tulsa, Oklahoma, listed on the NRHP in Tulsa County, Oklahoma
- Simpson E. Jones House, Bend, Oregon
- Clarence H. Jones House, Portland, Oregon
- Dr. Noble Wiley Jones House, Portland, Oregon
- Jones–Sherman House, Salem, Oregon
- Benjamin F. Jones Cottage, Cresson, Pennsylvania
- James Jones House, Greensboro, Pennsylvania
- A.C. Jones House, Batesburg, South Carolina
- Tom Jones Ranch, Midland, South Dakota, listed on the NRHP in Jackson County, South Dakota
- Mack Jones House, Miller, South Dakota, listed on the NRHP in Hand County, South Dakota
- Mabel and David Jones House, Watertown, South Dakota, listed on the NRHP in Codington County, South Dakota
- David Jones House (Tuckaleechee Pike, Maryville, Tennessee)
- David Jones House (High Street, Maryville, Tennessee)
- Enoch H. Jones House, Murfreesboro, Tennessee
- J. B. Jones House, Oak Ridge, Tennessee
- A. T. Jones House, Abilene, Texas, listed on the NRHP in Taylor County, Texas
- George Washington Jones House (Bastrop, Texas), listed on the NRHP in Bastrop County, Texas
- Oliver P. Jones House, Bastrop, Texas, listed on the NRHP in Bastrop County, Texas
- McDougal–Jones House, Bryan, Texas, listed on the NRHP in Brazos County, Texas
- J. M. Jones House, Bryan, Texas, listed on the NRHP in Brazos County, Texas
- Jones House (Houston, Texas), listed on the NRHP in Brazos County, Texas
- Jones–Hunt House, Houston, Texas, listed on the NRHP in Harris County, Texas
  - (See Courtlandt Place, Houston#Jones–Hunt House)
- Nance–Jones House, Kingsville, Texas, listed on the NRHP in Kleberg County, Texas
- Roland Jones House, Nacogdoches, Texas, listed on the NRHP in Nacogdoches County, Texas
- Jones Farm (Sanger, Texas), listed on the National Register of Historic Places in Denton County, Texas
- Thomas Jones House (Beaver, Utah)
- Frederick Isaac and Mary M. Jones House, Monticello, Utah
- Elizabeth M. Jones House, Park City, Utah, listed on the NRHP in Summit County, Utah
- David H. Jones House, Spanish Fork, Utah
- Jones Farm (Kenbridge, Virginia)
- Matthew Jones House, Newport News, Virginia
- James Ellwood Jones House, Switchback, West Virginia
- Samuel S. Jones Cobblestone House, Clinton, Wisconsin
- John A. and Maggie Jones House, Columbus, Wisconsin
- Fred B. Jones Estate, Delavan Lake, Wisconsin
- David J. and Maggie Jones House, Dodgeville, Wisconsin
- John H. Jones House, Janesville, Wisconsin
- Huff Jones House, Oconto, Wisconsin
- Robert O. Jones House, Waukesha, Wisconsin
- Granville D. Jones House, Wausau, Wisconsin

== See also ==
- Jones Farm (disambiguation)
- David Jones House (disambiguation)
- John Jones House (disambiguation)
- Lewis Jones House (disambiguation)
- Thomas Jones House (disambiguation)
- William Jones House (disambiguation)
