= John Jones House =

John Jones House may refer to:

- John James Jones House, Waynesboro, Georgia, listed on the National Register of Historic Places (NRHP) in Burke County
- John Carroll Jones House, Natchez, Louisiana, listed on the NRHP in Natchitoches Parish
- John Jones House (Stoneham, Massachusetts), NRHP-listed
- John Paul Jones House, Portsmouth, New Hampshire, NRHP-listed
- John W. Jones House, Elmira, New York, NRHP-listed
- John Jones Homestead, Van Cortlandtville, New York, NRHP-listed
- John J. Jones House, Madison, Ohio, listed on the NRHP in Lake County
- John H. Jones House, Janesville, Wisconsin, listed on the NRHP in Rock County

== See also ==
- Jones House (disambiguation)
