= Thomas Jones House =

Thomas Jones House may refer to:

- Thomas W. Jones House, Stoneham, Massachusetts, listed on the National Register of Historic Places (NRHP)
- Tom Jones Ranch, Midland, South Dakota, listed on the NRHP in Jackson County, South Dakota
- Thomas Jones House (Beaver, Utah), listed on the NRHP in Beaver County, Utah

== See also ==
- Jones House (disambiguation)
