= Lewis Jones House =

Lewis Jones House

- Lewis Jones House (Centerville, Indiana), listed on the NRHP in Indiana
- Lewis Jones House (Independence, Missouri), listed on the NRHP in Jackson County, Missouri

== See also ==
- Jones House (disambiguation)
