= Jones Farm =

Jones Farm may refer to:

- Jones Farm (Sanger, Texas), listed on the National Register of Historic Places in Denton County, Texas
- Jones Farm (Kenbridge, Virginia), listed on the National Register of Historic Places in Lunenburg County

== See also ==
- Jones House (disambiguation)
