= David Jones House =

David Jones House may refer to:

- David Jones House (Tuckaleechee Pike, Maryville, Tennessee), listed on the National Register of Historic Places (NRHP)
- David Jones House (High Street, Maryville, Tennessee), NRHP-listed
- David H. Jones House, Spanish Fork, Utah, NRHP-listed in Utah County
- David J. and Maggie Jones House, Dodgeville, Wisconsin, listed on the National Register of Historic Places in Iowa County

== See also ==
- Jones House (disambiguation)
