= William Jones House =

William Jones House may refer to:

- William C. Jones House, Eutaw, Alabama
- William R. Jones House, Cambridge, Massachusetts
- Colonel William Jones House, Gentryville, Indiana
- William Cuthbert Jones House, St. Louis, Missouri, listed on the NRHP in St. Louis, Missouri

== See also ==
- Jones House (disambiguation)
