= Jones–Read–Touvelle House =

Historic house in Ohio, United States

- U.S. National Register of Historic Places
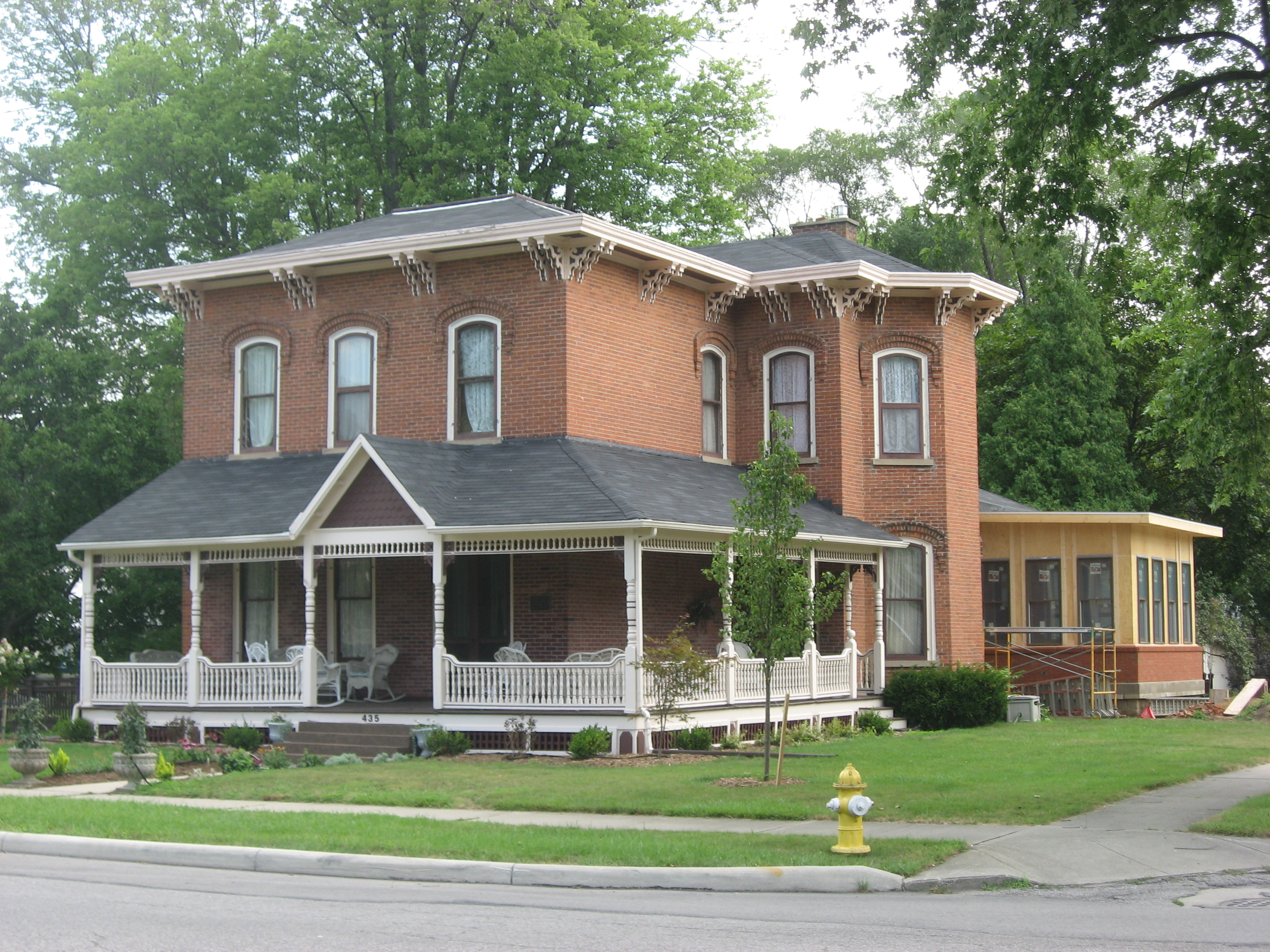
- Front and southern side of the house

- Location within Ohio Location within the United States
- Location: 435 E. Park St., Wauseon, Ohio
- Coordinates: 41°32′35″N 84°8′22″W
- Area: less than one acre
- Built: 1875
- Architectural style: Italianate, Queen Anne
- NRHP reference No.: 87000632
- Added to NRHP: May 8, 1987

The Jones–Read–Touvelle House is a historic building in Wauseon, Ohio, United States. Located along Park Street south of downtown, this ornate brick house sits on a corner lot adjacent to a city park. Architectural historians have seen the Jones–Read–Touvelle House as a fine example of the combination of multiple architectural styles: most of the house itself appears to be Italianate, but the porch and some of the other details are plainly those of the Queen Anne style.

Built on a limestone foundation, the house is a brick structure covered with an asphalt roof. Among its most prominent architectural features are its narrow but tall windows topped with arches of brick, the pairs of brackets that support the eaves of the house's hip roof, the double doors of the front entrance, and the ornate Queen Anne detailing of the porch.

Although the house was built by a Dr. Philo Jones, it was purchased by a John A. Read in May 1876, just a year after its completion. Read was a leading member of the Wauseon business society; after founding a combined general and drug store in the city in 1863, he was successful enough to split the drug store away as its own business in 1870, and he further expanded it by 1880 to the point that it was a sizeable pharmaceutical company.

In 1987, the Jones–Read–Touvelle House was listed on the National Register of Historic Places. Key to this designation was its well-preserved historic architecture, which was seen as significant locally. It is one of four Wauseon buildings and six properties throughout Fulton County to be included on the Register.
