= Jones House (Melrose, Louisiana) =

Historic house in Louisiana, United States

- U.S. National Register of Historic Places
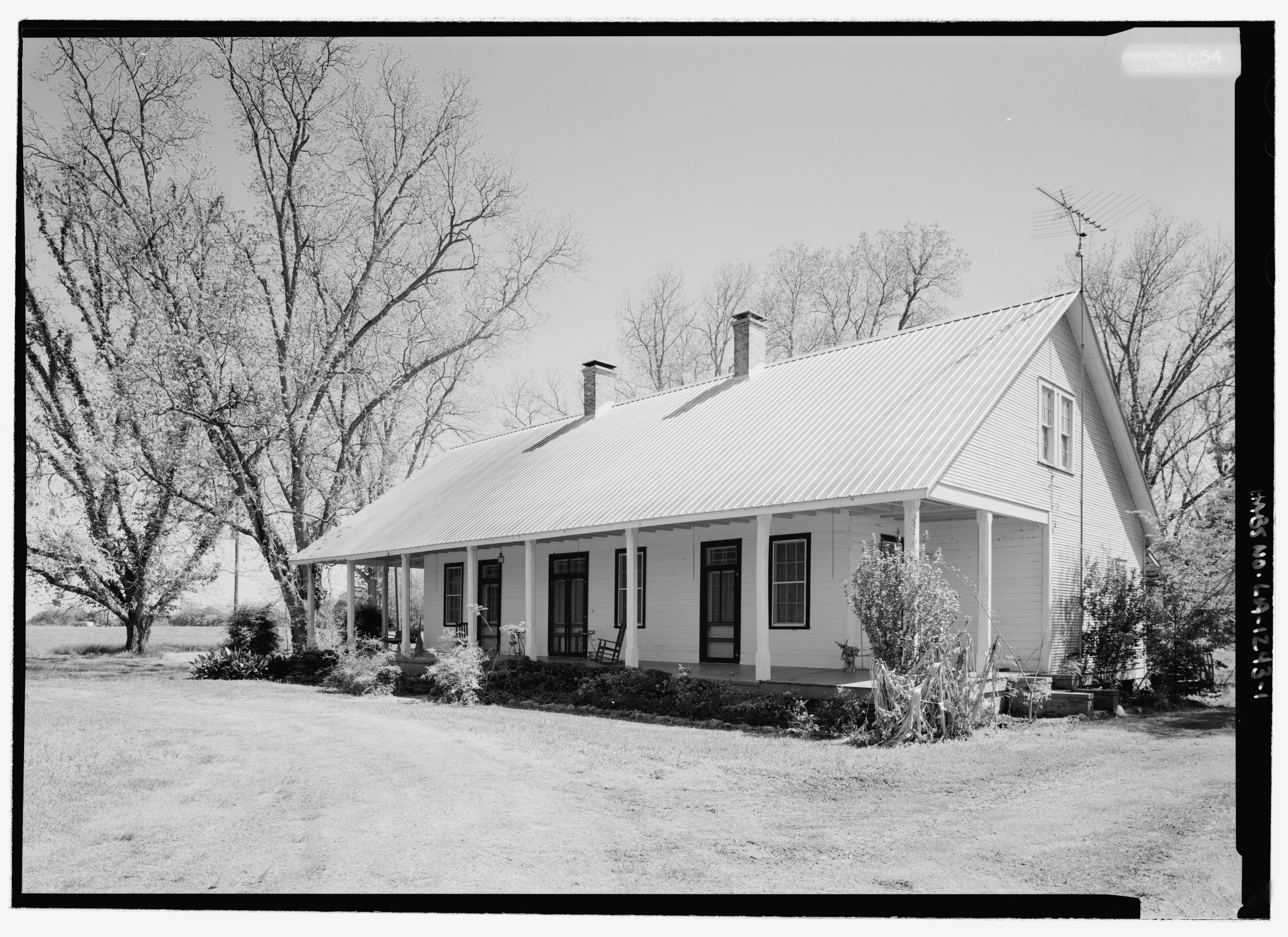

- Location within Louisiana Location within the United States
- Location: 2648 Louisiana Highway 484 on Cane River Lake near Melrose, Louisiana
- Coordinates: 31°35′00″N 92°57′41″W
- Area: 1.1 acres (0.45 ha)
- Built: 1847
- Architectural style: French Creole
- MPS: Louisiana's French Creole Architecture MPS
- NRHP reference No.: 93000937
- Added to NRHP: September 9, 1993

The Jones House, on Louisiana Highway 154 along Cane River Lake near Melrose in Natchitoches Parish, Louisiana, was built in 1847. It was listed on the National Register of Historic Places in 1993.

Its NRHP nomination states:

The Jones House helps establish the significance of Natchitoches Parish as a center of the Creole style. It is particularly important for its three elegant mantel/overmantel ensembles, a feature found in only the most elegant and "upmarket" Creole houses in Louisiana. In this, it is in sharp contrast to the general trend in Natchitoches Parish of large, plain Creole houses with little in the way of intricate ornamentation. It is one of only two houses having mantel/overmantel ensembles. (The other is Melrose Plantation House, a National Historic Landmark.) Finally, it is the only known surviving house to have the lozenge shaped design so popular in Louisiana's French Creole architecture.
