= Phelps–Jones House =

Historic house in Alabama, United States

- U.S. National Register of Historic Places
- Alabama Register of Landmarks and Heritage
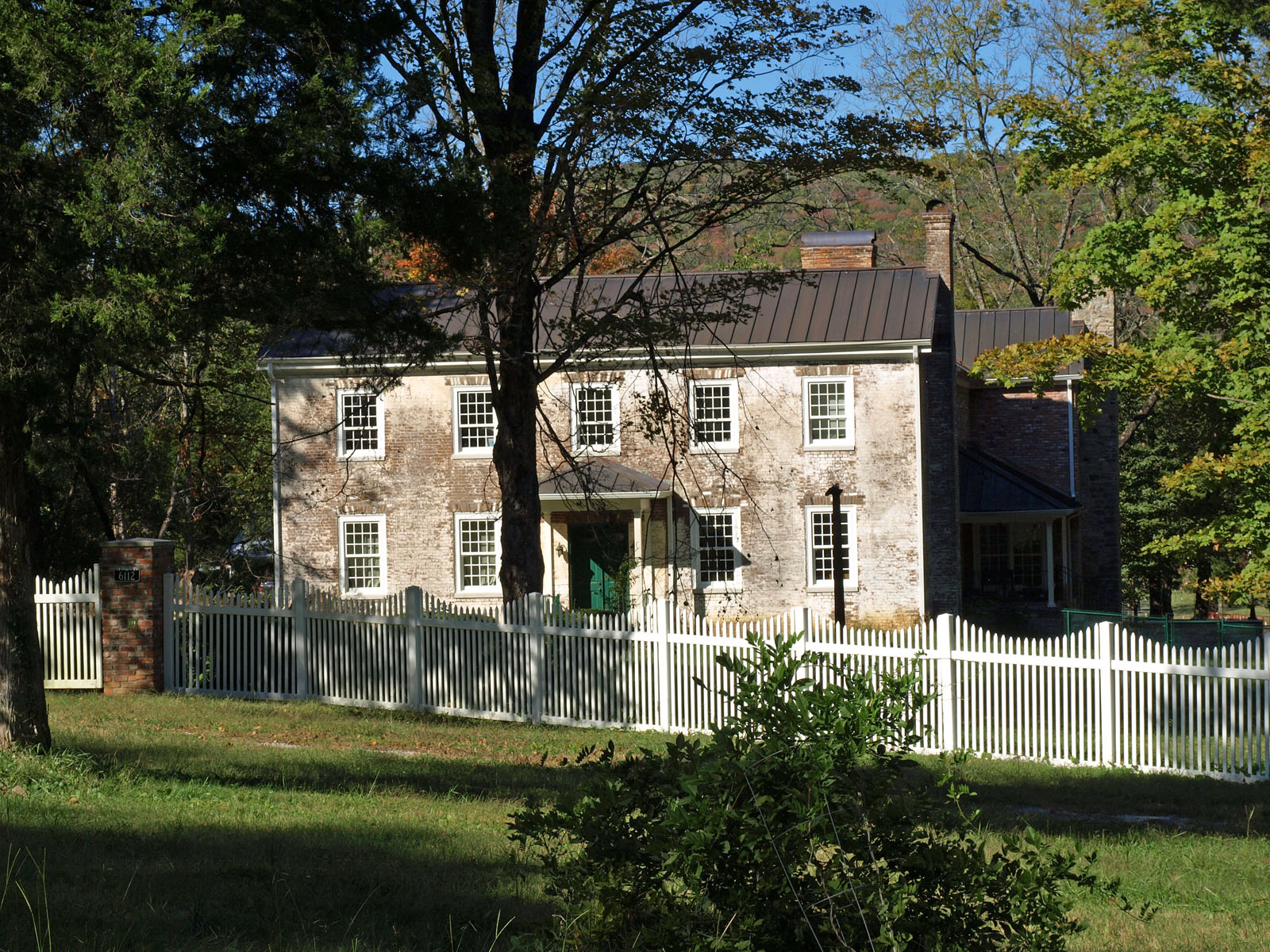
- The house in October 2011

- Location within Huntsville, Alabama Location within Alabama Location within the United States
- Location: 6112 Pulaski Pike, Huntsville, Alabama
- Coordinates: 34°48′2″N 86°37′10″W
- Area: 4.1 acres (1.7 ha)
- Built: 1818
- Architectural style: Georgian, Federal
- NRHP reference No.: 82002053

Significant dates
- Added to NRHP: February 19, 1982
- Designated ARLH: January 31, 1979

The Phelps–Jones House is a historic residence in Huntsville, Alabama. One of the oldest buildings in Alabama, it was built in 1818, shortly after the initial federal land sale in Madison County in 1809. Despite having many owners, the original character of the house has remained. The two-story house is built of brick laid in Flemish bond, and has Federal and Georgian details. The original block has a bedroom and parlor separated by a central hall, with a dining room in an ell to the northeast. Staircases in the hall and dining room led to three bedrooms on the second floor. In 1956, a porch in the crook of the ell was enclosed, adding a bathroom and small bedroom. Another porch off the rear of the dining room was enclosed and converted into a kitchen. Interior woodwork, including six mantels, is in provincial Federal style. The façade is five bays wide, with twelve-over-twelve sash windows on the ground floor and twelve-over-eight on the second. A narrow hipped roof porch covers the double front door; originally a wider porch covered a single door flanked by narrow sidelights and topped with a transom. The house was listed on the Alabama Register of Landmarks and Heritage in 1979 and the National Register of Historic Places in 1982.
