= Margaret and George Riley Jones House =

Historic house in Indiana, United States

- U.S. National Register of Historic Places
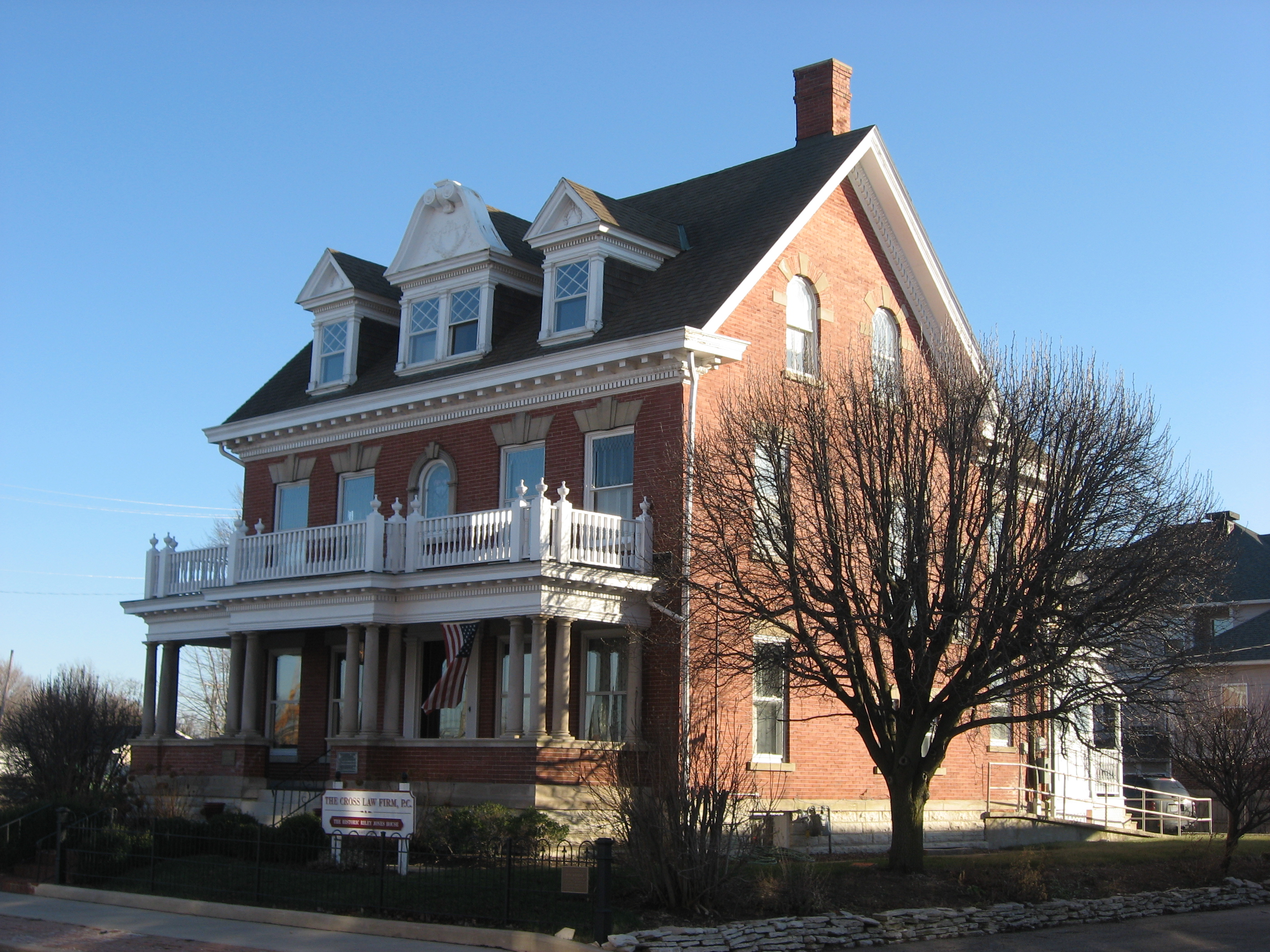
- Margaret and George Riley Jones House, January 2012

- Location within Indiana Location within the United States
- Location: 315 E. Charles St., Muncie, Indiana
- Coordinates: 40°11′27″N 85°23′1″W
- Area: less than one acre
- Built: 1901
- Architect: Alfred Grindle
- Architectural style: Colonial Revival
- NRHP reference No.: 84001017
- Added to NRHP: September 27, 1984

Margaret and George Riley Jones House, also known as the Riley-Jones Club, Inc., is a historic home located at Muncie, Indiana. It was built in 1901, and is a 2 1/2-story, "L"-plan, Colonial Revival style frame dwelling sheathed in brick. It features a gable roof with dormers, arched windows, and full-width front porch with mosaic tile floor. It housed a private women's club. The club closed in 2003 and the building now houses law offices.

It was added to the National Register of Historic Places in 1984.
