= Theophilus Jones House =

Historic house in Connecticut, United States

- U.S. National Register of Historic Places
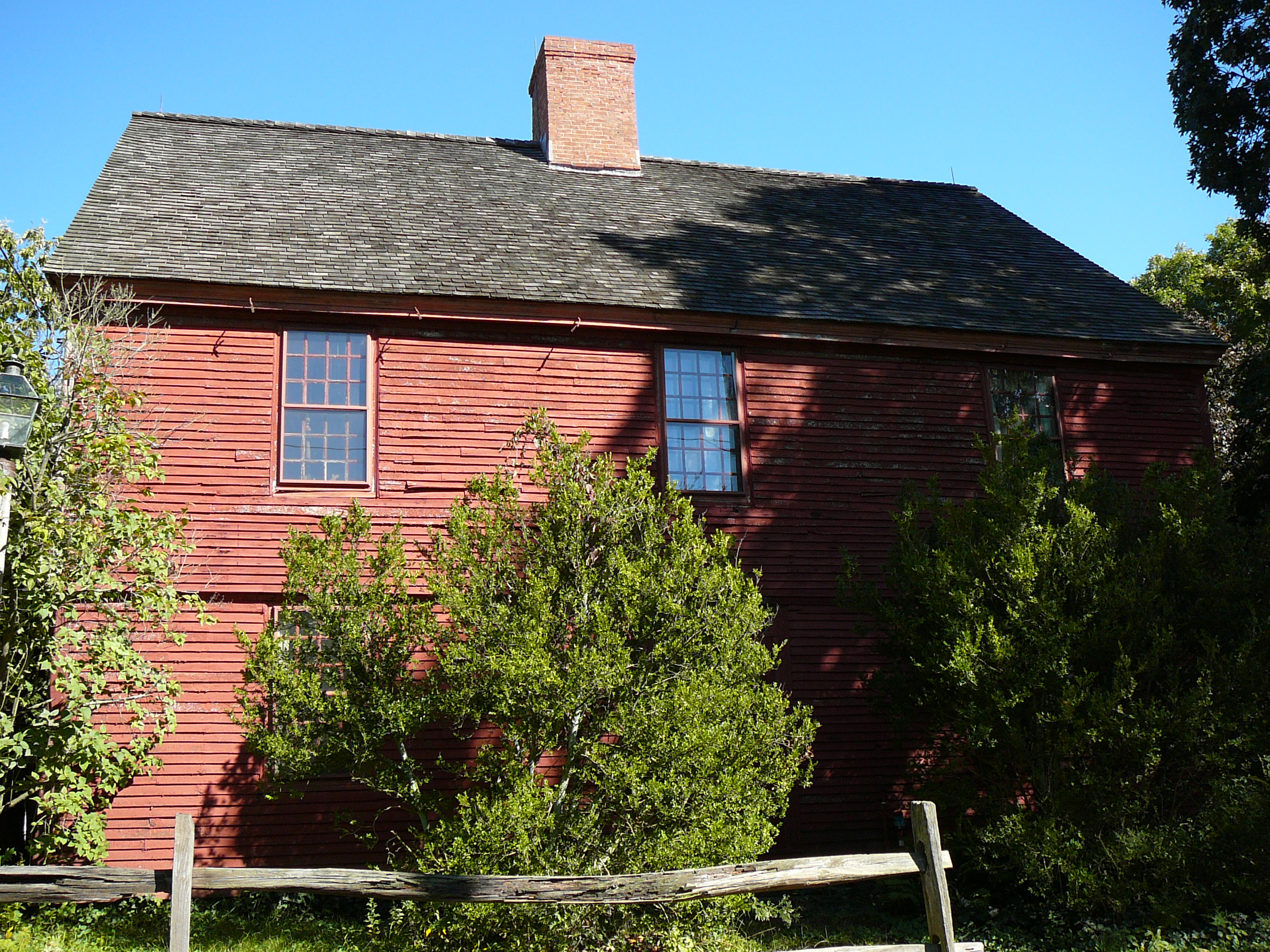

- Location within Connecticut Location within the United States
- Location: 40 Jones Road, Wallingford, Connecticut
- Coordinates: 41°26′51″N 72°51′10″W
- Area: 1.8 acres (0.73 ha)
- Architectural style: Colonial
- NRHP reference No.: 91001981
- Added to NRHP: January 30, 1992

The Theophilus Jones House is a historic house at 40 Jones Road in Wallingford, Connecticut. Built about 1740, it is one of the town's oldest surviving buildings, also notable for its restoration in the 1940s by Charles F. Montgomery. It was listed on the National Register of Historic Places in 1992.

== Description and history ==
The Theophilus Jones House stands in a residential area southwest of downtown Wallingford, on the west side of Jones Road south of Apple Tree Lane. It is a 2 1/2-story wood-frame structure, with a gabled roof, central chimney, and clapboarded exterior. The main facade is three bays wide, with sash windows arranged symmetrically around the center entrance. The second floor has a slight overhang over the first floor, and windows on both levels butt against eaves. The entrance is simply framed, with a multilight transom window above. The interior is a combination of original, recycled, and reproduction finishes.

The house was built about 1740 by Theophilus Jones, whose grandfather William was one of the original settlers of the New Haven Colony. The house and farm holdings around it remained in the Jones family until 1914, after which the farmland was progressively sold off for residential development. The house was purchased in 1937 by Charles F. Montgomery, a leading authority on American decorative arts. Montgomery lived here until 1950, during which period he undertook an extensive restoration of the property to its 18th-century appearance, removing many layers of 19th and early 20th-century finishes, reproducing some elements, and apparently relocating others.

== See also ==
- National Register of Historic Places listings in New Haven County, Connecticut
