= Huff Jones House =

Historic house in Wisconsin, United States

- U.S. National Register of Historic Places
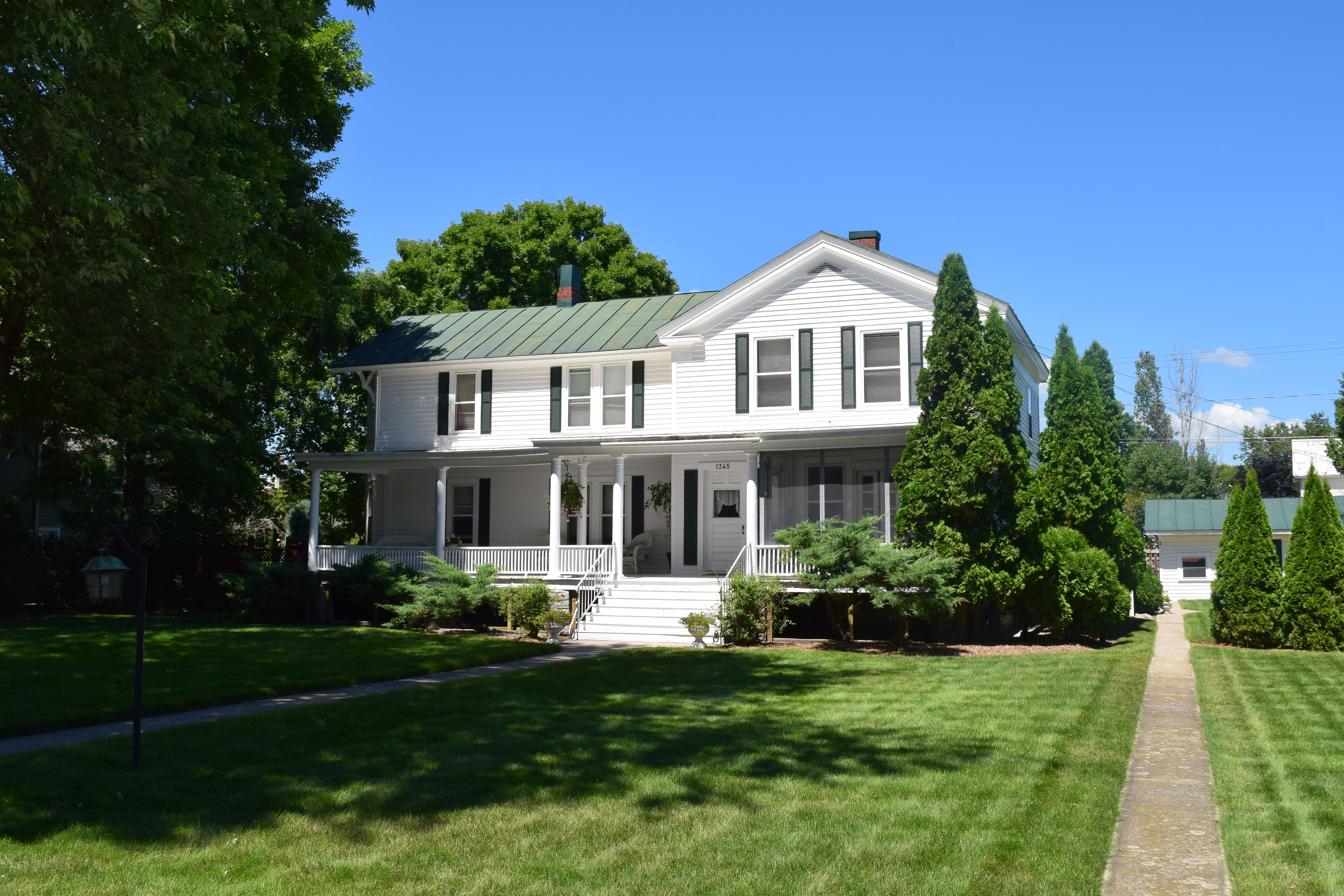
- Huff Jones House
- Location: 1345 Main St, Oconto, Wisconsin
- Coordinates: 44°53′14″N 87°51′46″W
- Area: 0.6 acres (0.24 ha)
- Built: 1857
- Architect: Huff Jones
- Architectural style: Greek Revival
- NRHP reference No.: 78000122
- Added to NRHP: December 22, 1978

The Huff Jones House is located in Oconto, Wisconsin. It was listed on the National Register of Historic Places in 1978 and on the State Register of Historic Places in 1989.
