= Granville D. Jones House =

Historic house in Wisconsin, United States

- Granville D. Jones
- U.S. National Register of Historic Places
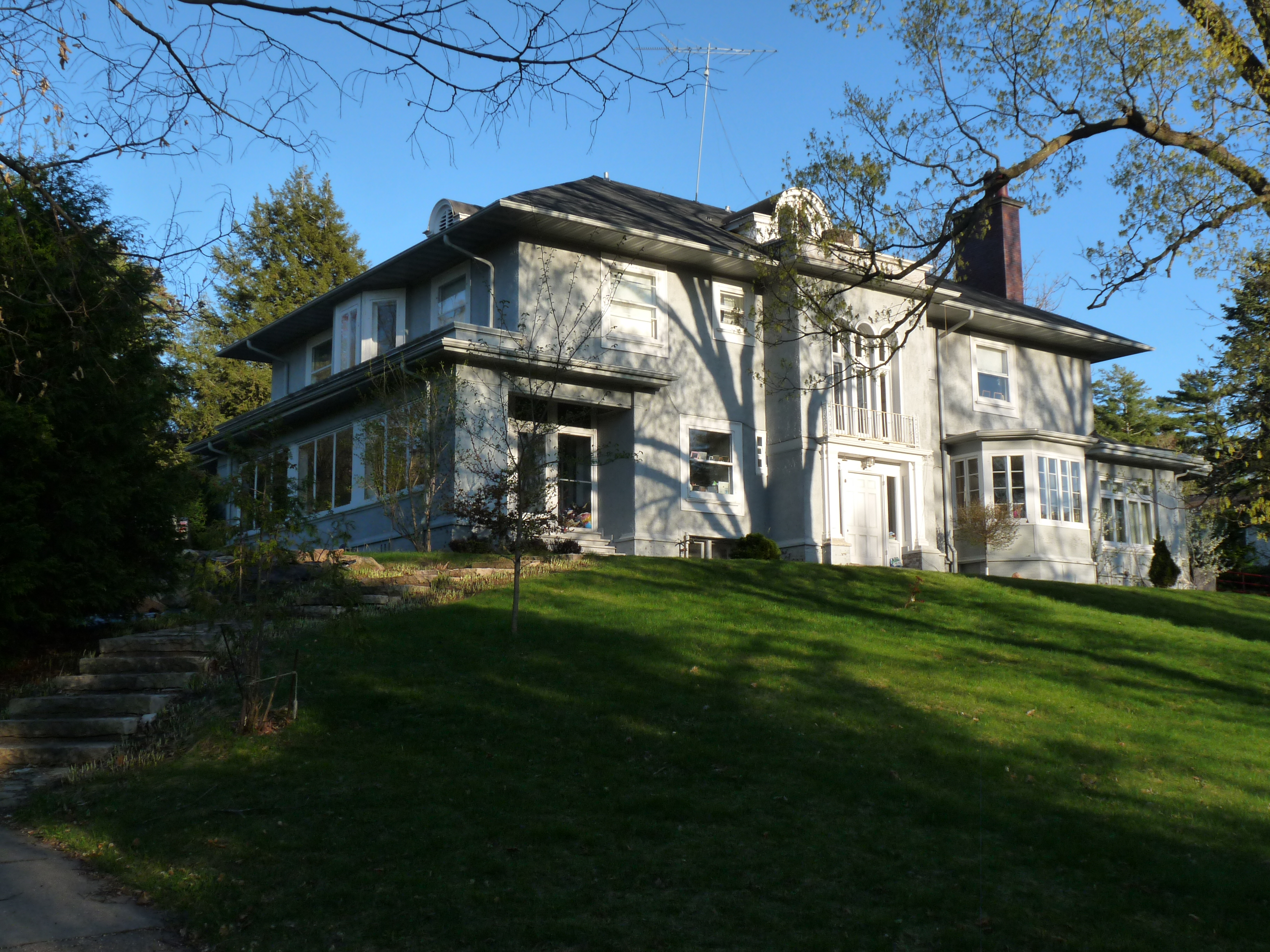

- Location within Wisconsin Location within the United States
- Location: 915 Grant St. Wausau, Wisconsin
- Coordinates: 44°57′42″N 89°37′0″W
- Built: 1904
- Architect: George W. Maher
- Architectural style: Prairie School
- NRHP reference No.: 77000036
- Added to NRHP: December 7, 1977

The Granville D. Jones House in Wausau, Wisconsin, United States was designed by George W. Maher in Prairie Style and built in 1904. It was added to the National Register of Historic Places in 1977.

== History ==
Granville Jones was a New Yorker born in 1856, who moved to Wisconsin and taught in Fond du Lac County, then graduated from the University of Wisconsin and became principal of the high school in Wisconsin Rapids. In 1884, he began working at a Wausau law firm and was admitted to the bar in 1886. He founded the Wausau Telephone Company and the G. D. Jones Land Company, encouraged other Wausau businessmen to invest together in new businesses, and was involved in other businesses, including Employers Mutual Insurance Company, Wausau Sulphite Paper Company, and the First National Bank of Wausau.

Jones served on the Wausau school board for twenty years, encouraging students to pursue higher education. He served two terms as a regent of the University of Wisconsin. As a regent, Jones pushed to punish Professor Richard T. Ely for teaching socialist ideas, which led to the "sifting and winnowing" statement. He and another regent censured Professor Eugene Allen Gilmore for researching the right of the state to control its waters. And he led a movement to reprimand Professor Edward Ross for allowing an anarchist to address his sociology class.
