= Jones House (Sulphur Springs, Arkansas) =

Historic house in Arkansas, United States

- U.S. National Register of Historic Places
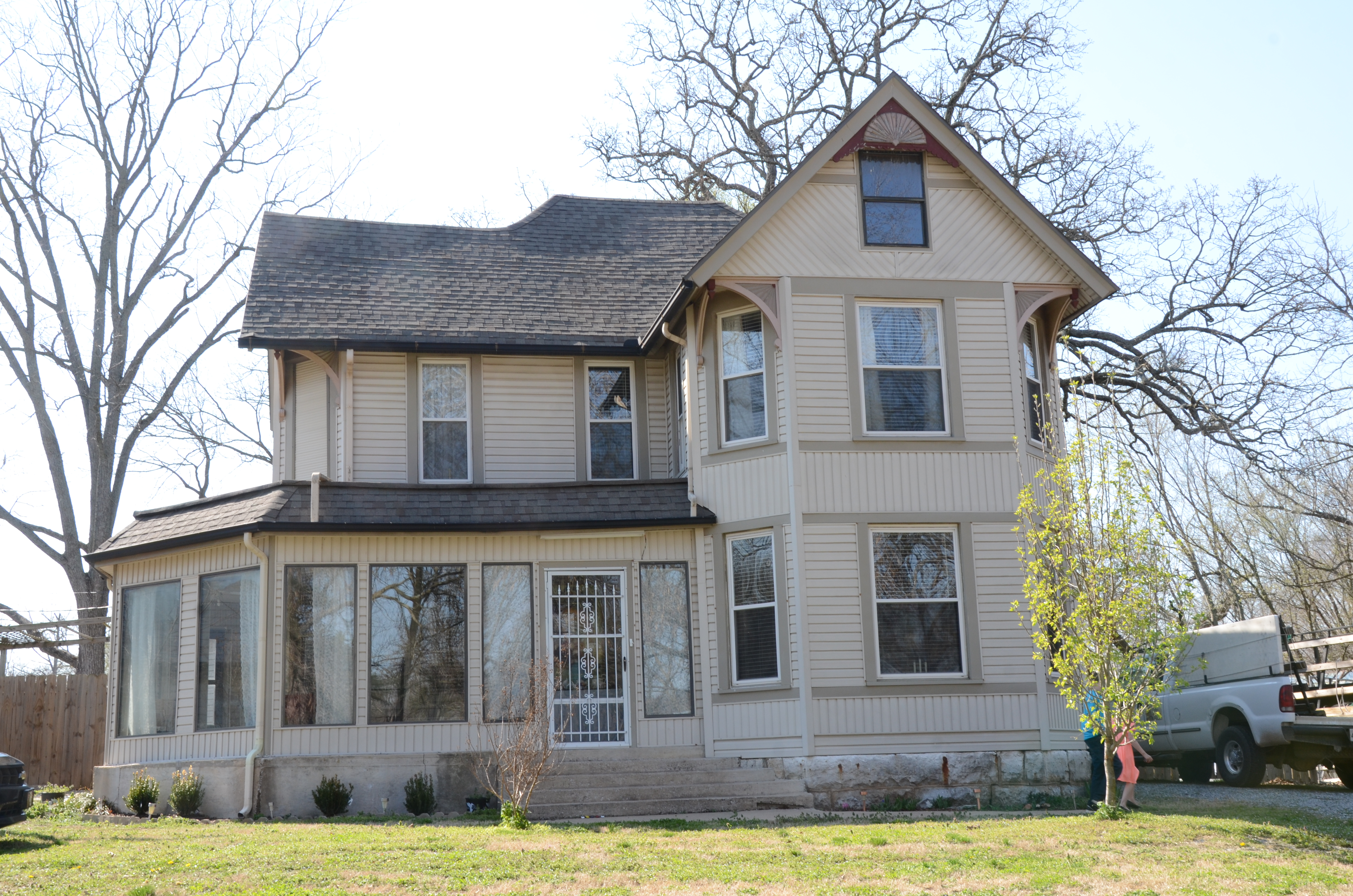

- Location within Arkansas Location within the United States
- Location: 220 Bush St., Sulphur Springs, Benton County, Arkansas
- Coordinates: 36°28′48″N 94°27′34″W
- Area: less than one acre
- Built: 1896
- Architectural style: Stick/eastlake
- MPS: Benton County MRA
- NRHP reference No.: 87002363
- Added to NRHP: January 28, 1988

The Jones House is a historic house at 220 Bush Street in Sulphur Springs, Benton County, Arkansas. It is a 2 1/2-story wood-frame structure with a T shape and cross-gable roof. The front facade, one of the ends of the crosspiece of the T, has beveled corners with the roof overhanging above the second floor, an Eastlake element. A porch wraps around the stem of the T, which extends to the south. Built c. 1896, it is a fine and well-preserved example of Eastlake-style architecture.

The house was listed on the National Register of Historic Places in 1988.

== See also ==
- National Register of Historic Places listings in Benton County, Arkansas
