= Justis–Jones House =

Historic house in Delaware, United States

- U.S. National Register of Historic Places
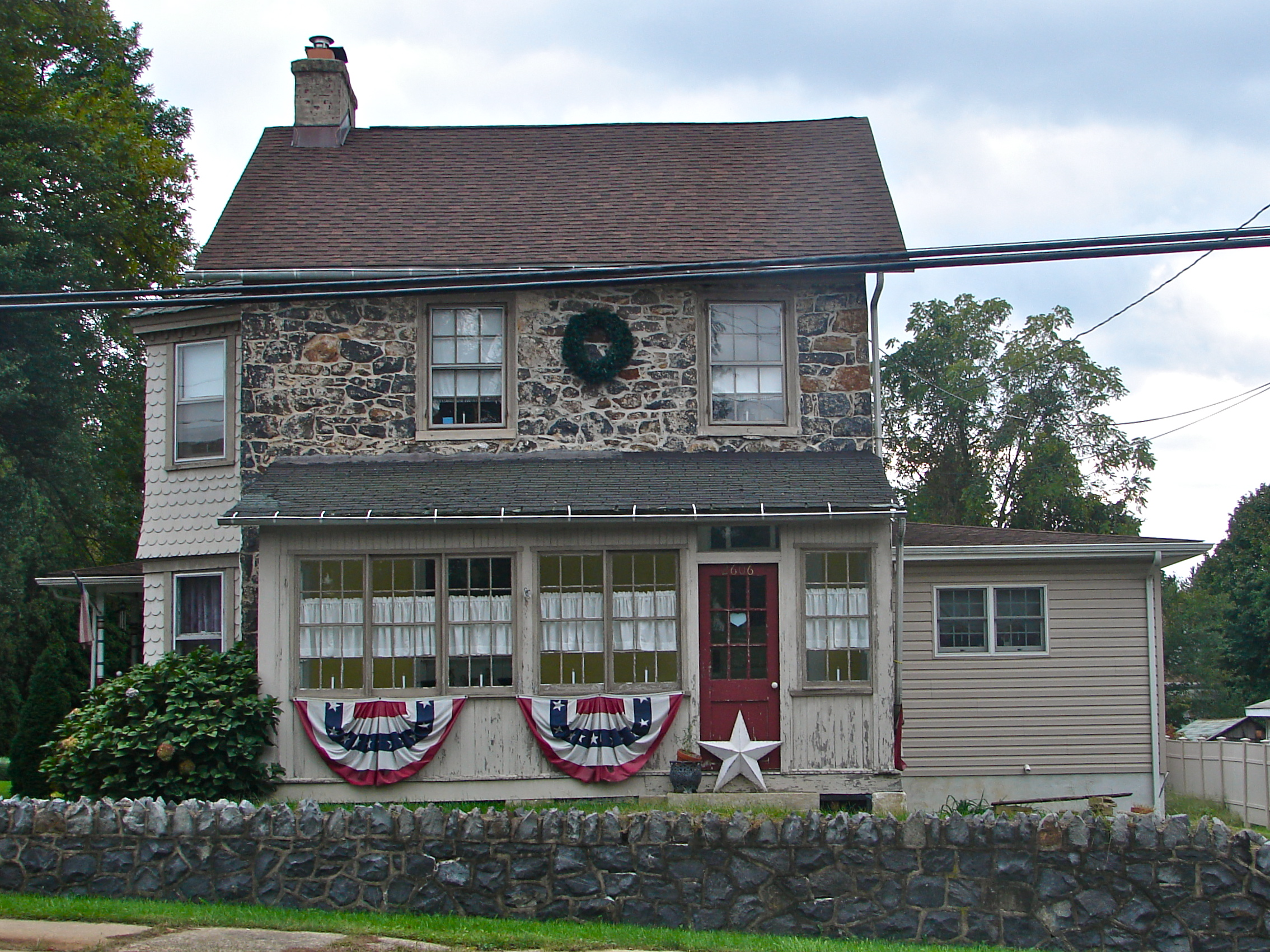
- Justis–Jones House, October 2011

- Location within Delaware Location within the United States
- Location: 2606 Newport Gap Pike, near Wilmington, Delaware
- Coordinates: 39°44′36″N 75°38′25″W
- Area: 0.5 acres (0.20 ha)
- Built: c. 1840
- Architectural style: Greek Revival, Late 19th And Early 20th Century American Movements
- NRHP reference No.: 98001096
- Added to NRHP: August 28, 1998

Justis–Jones House, also known as the Henry S. McComb House, is a historic home located near Wilmington, New Castle County, Delaware. The original section was built about 1840, and is a two-story, two-bay, nearly square gable-roofed fieldstone dwelling in a vernacular Greek Revival style. A frame rear wing constructed in two phases between 1904 and 1924. Also on the property is a contributing frame garage dating to about 1920.

It was added to the National Register of Historic Places in 1998.
