= E. Fay and Gus Jones House =

Historic house in Arkansas, United States

- U.S. National Register of Historic Places
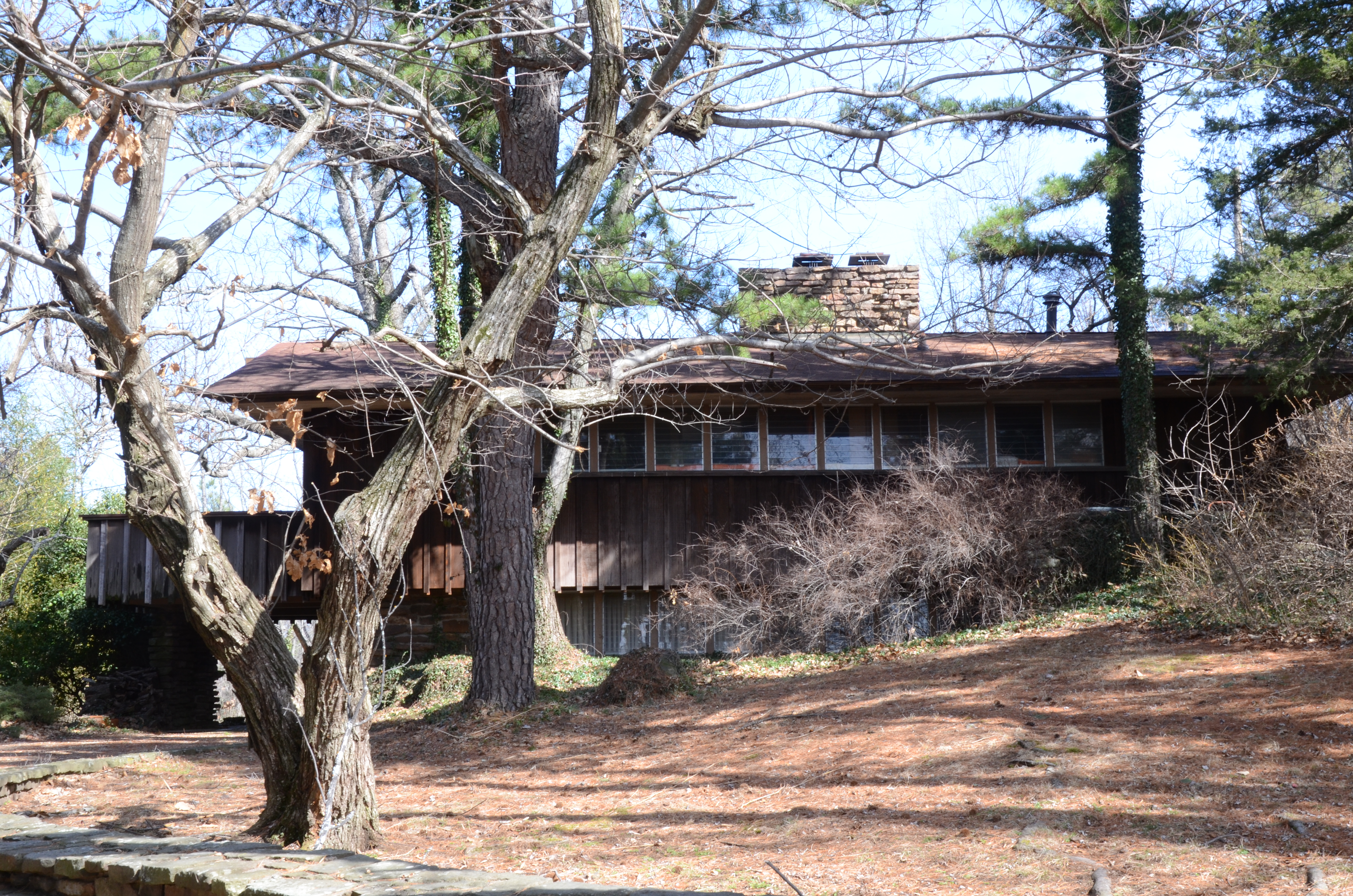

- Location within Arkansas Location within the United States
- Location: 1330 N. Hillcrest, Fayetteville, Arkansas
- Coordinates: 36°4′51″N 94°9′10″W
- Area: less than one acre
- Built: 1956
- Architect: E. Fay Jones
- Architectural style: Moderne, Wrightian
- MPS: Arkansas Designs of E. Fay Jones MPS AD
- NRHP reference No.: 97000453
- Added to NRHP: April 28, 2000

The E. Fay and Gus Jones House is a historic house at 1330 North Hillcrest in Fayetteville, Arkansas. It is a two-story structure, fieldstone on the first level and sheathed in redwood board-and-batten siding on the second, with a broad gabled roof. The house was designed by the architect E. Fay Jones as his family residence, and was completed in 1956. It was the first Jones design to be built, and demonstrated the principles of organic architecture that Jones would espouse through his career. Jones' mentor Frank Lloyd Wright spoke approvingly of the house after visiting it in 1958.

The house was listed on the National Register of Historic Places in 2000.

The house has been recently restored and is now open for limited public tours. The restoration project is a collaboration between the Fay Jones School of Architecture and Design and the Tesseract Center for Immersive Environments and Game Design at the University of Arkansas.

== See also ==
- National Register of Historic Places listings in Washington County, Arkansas
