= Abel Jones House =

Historic house in Maine, United States

- U.S. National Register of Historic Places
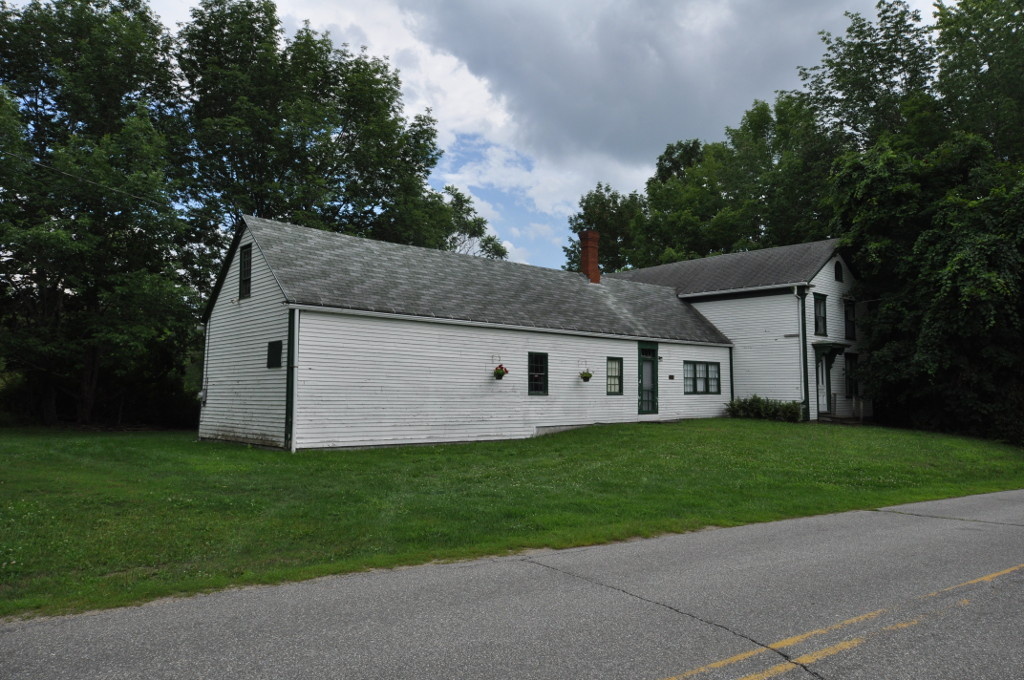

- Location within Maine Location within the United States
- Location: 33 Jones Rd., China, Maine
- Coordinates: 44°23′53″N 69°34′13″W
- Area: 0.3 acres (0.12 ha)
- Built: 1815
- Architectural style: Federal
- MPS: Rufus Jones TR
- NRHP reference No.: 83000456
- Added to NRHP: August 4, 1983

The Abel Jones House is a historic house at 33 Jones Road in the village of South China, Maine. Built in 1815, it is a fine local example of Federal period architecture, which is most notable as the birthplace and childhood home of the important Quaker writer and historian Rufus Jones. The house was listed on the National Register of Historic Places in 1983; it is one of several properties in South China to be listed for their association with Jones.

== Description and history ==
The Abel Jones House stands on the east side of Jones Road, a short way north of the South China Public Library. It is a 2 1/2-story wood-frame structure, with a side-gable roof. It is oriented with its original main facade facing south (presenting a side to the road), with a long single-story ell extending along the road to its rear. Its interior, originally a center hall plan, was reoriented in the mid-19th century toward the road: the entrance was relocated to the street-facing facade (now sheltered by an Italianate hood), and its central hall was converted into a bedroom. The interior retains some of its original Federal period features, including pumpkin pine flooring and fireplace mantels (although one is a replica of a destroyed original).

The house was built in 1815 by Abel Jones, a member of a prominent local Quaker family, and the grandfather of Rufus Jones. Rufus Jones was born and raised here, leaving in 1879 to attend school in Providence, Rhode Island. He returned frequently to stay here during his productive career as a historian, writer, speaker, and theologian.

== See also ==
- National Register of Historic Places listings in Kennebec County, Maine
