= Robert O. Jones House =

Historic house in Wisconsin, United States

- U.S. National Register of Historic Places
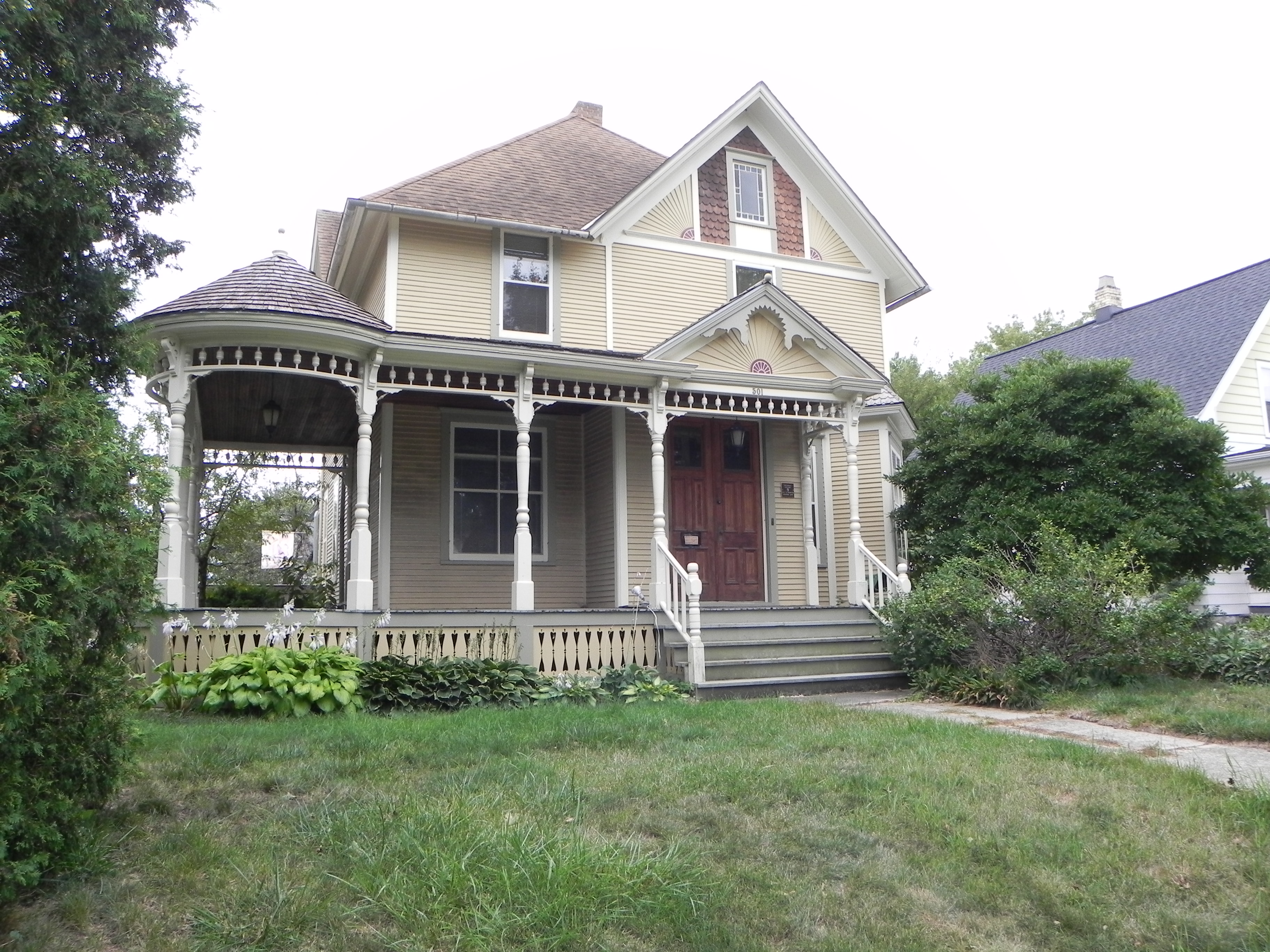
- Robert O. Jones House
- Location: 501 W. College Ave., Waukesha, Wisconsin
- Coordinates: 43°00′09″N 88°14′13″W
- Area: less than one acre
- Built: 1897
- Architect: Wolfe & Waegli
- MPS: Waukesha MRA
- NRHP reference No.: 83004342
- Added to NRHP: October 28, 1983

The Robert O. Jones House is a Queen Anne-styled house built in 1897 in Waukesha, Wisconsin. It was listed on the National Register of Historic Places in 1983 and on the State Register of Historic Places in 1989.

Robert Jones was a postal clerk in Waukesha. The architects Wolf and Waegli designed this house for him and it was built in 1897. It is two stories, with Queen Anne styling in the asymmetric facade, the hip-and-gable roof, the shingle-work in the gable ends, and the wraparound porch. The porch is especially striking, with its sunburst gable and the corner pavilion.
