= Crabtree Jones House =

Historic house in North Carolina, United States

- Nathaniel Jones Jr. House
- U.S. National Register of Historic Places
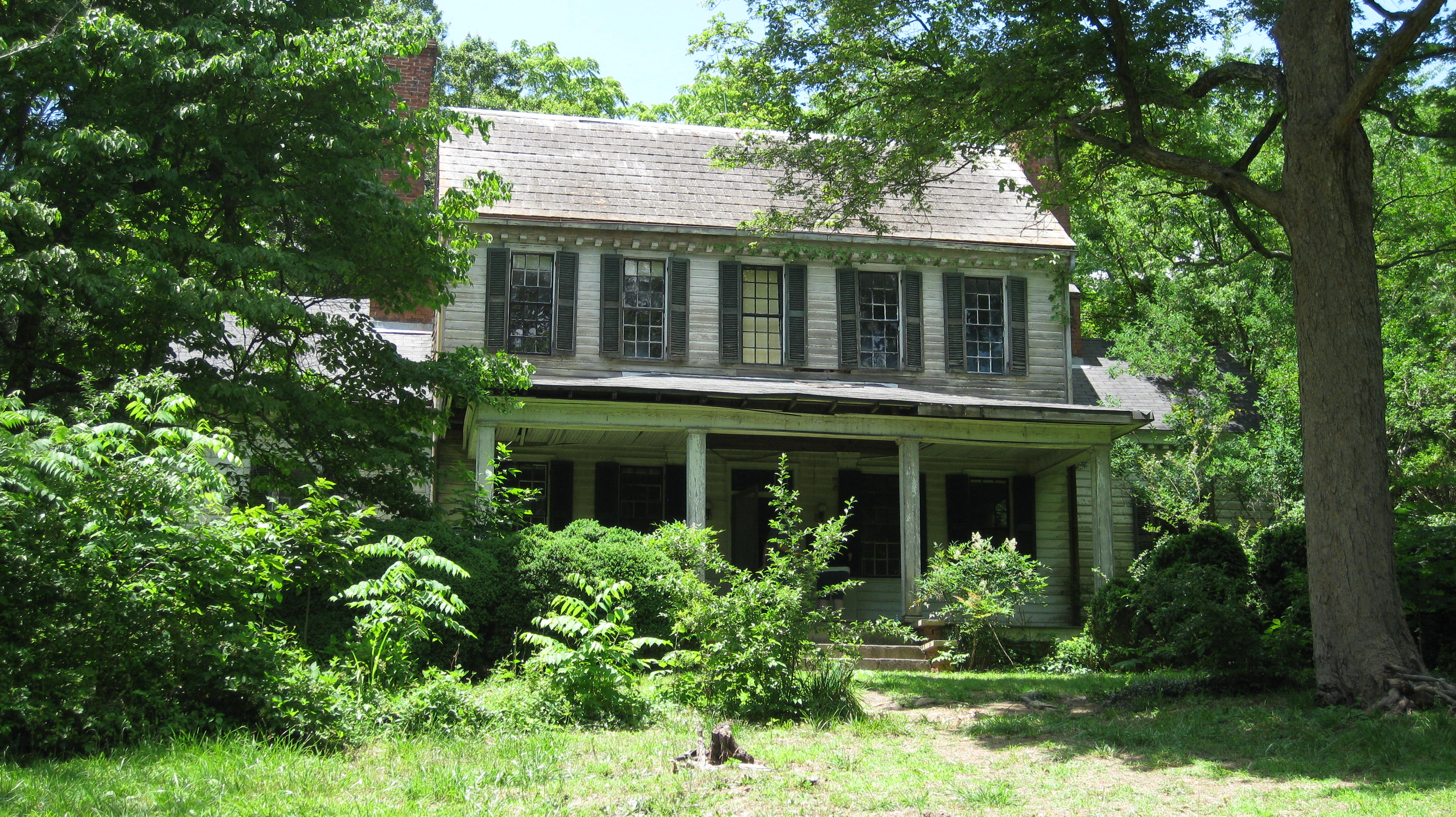
- The Jones House before its move, 2013

- Location within North Carolina Location within the United States
- Location: 3108 Hillmer Drive, Raleigh, North Carolina
- Coordinates: 35°49′20″N 78°37′26″W
- Area: 5 acres (2.0 ha)
- Built: 1795
- Architectural style: Federal, Georgian
- NRHP reference No.: 73001376
- Added to NRHP: June 4, 1973

The Crabtree Jones House, also known historically as the Nathaniel Jones Jr. House, is a residence at 3108 Hillmer Drive in Raleigh, North Carolina. Constructed around 1808-1811 (by dendrochronological dating in 2014) by Nathaniel Jones, it is one of the few remaining large scale plantation homes in Wake County, and one of the oldest private residences in Raleigh. The home has received several additions since its initial construction, but is mainly known for its Federal-style front. Owned by the Jones family for more than 150 years, the house has fallen into disrepair in more recent decades. Following the purchase of the land the house sat upon by developers in 2012, Preservation North Carolina acquired the house and had it moved to a nearby residential neighborhood, where it sits today. The Crabtree Jones house was greatly influenced by the historical events it stood through while in turn influencing the way the Raleigh community developed around it, through both its people and through its land.

== History ==
=== 18th century ===
The land on which the Crabtree Jones house sat has been owned by the Jones family for over two hundred years. The family first acquired a parcel of land through a 1740s land grant by the Earl of Granville to Francis Jones. A Jones house was supposedly built close to Crabtree Creek, but is thought to have been destroyed by the floods that frequent the creek's watershed. This necessitated the creation of a home further away from the Creek, and the Crabtree Jones house is that home. In order to counter the threat of flooding, the house sat upon one of the larger and steeper hills in the area, around 40 ft higher than the surrounding landscape and over 100 ft above the creek, overlooking Crabtree creek from about 900 yards away. On its completion around 1808, the house was one of only a few buildings in the vicinity of the newly formed city of Raleigh, which was formed in 1792. The home was built by early Raleigh resident Nathaniel Jones, a planter and politician. Jones was heavily involved in the local political system, serving at one time or another as county sheriff, state congressman, and one of the original Raleigh landowners, purchasing lot number 201. Nathaniel Jones eventually became known as Crabtree Jones, supposedly in order to differentiate him from his father, Nathaniel Jones Sr., who lived in the region. The former's nickname reflects the landscape in which his house was built.

=== Antebellum ===
Crabtree Jones passed the house on to his son, Kimbrough Jones, along with a large estate. Kimbrough was able to significantly expand this inheritance. The 1850 census records that the Jones family's property was worth $18,619; at the 1860 census its value was given as $50,000. It is likely that the estate's main crop in the antebellum period was tobacco. Like his father, Kimbrough was involved in state politics, serving several terms in the North Carolina general assembly. At the start of the American Civil War Kimbrough was an old man, having been 76 by the time of the 1860 census. The Jones's land was used by both sides during the war, and Camp Crabtree, one of a few large Confederate training camps around Raleigh, was located there. The house appears to have been badly affected by the presence of Sherman's troops, who destroyed or stole most of the furniture and personal property within the house. Kimbrough wrote in 1865 that, "I cannot describe nor you imagine the utter destruction of everything in the house and out of doors; everything in the house except the beds, bureaus, wardrobes and a few chairs is destroyed". In 1866, a year after the war's end, Kimbrough Jones died, leaving the house to his son, Kimbrough Jones Jr.

=== Postbellum ===
Throughout the latter half of the 19th century and the first half of the 20th century, the family continued to be an active part of the community. Although it does not appear anyone from the family served in World War I, a few of the sons of Kimbrough joined soon afterwards in order to receive money for their college education. Through multiple correspondences between their mother, Mrs. Mary Kimbrough Jones, and various sources it becomes apparent that the sons did not enjoy the army life and that the Jones family had political connections. One of the US senators of North Carolina at the time and State Treasurer both sent letters to the army on behalf of the Jones family requesting that Peter Jones, one of the Jones sons, be discharged to help at the farm. One of Kimbrough Jr.'s sons, BK Jones, attended NC A&M (now NC State University); the Jones family children attended Millbrook High School in the 1930s. The house continued to be an active farm for the first half of the twentieth century. Its cash crop was cotton, but the Jones' lands appear to have produced many crops. The Crabtree Jones House was even featured on the cover of a 1934 issue of The Progressive Farmer. Religion also seems to be an important part of the Jones life. Kimbrough Jones Sr. wrote in a letter from 1848 from Hyde County that the worst thing about the place was, "that there is little religion here." In the 20th century the family was involved with Millbrook United Methodist Church. The house and surrounding grounds continued to be owned by the Jones family until being sold to a developer in 1973.

=== Decline ===
By the latter half of the 20th century, the Crabtree Jones house had fallen into disrepair. As the area surrounding the house and its now only 30-acre property began to be developed, the first efforts to save the home were made. In 1969 the house was designated a historic site by the city of Raleigh, and in 1973 it was placed in the National Register of Historic Places. (The house was originally listed under the name "Crabtree Jones House"; this was altered in 2016 to "Nathaniel Jones Jr. House".) With the support of the Raleigh Historic Sites commission, the new owner of the house, Charles Gaddy, promised to preserve the house and prevent its demolition, thus preserving the house for the short term. This did not, however, guarantee its restoration, something it was in dire need of.

As the home continued to fall into disrepair several nonprofits attempted to purchase the Crabtree Jones house, but to no avail. As early as 1974 the Junior League was considering putting money into the house as part of a greater bicentennial project; the cost of restoration at that time was estimated at $40,000 to $45,000. By the 1990s much of the surrounding land had been bought up by developers, so that by the early 2000s only the house and a one-acre tract of land of the former Jones estate remained. The current estimated restoration cost is at $500,000.

== Architecture ==
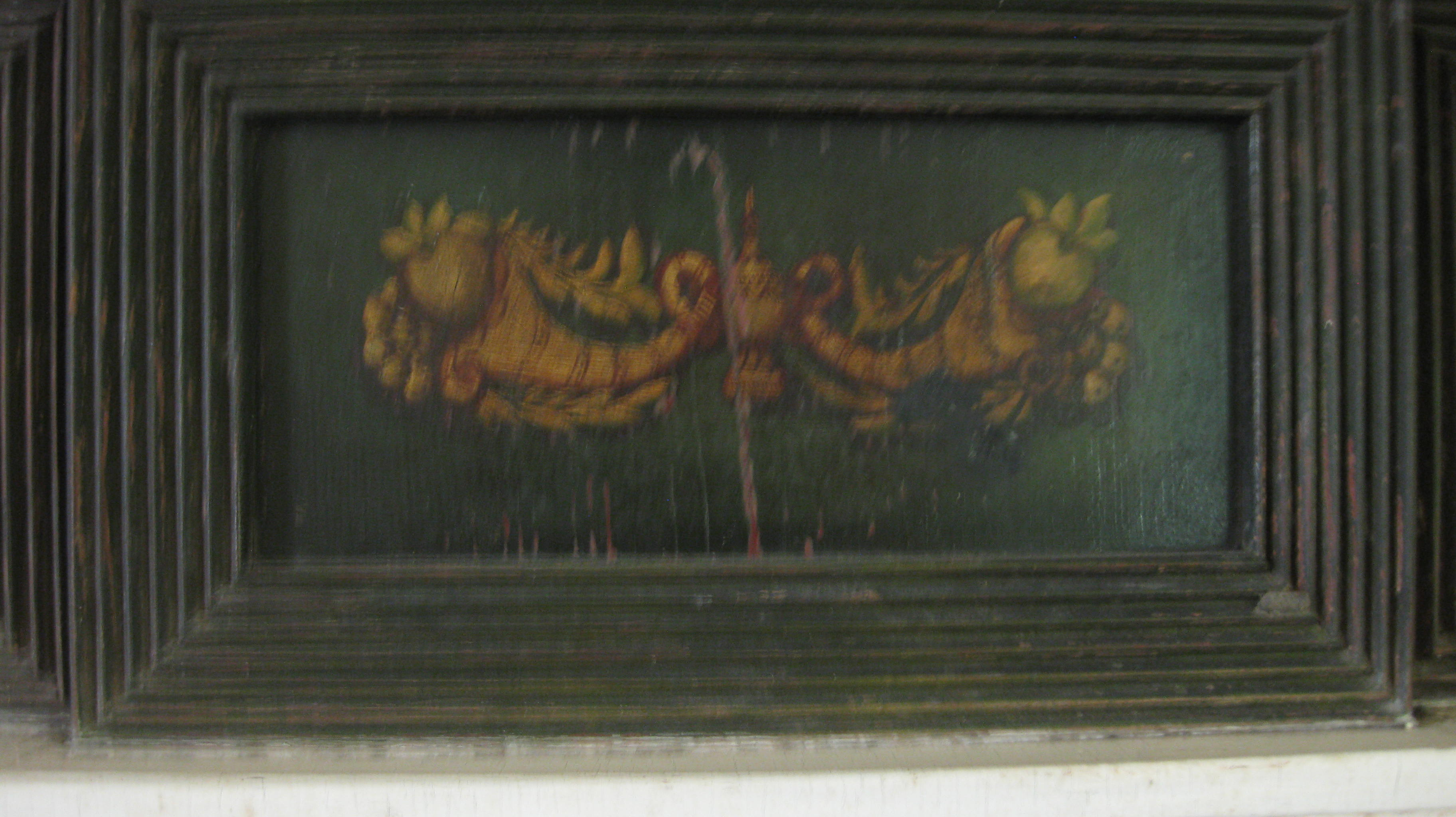
An example of the painted motifs that decorate many of the mantels in the Crabtree Jones House, this one is located on the mantel in the main dining room.

The Crabtree Jones House's architectural history is as significant as the history of those who lived in it. Dendrochronology performed in 2014 dated the front of the house to 1808-09 and the stairwell to 1811. The floor beams of all sections of the house are made with wood, and are in varying states of decay due to centuries of termite damage. The house's main section is exemplary of early Federal architecture. This part of the Crabtree Jones House consists of a central two story section that is 5 bays wide and flanked by two one story extensions on either end, both one bay wide. The interior is laid out in a traditional hall and parlor house floor plan, with the front door, a single 6 paneled wood one, opening into the main dining room. However, the original set of stairs leading up to the second floor had been removed some time since the construction of the additions, so that the main stairwell is now housed in the hallway of the first addition. Although the house is thought to originally have no porch, its front has been graced by them during different periods in time, including a highly decorated Italianate one thought to have been put in around the mid-19th century and a plainer one believed to be put in around the early 20th century. For the 2014 relocation this second porch was removed.

The house features two additions, one believed to have been constructed in the early 19th century and the second around the middle of that century. These feature some unique architectural elements as well, such as Greek Revival moldings and an enclosed second story slanted porch. The house contains three brick chimneys, one in the back extension and two in the main section. The mantels in the front of the house are unique in the fact that they are ornately painted with pastoral scenes and motifs. Hinges on doors are of the traditional H and L bolt fashion. Screen doors windows were added in several places starting in 1925. The house itself is covered by wood weatherboards on both the main section and the addition, and the exterior is currently painted white.

Before its removal the Crabtree Jones house contained a large English basement. Once Preservation North Carolina was able to examine the house in detail it was found that the basement had been used as a family trash dump for several generations. Numerous artifacts were uncovered, including broken glass, pottery, etc. All of what could be was removed for safekeeping and the English Basement demolished in order to make way for the oncoming apartments. Archeological digs were also conducted at the site the house was moved to, but those uncovered nothing of significance.

== Move ==
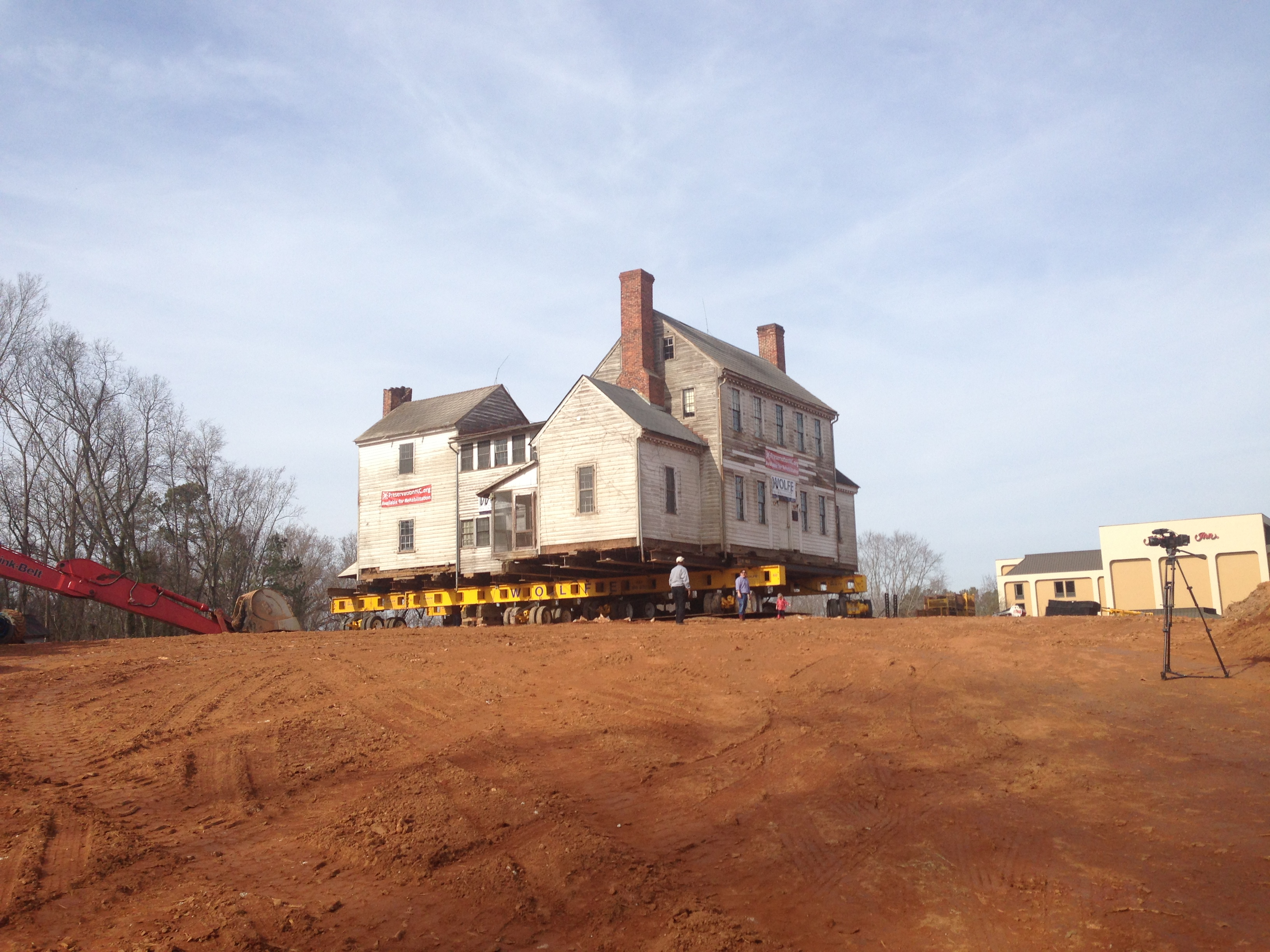
The Crabtree Jones House about to be moved

In 2005, Charles Gaddy died, and the land transferred to another development group in 2009. The Crabtree Jones House was scheduled for demolition in 2012. The property, including that on which the house sat, are to be turned into a set of apartment buildings similar to those that have been built recently in other sections of the city. Much of the forest that had covered the remaining one acre property was removed. Fortunately, the nonprofit Preservation North Carolina, with the cooperation of the developer and the local community, was able to move the house off its hill to a nearby 1960s suburban neighborhood that also houses the Jones family cemetery. A key challenge concerning the move was just how exactly the 200-ton house would be transported down a hill of such a steep grade. This was accomplished via the use of computer-controlled hydraulic pumps that kept the house level during its transfer. The move itself had a budget of $632,000, which included placing the house on the steel moving array, transportation, and the purchase and demolition of the existing 1960s ranch home on whose site the Crabtree Jones house was to be placed. The house successfully completed its move on February 4, 2014.

== Effect on community ==
In April 2014 the Crabtree Jones House was still garnering media interest, particularly in the news. To some extent it had reopened a debate over the preservation of historic buildings, particularly in downtown Raleigh's Historic Oakwood District. This section of town offers a wide variety of housing styles and ages, ranging from 19th century Victorian to 1920s bungalows. However, in recent decades the neighborhood has strongly opposed constructing any new houses in the area or adding additions onto any of the existing houses. One example that has gained notoriety in recent months is the construction of a particular home in the district that strongly features modernist design. While some neighbors have supported the construction, many others have condemned it, and the opposing sides have taken their debate all the way to the county superior courts. The Crabtree Jones House has been used as an arguing point for the side supporting the approval of the modernist house. One of the many reasons the house was preserved is because of its significant variety of architectural styles. Throughout the 19th century the house went through varying degrees of renovation so that it now showcases many different architectural styles. Those groups who support the construction of the modernist house in the Oakwood neighborhood, such as Preservation North Carolina (the nonprofit largely responsible for preventing the destruction of the Crabtree Jones House), argue that such a diversity of architecture will, in the long run, add to the historical uniqueness of Oakwood. Issues with modern construction in the neighborhood have usually been dealt with quickly in the past and in favor of those who wish the neighborhood to remain unchanged; the relocation of the Crabtree Jones House and its prevalence in the news can be labeled as partially to blame for the prolonged argument.

The preservation of the Crabtree Jones House has also acted as community unifying event, and has brought historic preservation back into the limelight. Its unique architectural features have inspired new debate in the field of historic preservation and the construction of modern houses in historic neighborhoods. The house itself has been affected by nearly every event that effected the state since its creation. Through the contributions of the Jones family to the local community through service and economics the house has helped to shape the local landscape. In these ways it has served as an important part of public history for the Raleigh area.
