= Alpheus Jones House =

Historic house in North Carolina, United States

- U.S. National Register of Historic Places
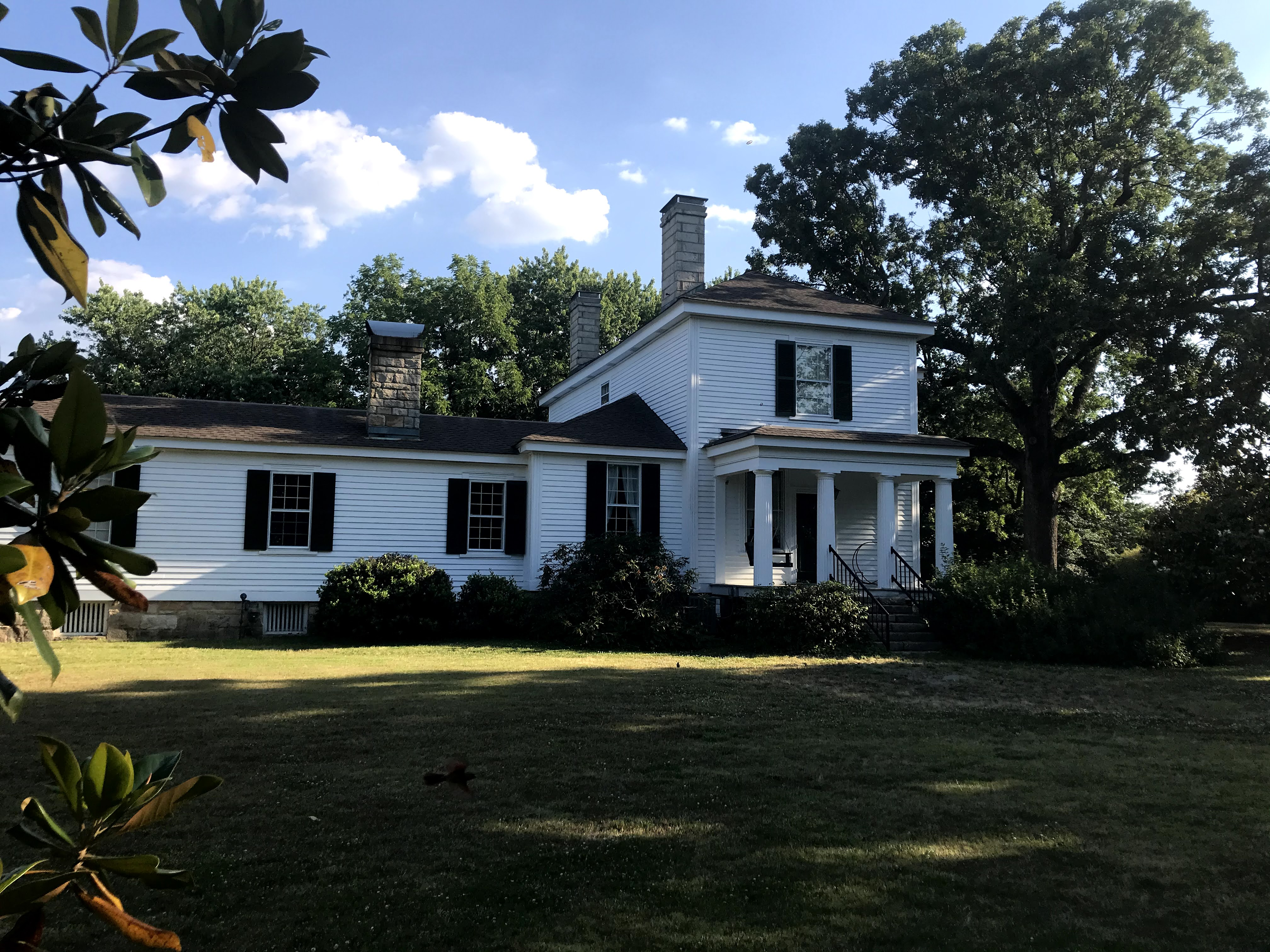

- Location within North Carolina Location within the United States
- Location: Northeast of Raleigh on US 401, near Raleigh, North Carolina
- Coordinates: 35°51′50″N 78°32′50″W
- Area: 3 acres (1.2 ha)
- Built: 1847
- Architectural style: Greek Revival
- NRHP reference No.: 75001295
- Added to NRHP: July 7, 1975

Alpheus Jones House, also known as Seth Jones 1847 Restaurant, is a historic home located near Raleigh, Wake County, North Carolina. It was built in 1847, and is a two-story, rectangular, vernacular Greek Revival-style frame dwelling with a hipped roof. It is sheathed in weatherboard, sits on an ashlar foundation, and has a rear extension and kitchen wing. The front facade features a reconstructed two-story double Doric order portico. The house was restored in 1968, and renovated to house a restaurant.

It was listed on the National Register of Historic Places in 1975.
