= Enoch H. Jones House =

Historic house in Tennessee, United States

- U.S. National Register of Historic Places
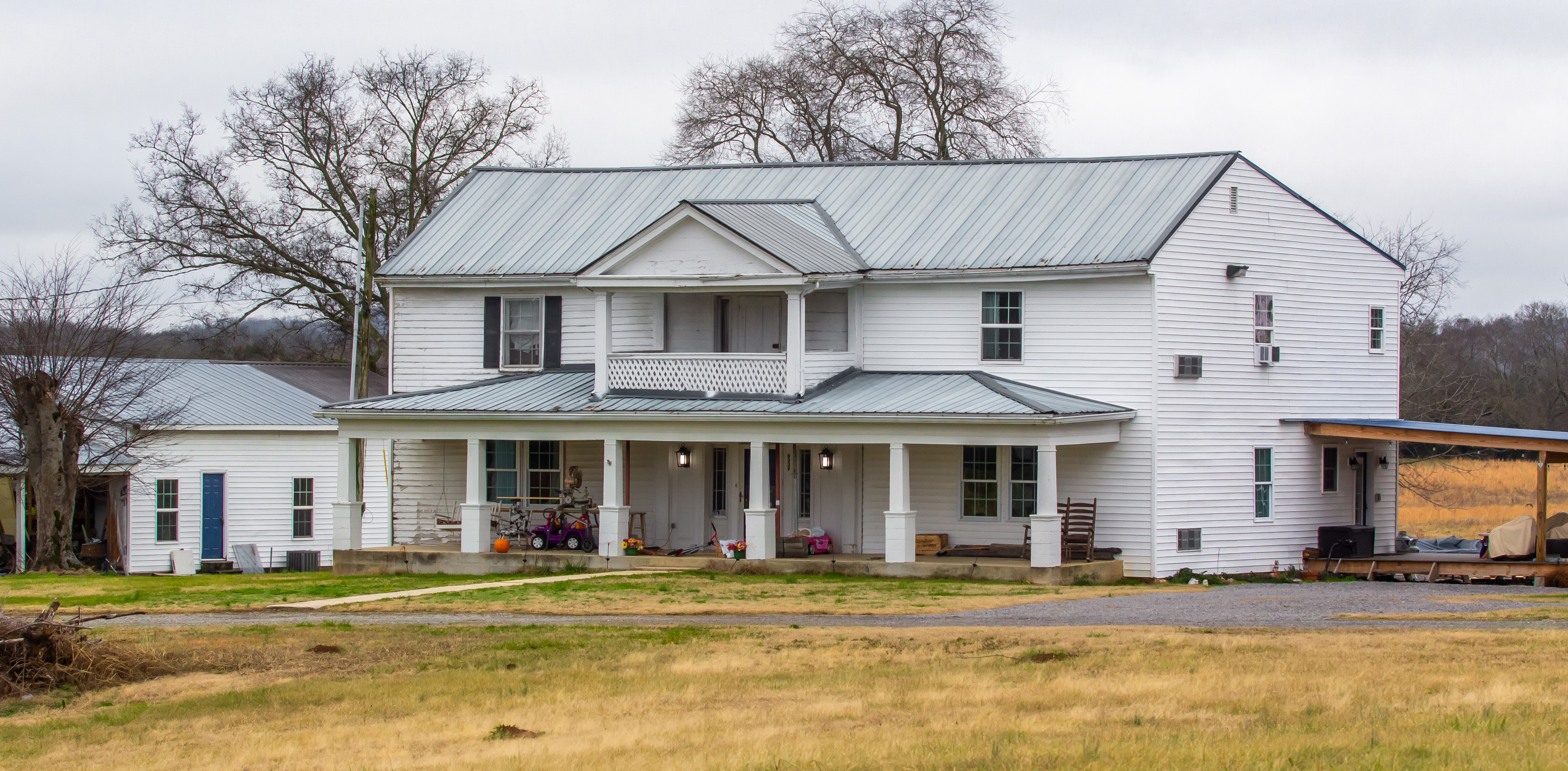

- Location within Tennessee Location within the United States
- Nearest city: Murfreesboro, Tennessee
- Coordinates: 35°51′39″N 86°13′04″W
- Area: 4.3 acres (1.7 ha)
- Built: 1796
- Architectural style: I-house
- NRHP reference No.: 95001043
- Added to NRHP: August 25, 1995

The Enoch H. Jones House, also known as the Harvey House, is a historic house in Murfreesboro, Tennessee, U.S.. It was built as a log cabin in 1796 for Ezra Jones, his wife Margaret Hunt and their six children. Their son Enoch served in the War of 1812 and married Eunice Macklin, with whom he had six children. He owned 14 slaves by 1840, and he was active in the Whig Party. By 1850, he redesigned the cabin as an I-house with a portico in the Greek Revival architectural style. The house has been listed on the National Register of Historic Places since August 25, 1995.
