= Gov. Thomas G. Jones House =

Historic house in Alabama, United States

- U.S. National Register of Historic Places
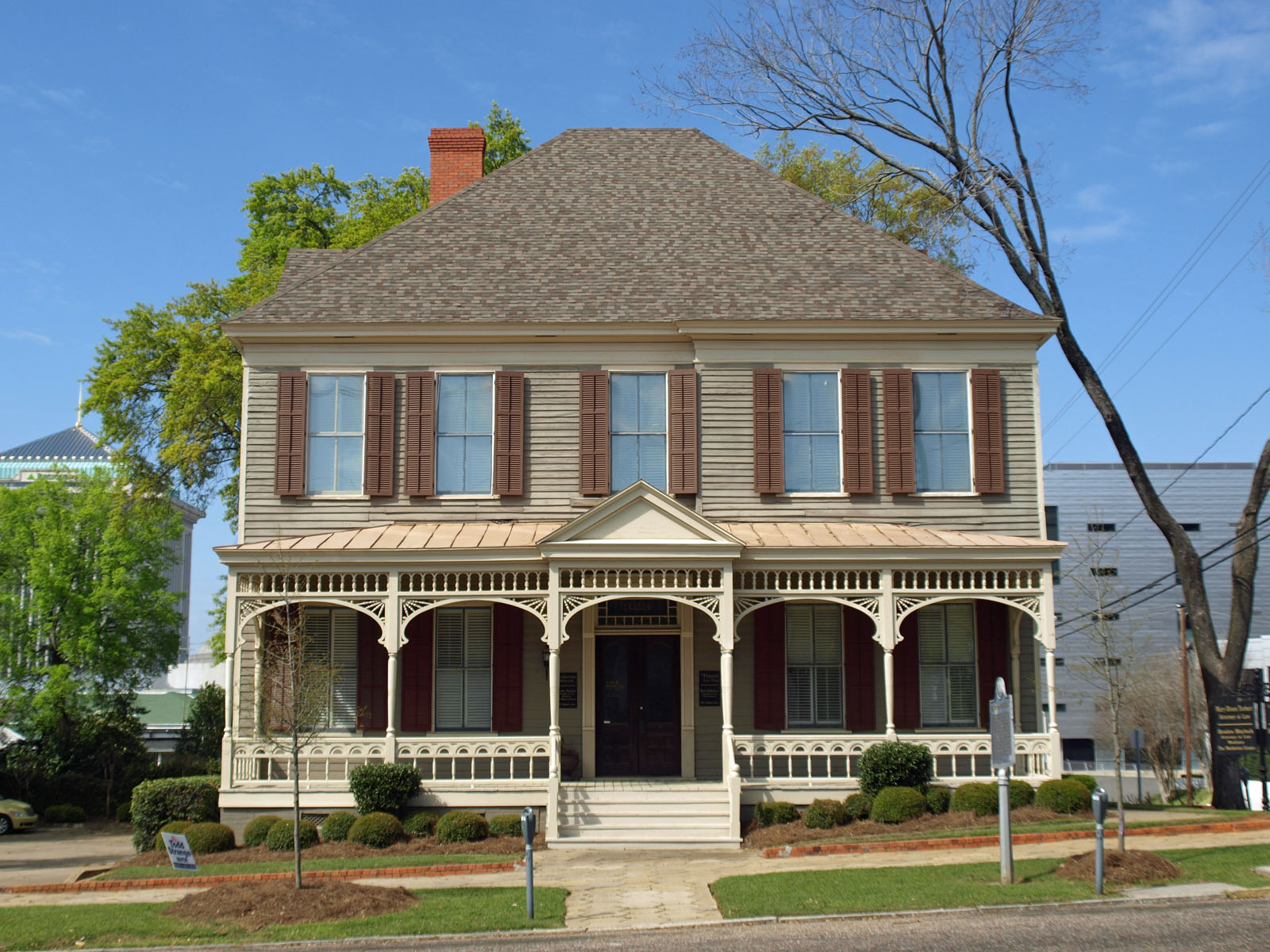
- The house in 2009

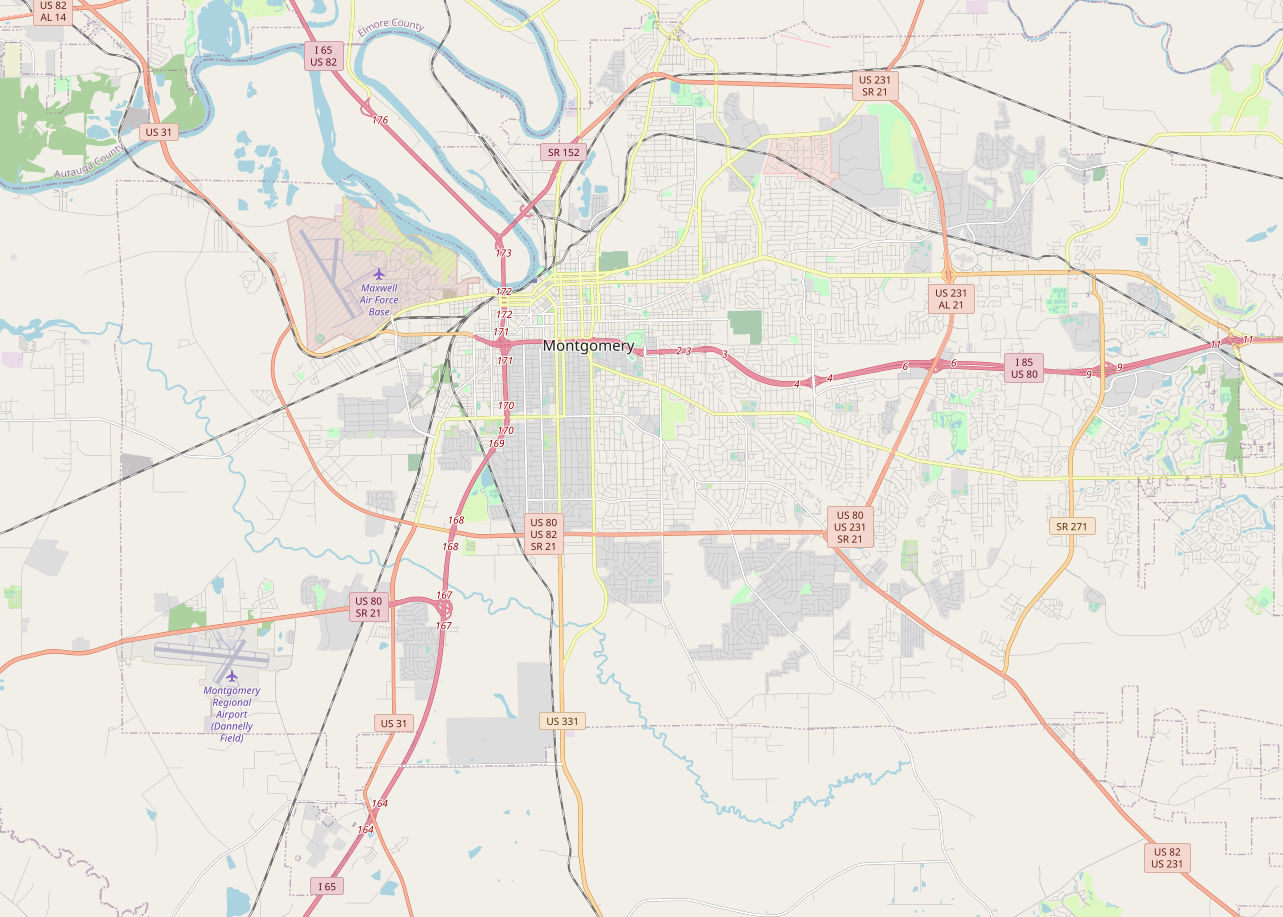
- Location within Montgomery, Alabama Location within Alabama Location within the United States
- Location: 323 Adams Ave., Montgomery, Alabama
- Coordinates: 32°22′32″N 86°18′14″W
- Area: less than one acre
- Built: 1855
- Architectural style: Victorian
- NRHP reference No.: 78000506
- Added to NRHP: December 8, 1978

The Governor Thomas G. Jones House is a historic Victorian-style house in Montgomery, Alabama. The two-story frame building was built in 1855. It is best known as Governor Thomas G. Jones Mansion, Alabama's 28th Governor. It was added to the National Register of Historic Places on December 8, 1978.
