= Tisdale–Jones House =

Historic house in North Carolina, United States

- U.S. National Register of Historic Places
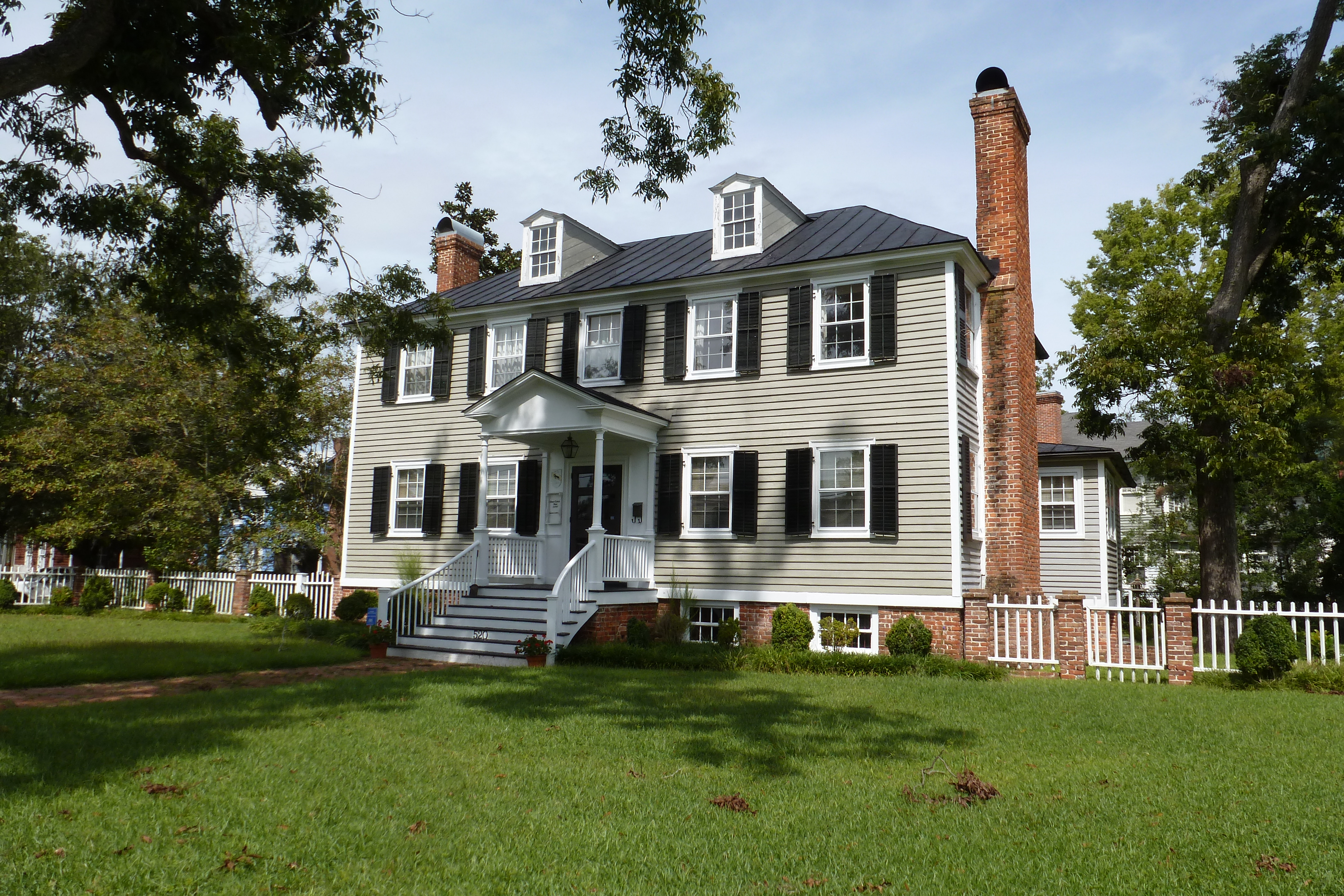
- Tisdale–Jones House, September 2012

- Location within North Carolina Location within the United States
- Location: 520 New St., New Bern, North Carolina
- Coordinates: 35°6′36″N 77°2′33″W
- Area: 0.3 acres (0.12 ha)
- Built: c. 1769
- NRHP reference No.: 72000954
- Added to NRHP: April 25, 1972

Tisdale–Jones House, also known as the New Bern City Schools Administration Building, is a historic home located at New Bern, Craven County, North Carolina. It was built about 1769, and is a 2 1/2-story, central hall plan frame dwelling with a large two-story rear ell. In 1958, the New Bern City Board of Education began using the building as offices; in the 1980s it was returned to private residential use.

It was listed on the National Register of Historic Places in 1972.
