= Jones–Sherman House =

Historic house in Oregon, United States

- Jones-Sherman House
- U.S. National Register of Historic Places
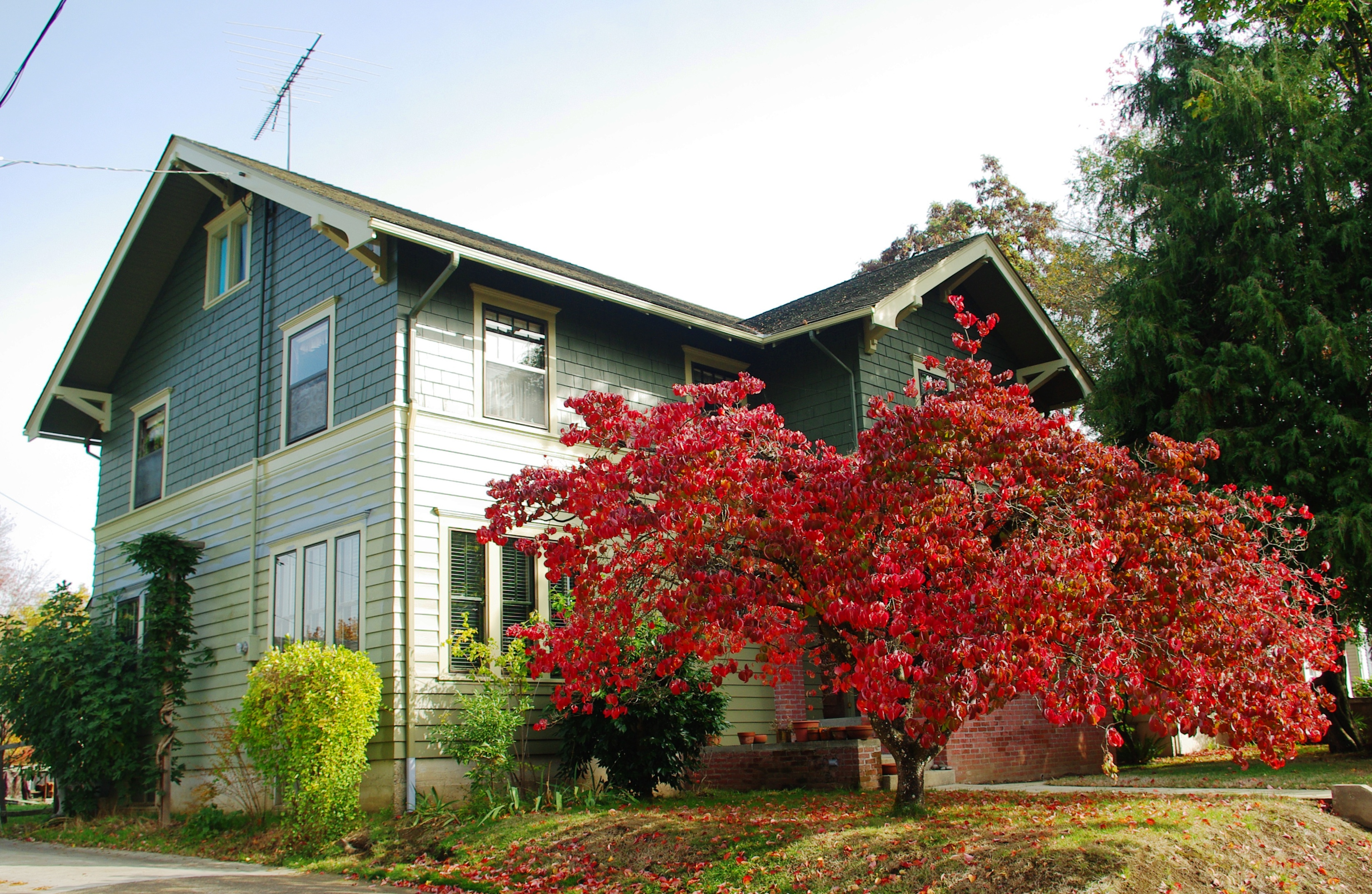

- Location within Oregon Location within the United States
- Location: 835 D St., NE, Salem, Oregon
- Coordinates: 44.94716°N 123.02718°W
- Built: 1913
- Architect: Lindstrom & Almars; Ralph R. Jones
- Architectural style: Bungalow/Craftsman
- NRHP reference No.: 81000508
- Added to NRHP: December 21, 1981

The Jones–Sherman House is a historic Bungalow/Craftsman style house built in 1913 in Salem, Oregon, United States. It was built from a pattern book by Lindstrom & Almars by owner Ralph R. Jones.

The house is also known as the Ralph R. Jones House or Charles L. Sherman House.

It was listed on the National Register of Historic Places in 1981 because of its architectural significance.
