= Thomas Jones House (Beaver, Utah) =

- U.S. National Register of Historic Places
- Location within Utah
- Location: 635 N. 400 West, Beaver, Utah
- Coordinates: 38°16′57″N 112°38′54″W
- Area: less than one acre
- Built: 1873
- Built by: Thomas Frazer
- MPS: Beaver MRA
- NRHP reference No.: 82004091
- Added to NRHP: September 17, 1982

The Thomas Jones House, at 635 N. 400 West in Beaver, Utah, was built in 1873. It was listed on the National Register of Historic Places in 1982.

It is a black rock (basalt) hall and parlor plan house built by Scotland-born stonemason Thomas Frazer.
