= William R. Jones House =

Historic house in Massachusetts, United States

- U.S. National Register of Historic Places
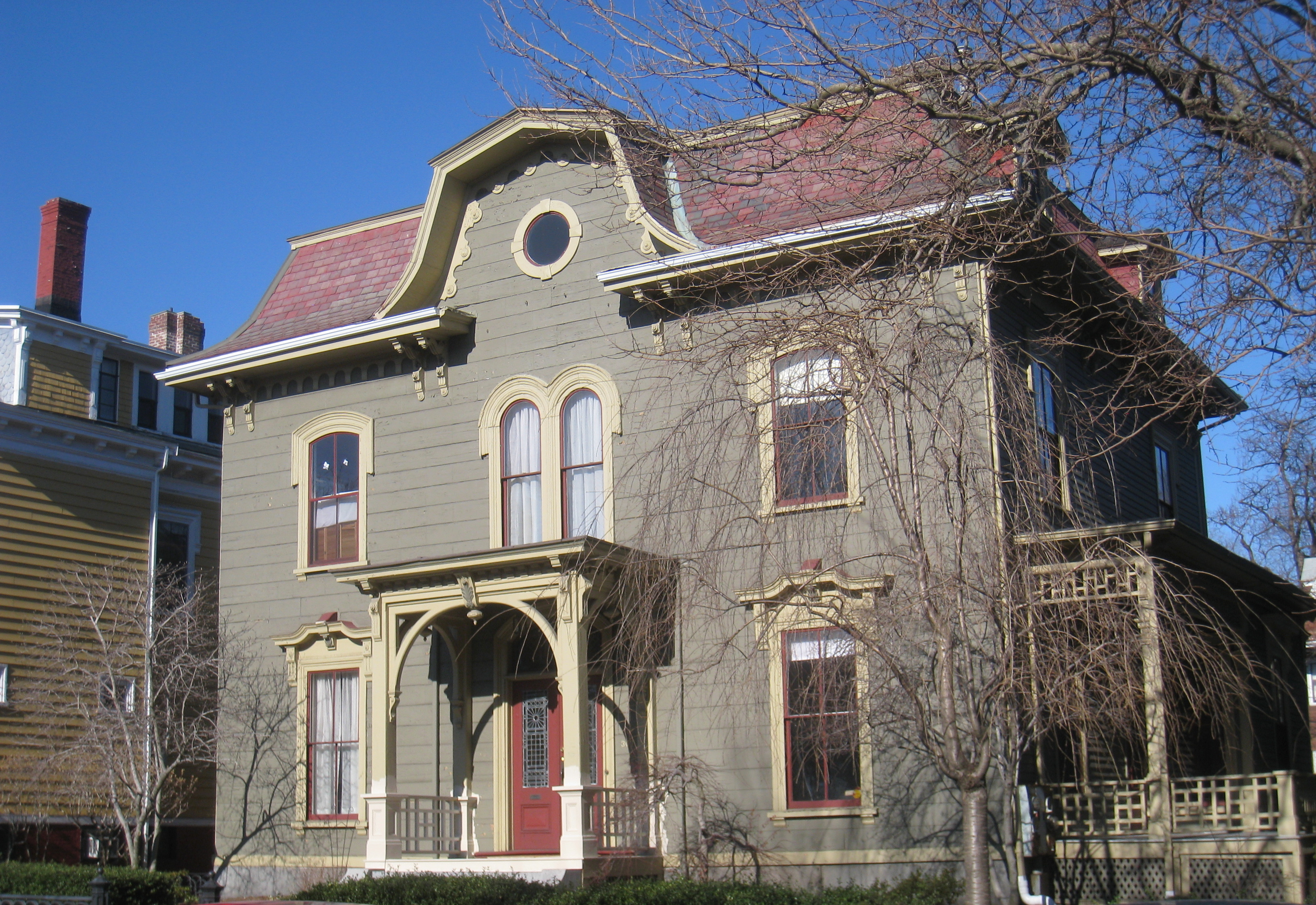

- Location within Massachusetts Location within the United States
- Location: Cambridge, Massachusetts
- Coordinates: 42°22′12.3″N 71°06′22.9″W
- Built: 1865
- Architectural style: Second Empire
- MPS: Cambridge MRA
- NRHP reference No.: 83000813
- Added to NRHP: June 30, 1983

The William R. Jones House is an historic house at 307 Harvard Street in Cambridge, Massachusetts. It is a 2 1/2-story wood-frame house, whose Second Empire styling includes a flared mansard roof and flushboarded siding scored to resemble ashlar stone. It has a rare example in Cambridge of a curvilinear front gable, in which is an oculus window. Its windows are topped by heavy decorative hoods, and the porch features square posts with large decorative brackets. The house was built c. 1865 for William R. Jones, a soap manufacturer, and typifies the houses that were built lining Harvard Street in the 19th century after the Dana estate was subdivided.

The house was listed on the National Register of Historic Places in 1983.

== See also ==
- National Register of Historic Places listings in Cambridge, Massachusetts
