= John Jones House (Stoneham, Massachusetts) =

Historic house in Massachusetts, United States

- U.S. National Register of Historic Places
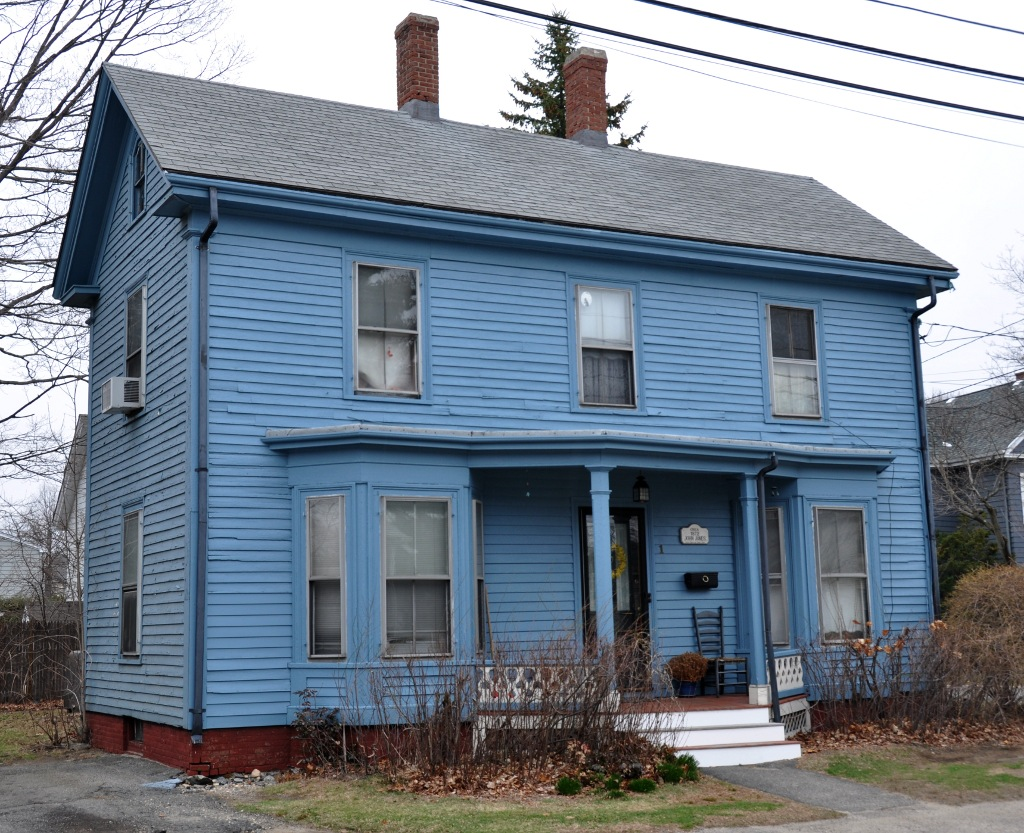

- Location within Massachusetts Location within the United States
- Location: 1 Winthrop St., Stoneham, Massachusetts
- Coordinates: 42°28′32″N 71°6′11″W
- Built: 1874
- Architectural style: Italianate
- MPS: Stoneham MRA
- NRHP reference No.: 84002708
- Added to NRHP: April 13, 1984

The John Jones House is a historic house at 1 Winthrop Street in Stoneham, Massachusetts. Built in 1874, it is a well-preserved example of a house with classic, yet modest, Italianate features. The two-story wood-frame structure is finished in clapboards, with a side-gable roof and twin interior chimneys. It has a three-bay front facade, with bay windows flanking a center entry that is sheltered by a porch connected to the bay roofs. John Jones, the first owner, was a shoemaker.

The house was listed on the National Register of Historic Places in 1984.

== See also ==
- National Register of Historic Places listings in Stoneham, Massachusetts
- National Register of Historic Places listings in Middlesex County, Massachusetts
