= Thomas W. Jones House =

Historic house in Massachusetts, United States

- U.S. National Register of Historic Places
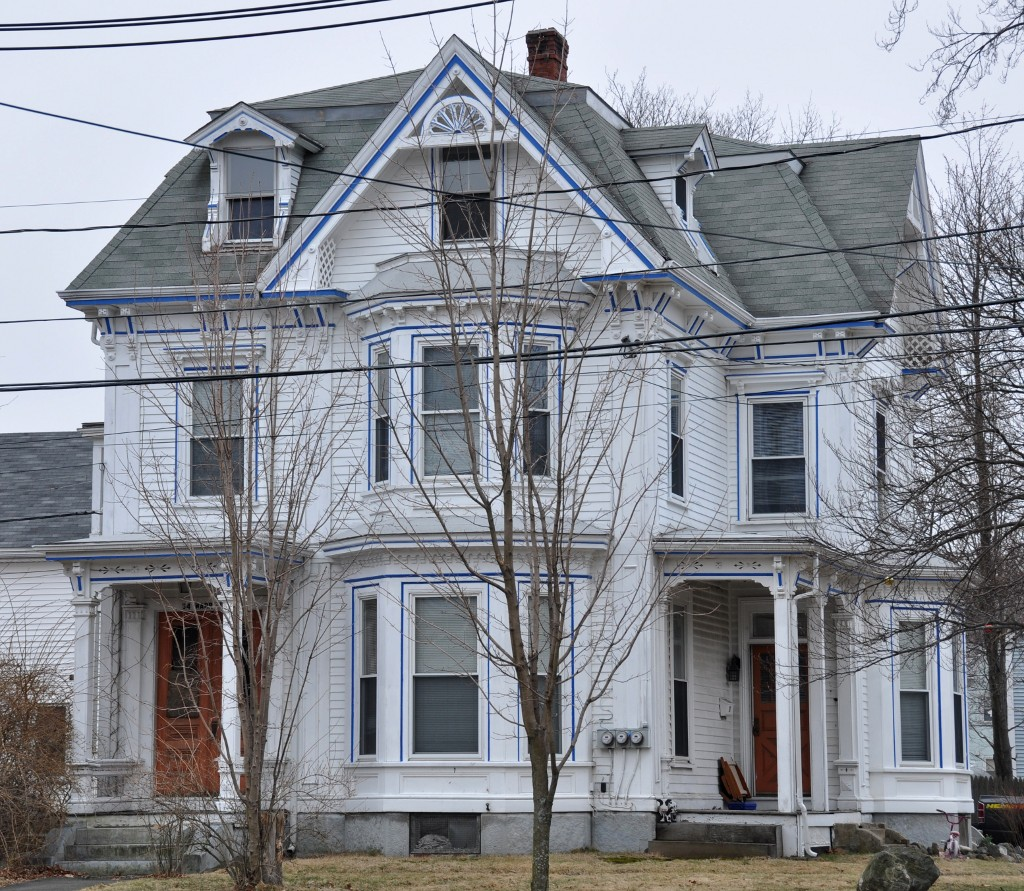

- Location within Massachusetts Location within the United States
- Location: 34 Warren St., Stoneham, Massachusetts
- Coordinates: 42°28′31″N 71°6′9″W
- Built: 1878
- Architect: Spencer, John
- Architectural style: Second Empire
- MPS: Stoneham MRA
- NRHP reference No.: 84002716
- Added to NRHP: April 13, 1984

The Thomas W. Jones House is a historic house at 34 Warren Street in Stoneham, Massachusetts. It is Stoneham's best preserved Second Empire house, preserving significant external details, and its carriage house. The two-story wood-frame house has a T shape, and features a bracketed porch and cornice, gable screens, paneled pilasters, and oriel windows. The house was built for Thomas W. Jones, who built the last major shoe factory in Stoneham.

The house was listed on the National Register of Historic Places in 1984.

== See also ==
- National Register of Historic Places listings in Stoneham, Massachusetts
- National Register of Historic Places listings in Middlesex County, Massachusetts
