= Jones Farm (Kenbridge, Virginia) =

Historic house in Virginia, United States

- U.S. National Register of Historic Places
- Virginia Landmarks Register
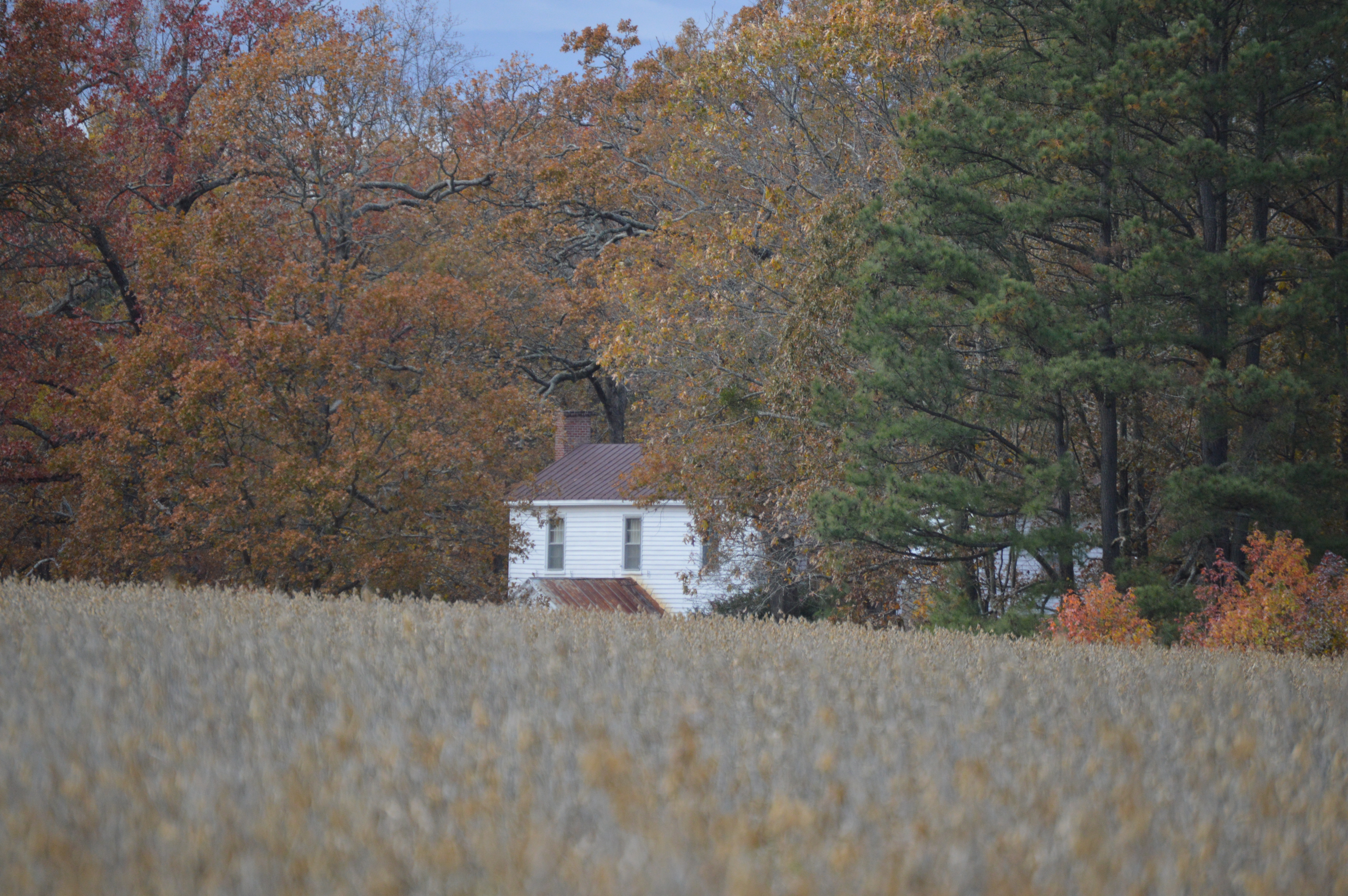
- Distant view from the road

- Location within Virginia Location within the United States
- Location: VA 609, approximately .75 mi. N of jct. with VA 613, near Kenbridge, Virginia
- Coordinates: 36°54′2″N 78°6′44″W
- Area: 359 acres (145 ha)
- Built: c. 1835, c. 1846
- Architectural style: Greek Revival
- NRHP reference No.: 96001052
- VLR No.: 055-0182

Significant dates
- Added to NRHP: September 27, 1996
- Designated VLR: June 19, 1996

The Jones Farm is a historic tobacco plantation house and farm located near Kenbridge, Lunenburg County, Virginia. It was built about 1846, and is a two-story, three-bay, frame I-house with a rear ell dated to about 1835. It is sheathed in original weatherboard and has a side gable roof. It features a front porch with Greek Revival style characteristics. Also on the property are the contributing smokehouse, ice house, granary, storage barn, tobacco storage facility, dairy stable, corncrib, two chicken coops, five tobacco barns, three tenant farmhouses, and the sites of a well house and tool shed.

It was listed on the National Register of Historic Places in 1996.
