= Lewis Jones House (Centerville, Indiana) =

Historic house in Indiana, United States

- U.S. National Register of Historic Places
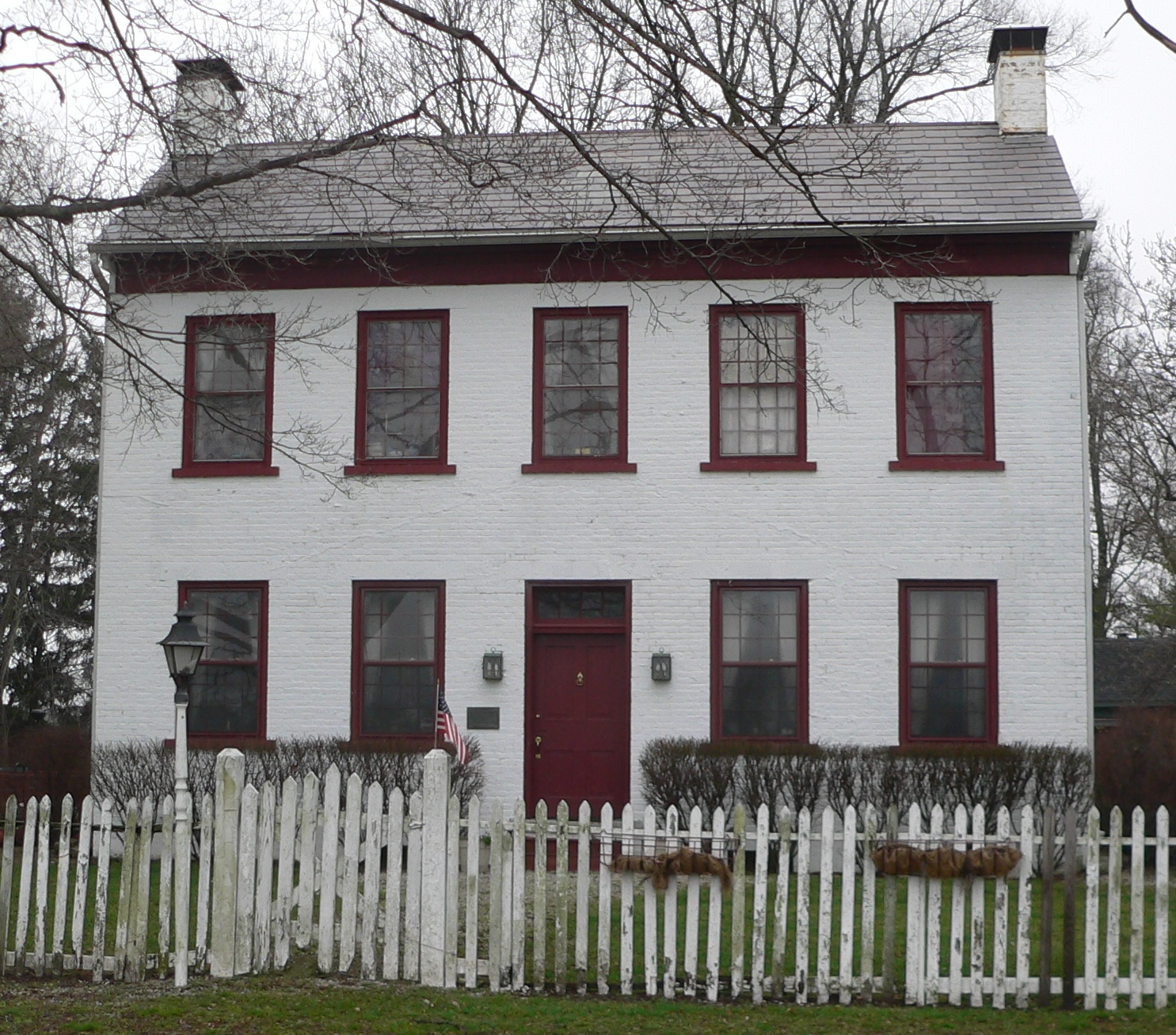
- View from the south, across College Corner Road

- Location within Indiana Location within the United States
- Nearest city: Centerville, Indiana
- Coordinates: 39°49′52″N 84°58′33″W
- Built: 1840
- Architectural style: Federal
- NRHP reference No.: 84001744
- Added to NRHP: June 7, 1984

Lewis Jones House, also known as The Stephen and Betty Jones House, is a historic farmhouse in Centerville, Indiana, United States. It was built in 1840. It was listed on the National Register of Historic Places in 1984.

== Lewis Jones ==
Lewis Jones moved to Center Township, Wayne County, Indiana with his parents in 1814. In April 1822, he traveled from Centerville, to Cincinnati, Ohio, to Indianapolis, Indiana making the first mail delivery from Centerville to the state capital. Jones was a farmer, raising fruit, and was a founding member of the Wayne County Horticultural Society, which preceded the Indiana Horticultural Society by three years. Jones died in 1877. His family is buried in Crown Hill Cemetery in Centerville. After Jones' death, the home was owned by the Dunbar family, who were involved in the early lumber business in Centerville.

== Design ==
Architecturally, the farmhouse is a "good example of an early Center Township farmhouse and of a style that is typical of its time in Wayne County," according to the National Register of Historic Places.

The house is designed in the Federal architecture style. There are three parts to the house: the main part, the gable roof wing, and the story frame. The main part is 2 1/2 stories high with a "common bond brick building with a five-bay facade and a side gable roof." The gable roof wing connects to the main part from the west side. It was originally built as a kitchen. The story frame extends from the east side of the main part. It was built in 1955 and remodeled in 1974–78.

The main entrance to the house is located in the main part, in the middle lower part of the front facade. The main part has the majority of original parts from the 1840 house. It has the original four-panel wood door, a four-light transom, a smooth stone sill plate and a lintel. The windows are double hung and have 12 plates in each section, as well as sills and lintels. It has a chimney on each side of the house. The exterior has a molded cornice and a frieze. The roof is made of slate and it is believed that the roof slate was replaced in 1860. The walls of the main part have a small square attic vent on each side.

The interior of the main part has two rooms on the first floor and two on the second. The rooms on the west side are larger than the rooms on the east side. Each of the four rooms has a fireplace. In the western room on the first floor, cupboards flank the fireplace. In the opposite room is a staircase which ascends into a bedroom above.

== History ==
The house was submitted for consideration for listing on the National Register of Historic Places by Stephen and Betty Jones, the owners of the house, in 1981.
