= David J. and Maggie Jones House =

Historic house in Wisconsin, United States

- U.S. National Register of Historic Places
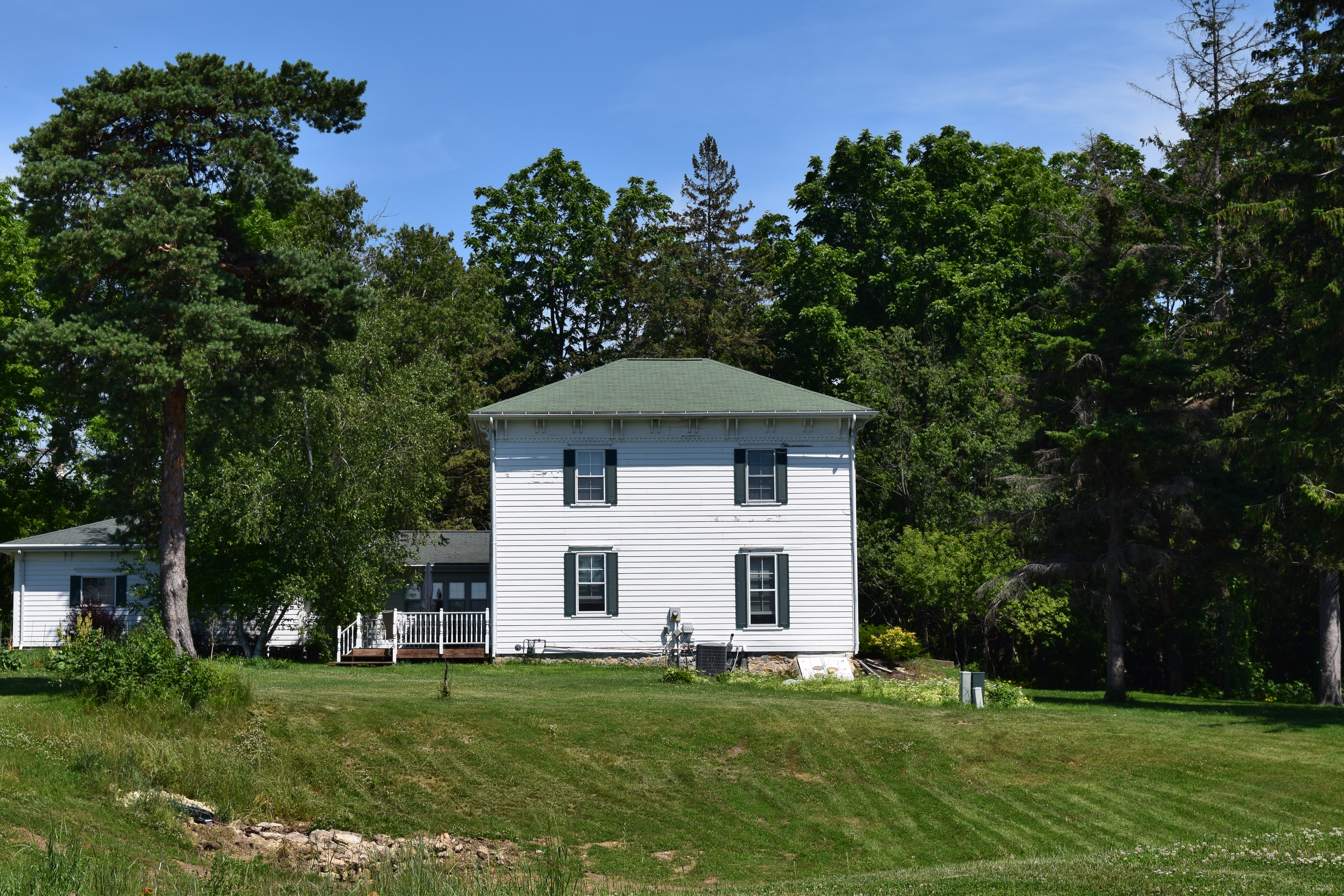
- David J. and Maggie Jones House
- Location: 201 E. Swayne St., Dodgeville, Wisconsin
- Coordinates: 42°58′18″N 90°07′41″W
- Area: less than one acre
- Built: 1878
- Architectural style: Italianate
- NRHP reference No.: 94000447
- Added to NRHP: May 19, 1994

The David J. and Maggie Jones House is located in Dodgeville, Wisconsin.

== History ==
The house was built for J.C. Hocking, a Cornish immigrant, miner and businessman. It was later occupied by David J. Jones, a Welsh immigrant, Civil War veteran, miner, and real estate speculator. The house was added to the State and the National Register of Historic Places in 1994.
