= John H. Jones House =

Historic house in Wisconsin, United States

- U.S. National Register of Historic Places
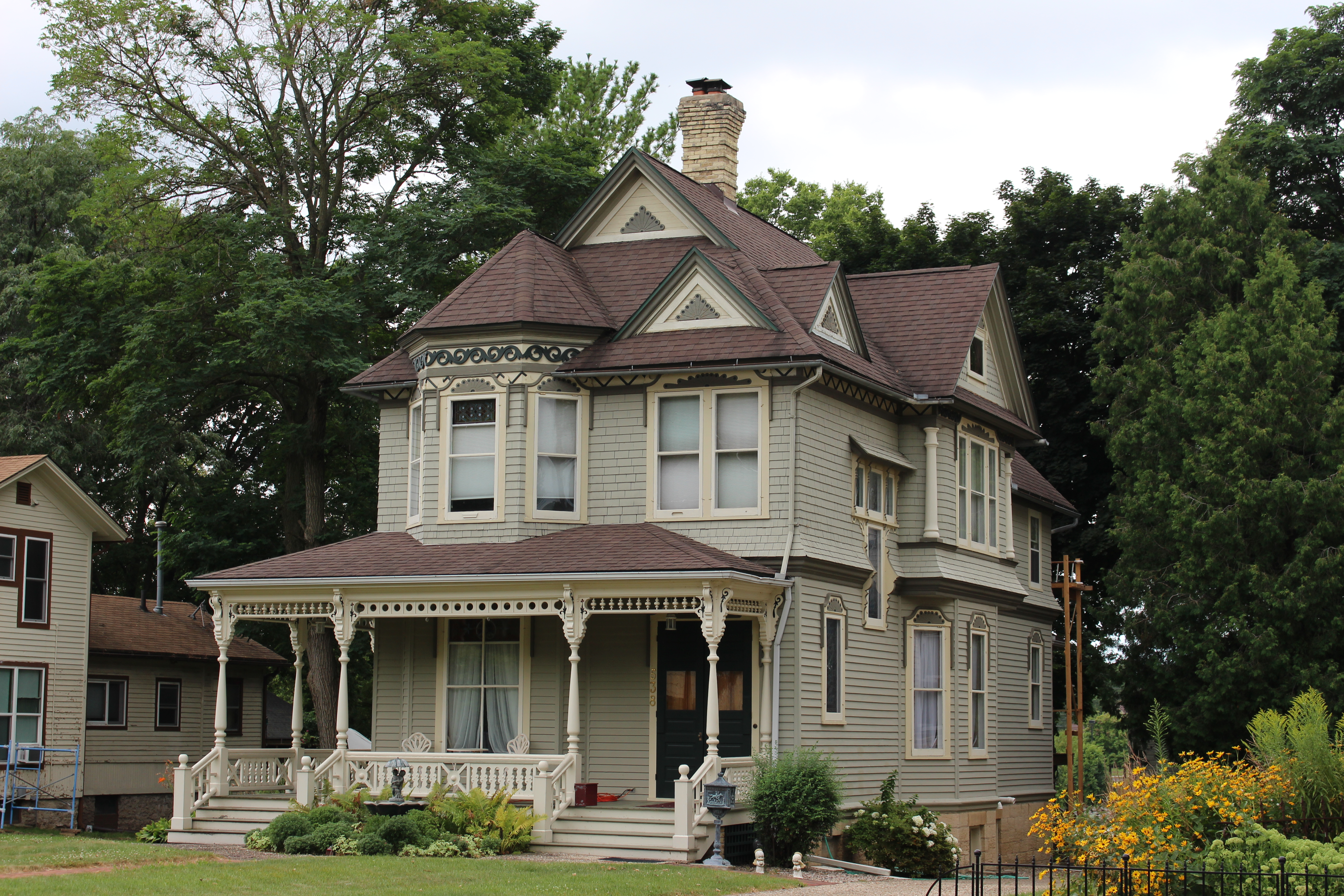
- John H. Jones House

- Location within Wisconsin Location within the United States
- Interactive map showing the location of John H. Jones House
- Location: 538 S. Main St., Janesville, Wisconsin
- Coordinates: 42°40′36″N 89°00′56″W
- Area: less than one acre
- Built: 1890
- Architectural style: Queen Anne
- NRHP reference No.: 08000186
- Added to NRHP: March 14, 2008

The John H. Jones House is a Queen Anne-style house built in Janesville, Wisconsin in 1890, now carefully restored. In 2007 the house was added to the State Register of Historic Places and to the National Register of Historic Places the following year.

In 1835 the first settlers arrived in what would become Janesville, surrounded by some of the most fertile prairies in the state. The settlement grew in those early years on agricultural and later manufacturing industries. By the late 1800s it traded and processed tobacco from the surrounding farms, and the downtown had grown to span both sides of the Rock River.

John H. Jones was a successful merchant who in 1890 built this house near his business downtown. He didn't build this house as large as some of the professionals and industrialist built over in what is now the Courthouse Hill district, but he chose the same Queen Anne style - popular at the time - and his house is still impressive. The house has a complex roofline, a corner tower, an asymmetric wraparound porch, and varied surface textures, in the clapboard first story versus the shingled second. All of these are hallmarks of Queen Anne style. Of interest in this design are the triangular pediments looking out of the gable peaks and the decorated frieze beneath the eaves. Inside the house, walls are plastered, and most first floor rooms have crown moldings and picture rails. Pocket doors connect many first floor rooms and the parlor features a fireplace. An oak Eastlake-style staircase leads to the second floor. Behind the house sits a 2-story carriage house.

After the Joneses left the house in the early 20th century, it became a rental property and fell into disrepair. In 1995 James and Jan Chesmore bought it and began restoration work.
