= Fisher House =

Fisher House, or variations including Fisher Hall or Fisher Homestead, may refer to:

- Fisher House Foundation - an organization funding the construction of family lodging facilities near military hospitals

in England

- Fisher House, Cambridge - the Catholic Chaplaincy to the University of Cambridge

in the United States

(by state then city)

- Fisher Memorial Home, Casa Grande, Arizona, listed on the National Register of Historic Places (NRHP)
- Fisher/Goldwater House, Prescott, Arizona, listed on the NRHP
- John P. Fisher House, Portland, Arkansas
- William G. Fisher House, Denver, Colorado, listed on the NRHP
- Fisher-Zugelder House and Smith Cottage, Gunnison, Colorado
- Fisher Homestead (Lewes, Delaware)
- Andrew Fisher House, Newark, Delaware
- Fisher House (Lavonia, Georgia), listed on the NRHP
- Bushnell-Fisher House, Eagle, Idaho
- James M. Fisher House, Weiser, Idaho
- Fisher-Nash-Griggs House, Ottawa, Illinois
- Lewis M. Fisher House, Davenport, Iowa
- Fisher Homestead (Cloverport, Kentucky)
- Fisher House (Fisherville, Kentucky), listed on the NRHP in Jefferson County
- Applegate-Fisher House, West Point, Kentucky
- Fisher-Richardson House, Mansfield, Massachusetts
- Henry N. Fisher House, Waltham, Massachusetts
- Nathan Fisher House, Westborough, Massachusetts
- Nelson E. Fisher House – High Banks, Iron River, Michigan
- Burr Fisher House, Bozeman, Montana, listed on the NRHP
- Fisher House (Kalispell, Montana)
- Joseph Fisher House, Stevensville, Montana, listed on the NRHP
- E.D. Fisher House, Bolivar, Ohio, listed on the NRHP
- Fisher Hall (Oxford, Ohio)
- Ferdinand Fisher House, Astoria, Oregon
- Raymond and Catherine Fisher House, Portland, Oregon
- Thaddeus Fisher House, Portland, Oregon
- Fisher House (Hatboro, Pennsylvania)
- Maj. Jared B. Fisher House, Spring Mills, Pennsylvania
- Adam Fisher Homestead, United, Pennsylvania
- Henry Fisher House, Yellow House, Pennsylvania
- A.J. Fisher House, Walland, Tennessee
- Fisher Hall (San Marcos, Texas), San Marcos, Texas, listed on the NRHP
- David Fisher House, Heber City, Utah
- Albert Fisher Mansion and Carriage House, Salt Lake City, Utah

== See also ==
- Fisher Hall (disambiguation)
- Fisher Homestead (disambiguation)
