= National Register of Historic Places listings in Blount County, Tennessee =

Location of Blount County in Tennessee

This is a list of the National Register of Historic Places listings in Blount County, Tennessee.

This is intended to be a complete list of the properties and districts on the National Register of Historic Places in Blount County, Tennessee, United States. Latitude and longitude coordinates are provided for many National Register properties and districts; these locations may be seen together in a map.

There are 74 properties and districts listed on the National Register in the county. Another 5 properties were previously listed but have been removed.

Contents: Counties in Tennessee
Anderson – Bedford – Benton – Bledsoe – Blount – Bradley – Campbell – Cannon – Carroll – Carter – Cheatham – Chester – Claiborne – Clay – Cocke – Coffee – Crockett – Cumberland – Davidson – Decatur – DeKalb – Dickson – Dyer – Fayette – Fentress – Franklin – Gibson – Giles – Grainger – Greene – Grundy – Hamblen – Hamilton – Hancock – Hardeman – Hardin – Hawkins – Haywood – Henderson – Henry – Hickman – Houston – Humphreys – Jackson – Jefferson – Johnson – Knox – Lake – Lauderdale – Lawrence – Lewis – Lincoln – Loudon – Macon – Madison – Marion – Marshall – Maury – McMinn – McNairy – Meigs – Monroe – Montgomery – Moore – Morgan – Obion – Overton – Perry – Pickett – Polk – Putnam – Rhea – Roane – Robertson – Rutherford – Scott – Sequatchie – Sevier – Shelby – Smith – Stewart – Sullivan – Sumner – Tipton – Trousdale – Unicoi – Union – Van Buren – Warren – Washington – Wayne – Weakley – White – Williamson – Wilson

This National Park Service list is complete through NPS recent listings posted October 2, 2026.

== Current listings ==
	Name on the Register	Image	Date listed	Location	City or town	Description
1	John Alexander House	John Alexander House	July 25, 1989 (#89000864)	714 Hillside Ave. 35°45′15″N 83°57′35″W	Maryville	Built in 1906 by Maryville College alumnus John Alexander
2	Alumni Gym	Alumni Gym	July 25, 1989 (#89000865)	Maryville College campus 35°45′01″N 83°57′55″W	Maryville	Gymnasium built in 1923
3	Anderson Hall	Anderson Hall	February 20, 1975 (#75001732)	Maryville College campus 35°45′08″N 83°57′54″W	Maryville	
4	Peter Bartlett House	Peter Bartlett House	July 25, 1989 (#89000866)	315 High St. 35°45′20″N 83°58′02″W	Maryville	
5	Bethlehem Methodist Church	Bethlehem Methodist Church	July 25, 1989 (#89000867)	Bethlehem Rd., 0.5 miles south of Ellejoy Rd. 35°47′17″N 83°48′43″W	Wildwood	
6	Brick Mill Site		July 25, 1989 (#89000868)	Brick Mill Rd. 35°39′30″N 84°06′21″W	Maryville	
7	Peter Brickey House	Peter Brickey House	July 25, 1989 (#89000869)	Wears Valley Rd., 0.1 miles west of Bonner Hollow Rd. 35°41′25″N 83°42′33″W	Townsend	
8	Cades Cove Historic District	Cades Cove Historic District	July 13, 1977 (#77000111)	10 miles southwest of Townsend in Great Smoky Mountains National Park; 35°35′13″N 83°48′54″W	Townsend	
9	Calderwood Dam	Calderwood Dam	August 21, 1989 (#89001069)	Little Tennessee River at the end of Calderwood Rd. 35°29′32″N 83°58′58″W	Calderwood	Extends into Monroe County. The dam was listed in 1989; boundaries were increased on July 3, 1990 to include the powerhouse, valve house, tunnels, and penstocks.
10	Calderwood Hydroelectric Development	Calderwood Hydroelectric Development	May 24, 2004 (#04000545)	314 Growdon Boulevard; 35°29′56″N 83°59′15″W	Calderwood	This is a supplementary listing to the Calderwood Dam entry that added the complex's gatehouse, gantry cranes, surge tank, chlorination building, and service building, as well as a theater and school once used by the old Calderwood community.
11	Chilhowee Hydroelectric Development	Chilhowee Hydroelectric Development	May 27, 2004 (#04000546)	6102 State Route 129; 35°32′45″N 84°03′00″W	Tallassee	
12	Langston Clark Barn	Langston Clark Barn	July 25, 1989 (#89000870)	Sixmile Rd., 0.4 miles east of Knob Creek Rd. 35°38′15″N 84°00′04″W	Maryville	
13	Clover Hill Mill	Clover Hill Mill	July 25, 1989 (#89000871)	Junction of Mill Rd. and Clover Hill Rd. 35°42′15″N 84°03′01″W	Maryville	
14	Cloyd's Creek Presbyterian Church	Cloyd's Creek Presbyterian Church	July 25, 1989 (#89000873)	Junction of Buzzard's Roost Rd. and Kirk Rd. 35°41′52″N 84°09′37″W	Friendsville	The church was established in 1871, and the current building was completed the following year
15	Mary Cochrane Barn	Mary Cochrane Barn	July 25, 1989 (#89000872)	Binfield Rd., 0.2 miles north of Clover Hill Rd. 35°41′51″N 84°03′53″W	Maryville	
16	John J. Craig Quarry Historic District	John J. Craig Quarry Historic District	July 25, 1989 (#89000874)	Marmor Rd., 0.5 miles south of Miser Station Rd. 35°46′25″N 84°06′33″W	Friendsville	Early-20th century Tennessee pink marble quarry
17	Gideon Crawford House	Gideon Crawford House	July 25, 1989 (#89000875)	Maryville College campus 35°45′04″N 83°57′41″W	Maryville	
18	James R. Davis House	James R. Davis House	July 25, 1989 (#89000876)	Junction of River Rd. and Davis Ford Rd. 35°46′19″N 83°51′01″W	Walland	
19	Federal Building	Federal Building	August 31, 1989 (#89001217)	201 E. Broadway; 35°45′24″N 83°58′15″W	Maryville	Post office and federal building constructed under the supervision of James A. Wetmore
20	A.J. Fisher House	A.J. Fisher House	July 25, 1989 (#89000877)	Old Walland Highway; 35°43′48″N 83°48′50″W	Walland	
21	Samuel Frazier House	Samuel Frazier House	July 25, 1989 (#89000878)	Junction of Marble Hill Rd. and Big Springs Rd. 35°44′24″N 84°06′59″W	Friendsville	Late-18th century house built of locally-quarried dark marble
22	Friends Church	Friends Church	July 25, 1989 (#89000879)	314 W. Broadway; 35°45′11″N 83°58′25″W	Maryville	
23	Samuel George House	Samuel George House	January 27, 1982 (#82003952)	Northeast of Louisville on Topside Rd. 35°50′29″N 84°00′07″W	Louisville	Brick house built in the early 1800s
24	John Hackney House		July 25, 1989 (#89000881)	Front and Main Sts. 35°45′27″N 84°07′54″W	Friendsville	
25	John Hackney Mill Site		July 25, 1989 (#89000882)	Main St. near Front St. 35°45′22″N 84°07′55″W	Friendsville	
26	Alexander Hamil House	Alexander Hamil House	July 25, 1989 (#89000883)	Morganton Rd., 0.5 miles east of Clover Hill Rd. 35°42′45″N 84°04′03″W	Maryville	Brick "I" section built in the 1830s; frame front section built c. 1885
27	Happy Valley School	Happy Valley School	July 25, 1989 (#89000884)	Happy Valley Rd. 35°36′35″N 83°57′22″W	Maryville	Located in the Happy Valley community; later converted into a meeting hall
28	Harper Memorial Library	Harper Memorial Library	July 25, 1989 (#89000885)	300 E. Church St. 35°45′24″N 83°58′10″W	Maryville	
29	William Henderson House		July 25, 1989 (#89000886)	Louisville Rd., 0.75 miles south of Lowes Ferry Rd. 35°49′26″N 84°05′41″W	Louisville	
30	Henry House	Henry House	November 1, 1974 (#74001901)	Southwest of Binfield on Henry Lane; Boundary increase (listed July 6, 2011): Henry Farm, 305 Henry Ln., Brick Mill vicinity 35°40′15″N 84°06′25″W	Binfield	Farmhouse on the farm founded by Samuel Henry, Revolutionary War quartermaster who arrived in Blount County as early as 1792, built a fort called Henry’s Station, and established a farm on his land grant. The substantial farmhouse was built in 1833 by Samuel's son James and his wife, Narcissa Howard, reportedly using brick made by slaves from red clay excavated on the farm property.
31	John Hitch House	John Hitch House	April 16, 1993 (#89000924)	Lee Lambert Rd., 0.5 miles south of Old Walland Highway; 35°45′04″N 83°52′55″W	Maryville	
32	Pete Hood House	Pete Hood House	July 25, 1989 (#89000888)	827 W. Broadway; 35°44′55″N 83°58′50″W	Maryville	Residence of early ALCOA executive Benton Glascock and his descendants
33	Indiana Avenue Historic District	Indiana Avenue Historic District	August 21, 1989 (#89001071)	Roughly bounded by Goddard St., Court St., Indiana Ave., and Cates St. 35°45′00″N 83°58′07″W	Maryville	Now called the College Hill Historic District; includes several dozen houses built circa 1880–1940
34	David Jones House	David Jones House	July 25, 1989 (#89000889)	404 High St. 35°45′21″N 83°57′56″W	Maryville	
35	David Jones House	David Jones House	August 26, 1982 (#82004840)	720 Tuckaleechee Pike; 35°45′19″N 83°57′42″W	Maryville	
36	Macklin Kerr House	Macklin Kerr House	July 25, 1989 (#89000891)	Big Gully Rd., 0.3 miles north of Kyker Rd. 35°36′19″N 84°07′26″W	Maryville	Built circa 1847; briefly housed Union soldiers during the Civil War
37	Hezekiah Kizer House	Hezekiah Kizer House	July 25, 1989 (#89000892)	0.5 miles south of the junction of Marble Hill Rd. and Dunlap Hollow Rd. 35°42′49″N 84°09′07″W	Maryville	
38	Look Rock Observation Tower	Look Rock Observation Tower	October 12, 2017 (#100001750)	Foothills Pkwy. W. 35°37′57″N 83°56′35″W	Walland vicinity	
39	Louisville Historic District	Louisville Historic District	December 23, 1974 (#74001902)	Between railroad tracks and the Tennessee River; 35°49′23″N 84°03′01″W	Louisville	Additional documentation, December 2013
40	James Martin House	James Martin House	July 25, 1989 (#89000893)	Martin Rd., 1 mile east of E. Millers Cove Rd. 35°43′47″N 83°47′46″W	Walland	
41	John Martin Mill	John Martin Mill	July 25, 1989 (#89000894)	Mill Rd., 0.3 miles south of W. Millers Cove Rd. 35°42′33″N 83°49′24″W	Walland	
42	Warner Martin House	Warner Martin House	July 25, 1989 (#89000895)	Central Point Rd. at Old Nails Creek; 35°49′19″N 83°52′46″W	Rockford	Circa-1790s frame house
43	Maryville College Historic District	Maryville College Historic District	September 9, 1982 (#82003953)	Washington St. 35°45′07″N 83°57′51″W	Maryville	Includes Willard House (1891), Bartlett Hall (1901), Fayerweather Science Hall (1898), Carnegie Hall (1917), Thaw Hall (1923), and several others
44	James McCampbell Barn		July 25, 1989 (#89000896)	Old Cades Cove Rd., 0.1 miles south of Dry Valley Rd. 35°39′55″N 83°47′21″W	Townsend	
45	Minnis McCampbell Barn		July 25, 1989 (#89000897)	Old Cades Cove Rd., 0.1 miles south of Dry Valley Rd. 35°39′54″N 83°47′14″W	Townsend	
46	John McConnell House	John McConnell House	July 25, 1989 (#89000898)	McConnell Rd., 0.5 miles west of Maple Lane Rd. 35°41′27″N 84°08′24″W	Maryville	
47	Thomas McCullock House		July 25, 1989 (#89000899)	Junction of Martin Mill Pike and State Route 33; 35°49′21″N 83°56′17″W	Rockford	
48	McNutt-Howard House	McNutt-Howard House	July 25, 1989 (#89000900)	825 W. Broadway Ave. 35°44′59″N 83°58′49″W	Maryville	
49	Millennium Manor		November 18, 2020 (#100005788)	500 North Wright Rd. 35°46′48″N 83°57′54″W	Alcoa	
50	Miser Station Store	Miser Station Store	July 25, 1989 (#89000902)	Junction of Miser School Rd. and Miser Station Rd. 35°46′41″N 84°05′29″W	Friendsville	Rural grocery store built c. 1925
51	Morningside	Morningside	July 25, 1989 (#89000904)	Maryville College campus 35°44′45″N 83°57′37″W	Maryville	
52	Samuel A. Patton Building	Samuel A. Patton Building	July 25, 1989 (#89000905)	114 E. Broadway Ave. 35°45′23″N 83°58′15″W	Maryville	Late-19th century commercial building that once housed a jewelry store; now a bar known as "The Sandwich Shop"
53	Peery Mill Site	Peery Mill Site	July 25, 1989 (#89000887)	Old Walland Highway, 0.1 miles north of Cold Springs Rd. 35°44′58″N 83°50′07″W	Walland	Mill dam located downstream from the Misty River Campground
54	People's Bank of Friendsville	People's Bank of Friendsville	July 25, 1989 (#89000906)	College St. 35°45′36″N 84°08′02″W	Friendsville	Built in 1915; the bank operated until forced to close during the Great Depression
55	Pistol Creek Dam and Mill Race	Pistol Creek Dam and Mill Race	July 25, 1989 (#89000907)	Pistol Creek between Church Ave. and Ellis St. 35°45′07″N 83°58′01″W	Maryville	Ruins of the Pistol Creek Mill, located just off the greenway at Greenbelt Park
56	Stephen Porter House		July 25, 1989 (#89000908)	Martin Mill Pike, 0.2 miles west of Glover Rd. 35°49′20″N 83°54′15″W	Rockford	
57	John M. Rorex House	John M. Rorex House	July 25, 1989 (#89000909)	Junction of Brick Mill Rd. and Old Niles Ferry Rd. 35°39′30″N 84°06′18″W	Maryville	
58	Russell-Lackey-Prater House		November 20, 1989 (#89001961)	Prater Rd. off Old Lowes Ferry Rd. at Poland Creek; 35°50′04″N 84°06′32″W	Louisville	No longer extant per Google Earth.
59	Sam Houston Schoolhouse	Sam Houston Schoolhouse	June 13, 1972 (#72001228)	Northeast of Maryville on State Route 8; 35°48′07″N 83°54′16″W	Maryville	One-room log cabin schoolhouse, built in 1794, where Sam Houston taught as a young man
60	Shaddon Mill Site		August 21, 1989 (#89001094)	Ninemile Creek at junction of Big Elm and Trigonia Rds. 35°36′21″N 84°10′21″W	Maryville	
61	John F. Shea House	John F. Shea House	July 25, 1989 (#89000910)	Old Walland Highway; 35°40′37″N 83°45′20″W	Townsend	Queen Anne-style house built in 1904 by Little River Lumber Company executive John Shea
62	Southern Railroad Bridge	Southern Railroad Bridge	July 25, 1989 (#89000911)	Southern Railroad right-of-way over the Little River; 35°50′52″N 83°56′45″W	Rockford	Truss bridge built in 1930 by the Edgemoor Bridge Works
63	Southern Railroad Freight Depot	Southern Railroad Freight Depot	July 25, 1989 (#89000912)	Southern Railroad right-of-way between Sevierville Rd. and Washington Ave. 35°45′30″N 83°57′53″W	Maryville	
64	Dr. William P. Stevenson House	Dr. William P. Stevenson House	July 25, 1989 (#89000913)	Maryville College campus 35°44′45″N 83°57′21″W	Maryville	Now called the "House in the Woods"
65	Thompson-Brown House	Thompson-Brown House	November 2, 1978 (#78002574)	1005 Tuckleechee Pike; 35°45′16″N 83°57′22″W	Maryville	
66	Carl Trundle Barn	Carl Trundle Barn	July 25, 1989 (#89000890)	Junction of U.S. Route 411 and Wildwood Rd. 35°48′01″N 83°51′30″W	Wildwood	Double-cantilever barn
67	Tabler Vineyard House		July 25, 1989 (#89000914)	Hollybrook Rd., 1 mile north of Martin Mill Pike; 35°49′59″N 83°54′20″W	Rockford	Name is misspelled in Register as "Tobler" Vineyard House.
68	Vose School		July 24, 2017 (#100001368)	Birch & Locust Sts. 35°47′45″N 83°58′20″W	Alcoa	
69	Walland Bridge	Walland Bridge	July 25, 1989 (#89000915)	Old Walland Rd. over the Little River; 35°43′46″N 83°48′58″W	Walland	Located just upstream from the modern vehicle bridge, and accessible from the gas station at junction of 321 and E. Millers Cove Rd.
70	Walland Power Plant	Walland Power Plant	July 25, 1989 (#89000916)	Old Walland Highway, 0.75 miles north of Walland; 35°44′11″N 83°49′23″W	Walland	Partial mill dam located just upstream from the Misty River Campground
71	Marcus Warren House	Marcus Warren House	July 25, 1989 (#89000917)	Miser Station Rd., 0.2 miles south of Middle Settlement Rd. 35°47′44″N 84°03′26″W	Louisville	Built late-19th century; the Warren Farm is now a Tennessee Century Farm
72	White's Mill	White's Mill	July 25, 1989 (#89000918)	Old White's Mill Rd. 35°44′03″N 83°53′02″W	Maryville	
73	Willard-Clark House	Willard-Clark House	July 25, 1989 (#89000919)	1125 Broadway; 35°44′42″N 83°59′04″W	Maryville	Built in the early 1900s, designed by Charles H. Young
74	Isaac Yearout House	Isaac Yearout House	July 25, 1989 (#89000920)	Big Springs Rd., 0.3 miles north of Morganton Rd. 35°44′59″N 84°00′25″W	Alcoa	

== Former listings ==
Three other sites were previously listed, but have been removed:

	Name on the Register	Image	Date listed	Date removed	Location	City or town	Description
1	Alcoa South Plant Office	Alcoa South Plant Office	August 18, 1989 (#89001070)	March 10, 2009	Hall Road	Alcoa	
2	Alcoa West Plant Office		July 25, 1989 (#89000863)	November 15, 2006	Lodge Street	Alcoa	Demolished in November, 1996.
3	James Gillespie House	James Gillespie House	July 25, 1989 (#89000880)	October 27, 2022	Lowes Ferry Rd., 1 mile north of Louisville; 35°50′30″N 84°05′14″W	Louisville	
4	Little River Lumber Company Office		November 8, 1974 (#74001903)	November 10, 1986	TN 73	Townsend	Destroyed by fire in September, 1986.
5	McNutt-McReynolds House		July 25, 1989 (#89000901)	October 28, 2021	803 W. Broadway Ave. 35°45′00″N 83°58′47″W	Maryville	Demolished between 2003 and 2006.

== See also ==
- List of National Historic Landmarks in Tennessee
- National Register of Historic Places listings in Tennessee
