= Fisher Homestead =

Fisher Homestead may refer to:

- Fisher Homestead (Lewes, Delaware), listed on the NRHP in Delaware
- Fisher Homestead (Cloverport, Kentucky), listed on the NRHP in Kentucky
- Adam Fisher Homestead, United, Pennsylvania, listed on the National Register of Historic Places listings in Westmoreland County, Pennsylvania

== See also ==
- Fisher House (disambiguation)
