= Indiana Avenue Historic District =

Indiana Avenue Historic District may refer to:

- Indiana Avenue Historic District (Indianapolis, Indiana), listed on the National Register of Historic Places in Indianapolis, Indiana
- Indiana Avenue Historic District in Maryville, Tennessee, included in the College Hill Historic District (Maryville, Tennessee)
