= Morningside =

Morningside may refer to:

== Places ==
=== Australia ===
- Morningside, Queensland, a suburb in Brisbane

=== Canada ===
- Morningside, Alberta, a hamlet
- Morningside, Toronto, a neighbourhood in Scarborough
- Morningside Avenue (Toronto), a street in Scarborough
- Morningside Park (Toronto), a park in Scarborough

=== New Zealand ===
- Morningside, Auckland, a suburb of Auckland
- Morningside, Northland, a suburb of Whangarei

=== South Africa ===
- Morningside, Gauteng
- Morningside, Durban

=== United Kingdom ===
- Morningside, Edinburgh, Scotland
- Morningside, North Lanarkshire, Scotland

=== United States ===
- MorningSide, Detroit, a neighborhood within Detroit, Michigan
- Morningside, Maryland, a town
- Morningside (Miami), a neighborhood within the city of Miami, Florida
- Morningside, Minnesota, a neighborhood in Edina, Minnesota
- Morningside, New Mexico, an unincorporated community and census-designated place in Eddy County, New Mexico
- Morningside, Oregon, an area of Salem, Oregon
- Morningside (Pittsburgh), Pennsylvania
- Morningside Park, neighborhood in Inglewood, California
- Morningside, South Dakota, a census-designated place
- Morningside (Maryville, Tennessee), a historic house
- Morningside, Roanoke, Virginia
- New York City:
  - Morningside Heights, a neighborhood in Manhattan
  - Morningside Park (New York City), a park in Manhattan
  - Morningside Drive (Manhattan), a street in Manhattan

== Schools ==
- Morningside University, a private institution in Sioux City, Iowa, USA
- Morningside College (Hong Kong), a college of the Chinese University of Hong Kong
- Morningside High School, Inglewood, California, USA
- Morningside High School, Port Elizabeth, South Africa

== Other uses ==
- Morningside (radio program), formerly a program on CBC Radio
- Morningside Australian Football Club, Brisbane, Australia
- Morningside, a 2017 album by Fazerdaze
- "Morningside", a song by Neil Diamond on Moods
- "Morningside", a song by Sara Bareilles from Little Voice
- Morningside Foundation, charitable foundation of real state tycoon T. H. Chan and family, a large-scale donor to the Harvard School of Public Health and the eponymous Morningside College (Hong Kong)
- The Morningside, a 2024 novel by Téa Obreht
- Morningside (film), a Canadian film released in 2024
