= Rorex =

Rorex is a surname. Notable people with the surname include:

- Clela Rorex (1943–2022), American county clerk
- Jeanne Rorex-Bridges (a.k.a. Jeanne Walker Rorex, born 1951), American painter and illustrator

== See also ==
- John M. Rorex House, historic house in Tennessee, U.S.
