= Isaac Yearout House =

Historic house in Tennessee, United States

- U.S. National Register of Historic Places
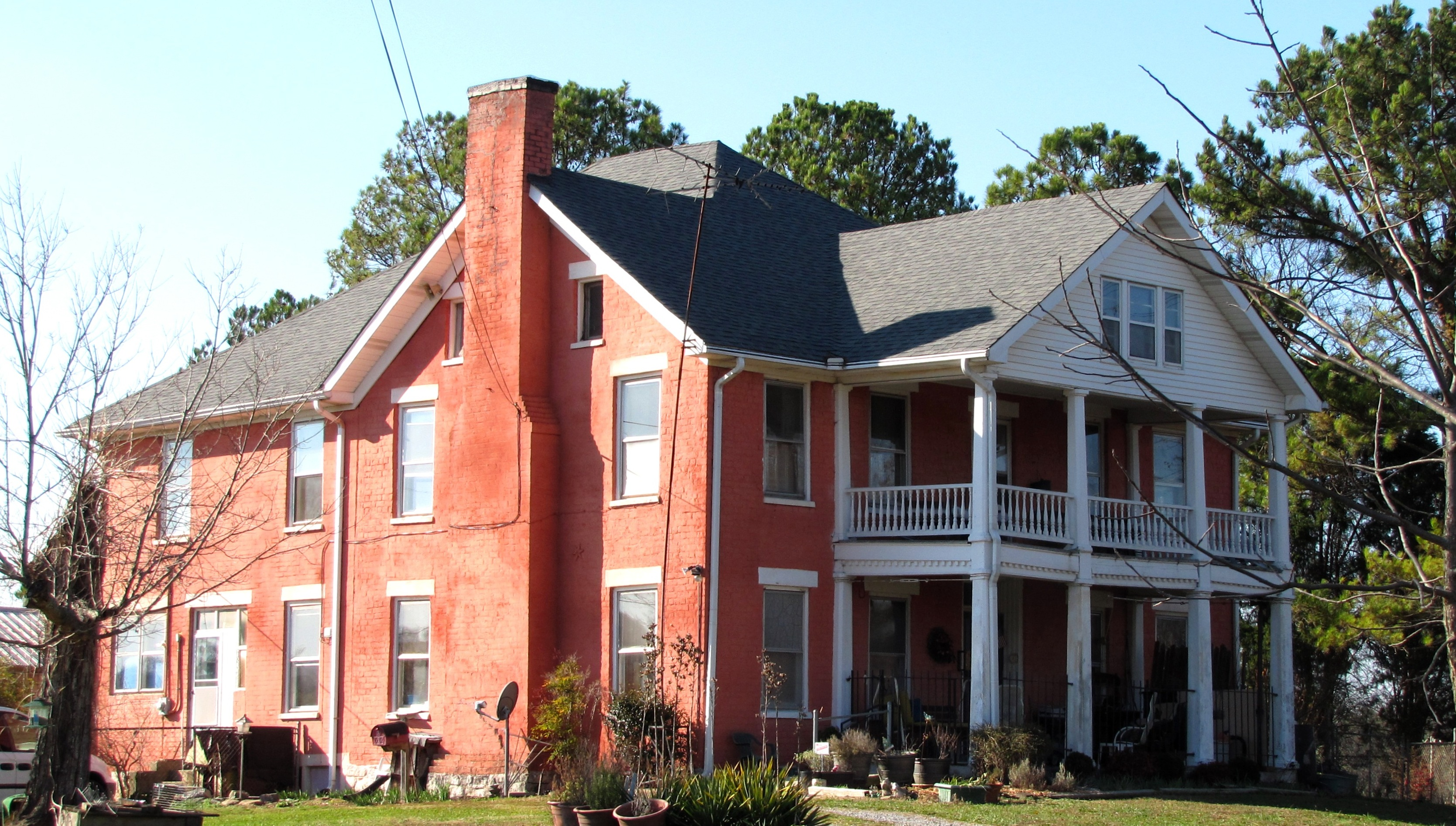
- The Isaac Yearout House in 2010

- Location within Tennessee Location within the United States
- Nearest city: Maryville, Tennessee
- Coordinates: 35°44′59″N 84°0′25″W
- Area: 1.7 acres (0.69 ha)
- Built: 1911
- Architectural style: Classical Revival
- MPS: Blount County MPS
- NRHP reference No.: 89000920
- Added to NRHP: July 25, 1989

The Isaac Yearout House is a historic house in Alcoa, Tennessee, U.S..

== History ==
The house was built circa 1817 as a farm near Pistol Creek for Isaac Yearout. It was inherited by his son Isaac Newton Yearout, followed by his grandson John M. Yearout, who expanded it in 1911. In 1928, the Yearouts sold the house to another family.

== Architectural significance ==
The house was designed in the Classical Revival architectural style. It has been listed on the National Register of Historic Places since July 25, 1989.
