= John Alexander House =

Historic house in Tennessee, United States

- U.S. National Register of Historic Places
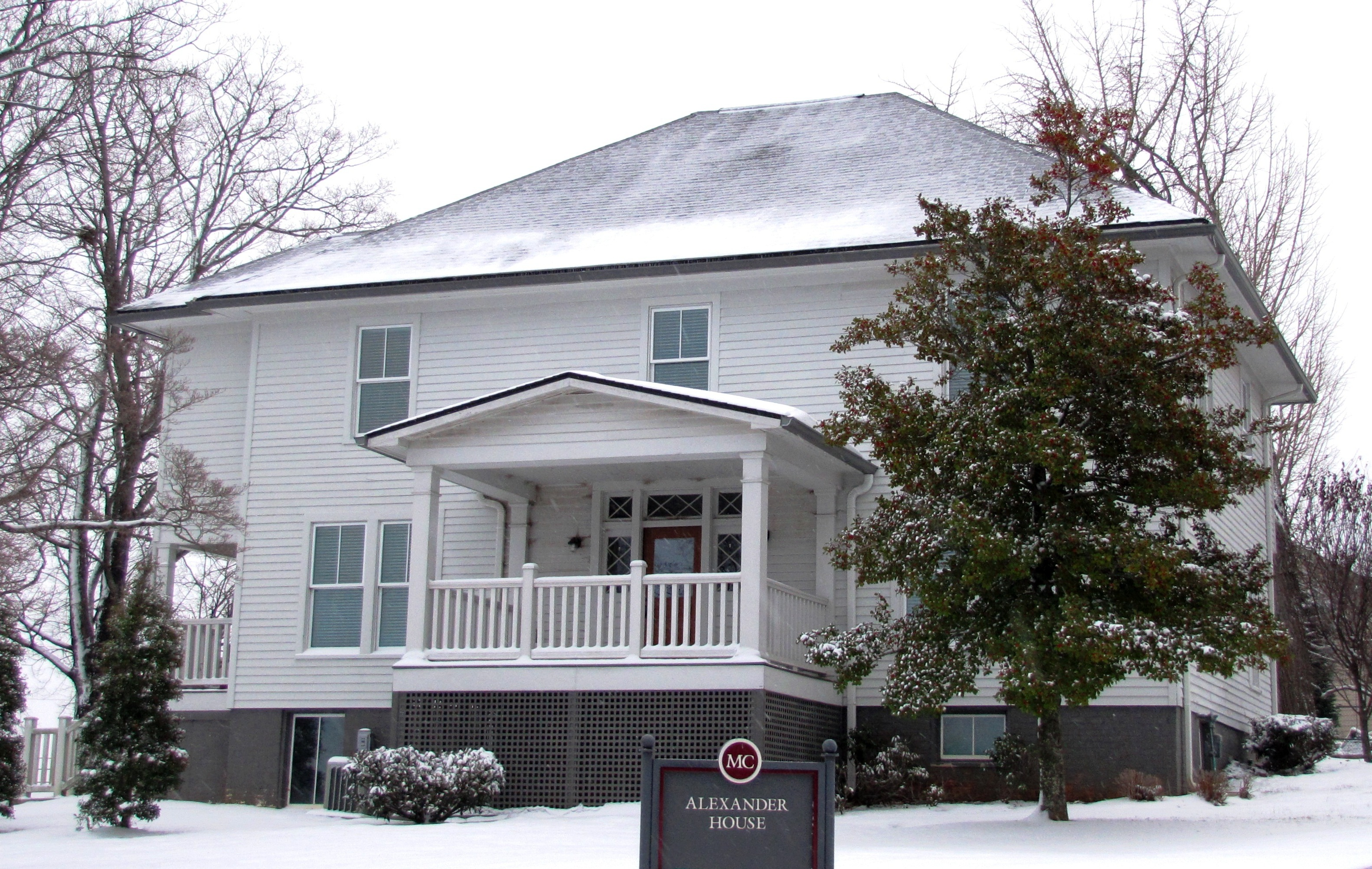
- The house in 2010

- Location within Tennessee
- Location: 714 Hillside Avenue, Maryville, Tennessee
- Coordinates: 35°45′15″N 83°57′35″W
- Area: less than one acre
- Architectural style: Colonial Revival
- MPS: Blount County MPS
- NRHP reference No.: 89000864
- Added to NRHP: July 25, 1989

The John Alexander House is a historic house in Maryville, Tennessee. It was built in 1906 for Presbyterian minister John Alexander, and designed in the Colonial Revival architectural style. It is listed on the National Register of Historic Places, and it is owned by Maryville College.

== History ==
The two-story house was built in 1906 for Reverend John Alexander, a Presbyterian minister who graduated from Maryville College in 1887 and served on its board of directors for five decades. Alexander lived here with his wife, Jane Bancroft Smith Alexander, an English and History professor at Maryville College.

The house was acquired by Maryville College in 1925. It was saved from demolition and restored by Eldria Hurst, the campus chief of security, and his wife in 1967.

== Architectural significance ==
The house was designed in the Colonial Revival architectural style. It has been listed on the National Register of Historic Places since July 25, 1989.
