= McNutt-Howard House =

- McNutt--Howard House
- U.S. National Register of Historic Places
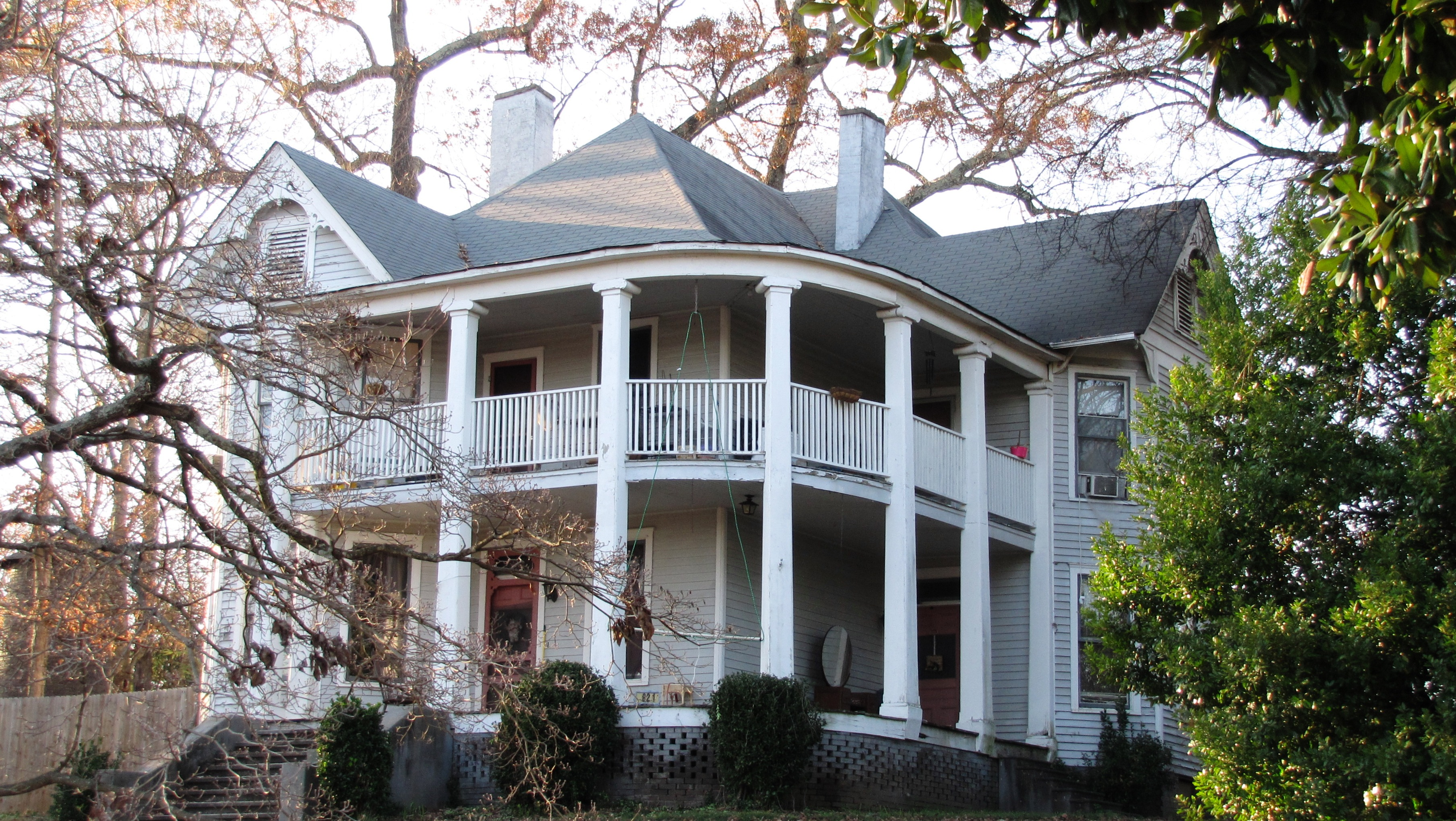
- The McNutt-Howard House in 2010

- Location within Tennessee Location within the United States
- Location: 825 West Broadway Avenue, Maryville, Tennessee
- Coordinates: 35°44′59″N 83°58′49″W
- Area: less than one acre
- Built: 1900
- Architectural style: Classical Revival, Queen Anne
- MPS: Blount County MPS
- NRHP reference No.: 89000900
- Added to NRHP: July 25, 1989

The McNutt-Howard House is a historic house in Maryville, Tennessee, U.S.. It was built circa 1900 for Robert G. McNutt. It was built in the Queen Anne and Classical Revival architectural styles. It belonged to W. B. Howard from 1908 to the 1930s. It has been listed on the National Register of Historic Places since July 25, 1989.
