= Fisher Hall =

Fisher Hall may refer to:

- Avery Fisher Hall, a concert hall in New York City
- Fisher Hall (Miami University), formerly listed on the National Register of Historic Places in Butler County, Ohio
- Fisher Hall (San Marcos, Texas), listed on the National Register of Historic Places in Hays County, Texas
- Fisher Hall (University of Notre Dame), a residential hall

== See also ==
- Fisher House (disambiguation)
