= Willard–Clark House =

Historic house in Tennessee, United States

- U.S. National Register of Historic Places
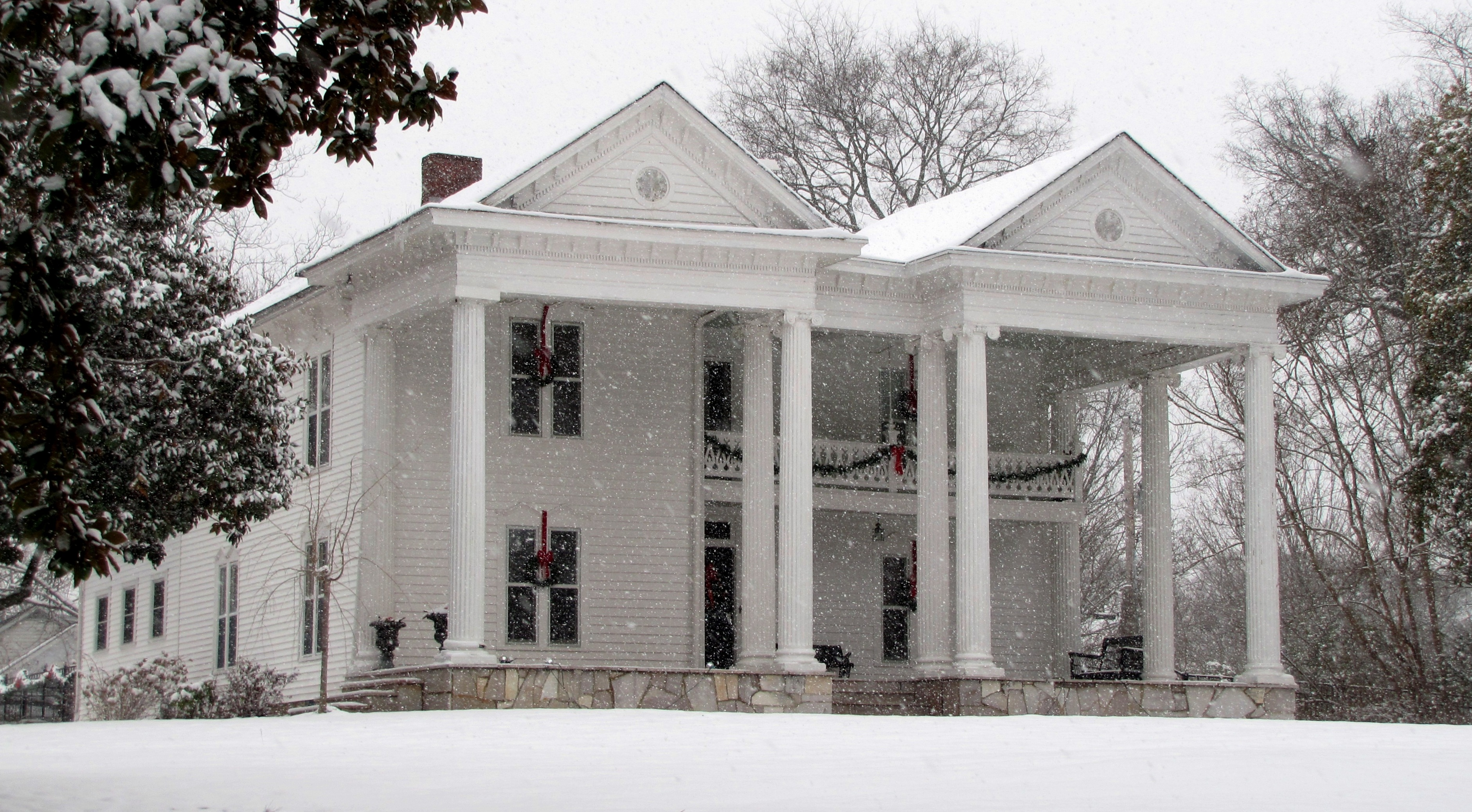
- The Willard–Clark House in 2010

- Location within Tennessee Location within the United States
- Location: 1125 Broadway, Maryville, Tennessee
- Coordinates: 35°44′42″N 83°59′4″W
- Area: less than one acre
- Architect: Charles H. Young
- Architectural style: Classical Revival
- MPS: Blount County MPS
- NRHP reference No.: 89000919
- Added to NRHP: July 25, 1989

The Willard–Clark House is a historic two-story mansion in Maryville, Tennessee, U.S.. It was built for B.F. Willard in 1886. The Willards owned the house until 1903, and it was purchased by J. L. Clark in 1905. In 1910, Clark added a portico, designed in the Classical Revival architectural style. They also the house to Elmer L. Hudson in 1929, who sold it to Granville R. Swaney in 1931. It has been listed on the National Register of Historic Places since July 25, 1989.
