= McNutt-McReynolds House =

Historic house in Tennessee, United States

- Formerly listed on the U.S. National Register of Historic Places
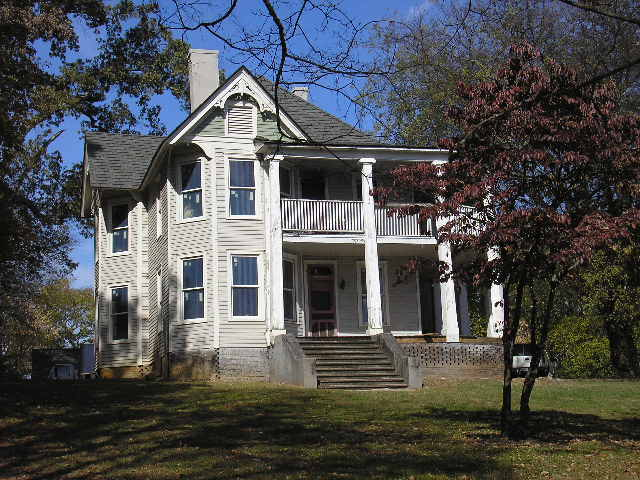
- The McNutt-McReynolds House in 2015

- Location within Tennessee Location within the United States
- Location: 803 West Broadway Avenue, Maryville, Tennessee
- Coordinates: 35°45′0″N 83°58′47″W
- Area: 1.3 acres (0.53 ha)
- Built: 1900
- Architectural style: Queen Anne
- MPS: Blount County MPS
- NRHP reference No.: 89000901

Significant dates
- Added to NRHP: July 25, 1989
- Removed from NRHP: October 28, 2021

The McNutt-McReynolds House is a historic house in Maryville, Tennessee, U.S..It was built circa 1900 for Robert G. McNutt, a merchant. It was designed in the Queen Anne architectural style. It was purchased by J. A. Reynolds in 1906, and by Dr. W. B. Lovingood in 1920. It was listed on the National Register of Historic Places on July 25, 1989, and was delisted on October 28, 2021.
