= Samuel George House =

Historic house in Tennessee, United States

- U.S. National Register of Historic Places
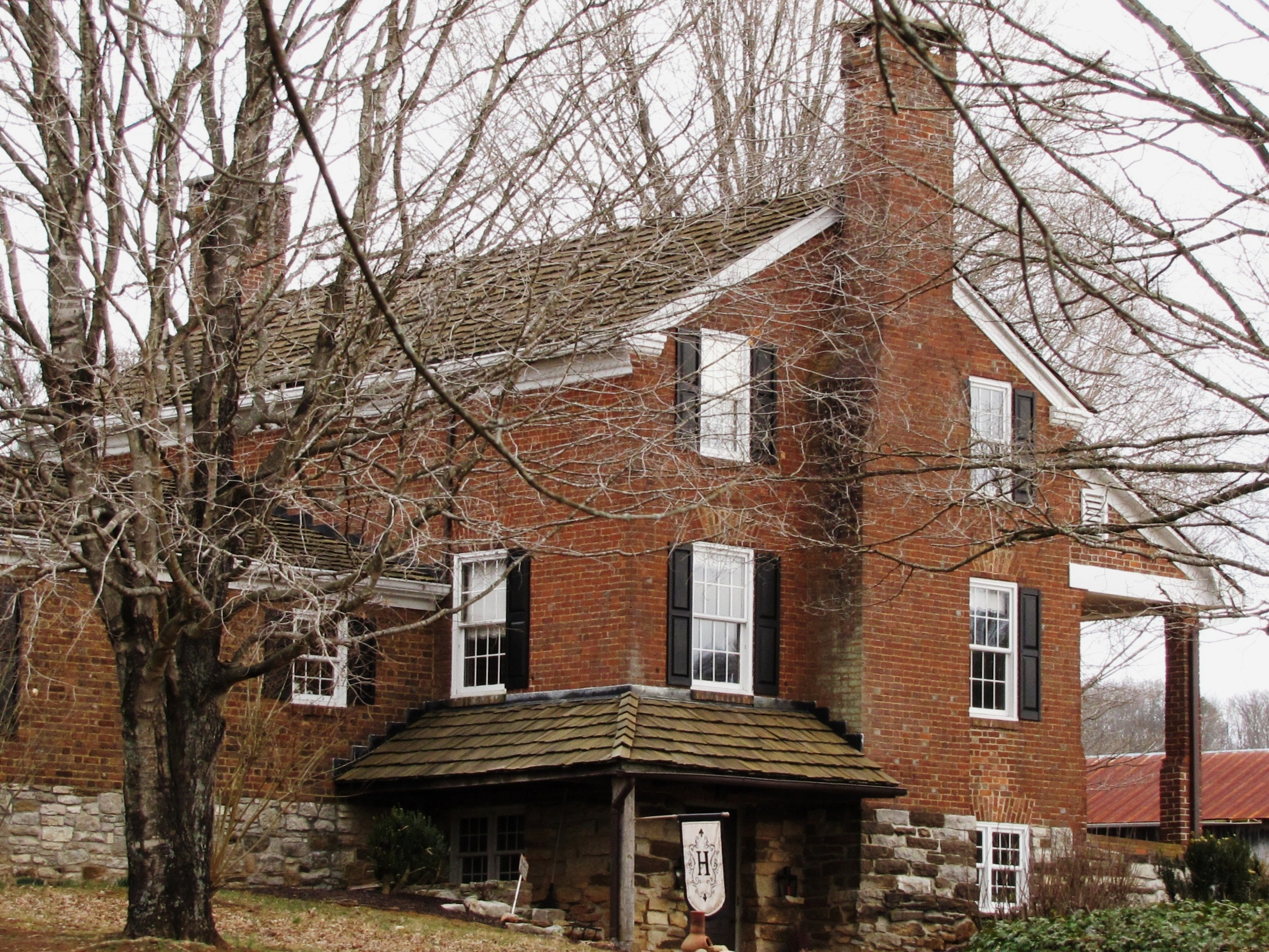
- The Samuel George House in 2011

- Location within Tennessee Location within the United States
- Nearest city: Louisville, Tennessee
- Coordinates: 35°50′29″N 84°0′7″W
- Area: 0.5 acres (0.20 ha)
- Built: 1815
- Architect: George, Samuel
- NRHP reference No.: 82003952
- Added to NRHP: January 27, 1982

The Samuel George House is a historic house in Louisville, Tennessee, U.S.. It was built with slave labor circa 1815 for Samuel George, a farmer. By 1978, it still belonged to the George family. It has been listed on the National Register of Historic Places since January 27, 1982.
