= John M. Rorex House =

Historic house in Tennessee, United States

- U.S. National Register of Historic Places
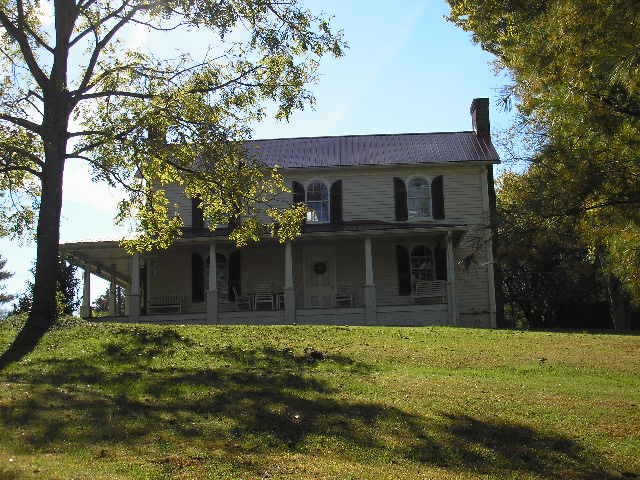
- The John M. Rorex House in 2015

- Location within Tennessee Location within the United States
- Nearest city: Maryville, Tennessee
- Coordinates: 35°39′30″N 84°6′18″W
- Area: 1.6 acres (0.65 ha)
- Built: 1875
- Architectural style: Italianate, I-House
- MPS: Blount County MPS
- NRHP reference No.: 89000909
- Added to NRHP: July 25, 1989

The John M. Rorex House is a historic house in Maryville, Tennessee, U.S.. It was built circa 1875 for John M. Rorex, a farmer. It was designed in the Italianate architectural style. It was purchased by Mary Armstrong in 1902, and by the Kimbroughs in 1953. It has been listed on the National Register of Historic Places since July 25, 1989.
