= Bethlehem Methodist Church =

Historic church in Tennessee, United States

- U.S. National Register of Historic Places
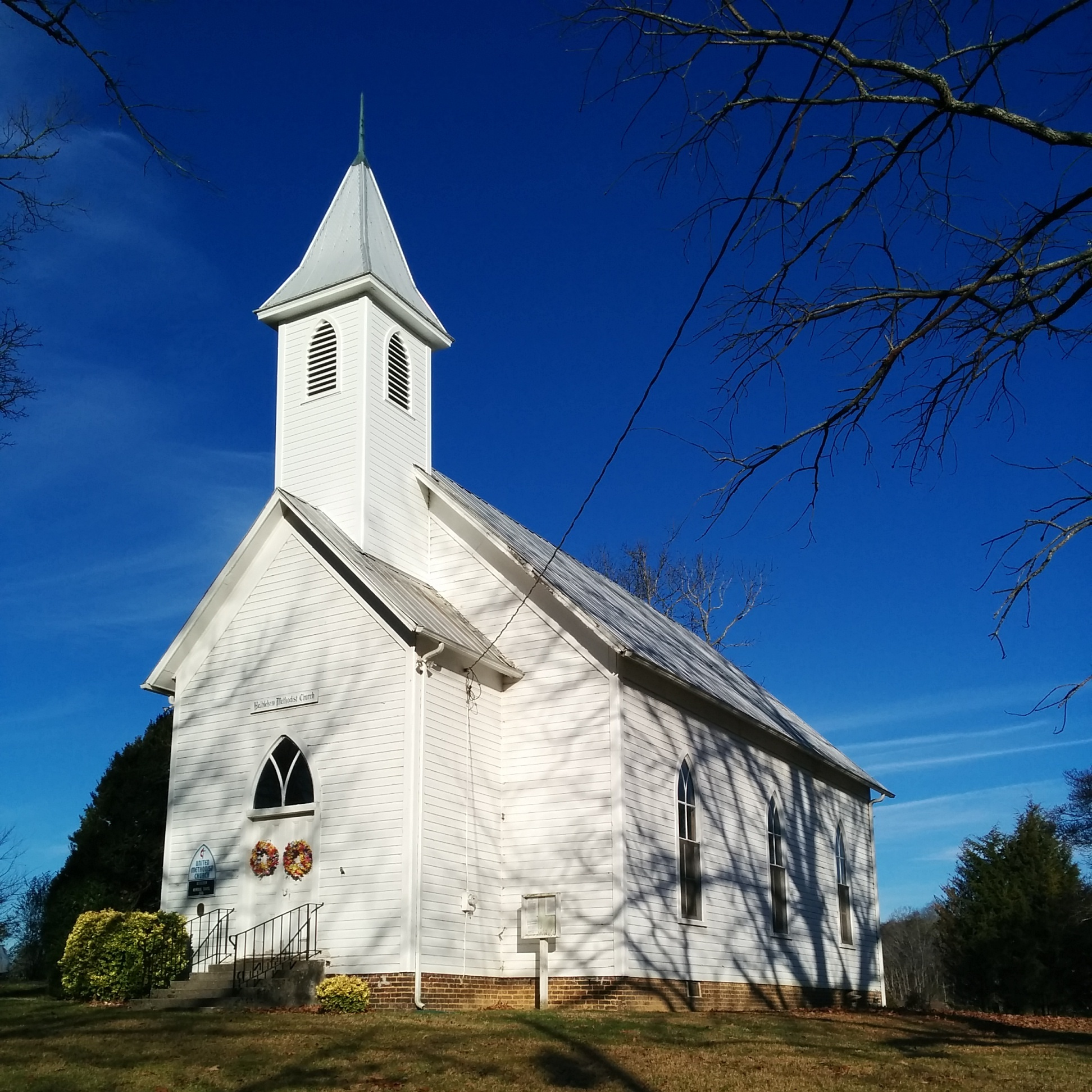

- Location within Tennessee Location within the United States
- Nearest city: Wildwood, Tennessee
- Coordinates: 35°47′17″N 83°48′43″W
- Area: 2 acres (0.81 ha)
- Built: 1886
- Architectural style: Gothic Revival
- MPS: Blount County MPS
- NRHP reference No.: 89000867
- Added to NRHP: July 25, 1989

Bethlehem Methodist Church is a historic church in Wildwood, Tennessee.

The church was organized in 1886 and its Gothic Revival building was completed that same year. The church building has a gable front and a prominent bell tower. The doorway and windows are crowned by Gothic arches, elements of the Gothic Revival style that was popular for late 19th-century churches in the region.

The congregation was dissolved in 1966, but the church is still used sometimes for weddings, funerals, and other special occasions. The church and its adjacent cemetery were added to the National Register of Historic Places in 1989.
