= Fisher–Richardson House =

Historic house in Massachusetts, United States

- U.S. National Register of Historic Places
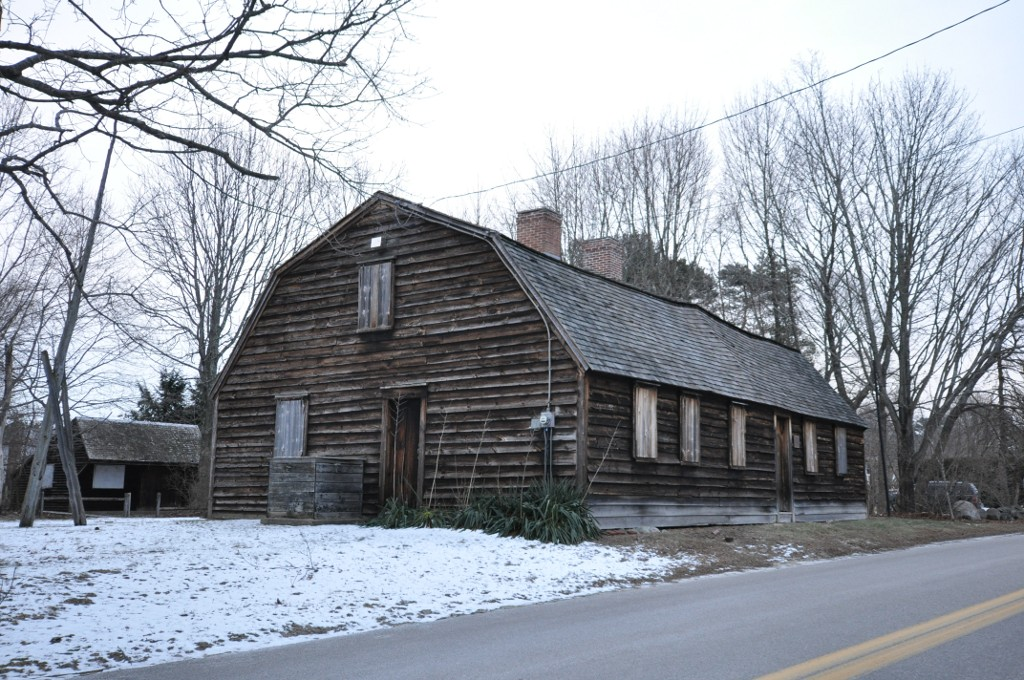

- Location within Massachusetts Location within the United States
- Location: 354 Willow St., Mansfield, Massachusetts
- Coordinates: 42°0′37″N 71°13′42″W
- Built: c. 1743
- Architectural style: Colonial Revival, Colonial
- NRHP reference No.: 98000096
- Added to NRHP: February 11, 1998

The Fisher–Richardson House is a historic house at 354 Willow Street in Mansfield, Massachusetts. Built between 1743 and 1751, it is considered to be the town's second oldest house. The house was restored in 1930, and is now a local history museum.

== Description and history ==
The Fisher–Richardson House is set close to the north side of Willow Street in a residential area of central Mansfield. It is a 1 1/2-story, wood-framed structure, six bays wide, with a gambrel wood shingle roof, two internal chimneys, and clapboard siding. The front facade bays are irregularly spaced, with the door set right of center. The interior features wide pine floors, ceilings with exposed beams, and beaded paneling on the walls. Mantels and some other features are recreations made as part of the 1930 restoration.

The house was built by Ebenezer Wellman sometime between 1743 and 1751, using a plank-frame method popular in the area at the time. In about 1800 the size of the house was nearly doubled by the construction of its western half by Lemuel Fisher. The property was later inherited by Ira Richardson, who had married into the locally prominent Fisher family. In 1929, after the last local Richardson died, the house was offered to William Sumner Appleton for the Society for the Preservation of New England Antiquities, but local interest in its preservation sparked its donation instead to the town, which undertook its restoration. It is now administered by the Mansfield Historical Society as a house museum.

The house was listed on the National Register of Historic Places on February 11, 1998.

== See also ==
- National Register of Historic Places listings in Bristol County, Massachusetts
