= Henry Fisher House =

Historic house in Pennsylvania, United States

- U.S. National Register of Historic Places
- Pennsylvania state historical marker
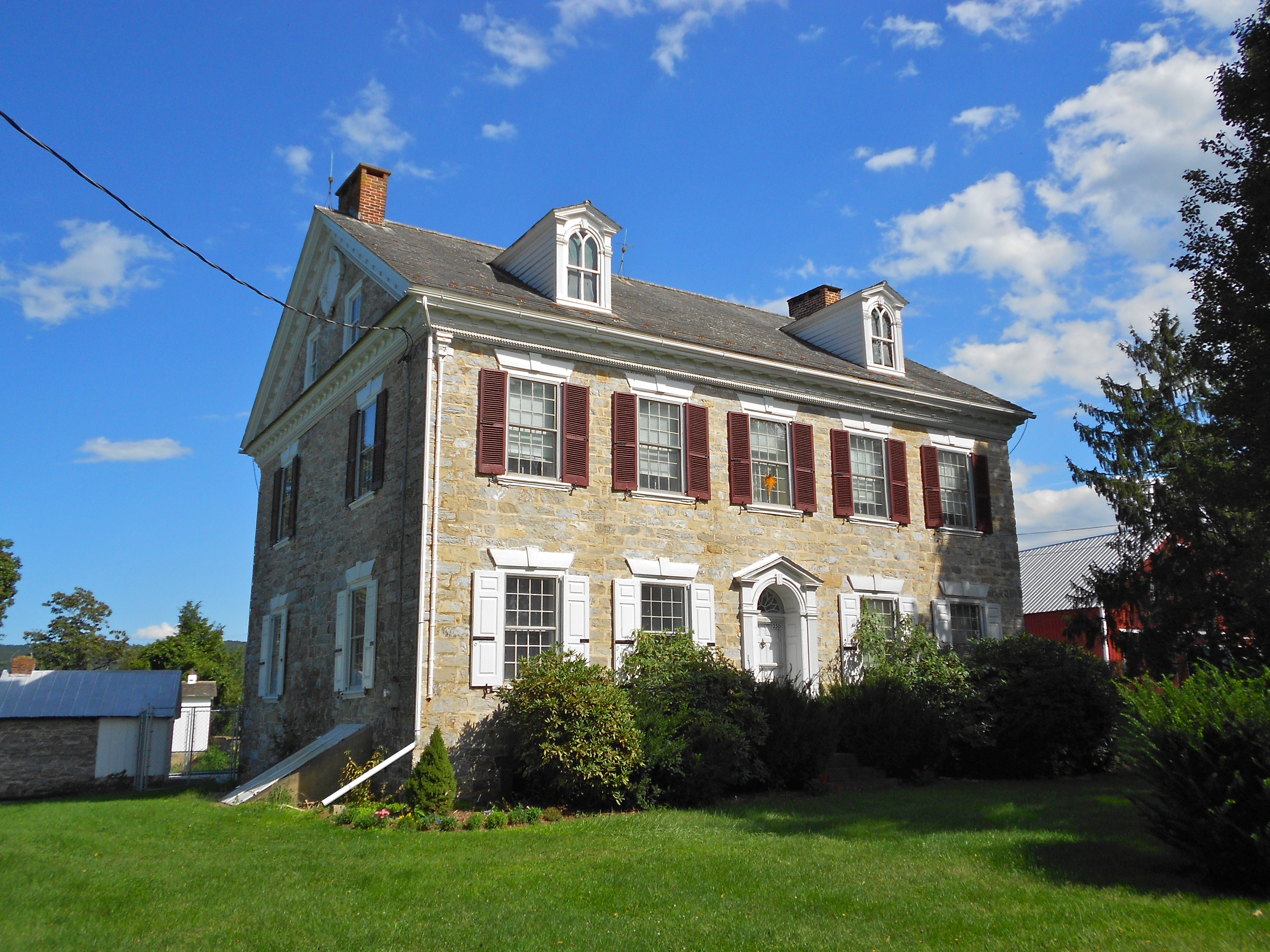

- Location within Pennsylvania Location within the United States
- Location: About 1.25 miles (2.01 km) north of Yellow House on Pennsylvania Route 662, Oley Township, Pennsylvania
- Coordinates: 40°20′27″N 75°45′40″W
- Area: less than one acre
- Built: 1798–1801
- Built by: Gottlieb Drexel
- Architectural style: Georgian, Federal, Germanic
- NRHP reference No.: 73001591

Significant dates
- Added to NRHP: June 4, 1973
- Designated PHMC: August 28, 1948

The Henry Fisher House is an historic home that is located in Oley Township, Berks County, Pennsylvania, United States.

It was listed on the National Register of Historic Places in 1973.

== History and architectural features ==
This historic structure was built between 1798 and 1801, and is a 2 1/2-story, five-bay by two-bay, limestone dwelling with a steeply pitched gable roof. It has a two-story, rear kitchen addition with a flat roof. The main house has a Georgian center hall plan. The Fisher family has lived in the house since it was completed.

It was listed on the National Register of Historic Places in 1973.

== Gallery ==
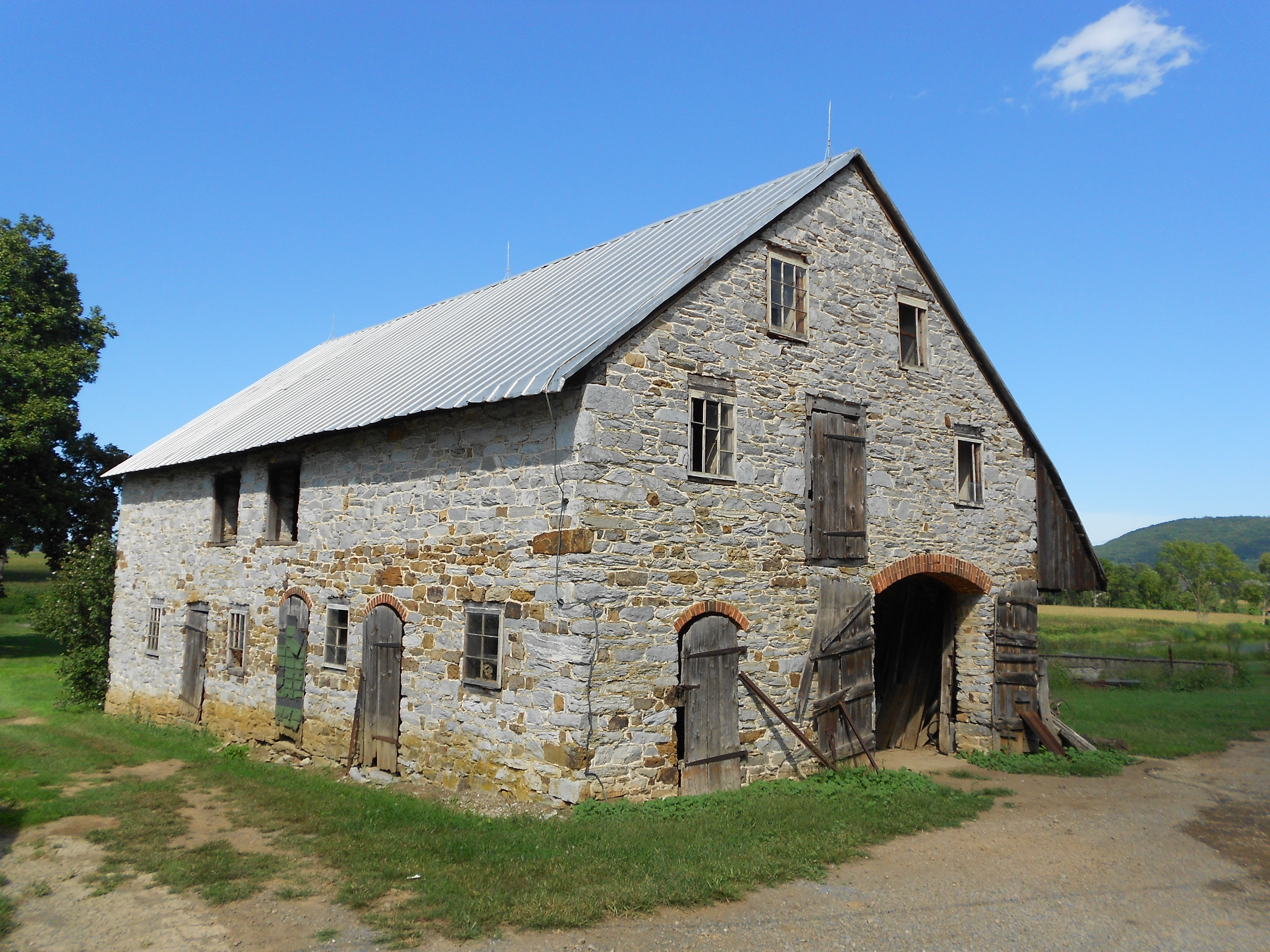
Barn c. 1740

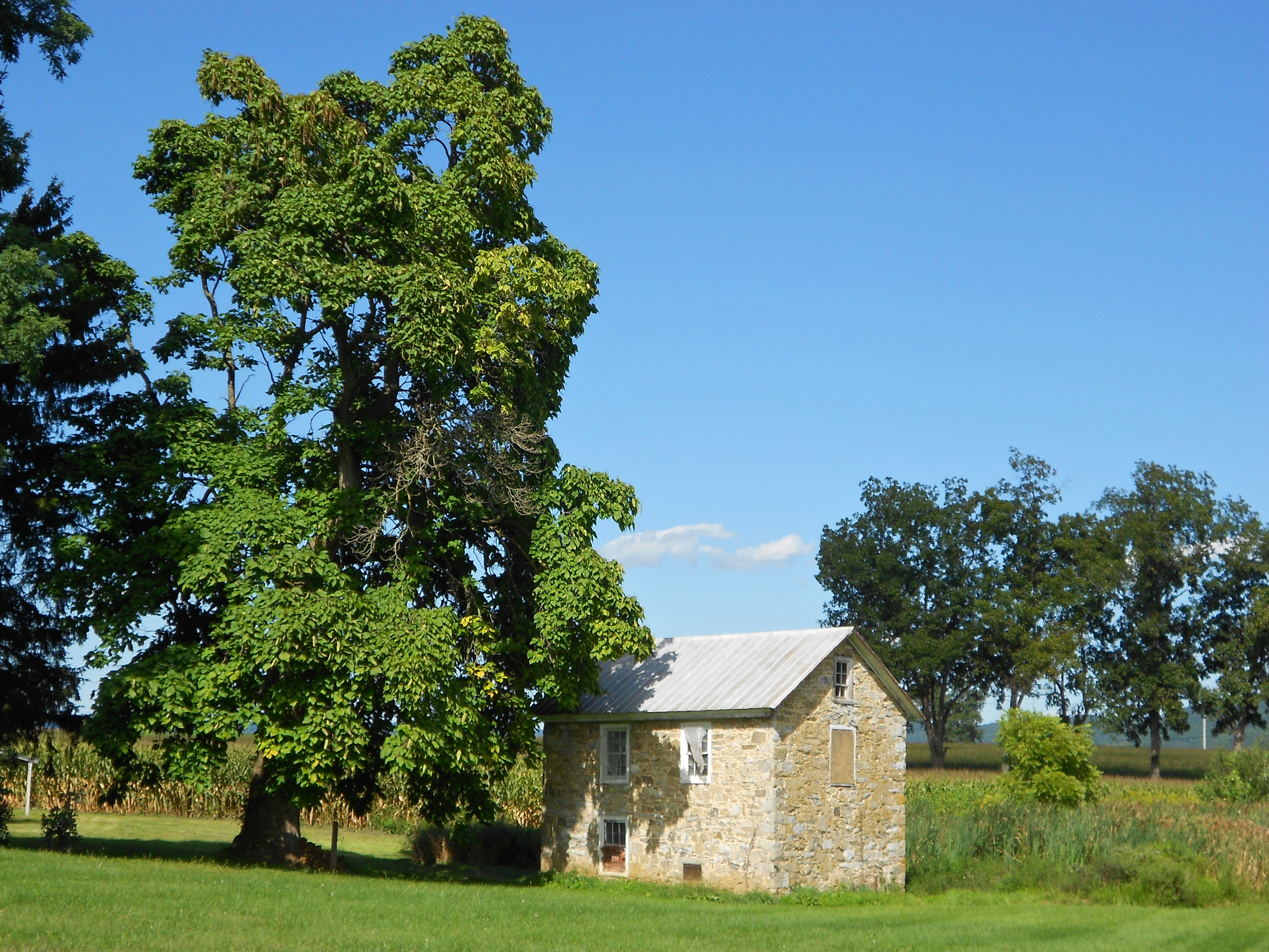
Farm outbuilding
