= James M. Fisher House =

- U.S. National Register of Historic Places
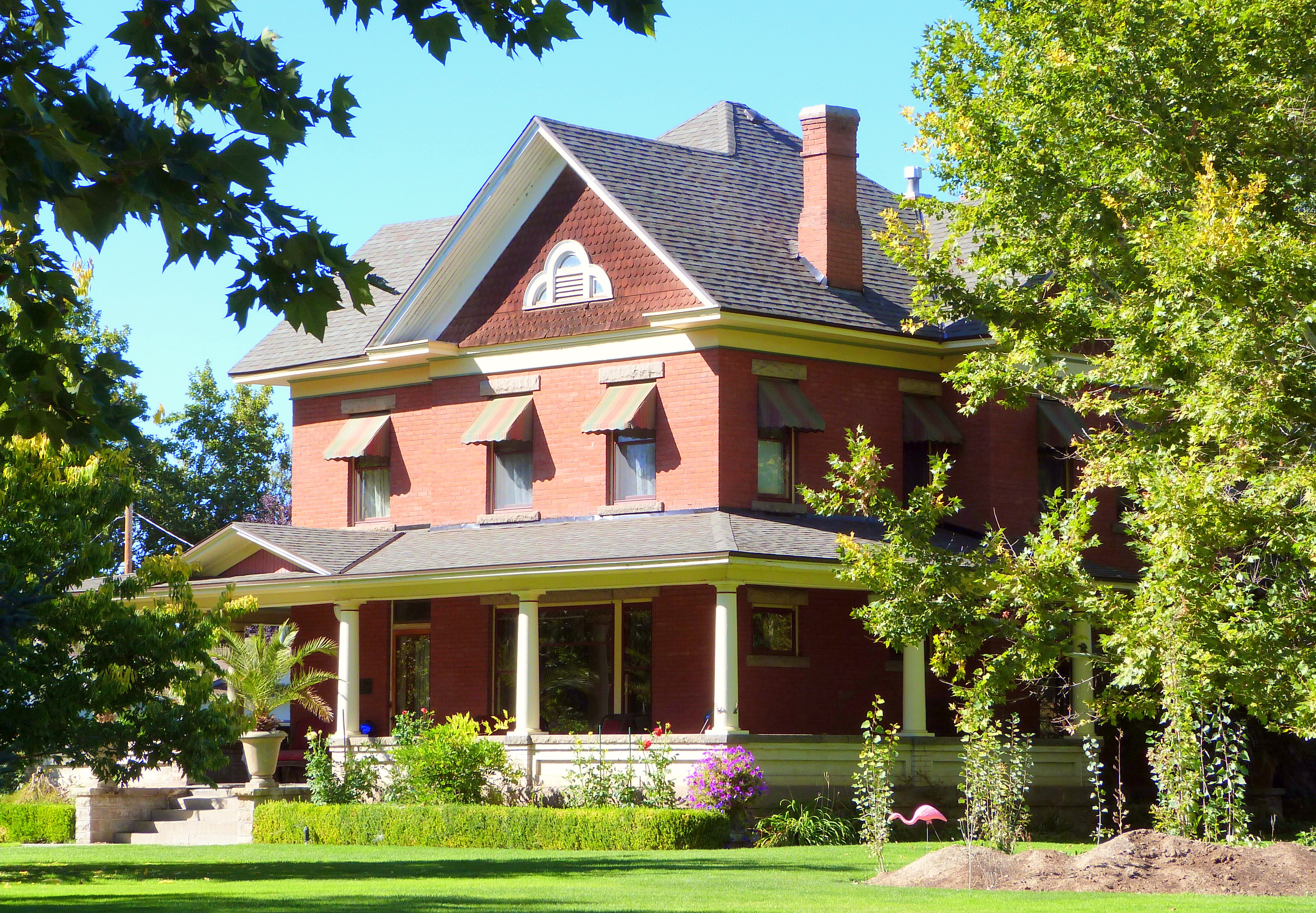

- Location within Idaho Location within the United States
- Location: 598 Pioneer Rd., Weiser, Idaho
- Coordinates: 44°15′12″N 116°58′37″W
- Area: less than one acre
- Built: 1908
- Architect: H.W. Bond & Co.
- Architectural style: Colonial Revival, Queen Anne
- NRHP reference No.: 86002146
- Added to NRHP: September 4, 1986

The James M. Fisher House, at 598 Pioneer Rd. in Weiser, Idaho, United States, was built in 1908. It was listed on the National Register of Historic Places in 1986.

It is a red brick house with sandstone lintels and sills. It was designed by architects H.W. Bond & Co.
