= Bushnell-Fisher House =

Historic building in Eagle, Idaho

- Bushnell--Fisher House
- U.S. National Register of Historic Places
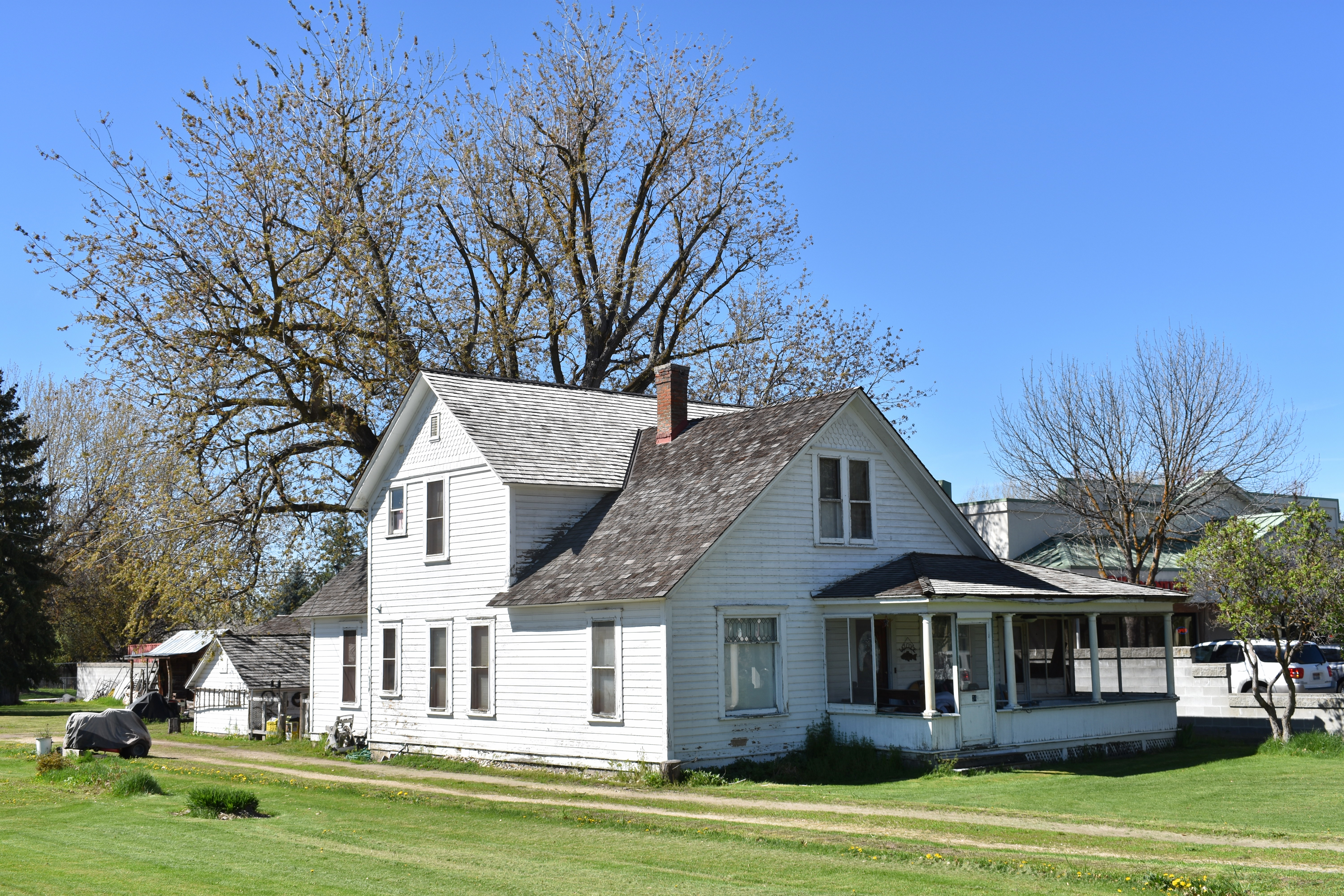
- The Bushnell-Fisher House in 2019

- Location within Idaho Location within the United States
- Location: 349 W. State St., Eagle, Idaho
- Coordinates: 43.6947334°N 116.3589258°W
- Area: less than one acre
- Built: 1909
- NRHP reference No.: 11000777
- Added to NRHP: November 2, 2011

The Bushnell-Fisher House in Eagle, Idaho, is a 1 1/2-story Queen Anne house constructed in 1909. A front facing gable features decorative shingles above dormer windows, and left and right side gables are more fully decorated. Turned columns support an off center porch with hip roof. The house was added to the National Register of Historic Places in 2011.

== History ==
Orlando H. and Ella (Ackley) Bushnell may have been original occupants of the house. The Bushnells were married in 1872 in Buffalo, Minnesota, a town platted by Ella Bushnell's father, Amassa Ackley, in 1856. The Bushnells arrived in Idaho in 1903 and settled in Payette. In 1909 the Bushnells moved to Eagle, where their daughter and her husband, Mary and C.F. Judson, had settled. Orlando Bushnell died at the house in 1911. Ella (Ellen) Bushnell died the following year. Ella Bushnell's mother, Mary Ackley, died at the house four weeks after the death of her daughter.

In 1918 the Bushnells' second daughter, Elizabeth Bushnell, sold the house to Ella Fisher, widow of Eagle pioneer George Fisher, who died in 1909.

Ella Fisher died at the house in 1937. She left 12 children, 45 grandchildren, and 13 great grandchildren. Ownership of the Bushnell-Fisher House passed to her youngest son, Earl Fisher.
