= Cloyd's Creek Presbyterian Church =

Historic church in Tennessee, United States

- U.S. National Register of Historic Places
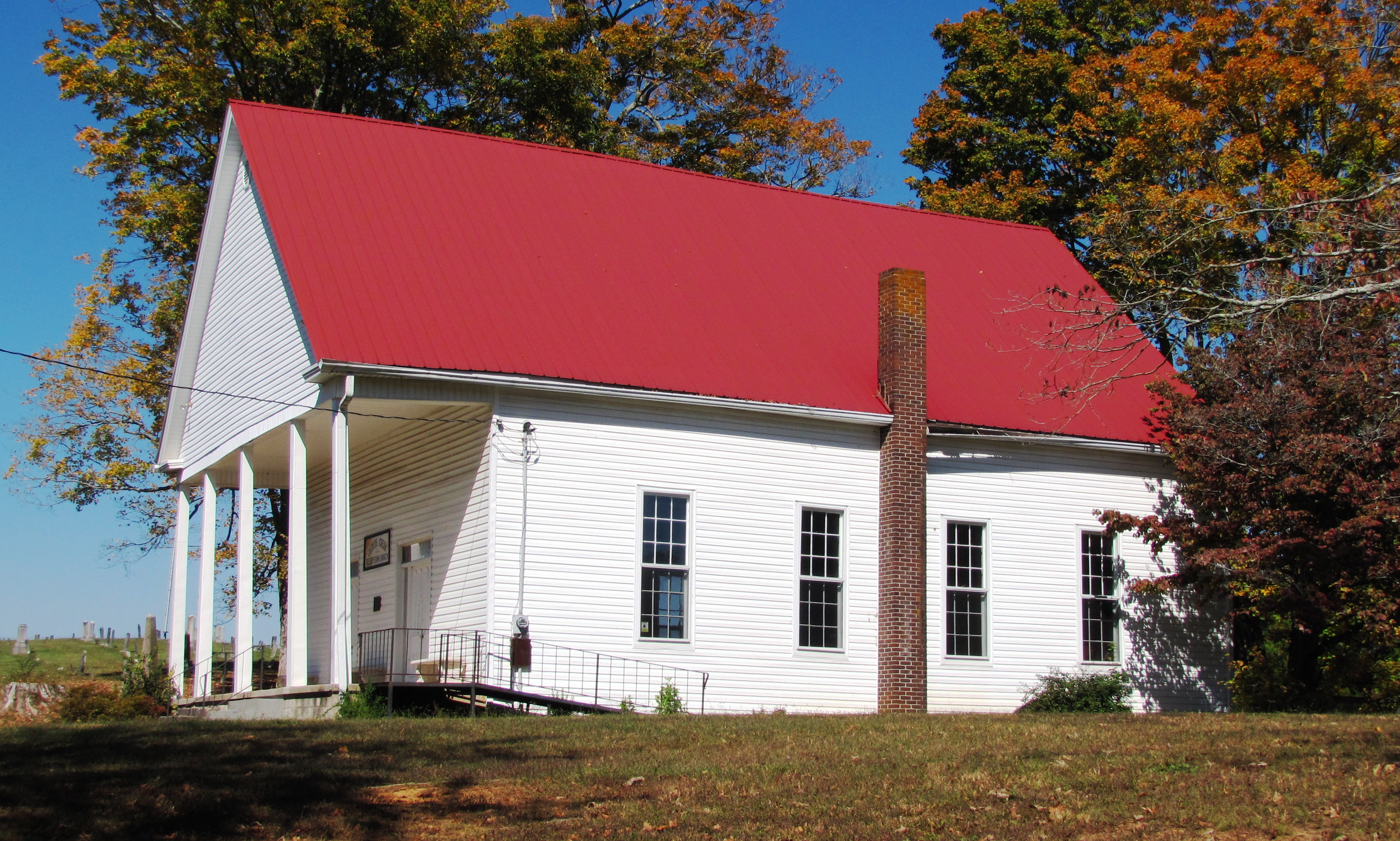

- Location within Tennessee Location within the United States
- Nearest city: Greenback, Tennessee
- Coordinates: 35°41′52″N 84°9′37″W
- Area: less than one acre
- Built: 1872
- Architectural style: Greek Revival
- MPS: Blount County MPS
- NRHP reference No.: 89000873
- Added to NRHP: July 25, 1989

Cloyd's Creek Presbyterian Church is a historic church in Greenback, Tennessee.

Its Greek Revival building was completed in 1872, replacing an older log building. It is a gable-front frame building and has a full-width portico with Doric columns on its main facade. It is the only 19th-century Greek Revival church in Blount County and was added to the National Register of Historic Places in 1989.
