= Morningside (Maryville, Tennessee) =

Historic house in Tennessee, United States

- U.S. National Register of Historic Places
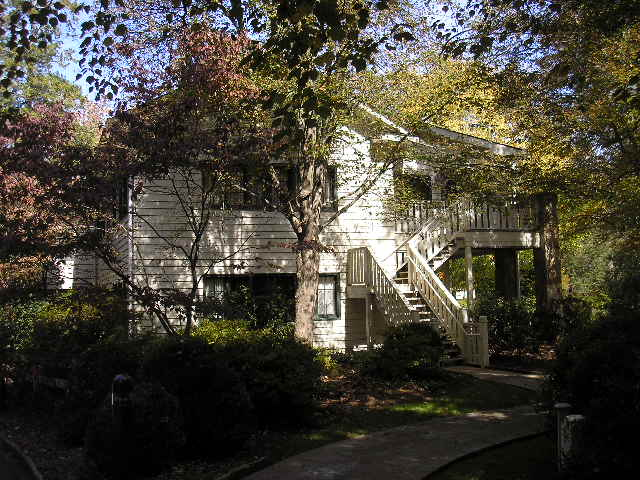
- Morningside in 2015

- Location within Tennessee Location within the United States
- Location: Maryville College campus, Maryville, Tennessee
- Coordinates: 35°44′45″N 83°57′37″W
- Area: 5 acres (2.0 ha)
- Built: 1932; 94 years ago
- Architect: Mrs. John Walker
- Architectural style: Classical Revival
- MPS: Blount County MPS
- NRHP reference No.: 89000904
- Added to NRHP: July 25, 1989

Morningside is a historic house in Maryville, Tennessee, U.S.. It was built in 1932 for Mrs John Walker, whose sister was married to Dr. W. P. Stevenson, the chaplain of Maryville College. It was designed in the Classical Revival architectural style. Mrs Walker willed it to Maryville College when she died in 1950, and it was used as the college president's house. Later, the college sold it to Dr. Lloyd Langston, but they bought it back when he died. It has been listed on the National Register of Historic Places since July 25, 1989.
