= David Jones House (Tuckaleechee Pike, Maryville, Tennessee) =

Historic house in Tennessee, United States

- U.S. National Register of Historic Places
- Location within Tennessee Location within the United States
- Location: 720 Tuckaleechee Pike, Maryville, Tennessee
- Coordinates: 35°45′19″N 83°57′42″W
- Built: 1887; 139 years ago
- Built by: David Jones
- Architectural style: Second Empire
- NRHP reference No.: 82004840
- Added to NRHP: August 26, 1982

The David Jones House in Maryville, Tennessee, also known as the George Burchfield House, is a Second Empire style house built in 1887. It was built by Maryville brick-maker and builder David Jones.

The house is Blount County's only extant example of a residence built in the Second Empire style. It has a straight-sided mansard roof and prominent stone quoining.

It was listed on the National Register of Historic Places in 1982.

Jones also built the NRHP-listed David Jones House on High Street.
