= Fisher–Zugelder House and Smith Cottage =

- U.S. National Register of Historic Places
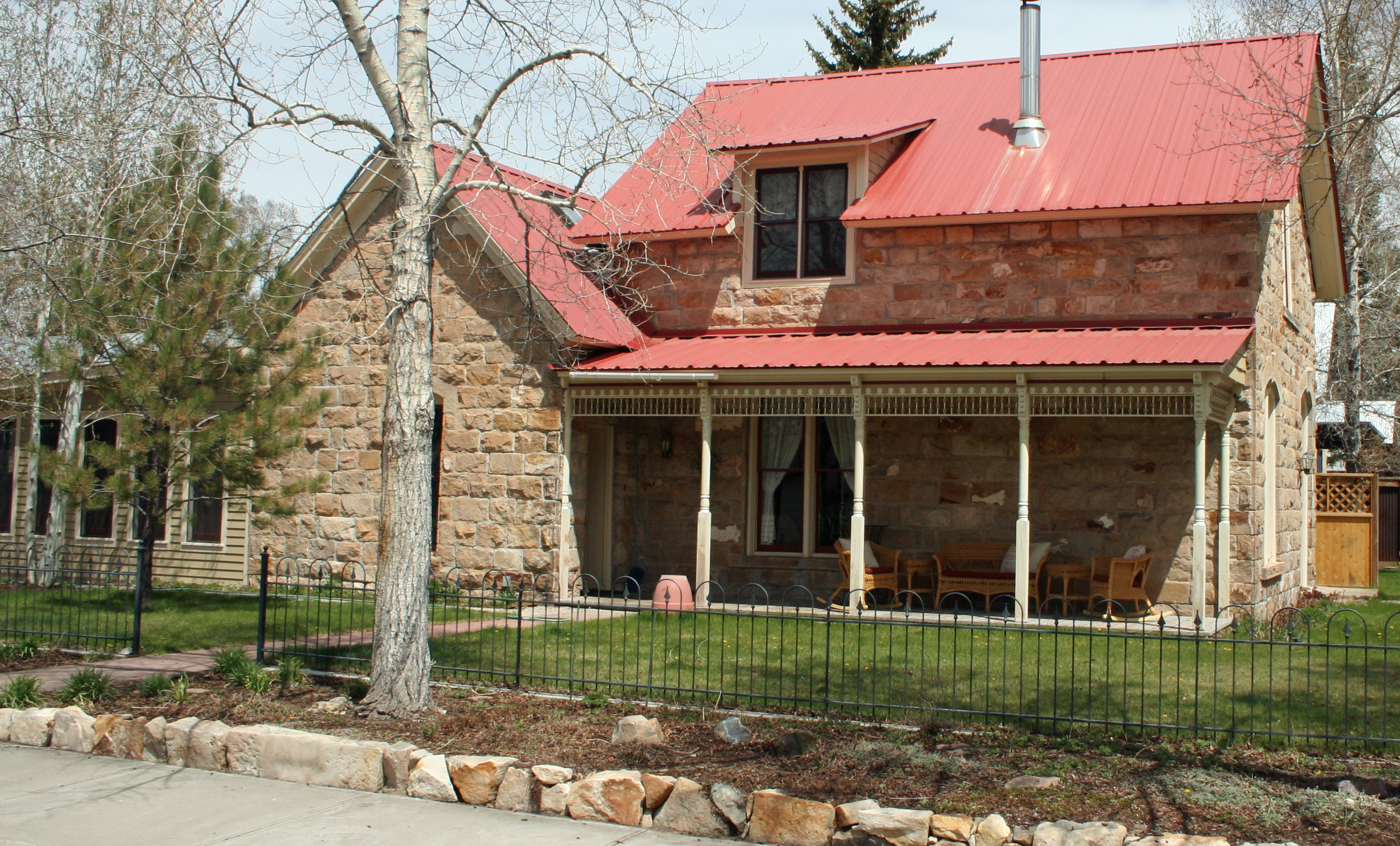
- Fisher–Zugelder House

- Location within Colorado
- Location: 601 N. Wisconsin St., Gunnison, Colorado
- Coordinates: 38°33′00″N 106°55′41″W
- Area: 0.2 acres (0.081 ha)
- Built: 1880
- Built by: Zugelder, Fredrick
- Architectural style: Transitional Vernacular
- NRHP reference No.: 84000853
- Added to NRHP: January 5, 1984

The Fisher–Zugelder House and Smith Cottage, at 601 N. Wisconsin St. in Gunnison, Colorado, are two houses listed together on the National Register of Historic Places in 1984.

The two houses, built during 1880–81, were the first stone houses in Gunnison, at the cusp of the town's development out of the camp phase, in the typical Colorado mining town development phases (exploration, settlement, camp, and town). The camp phase was short, from c.1879 into 1881, as tents and temporary structures were replaced by frame structures, supported by sawmill operations. The town organized formally in January 1880.

In 1880 David Fisher opened quarrying of sandstone, using deposits along the Gunnison River. He chose to use this material for his own home, and contracted with stonemason Frederick Zugelder to build these.

The Fisher–Zugelder House is a two-story, gabled sandstone house with an irregular "L" plan. The Smith Cottage is a one-story gabled sandstone building, 18 by 25 feet (5.5 m × 7.6 m) in plan. Walls are consistently 18 inches (46 cm) thick, built of two layers with dead-air space between. The style is termed "transitional vernacular".
