= Henry N. Fisher House =

Historic house in Massachusetts, United States

- U.S. National Register of Historic Places
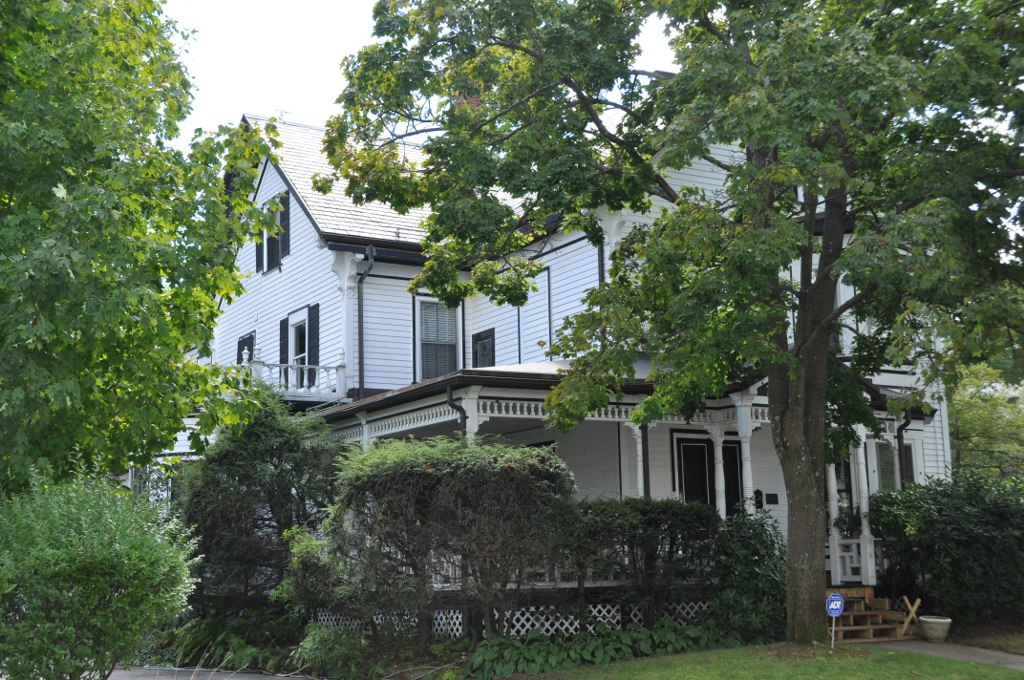

- Location within Massachusetts Location within the United States
- Location: 120 Crescent St., Waltham, Massachusetts
- Coordinates: 42°22′10″N 71°14′27.8″W
- Built: 1881
- Architectural style: Queen Anne
- MPS: Waltham MRA
- NRHP reference No.: 89001577
- Added to NRHP: September 28, 1989

The Henry N. Fisher House is a historic house at 120 Crescent Street in Waltham, Massachusetts. It is a 2 1/2-story wood-frame structure, with the asymmetrical massing typical of Queen Anne houses. It has a wraparound porch with turned posts, lattice railing, and a sunburst motif in the gabled pediment above the steps. The interior has well-preserved woodwork and marble fireplaces.

== History ==
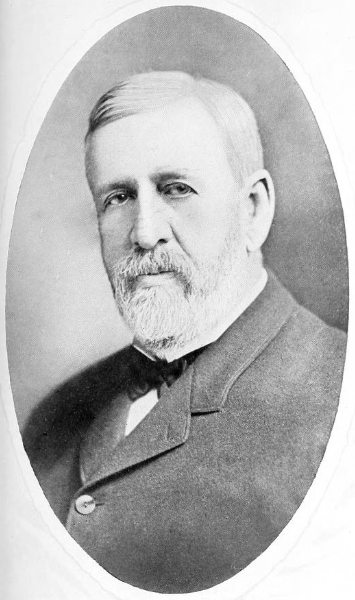
Henry N. Fisher

The house was built c. 1881–86, and is a well-preserved Queen Anne Victorian on the city's south side. It was home for many years to Henry N. Fisher, who served as city mayor in the late 1880s, and was a foreman at the Waltham Watch Company.

The house was listed on the National Register of Historic Places in 1989.

== See also ==
- National Register of Historic Places listings in Waltham, Massachusetts
