= A.J. Fisher House =

Historic house in Tennessee, United States

- A. J. Fisher House
- U.S. National Register of Historic Places
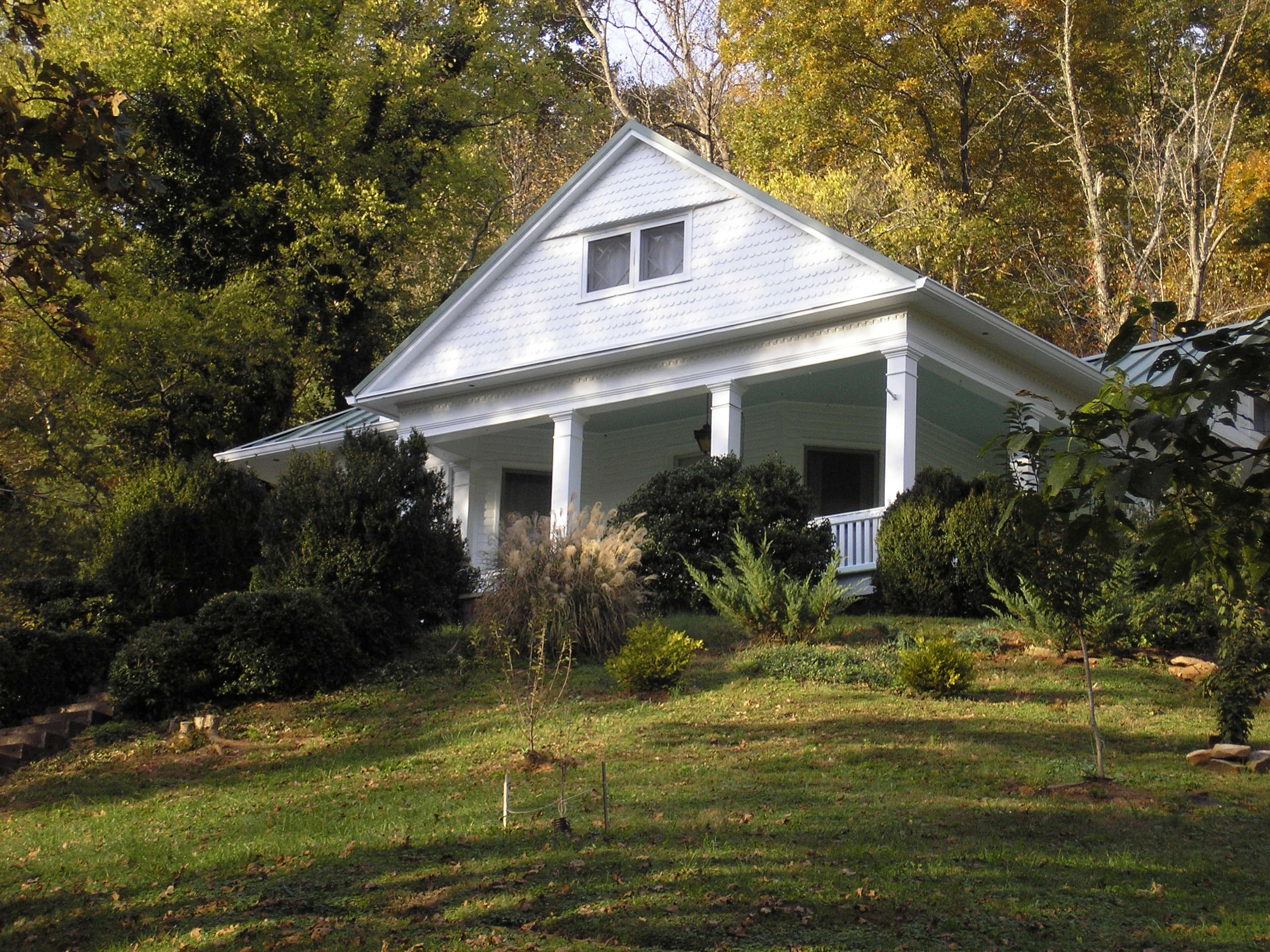
- The A.J. Fisher in 2015

- Location within Tennessee Location within the United States
- Location: Old Walland Hwy., Walland, Tennessee
- Coordinates: 35°43′48″N 83°48′50″W
- Area: 1 acre (0.40 ha)
- Architectural style: Colonial Revival, Queen Anne
- MPS: Blount County MPS
- NRHP reference No.: 89000877
- Added to NRHP: July 25, 1989

The A.J. Fisher House is a historic house in Walland, Tennessee, U.S.. It was built circa 1902 for the Schlosser Leather Company. It was designed in the Colonial Revival and Queen Anne architectural styles. From 1902 to 1922, the first manager of the Schlosser Leather Company, A.J. Fisher, lived in the house. It has been listed on the National Register of Historic Places since July 25, 1989.

The house reflects early 20th-century residential architecture commonly associated with industrial company managers in small American towns.
