= Fisher House (Kalispell, Montana) =

Historic house in Montana, United States

- U.S. National Register of Historic Places
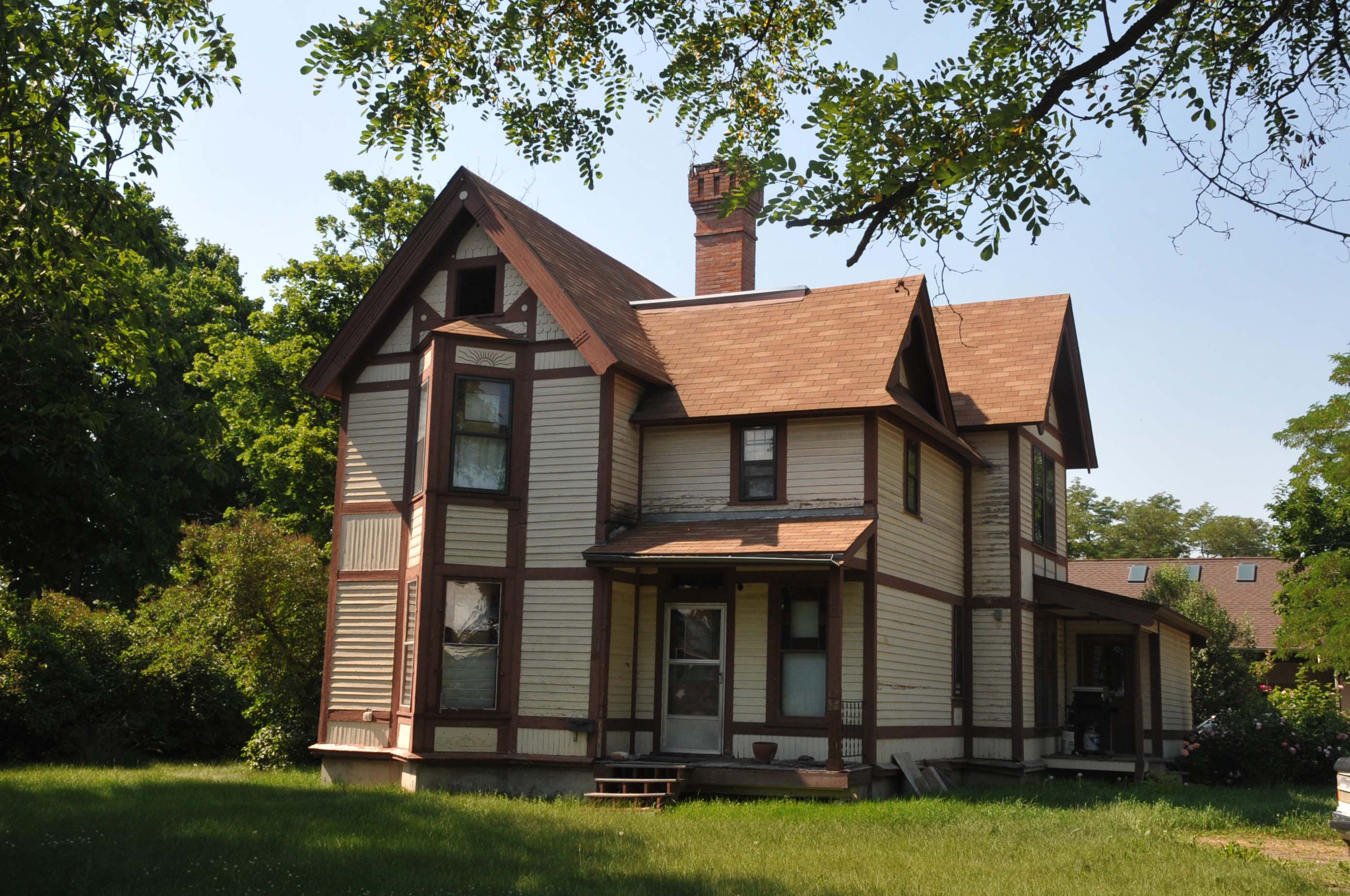
- The Fisher House in 2013

- Location within Montana Location within the United States
- Location: 441 Second Street West, Kalispell, Montana
- Coordinates: 48°11′45″N 114°19′5″W
- Area: less than one acre
- Built: 1892
- Architectural style: Stick/eastlake
- MPS: Kalispell MPS
- NRHP reference No.: 94000884
- Added to NRHP: August 25, 1994

The Fisher House is a historic house in Kalispell, Montana, U.S.. It was built in 1892 for Reverend George McVey Fisher, a Presbyterian minister, his wife Mary Swaney, and their six children. It was designed in the Stick/Eastlake architectural style. From 1941 to the 1980s, it was owned by their daughter Mary and her husband James Heller. It has been listed on the National Register of Historic Places since August 25, 1994.
