= Thaddeus Fisher House =

Historic building in Portland, Oregon, U.S.

- U.S. National Register of Historic Places
- Portland Historic Landmark
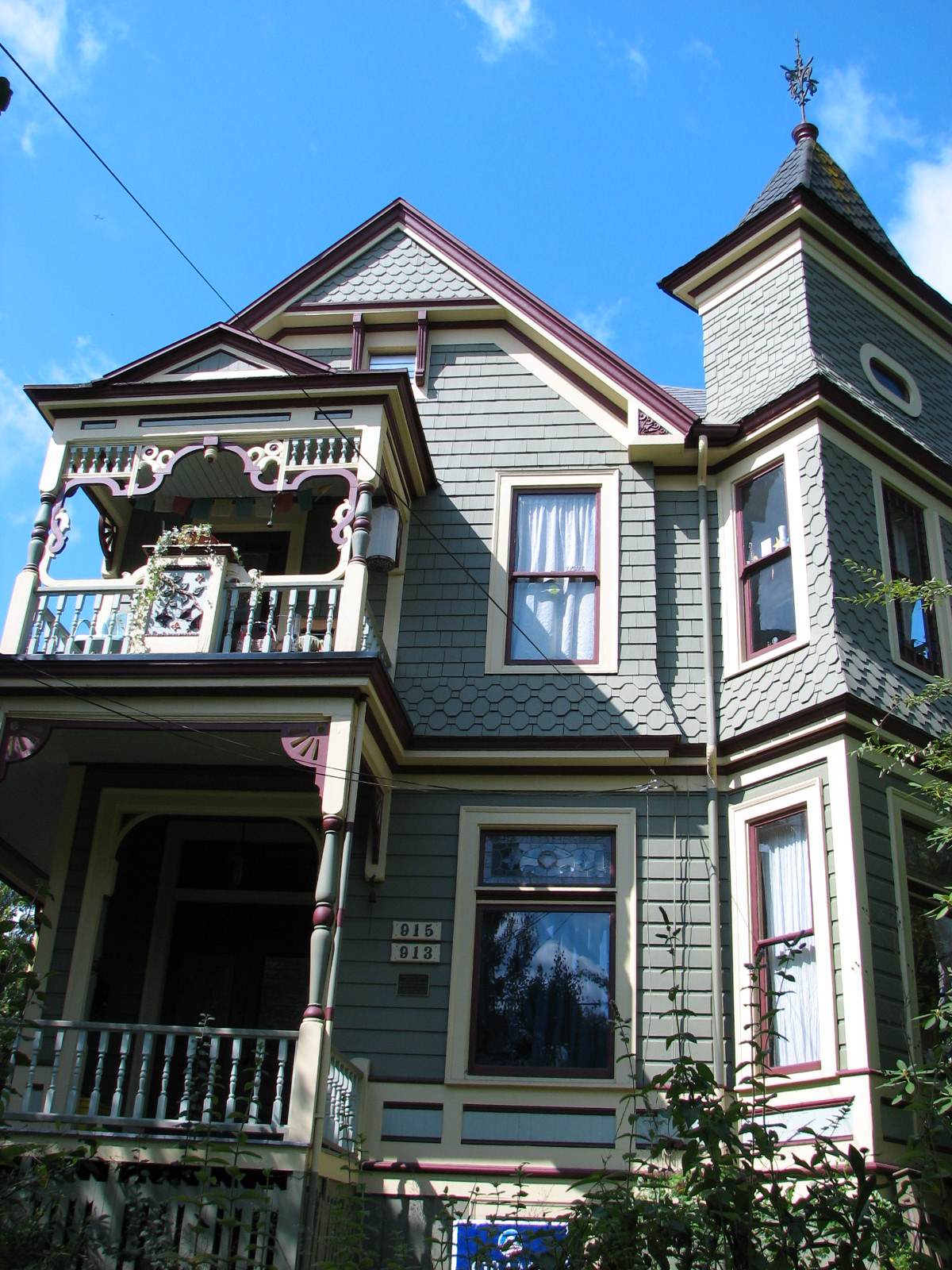
- Thaddeus Fisher House in 2008
- Location: 913–915 SE 33rd Avenue; Portland, Oregon
- Coordinates: 45°30′58″N 122°37′53″W
- Built: 1892
- Architectural style: Queen Anne
- MPS: Portland Eastside MPS
- NRHP reference No.: 89000092
- Added to NRHP: March 8, 1989

The Thaddeus Fisher House is a house in southeast Portland, Oregon, United States, listed on the National Register of Historic Places.

== See also ==
- National Register of Historic Places listings in Southeast Portland, Oregon
