= Lewis M. Fisher House =

Historic house in Iowa, United States

- Formerly listed on the U.S. National Register of Historic Places
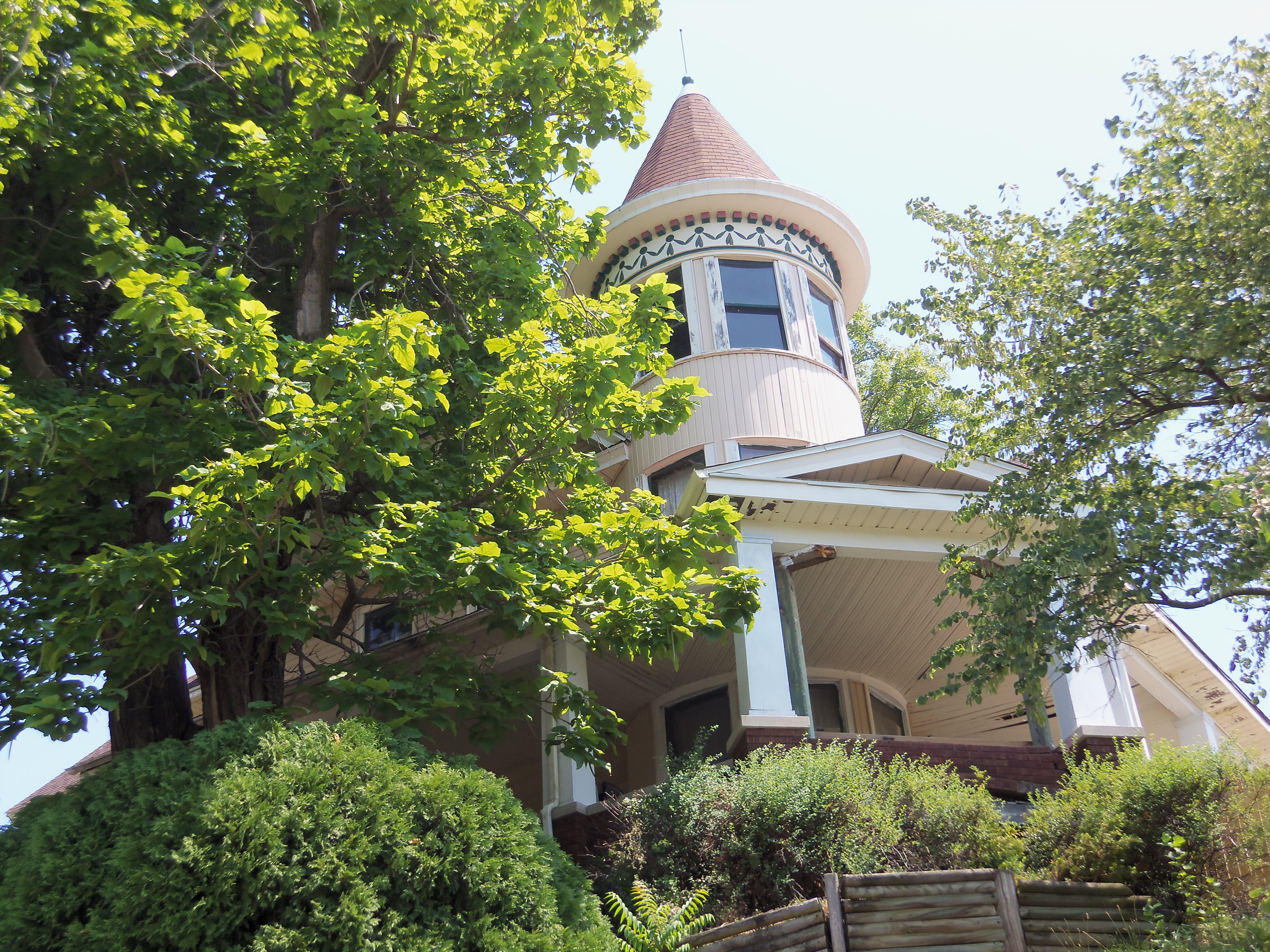

- Location within Iowa Location within the United States
- Location: 1003 Arlington Ave. Davenport, Iowa
- Coordinates: 41°31′49″N 90°33′43″W
- Area: 1 acre (0.40 ha)
- Built: 1895
- Architectural style: Queen Anne; Colonial Revival
- MPS: Davenport MRA
- NRHP reference No.: 83002432

Significant dates
- Added to NRHP: July 7, 1983
- Removed from NRHP: March 7, 2016

The Lewis M. Fisher House is a historic building located on the east side of Davenport, Iowa, United States. It has been listed on the National Register of Historic Places since 1983.

== Lewis M. Fisher ==
Fisher was born and raised in Clayton County, Iowa where he was educated in the local public schools. His father, Maturin, had been president of the Iowa Senate. He did his undergraduate work in Wisconsin and received a law degree from the State University of Iowa, where he graduated valedictorian of his class. He moved to Davenport where he entered a partnership named Heinz & Fisher. The firm provided legal services, loans, and real estate services. From 1885 to 1891 he served as the city attorney. Fisher married Laura Provost in 1883 and they raised three children. They started living in this house in 1896.

== Architecture ==
The Lewis M. Fisher house sits prominently on a corner lot that features a steep a terrace. The plan and the massing of the house, along with the three-story corner tower, reflects the Queen Anne style. The gable-end pediments and the Palladian window are Neoclassical decorative elements. Combining these elements in a single structure was common of houses built in the late 19th century.
