= David Jones House (High Street, Maryville, Tennessee) =

Historic house in Tennessee, United States

- U.S. National Register of Historic Places
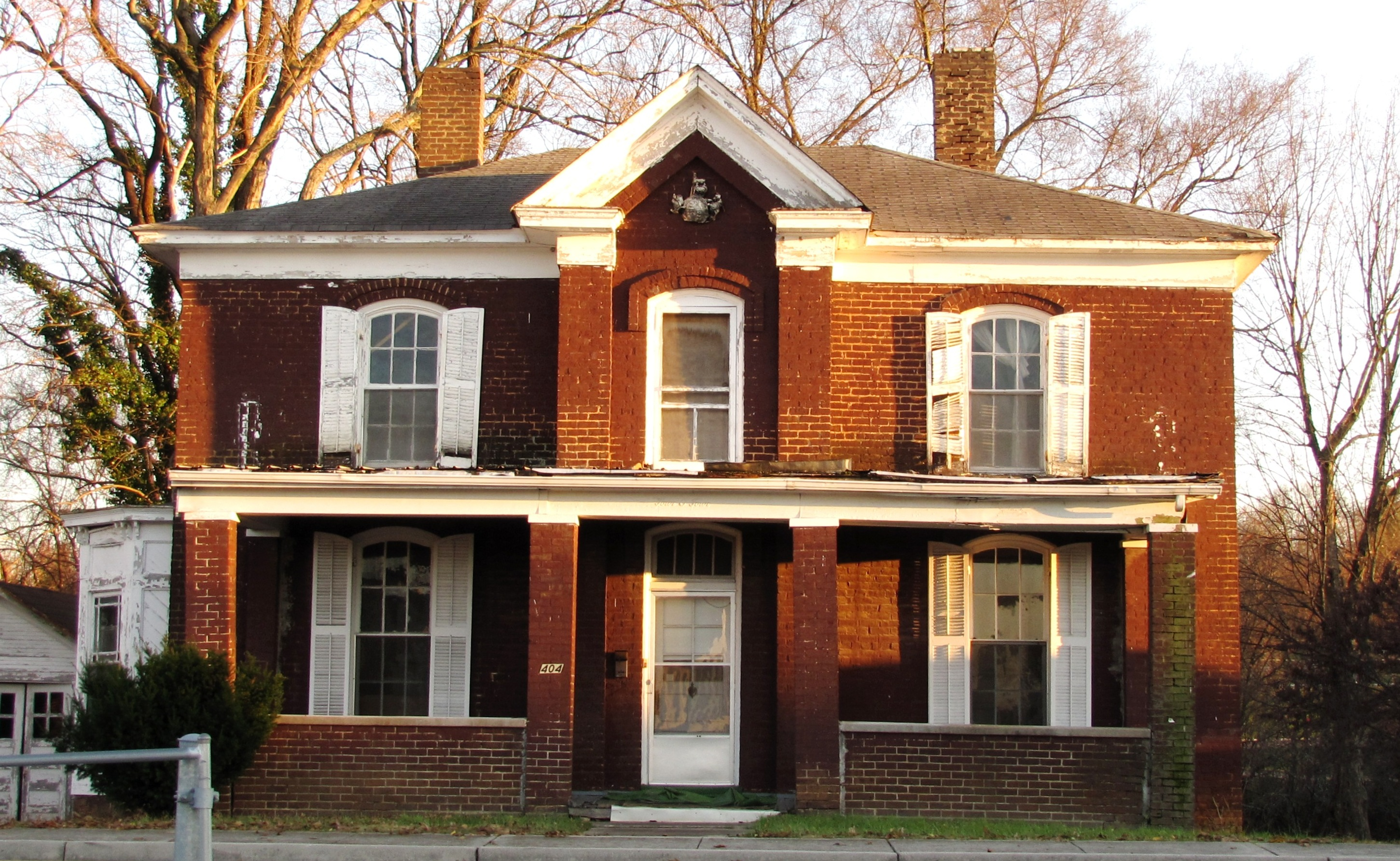

- Location within Tennessee Location within the United States
- Location: 404 High St., Maryville, Tennessee
- Coordinates: 35°45′21″N 83°57′56″W
- Built: 1874
- Architect: Jones, David
- Architectural style: Italianate
- MPS: MPS
- NRHP reference No.: 89000889
- Added to NRHP: July 25, 1989

The David Jones House on High St. in Maryville, Tennessee, also known as the Elmer B. Waller House, was built in 1874 by Maryville builder David Jones. Jones ran a brick company and built numerous brick buildings in Maryville including the Blount County Courthouse (which burned in 1906).

The house is one of two best examples of Italianate architecture, along with the Peter Bartlett House, in Blount County. It was listed on the National Register of Historic Places (NRHP) in 1989.

David Jones also built the county's only Second Empire style house on Broadway (at 720 Tuckaleechee Pike), which is also NRHP-listed.

== See also ==
- David Jones House (Tuckaleechee Pike, Maryville, Tennessee), also NRHP-listed in Maryville
