= Wildwood, Tennessee =

Wildwood
- CDP
- Location within Tennessee Location within the United States
- Coordinates: 35°47′59″N 83°52′07″W
- Country: United States
- State: Tennessee
- County: Blount

Area
  - Total: 2.49 sq mi (6.44 km^{2})
  - Land: 2.49 sq mi (6.44 km^{2})
  - Water: 0 sq mi (0.00 km^{2})
- Elevation: 958 ft (292 m)

Population (2020)
  - Total: 1,157
  - Density: 465.2/sq mi (179.61/km^{2})
- Time zone: UTC-5 (Eastern (EST))
  - Summer (DST): UTC-4 (EDT)
- ZIP code: 37804
- Area code: 865
- GNIS feature ID: 2586086

Wildwood is an unincorporated community and census-designated place (CDP) in Blount County, Tennessee. As of the 2020 census, its population was 1,157.

It is the location of Bethlehem Methodist Church, which is listed on the National Register of Historic Places.

== Demographics ==
Historical population
Census	Pop.	Note	%±
2010	1,098		—
2020	1,157		5.4%
U.S. Decennial Census
