= David Fisher House =

- U.S. National Register of Historic Places
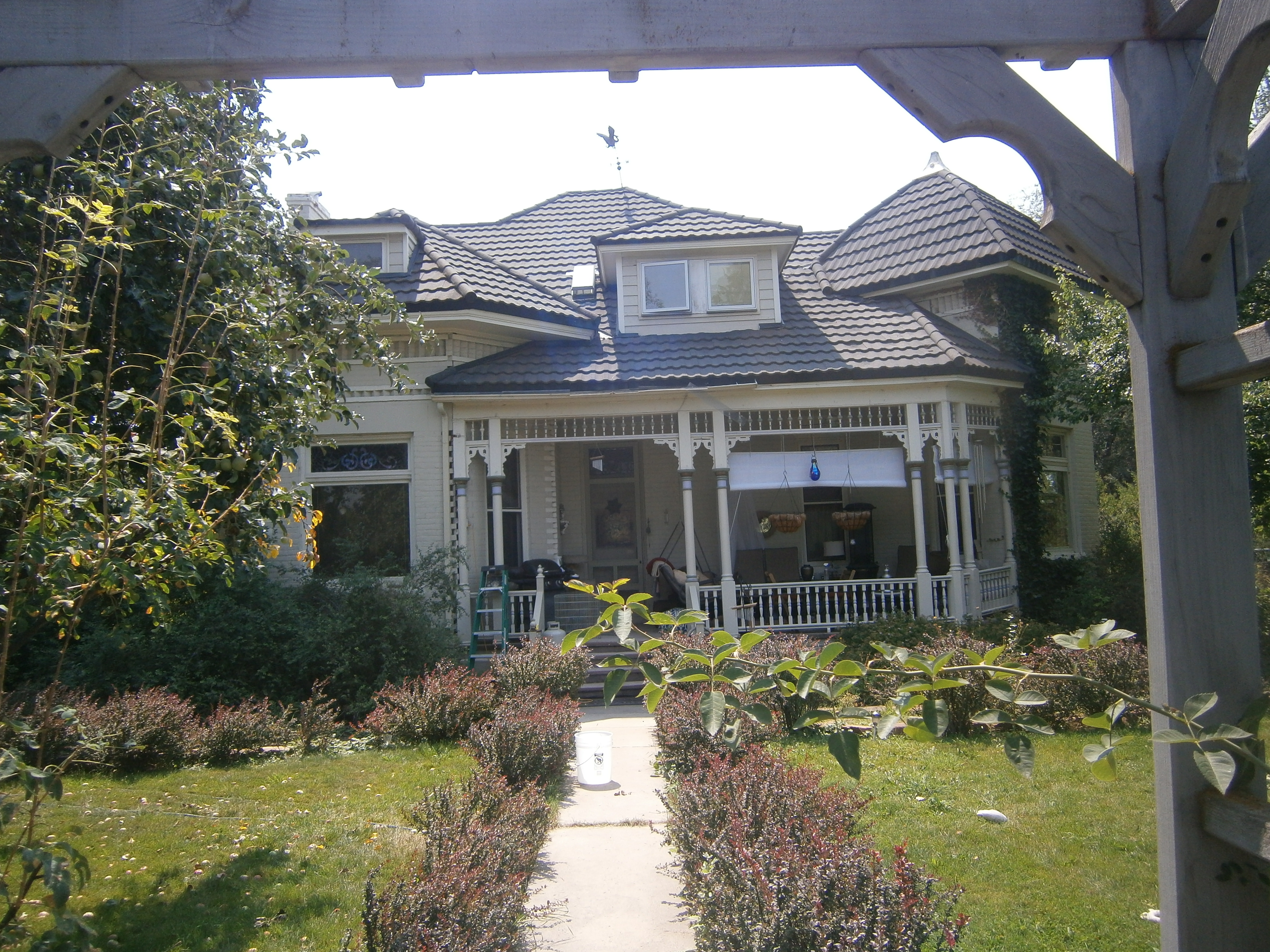

- Location within Utah Location within the United States
- Location: 124 E. 400 South, Heber City, Utah
- Coordinates: 40°30′08″N 111°24′38″W
- Area: less than one acre
- Built: 1892
- Architectural style: Late Victorian, Stick/eastlake, Queen Anne
- NRHP reference No.: 80003984
- Added to NRHP: April 16, 1980

The David Fisher House, at 124 E. 400 South in Heber City, Utah, was built in 1892 in Queen Anne style. It was listed on the National Register of Historic Places in 1980.

It is a one-and-a-half-story brick house, "one of only a handful of Victorian Houses remaining in Wasatch County."

It was built by David Fisher, born in 1852 in Scotland, who lived in the house until his death in 1915.
