= College Hill Historic District (Maryville, Tennessee) =

Historic district in Tennessee, United States

- Indiana Avenue Historic District
- U.S. National Register of Historic Places
- U.S. Historic district
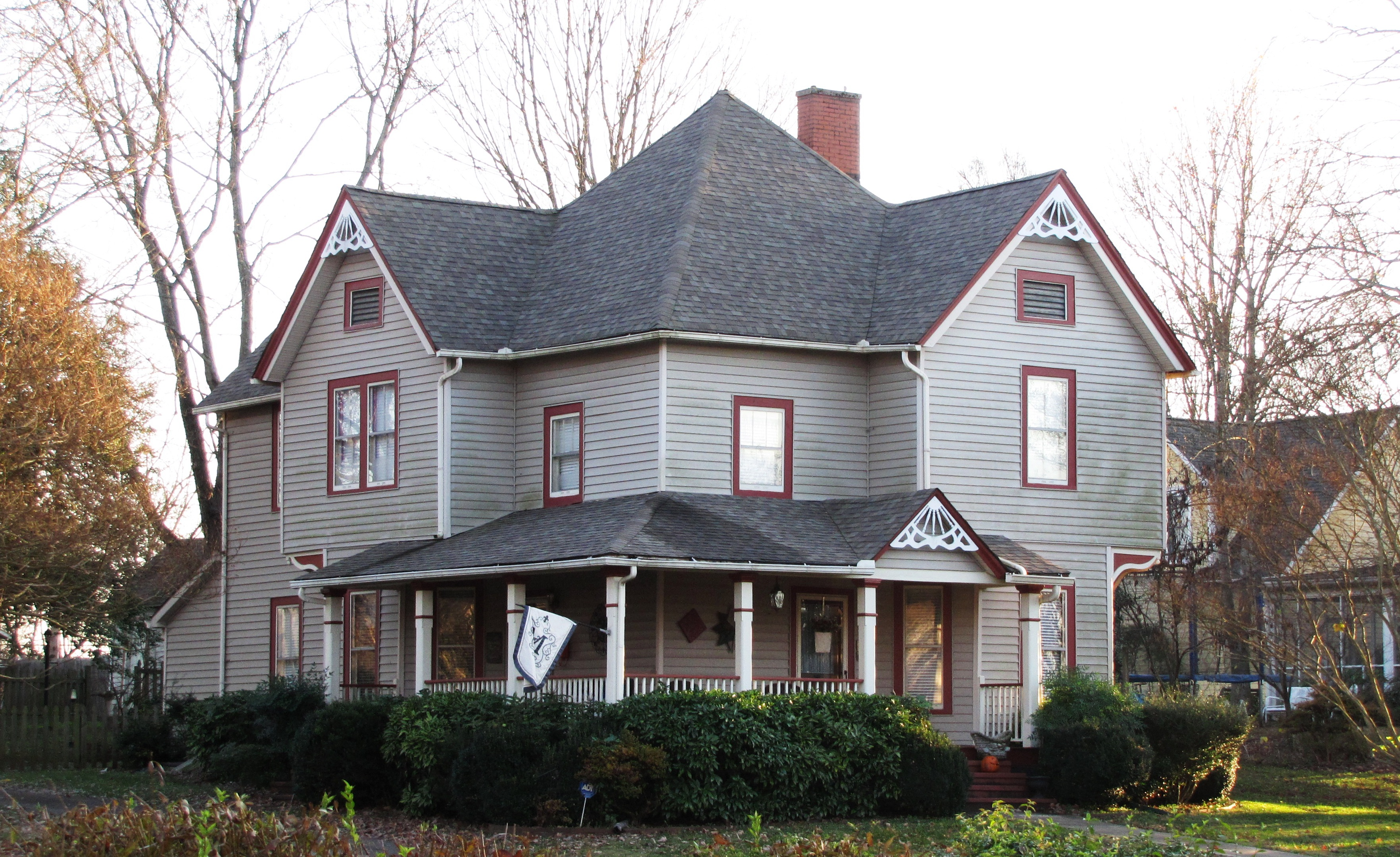
- 216 Indiana Avenue
- Location: Roughly bounded by Goddard St., Court St., Indiana Ave., and Cates St., Maryville, Tennessee
- Area: 33 acres (13 ha)
- Architectural style: Colonial Revival, Bungalow/craftsman, Late Victorian
- MPS: Blount County MPS
- NRHP reference No.: 89001071
- Added to NRHP: August 21, 1989

The College Hill Historic District is a historic neighborhood in Maryville, Tennessee. It is a local historic district; a portion of the area along Indiana Avenue is also listed on the National Register of Historic Places as the Indiana Avenue Historic District.

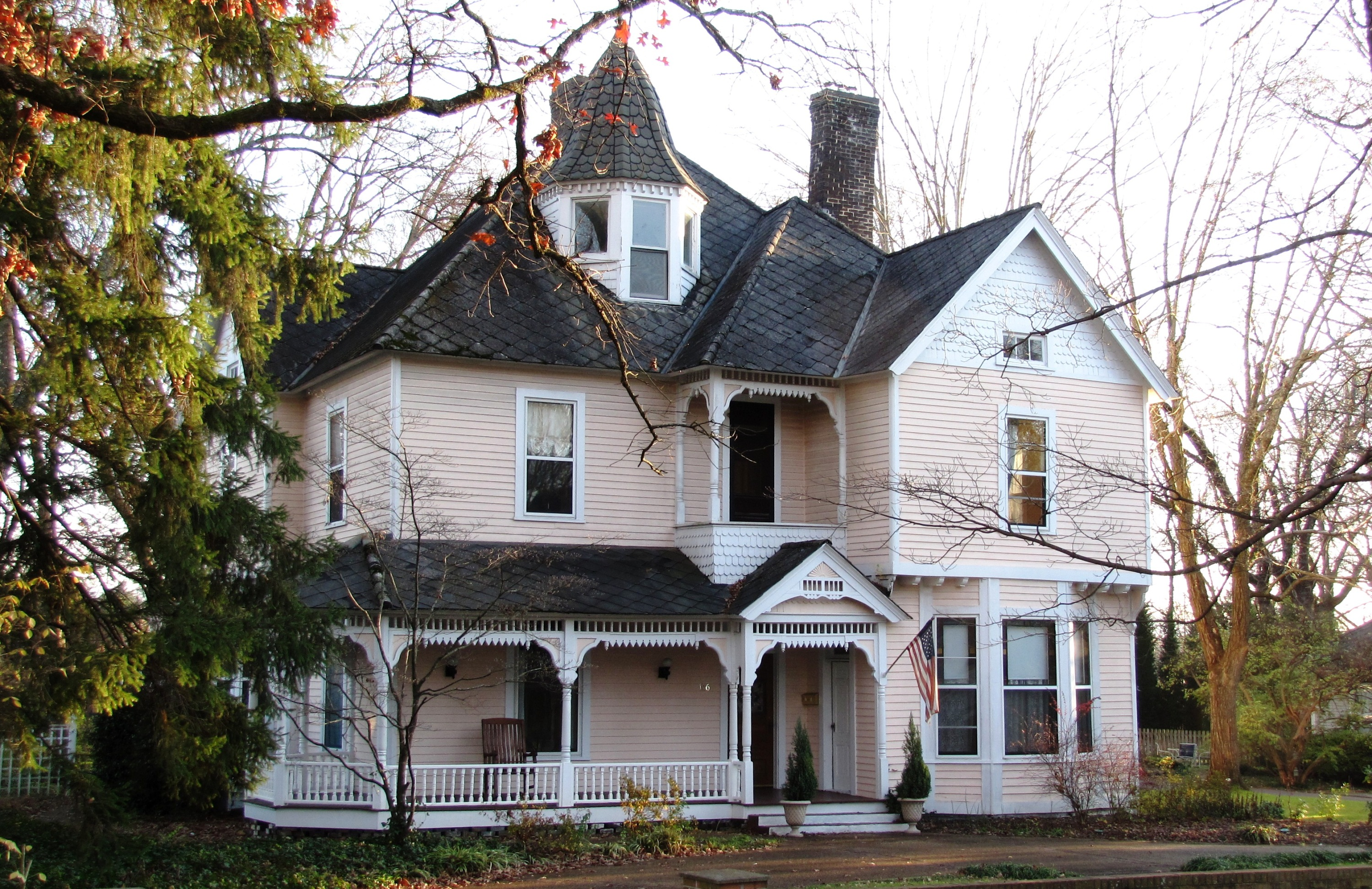
House at 116 Indiana Avenue, designed by George Franklin Barber
