= Fisher Homestead (Lewes, Delaware) =

Historic house in Delaware, United States

- U.S. National Register of Historic Places
- Location within Delaware Location within the United States
- Location: West of Lewes, near Lewes, Delaware
- Coordinates: 38°47′21″N 75°12′23″W
- Built: c. 1850
- Architectural style: Greek Revival
- NRHP reference No.: 80000941
- Added to NRHP: December 11, 1980

Fisher Homestead, also known as Cedarcroft Farm, is a historic home located near Lewes, in Sussex County, Delaware. Dating to around 1850, it is a two-story, single-pile, center-hall plan dwelling with wood pilasters at the corners, designed in the Greek Revival style. It has a gable roof and is sheathed in cedar shingles. It has an original one-story, three bay rear wing, and a two-story wing raised to that height in the early 1900s.

It was added to the National Register of Historic Places in 1980.
