= Fisher Homestead (Cloverport, Kentucky) =

- U.S. National Register of Historic Places
- Location within Kentucky Location within the United States
- Location: U.S. 60, Cloverport, Kentucky
- Coordinates: 37°50′04″N 86°36′48″W
- Area: 2 acres (0.81 ha)
- Built: 1801
- Architectural style: Federal
- MPS: Cloverport MRA
- NRHP reference No.: 83002590
- Added to NRHP: June 21, 1983

The Fisher Homestead, located on U.S. Route 60 in Cloverport, Kentucky, was listed on the National Register of Historic Places in 1983. The listing included three contributing buildings.

The homestead house is Federal in style and was built in c.1801. It is one-and-a-half-stories tall and has a one-story brick ell. The brick is laid in common bond.
