= Adam Fisher Homestead =

Historic home and farm in Pennsylvania, US

- U.S. National Register of Historic Places
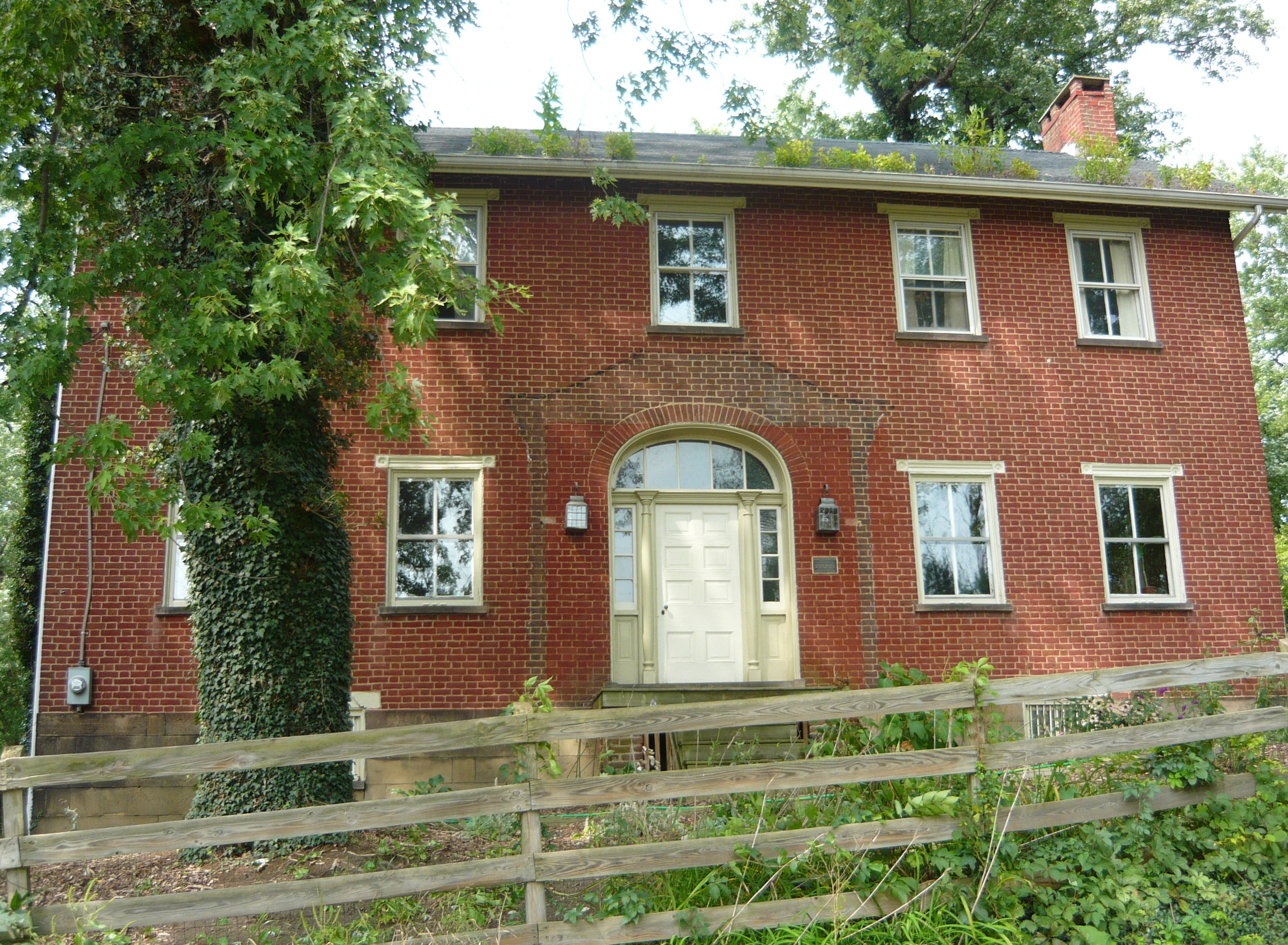
- Adam Fisher Homestead, August 2011

- Location within Pennsylvania Location within the United States
- Location: Brinkerton Rd. near jct. with Mt. Pleasant Rd., Mount Pleasant Township, Pennsylvania
- Coordinates: 40°13′9″N 79°30′10″W
- Area: 3 acres (1.2 ha)
- Built: 1837
- Architectural style: Federal, Vernacular Federal
- NRHP reference No.: 91000230
- Added to NRHP: February 28, 1991

Adam Fisher Homestead, also known as Artuso Farm, is a historic home and farm located in Mount Pleasant Township, Westmoreland County, Pennsylvania. The house was built about 1837, and is a two-story, five bay brick dwelling with a cut sandstone foundation in a vernacular Federal style. The farmstead includes the following contributing outbuildings: a combination smoke-house / bake oven / coal-house, a combination summer kitchen / wash house, and a cooper's shed.

It was added to the National Register of Historic Places in 1991.
