= National Register of Historic Places listings in Washington County, Idaho =

Location of Washington County in Idaho

This is a list of the National Register of Historic Places listings in Washington County, Idaho.

This is intended to be a complete list of the properties and districts on the National Register of Historic Places in Washington County, Idaho, United States. Latitude and longitude coordinates are provided for many National Register properties and districts; these locations may be seen together in a map.

There are 32 properties and districts listed on the National Register in the county. More may be added; properties and districts nationwide are added to the Register weekly.

This National Park Service list is complete through NPS recent listings posted September 25, 2026.

== Current listings ==
| | Name on the Register | Image | Date listed | Location | City or town | Description |
|---|---|---|---|---|---|---|
| 1 | Anderson–Elwell House | Anderson–Elwell House | November 17, 1982 (#82000373) | 547 W. 1st St. 44°14′51″N 116°58′16″W | Weiser | |
| 2 | Baptist Church | Baptist Church | October 7, 1977 (#77000470) | E. Main and 8th Sts. 44°14′45″N 116°57′22″W | Weiser | |
| 3 | Butterfield Livestock Company House | Butterfield Livestock Company House | November 17, 1982 (#82000374) | North of Weiser on Jenkins Creek Rd. 44°15′29″N 116°59′38″W | Weiser | |
| 4 | Cambridge News Office | Cambridge News Office | December 28, 1989 (#89002128) | 155 N. Superior St. 44°34′24″N 116°40′30″W | Cambridge | |
| 5 | Col. C. F. Drake House | Col. C. F. Drake House | January 20, 1978 (#78001104) | 516 E. Main St. 44°14′45″N 116°57′39″W | Weiser | |
| 6 | Edwards–Gillette Barn | Edwards–Gillette Barn | February 19, 2002 (#02000013) | 3059 Rush Creek Rd. 44°35′43″N 116°42′06″W | Cambridge | |
| 7 | James M. Fisher House | James M. Fisher House | September 4, 1986 (#86002146) | 598 Pioneer Rd. 44°15′12″N 116°58′37″W | Weiser | |
| 8 | Thomas C. Galloway House | Thomas C. Galloway House | January 26, 1978 (#78001105) | 1120 E. 2nd St. 44°15′10″N 116°58′00″W | Weiser | |
| 9 | Bernard Haas House | Bernard Haas House | May 22, 1978 (#78001106) | 377 E. Main St. 44°14′43″N 116°57′50″W | Weiser | |
| 10 | Herman Haas House | Herman Haas House | November 17, 1982 (#82000375) | 253 W. Idaho St. 44°14′47″N 116°58′27″W | Weiser | |
| 11 | Institute Canal Company Pump House | Institute Canal Company Pump House | May 8, 2017 (#100000958) | South end of Fairview St. at the Galloway Canal; 44°15′24″N 116°58′12″W | Weiser | |
| 12 | Intermountain Institute | Intermountain Institute | November 1, 1979 (#79000811) | Paddock Ave. 44°15′53″N 116°58′51″W | Weiser | |
| 13 | Jewell Building | Jewell Building | January 18, 1990 (#89002263) | 15 N. Superior St. 44°34′19″N 116°40′36″W | Cambridge | |
| 14 | Knights of Pythias Lodge Hall | Knights of Pythias Lodge Hall | May 13, 1976 (#76000683) | 30 E. Idaho St. 44°14′44″N 116°58′11″W | Weiser | |
| 15 | Kurtz-Van Sicklin House | Kurtz-Van Sicklin House | November 17, 1982 (#82000376) | 253 W. Main St. 44°14′50″N 116°58′25″W | Weiser | |
| 16 | Archie Larsen House | Archie Larsen House | November 17, 1982 (#82000377) | South of Weiser on Larsen Rd. 44°11′43″N 116°56′11″W | Weiser | Building no longer exists. |
| 17 | G. V. Nesbit House | G. V. Nesbit House | November 17, 1982 (#82000378) | 308 W. Liberty St. 44°14′58″N 116°58′23″W | Weiser | |
| 18 | Dr. J. R. Numbers House | Dr. J. R. Numbers House | November 17, 1982 (#82000379) | 240 W. Main St. 44°14′51″N 116°58′23″W | Weiser | |
| 19 | St. Agnes Catholic Church | St. Agnes Catholic Church | July 24, 1978 (#78001107) | 204 E. Liberty St. 44°14′53″N 116°58′00″W | Weiser | |
| 20 | St. Luke's Episcopal Church | St. Luke's Episcopal Church | July 24, 1978 (#78001108) | E. 1st and Liberty Sts. 44°14′53″N 116°58′04″W | Weiser | |
| 21 | Salubria Lodge No. 31 | Salubria Lodge No. 31 | March 9, 1990 (#90000368) | 85 W. Central Blvd. 44°34′23″N 116°40′36″W | Cambridge | |
| 22 | Morris Sommer House | Morris Sommer House | November 17, 1982 (#82000380) | 548 W. 2nd St. 44°14′52″N 116°58′21″W | Weiser | |
| 23 | Mary Elizabeth Sommercamp House | Mary Elizabeth Sommercamp House | November 17, 1982 (#82000381) | 411 W. 3rd St. 44°14′49″N 116°58′28″W | Weiser | |
| 24 | Star Theater | Star Theater | November 30, 1999 (#99001413) | 342 State St. 44°14′43″N 116°58′13″W | Weiser | |
| 25 | Sunnyside School | Sunnyside School | January 23, 2025 (#100011321) | 446 US-95; 44°12′59″N 116°56′20″W | Weiser vicinity | |
| 26 | B. S. Varian House | B. S. Varian House | November 17, 1982 (#82000382) | 241 W. Main St. 44°14′49″N 116°58′24″W | Weiser | |
| 27 | Washington County Courthouse | Washington County Courthouse | September 28, 1987 (#87001602) | E. Court St. 44°14′51″N 116°57′59″W | Weiser | |
| 28 | Benjamin Watlington House | Benjamin Watlington House | April 26, 1991 (#91000458) | 206 W. Court St. 44°14′53″N 116°58′20″W | Weiser | |
| 29 | Weiser High School Gymnasium & Auditorium | | October 1, 2026 (#100013499) | 320 E. Galloway Avenue; 44°15′01″N 116°57′53″W | Weiser | |
| 30 | Weiser Oregon Short Line Railroad Depot | Weiser Oregon Short Line Railroad Depot | February 7, 2007 (#07000006) | 1 State St. 44°14′38″N 116°58′17″W | Weiser | |
| 31 | Weiser Post Office | Weiser Post Office | November 17, 1982 (#82000383) | Main and W. 1st Sts. 44°14′49″N 116°58′17″W | Weiser | |
| 32 | Wilson House | Wilson House | January 6, 2004 (#03001369) | 75 N. 5th St. 44°34′35″N 116°40′55″W | Cambridge | |

== See also ==
- List of National Historic Landmarks in Idaho
- National Register of Historic Places listings in Idaho
