= Idaho's 9th legislative district =

American legislative district

Idaho's 9th legislative district is one of 35 districts of the Idaho Legislature. It is currently represented by Abby Lee, Republican of Fruitland, Jacyn Gallagher, Republican of Weiser, and Judy Boyle, Republican of Midvale.

== District profile ==
=== 1992–2002 ===
From 1992 to 2002, District 9 consisted of all of Payette and Washington Counties and a portion of Gem County.

Legislature	Session	Senate	House Seat A	House Seat B
51st (1992–1994)	1st	Mary Hartung (R)	Gertrude Sutton (R)	Donna Jones (R)
51st (1992–1994)	2nd	Mary Hartung (R)	Gertrude Sutton (R)	Donna Jones (R)
52nd (1994–1996)	1st	Mary Hartung (R)	Gertrude Sutton (R)	Donna Jones (R)
52nd (1994–1996)	2nd	Ric Branch (R)	Gertrude Sutton (R)	Donna Jones (R)
53rd (1996–1998)	1st	Ric Branch (R)	Lawerence Denney (R)	Donna Jones (R)
53rd (1996–1998)	2nd	Ric Branch (R)	Lawerence Denney (R)	Donna Jones (R)
54th (1998–2000)	1st	Ric Branch (R)	Lawerence Denney (R)	Tom Limbaugh (R)
54th (1998–2000)	2nd	Ric Branch (R)	Lawerence Denney (R)	Monty Pearce (R)
55th (2000–2002)	1st	Ric Branch (R)	Lawerence Denney (R)	Monty Pearce (R)
55th (2000–2002)	2nd	Ric Branch (R)	Lawerence Denney (R)	Monty Pearce (R)

=== 2002–2012 ===
From 2002 to 2012, District 9 consisted of all of Adams, Payette, and Washington Counties and a portion of Canyon County.

Legislature	Session	Senate	House Seat A	House Seat B
57th (2002–2004)	1st	Monty Pearce (R)	Lawerence Denney (R)	Clete Edmunson (R)
57th (2002–2004)	2nd	Monty Pearce (R)	Lawerence Denney (R)	Clete Edmunson (R)
58th (2004–2006)	1st	Monty Pearce (R)	Lawerence Denney (R)	Clete Edmunson (R)
58th (2004–2006)	2nd	Monty Pearce (R)	Lawerence Denney (R)	Clete Edmunson (R)
59th (2006–2008)	1st	Monty Pearce (R)	Lawerence Denney (R)	Clete Edmunson (R)
59th (2006–2008)	2nd	Monty Pearce (R)	Lawerence Denney (R)	Diana Thomas(R)
60th (2008–2010)	1st	Monty Pearce (R)	Lawerence Denney (R)	Judy Boyle (R)
60th (2008–2010)	2nd	Monty Pearce (R)	Lawerence Denney (R)	Judy Boyle (R)
61st (2010–2012)	1st	Monty Pearce (R)	Lawerence Denney (R)	Judy Boyle (R)
61st (2010–2012)	2nd	Monty Pearce (R)	Lawerence Denney (R)	Judy Boyle (R)

=== 2012–2022 ===
District 9 currently consists of all of Adams, Payette, and Washington Counties and a portion of Canyon County.

Legislature	Session	Senate	House Seat A	House Seat B
62nd (2012–2014)	1st	Monty Pearce (R)	Lawerence Denney (R)	Judy Boyle (R)
62nd (2012–2014)	2nd	Monty Pearce (R)	Lawerence Denney (R)	Judy Boyle (R)
63rd (2014–2016)	1st	Abby Lee (R)	Ryan Kerby (R)	Judy Boyle (R)
63rd (2014–2016)	2nd	Abby Lee (R)	Ryan Kerby (R)	Judy Boyle (R)
64th (2016–2018)	1st	Abby Lee (R)	Ryan Kerby (R)	Judy Boyle (R)
64th (2016–2018)	2nd	Abby Lee (R)	Ryan Kerby (R)	Judy Boyle (R)
65th (2018–2020)	1st	Abby Lee (R)	Ryan Kerby (R)	Judy Boyle (R)
65th (2018–2020)	2nd	Abby Lee (R)	Ryan Kerby (R)	Judy Boyle (R)
66th (2020–2022)	1st	Abby Lee (R)	Ryan Kerby (R)	Judy Boyle (R)
66th (2020–2022)	2nd	Abby Lee (R)	Ryan Kerby (R)	Judy Boyle (R)

=== 2022–present ===
District 9 consists of all of Payette and Washington counties and a portion of Canyon County.

== See also ==
- List of Idaho senators
- List of Idaho representatives
