= Clete Edmunson =

American politician and educator from Idaho

Member of the Idaho House of Representatives from the 9th district
- In office December 1, 2002 – August 2007
- Preceded by: Monty Pearce
- Succeeded by: Diana Thomas

Personal details
- Born: Council, Idaho
- Party: Republican
- Education: Idaho State University (BA); Boise State University (MA)

Clete Edmunson is a former American politician and educator from Idaho who served as a member of the Idaho House of Representatives from 2002 to 2007.

== Early life and education ==
Edmunson was born in Council, Idaho. He earned a degree in business and in history from Idaho State University. Edmunson earned a Master of Arts degree in history from Boise State University.

== Career ==
In 1986, Edmunson served as a city council member in Weiser, Idaho, until 1994.

In 1994, Edmunson became a teacher and a football coach. In 1996, Edmunson became a county commissioner of Washington County, Idaho.

On November 5, 2002, Edmunson won the election and became a Republican member of Idaho House of Representatives for District 9 seat B. Edmunson defeated Caryl A. Whitlatch with 79.8% of the votes. On November 2, 2004, as an incumbent, Edmunson won the election unopposed and continued serving District 9 seat B. On November 7, 2006, as an incumbent, Edmunson won the election unopposed and continued serving District 9 seat B.

In August 2007, Edmunson resigned as a member of Idaho House of Representatives for District 9 seat B. Edmunson later joined the staff of Idaho governor Butch Otter as a field representatives. In September 2009, Edmunson joined Idaho Department of Labor.

Edmunson later became a teacher at New Plymouth High School. In 2015, after Kevin Barker accepted a position as the superintendent, Edmunson became a principal at New Plymouth High School. In 2018, Edmunson resigned as principal at New Plymouth High School. In July 2018, Edmunson became a superintendent and school principal for Council School District.

Clete Edmunson resigned from the Council School District with 2 years remaining on his contract. The Council School Board accepted his resignation at their regular meeting on June 26.

== Personal life ==
Edmunson's is married to Shelly Edmunson. The couple lived in Weiser, Idaho before returning to Council, Idaho in 2018.
