= Idaho State Highway 71 =

State highway in Adams and Washington counties in Idaho, United States

State Highway 71
- SH-71 highlighted in red

Route information
- Maintained by ITD
- Length: 28.790 mi (46.333 km)

Major junctions
- North end: Hells Canyon Road at the Oregon state line
- South end: US 95 in Cambridge

Location
- Country: United States
- State: Idaho
- Counties: Adams, Washington,

Highway system
- Idaho State Highway System; Interstate; US; State
← SH-69	→ SH-72

State Highway 71 (SH-71) is a 28.790-mile (46.333 km) state highway in Washington County, Idaho, United States, that extends very briefly north into Adams County and connects U.S. Route 95 (US 95) in Cambridge with Hells Canyon Road in Oregon. SH-71 is a two-lane road for its length. Except for the area near is southern terminus, SH-71 runs through remote and very sparsely populated areas.

== Route description ==
SH-71 begins on a bridge crossing the Snake River at the Oregon–Idaho border in Adams County, just downstream from the Brownlee Dam. (The road continues north into Baker County in Oregon, and along the west bank of the river, as Hells Canyon Road, heading toward the Hells Canyon National Recreation Area, Oregon Route 86, and the city of Halfway.) From its northern terminus, SH-71 heads south–southeast and immediately leaves Adams County and enters Washington County. About a one-half mile (0.80 km) later SH-71 passes next to the Brownlee Dam before continuing south–southeast for roughly four and a half miles (7.2 km) more as it winds along the eastern edge of the Brownlee Reservoir (on the Snake River).

Turning southerly, SH-71 heads away from the reservoir and river, initially running along east bank of Brownlee Creek for about 3.2 miles (5.1 km). Upon reaching the confluence of East Brownlee Creek and West Brownlee Creek (the source of the Brownlee Creek), SH-71 turns southeast to run along the north bank of East Brownlee Creek for approximately 4.4 miles (7.1 km) before crossing over the creek. SH-71 then heads southerly away from the creek. South of the creek SH-71 turns very briefly west–southwest and quickly climbs over 300 feet (91 m) out of the canyon of the East Brownlee Creek to cross a ridge and cross over Pine Creek. After heading south–southeasterly along Pine Creek for about 10.6 miles (17.1 km) and crossing Pine Creek a second time, SH-71 turns east–southeast and quickly crosses Pine Creek for a third and final time.

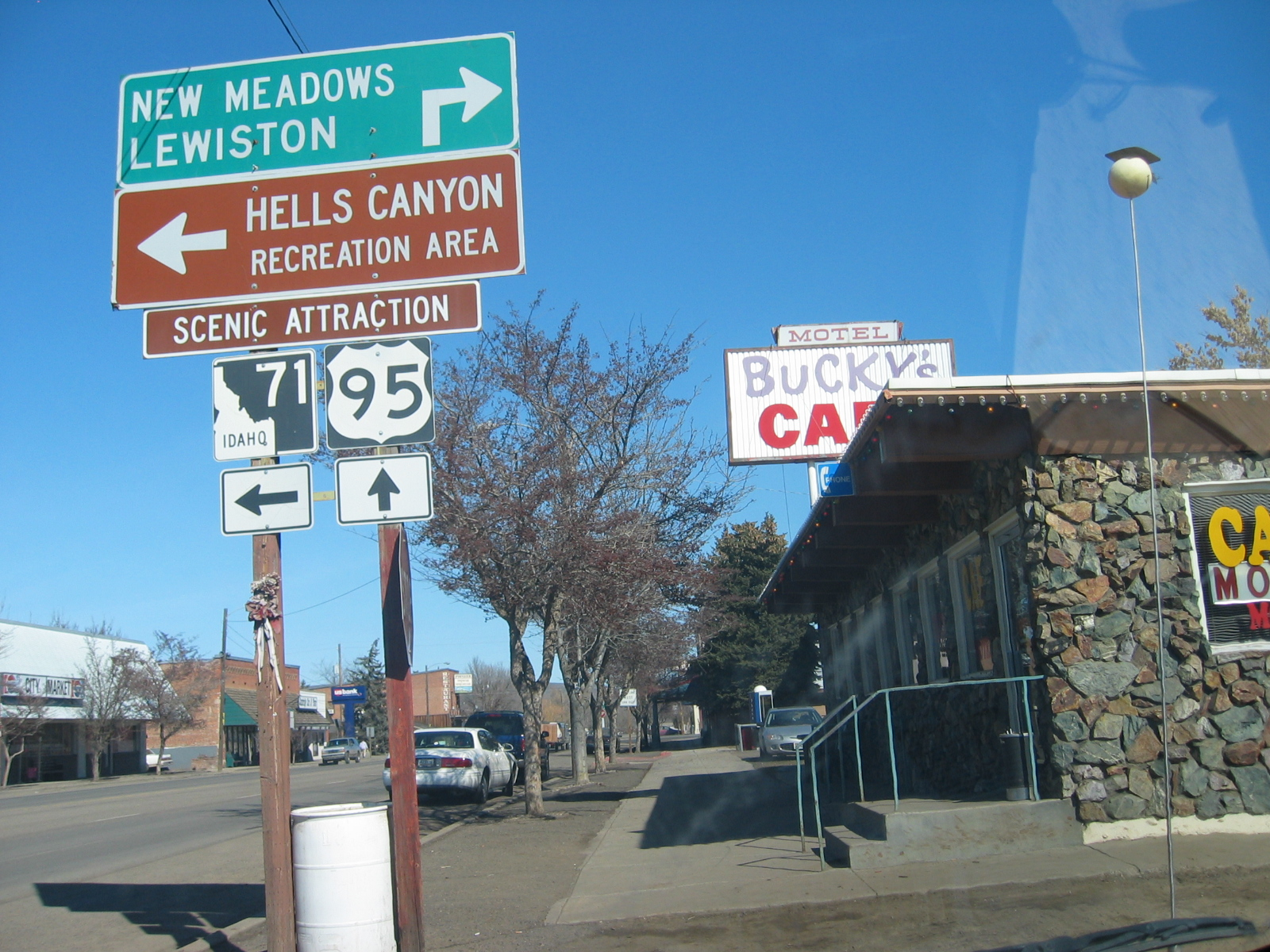
Road signs at the southern terminus of SH-71 (at US 95 in Cambridge, March 2005

Approximately 1.8 miles (2.9 km) beyond its final Pine Creek crossing, SH-71 turns east and immediately crosses Camp Creek. Beyond Camp Creek, SH-71 heads east through farmland for just over one-half mile (0.80 km) to enter the city of Cambridge and turn southeast to run along West Hopper Avenue. After four blocks along West Hopper Avenue, SH-71 reaches its southern terminus at US 95 (Superior Avenue) in the downtown area. (US 95 heads north toward Council, New Meadows, and Lewiston; and south through Midvale and Weiser, and then on toward Winnemucca, Nevada. Hopper Avenue continues southeast for just under two blocks before ending just short of the Weiser River Trail, a rail trail along the former Union Pacific Railroad right-of-way on the southeast edge of the city.)

== Major intersections ==
County	Location	mi	km	Destinations	Notes
Adams		0.000– 0.060	0.000– 0.097	Hells Canyon Road north – Hells Canyon National Recreation Area, Oregon Route 86, Halfway (Oregon)	Continuation north into Oregon beyond northern terminus
Adams		0.000– 0.060	0.000– 0.097	Oregon state line	Northern terminus
Adams		0.000– 0.060	0.000– 0.097	Bridge over the Snake River	
Adams–Washington county line		0.394	0.634		
Washington	Cambridge	28.790	46.333	US 95 north (Superior Street) – Council, New Meadows, Lewiston US 95 south (Superior Street) – Midvale, Weiser, Winnemucca (Nevada)	Southern terminus
Washington	Cambridge	28.790	46.333	Hopper Avenue southeast	Continuation southeast from southern teriminus
1.000 mi = 1.609 km; 1.000 km = 0.621 mi

== See also ==
- List of state highways in Idaho
