= Donald B. Anderson =

American judge (1904–1956)

Justice of the Idaho Supreme Court
- In office 1955 – December 16, 1956
- Appointed by: elected in 1954
- Preceded by: Raymond Givens
- Succeeded by: Henry McQuade

Personal details
- Born: Donald Brown Anderson; October 28, 1904 Cardston, Alberta, Canada
- Died: December 16, 1956 (aged 52) Caldwell, Idaho, U.S.
- Cause of death: Self-inflicted gunshot wound
- Resting place: Canyon Hill Cemetery; Caldwell, Idaho
- Spouse(s): Lois G. Nichols Anderson (m.1955–1956, his death)
- Children: 1 son
- Education: University of Idaho (LLB)

Donald Brown Anderson (October 28, 1904 – December 16, 1956) was a justice of the Idaho Supreme Court from 1955 to 1956. He received his LL.B. from the University of Idaho College of Law in 1927.

== Early life ==
Born in Canada at Cardston, Alberta, Anderson's family moved to the United States in his childhood and farmed near Weiser, Idaho. He graduated from Weiser High School, received his LL.B. degree from the University of Idaho College of Law in 1927, and entered the practice of law in Canyon County at Caldwell.

== Public service ==
Anderson served as the prosecuting attorney of Canyon County for six years in the 1930s, and was a probate judge for four years, from 1937 to 1941. In April 1941, he joined the Federal Bureau of Investigation (FBI), working in Chicago and Washington, D.C., ultimately becoming a special assistant to the Attorney General J. Howard McGrath. Anderson returned to Idaho in 1948 to resume the practice of law, and served as a judge of the Idaho Seventh Judicial District from 1950 to 1954, when he was elected to the state supreme court, where he remained until his death.

== Personal life and death ==
On September 2, 1955, Anderson married Lois Nichols of Boise, with whom he had a son, Ross Nichols Anderson.

On December 16, 1956, Anderson was reported missing from his home, and a search ensued. Early the following day, Anderson's body was found near his vehicle, approximately 100 feet (30 m) off of U.S. Highway 30 just west of Caldwell, with two bullet wounds to the head, and a .38 caliber revolver by his side. It was determined that the first shot had failed to penetrate the skull, and the death was ruled a suicide. Anderson was buried at Canyon Hill Cemetery in Caldwell.

== See also ==
- List of solved missing person cases

Political offices
Preceded by Raymond L. Givens	Justice of the Idaho Supreme Court; 1955–1956	Succeeded by Henry F. McQuade
