= James King (architect) =

American architect

James King was an early architect in Idaho. He was the first formally trained architect operating in the state.

He was born in Pittsburgh, Pennsylvania and studied architecture there. During the American Civil War he served in the quartermaster's department, in West Virginia. After the war he practiced architecture in West Virginia. He moved to Boise, Idaho in 1888.

According to the National Register nomination about one of his works, "Research has not revealed much information about King, and few of his buildings remain." Photos of some of his works show "that he worked in the prevailing eclectic idiom style: the C.W. Moore house is a flamboyant Chateauesque residence, and the [Boise City National] bank building is Richardsonian Romanesque; the [Washington County] courthouse had a Georgian Revival cupola, a projecting pavilion reminiscent of Federal architecture and round Romanesque arches."

Several of his works are listed on the National Register of Historic Places (NRHP).

Works include:

- Bishops House (1889), moved to its present location in 1977.
- Benjamin Watlington House (1890), Queen Anne-style, NRHP-listed
- Washington County's courthouse (1890), demolished 1938.
- Boise City National Bank Building (1891–92), aka 801 Building, Boise. King completed design of three-story originally constructed building; initial work was by a Chicago architect. The fourth floor and parapet were designed by Tourtellotte & Co. and added later.
- C.W. Moore House (1892), Warm Springs Ave., Boise. Geothermally heated. NRHP-listed
- First Presbyterian Church (1893), Boise
- Old Idaho State Penitentiary's wall and administration building (1893–94), Boise
- Kingsbury-Day House (1896), Boise
