= Diana Thomas =

Diana Thomas may refer to:

- Diana Thomas (mathematician) (active since 1998), American mathematician and nutritionist
- Diana Thomas (politician) (born 1945), American politician and writer
- Diana Thomas (writer) (born 1959), English journalist and novelist

== See also ==
- Diane Thomas (1946–1985), American screenwriter
