= Cambridge News Office =

- U.S. National Register of Historic Places
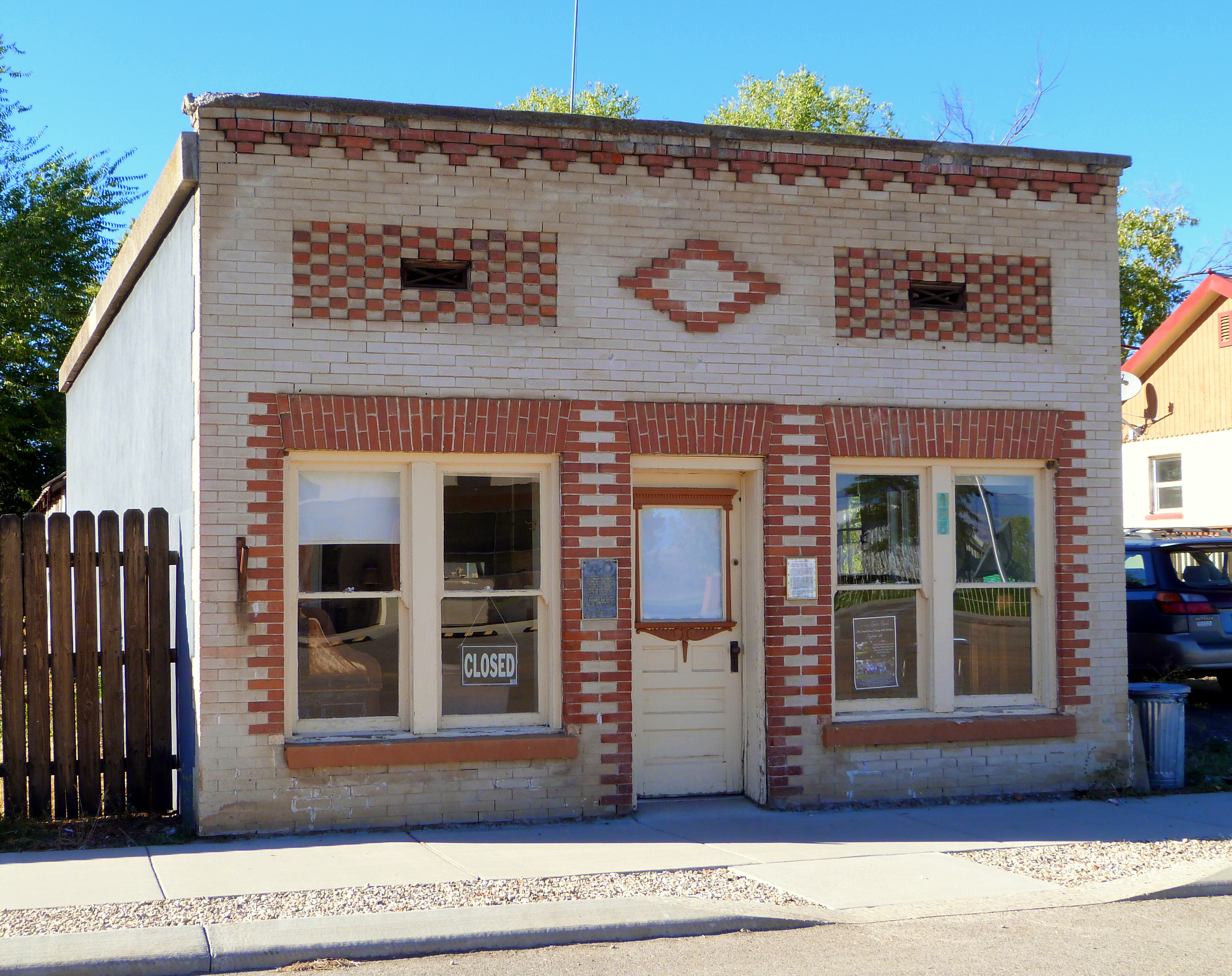

- Location within Idaho
- Location: 155 N. Superior St., Cambridge, Idaho
- Coordinates: 44°34′24″N 116°40′30″W
- Area: less than one acre
- Built: 1912
- NRHP reference No.: 89002128
- Added to NRHP: December 28, 1989

The Cambridge News Office, at 155 N. Superior St. in Cambridge, Idaho, was built in 1912. It was listed on the National Register of Historic Places in 1989.

It is a one-story red and yellow brick commercial building, about 20 by 32 feet (6.1 m × 9.8 m) in plan, built upon a concrete raft foundation. It was built to host The Idaho Citizen, one of the oldest weekly newspapers in Idaho, which later became the Cambridge News.

It has a decorated appearance, with its mainly yellow brick front facade topped by a false front parapet with a cornice of contrasting red brick corbelling, and with simulated quoins around door and windows also done in red brick.

The primary significance of the building is its association with the newspaper, which was established in 1889 in the mining town of Salubria, Idaho, three miles west of Cambridge. It was moved to Cambridge after the P & IN Railroad was built across the Weiser River instead of through Salubria, and buildings were either moved or torn down and rebuilt in the new townsite of Cambridge.

It was the area's only source for world, national, and local news, and was published each Thursday; the Thursday publication history continued to the date of National Register listing. It was the only business in Cambridge to have operated in the same building since 1912.
