= Weiser River =

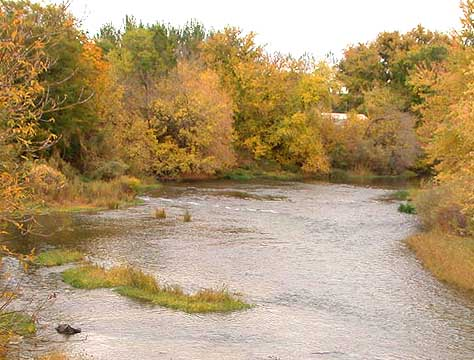
- The Weiser River outside Weiser, Idaho, October 2004

- Location of the mouth of the Weiser River in Idaho Weiser River (the United States)

Location
- Country: United States
- State: Idaho
- Counties: Adams, Washington, Valley

Physical characteristics
- Source
  - location: northwest of New Meadows, Adams County, Idaho
  - coordinates: 45°01′13″N 116°26′05″W
  - elevation: 4,174 ft (1,272 m)
- Mouth: Snake River
  - location: near Weiser, Washington County, Idaho
  - coordinates: 44°14′19″N 116°58′20″W
  - elevation: 2,096 ft (639 m)
- Length: 103 mi (166 km)
- Basin size: 1,660 sq mi (4,300 km^{2})
- Discharge
  - location: Weiser Idaho
  - average: 925 cuft/s
  - minimum: 82 cuft/s
  - maximum: 8,000 cuft/s

The Weiser River is a 103-mile-long (166 km) tributary of the Snake River in western Idaho in the United States. It drains a mountainous area of 1,660 square miles (4,300 km^{2}) consisting primarily of low rolling foothills intersected by small streams south and east of Hells Canyon along the Idaho-Oregon border.

== Description ==
It rises in northern Adams County in the Seven Devils Mountains, approximately 10 miles (16 km) west of New Meadows in the Payette National Forest. It flows generally southwest, between the Cuddy Mountains to the west and the West Mountains to the east, past Council and Cambridge. In southern Washington County it turns west for its lower 10 miles (16 km) and enters a broadening valley called the Weiser Cove along the northwestern extreme of the Snake River Plain before entering the Snake from the east at Weiser.

It receives the Little Weiser River from the east approximately 2 miles (3 km) southwest of Cambridge. The river descends from approximately 8,000 feet (2,400 m) above sea level at its source to 2,090 feet (640 m) at its mouth on the Snake. For much of its upper reaches, the river follows a narrow course through the mountains, emerging at times into several broad ranching valleys, including one around Midvale. Although it flows unimpeded, it is used for irrigation in the vicinity of its mouth upstream from Weiser, as well along tributaries in its upper reaches. The Pacific and Idaho Northern Railroad formerly followed its course from Weiser to New Meadows.

The river, as well as the town of Weiser, are named for Private Peter M. Weiser of the Lewis and Clark Expedition of 1804-1806.

== See also ==
- List of Idaho rivers
- List of longest streams of Idaho
