= Wilson House (Cambridge, Idaho) =

Historic house in Idaho, United States

- U.S. National Register of Historic Places
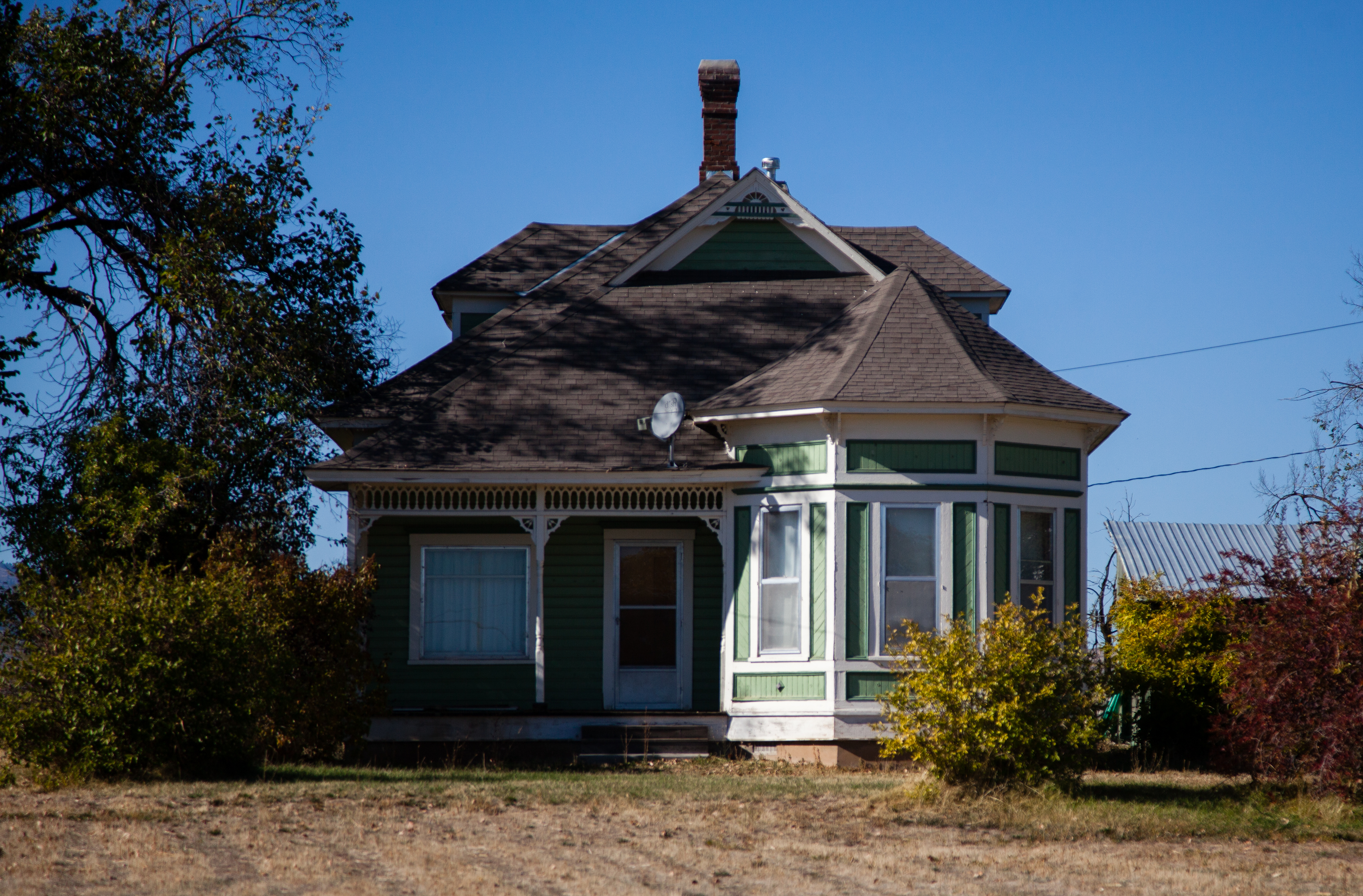

- Location within Idaho Location within the United States
- Nearest city: Cambridge, Idaho
- Area: less than one acre
- Built: 1903
- Architectural style: Queen Anne
- NRHP reference No.: 03001369
- Added to NRHP: January 6, 2004

The Wilson House in Cambridge in Washington County, Idaho was built in 1903. It was listed on the National Register of Historic Places in 2004.

It is a one-and-a-half-story,28 by 54 feet (8.5 m × 16.5 m) wood frame, Late Victorian house that may be characterized as Queen Anne in style for its exterior and interior details.

It was built by/for Riel and Etta Wilson.
