= Abby Lee (politician) =

American politician from Idaho

Member of the Idaho Senate from District 9
- In office December 1, 2014 – July 1, 2024
- Preceded by: Monty Pearce
- Succeeded by: Brandon Shippy

Personal details
- Born: 1971 or 1972 (age 54–55)
- Party: Republican
- Spouse: Brian
- Children: 2
- Education: Brigham Young University; Boise State University
- Website: http://abbyleeforidaho.us/

Abby Lee (born 1971) is a former Republican member of the Idaho Senate, representing District 9 from 2014 to 2024. Lee is currently serving as the Oregon Community College Association Executive Director since July 1, 2024.

== Idaho Senate ==
=== Committee assignments ===
- Finance
- Heath and Welfare
- Judiciary and Rules

Lee previously served on the Agriculture Affairs Committee from 2014 to 2016 and the Commerce and Human Resources Committee from 2014 to 2015.

== Elections ==
District 9 Senate - Adams, Payette, and Washington Counties and a portion of Canyon County.
Year	Candidate	Votes	Pct	Candidate	Votes	Pct
2014 Primary	Abby Lee	3,663	55.6%	Monty Pearce (incumbent)	2,921	44.4%
2014 General	Abby Lee	10,728	100%			
2016 Primary	Abby Lee (incumbent)	2,945	50.3%	Viki Purdy	2,911	49.7%
2016 General	Abby Lee (incumbent)	14,370	79.8%	Carol Bogue	3,642	20.2%

== Personal life ==
Lee and her husband Brian have two daughters. They reside in Fruitland, Idaho.
