= Diana Thomas (politician) =

American politician and educator from Idaho

Member of the Idaho House of Representatives from the District 9 seat B district
- In office August 2007 – December 1, 2008
- Preceded by: Clete Edmunson
- Succeeded by: Judy Boyle

Personal details
- Born: August 19, 1945 (age 80) Nampa, Idaho
- Party: Republican
- Occupation: Educator

Diana Thomas is an American politician and educator from Idaho. Thomas is a Republican former member of Idaho House of Representatives. Thomas is the mayor of Weiser, Idaho.

== Early life ==
On August 19, 1945, Thomas was born in Nampa, Idaho.

== Education ==
In 1966, Thomas earned a Bachelor of Arts degree in Elementary Education from College of Idaho. In 1987, Thomas earned a Master of Arts degree in Teaching Math in Elementary School from College of Idaho.

== Career ==
In 1971, Thomas became a teacher in Weiser School District, until 1991.

In 2001, Thomas served as county commissioner for Washington County, Idaho, until 2007.

In 2007, Clete Edmunson resigned as a member of Idaho House of Representatives to join the staff of Governor Butch Otter. Thomas was appointed by Governor Butch Otter to serve the remaining term as a Republican member of Idaho House of Representatives for District 9 seat B.

On May 27, 2008, as an incumbent, Thomas sought a seat in District 9 seat B but lost the election in the Republican Primary. Thomas was defeated by Judy Boyle with 53.4% of the votes. Thomas received 46.6% of the votes.

In 2012, Thomas became the mayor of Weiser, Idaho.

== Awards ==
- 2018 Harold Hurst Award (June 21, 2018), presented by Association of Idaho Cites (AIC) in Boise, Idaho.

== Personal life ==
Thomas' husband is Mike. They have two children. They live in Weiser, Idaho.
