= Monty Pearce =

American politician from Idaho

Member of the Idaho Senate from the 9th district
- In office December 1, 2002 – December 1, 2014
- Preceded by: Ric Branch
- Succeeded by: Abby Lee

Member of the Idaho House of Representatives from the 9B district
- In office October 15, 1999 – December 1, 2002
- Preceded by: Tom Limbaugh
- Succeeded by: Clete Edmunson

Personal details
- Born: September 29, 1948 (age 77) Sacramento, California, U.S.
- Party: Republican
- Spouse: Merry
- Children: 7
- Education: Ricks College (AA); Brigham Young University (BA)

Monty J. Pearce (born September 29, 1948) was an American politician who served as a member of the Idaho Senate from 2002 to 2014 representing, the 9th district. He previously served the Idaho House of Representatives for district 9, seat B, from 1999 to 2002.

== Early life and education ==
Pearce was born in Sacramento, California and raised in New Plymouth, Idaho. He received an associate's degree from Ricks College and a Bachelor of Arts degree from Brigham Young University.

== Career ==
He is a successful rancher, raising purebred Black and Red Angus cattle and Quarterhorses on his ranch near New Plymouth.

Pearce served as a member of the Idaho Senate from 2002 to 2014, representing the 9th district until he lost to Abby Lee in the Republican primary. Pearce was a member of the Idaho State House of Representatives from 1999 to 2002.

Pearce endorsed Ron Paul in the 2012 Republican Party presidential primaries.

== Personal life ==
He is married to Merry Pearce and they have seven children.
