= Weiser School District =

School district in Idaho, United States

Address
- 925 Pioneer Road Weiser, Washington County, Idaho; United States

District information
- Grades: Pre-Kindergarten - Grade 12
- Schools: 5
- District ID: 1603330

Students and staff
- Students: 1,525
- Teachers: 88.53 FTE
- Student–teacher ratio: 17.23:1

Other information
- Website: www.weiserschools.org

Weiser School District 431 is a school district headquartered in Weiser, Idaho.

The district includes Weiser and some unincorporated areas. As of 1998 Weiser High School takes students who live in Annex, Oregon.

== History ==
Lloyd Eason was superintendent until 1964. Thomas "Tom" Falash succeeded him in the position. Falash was in the position until 1992; he died in 2019.

Circa 1977-1979 there were bond elections that were voted down by voters. In 1979 there was a bond election for a new junior high school, worth $1,650,000. The voters approved of the bond with 68.4% approving.

Wade Wilson was superintendent until he retired in February 2023. The retirement occurred on June 30, 2023.

== Schools ==
- Weiser High School
- Weiser Middle School
- Park Intermediate School
- Pioneer Elementary School
- Indianhead Academy Alternative High School
