= Jewell Building (Cambridge, Idaho) =

United States historic place

- U.S. National Register of Historic Places
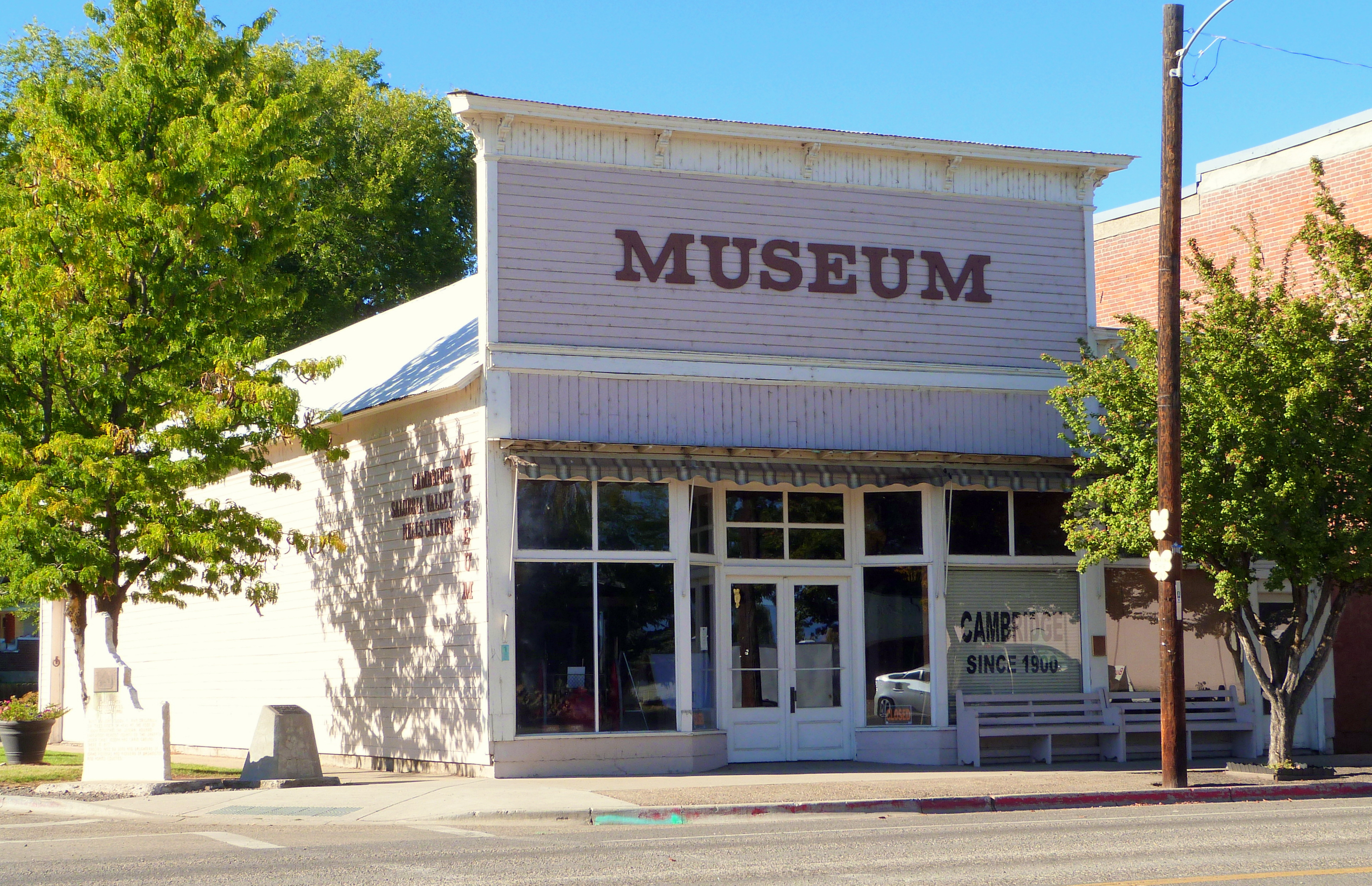

- Location within Idaho
- Location: 15 N. Superior, Cambridge, Idaho
- Coordinates: 44°34′19″N 116°40′36″W
- Area: less than one acre
- Built: 1905
- NRHP reference No.: 89002263
- Added to NRHP: January 18, 1990

The Jewell Building is a historic building at 15 N. Superior in Cambridge, Idaho, United States. Built in 1905, it was listed on the National Register of Historic Places in 1990.

It is a one-story timber-framed commercial building. It was one of the earliest commercial buildings in the town and served as its general store for decades.
