= Judy Boyle =

American politician from Idaho

Member of the Idaho House of Representatives from the District 9 seat B district
- Incumbent
- Assumed office December 1, 2008
- Preceded by: Diana Thomas

Personal details
- Born: Midvale, Idaho
- Party: Republican
- Education: Lassen College; Boise State University; University of Idaho
- Occupation: Politician, rancher
- Website: judyboyle.net

Judy Boyle is an American politician from Idaho. A Republican, she is a member of Idaho House of Representatives for District 9 seat B. Boyle is the current chair of the Western Legislative Forestry Task Force (WLFTF).

== Early life ==
Boyle was born in Midvale, Idaho.

== Education ==
Boyle has attended Lassen College, Boise State University, and the University of Idaho.

== Career ==
On May 27, 2008, Boyle won the Republican primary. Boyle defeated Diana Thomas with 53.4% of the votes. On November 4, 2008, Boyle won the election and became a Republican member of the Idaho House of Representatives for District 9 seat B. Boyle defeated Jennifer M. Morgan with 66.8% of the votes.

On May 25, 2010, Boyle was unopposed in the Republican primary. On November 2, 2010, as an incumbent, Boyle won the general election unopposed and continued serving District 9 seat B. On November 6, 2012, as an incumbent, Boyle won the election and continued serving District 9 seat B. Boyle defeated Mary Sue Roach with 65.2% of the votes. On November 4, 2014, as an incumbent, Boyle won the election unopposed and continued serving District 9 seat B. On November 8, 2016, as an incumbent, Boyle won the election and continued serving District 9 seat B. Boyle defeated Allen Schmidt with 73.2% of the votes.

In 2019, Boyle became the chairman of the Western Legislative Forestry Task Force (WLFTF).

Boyle on November 18, 2020, announced that she would run against Mike Moyle for Idaho House of Representatives Majority Leader.

== Political activities ==
In 2023, Boyle and Idaho Senator Tammy Nichols introduced HB 154, a bill that would make it a misdemeanor to provide or administer a vaccine developed using mRNA technology in any individual or mammal in the state. Such vaccines would include the COVID-19 vaccine and other vaccines in development that target RSV, some cancers, HIV, influenza, cystic fibrosis, and others.

== Personal life ==
Boyle has two children, Brian and Peggy. She lives in Midvale, Idaho.
