= Moore-Cunningham House =

- U.S. National Register of Historic Places
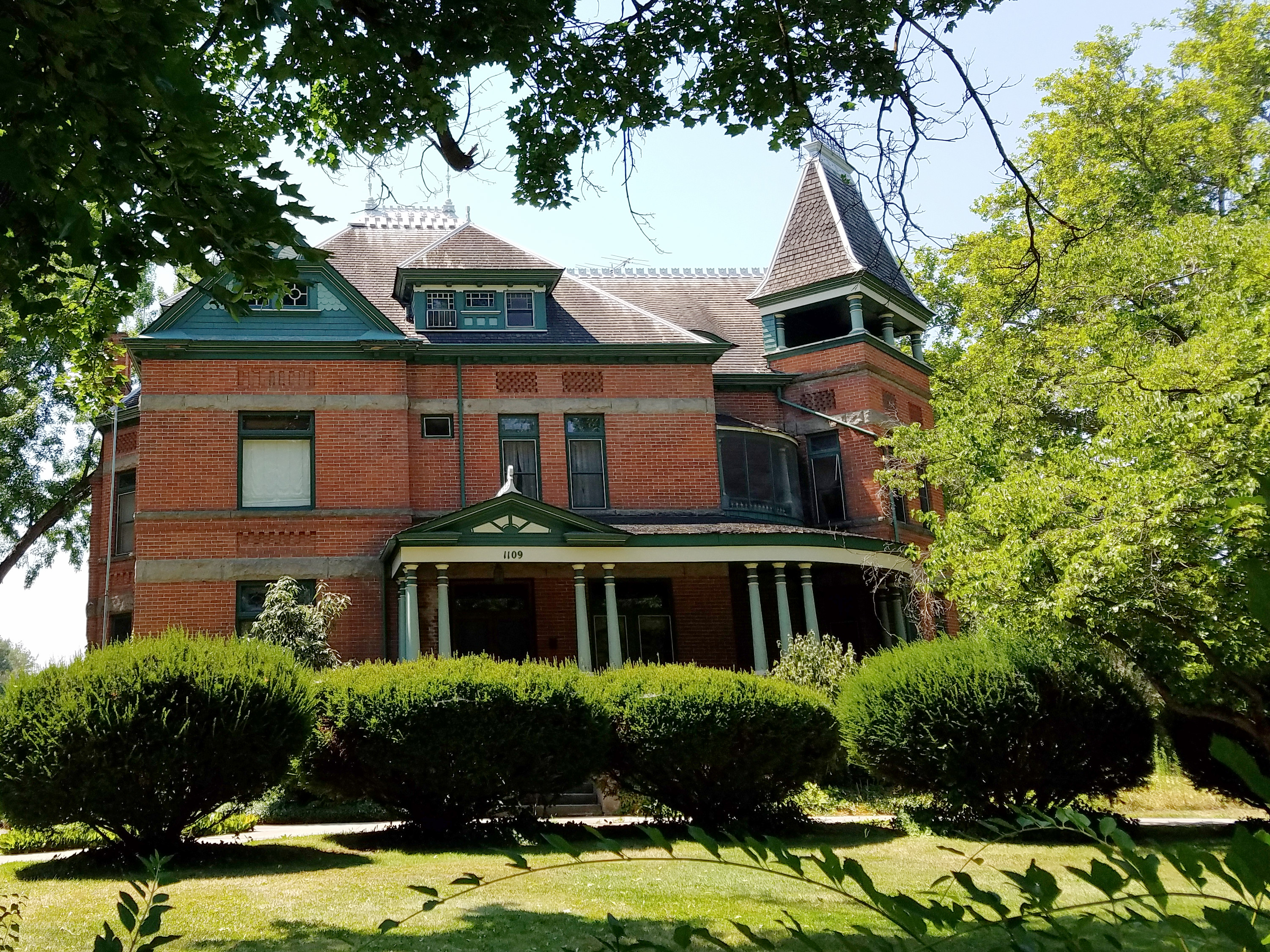

- Location within Idaho Location within the United States
- Location: 1109 Warm Springs Avenue, Boise, Idaho
- Coordinates: 43°36′24″N 116°10′53″W
- Area: 1.5 acres (0.61 ha)
- Built: 1892
- Architect: James King
- Architectural style: Queen Anne
- NRHP reference No.: 77000449
- Added to NRHP: April 29, 1977

The Moore-Cunningham House is a Queen Anne style mansion designed by architect James King and constructed in Boise, Idaho in 1892. The brick house is 6326 square feet and contains five bedrooms, 4.75 bathrooms, and features a wraparound veranda and an observation tower. It is the first house in Boise to use geothermal heating.

Since its construction, the Moore-Cunningham House had been owned by family members and descendants of Christopher W. Moore, but in 2017 it was listed for sale at $2.4 million.

The house was listed on the National Register of Historic Places in 1977.

== See also ==
C. W. Moore Park
