= Col. C. F. Drake House =

- U.S. National Register of Historic Places
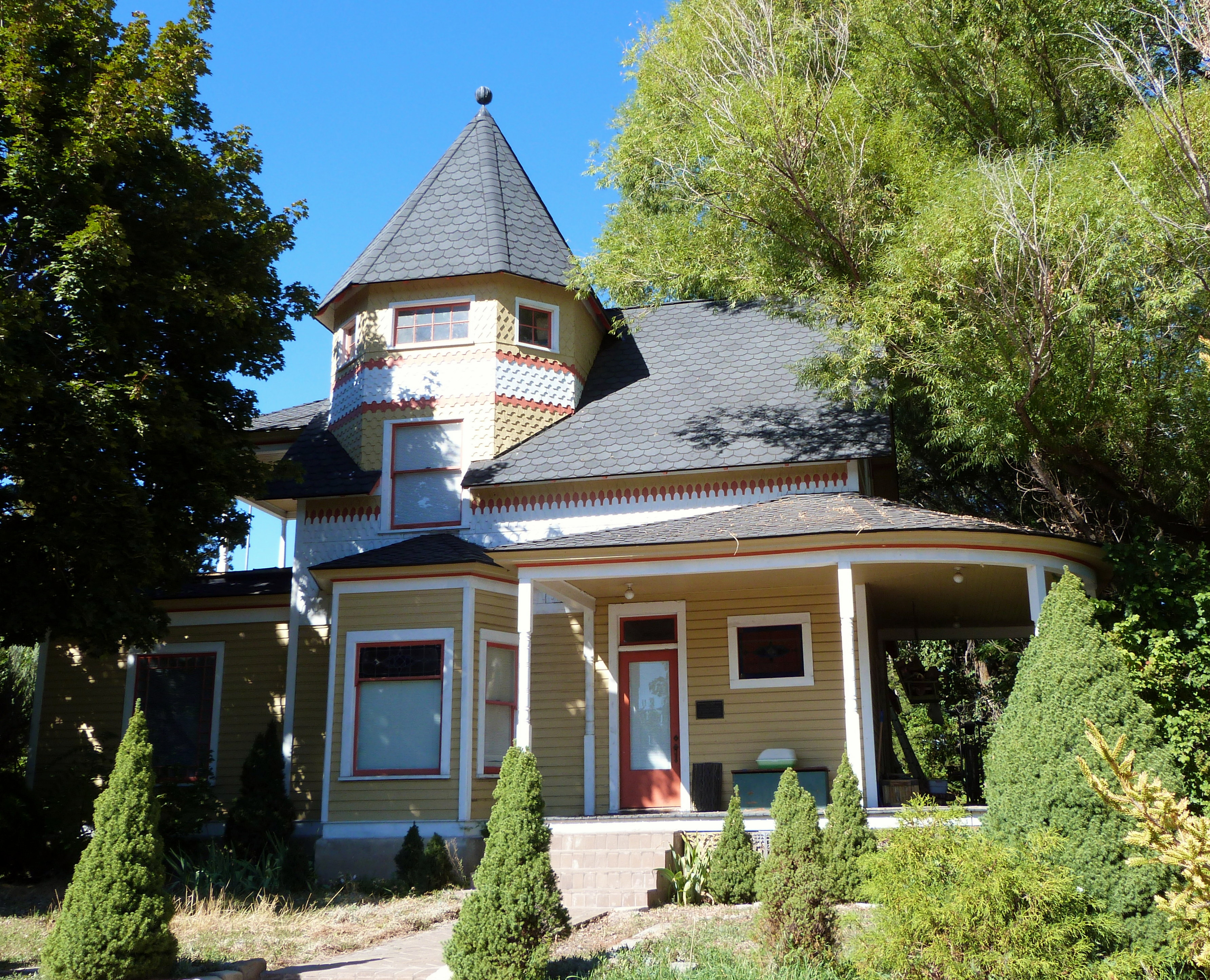

- Location within Idaho
- Location: 516 E. Main St., Weiser, Idaho
- Coordinates: 44°14′45″N 116°57′39″W
- Area: less than one acre
- Built: 1899
- Architectural style: Shingle Style
- NRHP reference No.: 78001104
- Added to NRHP: January 20, 1978

The Col. C. F. Drake House, at 516 E. Main St. in Weiser, Idaho, was built in 1899. It was listed on the National Register of Historic Places in 1978.

Date added: January 20, 1978 Architect: Unknown Architecture: Shingle Style
