= C. W. Moore Park =

Park in Boise, Idaho, USA

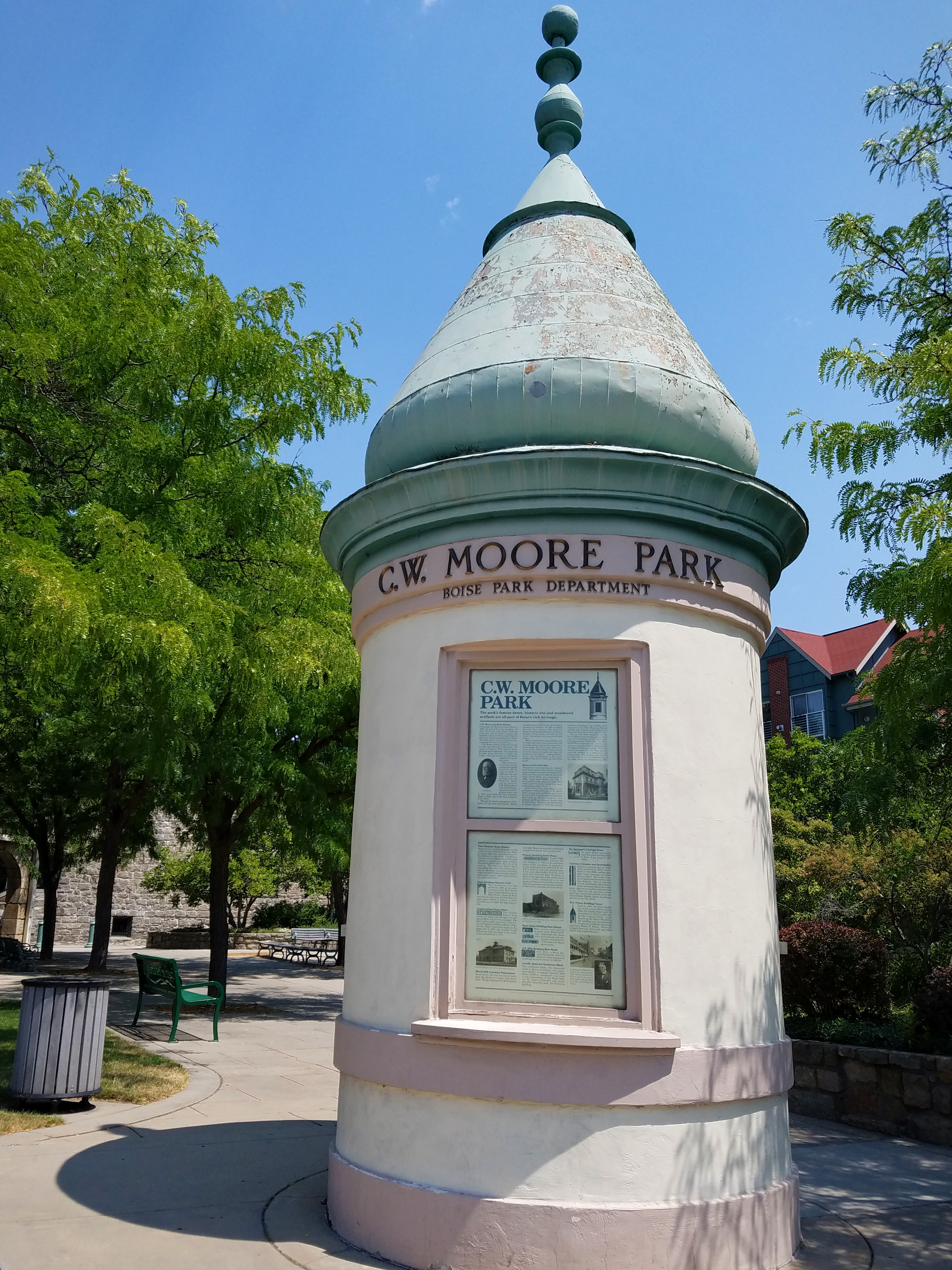
- W. E. Pierce Building Turret
- Interactive map of C. W. Moore Park
- Type: Urban park
- Location: 150 S 5th St. Boise, Idaho
- Coordinates: 43°36′46″N 116°11′59″W
- Area: 0.28 acres (0.11 ha)
- Created: 1983
- Operator: Boise Parks and Recreation

C. W. Moore Park is a 0.28-acre (0.11 ha) urban park in Boise, Idaho. The park is managed by the Boise Parks and Recreation Department and includes architectural artifacts from some of Boise's demolished buildings.

== History ==
The park was dedicated in 1983 on property deeded to the city in 1916 by Christopher W. Moore (November 30, 1835--September 20, 1916), a pioneer who moved to Idaho in 1863. In 1914, Moore established a playground for small children at his property on Grove Street, the site of C. W. Moore Park. In his will, Moore awarded funds to the Children's Aid and Home Finding Society.

Moore operated mercantile stores and helped to found the First National Bank of Idaho. He also served as president of the Boise Artesian Hot and Cold Water Company.

== Architectural artifacts ==
- W.E. Pierce Building Turret (1903)
- Bush Building Entrance Arch (1904)
- Cast-iron Columns & Streetlights (1880s)
- Dr. Springer’s Carriage Stone (1890s)
- A.T. Ellis Building Date Stone (1902-03)
- Pioneer Building Name Stone (1894)
- Central School Name Stone (1905)
- Morris Hill Cemetery Waterwheel

== See also ==
- List of parks in Boise
- Moore-Cunningham House
