= Annex, Oregon =

Unincorporated community in the state of Oregon, United States

- Census-designated place
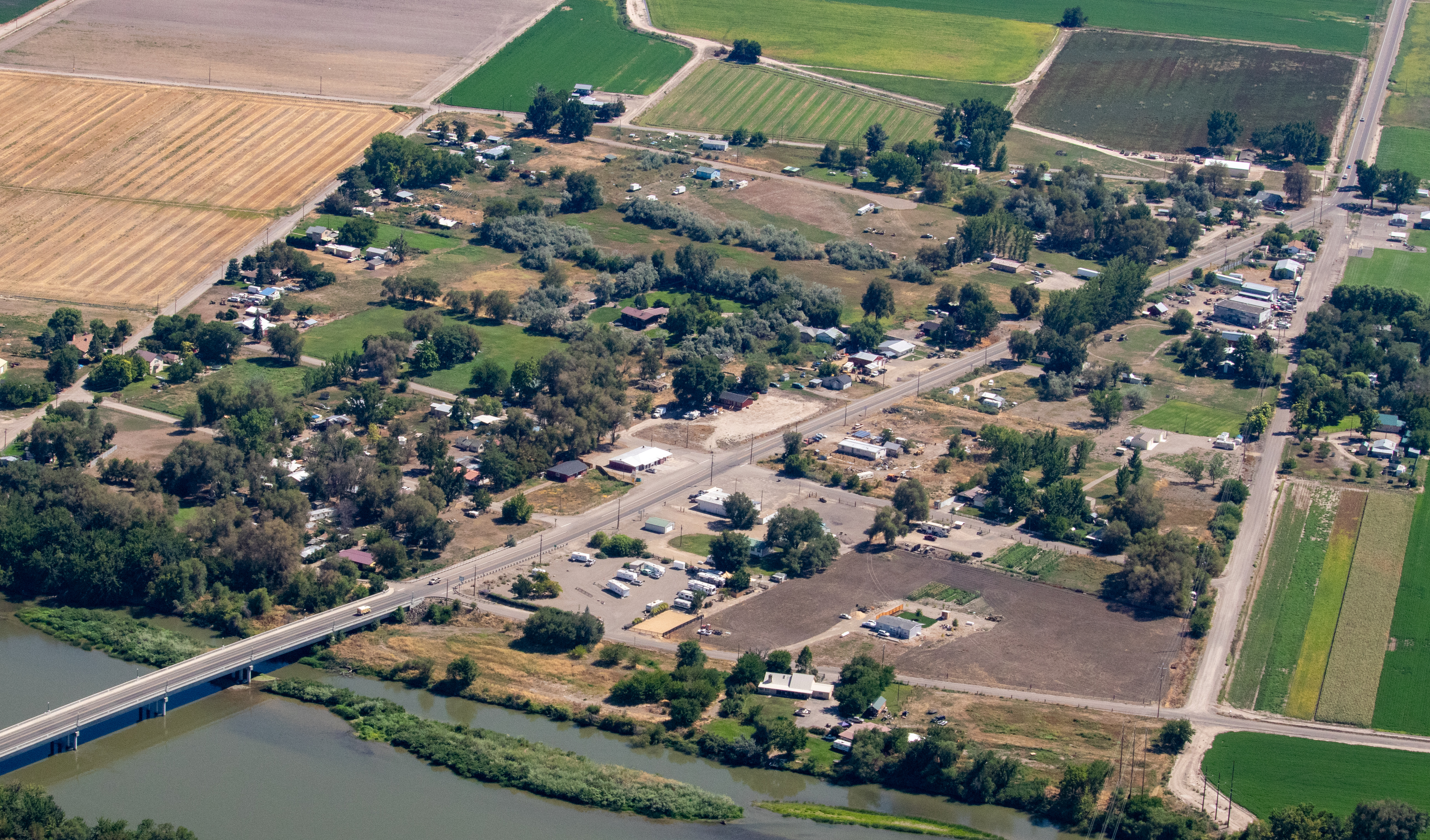
- The town of Annex

- Location within Oregon Location within the United States
- Coordinates: 44°14′25″N 116°59′04″W
- Country: United States
- State: Oregon
- County: Malheur

Area
  - Total: 2.46 sq mi (6.37 km^{2})
  - Land: 2.46 sq mi (6.37 km^{2})
  - Water: 0 sq mi (0.00 km^{2})
- Elevation: 2,106 ft (642 m)

Population (2020)
  - Total: 225
  - Density: 91.5/sq mi (35.32/km^{2})
- Time zone: UTC-7 (Mountain (MST))
  - Summer (DST): UTC-6 (MDT)
- ZIP code: 97914 (Ontario)
- Area codes: 541 & 458
- GNIS feature ID: 2611714
- FIPS Code: 41-02200

Annex is an unincorporated community and census-designated place in Malheur County, Oregon, United States. Its population was 225 as of the 2020 census.

== Geography ==
The community is located on the south bank of the Snake River across from Weiser, Idaho; a bridge carrying U.S. Route 95 Spur connects the two. It is 17 miles (27 km) north of Ontario, the largest city in Malheur County, via Oregon Route 201, which passes just south of Annex.

According to the U.S. Census Bureau, the Annex CDP has an area of 2.46 square miles (6.37 km^{2}), all land.

== Demographics ==
Historical population
Census	Pop.	Note	%±
2010	235		—
2020	225		−4.3%
U.S. Decennial Census

== Education ==
Annex is within the Annex School District 29. It operates a K-8 school called the Annex Charter School. In 1967 the Annex School was having a new building established.

As of 1998 students who graduate from Annex attend Weiser High School, of the Weiser School District, in Weiser, Idaho. In 1958, there were 46 students at Weiser High who lived in the Annex and Jefferson school districts.

The section of Malheur County in which this community is located in is in the Treasure Valley Community College district.
