= Boise City National Bank =

- U.S. National Register of Historic Places
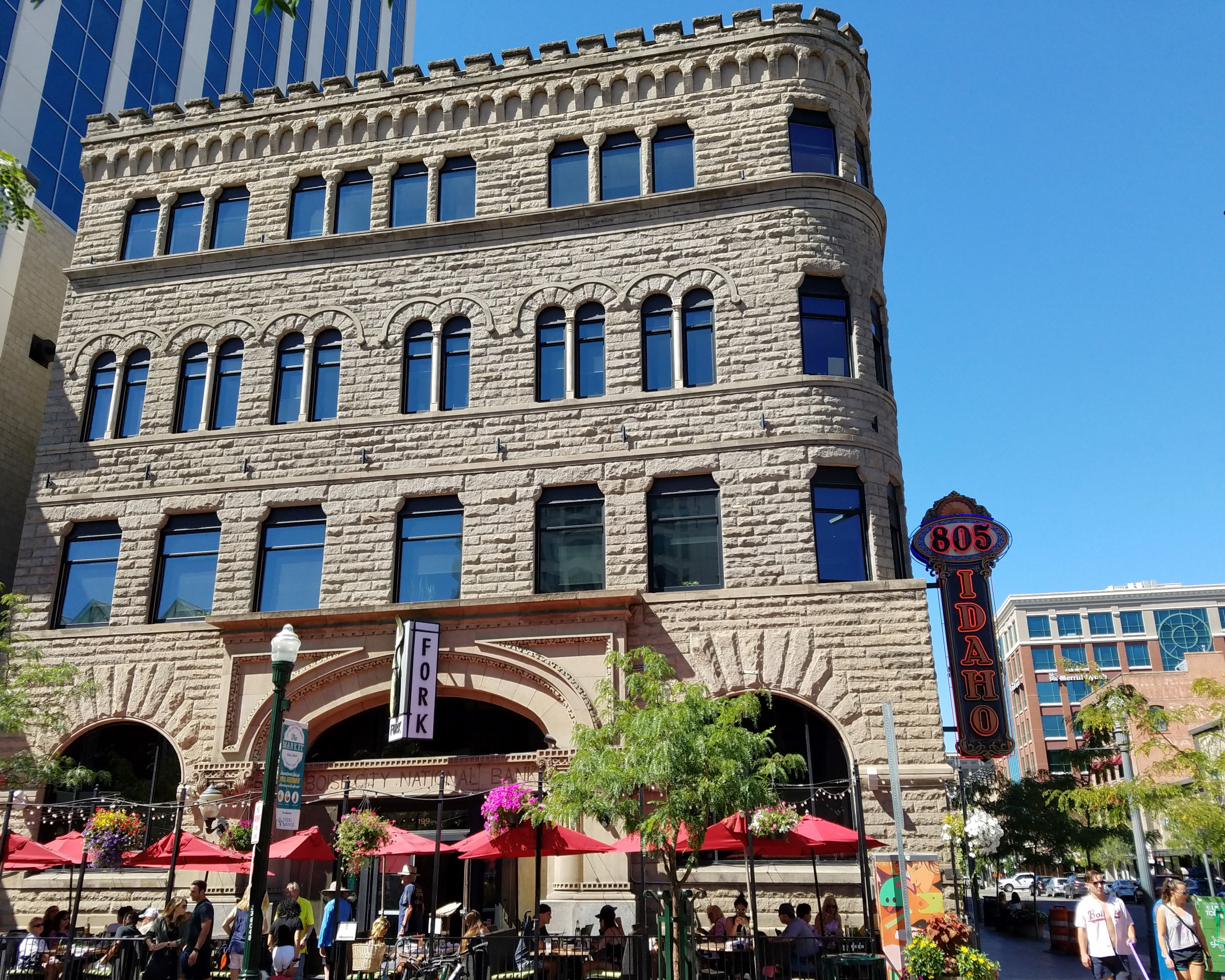
- The Boise City National Bank building in 2018

- Location within Idaho Location within the United States
- Location: 8th and Idaho Sts., Boise, Idaho
- Coordinates: 43°36′59″N 116°12′08″W
- Area: less than one acre
- Built: 1891
- Architect: James King; Tourtellotte & Co.
- Architectural style: Richardsonian Romanesque
- NRHP reference No.: 78001030
- Added to NRHP: November 28, 1978

The Boise City National Bank building in Boise, Idaho, was designed by architect James King as a 3-story, Richardsonian Romanesque commercial structure, inspired by the Marshall Field's Wholesale Store in Chicago. Construction began in April, 1891, and the building was completed in 1892.

The Boise City National Bank building also has been named the Simplot Building, the Baird Building, and the Capital Security Building. Additionally the building is known informally either as the 801 Building or as the 805 Building.

The building was added to the National Register of Historic Places November 28, 1978.

== Architecture ==
The Boise City National Bank building was constructed on a corner lot measuring 70 feet on West Idaho Street and 60 feet on North 8th Street, and within the building the bank occupied commercial space 25 feet by 53 feet. Other storefront space opened onto 8th Street and Idaho Street. The second and third floors each contained eleven offices brightened by a central skylight.

The building features a sandstone facade, originally intended to extend only six feet above street level. Brick with stone trim would have completed the facade above the sandstone. But the design was modified a month after construction began, completing the entire facade in sandstone. Delivery of one block of stone from quarries at Table Rock weighing 14,000 pounds required a team of eight horses.

In 1904 Tourtellotte & Co. began constructing a 4th floor of the building, and the architects supervised an interior renovation and installed an elevator. Frontage on Idaho Street expanded to 150 feet, including 25 feet frontage for the Boise Butcher Co. Depth of the building expanded to 122 feet. The sandstone facade was extended to cover the new construction. When completed, the new top floor was designed further by architects Wayland & Fennell to accommodate the Boise Commercial Club.

In 1912 Tourtellotte & Hummel redesigned the 8th Street exposure, moving the bank entrance from the corner of 8th and Idaho Streets to a new location on 8th Street and expanding the bank into space previously rented by Ballou & Latimer Drug Store.

== History of Boise City National Bank ==
Boise City National Bank opened April 1, 1886, in a building at 7th and Main Streets in Boise City. In May of that year it received a shipment of engraved bank notes, and in July the bank began paying interest on term deposits. In November the bank became a federal depository. By the end of 1886 the bank had nearly $64,000 in demand deposits and over $20,000 in term deposits. As its business grew, the bank needed a larger building.

Plans for the new building were drawn 18 months prior to construction in 1891, and the delay may have reflected concern at the bank that Idaho would not remain a state but revert to its pre-1890 status as a territory. And the original design was provided not by James King but by an architect in Chicago, the location of Marshall Field's Wholesale Store designed by Henry Hobson Richardson. King became the architect amid concern that Boise City did not have resources to construct the Chicago design.

After construction, Boise City National Bank occupied the building from March 26, 1892, until August 1, 1932. On that day the bank failed to open, and its assets and liabilities were placed with the Comptroller of the Currency.

Other tenants of the building in 1892 included the United States district court, the United States Marshals Service, and the United States Surveyor General's office.

== See also ==
- Downtown Boise
- Causes of the Great Depression
