= Benjamin Watlington House =

- U.S. National Register of Historic Places
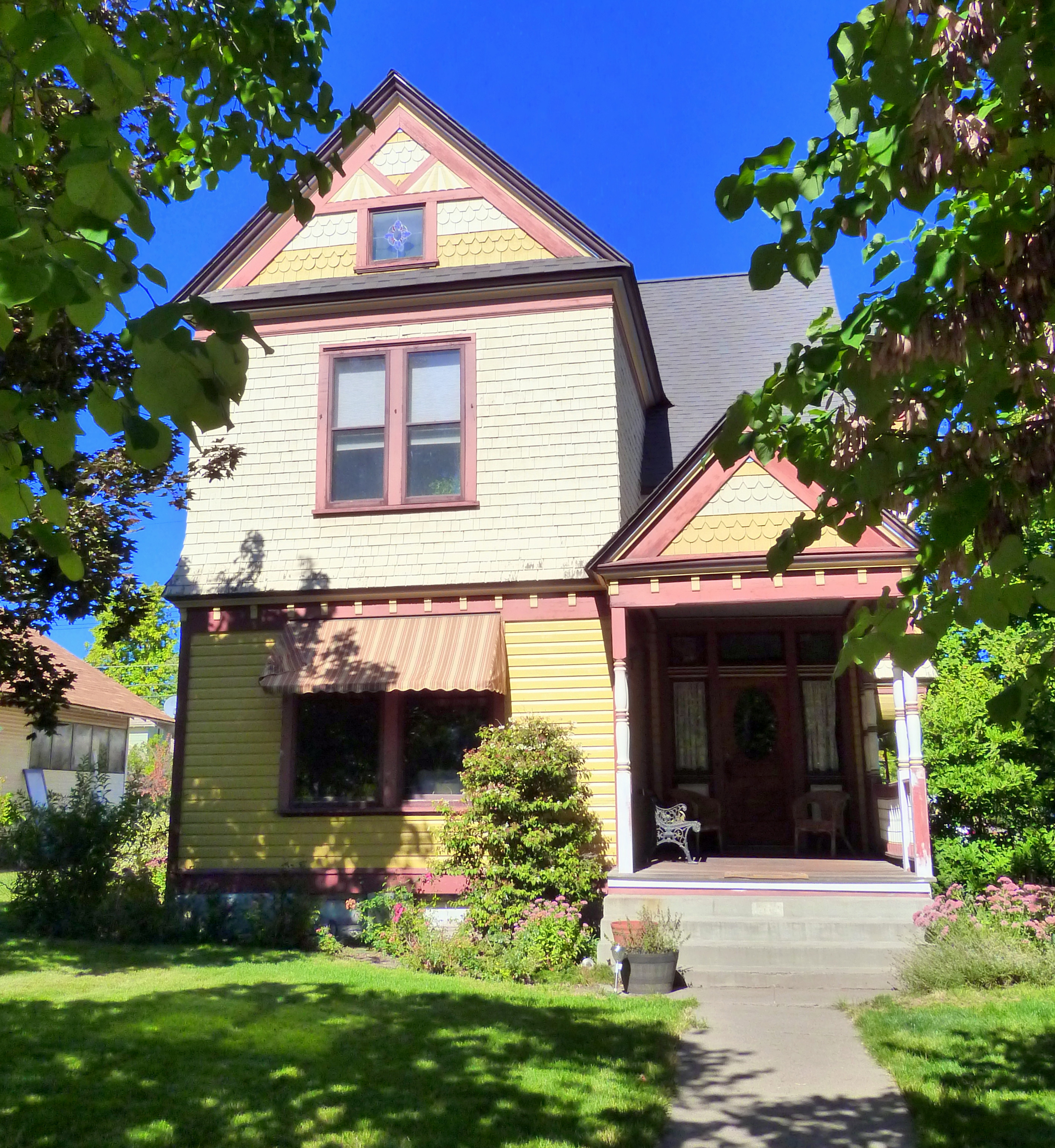

- Location within Idaho Location within the United States
- Location: 206 W. Court St., Weiser, Idaho
- Coordinates: 44°14′53″N 116°58′20″W
- Area: less than one acre
- Built: 1890
- Architect: James King
- Architectural style: Queen Anne
- NRHP reference No.: 91000458
- Added to NRHP: April 26, 1991

The Benjamin Watlington House, at 206 W. Court St. in Weiser, Idaho, was built in 1890. It was listed on the National Register of Historic Places in 1991.

It is a two-story wood-frame house which was deemed "architecturally important as an example of the Queen Anne style and as the work of James King, Idaho's first architect with professional training."
