= Roger Batzel =

American nuclear scientist

Roger E. Batzel
- Born: December 1, 1921; Weiser, Idaho
- Died: July 29, 2000 (aged 78); San Ramon, California
- Resting place: Queen of Heaven Cemetery; Lafayette, California
- Education: University of Idaho (B.S.Ch.E. 1947); University of California (Ph.D. 1951)
- Known for: Nuclear weapons
- Spouse: Edwina Grindstaff Batzel
- Children: 1 son, 2 daughters
- Scientific career
- Fields: Nuclear chemistry
- Workplaces: Director (1971–1988); Lawrence Livermore Laboratory
- Doctoral advisor: Glenn T. Seaborg
- Military career
- Allegiance: United States
- Branch: U.S. Army Air Forces
- Unit: Navigation training
- Conflicts: World War II (stateside)

Roger Elwood Batzel (December 1, 1921 – July 29, 2000) was an American nuclear scientist, best known as the director of the Lawrence Livermore National Laboratory for over sixteen years, from 1971 to 1988.

== Early years ==
Born and raised in Weiser, Idaho, Batzel graduated from Weiser High School in 1940 and enrolled at the University of Idaho in Moscow. He left college during World War II to serve in the U.S. Army Air Forces as a navigation instructor, then returned to UI and earned a bachelor's degree in chemical engineering in 1947.

Batzel worked for General Electric for a year at nearby Hanford, Washington, then attended graduate school at the University of California, Berkeley. He earned a Ph.D. in nuclear chemistry in 1951, studying under Dr. Glenn T. Seaborg, a Nobel Prize winner that same year. Batzel then worked as a senior chemist for California Research and Development Co.

== Lawrence Livermore ==
Batzel joined the University of California Radiation Laboratory at Livermore in its second year in 1953 as an assistant division leader with the chemistry department, and became its head in 1959. (Shortly after Ernest Lawrence's death in August 1958, the Berkeley and Livermore labs were renamed "Lawrence Radiation Laboratory.")

In 1961, Batzel became associate director of chemistry and was also named associate director of nuclear testing, a position he held until 1964. He was associate director of chemistry and space reactors from 1966 to 1968 and associate director of chemistry and biomedical research in 1969.

Batzel was appointed as the newly renamed Lawrence Livermore Laboratory's sixth director on December 1, 1971, his 50th birthday. He was its longest-serving director and was one of the nation's leading authorities on nuclear weapons, advising four U.S. presidents. Under his guidance, the Laboratory broadened its mission from primarily nuclear weapons to many areas of applied science, and he stepped down in April 1988 at age 66.

== Death ==
Batzel suffered a major heart attack in July 2000 at age 78 and died several days later in a San Ramon hospital. Later that year, the Laboratory dedicated Building 132, the national security building, in Batzel's memory for his "legacy of excellence in support of national security."

== Personal ==
Batzel was married to Edwina (Grindstaff) Batzel (b. 1926) for 54 years and they had three children, a son and two daughters. He is buried at Queen of Heaven Cemetery in Lafayette, California.
