= Weiser High School =

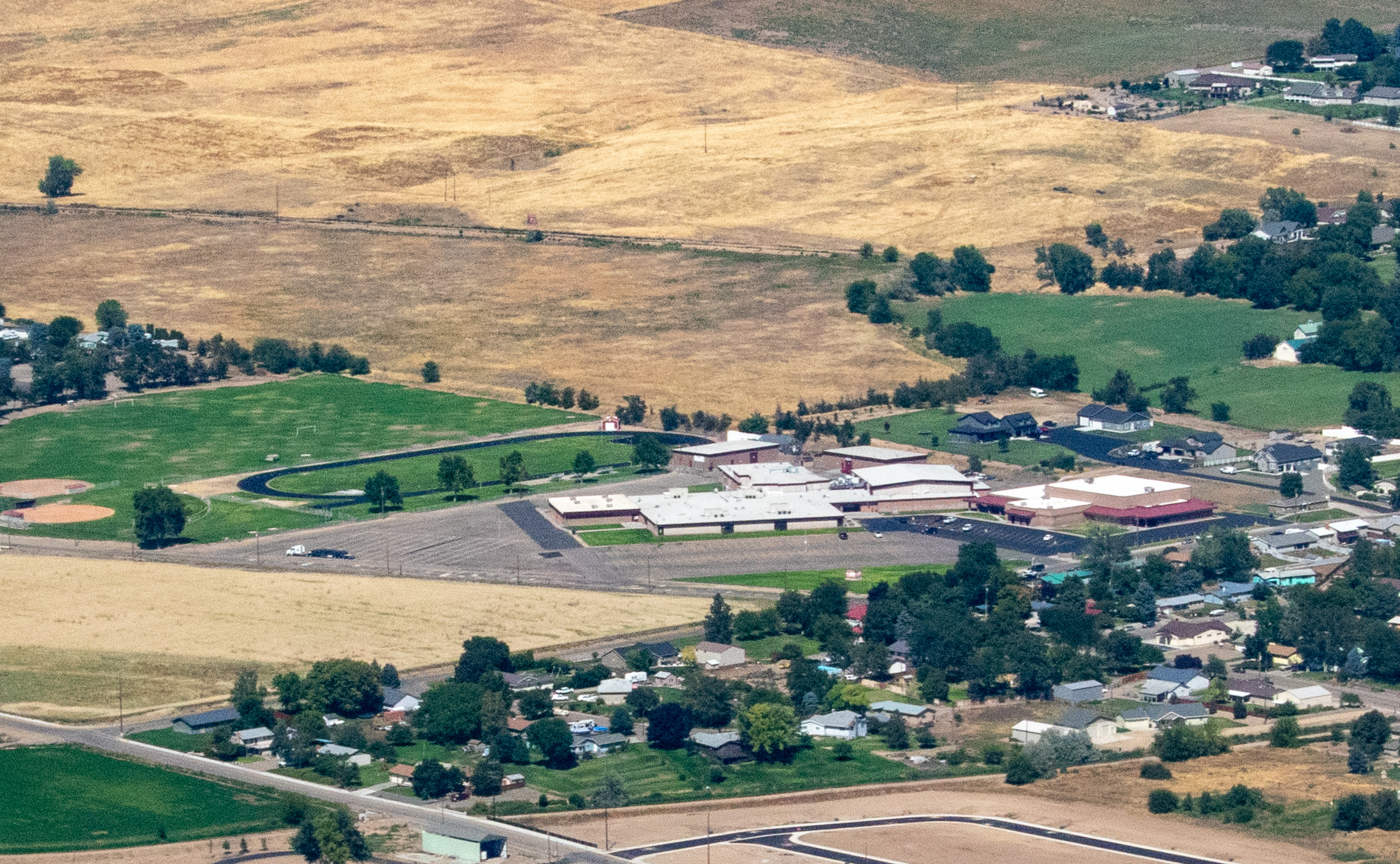
- Weiser High School

Location
- 690 West Indianhead Road; Weiser, Idaho 83672; United States; 44.261°N 116.979°W

Information
- Type: Public
- Superintendent: Patrick Wilson
- Principal: Drew Dickerson
- Faculty: 30
- Grades: 9–12
- Enrollment: 529 (2023-2024)
- Colors: Red & White
- Mascot: Wolverine
- IHSAA Division: 3A
- Website: Weiser High School

Weiser High School is the only high school in Weiser, Idaho. It is in the Weiser School District, which includes Weiser and some unincorporated areas. In 2006, it had an enrollment of 514 in grades 9–12. Every June, it hosts the National Oldtime Fiddlers' Contest & Festival.

As of 1998 the school takes students who live in Annex, Oregon.

== History ==
The Idaho Statesman counted the start of the school as 1867, when the first school in Weiser was established. In 1904, a dedicated building for the high school was built for $40,000. Renovation and expansion worth $90,000 began to be built in 1919. In 1948 it took over the former Weiser Academy/Intermountain Institute, a boarding school with 750-acre (300 ha) of land. According to The Idaho Statesman, this meant that it was the sole high school in the state with a large property.

In 1958, there were 46 students at Weiser High who lived in the Annex and Jefferson school districts.

In 1965 there was a proposal for a bond to spend $1,147,000 to build a new high school, using a hexagon-style design. That year, the state was considering pulling the accreditation of the school.

== Operations ==
As of 2017 all students register for classes in person instead of electronically. Dave Davies, the former principal, stated that this is done to give a "personal touch" to the school.

The school has various dual high school-tertiary credit courses. In 2017, 121 students graduated. 40% of them went to a tertiary institution straight out of high school.

== Athletics and clubs ==
The following sports are offered at Weiser High School:

- Baseball (boys)
- Basketball (boys and girls)
- Cross Country (coed)
- American football (boys)
- Golf (coed)
- Soccer (boys and girls)
- Softball (girls)
- Tennis (coed)
- Track (coed)
- Volleyball (girls)
- Wrestling (boys and girls)

State championships include:

- Baseball (2021)
- 3A, American football (2021)

There is also a band. The band initially had female students twirling batons while the male students played instruments. By 1961, all students were playing instruments. That year, the band won third place in a contest in the Seafair Parade in Seattle, as well as first place in another competition in the same event. The Idaho Statesman described the group as "one of the top-rate organizations of its kind in the area" after the parade.

== Notable alumni ==
- Donald Anderson - Idaho Supreme Court justice (1955–56)
- Herman Welker - U.S. Senator from Idaho (1951–57). Class of 1924
- Roger Batzel - Director (1971–88) of Lawrence Livermore National Laboratory. Class of 1940
- Harold L. Ryan - U.S. District Judge - District of Idaho (1981–95). Class of 1941.
