= Washington County Courthouse (Idaho) =

- U.S. National Register of Historic Places
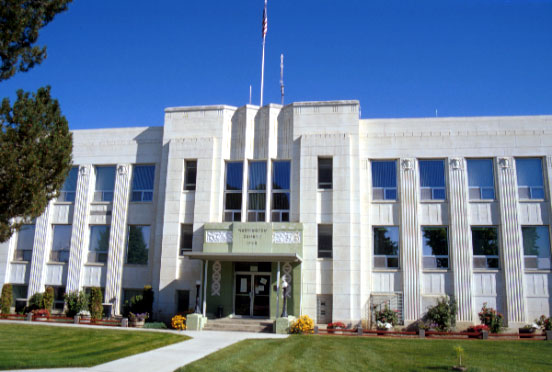
- Washington County Courthouse, August 1998

- Location within Idaho Location within the United States
- Location: 256 East Court Street; Weiser, Idaho
- Coordinates: 44°14′51″N 116°57′59″W
- Area: less than one acre
- Built: 1939
- Built by: J.F. Ulmer and Works Progress Administration
- Architect: Tourtellotte & Hummel
- Architectural style: Moderne or Art Deco
- MPS: County Courthouses in Idaho MPS
- NRHP reference No.: 87001602
- Added to NRHP: September 28, 1987

The Washington County Courthouse is an historic governmental building located at 256 East Court in Weiser, Idaho. Designed in the Moderne or Art Deco styles of architecture by architects Tourtellotte and Hummel, it was built in 1939 by contractor J.F. Ulmer. On September 28, 1987, it was added to the National Register of Historic Places

It was built to replace the previous courthouse which was destroyed by a February 1938 fire. The Works Progress Administration provided labor and the county provided materials. The WPA laborers were directed by Boise builder J. F. Ulmer. It was substantially completed in fall of 1939 and dedicated on December 1, but the application of a sprayed veneer of paint and fine sand to finish the building was not accomplished until the following spring.
