= Midvale, Idaho =

- City
- Location of Midvale in Washington County, Idaho.
- Coordinates: 44°27′28″N 116°44′56″W
- Country: United States
- State: Idaho
- County: Washington

Area
  - Total: 2.64 sq mi (6.84 km^{2})
  - Land: 2.57 sq mi (6.66 km^{2})
  - Water: 0.069 sq mi (0.18 km^{2})
- Elevation: 2,543 ft (775 m)

Population (2020)
  - Total: 193
  - Density: 75.1/sq mi (29.0/km^{2})
- Time zone: UTC-7 (Mountain (MST))
  - Summer (DST): UTC-6 (MDT)
- ZIP code: 83645
- Area code: 208
- FIPS code: 16-52750
- GNIS feature ID: 2411098
- Website: midvaleidaho.org

Midvale is a city in Washington County, Idaho, United States. The population was 171 at the 2010 census, rising to 193 as of 2020.

== History ==
The city was named when the valley in which it stands was called Middle Valley. The first settlers came in 1868 (The Keithley and Towell families) and in 1876 a post office and school were begun. In 1884 the Middle Valley Ditch was undertaken: in 1885 the first store was built, and in 1898 the P&IN Rail Road came through. From 1870 to 1900 stock raising was the chief industry, but today Midvale serves a diversified farming area. Midvale is the hometown of former U.S. Senator Larry Craig.

== Geography ==
According to the United States Census Bureau, the city has a total area of 2.87 square miles (7.43 km^{2}), of which 2.79 square miles (7.23 km^{2}) is land and 0.08 square miles (0.21 km^{2}) is water.

== Demographics ==
Historical population
Census	Pop.	Note	%±
1920	278		—
1930	203		−27.0%
1940	262		29.1%
1950	231		−11.8%
1960	211		−8.7%
1970	176		−16.6%
1980	205		16.5%
1990	110		−46.3%
2000	176		60.0%
2010	171		−2.8%
2020	193		12.9%
U.S. Decennial Census

As of the census of 2010, there were 171 people, 77 households, and 50 families residing in the city. The population density was 61.3 inhabitants per square mile (23.7/km^{2}). There were 100 housing units at an average density of 35.8 per square mile (13.8/km^{2}). The racial makeup of the city was 94.2% White, 4.1% Native American, 0.6% from other races, and 1.2% from two or more races. Hispanic or Latino of any race were 5.8% of the population.

There were 77 households, of which 15.6% had children under the age of 18 living with them, 55.8% were married couples living together, 3.9% had a female householder with no husband present, 5.2% had a male householder with no wife present, and 35.1% were non-families. 26.0% of all households were made up of individuals, and 13% had someone living alone who was 65 years of age or older. The average household size was 2.22 and the average family size was 2.56.

The median age in the city was 53.3 years. 13.5% of residents were under the age of 18; 7% were between the ages of 18 and 24; 16.4% were from 25 to 44; 33.9% were from 45 to 64; and 29.2% were 65 years of age or older. The gender makeup of the city was 49.7% male and 50.3% female.

== Education ==
It is in the Midvale School District 433.

Washington County is in the area (but not the taxing region) of the College of Western Idaho, which has its main campus in Nampa.

== Notable people ==
- Judy Boyle, Idaho State Representative
- Larry Craig, former US senator for Idaho
