= Washington County, Idaho =

County in Idaho, United States

- County
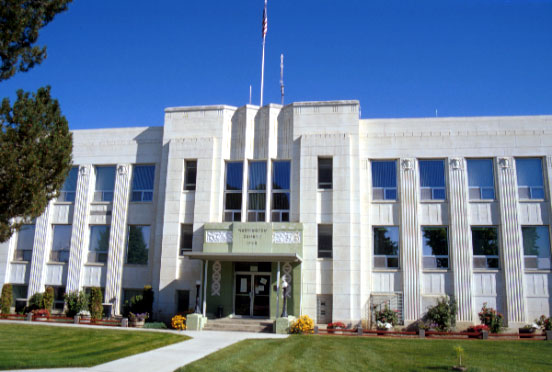
- Washington County Courthouse in Weiser

- Seal

- Location within the U.S. state of Idaho
- Coordinates: 44°27′N 116°47′W
- Country: United States
- State: Idaho
- Founded: February 20, 1879
- Named for: George Washington
- Seat: Weiser
- Largest city: Weiser

Area
  - Total: 1,474 sq mi (3,820 km^{2})
  - Land: 1,453 sq mi (3,760 km^{2})
  - Water: 21 sq mi (54 km^{2}) 1.4%

Population (2020)
  - Total: 10,500
  - Estimate (2025): 11,583 ▲
  - Density: 7.23/sq mi (2.79/km^{2})
- Time zone: UTC−7 (Mountain)
  - Summer (DST): UTC−6 (MDT)
- Congressional district: 1st
- Website: www.co.washington.id.us

Washington County is a county in the U.S. state of Idaho. As of the 2020 census, the population was 10,500. The county seat and largest city is Weiser, with over half of the county's population. The county was established in 1879 when Idaho was a territory and named after U.S. President George Washington.

== Geography ==
According to the U.S. Census Bureau, the county has a total area of 1,474 square miles (3,820 km^{2}), of which 1,453 square miles (3,760 km^{2}) is land and 21 square miles (54 km^{2}) (1.4%) is water.

=== Adjacent counties ===
- Adams County - north
- Gem County - east
- Payette County - south
- Malheur County, Oregon - southwest
- Baker County, Oregon - west

=== Major highways ===
- US 95
- SH-71

=== National protected areas ===
- Boise National Forest (part)
- Deer Flat National Wildlife Refuge (part)
- Payette National Forest (part)

=== Rivers ===
- Snake River
- Weiser River

=== Reservoirs ===
- Brownlee
- Crane Creek
- Mann Creek
- Paddock Valley

== Demographics ==
Historical population
Census	Pop.	Note	%±
1880	879		—
1890	3,836		336.4%
1900	6,882		79.4%
1910	11,101		61.3%
1920	9,424		−15.1%
1930	7,962		−15.5%
1940	8,853		11.2%
1950	8,576		−3.1%
1960	8,378		−2.3%
1970	7,633		−8.9%
1980	8,803		15.3%
1990	8,550		−2.9%
2000	9,977		16.7%
2010	10,198		2.2%
2020	10,500		3.0%
2025 (est.)	11,583	▲	10.3%
U.S. Decennial Census; 1790–1960, 1900–1990, 1990–2000, 2010

=== Racial and ethnic composition ===
Washington County, Idaho – Racial and ethnic composition Note: the US Census treats Hispanic/Latino as an ethnic category. This table excludes Latinos from the racial categories and assigns them to a separate category. Hispanics/Latinos may be of any race.
Race / Ethnicity (NH = Non-Hispanic)	Pop 1980	Pop 1990	Pop 2000	Pop 2010	Pop 2020	% 1980	% 1990	% 2000	% 2010	% 2020
White alone (NH)	8,001	7,454	8,294	8,166	8,118	90.89%	87.18%	83.13%	80.07%	77.31%
Black or African American alone (NH)	2	6	10	10	17	0.02%	0.07%	0.10%	0.10%	0.16%
Native American or Alaska Native alone (NH)	32	45	42	75	74	0.36%	0.53%	0.42%	0.74%	0.70%
Asian alone (NH)	134	123	103	90	81	1.52%	1.44%	1.03%	0.88%	0.77%
Native Hawaiian or Pacific Islander alone (NH)	x	x	3	3	7	x	x	0.03%	0.03%	0.07%
Other race alone (NH)	18	7	19	12	53	0.20%	0.08%	0.19%	0.12%	0.50%
Mixed race or Multiracial (NH)	x	x	134	126	488	x	x	1.34%	1.24%	4.65%
Hispanic or Latino (any race)	616	915	1,372	1,716	1,662	7.00%	10.70%	13.75%	16.83%	15.83%
Total	8,803	8,550	9,977	10,198	10,500	100.00%	100.00%	100.00%	100.00%	100.00%

=== 2020 census ===
As of the 2020 census, the county had a population of 10,500 and a median age of 46.0 years. 23.4% of residents were under the age of 18 and 26.0% of residents were 65 years of age or older. For every 100 females there were 96.8 males, and for every 100 females age 18 and over there were 95.0 males age 18 and over.

The 2020 census recorded 4,087 households in the county, of which 28.7% had children under the age of 18 living with them and 22.9% had a female householder with no spouse or partner present. About 25.0% of all households were made up of individuals and 14.2% had someone living alone who was 65 years of age or older.

The 2020 census recorded 4,514 housing units, of which 9.5% were vacant. Among occupied housing units, 75.2% were owner-occupied and 24.8% were renter-occupied. The homeowner vacancy rate was 1.4% and the rental vacancy rate was 3.5%.

The racial makeup recorded by the 2020 census was 81.6% White, 0.2% Black or African American, 1.1% American Indian and Alaska Native, 0.8% Asian, 0.1% Native Hawaiian and Pacific Islander, 7.6% from some other race, and 8.6% from two or more races. Hispanic or Latino residents of any race comprised 15.8% of the population.

The 2020 census reported that 52.4% of residents lived in urban areas, while 47.6% lived in rural areas.

=== 2010 census ===
As of the 2010 United States census, there were 10,198 people, 4,034 households, and 2,803 families living in the county. The population density was 7.0 inhabitants per square mile (2.7/km^{2}). There were 4,529 housing units at an average density of 3.1 units per square mile (1.2 units/km^{2}). The racial makeup of the county was 86.6% white, 1.0% American Indian, 0.9% Asian, 0.2% black or African American, 9.1% from other races, and 2.2% from two or more races. Those of Hispanic or Latino origin made up 16.8% of the population. In terms of ancestry, 20.0% were English, 18.2% were German, 14.8% were Irish, and 9.6% were American.

Of the 4,034 households, 30.4% had children under the age of 18 living with them, 54.9% were married couples living together, 9.7% had a female householder with no husband present, 30.5% were non-families, and 25.8% of all households were made up of individuals. The average household size was 2.50 and the average family size was 2.99. The median age was 43.6 years.

The median income for a household in the county was $30,625, and the median income for a family was $35,542. Males had a median income of $27,222 versus $18,053 for females. The per capita income for the county was $15,464. About 10.00% of families and 13.30% of the population were below the poverty line, including 16.60% of those under age 18 and 9.90% of those age 65 or over.

== Education ==
The county is served by three school districts based in the county:

- Weiser District #431
  - Weiser High School
  - Weiser Middle School
  - Park Intermediate School
  - Pioneer Primary School.
- Cambridge Joint District #432
  - Cambridge Junior-Senior High School
  - Cambridge Elementary School
- Midvale District #433
  - Midvale Senior High School.
  - Midvale Junior High School
  - Midvale Elementary School

Additionally Payette Joint School District 371 includes a portion of Washington County.

Washington County is in the area (but not the taxing region) of the College of Western Idaho, which has its main campus in Nampa.

== Communities ==
=== Cities ===
- Cambridge
- Midvale
- Weiser

== Politics ==
United States presidential election results for Washington County, Idaho
Year	Republican		Democratic		Third party(ies)	
Year	No.	%	No.	%	No.	%
1892	317	36.15%	0	0.00%	560	63.85%
1896	204	19.62%	828	79.62%	8	0.77%
1900	1,194	46.95%	1,349	53.05%	0	0.00%
1904	1,894	60.69%	931	29.83%	296	9.48%
1908	1,819	51.56%	1,452	41.16%	257	7.28%
1912	724	25.32%	1,065	37.25%	1,070	37.43%
1916	1,545	44.43%	1,802	51.83%	130	3.74%
1920	1,864	59.59%	1,264	40.41%	0	0.00%
1924	1,183	41.33%	623	21.77%	1,056	36.90%
1928	1,973	66.39%	974	32.77%	25	0.84%
1932	1,213	34.65%	2,122	60.61%	166	4.74%
1936	1,234	34.70%	2,147	60.38%	175	4.92%
1940	1,903	45.27%	2,296	54.61%	5	0.12%
1944	2,002	51.95%	1,849	47.98%	3	0.08%
1948	1,713	49.21%	1,700	48.84%	68	1.95%
1952	2,616	64.91%	1,411	35.01%	3	0.07%
1956	2,272	57.89%	1,653	42.11%	0	0.00%
1960	2,251	55.86%	1,779	44.14%	0	0.00%
1964	1,730	46.99%	1,952	53.01%	0	0.00%
1968	2,020	57.65%	1,033	29.48%	451	12.87%
1972	2,264	61.99%	935	25.60%	453	12.40%
1976	2,044	53.47%	1,693	44.28%	86	2.25%
1980	2,915	63.58%	1,421	30.99%	249	5.43%
1984	3,015	71.99%	1,119	26.72%	54	1.29%
1988	2,380	61.98%	1,359	35.39%	101	2.63%
1992	1,802	42.09%	1,122	26.21%	1,357	31.70%
1996	2,318	54.90%	1,314	31.12%	590	13.97%
2000	2,899	71.23%	980	24.08%	191	4.69%
2004	3,274	75.11%	1,033	23.70%	52	1.19%
2008	3,168	70.31%	1,241	27.54%	97	2.15%
2012	3,128	72.22%	1,104	25.49%	99	2.29%
2016	3,283	73.69%	776	17.42%	396	8.89%
2020	4,154	77.70%	1,073	20.07%	119	2.23%
2024	4,429	79.73%	1,010	18.18%	116	2.09%

== Healthcare ==
The county is served by the Southwest Idaho Health District.

== See also ==
- National Register of Historic Places listings in Washington County, Idaho
