= Cambridge, Idaho =

- City
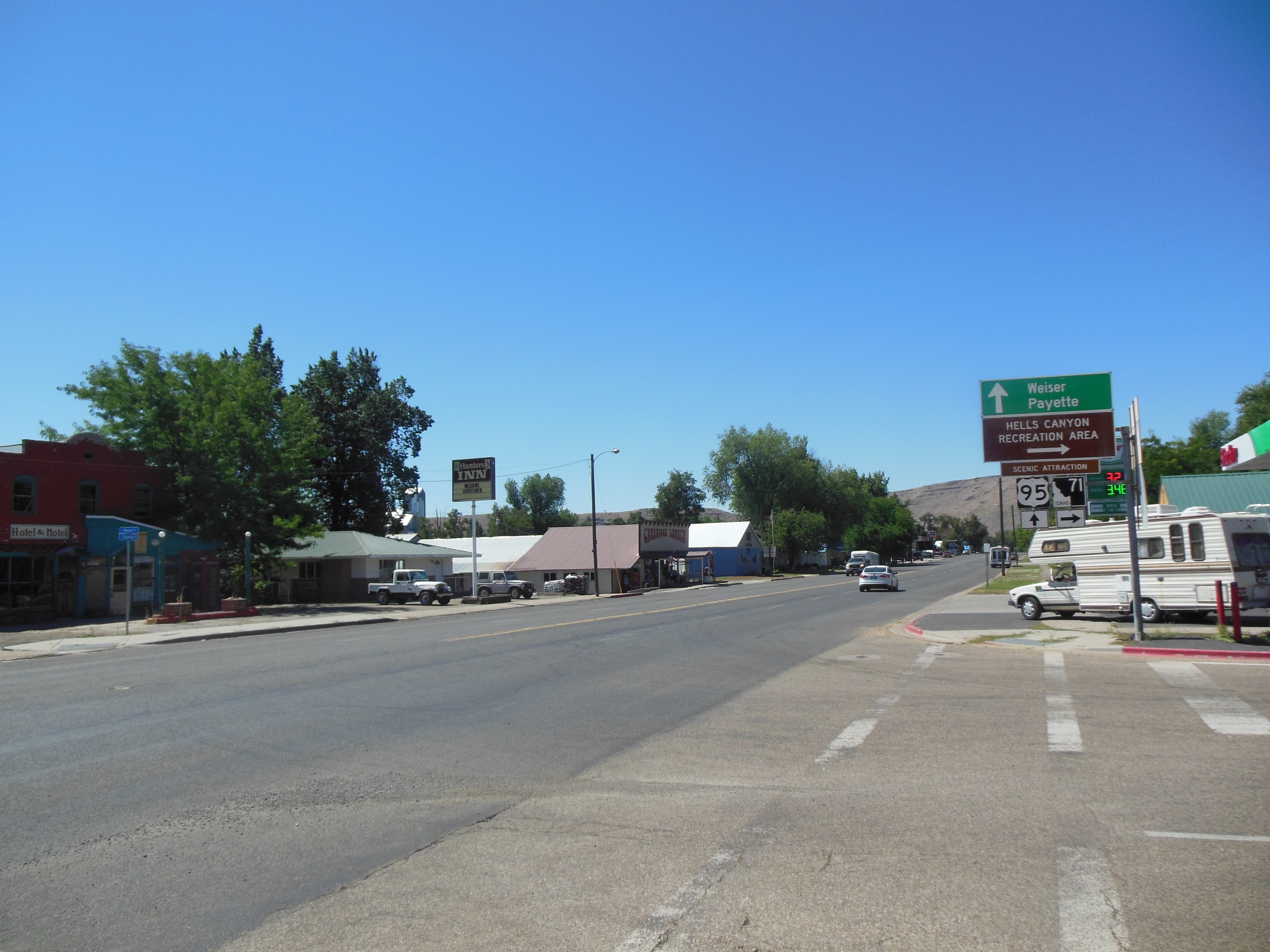
- Superior Street in Cambridge, Idaho

- Location of Cambridge in Washington County, Idaho.
- Coordinates: 44°34′19″N 116°40′40″W
- Country: United States
- State: Idaho
- County: Washington

Area
  - Total: 0.50 sq mi (1.29 km^{2})
  - Land: 0.48 sq mi (1.25 km^{2})
  - Water: 0.015 sq mi (0.04 km^{2})
- Elevation: 2,661 ft (811 m)

Population (2020)
  - Total: 335
  - Density: 661.3/sq mi (255.34/km^{2})
- Time zone: UTC−7 (Mountain (MST))
  - Summer (DST): UTC−6 (MDT)
- ZIP code: 83610
- Area codes: 208, 986
- FIPS code: 16-12520
- GNIS feature ID: 2409968
- Website: www.cambridge.id.gov

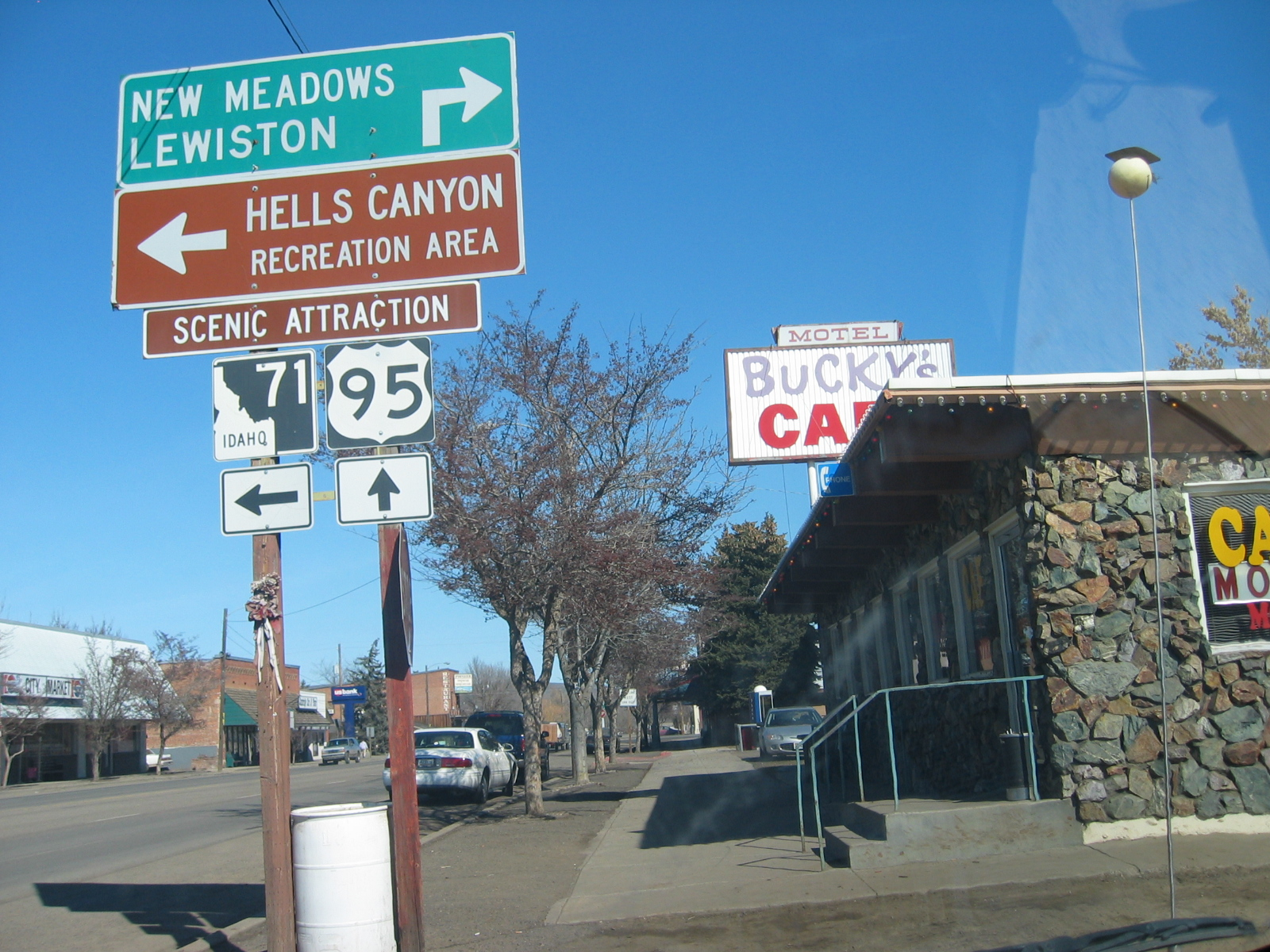
Road signs at an intersection of U.S. Route 95 northbound at the town of Cambridge.

Cambridge is a city in Washington County, Idaho, United States. The population was 335 at the 2020 census, up from 328 at the 2010 census. It is the second-largest city in the county, behind the significantly larger Weiser, the county seat.

== Geography ==
According to the United States Census Bureau, the city has a total area of 0.49 square miles (1.27 km^{2}), of which, 0.48 square miles (1.24 km^{2}) is land and 0.01 square miles (0.03 km^{2}) is water.

=== Climate ===
Cambridge has a hot-summer mediterranean continental climate (Köppen climate classification Dsa), with cold, moist winters, gradual springs, hot and dry summers, and brief autumns. July is the hottest month, with a daily average of 74.3 °F (23.5 °C); highs reach 100 °F (38 °C) on 14.4 days in a typical year and 90 °F (32 °C) on 61.7 days. Yet because of the aridity, summer nights typically cool to below 60 °F (16 °C). January is the coldest month, with a daily average of 23.3 °F (−4.8 °C), and lows falling to 0 °F (−18 °C) or below on 9.6 nights per year. Snowfall averages 33 inches (84 cm) per season. Precipitation is usually infrequent and light, especially so during the summer months. Extremes have ranged from −35 °F (−37 °C) on December 13, 1919 to 117 °F (47 °C), recorded July 29, 1934.

Climate data for Cambridge, Idaho, 1991–2020 normals, extremes 1894–2022
Month	Jan	Feb	Mar	Apr	May	Jun	Jul	Aug	Sep	Oct	Nov	Dec	Year
Record high °F (°C)	58 (14)	65 (18)	78 (26)	99 (37)	101 (38)	112 (44)	117 (47)	111 (44)	110 (43)	95 (35)	73 (23)	65 (18)	117 (47)
Mean maximum °F (°C)	43.6 (6.4)	50.7 (10.4)	66.6 (19.2)	78.3 (25.7)	89.1 (31.7)	96.9 (36.1)	104.4 (40.2)	103.2 (39.6)	95.7 (35.4)	80.3 (26.8)	59.6 (15.3)	47.1 (8.4)	105.1 (40.6)
Mean daily maximum °F (°C)	29.7 (−1.3)	37.0 (2.8)	50.8 (10.4)	61.6 (16.4)	71.7 (22.1)	80.3 (26.8)	92.5 (33.6)	91.6 (33.1)	80.3 (26.8)	62.6 (17.0)	43.9 (6.6)	31.6 (−0.2)	61.1 (16.2)
Daily mean °F (°C)	23.4 (−4.8)	28.8 (−1.8)	39.9 (4.4)	48.4 (9.1)	57.0 (13.9)	64.7 (18.2)	74.3 (23.5)	72.6 (22.6)	62.2 (16.8)	48.5 (9.2)	35.0 (1.7)	25.3 (−3.7)	48.3 (9.1)
Mean daily minimum °F (°C)	17.0 (−8.3)	20.5 (−6.4)	29.1 (−1.6)	35.2 (1.8)	42.3 (5.7)	49.0 (9.4)	56.1 (13.4)	53.7 (12.1)	44.1 (6.7)	34.3 (1.3)	26.0 (−3.3)	19.1 (−7.2)	35.5 (2.0)
Mean minimum °F (°C)	−6.8 (−21.6)	2.1 (−16.6)	14.0 (−10.0)	22.6 (−5.2)	28.3 (−2.1)	35.7 (2.1)	44.4 (6.9)	41.6 (5.3)	31.1 (−0.5)	20.2 (−6.6)	9.2 (−12.7)	−0.4 (−18.0)	−9.9 (−23.3)
Record low °F (°C)	−34 (−37)	−31 (−35)	−11 (−24)	10 (−12)	21 (−6)	27 (−3)	29 (−2)	28 (−2)	17 (−8)	2 (−17)	−24 (−31)	−35 (−37)	−35 (−37)
Average precipitation inches (mm)	3.24 (82)	2.40 (61)	2.26 (57)	1.57 (40)	1.81 (46)	1.29 (33)	0.38 (9.7)	0.32 (8.1)	0.57 (14)	1.30 (33)	2.40 (61)	3.86 (98)	21.40 (544)
Average snowfall inches (cm)	11.6 (29)	5.0 (13)	0.9 (2.3)	trace	0.0 (0.0)	0.0 (0.0)	0.0 (0.0)	0.0 (0.0)	0.0 (0.0)	trace	4.0 (10)	9.6 (24)	31.1 (78.3)
Average extreme snow depth inches (cm)	10 (25)	7 (18)	1 (2.5)	0 (0)	0 (0)	0 (0)	0 (0)	0 (0)	0 (0)	0 (0)	0 (0)	6 (15)	10 (25)
Average precipitation days (≥ 0.01 in)	10.4	8.8	10.3	8.6	7.9	6.0	2.3	2.1	3.3	6.4	10.2	12.2	88.5
Average relative humidity (%)	86	82	71	59	53	48	33	32	39	56	70	82	59
Mean monthly sunshine hours	155	194.9	235.6	279	341	342	372	347.2	285	248	189	151.9	3,140.6
Mean daily sunshine hours	5	6.9	7.6	9.3	11	11.4	12	11.2	9.5	8	6.3	4.9	8.6
Mean daily daylight hours	9.3	10.5	12	13.5	14.8	15.5	15.2	14	12.5	10.9	9.5	8.9	12.2
Source 1: NOAA
Source 2: National Weather Service(snow 1981-2010), Weather Atlas(humidity-sun-daylight)

== Demographics ==
Historical population
Census	Pop.	Note	%±
1910	349		—
1920	404		15.8%
1930	336		−16.8%
1940	405		20.5%
1950	354		−12.6%
1960	473		33.6%
1970	383		−19.0%
1980	428		11.7%
1990	374		−12.6%
2000	360		−3.7%
2010	328		−8.9%
2020	335		2.1%
2019 (est.)	320		−2.4%
U.S. Decennial Census

=== 2010 census ===
As of the census of 2010, there were 328 people, 151 households, and 100 families residing in the city. The population density was 683.3 inhabitants per square mile (263.8/km^{2}). There were 178 housing units at an average density of 370.8 per square mile (143.2/km^{2}). The racial makeup of the city was 98.2% White, 0.6% Native American, and 1.2% from two or more races. Hispanic or Latino of any race were 0.3% of the population.

There were 151 households, of which 25.2% had children under the age of 18 living with them, 52.3% were married couples living together, 8.6% had a female householder with no husband present, 5.3% had a male householder with no wife present, and 33.8% were non-families. 33.1% of all households were made up of individuals, and 14.5% had someone living alone who was 65 years of age or older. The average household size was 2.17 and the average family size was 2.68.

The median age in the city was 47.1 years. 21.6% of residents were under the age of 18; 5.9% were between the ages of 18 and 24; 20.2% were from 25 to 44; 29.5% were from 45 to 64; and 22.9% were 65 years of age or older. The gender makeup of the city was 50.0% male and 50.0% female.

=== 2000 census ===
As of the census of 2000, there were 360 people, 152 households, and 100 families residing in the city. The population density was 1,270.6 inhabitants per square mile (490.6/km^{2}). There were 173 housing units at an average density of 610.6 per square mile (235.8/km^{2}). The racial makeup of the city was 98.33% White, 0.28% Native American, 0.83% from other races, and 0.56% from two or more races.

There were 152 households, out of which 24.3% had children under the age of 18 living with them, 55.9% were married couples living together, 7.9% had a female householder with no husband present, and 33.6% were non-families. 30.9% of all households were made up of individuals, and 13.8% had someone living alone who was 65 years of age or older. The average household size was 2.37 and the average family size was 2.97.

In the city, the population was spread out, with 24.2% under the age of 18, 5.6% from 18 to 24, 20.3% from 25 to 44, 28.3% from 45 to 64, and 21.7% who were 65 years of age or older. The median age was 45 years. For every 100 females, there were 96.7 males. For every 100 females age 18 and over, there were 85.7 males.

The median income for a household in the city was $22,386, and the median income for a family was $31,111. Males had a median income of $25,000 versus $15,000 for females. The per capita income for the city was $14,475. About 7.8% of families and 10.9% of the population were below the poverty line, including 12.9% of those under age 18 and 7.0% of those age 65 or over.

== Notable people ==
- Herman Welker, former US Senator for Idaho

== Transportation ==
=== Highways ===
- - US 95
- - SH-71

The city is served by U.S. Highway 95, connecting to Council and New Meadows to the north and Weiser and Payette to the south. State Highway 71 heads northwest from Cambridge to the Brownlee Dam on the Snake River.

== Education ==
It is in the Cambridge Joint School District 432.

Washington County is in the area (but not the taxing region) of the College of Western Idaho, which has its main campus in Nampa.
