= Weiser, Idaho =

- City
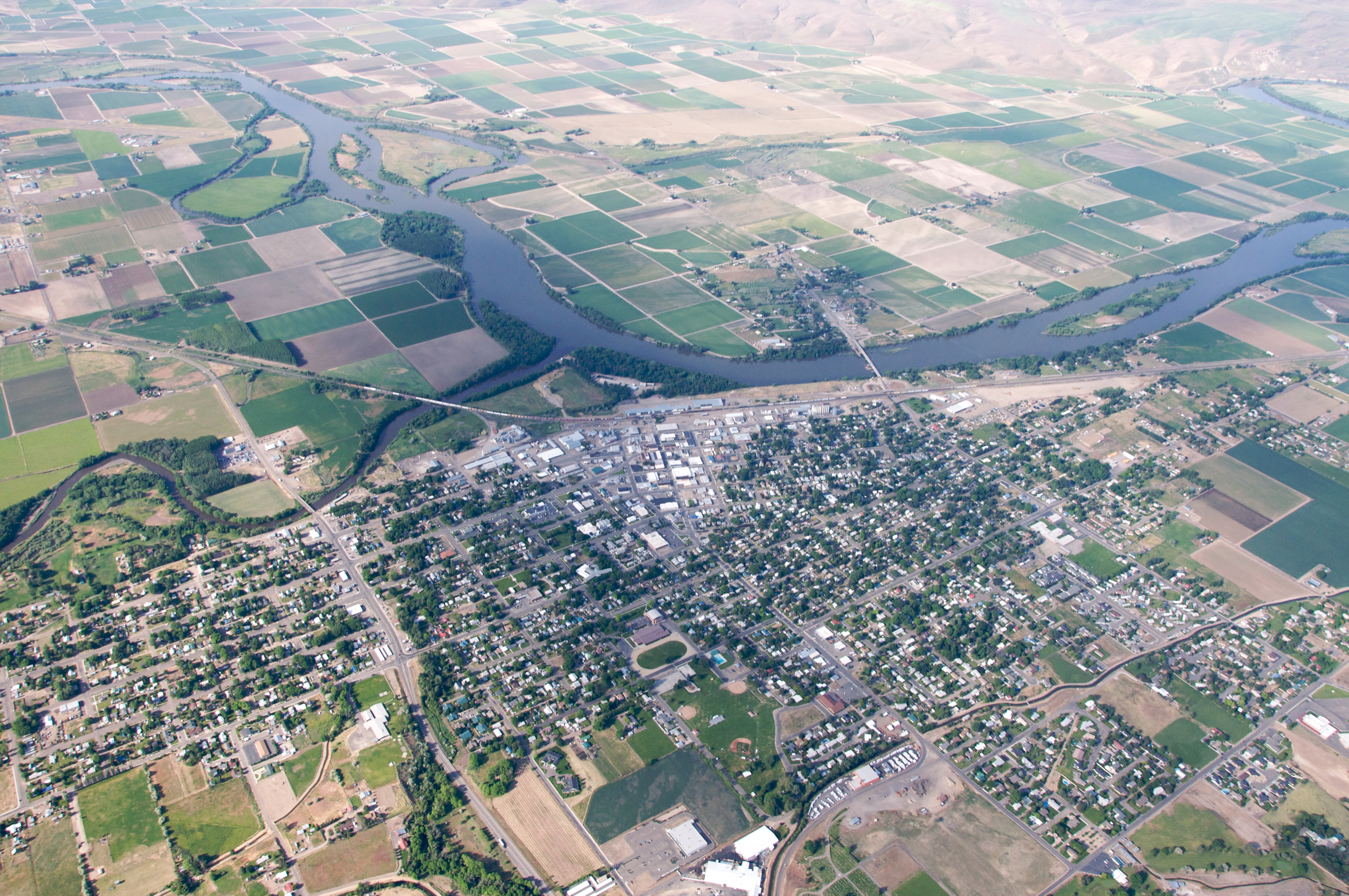
- Weiser in May 2009

- Location of Weiser in Washington County, Idaho.

- Location in the United States
- Coordinates: 44°15′02″N 116°57′52″W
- Country: United States
- State: Idaho
- County: Washington

Area
  - Total: 2.99 sq mi (7.75 km^{2})
  - Land: 2.98 sq mi (7.72 km^{2})
  - Water: 0.012 sq mi (0.03 km^{2})
- Elevation: 2,149 ft (655 m)

Population (2020)
  - Total: 5,630
  - Density: 1,803.2/sq mi (696.22/km^{2})
- Time zone: UTC−7 (Mountain (MST))
  - Summer (DST): UTC−6 (MDT)
- ZIP code: 83672
- Area code: 208, 986
- FIPS code: 16-86140
- GNIS feature ID: 2412206
- Website: cityofweiser.net

Weiser (/ˈwiːzər/ WEE-zər) is a city in and the county seat of Washington County, Idaho. The city supports farm, orchard, and livestock industries. The city sits at the confluence of the Weiser River with the Snake River, which marks the border with Oregon. As of the 2020 census, Weiser had a population of 5,630.

== History ==
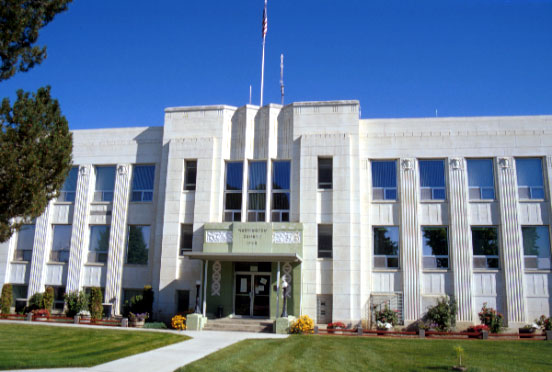
Washington County Courthouse

The city was named after the nearby Weiser River, but who the river was named for is not known. One version claims it is for Peter M. Weiser, a soldier and member of the Lewis and Clark Expedition. Another has it for Jacob Weiser, a trapper-turned-miner who struck it rich in Baboon Gulch in the Florence Basin of Idaho in 1861.

William Logan and his wife Nancy were the first white settlers in the vicinity of Weiser in 1863. They built a roadhouse in anticipation of the opening of Olds Ferry west of them on the Snake River across from Farewell Bend. In 1863, Reuben Olds acquired a franchise from the Territorial Legislature and began operating Olds Ferry. Olds's ferry business did well (as did Logan's) as it diverted much of the traffic from the old Snake River crossing point at Old Fort Boise. Increasing settlement on the Weiser River valley increased Weiser's population. A post office was established in 1866 as Weiser Ranch. In 1871, it was renamed Weiser.

Weiser reached its height of prosperity when a railroad station was established and it became a transportation hub. Its history is well represented by the great number of original buildings from the 1890s and early 1900s that are on the National Register of Historic Places.

Hall of Fame pitcher Walter Johnson played semi-pro baseball for the Weiser Kids as a young man in 1906–1907. After high school in Fullerton, California, the "Big Train" was lured to Weiser to play baseball and work for the local telephone company. While in Weiser, he once pitched 84 consecutive scoreless innings. His skills drew the attention of the Washington Nationals, who sent scout Cliff Blankenship to offer Johnson a contract, and in July 1907 he departed Idaho for the major leagues at age nineteen.

U.S. Route 95 runs through the city, connecting to Oregon and British Columbia.

== Culture ==
Weiser bills itself as the "Fiddling Capital of the World" and the National Oldtime Fiddlers' Contest has been held each year since 1953. Fiddling contests have been held in Weiser since 1914, but the present festival was the idea of Blaine Stubblefield, a fiddler and folk music collector, and the head of the city's chamber of commerce. The festival is held at the beginning of summer, during the third full week in June, the only exception occurring during leap years when it is held on the 4th week of the month. It draws national media coverage and over 7,000 people to the Weiser area.

The city has been consistently served by the Weiser Signal-American, the local weekly newspaper.

For many years Weiser's location as the last city upriver from Hells Canyon made it the jump-off point for wilderness tours by powered rubber raft down the gorge. Enormous sturgeon and plentiful salmon were a draw for anglers. The salmon runs ended not long after the float tours with the blocking of the river by three hydro-power dams built by Idaho Power Company starting in the 1950s.

== Geography ==
According to the United States Census Bureau, the city has a total area of 3.38 square miles (8.75 km^{2}), all of it land.

Unincorporated Annex, Oregon, sits across the Snake River.

=== Climate ===
Weiser experiences a semi-arid climate (Köppen BSk) with cold winters and hot, dry summers.

Climate data for Weiser, Idaho, 1991–2020 normals, extremes 1911–2012
Month	Jan	Feb	Mar	Apr	May	Jun	Jul	Aug	Sep	Oct	Nov	Dec	Year
Record high °F (°C)	65 (18)	67 (19)	83 (28)	93 (34)	104 (40)	110 (43)	115 (46)	110 (43)	107 (42)	97 (36)	73 (23)	64 (18)	115 (46)
Mean maximum °F (°C)	47.2 (8.4)	55.1 (12.8)	70.1 (21.2)	80.3 (26.8)	91.6 (33.1)	97.9 (36.6)	103.3 (39.6)	101.5 (38.6)	93.5 (34.2)	81.3 (27.4)	62.4 (16.9)	50.2 (10.1)	104.5 (40.3)
Mean daily maximum °F (°C)	36.2 (2.3)	44.4 (6.9)	56.7 (13.7)	64.3 (17.9)	74.4 (23.6)	83.5 (28.6)	94.5 (34.7)	91.8 (33.2)	80.8 (27.1)	65.1 (18.4)	48.0 (8.9)	36.8 (2.7)	64.7 (18.2)
Daily mean °F (°C)	29.4 (−1.4)	35.3 (1.8)	44.8 (7.1)	51.4 (10.8)	60.6 (15.9)	68.5 (20.3)	77.8 (25.4)	75.4 (24.1)	64.9 (18.3)	51.3 (10.7)	38.2 (3.4)	29.7 (−1.3)	52.3 (11.3)
Mean daily minimum °F (°C)	22.5 (−5.3)	26.3 (−3.2)	32.9 (0.5)	38.5 (3.6)	46.8 (8.2)	53.4 (11.9)	61.1 (16.2)	59.0 (15.0)	49.0 (9.4)	37.6 (3.1)	28.5 (−1.9)	22.5 (−5.3)	39.8 (4.4)
Mean minimum °F (°C)	2.7 (−16.3)	7.7 (−13.5)	20.1 (−6.6)	25.9 (−3.4)	30.7 (−0.7)	39.3 (4.1)	47.0 (8.3)	46.2 (7.9)	33.5 (0.8)	23.0 (−5.0)	15.1 (−9.4)	4.8 (−15.1)	−2.9 (−19.4)
Record low °F (°C)	−27 (−33)	−29 (−34)	0 (−18)	16 (−9)	22 (−6)	23 (−5)	34 (1)	32 (0)	16 (−9)	11 (−12)	−13 (−25)	−28 (−33)	−29 (−34)
Average precipitation inches (mm)	1.96 (50)	1.34 (34)	1.22 (31)	1.07 (27)	1.29 (33)	1.04 (26)	0.35 (8.9)	0.26 (6.6)	0.40 (10)	0.83 (21)	1.32 (34)	2.37 (60)	13.45 (341.5)
Average snowfall inches (cm)	6.9 (18)	2.4 (6.1)	0.4 (1.0)	trace	0.0 (0.0)	0.0 (0.0)	0.0 (0.0)	0.0 (0.0)	0.0 (0.0)	0.0 (0.0)	0.9 (2.3)	9.1 (23)	19.7 (50.4)
Average precipitation days (≥ 0.01 in)	11.0	9.4	10.2	9.6	7.6	6.8	2.6	2.5	2.7	5.1	10.6	12.1	90.2
Average snowy days (≥ 0.1 in)	4.5	2.0	0.5	0.0	0.0	0.0	0.0	0.0	0.0	0.0	0.9	4.5	12.4
Source 1: NOAA (snow/snow days 1981–2010)
Source 2: National Weather Service (mean maxima/minima 1981–2010)

== Economy ==
As of 2018 employment at the hospital and school system includes jobs which have university education as a prerequisite, but not many other jobs in Weiser have that requirement.

== Demographics ==
Historical population
Census	Pop.	Note	%±
1890	901		—
1900	1,364		51.4%
1910	2,600		90.6%
1920	3,154		21.3%
1930	2,724		−13.6%
1940	3,663		34.5%
1950	3,961		8.1%
1960	4,208		6.2%
1970	4,108		−2.4%
1980	4,771		16.1%
1990	4,571		−4.2%
2000	5,343		16.9%
2010	5,507		3.1%
2020	5,630		2.2%
2019 (est.)	5,376		−2.4%
U.S. Decennial Census

=== 2020 census ===
As of the 2020 census, Weiser had a population of 5,630. The median age was 42.4 years. 25.3% of residents were under the age of 18 and 23.3% were 65 years of age or older. For every 100 females, there were 92.8 males, and for every 100 females age 18 and over, there were 90.0 males.

97.0% of residents lived in urban areas, while 3.0% lived in rural areas.

There were 2,173 households in the city, of which 32.1% had children under the age of 18 living in them. Of all households, 46.2% were married-couple households, 18.3% were households with a male householder and no spouse or partner present, and 28.7% were households with a female householder and no spouse or partner present. About 27.1% of all households were made up of individuals, and 15.7% had someone living alone who was 65 years of age or older. There were 1,349 families residing in the city.

There were 2,329 housing units, of which 6.7% were vacant. The homeowner vacancy rate was 1.6% and the rental vacancy rate was 3.1%.

Note: the US Census treats Hispanic/Latino as an ethnic category. This table excludes Latinos from the racial categories and assigns them to a separate category. Hispanics/Latinos can be of any race.

Weiser racial composition (NH = Non-Hispanic)
Race	Number	Percentage
White (NH)	3,804	67.57%
Black or African American (NH)	9	0.16%
Native American or Alaska Native (NH)	47	0.83%
Asian (NH)	51	0.91%
Pacific Islander (NH)	3	0.05%
Some Other Race (NH)	26	0.46%
Mixed/Multi-Racial (NH)	269	4.78%
Hispanic or Latino	1,421	25.24%
Total	5,630	

=== 2010 census ===
As of the census of 2010, there were 5,507 people, 2,158 households, and 1,396 families residing in the city. The population density was 1,629.3 inhabitants per square mile (629.1/km^{2}). There were 2,355 housing units at an average density of 696.7 per square mile (269.0/km^{2}). The racial makeup of the city was 80.8% White, 0.3% African American, 0.9% Native American, 1.0% Asian, 14.3% from other races, and 2.7% from two or more races. Hispanic or Latino of any race were 26.1% of the population.

There were 2,158 households, of which 33.4% had children under the age of 18 living with them, 46.2% were married couples living together, 13.2% had a female householder with no husband present, 5.3% had a male householder with no wife present, and 35.3% were non-families. 30.2% of all households were made up of individuals, and 15.6% had someone living alone who was 65 years of age or older. The average household size was 2.50 and the average family size was 3.11.

The median age in the city was 38.7 years. 26.4% of residents were under the age of 18; 7.8% were between the ages of 18 and 24; 22.7% were from 25 to 44; 24.3% were from 45 to 64; and 18.7% were 65 years of age or older. The gender makeup of the city was 48.4% male and 51.6% female.

=== 2000 census ===
As of the census of 2000, there were 5,343 people, 2,018 households, and 1,368 families residing in the city. The population density was 2,280.5 inhabitants per square mile (880.5/km^{2}). There were 2,207 housing units at an average density of 942.0 per square mile (363.7/km^{2}). The racial makeup of the city was 81.13% White, 0.07% African American, 0.80% Native American, 1.20% Asian, 0.13% Pacific Islander, 13.92% from other races, and 2.73% from two or more races. Hispanic or Latino of any race were 22.91% of the population.

There were 2,018 households, out of which 33.4% had children under the age of 18 living with them, 52.4% were married couples living together, 11.2% had a female householder with no husband present, and 32.2% were non-families. 28.0% of all households were made up of individuals, and 17.0% had someone living alone who was 65 years of age or older. The average household size was 2.58 and the average family size was 3.19.

In the city, the age distribution of the population shows 28.3% under the age of 18, 9.2% from 18 to 24, 24.1% from 25 to 44, 19.9% from 45 to 64, and 18.5% who were 65 years of age or older. The median age was 36 years. For every 100 females, there were 90.8 males. For every 100 females age 18 and over, there were 86.6 males.

The median income for a household in the city was $26,880, and the median income for a family was $31,996. Males had a median income of $26,643 versus $16,386 for females. The per capita income for the city was $13,986. About 12.6% of families and 15.4% of the population were below the poverty line, including 17.9% of those under age 18 and 10.8% of those age 65 or over.

== Education ==
It is in the Weiser School District 431. The Weiser school district consists of Pioneer Elementary School, Kindergarten, 1st, 2nd, and 3rd grades, Park Intermediate School, 4th and 5th grade, Weiser Middle School, 6th, 7th, and 8th grade, and Weiser High School, 9th, 10th, 11th, and 12th grades.

The first school in Weiser was established in 1867, and the first school building was built in 1882. A dedicated building for the high school opened in 1904. During or after the 1890s Weiser Academy a.k.a. Intermountain Institute, a 750-acre (300 ha) boarding school, was established by a preacher named Edward Paddock. The National Youth Administration (NYA) took a part of the boarding school facility in the 1930s after Paddock experienced old age and ill health. In 1948 the whole boarding school property was given to the high school.

Washington County is in the area (but not the taxing region) of the College of Western Idaho, which has its main campus in Nampa.

== Notable people ==
- Helen Jeffreys Bakhtiar (1905–1973), American nurse
- Roger Batzel (1921–2000), nuclear scientist, director from 1971–1988 of Lawrence Livermore National Laboratory
- George Donart (1889–1961), Democratic nominee for U.S. Senator in 1946
- Walter Johnson, Hall of Fame Baseball player
- Bob Martyn, baseball player
- M. C. Richards, poet, potter, educator
- Harold L. Ryan – U.S. District Judge – District of Idaho (1981–1995)
- Kevin Sharp, country singer
- Jane Slocum, educator, lecturer
- Blaine Stubblefield, country singer, poet
- Herman Welker, U.S. Senator from Idaho (1951–57)
- Tim Wrightman, Super Bowl XX Champion as a member of the 1985 Chicago Bears
