= National Register of Historic Places listings in Adams County, Idaho =

Location of Adams County in Idaho

This is a list of the National Register of Historic Places listings in Adams County, Idaho.

This is intended to be a complete list of the properties and districts on the National Register of Historic Places in Adams County, Idaho, United States. Latitude and longitude coordinates are provided for many National Register properties and districts; these locations may be seen together in a map.

There are 8 properties and districts listed on the National Register in the county. More may be added; properties and districts nationwide are added to the Register weekly.

This National Park Service list is complete through NPS recent listings posted May 30, 2025.

== Current listings ==
| | Name on the Register | Image | Date listed | Location | City or town | Description |
|---|---|---|---|---|---|---|
| 1 | Adams County Courthouse | Adams County Courthouse | September 22, 1987 (#87001599) | Michigan St. 44°43′39″N 116°26′18″W | Council | |
| 2 | Council Ranger Station | Council Ranger Station | November 19, 1992 (#92000689) | Junction of U.S. Route 95 and Whiteley Ave. 44°43′50″N 116°25′56″W | Council | |
| 3 | Col. E. M. Heigho House | Col. E. M. Heigho House | May 22, 1978 (#78001041) | State Highway 55; 44°58′21″N 116°16′48″W | New Meadows | |
| 4 | Hells Canyon Archeological District | | August 10, 1984 (#84000984) | Address Restricted | Cuprum | Extends into Idaho and Nez Perce counties and Wallowa County, Oregon |
| 5 | A. O. Huntley Barn | | November 14, 1978 (#78001040) | West of Cuprum; 45°04′11″N 116°43′09″W | Cuprum | |
| 6 | Indian Mountain Fire Lookout | | August 11, 2022 (#100007977) | National Forest Road 243, 12 miles SE of Council, Idaho, Payette National Forest; 44°35′55″N 116°14′57″W | Council vicinity | |
| 7 | Meadows Schoolhouse | Meadows Schoolhouse | October 30, 1979 (#79000769) | State Highway 55; 44°57′40″N 116°14′44″W | New Meadows | |
| 8 | Pacific and Idaho Northern Railroad Depot | Pacific and Idaho Northern Railroad Depot | April 19, 1978 (#78001042) | U.S. Route 95; 44°58′14″N 116°17′16″W | New Meadows | |

== Former listings ==
| | Name on the Register | Image | Date listed | Date removed | Location | City or town | Description |
|---|---|---|---|---|---|---|---|
| 1 | Pomona Hotel | | May 22, 1978 (#78001039) | January 31, 1986 | Main and Moser Sts. | Council | Destroyed by fire in April, 1985 |

== See also ==
- List of National Historic Landmarks in Idaho
- National Register of Historic Places listings in Idaho
