= E. W. Van Hoesen =

American politician

- Died: January 15, 1923; Owyhee Hotel, Boise, Idaho

E. W. Van Hoesen (died January 15, 1923) was an American politician. He was a state senator in Idaho from Adams County, Idaho. He died suddenly in the lobby of the Owyhee Hotel, Boise, Idaho on January 15, 1923, and had been suffering from heart disease. He had arrived in Idaho six years earlier to manage an orchard in Mesa, Idaho.
