= Meadows Schoolhouse =

- U.S. National Register of Historic Places
- Location within Idaho Location within the United States
- Location: ID 55, New Meadows, Idaho
- Coordinates: 44°57′40″N 116°14′44″W
- Area: less than one acre
- Built: 1912
- Architectural style: Classical Eclectic
- NRHP reference No.: 79000769
- Added to NRHP: October 30, 1979

The Meadows Schoolhouse is a two-story schoolhouse building located in New Meadows, Idaho which was listed on the National Register of Historic Places in 1979. It has a tin roof, like many other buildings in the area do, for shedding snow.

It was deemed significant as a "fine example of classical eclectic schoolhouse architecture of the early twentieth century, handsomely executed in brick and very well-preserved. It is the most substantial surviving building in Meadows, a town which was left behind when the railroad passed by a few miles to the west."

== See also ==
- List of National Historic Landmarks in Idaho
- National Register of Historic Places listings in Adams County, Idaho
