= Adams County Courthouse =

Adams County Courthouse may refer to:

- Adams County Courthouse (Colorado), Brighton, Colorado, listed on the National Register of Historic Places (NRHP)
- Adams County Courthouse (Idaho), Council, Idaho, Council, Idaho, NRHP-listed
- Adams County Courthouse (Illinois), Quincy, Illinois
- Adams County Courthouse (Indiana), Decatur, Indiana, NRHP-listed
- Adams County Courthouse (Iowa), Corning, Iowa
- Adams County Courthouse, Natchez, Mississippi, a Mississippi Landmark and a contributing building in the Natchez On-Top-of-the-Hill Historic District
- Adams County Courthouse (North Dakota), Hettinger, North Dakota, NRHP-listed
- Adams County Courthouse (Ohio), West Union, Ohio, NRHP-listed
- Adams County Courthouse (Pennsylvania), Gettysburg, Pennsylvania, NRHP-listed
- Adams County Courthouse (Wisconsin), Friendship, Wisconsin, NRHP-listed
