= Bear, Idaho =

Unincorporated community in the state of Idaho, United States

- Unincorporated community
- Location within the state of Idaho Bear, Idaho (the United States)
- Coordinates: 45°01′28″N 116°40′20″W
- Country: United States
- State: Idaho
- County: Adams
- Elevation: 4,419 ft (1,347 m)
- Time zone: UTC-7 (Mountain (MST))
  - Summer (DST): UTC-6 (MDT)
- ZIP codes: 83612
- Area codes: 208, 986
- GNIS feature ID: 396085

Bear is an unincorporated community in Adams County in the U.S. state of Idaho. The community is located 23 mi (37 km) northwest of Council.

== History ==
Bear's population was 50 in 1909, and was just 5 in 1960.
