= Marymount Hermitage =

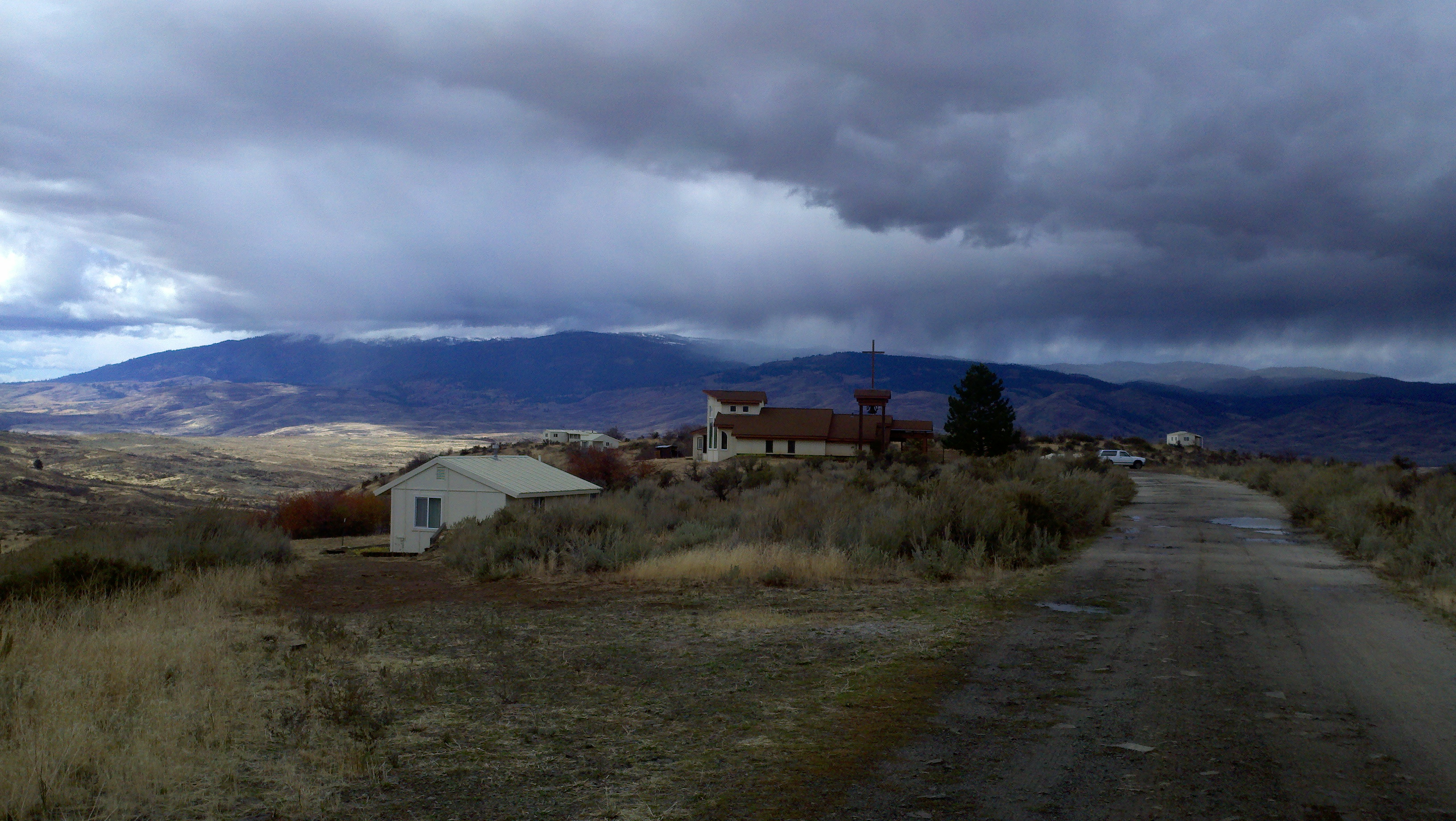
- Distance view of Marymount Hermitage
- Interactive map of the Marymount Hermitage area

General information
- Type: Hermitage
- Location: Mesa, Idaho, United States
- Coordinates: 44°38′35″N 116°27′50″W
- Construction started: 1984

Marymount Hermitage is a Roman Catholic hermitage for the Hermit Sisters of Mary in Mesa, Idaho, U.S.. Built on a mesa, it spans 100 acres of rangeland in Adams County.

== History ==
The Marymount Hermitage was dedicated by Bishop Sylvester William Treinen in 1984. It has ten buildings. Initially, there were six buildings: a chapel, a library, a common room and three hermitage buildings. In 1987, three more hermitage buildings and a bell tower were built. By 1994, a new chapel was built. In 2018, a library known as he Mercy House was built. The Hermitage's main resident is Sister Beverly Greger.

The hermitage welcomes guests on retreats.
