= Fruitvale, Idaho =

Unincorporated community in the state of Idaho, United States

- Unincorporated community
- Location within the state of Idaho Fruitvale, Idaho (the United States)
- Coordinates: 44°48′55″N 116°26′25″W
- Country: United States
- State: Idaho
- County: Adams
- Elevation: 3,081 ft (939 m)
- Time zone: UTC-7 (Mountain (MST))
  - Summer (DST): UTC-6 (MDT)
- ZIP codes: 83612
- Area codes: 208, 986
- GNIS feature ID: 396522

Fruitvale is an unincorporated community in Adams County in the U.S. state of Idaho. The community is located 5 mi (8.0 km) north of Council.

== History ==
Fruitvale's population was estimated at 100 in 1960.
