= Rock Flat Mine =

Mine in Idaho, United States

- Location within Idaho
- Location: New Meadows, Adams County, Idaho, United States; 44°56′44″N 116°12′05″W
- Products: Gold, Corundum

The Rock Flat Mine lies in the drainage of the Rock Flat Placer through the Little Goose Creek Canyon. It is a small placer mine in central Idaho. it primarily produces gold, corundum, spinel, and topaz.

== See also ==
- Little Goose Creek Canyon
- Rock Flat Placer
