= Patty Boydstun =

American alpine skier (born 1951)

Personal information
- Born: December 22, 1951 (age 74) Council, Idaho, U.S.
- Height: 5 ft 0 in (1.52 m)

Skiing career
- Sport: Alpine skiing
- Retired: March 1974 (age 22)
- Disciplines: Slalom
- World Cup debut: April 1968 (age 16)

Olympics
- Teams: 1 – (1972)
- Medals: 0

World Championships
- Teams: 1 – (1972), includes Olympics
- Medals: 0

World Cup
- Seasons: 5 – (1970–74)
- Podiums: 0 (10 top tens)
- Overall titles: 0 – (24th in 1972)
- Discipline titles: 0 – (14th in SL, 1972)
Medal record
Women's alpine skiing
Representing the United States
U.S. Alpine Championships
Gold medal – first place	1970 Glen Ellen	Slalom

Patricia "Patty" Boydstun (-Hovdey) (born December 22, 1951) is a former World Cup alpine ski racer from the United States.

Born in Council, Idaho, she competed on the World Cup circuit in the early 1970s, and finished eighth in the slalom at the 1972 Winter Olympics. She had ten top ten finishes in World Cup slaloms; the first came at age 16 in April 1968 at Heavenly Valley, California.

In March 1970, Boydstun won the U.S. national title in slalom in Vermont at Glen Ellen, which was later annexed by adjacent Sugarbush.

Raised in McCall, Boydstun learned to ski and race at the Little Ski Hill and Brundage Mountain, where her father Johnny was its first employee and mountain manager for 27 years.

She married Dean Hovdey in the 1970s and they founded a sporting goods store in McCall in 1979 which they continue to own and operate.

== World Cup results ==
=== Season standings ===
Season	Age	Overall	Slalom	Giant Slalom	Downhill
1968	16	55	42	—	—
1970	18	30	21	—	—
1971	19	26	18	—	—
1972	20	24	14	—	—
1973	21	—	—	—	—
1974	22	—	—	—	—

Points were only awarded for top ten finishes (see scoring system).

=== Race top tens ===
- 10 top tens - (all in slalom)

Season	Date	Location	Discipline	Place
1968	6 Apr 1968	(United States) Heavenly Valley, USA	Slalom	10th
1970	3 Jan 1970	Oberstaufen, West Germany	Slalom	7th
1970	2 Feb 1970	Abetone, Italy	Slalom	9th
1971	16 Dec 1970	Val-d'Isère, France	Slalom	8th
1971	9 Jan 1971	Oberstaufen, West Germany	Slalom	5th
1971	14 Jan 1971	Grindelwald, Switzerland	Slalom	10th
1971	24 Feb 1971	(United States) Heavenly Valley, USA	Slalom	10th
1972	13 Jan 1972	Bad Gastein, Austria	Slalom	7th
1972	19 Jan 1972	Grindelwald, Switzerland	Slalom	9th
1972	3 Mar 1972	(United States) Heavenly Valley, USA	Slalom	5th

== Olympic results ==
Year	Age	Slalom	Giant Slalom	Super-G	Downhill	Combined
1972	20	8	—	not run	—	not run

- From 1948 through 1980, the Winter Olympics were also the World Championships for alpine skiing.
