= A. O. Huntley Barn =

Historic barn in Adams County, Idaho, US

- U.S. National Register of Historic Places
- Location within Idaho
- Nearest city: Cuprum, Idaho
- Coordinates: 45°04′11″N 116°43′09″W
- Area: less than one acre
- Built: 1902
- NRHP reference No.: 78001040
- Added to NRHP: November 14, 1978

The A. O. Huntley Barn, in Adams County, Idaho, near Cuprum, Idaho, was built in 1902. It was listed on the National Register of Historic Places in 1978.

It is a three-story barn with board and batten siding and a steep gambrel roof. The building is more than 100 feet (30 m) long and 40 feet (12 m) wide. It has a braced frame construction and rests upon a raised concrete foundation.

The basement floor level has a concrete floor covered with soil, and is where cattle were housed. The first floor is supported by 1 by 12 inches (2.5 cm × 30.5 cm) beams. The roof is supported by 11 braced beams.

The west side of the barn has a shed-roofed lean-to. A wing that originally extended from the north side has collapsed and been removed.

Its National Register nomination assesses it as:

architecturally significant as one of the largest barns of its period in Idaho. It is one of the few remaining three-story barns in the state. Locally it is the largest structure in the Cuprum area. It stands in spacious meadows, surrounded by forest, at the intersection of the road which leads to Cuprum and the Kleinschmidt grade. Set at this major intersection, and being the largest building within a forty mile-radius, it is the major architectural landmark in the Cuprum area.
