= Council Ranger Station =

- U.S. National Register of Historic Places
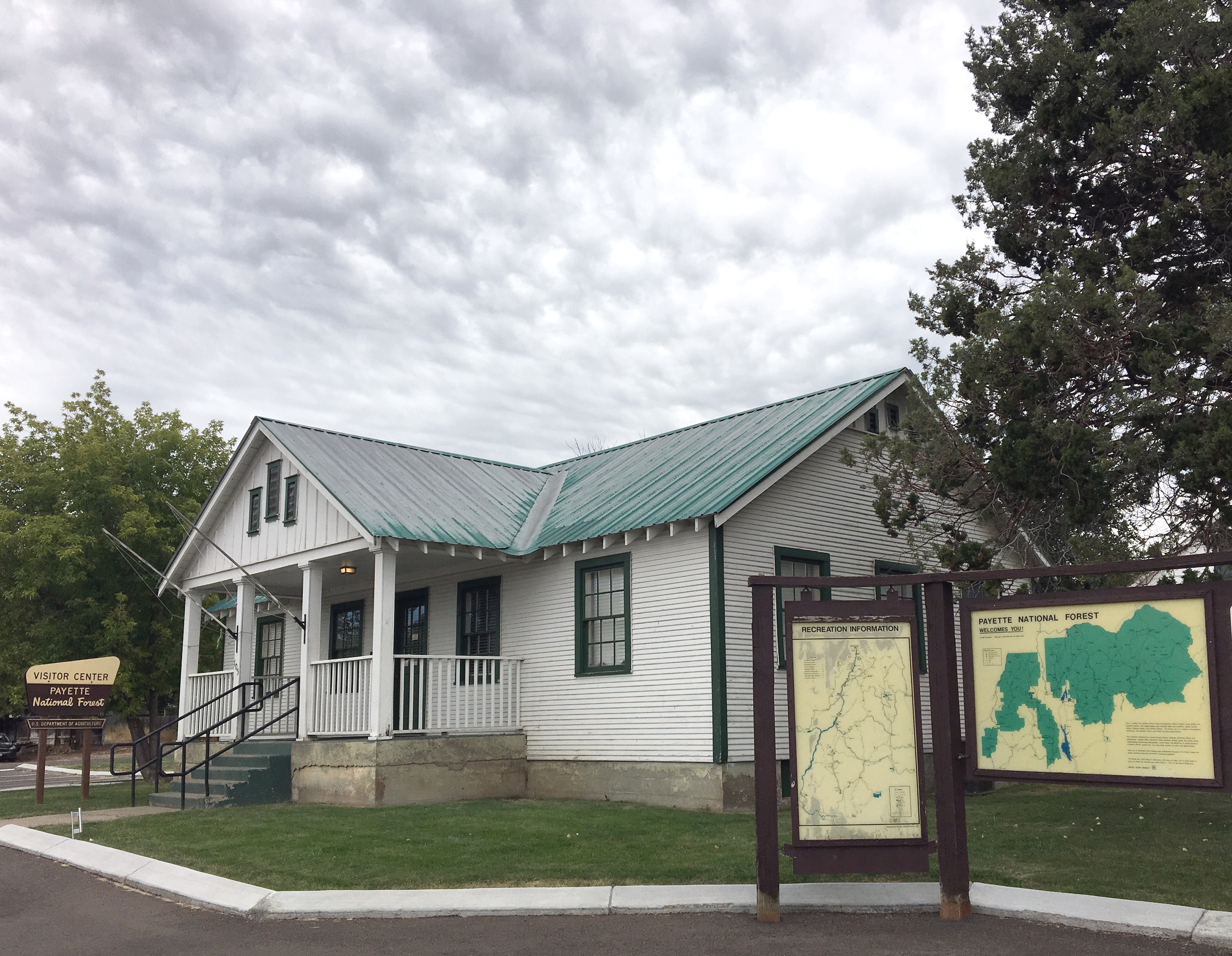

- Location within Idaho Location within the United States
- Location: Jct. of US 95 and Whiteley Ave., Council, Idaho
- Coordinates: 44°43′50″N 116°25′52″W
- Area: 1.8 acres (0.73 ha)
- Built: 1933
- Built by: Civilian Conservation Corps
- Architect: U.S. Forest Service
- NRHP reference No.: 92000689
- Added to NRHP: November 19, 1992

The Council Ranger Station located in Council, Idaho, listed on the National Register of Historic Places.

It is a complex of five frame buildings, and associated landscaping.

== See also ==
- List of National Historic Landmarks in Idaho
- National Register of Historic Places listings in Adams County, Idaho
