= Little Salmon River =

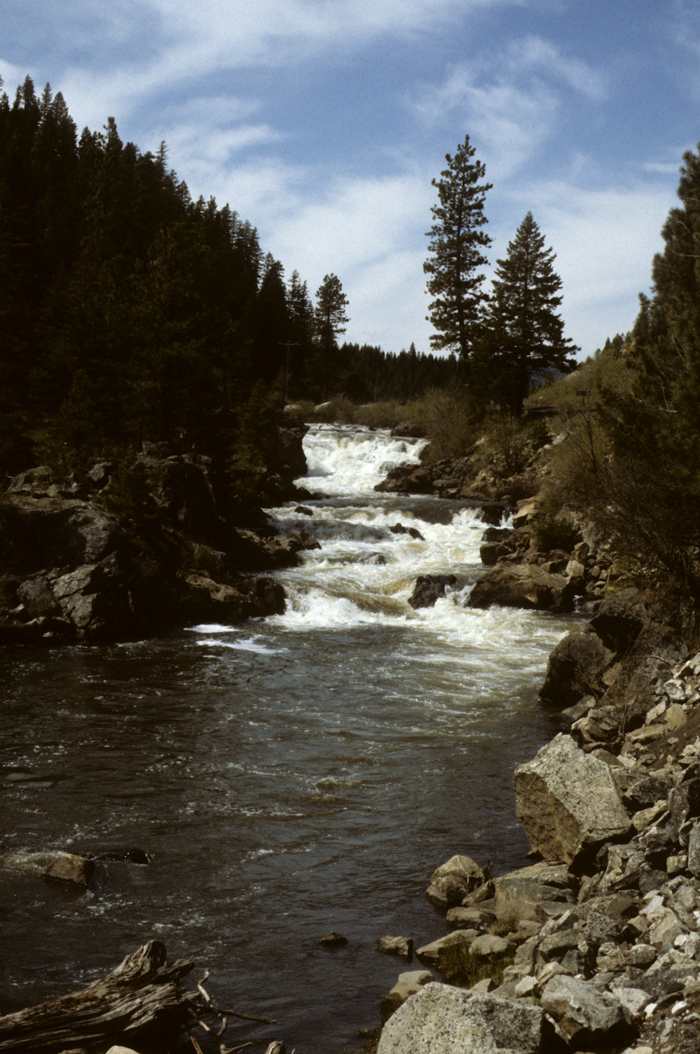
- A waterfall on the Little Salmon River

- Location of the mouth in the United States Location of the mouth in Idaho

Location
- Country: United States
- State: Idaho
- Region: Idaho and Adams counties
- City: New Meadows

Physical characteristics
- Source: Blue Bunch Ridge
  - location: Sawtooth Range, Adams County, Idaho
  - coordinates: 44°50′28″N 116°15′46″W
  - elevation: 6,280 ft (1,910 m)
- Mouth: Salmon River
  - location: Riggins, Idaho County
  - coordinates: 45°25′00″N 116°18′53″W
  - elevation: 1,716 ft (523 m)
- Length: 51 mi (82 km), South-North
- Basin size: 576 sq mi (1,490 km^{2})
- Discharge
  - average: 731 cu ft/s (20.7 m^{3}/s)
  - maximum: 12,600 cu ft/s (360 m^{3}/s)

Basin features
- River system: Salmon River
- Tributaries
  - left: Rapid River
  - right: Goose Creek

The Little Salmon River is a tributary of the Salmon River in Idaho in the western United States. The river is approximately 51 miles (82 km) in length and drains 576 square miles (1,490 km^{2}) of land. It flows generally northward from its headwaters in the Sawtooth Range through the Meadows Valley before cutting through a deep canyon to meet the Salmon River at Riggins.

== Course ==
The Little Salmon River rises at an elevation of 6,280 feet (1,915 m) above sea level on Blue Bunch Ridge in the Sawtooth Range of south-central Idaho, near Payette Lake. From there, it flows north through the broad Meadows Valley past Meadows and New Meadows, where it receives Goose Creek from the right and Mud Creek from the left.

The river then enters a canyon, cutting across the western edge of the Salmon River Mountains, forming the boundary between Idaho and Adams counties. Most of the Little Salmon runs parallel to U.S. Route 95, with the highway crossing it several times. It receives Hazard Creek and Payette Creek both from the right, then receives Boulder Creek, the Rapid River, and Squaw Creek from the left, and past Pollock, then joins the Salmon River at the south end of Riggins, at 1,720 feet (525 m) above sea level.

The Little Salmon begins in a developed and relatively flat agricultural valley before descending into a wild mountain canyon further downstream, a course that bears some resemblance to the Klamath River, which also originates in an agricultural valley before cutting through mountains to the sea.

=== Discharge ===
A U.S. Geological Survey stream gauge at the mouth recorded an average flow of 731.1 cubic feet per second (20.7 m^{3}/s) from 1952 to present. The highest flow ever recorded was 12,600 cu ft/s (360 m^{3}/s) on June 17, 1974, during a period of severe flooding across the region.

== Geology and land use ==
The Little Salmon River formed as a result of a rift valley developing between the Rocky Mountains and the Columbia Plateau section of the Intermontane Plateaus. Columbia River basalts underlie much of the western and central parts of the watershed, while other types of volcanic rock of closer origin form the foundations of the eastern mountains. The entire watershed is dissected by fault-block rifting. The water table is high, and soils are generally well drained and of volcanic origin.

The upper section of the watershed is a broad and low-gradient, sediment-floored valley used primarily for agriculture and ranching activities, and contains most of the basin's population. The rest of the river flows in a wild, deep, and narrow canyon, largely undeveloped with the exception of U.S. Highway 95. Logging has also been a historical activity in the valley.

== History ==
=== Indigenous peoples ===
The Little Salmon River Basin lay at the heart of the Nez Perce people's homeland for centuries before European American arrival. Scholars have estimated the tribe's aboriginal territory to have been as large as 27,000 square miles. The Nez Perce, Shoshone, and Bannock tribes all inhabited the watershed and depended on the river for salmon and on the surrounding lands for hunting and gathering. The Nez Perce undertook seasonal migrations on horseback, moving from river valleys in spring to higher lands by late summer, and sometimes wintered with fellow tribes in what is now Montana.

Europeans introduced horses to the Bannock, who in turn spread their use to the Shoshones, allowing them to travel further and hunt buffalo and other big game. The Nez Perce's renowned horsemanship permitted annual travel to the Great Plains for buffalo hunting over major trails such as Lolo Pass.

=== Gold rush and early settlement ===
When prospectors struck gold in the summer of 1861 on lands in the broader Salmon River country, the Little Salmon corridor became a key route for miners and settlers moving between northern and southern Idaho. The discovery prompted a large influx of prospectors into central Idaho, and by the following spring thousands had arrived in the region. Prospecting on Nez Perce land had been prohibited by the 1855 treaty recognizing the tribe's historic occupation, but the influx of miners proved impossible to stop. The United States subsequently negotiated a new treaty in 1863 that ceded approximately 90% of the tribe's original treaty lands to the federal government.

Settlers began arriving in the Meadows Valley in the 1850s and established farms, ranches, and towns. For decades, communications with the outside world remained limited. Petitions for a military road along the Little Salmon and Salmon rivers were submitted to the Idaho congressional delegate in the 1870s, driven in part by the tensions of the Nez Perce War of 1877, which was fought across this region.

=== Transportation development ===
The Pacific and Idaho Northern Railroad reached the Meadows area in 1911, terminating its line approximately two miles west of Meadows at a new townsite it called New Meadows. Over time, commercial activity in Meadows shifted to New Meadows. Plans to extend the railroad north through the Little Salmon Canyon were surveyed as early as 1899, but the engineering challenges of the sheer canyon walls made construction prohibitively expensive — estimated at over $100,000 per mile — and the project was ultimately abandoned by 1920 as automobile ownership grew rapidly in Idaho.

U.S. Route 95 now follows the river through much of its length and was described by early motorists as among the most scenic drives in the state. One early traveler described the canyon as a place where "you look up at the frowning cliffs, you look beside you at the lovely roses and syringas in full bloom... you look down at the river, rushing and foaming and beating against the rocks in its bed."

=== National forests ===
The Payette National Forest and Nez Perce National Forest cover portions of the Little Salmon River watershed, but the river itself does not flow over federally protected lands at any point. The river is completely free-flowing and unobstructed by dams or dikes.

== Hydrology ==
Irrigation is the primary water use in the Little Salmon River watershed. Although irrigated farmland lies all along the river, most of it is concentrated in the Meadows Valley and in the watershed of Round Valley Creek, a major western tributary. There are 18,500 acres (75 km^{2}) of irrigated farmland in the Meadows Valley and Round Valley Creek area, and 700 acres (2.8 km^{2}) closer to the mouth. Although no dams have been built on the river itself, there are three dams in the headwaters of Goose Creek, a major tributary, to regulate flows for irrigation. Total annual water usage for irrigation is 74,800 acre-feet (92,300,000 m^{3}).

Most of the watershed receives about 20 to 25 inches (510 to 640 mm) of rainfall per year. On higher mountain slopes rainfall can reach 40 to 50 inches (100 to 130 cm) annually, and precipitation on the highest west-facing mountains can be considerably higher.

== Wildlife and fisheries ==
=== Fish species ===
The Little Salmon River is habitat for several fish species, including steelhead, spring-summer Chinook salmon, and rainbow trout. Steelhead and spring-summer Chinook are listed as threatened under the federal Endangered Species Act. Other species present in the river include Pacific lamprey, several species of trout and dace.

=== Anadromous fish barrier ===
Anadromous fish can only access approximately half of the river's length. At river mile 24.7 (river kilometer 39.8), Little Salmon Falls — located at the confluence with Round Valley Creek — marks the upstream limit for anadromous fish migration. However, this barrier may not always have been present in its current form; Native Americans have historically fished for salmon on the Little Salmon well upstream of the falls, suggesting that access may have been different at some point in the past.

=== Declining populations ===
Idaho's salmon and steelhead populations have declined substantially from their historical numbers due to multiple factors including hydropower development, loss of freshwater habitat, overfishing, poor ocean conditions, and hatchery practices. The construction of four dams on the lower Snake River in the 1960s and 1970s is among the factors cited in the declines. NOAA Fisheries listed Snake River Basin steelhead as threatened under the Endangered Species Act in 1997, a status that was reaffirmed in subsequent five-year reviews. The Idaho Department of Fish and Game tracks steelhead returns to the Little Salmon River annually as a distinct monitoring population alongside the upper Salmon and Snake rivers.

=== Riparian vegetation ===
Cottonwood, willow, dogwood, and alder grow along the banks of the river.

== See also ==
- List of rivers of Idaho
- List of longest streams of Idaho
- List of tributaries of the Columbia River
- Salmon River (Idaho)
- Nez Perce people
