= Col. E. M. Heigho House =

- U.S. National Register of Historic Places
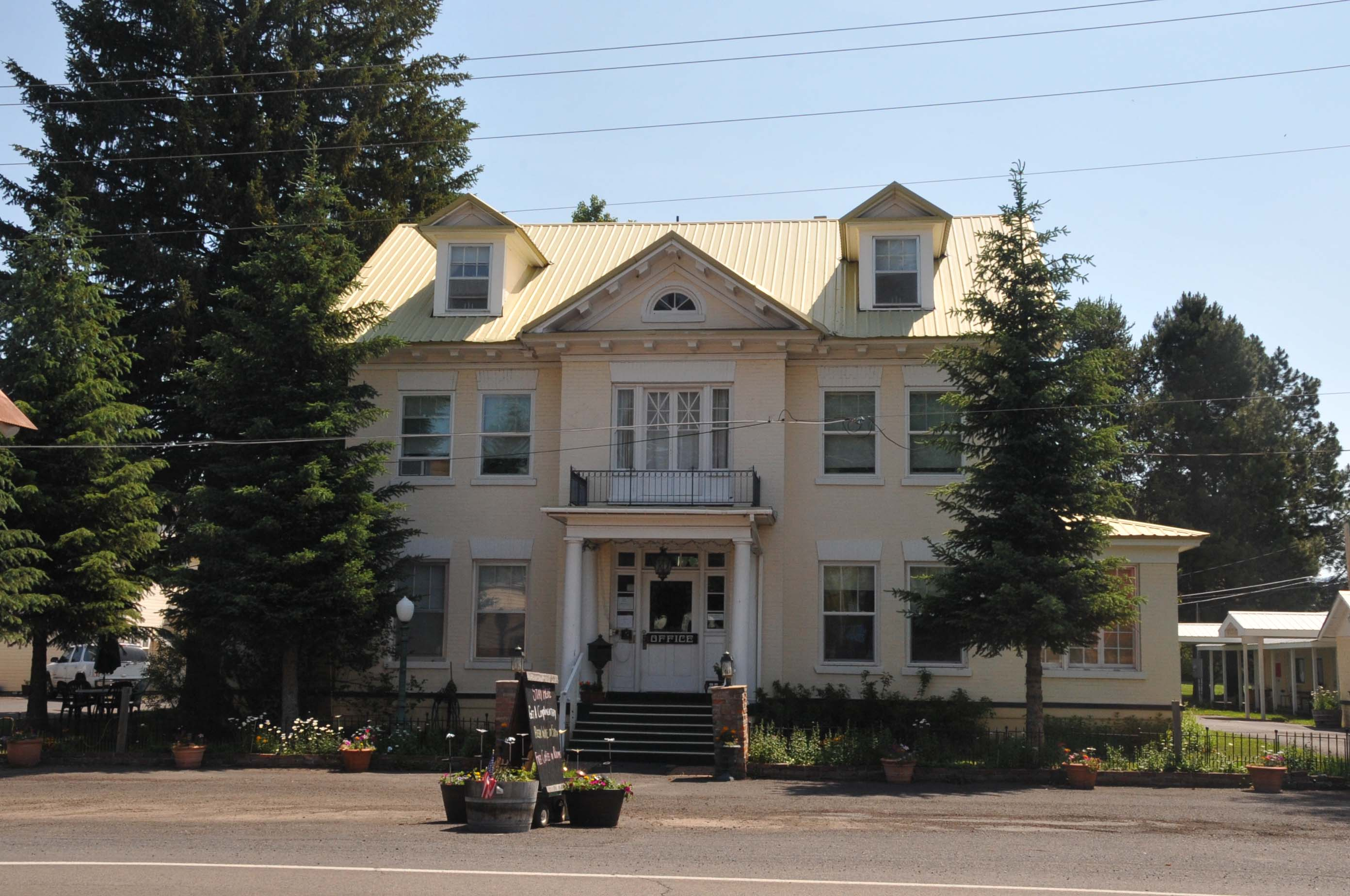
- Location: ID 55, New Meadows, Idaho
- Coordinates: 44°58′21″N 116°16′48″W
- Area: less than one acre
- Built: 1911
- Built by: George Brinson
- Architect: H.W. Bond
- Architectural style: Georgian Revival
- NRHP reference No.: 78001041
- Added to NRHP: May 22, 1978

The Col. E. M. Heigho House, on Idaho State Highway 55 in New Meadows, Idaho, was built in 1911. It was listed on the National Register of Historic Places in 1978.

It is a two-and-one-haIf-story brick house built in Georgian Revival style. As of 1977, the brick was painted red. It has an outset center bay, with a one-story portico of Doric columns, with a fanlight in its gable; the portico's roof-balcony has an iron balustrade.

It was designed by Weiser architect H. W. Bond, and was built by contractor George Brinson.

It has also been known as the Farnsworth Hotel.
