= Gilbert F. Smith =

Idaho politician

Gilbert F. Smith (March 18, 1846 - ?) was a potter, cattleman, and banker who served as a state legislator in Idaho. He was elected to the legislature in 1894 and then the Idaho Senate. He represented Washington County, Idaho.

He was born in Ohio to Henry, a native of Ireland, and Mary née Gilbert Smith. He had nine siblings. He served during the American Civil War. He became a potter before moving to Idaho. He raised cattle and owned property. He sold his cattle ranching business and removed to Meadows Valley, Idaho where he was president of Meadows Valley Bank.

He was foreman at F. M. Stout & Company for two years before heading west.
