= Brundage Mountain =

Ski area in Idaho, United States

- Location in Idaho Brundage Mountain (the United States)
- Location: Payette National Forest; Adams & Valley counties, Idaho, U.S.
- Nearest city: McCall - 8 mi (13 km); Boise - 115 mi (185 km); Lewiston - 160 mi (255 km)
- Coordinates: 45.005°N 116.155°W
- Vertical: 1,800 ft (550 m)
- Top elevation: 7,640 ft (2,330 m)
- Base elevation: 5,840 ft (1,780 m); Centennial; 6,000 ft (1,830 m) main base area
- Skiable area: 1,500 acres (610 ha)
- Trails: 46: 20% easiest; 50% more difficult; 30% most difficult
- Longest run: Temptation; 2.0 mi (3.2 km)
- Lift system: 5 chairlifts: 2 hi-speed quad; 3 fixed-grip triples
- Lift capacity: 7,900 / hour
- Terrain parks: 2
- Snowfall: 300–350 in (760–890 cm)
- Snowmaking: none
- Night skiing: none
- Website: Brundage.com

Brundage Mountain Resort is an alpine ski area in the western United States, located in west central Idaho in the Payette National Forest. Brundage first opened in November 1961 and is eight miles (13 km) northwest of McCall, a twenty-minute drive in average winter conditions.

The summit elevation of Brundage is 7,803 feet (2,380 m) above sea level, with an overall vertical drop of 1,921 feet (590 m). Five chairlifts and one surface lift serve the 1,920 acres (7.8 km^{2}) of primarily west-facing terrain, overlooking New Meadows, Adams County, and past the Snake River into eastern Oregon. The area's annual snowfall is 300–350 inches (760–890 cm). The summit of Brundage Mountain straddles the county line with Valley County to the east, in which McCall lies.

Brundage also offers backcountry powder skiing on 18,000 acres (7,284 ha) of terrain north of the lift-served ski area, serviced by snow cats. Full-day guided trips are available to areas including Granite Mountain at 8,478 ft (2,584 m) and Slab Mountain at 8,225 feet (2,507 m). These areas are among the highest average snowfalls in the state.

Brundage is accessed from State Highway 55 via the turnoff to Goose Lake Road, four miles (6 km) west of central McCall. Goose Lake Road climbs slightly over 1000 vertical feet (300 m) in four miles (6 km) when it diverts to the ski area's parking lot, at an elevation of just over 6,000 feet (1,830 m). The ski area is bisected by the 45th parallel, midway between the equator and North Pole.

During the summer months, Brundage has chairlift-served mountain biking on over thirty miles (48 km) of specially built single-track trails.

== History ==
In the late 1950s, alpine skiers in the McCall area had just the Little Ski Hill, with its modest 405-foot (123 m) vertical drop. Bogus Basin near Boise was over three hours away (in good conditions) by vehicle, and Sun Valley was considerably farther. One of these McCall skiers was Boise agribusiness tycoon J.R. Simplot (1909–2008), who had a vacation home on Payette Lake.

Financed by Simplot, the Brundage Mountain project took shape under the guidance of longtime McCall resident, Warren Brown (1912–2000) and ski legend Corey Engen (1916–2006). A former Olympian and instructor at the Little Ski Hill, Engen laid out the trails on the mountain during the summer of 1961. Favorable snowfall allowed Brundage to open on Thanksgiving on November 23, with a double chairlift, T-bar, and a rope tow. The lift tickets were priced at a then-lofty five dollars, similar to Sun Valley's rates; Engen stayed on as resort manager until 1970. The original A-frame lodge was expanded with a two-story addition in the fall of 1971, and lift tickets went up fifty cents, to $5.50.

A second double chairlift, Brundage Creek, was added in 1976, in parallel with the original Pioneer. The Centennial triple chairlift was added in 1990 to the southern edge of the terrain, which increased the area's terrain by 30% and added 200 feet (60 m) of vertical drop by lowering the base. The Easy Street chairlift was installed at the beginner area in 1994, adding a lower parking lot at its base. The parallel double chairlifts were replaced 29 years ago in the summer of 1997 by a single high-speed detachable quad, the Blue Bird Express, which ascended to the summit in a rapid seven minutes.

In April 2006, the J.R. Simplot Company sold its 50% interest in Brundage Mountain to the ski area's long-time co-owner, the DeBoer family. (Diane (Brown) DeBoer is the daughter of co-founder Warren Brown.) That August, a long-anticipated land trade with U.S. Forest Service was completed. It gave Brundage Mountain the ownership of 388 acres (1.57 km^{2}) around its base area, allowing the opportunity for future resort development. In return, the USFS gained important private in-holdings in the Payette National Forest.

In 2007, Brundage invested more than $3 million to install two new fixed-grip triple chairlifts, Lakeview and The Bear. The Lakeview lift opened up 160 acres (0.6 km^{2}) of south-facing terrain, with sweeping views of Payette Lake, McCall, and Valley County. The Bear connects the Centennial base area to a ridge above the main base area. A platter lift which served the expert Race Course and easier runs was removed. A small lodge, The Bear Den, was added at the top of the lift. Excluding the Easy Street chair, total uphill capacity for the area was increased from 3,100 to 6,700 riders per hour. In 2024, a new detachable Doppelmayr quad chairlift replaced Centennial Triple Chair, a 32-year-old fixed grip triple chair that was installed in 1990, the year Idaho celebrated 100 years of statehood. It took eight months for the old chairlift to be dismantled and replaced by the new state-of-the-art lift named Centennial Express. In 2024, the new 18,000 sq. ft. Mountain Adventure Center opened providing a new home for ticket sales, guest services, rentals, retail, tune shop, and MTN Sports School. Future plans include a new Food & Beverage lodge.

In 2022, development began on the Northwoods neighborhood, Brundage's first ski in/ski out neighborhood. Northwoods consists of 32 lots on Lower Rodeo run. In 2025, ground broke on Norhaven, Brundage's second slopeside community. Norhaven has 39 planned units, which are expected to be constructed over the course of several years. The design calls for a mix of single-family Villas, Twin Gable duplexes, and multi-story Lofts built using natural materials in a mountain modern style. One-, two- and three-bedroom options will be available.

== Future ==
Since 2021, Brundage Mountain Has Invested $35 Million in proceeds from residential development projects directly into ski area improvements. Recent and ongoing investments include the new Mountain Adventure Center (MAC), which opened in winter 2024-25 as a modern base area hub for rentals, retail, and guest services, and the high-speed Centennial Express chairlift, which opened in winter 2023-24, offering better access to the mountain’s south side.

The ownership group that acquired Brundage Mountain in 2020 has also invested in a 2,800 square foot Ski Patrol/Admin Building, purchased and restored an historic schoolhouse in New Meadows for employee housing, created and equipped an independent Fire protection agency and EMS transport agency, and launched the Brundage Mountain Community Fund, among other projects.

Additional phases of the resort’s 10-Year Improvement Plan include new lodging, dining, and expanded terrain options, all designed to enhance access and maintain Brundage’s reputation for uncrowded powder and laid-back charm.

Future expansion plans at Brundage Mountain include a chairlift to the north, serving the 7,803-foot (2,378 m) summit of Sargent's Mountain (formerly known as "Brundage Mountain"). The new chair will open new expert terrain and reach 163 feet (50 m) higher than the present summit, the top of the Blue Bird Express quad.

== Lift statistics ==
| Chairlift | Type | Vertical rise | Time | Hourly capacity | Installed | Replaced |
|---|---|---|---|---|---|---|
| Blue Bird; Express | hi-speed quad | 1,556 ft (474 m) | 7 min | 1,800 | 1997 | two doubles (1961, 1976) |
| Centennial Express | hi-speed quad | 1,638 ft (499 m) | 6 min | 1,900 | 2023 | new lines |
| Lakeview | triple | 816 ft (249 m) | 8 min | 1,800 | 2007 | new lines |
| The Bear | triple | 622 ft (190 m) | 6 min | 1,800 | 2007 | new lines |
| Easy Street | triple | 90 ft (27 m) | 3 min | 1,200 | 1994 | new lines |
| Easy Rider Conveyor Belt | Surface Lift |

== U.S. Ski Team ==
- Patty Boydstun-Hovdey - World Cup and Olympic alpine racer
  - 1970 U.S. slalom champion - 8th in slalom at 1972 Winter Olympics
