= Harriet Miller (politician) =

American chemist and politician from California

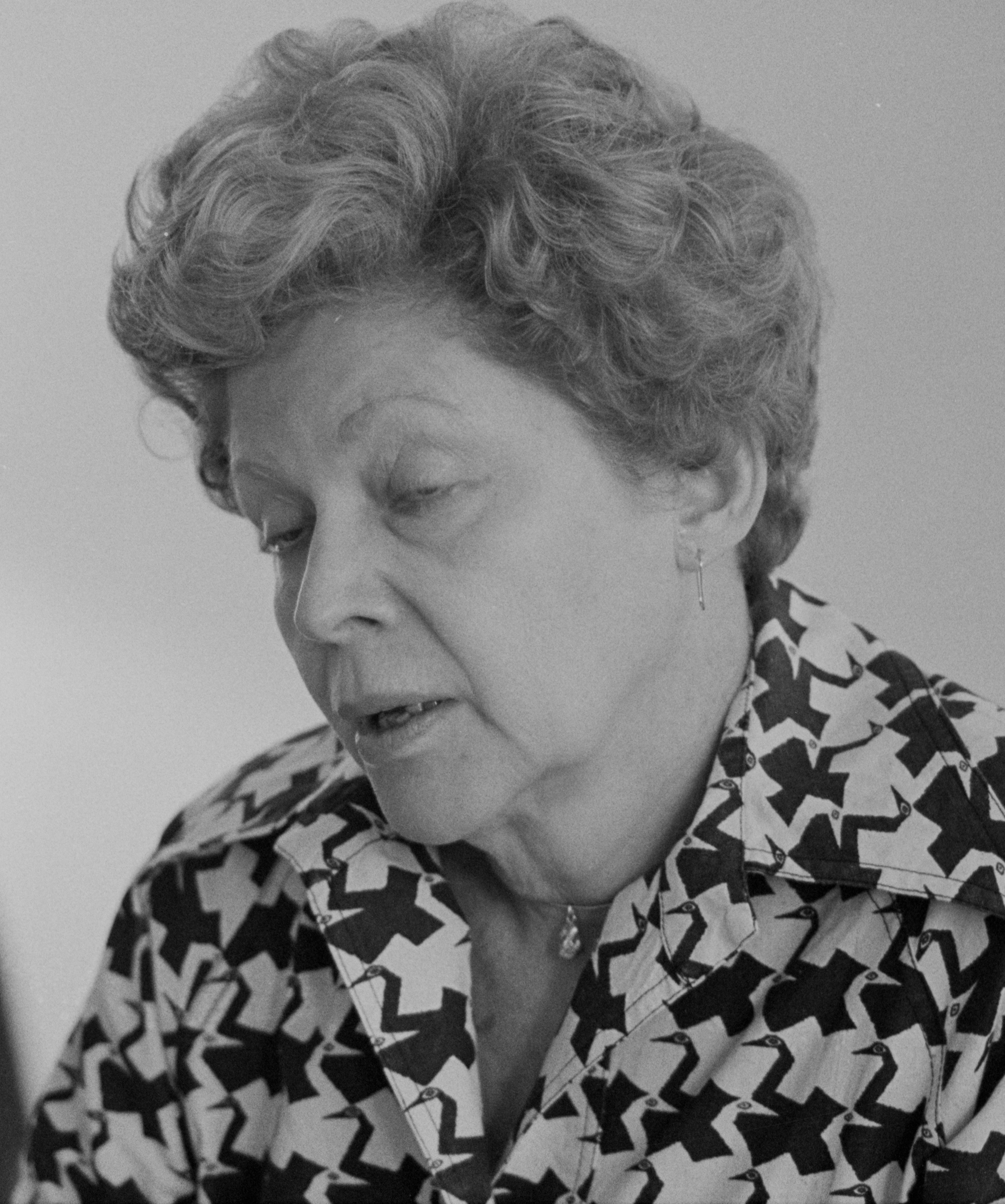
- Miller in 1977

Mayor of Santa Barbara, California
- In office 1995–2001
- Preceded by: Hal Conklin
- Succeeded by: Marty Blum

10th Montana Superintendent of Public Instruction
- In office January 7, 1957 – January 6, 1969
- Preceded by: Mary Condon
- Succeeded by: Dolores Colburg

Personal details
- Born: July 4, 1919 Council, Idaho
- Died: January 6, 2010 (aged 90) Santa Barbara, California
- Education: Whitman College, University of Pennsylvania
- Occupation: Chemist, politician

Harriet Miller (July 4, 1919 – January 6, 2010) was an American chemist and politician. Miller was the mayor of Santa Barbara, California.

== Early life ==
On July 4, 1919, Miller was born in Council, Idaho. Miller's father was a teacher and high school principal and her mother was a school teacher.

== Education ==
Miller earned a Bachelor's degree in chemistry from Whitman College in Walla Walla, Washington. Miller earned a master's degree in chemistry from the University of Pennsylvania.

== Career ==
In 1944, Miller became a chemist at Atlantic Richfield (now ARCO) in Philadelphia, Pennsylvania until 1950. She was elected Superintendent of the Montana Office of Public Instruction in 1957.

After running her own management consulting firm from 1969 to 1975, she was hired as the associate director of AARP. She would become director in 1976, but was fired from this position by the board after 1977.

== Mayor of Santa Barbara ==
In 1981, Miller moved to Santa Barbara, California. In 1987, Miller was appointed as a member of the city council in Santa Barbara, California.

In 1995, Miller became the mayor of Santa Barbara until 2001, where she would be succeeded by Marty Blum.

== Personal life ==
On January 6, 2010, Miller died at her home in Santa Barbara, California. She was 90 years old.

== See also ==
- List of mayors of Santa Barbara, California
