= New Meadows station =

- Pacific and Idaho Northern Railroad Depot
- U.S. National Register of Historic Places
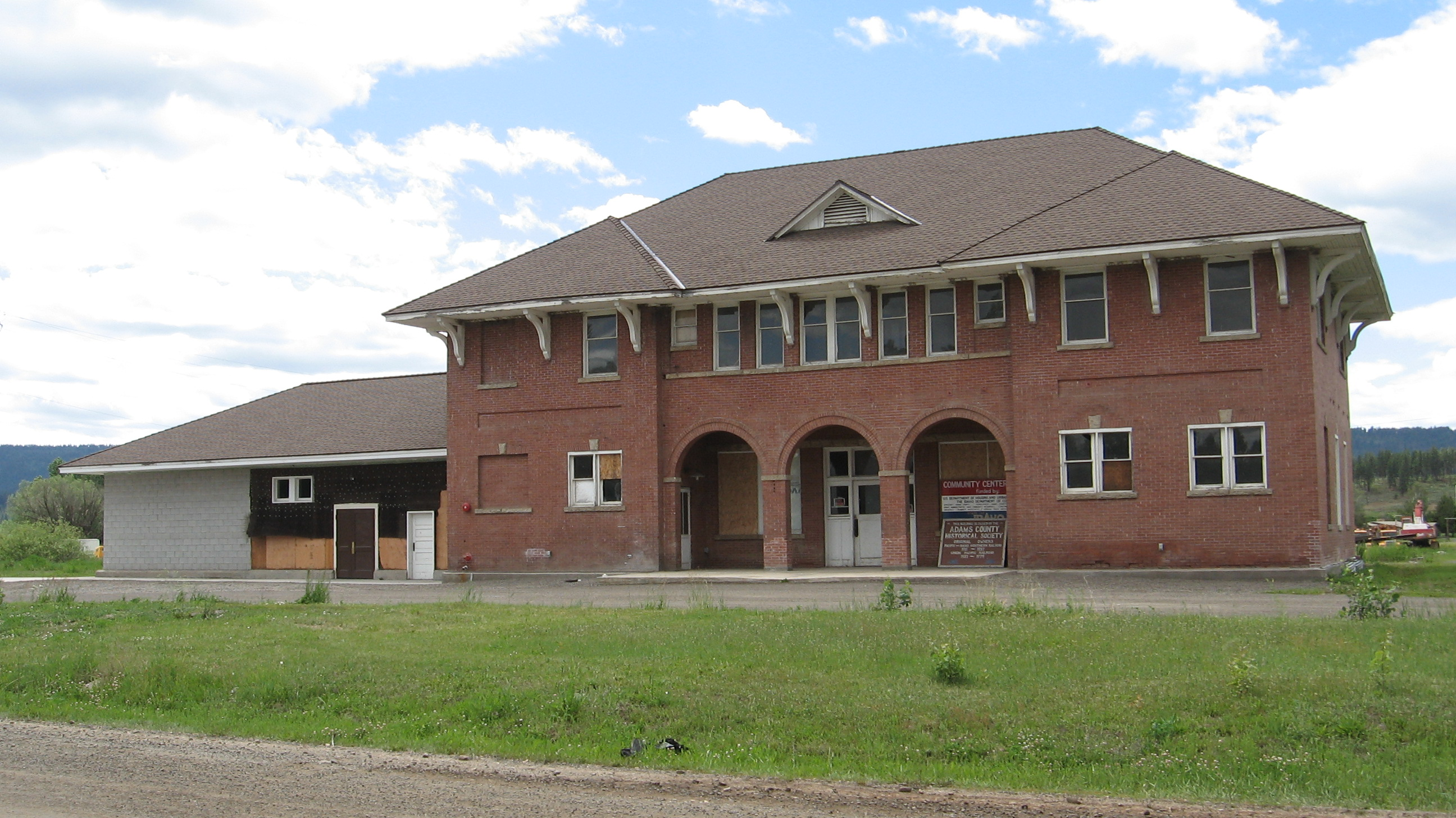
- Looking west in June 2007

- Location within Idaho Location within the United States
- Location: New Meadows, Idaho, U.S.
- Coordinates: 44.9705°N 116.2878°W
- Area: less than one acre
- Built: 1911; 115 years ago
- Architect: Bond, H.W.
- Architectural style: Italianate
- NRHP reference No.: 78001042
- Added to NRHP: April 19, 1978

The Pacific and Idaho Northern Railroad Depot is a building in the western United States, at New Meadows, Idaho, and is listed on the National Register of Historic Places.

Located on the west side of town, it is just south of Virginia Street (U.S. 95) on the west side of South Commercial Avenue. Built 115 years ago in 1911, its approximate elevation is 3,870 feet (1,180 m) above sea level.

== See also ==
- List of National Historic Landmarks in Idaho
- National Register of Historic Places listings in Adams County, Idaho
