= Adams County Courthouse (Idaho) =

- U.S. National Register of Historic Places
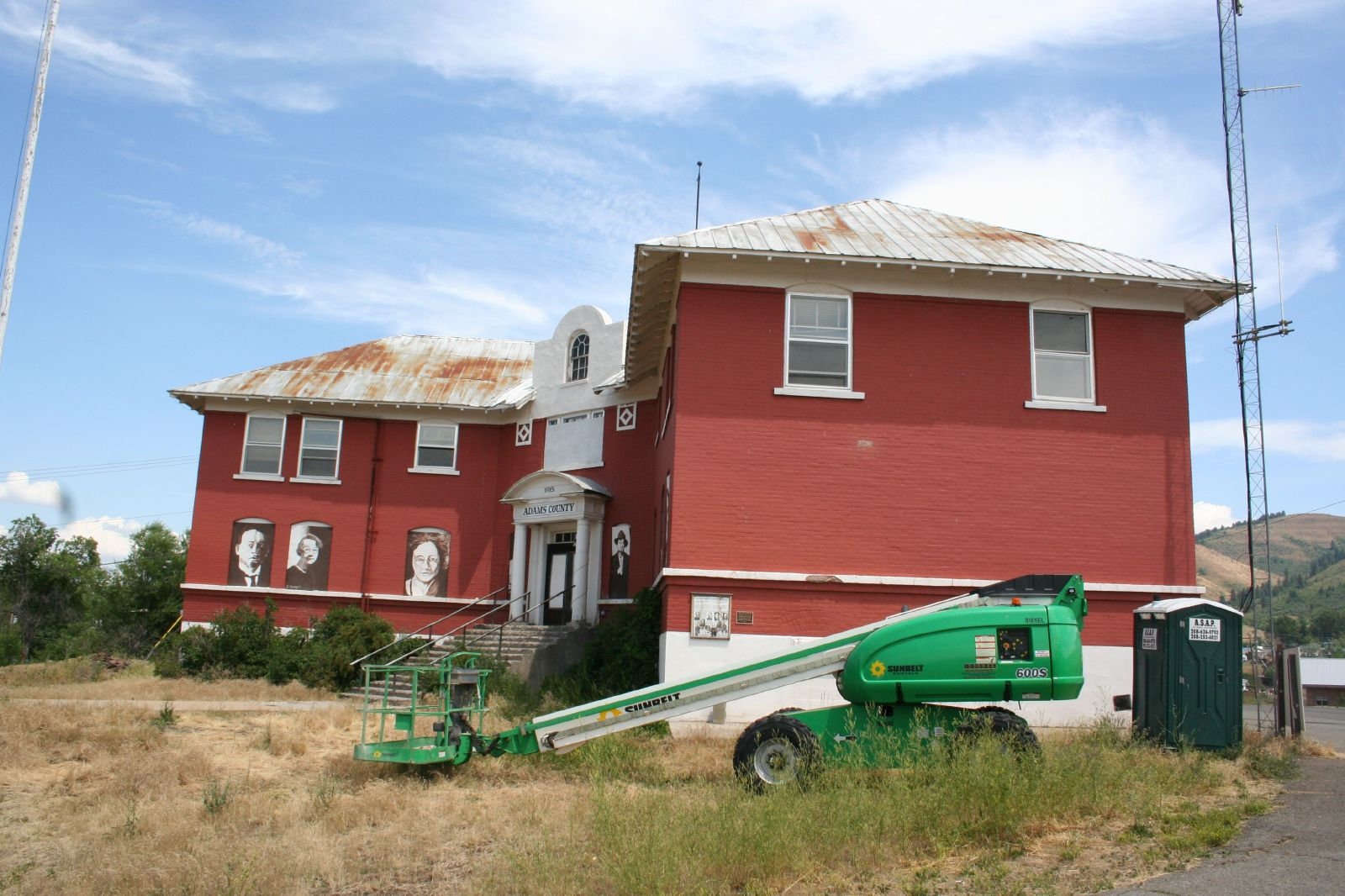

- Location within Idaho Location within the United States
- Location: Michigan St., Council, Idaho
- Coordinates: 44°43′47″N 116°25′52″W
- Area: less than one acre
- Built: 1915
- Architectural style: Colonial Revival
- MPS: County Courthouses in Idaho MPS
- NRHP reference No.: 87001599
- Added to NRHP: September 22, 1987

The Adams County Courthouse was a building located in Council, Idaho which was built in 1915. It was listed on the National Register of Historic Places in 1987.

It was a two-and-a-half-story building on a raised basement, located on a hill rising above Council's downtown, and appeared monumental despite its small size. It had an L-shaped plan with the front entrance in the inside corner of the L.

The courthouse was demolished in November 2017.

== See also ==
- List of National Historic Landmarks in Idaho
- National Register of Historic Places listings in Adams County, Idaho
