= Rock Flat Placer =

Mine in Idaho, United States

- Location within Idaho
- Location: McCall, Adams County, Idaho, United States; 44°57′22″N 116°10′15″W
- Products: Gold, Corundum

The Rock Flat Placer is a small placer deposit in central Idaho which is part of the Meadows Mining District. It is known to produce gold, corundum, garnet, zircon, monazite, chromite, ilmenite, magnetite, platinum, topaz, and spinel. Additionally, it is known to produce the occasional diamond, but the last one found was in the 1920s.

- Meadows Mining District
- Rock Flat Mine
- Little Goose Creek Canyon
