= Mesa, Idaho =

Unincorporated community in the state of Idaho, United States

- Unincorporated community
- Location within Idaho Location within the United States
- Coordinates: 44°37′44″N 116°27′03″W
- Country: United States
- State: Idaho
- County: Adams
- Elevation: 3,251 ft (991 m)
- Time zone: UTC-7 (Mountain (MST))
  - Summer (DST): UTC-6 (MDT)
- ZIP code: 83643
- Area codes: 208, 986
- GNIS feature ID: 396882

Mesa is an unincorporated community in Adams County, Idaho, United States. Mesa is located near U.S. Route 95 7 miles (11 km) south of Council. Mesa has its own ZIP code, 83643. It is home to the Marymount Hermitage.

== History ==
Mesa's population was 30 in 1960.

== Orchards ==
In the early 20th century, Mesa was home to the Mesa Orchards Company which was best known for its apple production. To combat the naturally dry area, a seven-mile-long wooden flume was constructed to transport water from the Middle Fork of the Weiser River. The final irrigation system was completed in 1911. In 1920, a tramway was built to convey fruit over three miles north to the railroad. The company changed ownership due to debt in 1936.

After 63 days of below zero temperatures in the winter of 1949, many of the fruit trees produced poorly and were eventually cleared for pasture. Today, the area is home to private residences, range, and pasture.
