= Goodrich, Idaho =

Unincorporated community in the state of Idaho, United States

- Unincorporated community
- Location within Idaho Location within the United States
- Coordinates: 44°39′13″N 116°33′29″W
- Country: United States
- State: Idaho
- County: Adams
- Elevation: 2,772 ft (845 m)
- Time zone: UTC-7 (Mountain (MST))
  - Summer (DST): UTC-6 (MDT)
- Area codes: 208, 986
- GNIS feature ID: 396573

Goodrich is an unincorporated community in Adams County, Idaho, United States.
