= Indian Valley, Idaho =

Unincorporated community in the state of Idaho, United States

- Unincorporated community
- Location within Idaho Location within the United States
- Coordinates: 44°33′26″N 116°26′03″W
- Country: United States
- State: Idaho
- County: Adams
- Elevation: 3,002 ft (915 m)
- Time zone: UTC-7 (Mountain (MST))
  - Summer (DST): UTC-6 (MDT)
- ZIP code: 83632
- Area codes: 208, 986
- GNIS feature ID: 373244

Indian Valley is an unincorporated community in Adams County, Idaho, United States. Indian Valley is 12 miles (19 km) east of Cambridge. Indian Valley has a post office with ZIP code 83632.

== History ==
Indian Valley's population was 90 in 1909, and was 30 in 1960.
