= Little Ski Hill =

Ski area in Idaho, United States

- Location in Idaho Little Ski Hill (the United States)
- Location: Adams County, Idaho, U.S.
- Nearest city: McCall - 2 miles (3 km)
- Coordinates: 44°55′48″N 116°09′47″W
- Vertical: 405 ft (123 m)
- Top elevation: 5,600 ft (1,707 m)
- Base elevation: 5,195 ft (1,583 m)
- Skiable area: 50 acres (20 ha)
- Lift system: 1 T-bar
- Snowmaking: none
- Night skiing: yes
- Website: Little Ski Hill.org

The Little Ski Hill is a modest ski area in the western United States, located in west central Idaho, two miles (3 km) west of McCall. Adjacent to Highway 55, immediately west of the county line in Adams County, it was formerly known as the "Payette Lakes Ski Area."

Built in 1937 as a winter diversion for local forest workers, the Little Ski Hill has served the region's youth and skiing community for over eighty years. The small but action-packed facility has an alpine hill served by a T-bar surface lift, providing 405 vertical feet (123 m) of terrain on the only lighted ski area in the vicinity. It has a summit elevation of 5,600 feet (1,707 m) above sea level; the slopes face north and west.

The ski area also has 18.6 miles (30 km) of groomed cross-country ski trails and a biathlon range.

Ski legend and fifty-year McCall resident Corey Engen taught at the hill for years before developing the nearby Brundage Mountain in 1961.

The area formerly had a 50-60 meter Nordic ski jump on its lower north slope, near the bend in the highway. The aging jump was destroyed by a microburst wind in the 1990s. A 25-30 meter Nordic ski jump is still in use.

Patty Boydstun, a World Cup alpine ski racer, grew up in McCall and learned to ski at the hill. She finished eighth in the slalom at the 1972 Winter Olympics and had ten top-ten finishes in slalom on the World Cup circuit.
