= New Meadows, Idaho =

- City
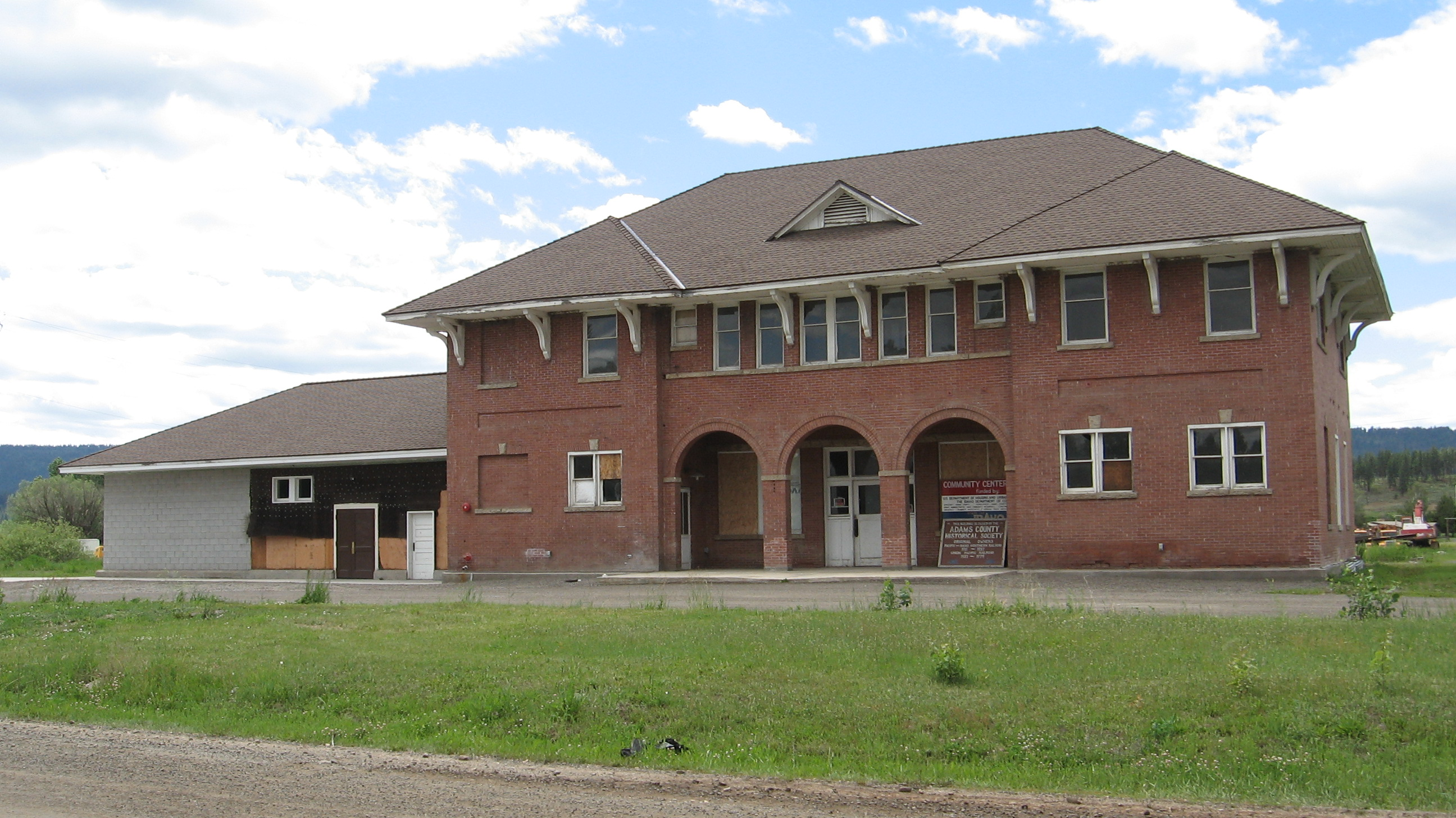
- PIN Railroad Depot in 2007

- Seal

- Location of New Meadows in Adams County, Idaho.
- Coordinates: 44°58′16″N 116°17′09″W
- Country: United States
- State: Idaho
- County: Adams

Area
  - Total: 0.59 sq mi (1.54 km^{2})
  - Land: 0.58 sq mi (1.51 km^{2})
  - Water: 0.012 sq mi (0.03 km^{2})
- Elevation: 3,868 ft (1,179 m)

Population (2020)
  - Total: 517
  - Density: 887/sq mi (342/km^{2})
- Time zone: UTC-7 (Mountain (MST))
  - Summer (DST): UTC-6 (MDT)
- ZIP code: 83654
- Area codes: 208, 986
- FIPS code: 16-56890
- GNIS feature ID: 2411234
- Website: www.newmeadowsidaho.us

New Meadows is a rural city in Adams County, Idaho, United States, at the southern and upper end of the Meadows Valley, on the Little Salmon River. Located in the west central part of the state, just south of the 45th parallel, the population was 517 at the 2020 census, up from 496 in 2010. New Meadows is located at the junction of the primary north–south highway in the state, U.S. Route 95, and State Highway 55, which connects it with McCall and Boise.

== History ==
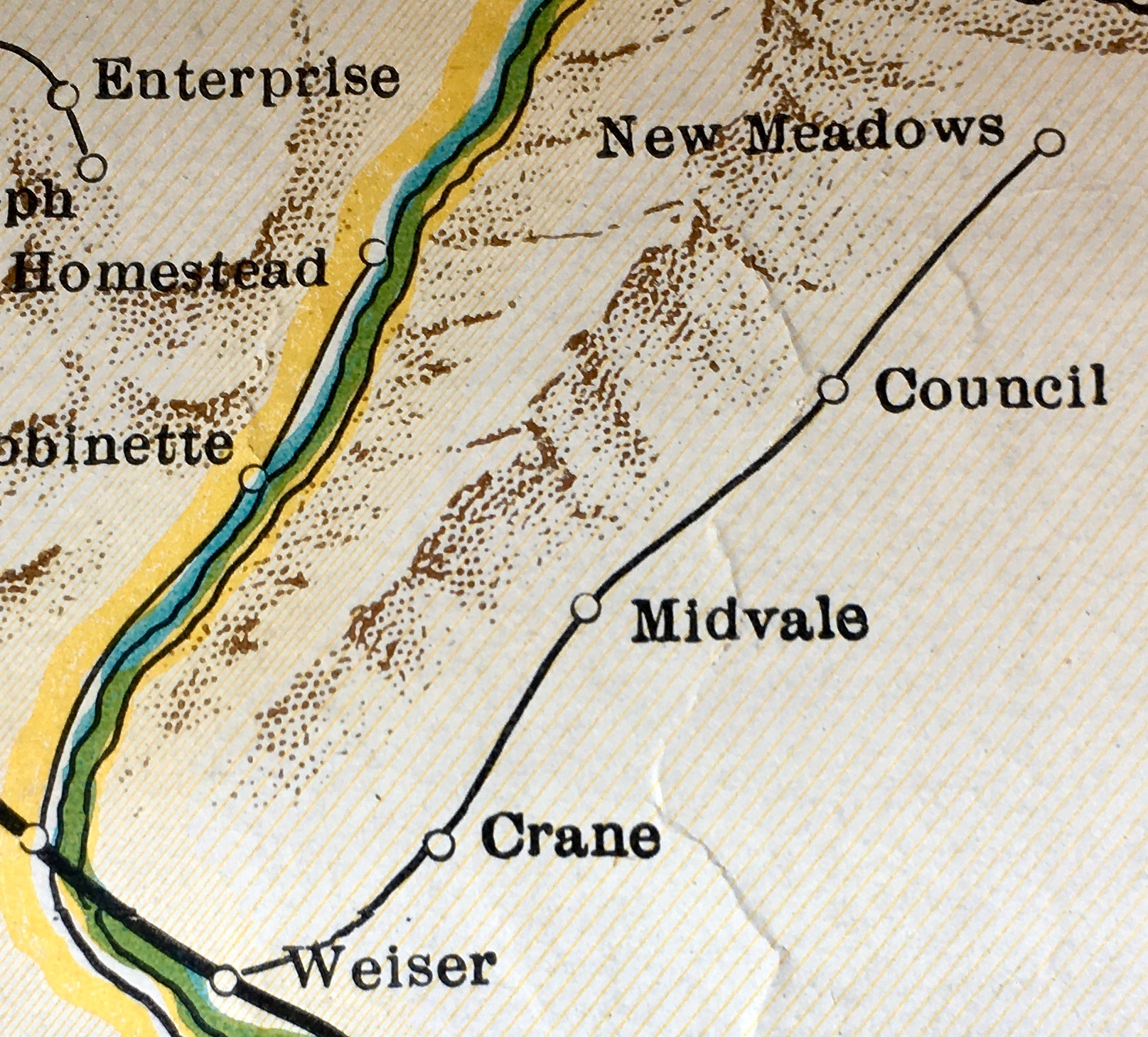
Pacific and Idaho Northern Railroad in 1930

Prior to the establishment of Adams County in 1911, Meadows was in Washington County; The Meadows Eagle newspaper served the community, and C. A. Hackney was the publisher.

The Pacific and Idaho Northern (PIN) Railroad ran from Weiser to an area about two miles (3 km) west of Meadows, the site of modern-day New Meadows founded in 1911. The city of New Meadows hosts the last surviving remnants of the PIN; without the railroad, New Meadows would arguably not have existed.

The depot was built in 1910 and served as the northern end of the PIN Railroad. It is a significant cultural and historical resource in the Payette River Scenic Byway corridor in the city of New Meadows, at the junction of US-95 and state highway 55. It is listed on the National Register of Historic Places. The depot is an asset for the community of New Meadows and currently functions as a community center for the local area. It hosted the Barn Again! Smithsonian Institution traveling exhibition in 2005, and represents early twentieth century efforts to create a north–south railroad for Idaho. Though the efforts ultimately failed, the PIN Railroad served an important function as a "farm-to-market" railroad until 1940, and then as a timber railroad for local timber outfits.

The Union Pacific acquired the line in 1936 and in 1979 abandoned the northern end of the line, from the Tamarack sawmill site north of Council to New Meadows, along US-95. The depot was a functioning facility until 1972. In 1978, ACHS acquired the title to the PIN Depot to preserve it as a repository for the history of Adams County. Since 2000, the building has been preserved from immediate deterioration; the foundation has been restored and the building has a new roof.

== Education ==
The only school in New Meadows is the Meadows Valley School, which houses all thirteen grades, K-12. The school mascot is the mountaineer, and the school colors are orange and black.

== Recreation ==
Two established alpine ski areas, Brundage Mountain and the Little Ski Hill are less than ten miles (16 km) to the east, both on the west side of the Valley/Adams county line. The MeadowCreek golf resort (originally "Kimberland Meadows") is a few miles northwest of town. Payette Lake and the surrounding areas in McCall offer numerous recreational opportunities, and further north along US-95 is Riggins, the gateway to the Salmon River and the Seven Devils Mountains. Five miles (8 km) north of New Meadows is Zim's Hot Springs.

== Highways ==
- - U.S. Route 95
- - State Highway 55 - Payette River Scenic Byway

New Meadows is approximately 115 miles (185 km) north of Boise, accessed via State Highway 55, the Payette River Scenic Byway, a designated national scenic byway. It heads north from Eagle in Ada County to Horseshoe Bend in Boise County, and climbs the whitewater of the Payette River to Cascade and McCall in Valley County. The route turns west at Payette Lake in McCall and ends at New Meadows at the junction with U.S. Route 95.

== Geography ==
According to the United States Census Bureau, the city has a total area of 0.53 square miles (1.37 km^{2}), of which, 0.52 square miles (1.35 km^{2}) is land and 0.01 square miles (0.026 km^{2}) is water.

=== Climate ===
According to the Köppen Climate Classification system, New Meadows has a warm-summer mediterranean continental climate, abbreviated "Dsb" on climate maps. The hottest temperature recorded in New Meadows was 104 °F (40.0 °C) on August 9, 1906, July 19, 1960, and July 13, 2002, while the coldest temperature recorded was −49 °F (−45.0 °C) on December 13, 1919.

Climate data for New Meadows, Idaho, 1991–2020 normals, extremes 1905–2020
Month	Jan	Feb	Mar	Apr	May	Jun	Jul	Aug	Sep	Oct	Nov	Dec	Year
Record high °F (°C)	56 (13)	62 (17)	73 (23)	87 (31)	93 (34)	101 (38)	104 (40)	104 (40)	97 (36)	89 (32)	72 (22)	64 (18)	104 (40)
Mean maximum °F (°C)	42.0 (5.6)	47.5 (8.6)	60.4 (15.8)	72.5 (22.5)	81.3 (27.4)	88.9 (31.6)	95.9 (35.5)	95.4 (35.2)	89.8 (32.1)	77.7 (25.4)	58.5 (14.7)	44.1 (6.7)	96.9 (36.1)
Mean daily maximum °F (°C)	30.0 (−1.1)	36.2 (2.3)	45.1 (7.3)	54.6 (12.6)	63.8 (17.7)	72.2 (22.3)	84.8 (29.3)	84.6 (29.2)	74.7 (23.7)	57.9 (14.4)	41.9 (5.5)	30.7 (−0.7)	56.4 (13.5)
Daily mean °F (°C)	19.7 (−6.8)	24.1 (−4.4)	33.0 (0.6)	40.9 (4.9)	48.6 (9.2)	55.7 (13.2)	64.0 (17.8)	62.7 (17.1)	53.8 (12.1)	42.0 (5.6)	30.6 (−0.8)	21.7 (−5.7)	41.4 (5.2)
Mean daily minimum °F (°C)	9.4 (−12.6)	12.1 (−11.1)	20.8 (−6.2)	27.2 (−2.7)	33.4 (0.8)	39.1 (3.9)	43.3 (6.3)	40.7 (4.8)	32.9 (0.5)	25.2 (−3.8)	19.3 (−7.1)	12.6 (−10.8)	26.3 (−3.2)
Mean minimum °F (°C)	−16.1 (−26.7)	−10.4 (−23.6)	1.8 (−16.8)	16.1 (−8.8)	20.9 (−6.2)	28.3 (−2.1)	33.2 (0.7)	30.5 (−0.8)	21.9 (−5.6)	12.3 (−10.9)	1.0 (−17.2)	−13.1 (−25.1)	−22.2 (−30.1)
Record low °F (°C)	−43 (−42)	−44 (−42)	−29 (−34)	−2 (−19)	12 (−11)	19 (−7)	20 (−7)	18 (−8)	11 (−12)	−7 (−22)	−34 (−37)	−49 (−45)	−49 (−45)
Average precipitation inches (mm)	2.85 (72)	2.00 (51)	2.51 (64)	2.01 (51)	2.35 (60)	2.08 (53)	0.70 (18)	0.56 (14)	1.01 (26)	1.83 (46)	2.55 (65)	4.05 (103)	24.50 (622)
Average snowfall inches (cm)	18.0 (46)	10.5 (27)	3.9 (9.9)	0.9 (2.3)	0.1 (0.25)	0.0 (0.0)	0.0 (0.0)	0.0 (0.0)	0.0 (0.0)	0.2 (0.51)	4.4 (11)	18.6 (47)	56.6 (143.96)
Source 1: NOAA
Source 2: National Weather Service

== Demographics ==
Historical population
Census	Pop.	Note	%±
1920	141		—
1930	220		56.0%
1940	264		20.0%
1950	621		135.2%
1960	647		4.2%
1970	605		−6.5%
1980	576		−4.8%
1990	534		−7.3%
2000	533		−0.2%
2010	496		−6.9%
2020	517		4.2%
U.S. Decennial Census

=== 2010 census ===
As of the census of 2010, there were 496 people, 201 households, and 136 families residing in the city. The population density was 953.8 inhabitants per square mile (368.3/km^{2}). There were 264 housing units at an average density of 507.7 per square mile (196.0/km^{2}). The racial makeup of the city was 95.4% White, 0.4% Native American, 3.2% from other races, and 1.0% from two or more races. Hispanic or Latino of any race were 4.8% of the population.

There were 201 households, of which 34.3% had children under the age of 18 living with them, 51.2% were married couples living together, 10.0% had a female householder with no husband present, 6.5% had a male householder with no wife present, and 32.3% were non-families. 24.9% of all households were made up of individuals, and 7% had someone living alone who was 65 years of age or older. The average household size was 2.46 and the average family size was 2.91.

The median age in the city was 35.9 years. 27.2% of residents were under the age of 18; 8.1% were between the ages of 18 and 24; 25.4% were from 25 to 44; 28.5% were from 45 to 64; and 10.9% were 65 years of age or older. The gender makeup of the city was 51.2% male and 48.8% female.

=== 2000 census ===
As of the census of 2000, there were 533 people, 208 households, and 143 families residing in the city. The population density was 1,089.1 inhabitants per square mile (420.5/km^{2}). There were 262 housing units at an average density of 535.4 per square mile (206.7/km^{2}). The racial makeup of the city was 97.19% White, 0.19% African American, 1.31% Native American, 0.38% from other races, and 0.94% from two or more races. Hispanic or Latino of any race were 0.75% of the population.

There were 208 households, out of which 34.6% had children under the age of 18 living with them, 57.7% were married couples living together, 7.7% had a female householder with no husband present, and 30.8% were non-families. 24.5% of all households were made up of individuals, and 7.2% had someone living alone who was 65 years of age or older. The average household size was 2.56 and the average family size was 3.08.

In the city, the population was spread out, with 29.1% under the age of 18, 6.2% from 18 to 24, 30.8% from 25 to 44, 24.0% from 45 to 64, and 9.9% who were 65 years of age or older. The median age was 36 years. For every 100 females, there were 159.5 males. For every 100 females age 18 and over, there were 140.1 males.

The median income for a household in the city was $28,500, and the median income for a family was $31,042. Males had a median income of $30,000 versus $14,500 for females. The per capita income for the city was $11,884. About 16.2% of families and 16.4% of the population were below the poverty line, including 14.8% of those under age 18 and 5.0% of those age 65 or over.

== Residents ==
- Gilbert F. Smith, state legislator and president of Meadows Valley Bank

== See also ==
- Pacific and Idaho Northern Railroad Depot
- National Register of Historic Places listings in Adams County, Idaho
