= Adams County, Idaho =

County in Idaho, United States

- County
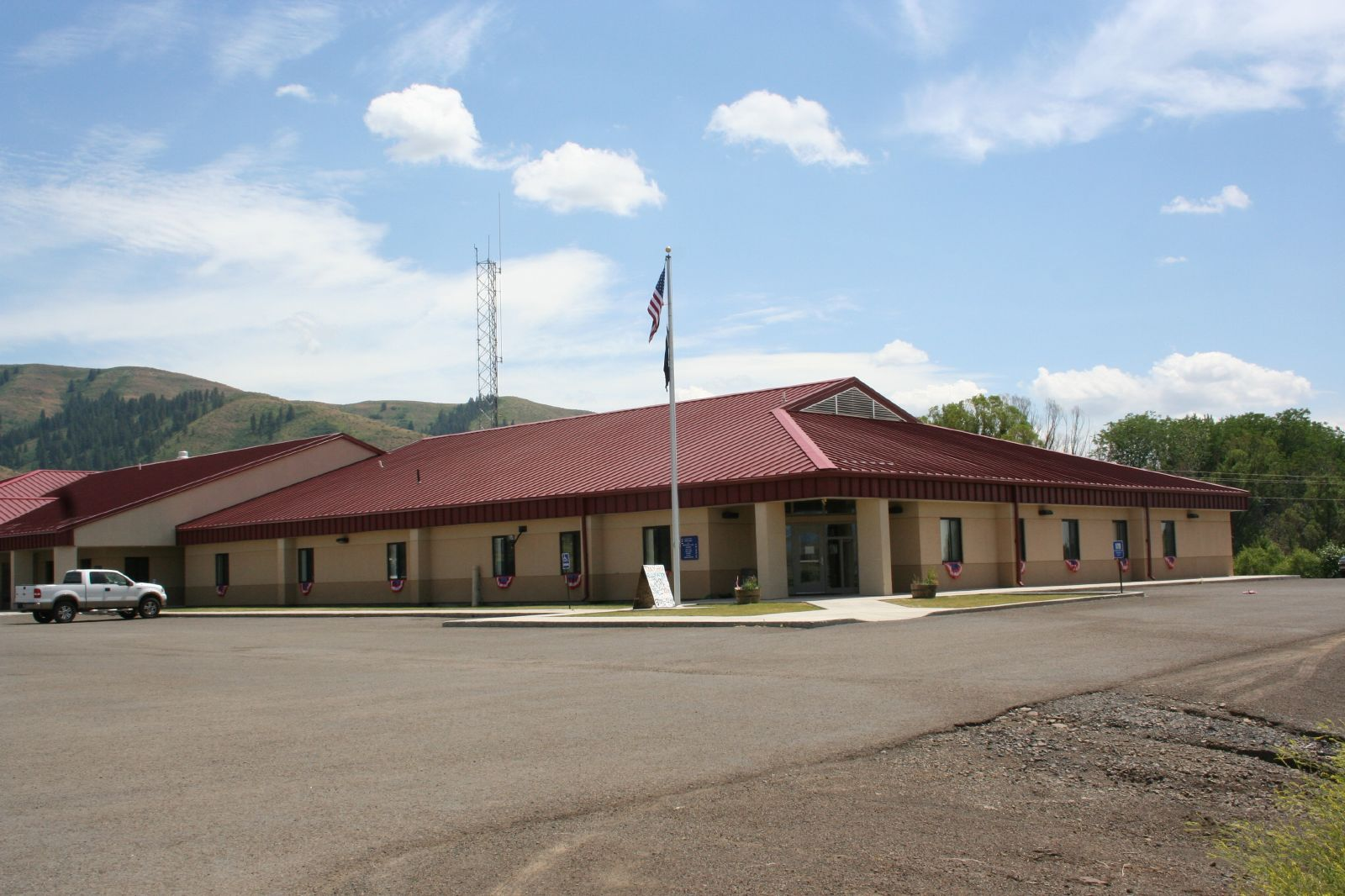
- Adams County Courthouse

- Seal

- Location within the U.S. state of Idaho
- Coordinates: 44°54′N 116°27′W
- Country: United States
- State: Idaho
- Founded: March 3, 1911
- Named for: John Adams
- Seat: Council
- Largest city: Council

Area
  - Total: 1,370 sq mi (3,500 km^{2})
  - Land: 1,363 sq mi (3,530 km^{2})
  - Water: 6.7 sq mi (17 km^{2}) 0.5%

Population (2020)
  - Total: 4,379
  - Estimate (2025): 5,013 ▲
  - Density: 3.213/sq mi (1.240/km^{2})
- Time zone: UTC−7 (Mountain)
  - Summer (DST): UTC−6 (MDT)
- Congressional district: 1st
- Website: www.co.adams.id.us

Adams County is a rural county in the state of Idaho. As of the 2020 census, the county had a population of 4,379, making it the sixth-least populous county in Idaho. The county seat and largest city is Council. Established in 1911, the county was named for second U.S. President John Adams. Adams County is home to the Brundage Mountain ski area, northeast of New Meadows, and the Little Ski Hill, just west of McCall.

== Geography ==
The west boundary line of Adams County abuts the east line of the state of Oregon, across the Snake River.

According to the U.S. Census Bureau, the county has a total area of 1,370 square miles (3,500 km^{2}), of which 1,363 square miles (3,530 km^{2}) is land and 6.7 square miles (17 km^{2}) (0.5%) is water.

=== Adjacent counties ===
- Idaho County - north
- Valley County - east
- Gem County - southeast
- Washington County - south
- Baker County, Oregon - southwest
- Wallowa County, Oregon - northwest

=== Highways ===
- - US 95
- - SH-55 - Payette River Scenic Byway

=== National protected areas ===
- Hells Canyon National Recreation Area (part)
- Payette National Forest (part)

== Demographics ==
Historical population
Census	Pop.	Note	%±
1920	2,966		—
1930	2,867		−3.3%
1940	3,407		18.8%
1950	3,347		−1.8%
1960	2,978		−11.0%
1970	2,877		−3.4%
1980	3,347		16.3%
1990	3,254		−2.8%
2000	3,476		6.8%
2010	3,976		14.4%
2020	4,379		10.1%
2025 (est.)	5,013	▲	14.5%
US Decennial Census; 1790–1960, 1900–1990, 1990–2000, 2010–2020 2020

=== Racial and ethnic composition ===
Adams County, Idaho – Racial and ethnic composition Note: the US Census treats Hispanic/Latino as an ethnic category. This table excludes Latinos from the racial categories and assigns them to a separate category. Hispanics/Latinos may be of any race.
Race / Ethnicity (NH = Non-Hispanic)	Pop 1980	Pop 1990	Pop 2000	Pop 2010	Pop 2020	% 1980	% 1990	% 2000	% 2010	% 2020
White alone (NH)	3,304	3,172	3,318	3,768	3,992	98.72%	97.48%	95.45%	94.77%	91.16%
Black or African American alone (NH)	0	2	2	4	3	0.00%	0.06%	0.06%	0.10%	0.07%
Native American or Alaska Native alone (NH)	12	41	47	36	27	0.36%	1.26%	1.35%	0.91%	0.62%
Asian alone (NH)	1	1	5	16	8	0.03%	0.03%	0.14%	0.40%	0.18%
Native Hawaiian or Pacific Islander alone (NH)	x	x	1	2	0	x	x	0.03%	0.05%	0.00%
Other race alone (NH)	1	0	17	2	18	0.03%	0.00%	0.49%	0.05%	0.41%
Mixed race or Multiracial (NH)	x	x	32	54	179	x	x	0.92%	1.36%	4.09%
Hispanic or Latino (any race)	29	38	54	94	152	0.87%	1.17%	1.55%	2.36%	3.47%
Total	3,347	3,254	3,476	3,976	4,379	100.00%	100.00%	100.00%	100.00%	100.00%

=== 2020 census ===
As of the 2020 census, the county had a population of 4,379. The median age was 54.9 years. 17.4% of residents were under the age of 18 and 30.3% of residents were 65 years of age or older. For every 100 females there were 108.3 males, and for every 100 females age 18 and over there were 109.4 males age 18 and over.

The racial makeup of the county was 92.7% White, 0.1% Black or African American, 0.9% American Indian and Alaska Native, 0.3% Asian, 0.0% Native Hawaiian and Pacific Islander, 1.1% from some other race, and 5.0% from two or more races. Hispanic or Latino residents of any race comprised 3.5% of the population.

0.0% of residents lived in urban areas, while 100.0% lived in rural areas.

There were 1,927 households in the county, of which 20.4% had children under the age of 18 living with them and 16.7% had a female householder with no spouse or partner present. About 27.6% of all households were made up of individuals and 15.0% had someone living alone who was 65 years of age or older.

There were 2,642 housing units, of which 27.1% were vacant. Among occupied housing units, 79.4% were owner-occupied and 20.6% were renter-occupied. The homeowner vacancy rate was 1.6% and the rental vacancy rate was 3.1%.

=== 2010 census ===
As of the 2010 United States census, there were 3,976 people, 1,748 households, and 1,185 families in the county. The population density was 2.9 inhabitants per square mile (1.1/km^{2}). There were 2,636 housing units at an average density of 1.9 per square mile (0.73/km^{2}). The racial makeup of the county was 96.1% white, 1.0% American Indian, 0.4% Asian, 0.1% Pacific islander, 0.1% black or African American, 0.7% from other races, and 1.7% from two or more races. Those of Hispanic or Latino origin made up 2.4% of the population. In terms of ancestry, 26.3% were German, 18.0% were English, 14.6% were Irish, and 4.9% were American.

Of the 1,748 households, 22.3% had children under the age of 18 living with them, 58.6% were married couples living together, 5.8% had a female householder with no husband present, 32.2% were non-families, and 26.8% of all households were made up of individuals. The average household size was 2.26 and the average family size was 2.70. The median age was 50.0 years.

The median income for a household in the county was $36,004 and the median income for a family was $45,590. Males had a median income of $31,050 versus $26,413 for females. The per capita income for the county was $22,730. About 8.8% of families and 12.4% of the population were below the poverty line, including 13.5% of those under age 18 and 13.5% of those age 65 or over.

=== 2000 census ===
As of the 2000 United States census, there were 3,476 people, 1,421 households, and 1,031 families in the county. The population density was 2.5 people per square mile (0.97 people/km^{2}). There were 1,982 housing units at an average density of 2 per square mile (0.77/km^{2}). The racial makeup of the county was 96.29% White, 1.41% Native American, 0.14% Asian, 0.06% Black or African American, 0.03% Pacific Islander, 0.92% from other races, and 1.15% from two or more races. 1.55% of the population were Hispanic or Latino of any race. 25.6% were of American, 17.9% German, 11.8% English and 7.0% Irish ancestry.

There were 1,421 households, out of which 28.00% had children under the age of 18 living with them, 63.30% were married couples living together, 5.70% had a female householder with no husband present, and 27.40% were non-families. 23.20% of all households were made up of individuals, and 9.90% had someone living alone who was 65 years of age or older. The average household size was 2.42 and the average family size was 2.83.

The county population contained 23.90% under the age of 18, 4.60% from 18 to 24, 22.60% from 25 to 44, 32.70% from 45 to 64, and 16.10% who were 65 years of age or older. The median age was 44 years. For every 100 females, there were 105.40 males. For every 100 females age 18 and over, there were 102.10 males.

The median income for a household in the county was $28,423, and the median income for a family was $32,335. Males had a median income of $29,097 versus $14,408 for females. The per capita income for the county was $14,908. About 11.70% of families and 15.10% of the population were below the poverty line, including 16.90% of those under age 18 and 11.70% of those age 65 or over.

== Communities ==
=== Cities ===
- Council
- New Meadows

=== Unincorporated communities ===
- Alpine
- Bear
- Beer Bottle Crossing
- Cuprum
- Devils Ladder
- Fruitvale
- Glendale
- Goodrich
- Helena
- Indian Valley
- Meadows
- Mesa
- Pine Ridge
- Starkey
- Tamarack
- Wildhorse
- Woodland

=== Population ranking ===
The population ranking of the following table is based on the 2010 census of Adams County.

† county seat

Rank	City/Town/etc.	Municipal type	Population (2010 Census)
1	† Council	City	839
2	New Meadows	City	438

== Politics ==
United States presidential election results for Adams County, Idaho
Year	Republican		Democratic		Third party(ies)	
Year	No.	%	No.	%	No.	%
1912	598	39.81%	417	27.76%	487	32.42%
1916	667	46.19%	645	44.67%	132	9.14%
1920	682	63.62%	390	36.38%	0	0.00%
1924	422	42.24%	208	20.82%	369	36.94%
1928	521	57.57%	374	41.33%	10	1.10%
1932	325	26.02%	854	68.37%	70	5.60%
1936	434	33.49%	770	59.41%	92	7.10%
1940	779	45.53%	929	54.30%	3	0.18%
1944	642	47.07%	721	52.86%	1	0.07%
1948	603	47.33%	647	50.78%	24	1.88%
1952	933	64.26%	517	35.61%	2	0.14%
1956	842	60.84%	542	39.16%	0	0.00%
1960	799	52.46%	724	47.54%	0	0.00%
1964	689	47.88%	750	52.12%	0	0.00%
1968	844	58.98%	360	25.16%	227	15.86%
1972	963	67.77%	293	20.62%	165	11.61%
1976	809	54.74%	639	43.23%	30	2.03%
1980	1,189	62.68%	590	31.10%	118	6.22%
1984	1,381	70.60%	540	27.61%	35	1.79%
1988	1,107	61.53%	643	35.74%	49	2.72%
1992	754	38.93%	457	23.59%	726	37.48%
1996	1,053	54.03%	537	27.55%	359	18.42%
2000	1,476	77.32%	336	17.60%	97	5.08%
2004	1,468	71.16%	555	26.90%	40	1.94%
2008	1,517	65.39%	728	31.38%	75	3.23%
2012	1,413	68.56%	577	28.00%	71	3.44%
2016	1,556	71.28%	415	19.01%	212	9.71%
2020	1,941	75.06%	591	22.85%	54	2.09%
2024	2,037	75.98%	577	21.52%	67	2.50%

== Education ==
School districts include:

- Cambridge Joint School District 432
- Council School District 13
- McCall-Donnelly Joint School District 421
- Meadows Valley School District 11
- Salmon River School District 243

Residents are in the area (but not the taxation zone) for College of Western Idaho.

== Healthcare ==
The county is served by the Southwest Idaho Health District.

== See also ==
- National Register of Historic Places listings in Adams County, Idaho
- Rock Flat Placer
- Rock Flat Mine
