= Council, Idaho =

- City
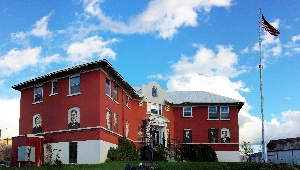
- The old Adams County courthouse in Council, Idaho

- Location of Council in Adams County, Idaho.

- Location in the United States
- Coordinates: 44°44′45″N 116°26′32″W
- Country: United States
- State: Idaho
- County: Adams

Government
  - Type: City council
  - Mayor: Bruce Gardner

Area
  - Total: 1.08 sq mi (2.80 km^{2})
  - Land: 1.05 sq mi (2.73 km^{2})
  - Water: 0.027 sq mi (0.07 km^{2})
- Elevation: 2,933 ft (894 m)

Population (2020)
  - Total: 867
  - Density: 847.5/sq mi (327.24/km^{2})
- Time zone: UTC-7 (Mountain (MST))
  - Summer (DST): UTC-6 (MDT)
- ZIP code: 83612
- Area codes: 208, 986
- FIPS code: 16-18820
- GNIS feature ID: 2410248
- Website: www.cityofcouncilidaho.org

Council is a city in and the county seat of Adams County, Idaho, United States. The population was 867 at the 2020 census.

== Major events ==
Racers and their porcupine competing in the 2017 World Championship Porcupine Race

=== Porcupine Races ===
Council holds a "World Champion Porcupine Race" on July 4th (Independence Day (United States)). The racers are (mostly) local youth who capture wild porcupines, race them and then return them back to where they were captured.

=== Council Mountain Music Festival ===
Started in 2001, the Council Mountain Music Festival is held the third weekend in August at the Veterans Memorial Peace Park on HWY 95, just north of Council. The festival features Irish music, rock music, blues, bluegrass music, country music, and folk music. The weekend includes an open jam session, scramble bands (all willing musicians put their names into a hat, and names are drawn to form “on the spot” bands who rehearse and perform three songs), food vendors, Lion’s Club breakfast, a community church service in the park on Sunday, and a community pig roast Sunday afternoon.

== Geography and climate ==
According to the United States Census Bureau, the city has a total area of 1.03 square miles (2.67 km^{2}), of which, 1 square mile (2.59 km^{2}) is land and 0.03 square miles (0.08 km^{2}) is water.

Council experiences the typical continental Mediterranean climate (Köppen Dsa) of northern Idaho, with cold, snowy winters and hot, dry summers. It differs from cities like Moscow and Bonners Ferry in having substantially hotter summers, with average maxima as much as 7 °F or 4 °C higher and absolute maxima among the highest in the northwestern United States. The average annual precipitation for Council is 24 inches, and the average annual snowfall is around 47 inches.

Climate data for Council, Idaho, 1991–2020 normals, extremes 1911–present
Month	Jan	Feb	Mar	Apr	May	Jun	Jul	Aug	Sep	Oct	Nov	Dec	Year
Record high °F (°C)	59 (15)	62 (17)	77 (25)	90 (32)	98 (37)	105 (41)	110 (43)	109 (43)	102 (39)	91 (33)	73 (23)	61 (16)	110 (43)
Mean maximum °F (°C)	44.6 (7.0)	51.4 (10.8)	64.7 (18.2)	75.5 (24.2)	87.0 (30.6)	93.7 (34.3)	102.3 (39.1)	101.0 (38.3)	93.5 (34.2)	80.7 (27.1)	60.8 (16.0)	47.9 (8.8)	103.2 (39.6)
Mean daily maximum °F (°C)	33.4 (0.8)	39.8 (4.3)	51.7 (10.9)	61.3 (16.3)	71.8 (22.1)	79.9 (26.6)	91.9 (33.3)	91.0 (32.8)	80.1 (26.7)	64.3 (17.9)	47.0 (8.3)	35.9 (2.2)	62.3 (16.8)
Daily mean °F (°C)	25.7 (−3.5)	30.7 (−0.7)	40.5 (4.7)	47.9 (8.8)	57.1 (13.9)	64.4 (18.0)	74.6 (23.7)	73.0 (22.8)	62.8 (17.1)	49.6 (9.8)	36.7 (2.6)	27.7 (−2.4)	49.2 (9.6)
Mean daily minimum °F (°C)	18.0 (−7.8)	21.6 (−5.8)	29.2 (−1.6)	34.6 (1.4)	42.3 (5.7)	48.8 (9.3)	57.3 (14.1)	55.0 (12.8)	45.4 (7.4)	34.9 (1.6)	26.3 (−3.2)	19.4 (−7.0)	36.1 (2.2)
Mean minimum °F (°C)	−2.7 (−19.3)	4.0 (−15.6)	14.8 (−9.6)	23.1 (−4.9)	28.8 (−1.8)	35.2 (1.8)	45.2 (7.3)	42.3 (5.7)	32.8 (0.4)	21.5 (−5.8)	9.8 (−12.3)	0.6 (−17.4)	−6.4 (−21.3)
Record low °F (°C)	−26 (−32)	−27 (−33)	−12 (−24)	8 (−13)	20 (−7)	29 (−2)	29 (−2)	33 (1)	20 (−7)	8 (−13)	−20 (−29)	−25 (−32)	−27 (−33)
Average precipitation inches (mm)	2.67 (68)	2.02 (51)	2.61 (66)	2.12 (54)	2.37 (60)	1.59 (40)	0.44 (11)	0.44 (11)	0.95 (24)	1.61 (41)	2.61 (66)	2.98 (76)	22.40 (569)
Source 1: NOAA
Source 2: National Weather Service

== Demographics ==
Historical population
Census	Pop.	Note	%±
1910	312		—
1920	388		24.4%
1930	355		−8.5%
1940	692		94.9%
1950	748		8.1%
1960	827		10.6%
1970	899		8.7%
1980	917		2.0%
1990	831		−9.4%
2000	816		−1.8%
2010	839		2.8%
2020	867		3.3%
U.S. Decennial Census

=== 2010 census ===
As of the census of 2010, there were 839 people, 360 households, and 224 families residing in the city. The population density was 839.0 inhabitants per square mile (323.9/km^{2}). There were 476 housing units at an average density of 476.0 per square mile (183.8/km^{2}). The racial makeup of the city was 96.5% White, 0.1% African American, 0.7% Native American, 0.2% Asian, 0.1% Pacific Islander, 0.2% from other races, and 2.0% from two or more races. Hispanic or Latino of any race were 3.0% of the population.

There were 360 households, of which 25.0% had children under the age of 18 living with them, 49.4% were married couples living together, 9.7% had a female householder with no husband present, 3.1% had a male householder with no wife present, and 37.8% were non-families. 33.9% of all households were made up of individuals, and 15.6% had someone living alone who was 65 years of age or older. The average household size was 2.28 and the average family size was 2.87.

The median age in the city was 44.4 years. 21.1% of residents were under the age of 18; 8.7% were between the ages of 18 and 24; 21.1% were from 25 to 44; 28.9% were from 45 to 64; and 20.3% were 65 years of age or older. The gender makeup of the city was 48.7% male and 51.3% female.

=== 2000 census ===
As of the census of 2000, there were 816 people, 339 households, and 223 families residing in the city. The population density was 1,121.5 inhabitants per square mile (433.0/km^{2}). There were 425 housing units at an average density of 584.1 per square mile (225.5/km^{2}). The racial makeup of the city was 96.57% White, 1.72% Native American, 0.12% Asian, 0.12% Pacific Islander, 0.12% from other races, and 1.35% from two or more races. Hispanic or Latino of any race were 1.59% of the population.

There were 339 households, out of which 27.4% had children under the age of 18 living with them, 55.5% were married couples living together, 7.7% had a female householder with no husband present, and 34.2% were non-families. 30.1% of all households were made up of individuals, and 14.5% had someone living alone who was 65 years of age or older. The average household size was 2.29 and the average family size was 2.87.

In the city, the population was spread out, with 23.5% under the age of 18, 5.1% from 18 to 24, 24.8% from 25 to 44, 27.9% from 45 to 64, and 18.6% who were 65 years of age or older. The median age was 43 years. For every 100 females, there were 103.5 males. For every 100 females age 18 and over, there were 103.3 males.

The median income for a household in the city was $24,375, and the median income for a family was $30,000. Males had a median income of $26,667 versus $11,691 for females. The per capita income for the city was $15,170. About 11.7% of families and 15.2% of the population were below the poverty line, including 16.1% of those under age 18 and 19.0% of those age 65 or over.

== Notable people ==
- Larry Craig, former Idaho Senator, was born here
- Harriet Miller, politician, former mayor of Santa Barbara, California; born in Council, Idaho
- Matt Paradis, NFL player, Carolina Panthers
- James Rainwater, physicist, Nobel laureate

== Mayor ==
- Gabe Wilson, as of January 2026.

== Transportation ==
The city is served by U.S. Route 95, connecting it to New Meadows to the north and Cambridge and Weiser to the south. The city is also served by a local small-craft airport owned by the city, and the Weiser River Trail, an 84 mile long Rail Trail, that runs from Weiser, Idaho, through town, to its end, near the town of New Meadows, Idaho.
